= Transgender rights in the United States =

Transgender rights in the United States vary considerably by jurisdiction. In recent decades, there was an expansion of federal, state, and local laws and rulings to protect transgender Americans.

Most states allow change of sex on birth certificates and driver's licenses, although some require proof of gender-affirming surgery or prohibit updating these fields altogether. Some states legally recognize non-binary citizens, and offer an "X" marker on identification documents. Gender self-identification (including an "X" option) was permitted for passports between 2022 and 2025, but was subsequently repealed. Laws concerning name changes in U.S. jurisdictions are also a complex mix of federal and state rules. The Supreme Court's decision in Obergefell v. Hodges established that equal protection requires all jurisdictions to recognize same-sex marriages, giving transgender people the right to marry regardless of whether their partners are legally considered to be same-sex or opposite-sex. The Matthew Shepard and James Byrd Jr. Hate Crimes Prevention Act, of 2009, added crimes motivated by a victim's actual or perceived gender, sexual orientation, gender identity, or disability to the federal definition of a hate crime. However, only some states and territories include gender identity in their hate crime laws.

Since at least 2022, there has been a national movement by conservative and right-wing politicians and organizations against transgender rights. Many red state governments have restricted or eliminated transgender residents' access to gendered public accommodations, gender-related medical care, and identification documents that reflect their gender identity. Bans or restrictions on drag performances as well as those on queer-related literature and academic curricula (e.g. gender and sexuality studies) in public schools have also been instituted by several state governments.

Since Donald Trump's reelection in 2025, he has signed executive orders to prohibit federal recognition of genders beyond male or female assigned at birth, gender-related medical care for people under 19, military service by openly trans people, support of social transition and instruction on gender-related topics in schools, and the inclusion of trans women in women's sports. Two judges had temporarily blocked the under-19 gender-affirming care ban, but, on June 18, 2025, the Supreme Court ruled in United States v. Skrmetti that bans on gender-affirming care for minors were constitutional. Other aspects of these orders have faced legal challenges.

== Family law ==
=== Marriage ===
In Obergefell v. Hodges, the Court ruled that people have a right to marry without regard to sex. Prior to this ruling, the right of transgender people to marry was often subject to legal challenge—as was the status of their marriages after transitioning, particularly in cases where an individual's birth sex was interpreted to mean a same-sex marriage had taken place.

==== Cases ====
In 1959, Christine Jorgensen was denied a marriage license by a clerk in New York City, on the basis that her birth certificate listed her as male; Jorgensen did not pursue the matter in court. Later that year, Charlotte McLeod, who had undergone gender-affirming surgery in Denmark, married her husband Ralph H. Heidel in Miami. She did not mention her birth sex or legal gender to the state, since Florida's marriage law did not require a birth certificate for the issuance of a marriage license to an individual over the age of 21. In 1976, the New Jersey case M.T. v. J.T. held that trans people who had undergone gender-affirming surgery could marry as the legal sex matching their gender identity, the first ruling of its kind.

In Littleton v. Prange (1999), Christie Lee Littleton, a trans woman who had undergone gender-affirming surgery, argued to the Texas 4th Court of Appeals that she was entitled to her deceased husband's estate. The court decided that her marriage certificate was invalid on the basis that her sex should be considered equal to her chromosomes, which were XY (male). As a result, she could not claim her husband's estate. The court subsequently also invalidated her revision to her birth certificate. She appealed to the Supreme Court but it denied certiorari in 2000.

The Kansas Appellate Court ruling in In re Estate of Gardiner (2001) considered and rejected Littleton, preferring M.T. v. J.T. instead. In this case, the Kansas Appellate Court concluded that "[A] trial court must consider and decide whether an individual was male or female at the time the individual's marriage license was issued and the individual was married, not simply what the individual's chromosomes were or were not at the moment of birth. The court may use chromosome makeup as one factor, but not the exclusive factor, in arriving at a decision. Aside from chromosomes, we adopt the criteria set forth by Professor Greenberg. On remand, the trial court is directed to consider factors in addition to chromosome makeup, including: gonadal sex, internal morphologic sex, external morphologic sex, hormonal sex, phenotypic sex, assigned sex and gender of rearing, and sexual identity." In 2002, the Kansas Supreme Court reversed the Appellate court decision in part, following Littleton.

The custody case of Michael Kantaras made national news. Kantaras filed for divorce from Linda Forsythe in 1998, requesting primary custody of their children. Though he won that case in 2002, it was reversed on appeal in 2004 by the Florida Second District Court of Appeal, which upheld Forsythe's claim that the marriage was invalid because Kantaras, a trans man, should be considered a woman and same-sex marriages were illegal in Florida. Review was denied by the Florida Supreme Court.

In re Jose Mauricio LOVO-Lara (2005), the Board of Immigration Appeals ruled that for purposes of an immigration visa, a marriage between a "postoperative transsexual" and a person of the opposite sex is considered legitimate provided the state in which the marriage occurred considers it to be a legitimate heterosexual marriage."

In Fields v. Smith (2011), three transgender women in the Wisconsin prison system filed a lawsuit against Wisconsin for passing a law banning hormone treatment or gender-affirming surgery for inmates. The U.S. District Court for the Eastern District of Wisconsin ruled in favor of the inmates. The U.S. Court of Appeals for the Seventh Circuit affirmed and held that the Wisconsin law violated the Eighth Amendment. The U.S. Supreme Court declined to hear Wisconsin's appeal.

=== Custody ===
Courts are generally allowed to base custody or visitation rulings only on factors that directly affect the best interests of the child. According to this principle, if a transgender parent's gender identity cannot be shown to hurt the child, contact should not be limited, and other custody and visitation orders should not be changed for this reason. Many courts have upheld this principle and have treated transgender custody cases like any other child custody determination—by focusing on standard factors such as parental skills. In Mayfield v. Mayfield, for instance, the court upheld a transgender parent's shared parenting plan because there was no evidence in the record that the parent would not be a "fit, loving and capable parent".

Other times, courts claiming to consider a child's interests have ruled against the transgender parent, leading to the parent losing access to their children on the basis of their gender identity. For example, in 1982 in Ohio, in Cisek v. Cisek, the court terminated a transgender parent's visitation rights. The court asked whether the parent's gender transition was "simply an indulgence of some fantasy". It held that there was a risk of both mental and "social harm" to the children, who might be emotionally confused upon seeing "their father as a woman".

== Reproductive rights ==
Many U.S. jurisdictions require gender-affirming surgery before the person's legal gender can be changed. Ann Torkvist, writing for Salon, criticized this as forced sterilization. Some trans people wish to retain their ability to procreate. Others do not require surgical intervention to treat their gender dysphoria. In these cases, surgery is medically unnecessary and transgender activists have therefore contended that requiring such treatment before a person's gender transition can be recognised is unethical.

Some transgender people use assisted reproduction technology services and preservation of reproductive tissue prior to having surgery that would render them infertile. Depending on what type of gametes the person's body naturally produces, this would include cryopreservation of semen in a sperm bank or preservation of oocytes or ovum. For such individuals, access to surrogacy and in vitro fertilization services is necessary to have children. Some people advocate specifically for transgender people to have a legal right to these services.

== Identity documents ==
Lack of access to identity documents that show their current gender and name can create difficulty for transgender people whose appearance does not match the name, photo and gender on the ID. As of 2024, most states and the federal government no longer require transgender people to have undergone gender-affirming surgery in order to permit name and gender marker changes on driver's licenses, passports and other IDs. However, in 2025 the Trump administration issued an executive order requiring new passports to only be issued with a person's assigned sex at birth.

Having documents which do not match a person's gender presentation has been reported to lead to harassment and discrimination, and can also make it difficult to vote (see the section on Disenfranchisement below).

=== Federal identification documents ===
==== Passports ====
The State Department determines what identifying biographical information is placed on passports. They currently do not allow gender markers that do not match the gender assigned at birth. Passports issued prior to January 2025 remain valid, regardless of whether the gender marker matches.

On June 30, 2021, the government announced that the State Department would begin offering an "X" gender marker and would also allow changing one's gender marker without proving any physical changes to one's sex. Previously, the policy had been amended on June 10, 2010 to allow permanent gender marker changes only if accompanied by a physician's statement that "the applicant has had appropriate clinical treatment for gender transition to the new gender." Before 2010, the required statement was more specific; it was required to be from a surgeon who said that gender reassignment surgery had been completed.

From April 11, 2022, any individual who is a valid US passport holder could legally have F, M or X options listed as a sex/gender marker available and recognized by way of self determination. Starting in late 2023, X was also available for passport cards, emergency passports made by consulates and embassies, consular reports of birth abroad.

Upon his inauguration on January 20, 2025, Donald Trump issued an executive order titled Defending Women from Gender Ideology Extremism and Restoring Biological Truth to the Federal Government which directed the US federal government to replace all uses of gender, including passports, with a new legal category of biological sex from the time of conception, and to only recognize two biological sexes based on size of gametes produced. On January 23, 2025, secretary of state Marco Rubio instructed staff to suspend all applications for passports that requested an "X" sex marker or a change to the existing sex marker. In February 2025, the State Department issued new guidance stating that already-issued passports with an "X" or amended sex marker would remain valid until expired or replaced.

In-progress passport applications, and applications received as of February 7, 2025, would be limited to male or female designations, as determined by "biological sex from the time of conception" as determined by the aforementioned executive order.

==== Federal ID for persons not born in the United States ====
Persons not born in the United States and who hold status in the United States can change the gender marker on their USCIS-issued Certificate of Naturalization, Certificate of Citizenship, Permanent Resident Card, and their State Department-issued Consular Report of Birth Abroad; these serve as foundational identity documents that may be substituted for birth certificates.

Other options include obtaining a state court order affirming the change of legal gender as a linking document, such as California's Order Recognizing Change of Gender.

==== Third gender option at the federal level ====
The United States does not currently recognize non-binary gender at a national level. Some states offer legal documentation of a third gender on birth certificates, driver's licenses, and/or state ID. Previously issued passports using the gender marker "X" remain valid until their expiration date.

From 2021 to 2025, the U.S. federal government recognized a third gender option on passports or other national identity documents, joining other countries including Australia, New Zealand, India, Nepal, Pakistan, Bangladesh, Germany, Malta, and Canada with similar recognition. Third genders have traditionally been acknowledged in a number of Native American cultures as "two spirit" people, in traditional Hawaiian culture as the māhū, and as the fa'afafine in American Samoa. Similarly, immigrants from traditional cultures that acknowledge a third gender would benefit from such a reform, including the muxe gender in southern Mexico and the hijra of south Asian cultures.

The State Department issued the first passport with an "X" gender marker on October 27, 2021. In January 2025, Donald Trump signed Executive Order 14168 to revoke the recognition of a third gender, and on January 22, 2025, Secretary of State Marco Rubio directed the Department of State to suspend all applications seeking a sex marker change or a nonbinary "X" sex marker.

=== ID in the states, the District of Columbia, and territorial documents ===
==== US jurisdictions recognizing a third gender ====
Jurisdictions that legally recognize a non-binary gender on state documents as of January 2025 Recognition via statute or policy Recognition via court order only, isolated instances No legal recognition

2017 was the first year states began allowing people to choose a non-binary "X" gender marker on state IDs and driver's licenses, although individuals had obtained non-binary gender designations on state IDs earlier (including a "hermaphrodite" marker in Ohio in 2012, followed in 2016 by non-binary markers for Elisa Rae Shupe in Oregon and for Sara Kelly Keenan in California.

The first state to announce that they would allow gender-neutral ID was Oregon, in June 2017, but Washington, D.C. announced the same intent a week later, and their law went into effect on June 27, a few days before Oregon's, making Washington D.C. the first place in the U.S. to offer gender-neutral driver's licenses and ID cards. Other states began offering a third gender marker in 2018, including Maine, New Jersey, Minnesota, Colorado, and Massachusetts. New York City and California followed in January 2019. Connecticut, Delaware, Hawai'i, IIlinois, Maine, Maryland, Michigan, Nevada, New Hampshire, New Jersey, New York, Ohio, Oregon, Puerto Rico, Pennsylvania, Rhode Island, Utah, Virginia, and Vermont also introduced gender neutral markers.

The Movement Advancement Project maintains a map of the United States showing which states offer non-binary gender options.

==== Birth certificates ====
Map detailing requirements for altering gender markers on birth certificates in the US Source: Identity Document Laws and Policies State allows residents to mark M, F, or X on their birth certificates (16 states, 1 territory + D.C.) State bans the use of an X option on birth certificates (3 states) State updates birth certificates using an administrative process and does not require provider documentation (14 states) State updates birth certificates using an administrative process and requires provider documentation of "appropriate treatment" (12 states, 2 territories + D.C.) State has unclear process and/or unclear medical requirements left to the discretion of individual judges (see citations for more information) (6 states, 2 territories) State updates birth certificates using an administrative process but requires proof of surgery (2 states) State updates birth certificates but requires both a court order and proof of surgery (8 states, 1 territory) State does not allow for amending the gender marker on the birth certificate (8 states)

U.S. states make their own laws about birth certificates, and state courts have issued varied rulings about transgender people. Most states permit the name and sex to be changed on a birth certificate, either by amending the existing birth certificate or by issuing a new one, although some require medical proof of gender-affirming surgery to do so.

These include:

- Texas, by opinion of the local clerk's office, will make a court-ordered change of sex.
- New York State and New York City both passed legislation in 2014 to ease the process for changing sex on the birth certificate, eliminating the requirement for proof of surgery.
- Nevada eliminated the surgery requirement in November 2016. It requires an affidavit from the person making the change and an affidavit who can attest that the information is accurate.
- Colorado (February 2019) and New Mexico (November 2019) eliminated the surgery requirement and made the gender marker "X" available.
- Virginia removed the requirement for surgery to change the gender marker in September 2020.
- Kansas began allowing changes to the gender marker in June 2019. The person must sign an affidavit. If they do not already have documentation (driver's license or passport) with their preferred gender marker, they must bring a letter from a doctor or psychotherapist affirming their gender, but they do not need proof of surgery. These documents were invalidated in February 2026 with Kansas Senate Bill 244 going into effect.

Regulations were set up under a signed executive order for the Kansas Department of Health and Environment (KDHE) by the Governor of Kansas. In 2023, SB 180 was passed by the Kansas Legislature, which changed the laws regarding changing a person's gender markers on their birth certificate and state identity documents. The KDHE announced it would no longer issue new birth certificates with amended gender markers due to recently passed state law, and any previously issued birth certificates with a changed gender marker would be reverted to the original gender at birth if reissued.

Additionally, the Kansas Department of Revenue (KDOR) announced after a temporary restraining order that any credentials issued after July 10, 2023 would be required to reflect the gender of the person at birth, if known to the department.

Tennessee will not change the sex on a birth certificate under any circumstances.

In December 2020, a federal judge invalidated an unconstitutional departmental rule banning sex changes on an individual's birth certificate within Ohio.

In 2022, Oklahoma became the second state to ban legal gender marker change on birth certificates. This followed an executive order issued by the governor the previous year. Oklahoma Senate Bill 1100 also banned non-binary gender markers on birth certificates.

Montana also issued a rule in 2022 that banned legal gender change on birth certificates. In 2024, District Judge Mike Menahan issued an injunction blocking Montana's rule.

In 2025, North Carolina passed House Bill 805, a comprehensive measure that includes a requirement that both original and updated birth certificates be combined into a single document and retained. The law went into effect on January 1, 2026.

In January 2026, the State of Kansas passed Kansas Senate Bill 244, invalidating all driver licenses and birth certificates not issued under sex assigned at birth. The bill went into effect on February 26, 2026.

===== Cases (birth certificates) =====
The first case to consider legal gender change in the U.S. was Mtr. of Anonymous v. Weiner (1966), in which a transgender woman wished to change her name and sex on her birth certificate in New York City after having undergone gender-affirming surgery. The New York City Health Department denied the request. She took the case to court, but the court ruled that the New York City Health Code did not permit the request, which only permitted a change of sex on the birth certificate if an error was made recording it at birth.

The decision of the court in Weiner was again affirmed in Mtr. of Hartin v. Dir. of Bur. of Recs. (1973) and Anonymous v. Mellon (1977). Despite this, there can be noted as time progressed an increasing support expressed in judgments by New York courts for permitting changes in birth certificates, even though they still held to do so would require legislative action. Classification of characteristic sex is a public health matter in New York; per NY Public Health Law § 312, New York City has its own health department which operates separately and autonomously from the New York State health department.

An important case in Connecticut was Darnell v. Lloyd (1975), where the court found that substantial state interest must be demonstrated to justify refusing to grant a change in sex recorded on a birth certificate.

In K. v. Health Division (1977), the Oregon Supreme Court rejected an application for a change of name or sex on the birth certificate of a transgender man who had undergone gender-affirming surgery, on the grounds that there was no legislative authority for such a change to be made.

==== Driver's licenses and state identification cards ====
Map detailing requirements for altering gender markers on driver's license in the US Source: Identity Document Laws and Policies State allows residents to mark M, F, or X on their driver's license (22 states + D.C.) State uses easy to understand form and does not require provider certification (21 states + D.C.) State uses easy to understand form and requires provider certification (accepted from wide range of professionals) (6 states, 2 territories) State uses easy to understand form and requires provider certification (accepted from limited range of professionals) (3 states) State has no form. No court order or proof of surgery required, but burdensome process requirements and/or provider certification required from limited range of professionals (4 states) State has unclear, unknown or unwritten policy regarding gender marker changes (2 states, 1 territory) State requires proof of surgery, court order, or amended birth certificate (10 states, 2 territories) State does not allow for updating the gender marker on driver's license (4 states)

As of February 2024, all U.S. States except for Kansas and Florida allow the gender marker to be changed on a driver's license, although the requirements for doing so vary by state. Often, the requirements for changing one's driver's license are less stringent than those for changing the marker on the birth certificate. For example, until August 1, 2015, the state of Massachusetts required gender-affirming surgery for a birth certificate change, but only a form including a sworn statement from a physician that the applicant is in fact the new gender to correct the sex designation on a driver's license. As of November 2019, the Commonwealth of Massachusetts no longer requires any documentation or a sworn statement from a medical doctor to change one's gender marker on their drivers license/state ID. To change the gender marker, one only needs to fill out a new drivers license/ID card application reflecting the correct information. The state of Virginia had policies similar to those of Massachusetts, requiring gender-affirming surgery (GAS) for a birth certificate change, but not for a driver's license change. Virginia removed the requirement for surgery to change the gender marker in September 2020.

Sometimes, the states' requirements and laws conflict with and are dependent on each other; for example, a transgender woman who was born in Tennessee but living in Kentucky will be unable to have the gender marker changed on her Kentucky driver's license. This is due to the fact that Kentucky requires an amended birth certificate reflecting the person's accurate gender, but the state of Tennessee does not change gender markers on birth certificates at all.

On July 1, 2023, Kansas Senate Bill 180 went into effect, mandating that gender markers on birth certificates and driver's licenses reflect a person's sex at birth – reversing a 2019 federal equal protection lawsuit settlement which allowed birth certificates to be changed to reflect a person's gender identity. In February 2026, Kansas ordered that driver's licenses reflect a person's sex at birth.

In January 2024, Florida banned changing the gender marker on driver's licenses. Additionally, any person "misrepresenting" their gender would be subject to criminal and civil penalties.

In August 2024, the Texas Department of Public Safety (DPS) issued a statement saying they would no longer accept court orders as a basis to change a person's sex on their drivers license, effectively banning trans people from changing their sex on their drivers license. The statement also "directs drivers license employees to send the names and identification numbers of people seeking to change their sex on their license to a particular email address" with the subject line "Sex Change Court Order." Drivers license employees are also ordered to "scan into the record" court orders or other documents associated with any sex change requests. The DPS refused to say how this information will be used. However two years prior, Attorney General Ken Paxton ordered workers at DPS to gather a list of people who had changed their sex on their Texas driver's licenses and other department records.

In August 2026, the Ohio Bureau of Motor Vehicles announced that effective immediately, gender changes on driver's licenses and state ID cards would no longer be granted at the holder's request. Instead, Ohio residents seeking to change the gender markers on those cards must first update their birth certificates.

In addition, a number of states and city jurisdictions have passed legislation to allow a third gender marker on official identification documents (see below).

==== Cases ====
In May 2015, six Michigan transgender people filed Love v. Johnson in the United States District Court for the Eastern District of Michigan, challenging the state's policy requiring the information on a person's driver's license match the information on their birth certificate. This policy requires transgender people to change the information on their birth certificates to change their driver's licenses, which at the time of filing was not possible in Tennessee, Nebraska and Ohio, where three of the plaintiffs were born, and requires a court order in South Carolina, where a fourth was born. The remaining two residents were born in Michigan, and would be required to undergo surgery to change their birth certificates. The plaintiffs in the case are represented by the American Civil Liberties Union.

In November 2015, Judge Nancy Edmunds denied the State of Michigan's motion to dismiss the case.

==== Name change ====
Transgender people often seek legal recognition for a name change during a gender transition. Laws regarding name changes vary state-by-state. In some states, transgender people can change their name, provided that the change does not perpetrate fraud or enable criminal intent. In other states, the process requires a court order or statute and can be more difficult. An applicant may be required to post legal notices in newspapers to announce the name change—rules that have been criticized on grounds of privacy rights and potentially endangering transgender people to targeted hate crimes. Some courts require medical or psychiatric documentation to justify a name change, despite having no similar requirement for individuals changing names for reasons other than gender transitioning.

In April 2025, the Mississippi Supreme Court ruled that a transgender teen could not legally change his name, despite having the support of both his parents, until he turned 21 citing a "lack of maturity". The court also misgendered the teen throughout in the ruling. The legal age of majority in Mississippi is 21, however, minors are legally allowed to change their name in other circumstances in Mississippi as long as they have parental permission.

==== Death certificates ====
A study conducted by Oregon epidemiologists found that within the area of Portland, Oregon, more than half of dead trans people were recorded as their assigned sex at birth on their death certificates.

== Housing ==
Research from the 2015 U.S. Transgender Health Survey indicates that nearly 30% of transgender people have experienced homelessness at some point in their lives, with rates rising to 41% among Black transgender individuals.

Studies by the Vera Institute have documented routine verbal and physical abuse directed toward trans individuals in these facilities, further exacerbating their vulnerability and negatively impacting their mental and physical health.

In 2020, the Trump administration rolled back several Obama-era protections intended to ensure equal access to homeless shelters for transgender individuals. One controversial action was the issuance of guidelines instructing shelter staff on how to identify transgender women, a move criticized by advocates who argued that it could lead to discriminatory treatment of trans people.

=== Housing for trans youth ===
Housing instability is a pervasive issue for transgender youth in the United States. Roughly 28% of LGBTQ+ youth experience homelessness or housing instability. Studies reveal that while only 23% of cisgender boys/men and 23% of cisgender girls/women report past or current housing instability, rates among trans girls/women and trans boys/men rise to 38% and 39% respectively, with nonbinary youth at 35% and gender-questioning youth at 24%.

Transgender youth experiencing housing instability are two to four times more likely to report severe mental health challenges (including depression, anxiety, self-harm, and suicidal ideation) compared to their stably housed peers. For instance, among LGBTQ+ youth with stable housing, 35% have seriously considered suicide and 10% have attempted it. In contrast, those who have experienced past housing instability report rates of 58% for suicidal ideation and 28% for suicide attempts, while youth who are currently homeless report rates as high as 62% and 35%, respectively. The risk of victimization also increases with housing instability: youth with stable housing report threat rates due to sexual orientation and gender identity at 10% and 14%, respectively; these numbers climb to 26% and 34% for those with past instability, and further to 30% and 39% among youth who are currently homeless.

The transition from a stable housing situation, where 35% report considering suicide and 10% report suicide attempts, to a state of past instability, with figures of 58% and 28%. Among those currently homeless, the rates further increase to 62% and 35%, which illustrates a clear gradient of risk corresponding to housing conditions. When examining victimization, the baseline threat due to gender identity at 14% in stable conditions rises to 34% with past instability and 39% when currently homeless.

Cisgender youth, both boys/men and girls/women, report housing instability at a rate of 23%, whereas the rates for trans girls/women and trans boys/men are substantially higher, at 38% and 39% respectively. Nonbinary youth also face a high rate of instability at 35%, with gender-questioning youth reporting slightly lower rates at 24%.

In response to this, several efforts have emerged at the policy and institutional level to address LGBTQ+ youth homelessness. Experts have emphasized the need for stronger anti-discrimination protections, such as those proposed in the federal Equality Act, which would add sexual orientation and gender identity as protected classes under the Civil Rights Act. Researchers and advocates also call for increased investment in equitable housing, better inclusion of LGBTQ+ data in federal surveys, and the development of targeted resources, including LGBTQ-affirming shelters and transitional housing programs.

== Genocide ==
Some critics, including journalists Emily St. James and Saeed Jones and civil rights lawyer Chase Strangio, have described US laws as fitting the United Nations' definition of genocide, such as those laws which ban proper transgender healthcare ("causing serious bodily or mental harm to members of the group; deliberately inflicting on the group conditions of life calculated to bring about its physical destruction in whole or in part"), and those mandating that trans children be taken away by the state ("forcibly transferring children of the group to another group").

On March 3, 2023, at the Conservative Political Action Conference, political commentator Michael Knowles declared that "If it is false, then for the good of society, and especially for the good of the poor people who have fallen prey to this confusion, transgenderism must be eradicated from public life entirely—the whole preposterous ideology, at every level." This statement, and other parts of his speech, led the Lemkin Institute for Genocide Prevention to raise a 'Red Flag Alert' in the US, stating "Now that ideologues of hate can openly call for the elimination of transgender identity – in the very country that has been most open to the transgender community over the last decade – we are at a new stage in the global threat against transgender people."

Transgender healthcare bans have been described as dire by members of the medical community. A medical report which was published by Yale in response to bans on gender-affirming care argued that the bans were no more ethical than a prohibition on healthcare for any other life-threatening medical condition. The president of the World Professional Association of Transgender Health (WPATH) wrote an opinion article in the New York Times stating her view that these laws constituted an effort to "rid the world of transgender people." Similar sentiments were expressed in a WPATH public communique: "Anti-transgender health care legislation is not about protections for children but about eliminating transgender persons on a micro and macro scale." The passage of legislation against transgender youth has seen increases in calls to Trans Lifeline, a suicide crisis hotline run by and for transgender people.

According to the legal definition of crimes against humanity which is propagated at the Hague by the International Criminal Court, "'extermination' includes the intentional infliction of conditions of life, inter alia the deprivation of access to food and medicine, calculated to bring about the destruction of part of a population" when "pursuant to or in furtherance of a State or organizational policy to commit such attack."

In a 2015 interview with CBC Radio, Terryn Witten, an expert on transgender violence, said that if just looking at the United States, she would not use the term genocide and instead refer to it as "rampant murder". Witten does argue that when taking a global perspective, there is a transgender genocide ongoing. In the same interview, hate crime expert Bernie Farber of the Canadian Jewish Congress contested the use of the term "transgender genocide" to describe the situation internationally or in the US or Canada due to the state offering protections to trans people in contrast with the state taking a policy of elimination. He described it as being insensitive to victims of recognized genocides, such as the Holocaust, because it does not meet the legal test, despite the "terrible crimes against the community." He argued that it could be applicable on a national level in certain locations, such as in Russia or Uganda.

== Governments' lists of trans people ==
The compiling of lists of transgender citizens by governments, such as the list which was compiled by the state of Texas in 2022, has been criticized by trans advocates who feared the state would "use the information to further persecute the already vulnerable trans community." In August 2024, the Texas Department of Public Safety (DPS) issued a statement saying they would no longer accept court orders as a basis to change a person's sex on their drivers license, effectively banning trans people from changing their sex on their drivers license. The statement also "directs drivers license employees to send the names and identification numbers of people seeking to change their sex on their license to a particular email address" with the subject line "Sex Change Court Order." Drivers license employees are also ordered to "scan into the record" court orders or other documents associated with any sex change requests. The DPS refused to say how this information will be used.

In June 2023, the Attorney General's office for the state of Tennessee mandated the Vanderbilt University Medical Center to turn over the medical records of all of its transgender patients. The VUMC complied.

== Trump presidency (2025–present) ==
As part of his 2024 presidential campaign, Donald Trump stated that, if elected, he would sign an executive order instructing every federal agency to cease the promotion of sex or gender transition at any age as well as ask Congress to pass a bill stating that the United States will only recognize two genders as determined at birth, and promised to crackdown on gender-affirming care for all ages. Additionally, he stated that he would make hospitals and health care providers that provide transitional hormones or surgery ineligible for federal funding, including Medicare and Medicaid funding, and that he would push to prohibit hormonal and surgical intervention for minors in all 50 states. He followed through with a series of executive orders after he took office.

=== Executive Order 14168 ===
On January 20, 2025, shortly after his inauguration ceremony, Trump signed the executive order that requires federal agencies to treat sex as a male–female binary, with "female" and "male" defined as "a person belonging, at conception to the sex that produces the large reproductive cell" and a "person belonging, at conception, to the sex that produces the small reproductive cell" respectively. The order also mandated that:

- Federal agencies should use "sex" instead of "gender", remove materials that "promote gender ideology", and halt "funding of gender ideology"
- Official government documents such as passports and visas stop allowing self-selection of gender
- Transgender people be barred from government-funded single-sex facilities congruent with their gender identity
- The Bureau of Prisons halt any federal funding for gender-affirming care.
- That federal funding no longer go to gender-affirming care
- The attorney general provide guidance "to correct the misapplication of the Supreme Court's decision in Bostock v. Clayton County (2020) to sex-based distinctions" in federal agency activities.
- Prior policies and federal government documents that are inconsistent with this order be rescinded, including policies that require the use of names and pronouns consistent with a person's gender identity in federal workplaces.

Provisions of the order have faced legal challenges, with temporary restraining orders having been issued to suspend the withholding of federal funding to programs that fund gender-affirming care and promote "gender ideology", the forced transfers of transgender inmates to facilities congruent with their sex assigned at birth, and the mass removal of documents published by the Centers for Disease Control and Prevention, Food and Drug Administration, Department of Health and Human Services that mention topics related to "gender ideology".

=== Executive Order 14183 ===
On January 27, 2025, Trump signed an executive order declaring that a soldier being trans "conflicts with a soldier's commitment to an honorable, truthful, and disciplined lifestyle, even in one's personal life" and that trans people "cannot satisfy the rigorous standards necessary for military service".

On March 18, 2025, Judge Ana C. Reyes blocked the executive order, ruling that banning trans people from the military likely violated their constitutional rights.

=== Executive Order 14187 ===
On January 28, 2025, Trump signed an executive order to "Protect Children from Chemical and Surgical Mutilation". The order described gender-affirming care for minors as "chemical and surgical mutilation of children" as well as "maiming" and "sterilizing". It stated "countless children" who received such care would regret a "horrifying tragedy that they will never be able to conceive children of their own or nurture their children through breastfeeding." The order also described the World Professional Association for Transgender Health's (WPATH) guidance as "junk science".

The order states that the US Federal Government will not "fund, sponsor, promote, assist, or support the so-called 'transition' of a child from one sex to another." The provisions include:

- Directing the United States Department of Health and Human Services to review the terms of insurance under Medicare, Medicaid, and the Affordable Care Act to end certain gender affirming care;
- Told federal agencies providing federal grants to medical institutions to make sure those institutions were not carrying out any gender-related procedures;
- Protects whistleblowers who report on institutions that provide gender affirming care in violation of the executive order.

In response, some hospitals paused providing gender-affirming care for minors, while others continued. Attorneys general from 15 states said their states are committed to continuing to provide gender-affirming care to minors. Multiple groups filed lawsuits challenging the legality of the executive order. In response to one of the lawsuits, several federal judges issued injunctions blocking the government from withholding federal funds from hospitals that provide gender affirming care to minors. Following the injunction, some hospitals that initially paused gender-affirming care for minors resumed the care.

In the summer of that year, the Department of Justice began sending subpoenas to "over 20" hospitals demanding the full records of patients who received medical care under 19 – including their names, social security numbers, doctors' notes, and treatments prescribed.

=== Federal funding freeze ===
On January 28, 2025, Trump ordered a freeze on all federal funding grants, loans, and aid while those receiving them were assessed to make sure they were not promoting "advance Marxist equity, transgenderism, and green new deal social engineering policies".

=== Executive Order 14190 ===
On January 29, 2025, Trump signed an executive order "Ending Radical Indoctrination in K-12 Schooling".

=== Executive Order 14201 ===
On February 5, 2025, Trump signed an executive order titled "Keeping Men Out of Women's Sports", which directs federal agencies and state attorneys general to immediately enforce a prohibition of transgender girls and women from participating in women's sports. The order does not ban transgender men athletes from playing on male sports teams. As part of this order's implementation, the Department of Education urged high school and college athletics organizations NCAA and NFHS to revoke female transgender athletes' records and restore cisgender athletes' ones. The State Department also announced a ban on transgender athletes from entering the United States if they attempt to compete in women's sports, and that visa applicants suspected of such would have their file marked with the letters 'SWS25' for the purposes of tracking.

=== Firearm rights ===
The Trump administration is purportedly looking to restrict transgender people's right to possess firearms. Talks to that effect were held in the wake of the Minneapolis Annunciation Catholic Church shooting.

== Physical violence ==
A 2014 report by the Department of Justice found that 2% of trans people report being physically attacked upon visiting a doctor's office, with 3% reporting being forcibly subjected to unwanted medical procedures.

According to a study published by the UCLA Williams Institute, transgender people are the victims of violent crimes at over four times the rate of cisgender people. The study found that from 2017 to 2018, trans people experienced violent victimizations at a rate of 86.2 per 1000 people, compared to 21.7 among cis people. Trans women suffered at a rate of 86.1 per 1000, compared to cis women's 23.7, and trans men suffered at a rate of 107.5 per 1000 compared to cis men's 19.8.

According to the Department of Justice in 2022, 50% of people who die in anti-LGBT hate crimes are trans women, with sexual assault being a frequent occurrence after their murders. Additionally, 50% of transgender people are physically abused after coming out as trans to a significant other.

In June 2022, NBC reported "Events for transgender rights (…) have become frequent targets of extremists, militias, and far-right personalities".

In August 2022, a draft report from the California Attorney General's Office found that trans people were four times more likely to be stopped by police for "reasonable suspicion" than cis people.

== Sexual violence ==
According to the Department of Justice in 2022, 66% of trans people experience sexual assault at some point in their lives. 15% of trans people report being sexually assaulted by police or prison staff (32% for African-American trans people), while another 10% report being sexually assaulted by healthcare professionals. An older study conducted by the DOJ in 2014 also found that it was not uncommon for psychiatric professionals to mandate that trans patients of theirs perform sexual favors for them in exchange for continued access to gender affirming healthcare.

The Trafficking in Persons report by the State Department found that trans people are significantly overrepresented in sex trafficking victims, and a study by Loyola University Chicago found that trans people in the US are 5.6x more likely to engage in survival sex—where sex is traded for money, food, shelter, or other essential items such as phones or clothing—than their cis peers.

According to the 2015 US Transgender survey, 13% of K-12 students who were out as or perceived as transgender were sexually assaulted specifically for being transgender.

It is considered relatively common for transgender people to be subjected to pat downs and secondary searches while going through airport security, due to their body types deviating from the presets expected by the body scanners. These searches can range from being groped in the groin area, to being forced to strip entirely.

== Discrimination protections ==
=== Employment ===
Transgender employment rights in the United States prior to the ruling in R.G. & G.R. Harris Funeral Homes Inc. v. Equal Employment Opportunity Commission. Discrimination prohibited in public and private employment Discrimination prohibited in public employment only No enumerated protections

In June 2020, the U.S. Supreme Court ruled for the first time on a case directly regarding Transgender rights. In the case R.G. & G.R. Harris Funeral Homes Inc. v. Equal Employment Opportunity Commission, the Supreme Court held that Title VII of the Civil Rights Act 1964 extends protections to individuals who are transgender in Employment. This is based on discrimination on the grounds of transgender status is a form of discrimination based on sex. Prior to the rulings that Title VII protections covered transgender status, four states (Alaska, Arizona, Wisconsin, and Missouri) had not enacted specific protections based on transgender status in any employment, and 22 states had extended protections to public employment only.

=== Laws ===
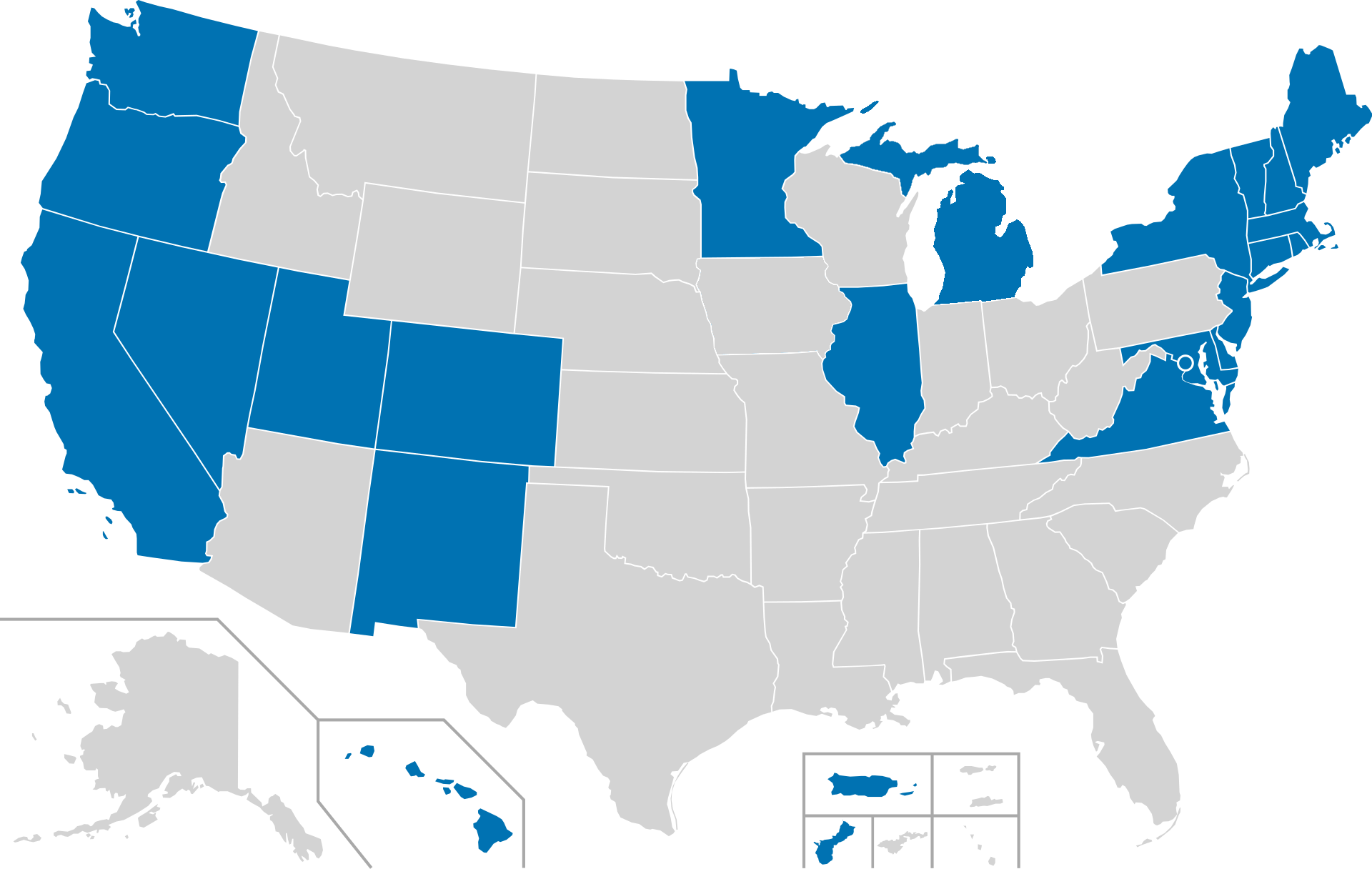
States that prohibit housing discrimination based on gender identity as of June 2025 Prohibits housing discrimination based on gender identity No enumerated protections

==== Federal laws ====
There is no federal law designating transgender as a protected class, or specifically requiring equal treatment for transgender people. Some versions of the Employment Non-Discrimination Act introduced in the U.S. Congress have included protections against discrimination for transgender people, but as of 2021 no version of ENDA has passed. Whether or not to include such language has been a controversial part of the debate over the bill. In 2016 and again in 2017, Rep. Pete Olson [R-TX] introduced legislation to strictly interpret gender identity according to biology, which would end federal civil rights protection of gender identity. It remains legal at the federal level for parents to subject transgender children to conversion therapy.

On October 4, 2017, Attorney General Jeff Sessions released a Department of Justice memo stating that Title VII of the 1964 Civil Rights Act prohibits discrimination based on sex, which he stated "is ordinarily defined to mean biologically male or female", but the law "does not prohibit discrimination based on gender identity per se".

On January 30, 2012, HUD Secretary Shaun Donovan announced new regulations that would require all housing providers that receive HUD funding to prevent housing discrimination based on sexual orientation or gender identity. These regulations went into effect on March 5, 2012.

In October 2026, the U.S. Department of Health and Human Services issued a final rule (effective in January 2027) that excludes gender dysphoria from the definition of disability in its Section 504 implementation regulations unless the gender dysphoria results from a physical impairment.

==== State and local laws ====
Over 225 jurisdictions including the District of Columbia (as of 2016) and 22 states (as of 2018) feature legislation that prohibit discrimination based on gender identity in either employment, housing, and/or public accommodations. In Anchorage, Alaska, voters chose in April 2018 to keep the existing protections for transgender people. In Massachusetts, a state law prohibited discrimination in public accommodations on the basis of gender identity; in October 2016, anti-transgender activists submitted the minimum number of signatures necessary to the Secretary of the Commonwealth of within Massachusetts to put the law up for repeal on a statewide ballot measure, Massachusetts voters chose on November 6, 2018 to retain the state law, with 68% in favor of upholding law, and 32% opposed. The Massachusetts Gender Identity Anti-Discrimination Initiative was the first-ever statewide ballot question of its kind in the United States.

Some states and cities have banned conversion therapy for minors.

| State | Date effective | Employment | Housing | Public accommodations |
|---|---|---|---|---|
| Minnesota | 1993 | Yes | Yes | Yes |
| Rhode Island | Dec 6, 1995 (public accommodation); July 17, 2001 (employment and housing) | Yes | Yes | Yes |
| New Mexico | July 1, 2003 (employment and housing); 2004 (public accommodation) | Yes | Yes | Yes |
| California | 2004 (employment and housing); Oct 9, 2011 (public accommodations) | Yes | Yes | Yes |
| District of Columbia | 2005 (employment and housing); March 8, 2006 (public accommodations) | Yes | Yes | Yes |
| Maine | December 28, 2005 | Yes | Yes | Yes |
| Illinois | 2005 (employment and housing); 2006 (public accommodations) | Yes | Yes | Yes |
| Hawaii | July 11, 2005 (housing and public accommodations); May 5, 2011 (employment) | Yes | Yes | Yes |
| Washington | 2006 | Yes | Yes | Yes |
| New Jersey | 2006 | Yes | Yes | Yes |
| Vermont | 2007 | Yes | Yes | Yes |
| Oregon | 2007 | Yes | Yes | Yes |
| Michigan | Codified in March 2023 | Yes | Yes | Yes |
| Iowa | 2007–2025 (protections repealed July 1, 2025) | Yes | Yes | Yes |
| Colorado | 2007 (employment and housing); 2008 (public accommodations) | Yes | Yes | Yes |
| Nevada | 2011 | Yes | Yes | Yes |
| Connecticut | October 1, 2011 | Yes | Yes | Yes |
| Massachusetts | 2012 (employment and housing); 2016 (public accommodations) | Yes | Yes | Yes |
| Delaware | 2013 | Yes | Yes | Yes |
| Maryland | 2014 | Yes | Yes | Yes |
| Utah | 2015 | Yes | Yes | No |
| New York | January 20, 2016 | Yes | Yes | Yes |
| New Hampshire | July 8, 2018 | Yes | Yes | Yes |
| Virginia | July 1, 2020 | Yes | Yes | Yes |

=== Cases ===
In 2000, a court ruling in Connecticut determined that conventional sex discrimination laws protected transgender persons. However, in 2011, to clarify and codify this ruling, a separate law was passed defining legal anti-discrimination protections on the basis of gender identity.

On October 16, 1976, the Court rejected plaintiff's appeal in sex discrimination case involving termination from teaching job after gender-affirming surgery from a New Jersey school system.

Carroll v. Talman Fed. Savs. & Loan Association, 604 F.2d 1028, 1032 (7th Cir.) 1979, held that dress codes are permissible. "So long as [dress codes] and some justification in commonly accepted social norms and are reasonably related to the employer's business needs, such regulations are not necessarily violations of Title VII even though the standards prescribed differ somewhat for men and women."

In Ulane v. Eastern Airlines Inc. 742 F.2d 1081 (7th Cir. 1984) Karen Ulane, a pilot who was assigned male at birth, underwent gender-affirming surgery to attain typically female characteristics. The Seventh Circuit denied Title VII sex discrimination protection by narrowly interpreting "sex" discrimination as discrimination "against women" [and denying Ulane's womanhood].

The case of Price Waterhouse v. Hopkins 490 U.S. 228 (1989), expanded the protection of Title VII by prohibiting gender discrimination, which includes sex stereotyping. In that case, a woman who was discriminated against by her employer for being too "masculine" was granted Title VII relief.

Oncale v. Sundowner Offshore Services, Inc. 523 U.S. 75 (1998), found that same-sex sexual harassment is actionable under Title VII.

A gender stereotype is an assumption about how a person should dress which could encompass a significant range of transgender behavior. This potentially significant change in the law was not tested until Smith v. City of Salem, 378 F.3d 566, 568 (6th Cir. 2004). Smith, a trans woman, had been employed as a lieutenant in the fire department without incident for seven years. After doctors diagnosed Smith with Gender Identity Disorder ("GID"), she began to experience harassment and retaliation following complaint. She filed Title VII claims of sex discrimination and retaliation, equal protection and due process claims under 42 U.S.C. § 1983, and state law claims of invasion of privacy and civil conspiracy. On appeal, the Price Waterhouse precedent was applied at p. 574: "[i]t follows that employers who discriminate against men because they do wear dresses and makeup, or otherwise act femininely, are also engaging in sex discrimination, because the discrimination would not occur but for the victim's sex." Chow (2005 at p. 214) comments that the Sixth Circuit's holding and reasoning represents a significant victory for transgender people. By reiterating that discrimination based on both sex and gender expression is forbidden under Title VII, the court steers transgender jurisprudence in a more expansive direction. But dress codes, which frequently have separate rules based solely on gender, continue. Carroll v. Talman Fed. Savs. & Loan Association, 604 F.2d 1028, 1032 (7th Cir.) 1979, has not been overruled.

Harrah's implemented a policy named "Personal Best", in which it dictated a general dress code for its male and female employees. Females were required to wear makeup, and there were similar rules for males. One female employee, Darlene Jesperson, objected and sued under Title VII. In Jespersen v. Harrah's Operating Co., No. 03-15045 (9th Cir. April 14, 2006), plaintiff conceded that dress codes could be legitimate but that certain aspects could nevertheless be demeaning; plaintiff also cited Price Waterhouse. The Ninth Circuit disagreed, upholding the practice of business-related gender-specific dress codes. When such a dress code is in force, an employee amid transition could find it impossible to obey the rules.

In Glenn v. Brumby, the 11th Circuit Court of Appeals held that the Equal Protection Clause prevented the state of Georgia from discriminating against an employee for being transgender.

== Disenfranchisement ==
Transgender disenfranchisement is the restriction of suffrage for transgender individuals, and more broadly participation in civic and economic life, due to bureaucratic, institutional, and social barriers.

=== Voter identification ===
One-quarter of eligible transgender voters as of 2022 did not have identity documents (ID) that match their name and gender according to a study by the Williams Institute; a different study by the Center for American Progress found the number to be nearly double that figure. Less than 1% of voters reported being turned away due to a mismatch of their gender identity and their ID in the 2014 Advocates for Trans Equality (ATE) survey.

As of 2025, thirty-six states had laws requiring or requesting in-person voters produce an ID, ten of which are strict photo ID states, which require the ID be government-issued. These states also require a state-approved excuse for a mail-in ballot; lack of proper ID due to being transgender is not accepted. In the ATE survey, only 5% of registered transgender voters did not vote because of issues related to updating their IDs. In the state of Georgia, the law requires a detailed medical history and full transition in order to update the gender marker.

In 2025, the United States House of Representatives passed a bill introduced by Chip Roy called the Safeguard American Voter Eligibility Act requiring proof of citizenship in which the name on a voter's ID matches the name on their citizenship document. According to the ATE survey, 89% of transgender people have IDs which do not match their citizenship document, thus enacting the law would make them ineligible to vote.

Dean Black faced backlash in 2024 for a proposed Florida law in which all ID gender markers would be required to match a person's gender assigned at birth. The vice president of the Florida State University chapter of the Students for a Democratic Society called the bill a "blatant attempt at trans disenfranchisement." The American Civil Liberties Union of Florida opposed the bill, which advanced out of the Florida House of Representatives committee. The bill died afterward.

=== Felony disenfranchisement ===
In the United States, people convicted of felonies and, in all but two states and Washington, D.C., incarcerated people convicted of any crime are barred from voting. In the 1840s, during the mass urbanization of cities like San Francisco and St. Louis, anti-cross-dressing laws in the united states were enacted across the United States. The laws were repealed in the 1970s, but in many states there exist “walking while trans” laws in which the possession of condoms warrants probable cause.

Black transgender women are 21% more likely than the general population to be incarcerated at least once. Felony disenfranchisement rates are second highest among transgender women when compared to other genders, according to the 2016 Black Census Project. Black transgender individuals are more likely than other demographics to engage in the underground economy, correlated with higher reports of voter ineligibility due to a previous felony conviction. Employment discrimination and unemployment are directly related to transgender individuals' participating in sex work. In the entertainment industry, "transface" casting limits access to legal and legitimate work opportunities, despite that projects such as Orange Is the New Black have created mainstream showcase and sympathy for transgender people.

== Displacement and sanctuary states ==
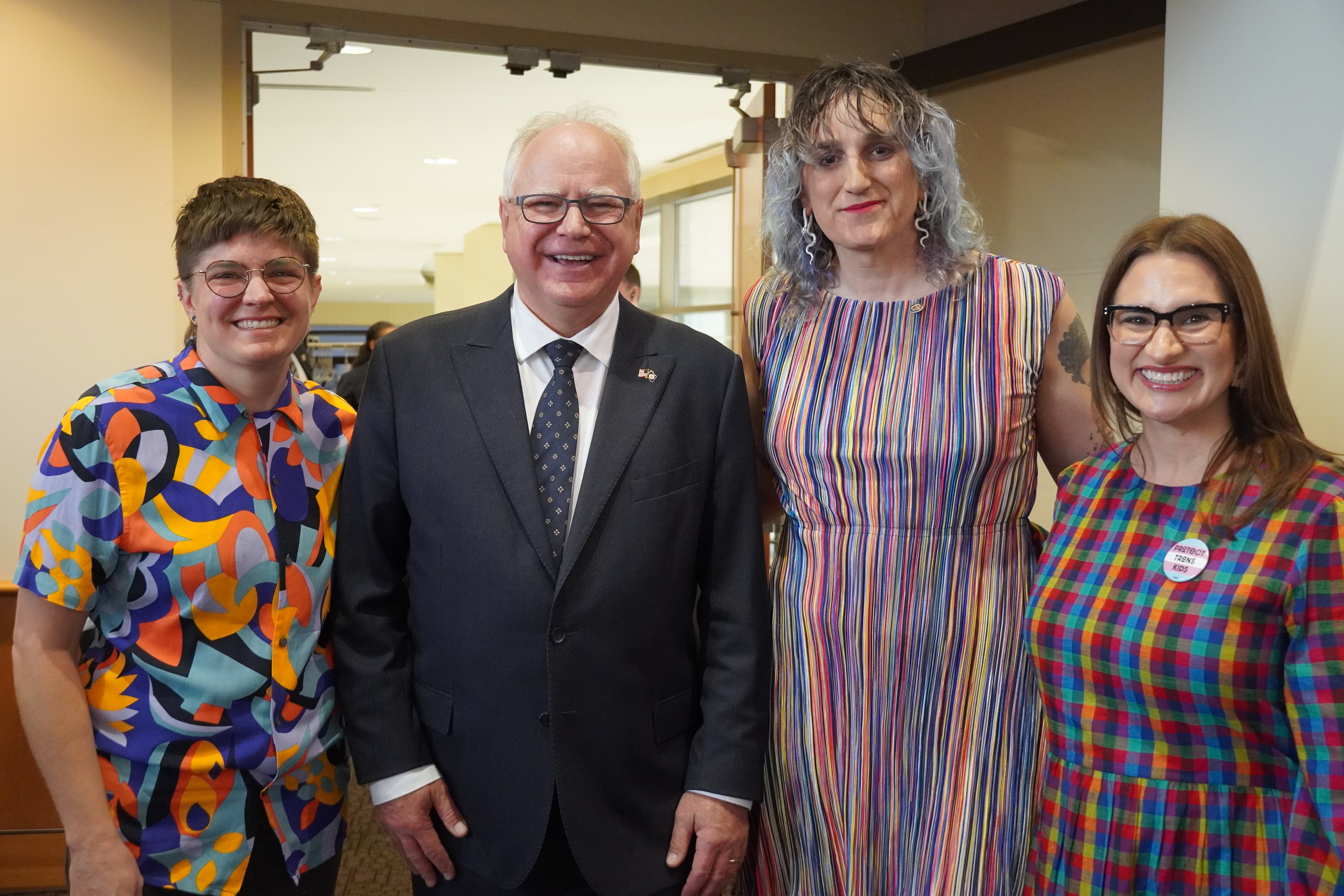
Minnesota governor Tim Walz and state representative Leigh Finke in April 2023 at the signing of a bill to establish Minnesota as a "trans refuge" state

The enactment of restrictions on gender-affirming care and related policies in several conservative states has been associated with instances of transgender individuals and their families relocating to other states or countries. Such moves have occurred in response to legal uncertainty, access to healthcare, and concerns about civil or criminal liability.

In response, a number of states have enacted laws intended to limit cooperation with out-of-state investigations or legal actions related to gender-affirming care that is lawful within their own jurisdictions. Connecticut was the first state to adopt such a law in 2022, initially alongside similar protections for reproductive healthcare providers and recipients. Since then, Massachusetts, California, Illinois, Minnesota, New Jersey, New Mexico, Vermont, Colorado, Washington, New York, Arizona, Maine, Rhode Island, Oregon, Maryland, and the District of Columbia have enacted comparable measures. Transgender employees are nationally protected from employment discrimination following a 2020 ruling where the Supreme Court held that Title VII protections against sex discrimination in employment extended to transgender employees. Attempts to pass an Equality Act to prohibit discrimination on the basis of gender identity in employment, housing, public accommodations, education, federally funded programs, credit, and jury service, have all been unsuccessful. These laws generally restrict state or local participation in extradition requests, subpoenas, or civil judgments arising from conduct that is legal under the protecting state's law.

According to a June 2023 survey conducted by Data for Progress, 8 percent of transgender adults in the United States reported that they had relocated from their community or state due to legislation they perceived as hostile to transgender people.

== Drag shows ==
On March 2, 2023, Tennessee governor Bill Lee signed the Adult Entertainment Act, which prohibits drag performances for children. This bill sparked outrage from the LGBT community. On June 3, 2023, a federal judge ruled that the law is unconstitutional. On July 18, 2024, a three judge panel on the Sixth Circuit reinstated the law by ruling that the plaintiffs had lacked the standing to sue. The ruling did not address whether the law was constitutional.

The states of Florida, Montana, and Texas have also passed laws banning public drag performances. However, all three of these drag show bans were blocked by courts from taking effect. In November 2025, the U.S. Court of Appeals for the Fifth Circuit reversed the lower court's ban of the Texas law (S.B. 12) which regulates sexually oriented performances on public property and in the presence of minors.

== Education ==
State law prohibits LGBT inclusive instruction in the classroom as of May 2023 State law prohibits LGBT inclusive instruction in the classroom up to a certain age and requires parental notification past that age. State law requires parental notification of LGBT inclusive instruction and allows parents to opt their children out. State law explicitly requires LGBT inclusion in state curricular standards.

The Obama administration took the position that Title IX's prohibition on discrimination on the basis of "sex" encompasses discrimination on the basis of gender identity and gender expression. In 2016, the Fourth Circuit became the first Court of Appeals to agree with the administration on the scope of Title IX as applied to transgender students, in the case of Virginia high school student Gavin Grimm (G.G. v. Gloucester County School Board). The validity of the executive's position is being tested further in the federal courts. In 2017 the ACLU, representing Grimm, stated that they had stopped Grimm's "request for an immediate halt to the Gloucester County School Board's policy prohibiting him and other transgender students from using the common restrooms at school" but were "moving forward with his claim for damages and his demand to end the anti-trans policy permanently." Judge Allen of the U.S. District Court of the Eastern District of Virginia, in May 2018, ruled that Grimm's discrimination claim was valid based upon Title IX and the U.S. Constitution's equal protection clause.

=== Executive Order 14190 ===
In 2025, after Donald Trump signed an executive order prohibiting federal agencies from recognizing transgender identity, the U.S. Department of Education told all employees to end all programs, contracts, and policies that "fail to affirm the reality of biological sex" by affirming transgender people. Another executive order titled "Ending Radical Indoctrination in K-12 Schooling" declares transgender ideas or concepts to be "anti-American" and "subversive", and directs law enforcement to criminally prosecute any teacher who "unlawfully facilitates" the social transition of a transgender minor. Listed examples of unlawful facilitation include psychiatric counseling by a school counselor, referring to the student using their preferred name and/or pronouns, referring to a student as "nonbinary", and allowing the student to use segregated facilities or participate on segregated sports teams differing from those of their assigned sex. The order directs that educators in violation of this law be prosecuted as having committed sexual exploitation of a minor, and/or practicing medicine without a license. Additionally, schools found in violation would have their federal funding revoked. The order conflicted with preexisting legal precedents, as federal courts had protected gender identity from discrimination in schooling, and the federal government had limited jurisdiction over curriculum.

=== Anti-discrimination ===
According to the Vera Institute in 2016, "transgender youth are more likely to leave school due to harassment, physical assault, and sexual violence". In 2016, guidance was issued by the Departments of Justice and Education stating that schools which receive federal money must treat a student's gender identity as their sex (for example, in regard to bathrooms). However, this policy was revoked in 2017.

The U.S. Department of Agriculture requires schools participating in federal food assistance programs to investigate allegations of discrimination due to sexual orientation or gender identity. In July 2022, Texas, along with more than 20 other states, sued to overturn this requirement.

=== Parental authority ===
In 2024, the U.S. House of Representatives considered the "Parental Rights Over The Education and Care of Their Kids Act" aka the "PROTECT Kids Act" (HR 736). Students up to Grade 8 would need "parental consent" to change their "gender markers, pronouns, or preferred name on any school form" or "sex-based accommodations, including locker rooms or bathrooms." Schools that ignore the requirement for parental consent would lose federal funding. This bill was merged into the "Parental Bill of Rights Act" and passed the House in 2024.

=== State and local policies ===
Local K-12 school boards have adopted a variety of policies regarding trans students, ranging from allowing fully equal rights and non-discrimination for trans students, to requiring trans students to submit to a criminal background check to be allowed to use the bathroom consistent with their gender identity, to implementing full bans on expressing one's self-declared gender at all, including bans on chosen pronouns and pride flags, to even bans on mentioning the very existence of trans people.

States have similarly passed laws both protecting and restricting LGBT inclusion in classrooms. In 2014, the Maryland Senate passed a bill that "bans discrimination based on sexual orientation and sexual identity but includes an exemption for religious organizations, private clubs and educational institutions.

In 2022, the state of Florida enacted the Parental Rights in Education Act, commonly known as the "Don't Say Gay Bill", banning any "classroom discussion about sexual orientation or gender identity" by school personnel or third parties, up through third grade. For older students, any discussion of such must be "age appropriate or developmentally appropriate", with the goal to, according to the text of the legislation, "reinforce the fundamental right of parents to make decisions regarding the upbringing and control of their children". As of July 2022, five more states have enacted similar laws. In early 2023, a national proposal based on this Florida law was introduced as HR 5, "The Parents Bill of Rights Act." In July 2022, the Florida Department of Education issued a memo to all Florida schools referring to transgender non-discrimination policies regarding access to public facilities as "imposing a sexual ideology" on schools, saying that any school that did not sufficiently discriminate against transgender students could be acting in violation of state law.

As of April 2024, at least six states—Alabama, Arizona, Arkansas, Idaho, Indiana and North Carolina—have laws that, if a teacher believes a child is transgender, the teacher must notify the child's parents. Additionally, Virginia asked schools to write guidance on this matter. In 2025, the Utah legislature passed a bill banning transgender students of public universities from living in dorms consistent with their gender identity.

In November 2025, the 6th Circuit ruled against Ohio's fourth-largest school district's policy that punished students for refusing to use transgender students’ preferred pronouns.

In California, parents challenged state policies requiring public schools to keep information about a student's gender transition confidential from parents unless the student consents to disclosure. In March 2026, the U.S. Supreme Court, in Mirabelli v. Bonta, granted an emergency request by the parents and held, in a 6-3 per curiam order, that the parents were likely to succeed on their Free Exercise Clause claims. The Court vacated the Ninth Circuit's stay and blocked enforcement of the state policies while litigation continues.

== Employment ==
In a 2021 survey by the UCLA Williams Institute, 48.8% of trans people reported experiencing employment discrimination due to their trans status. 43.8% reported receiving verbal harassment in the workplace for being trans, and 22.4% reported being sexually harassed in the workplace in the preceding five years.

According to the Human Rights Campaign, in 2021 transgender women in the US were paid 60 cents for every dollar the average worker was paid.

A study conducted by the Center for Public Integrity in July 2022 found that in preceding month, 30% of trans adults had lost their jobs or lived with someone who had, and that in that month trans people experienced hunger at more than twice the rate that cis people did. According to Ross Wicks, director of LGBTQ+ Canadian non-profit Pflag, While more than 60% of Americans favor transgender rights in education and public employment, 41% support a ban on teaching about gender identity in elementary schools.

According to the 2022 US Transgender Survey, 18% of all trans adults face unemployment, while the number living below the poverty line is 34%.

In February 2025, the U.S. Equal Employment Opportunity Commission moved to dismiss six of its own pending cases alleging gender identity discrimination: One in Alabama, one in California, three in Illinois and one in New York. It cited Trump's January 20, 2025, executive order, "Defending Women From Gender Ideology Extremism and Restoring Biological Truth to the Federal Government", which defines sex as binary.

== Public factors ==
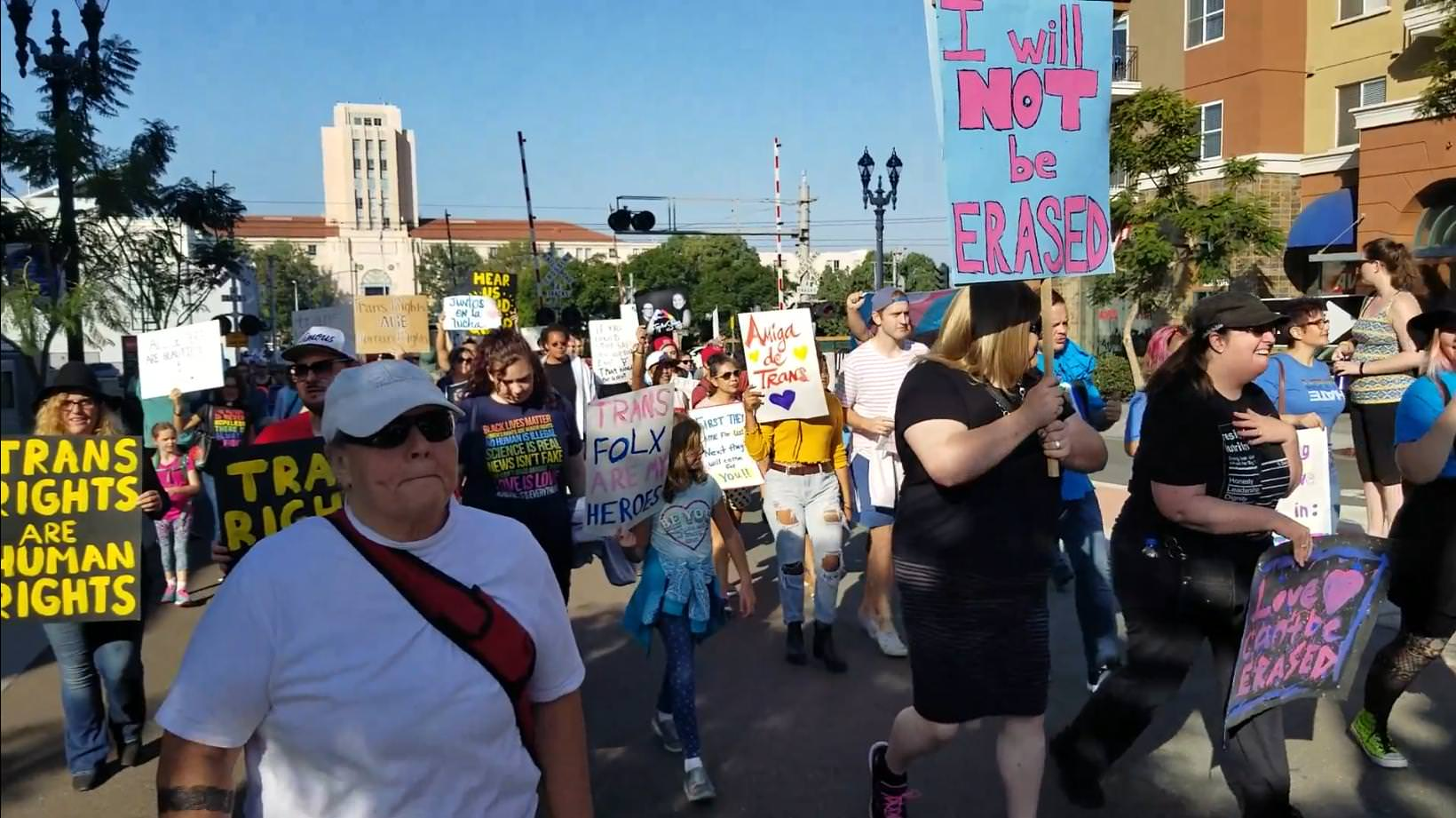
Protest in support of transgender rights in San Diego, California, in 2018

Public support for transgender people has shifted in recent years.

As of 2021, a PBS report found that an "overwhelming" majority of Americans regardless of party affiliation supported maintaining the rights of transgender Americans, and opposed laws that would restrict their access to healthcare.

According to the Public Religion Research Institute, support for mandating that trans people use the bathroom corresponding to their gender assigned at birth has risen among all religious groups, with white Protestant evangelicals being the highest change, going from 41% in support to 72% in support between 2017 and 2021. 41% of total Americans hold this stance, with 31% disagreeing, and 28% not holding a position on the issue. However, according to a 2022 meta-analysis of research studies, these views vary widely between religious groups and denominations. The meta-analysis states that religiously Jewish people were more likely to report more positive attitudes towards transgender people, and Black Protestant Christians were more likely to endorse that gender can be different from the one assigned at birth.

60% of American adults reported in the summer of 2022 that they opposed allowing nonbinary marker options on government documents, while 58% reported supporting mandating that trans athletes compete on teams matching their gender assigned at birth.

On the other hand, most Americans have more positive attitudes regarding transgender individuals in the workplace. Notably, American adults overreport their support in surveys.

=== Social media ===
In 2019, a report analyzing 10 million US and UK social media posts over three and a half years found that of that 10 million social media posts, 15% (1.5 million) expressed transphobic sentiment.

A study conducted by Media Matters between February 2019 and February 2020 found that the top five most-interacted sources on Facebook regarding transgender people were LifeSite News, the Daily Caller, the Daily Wire, Western Journal, and the Alliance Defending Freedom, with right wing sources on trans issues receiving 43.33 million interactions, compared to left wing sources receiving only 2.56 million.

In the wake of the Colorado Springs nightclub shooting, in which a man walked into an LGBTQ nightclub and opened fire, Twitter unbanned the accounts of several major anti-trans figures that had previously been suspended for breaking Twitter policies regarding the targeting of LGBTQ people.

=== Politicians ===
In 2021, Republican Representative Bob Good from Virginia stated his belief that the high suicide rates among trans youth were in fact due to sexual "grooming" into being transgender. Senate Candidate Herschel Walker from Georgia was also reported as saying that trans children would not be able to get into heaven.

In February 2022, United States Senate candidate JD Vance from Ohio attributed the then looming Russian invasion of Ukraine to transgender rights, saying "We didn't serve in the Marine Corps to go and fight Vladimir Putin because he didn't believe in transgender rights"

In May 2022, United States Representative Paul Gosar issued a statement via Twitter claiming that the mass shooter in the Uvalde school shooting which killed 19 elementary school children, was a "transsexual leftist illegal alien".

A joint report by the Human Rights Campaign and the Center for Countering Digital Hate found that the Twitter accounts of Representative Marjorie Taylor Greene and Representative Lauren Boebert were among the top three sources in the United States for the promotion and propagation of the grooming conspiracy theory. In response, Boebert stated via Twitter "My tweets about groomers are only third? Guess that means I have to tweet about these sick, demented groomers even more".

=== Media involvement ===
In April 2022, the left-leaning media watchdog Media Matters published a study stating that within a three-week period spanning from March 17 to April 6, Fox News ran 170 segments on trans people, throughout which "the network spread dangerous lies about the trans community and repeatedly invoked the long-debunked myth that trans people pose a threat to minors and seek to groom them".

==== The New York Times ====
In June 2022, the New York Times published a front page article titled "The Battle Over Gender Therapy", which reportedly "uncritically platformed gender-critical group Genspect, and the New York Times Magazine's article said the group has held 'web-based seminars that are critical of social and medical transition'", and that "Some parents, who are part of Genspect, told [the author] that they believed the 'rise in trans-identified teenagers was the result of a 'gender cult' – a mass craze'". The Texas Observer described the article as elevating "a handful of outliers and their discredited theories about trans people to prominence they do not enjoy among the medical community" and that "the article echoes right-wing fear-mongering about whether trans kids should be allowed to transition and even suggests their existence could be dangerous to other young people", noting that "the state of Texas is using it as evidence in an ongoing attempt to investigate trans-supportive healthcare as 'child abuse'".

In July 2022, the New York Times published an op-ed falsely attributing the overturning of Roe v. Wade by six conservative Supreme Court justices, to the existence of trans women causing the "erasure" of "women as a biological category". This article was widely circulated, with Representative Rashida Tlaib issuing a statement in response saying that "During escalating assaults on trans people & trans rights nationwide, the New York Times is featuring writers debating whether trans people should even exist and scapegoating this already-marginalized community."

Since then, the New York Times has published several more pieces arguing in favor of restricting access to gender affirming healthcare for trans people, many of which have been widely criticized as "misinformation" by medical experts.

In February 2023, more than 200 NYT contributors signed an open letter expressing "serious concerns about editorial bias in the newspaper's reporting on transgender, non-binary, and gender nonconforming people". The letter characterized the NYT's reporting as using "an eerily familiar mix of pseudoscience and euphemistic, charged language", and raised concerns regarding the NYT's employment practices regarding trans contributors.

=== Grooming accusations ===
Increasing grooming accusations in the United States has been linked to Christopher Rufo, who tweeted in August 2021 about "winning the language war," and James A. Lindsay. Following the Wi Spa controversy in July 2021, Julia Serano noted that there a rise in false accusations of grooming directed towards transgender people, saying that it appeared as if there was a movement to "lay the foundation for just smearing all trans people as child sexual predators." Libs of TikTok (LoTT) also helped popularize the term 'groomer' as a pejorative for LGBT people, supporters of LGBT youth, and those who teach about sexuality. In November 2021 LoTT claimed that the Trevor Project was a "grooming organization" and later in the year claimed that Chasten Buttigieg was "grooming kids."

On February 24, The Heritage Foundation, a Washington, D.C.-based think tank, tweeted that the bill "protects young children from sexual grooming". On March 4, Christina Pushaw, press secretary for Florida Governor Ron DeSantis, referred to the bill as "an anti-grooming bill" and stated via twitter that anyone against it was "probably a groomer".

Since then, numerous right wing pundits began describing the behavior of parents and teachers who want to allow children to express their transgender identity as grooming, and the term "groomer" has become widely used by conservative media and politicians to imply that the LGBTQ community and their allies are pedophiles or pedophile-enablers. Slate magazine later described the word "grooming" as "the buzzword of the season".

In April 2022, the left-leaning media watchdog Media Matters published a study stating that within a three-week period spanning from March 17 to April 6, Fox News ran 170 segments on trans people, throughout which "the network spread dangerous lies about the trans community and repeatedly invoked the long-debunked myth that trans people pose a threat to minors and seek to groom them".

According to a joint report in August 2022 by the American Human Rights Campaign, and the British Center for Countering Digital Hate found that the 500 most influential hateful "grooming" tweets were seen 72 million times, and that "grooming" tweets from just ten influential sources were seen 48 million times. It also found that Meta, formerly known as Facebook, had accepted up to $24,987 for ads pushing the grooming conspiracy theory, which had been served to users over 2.1 million times, and that Twitter – despite saying groomer slurs were a violation of its hate speech policy – failed to act on 99% of tweets reported for such.

== Facilities access ==
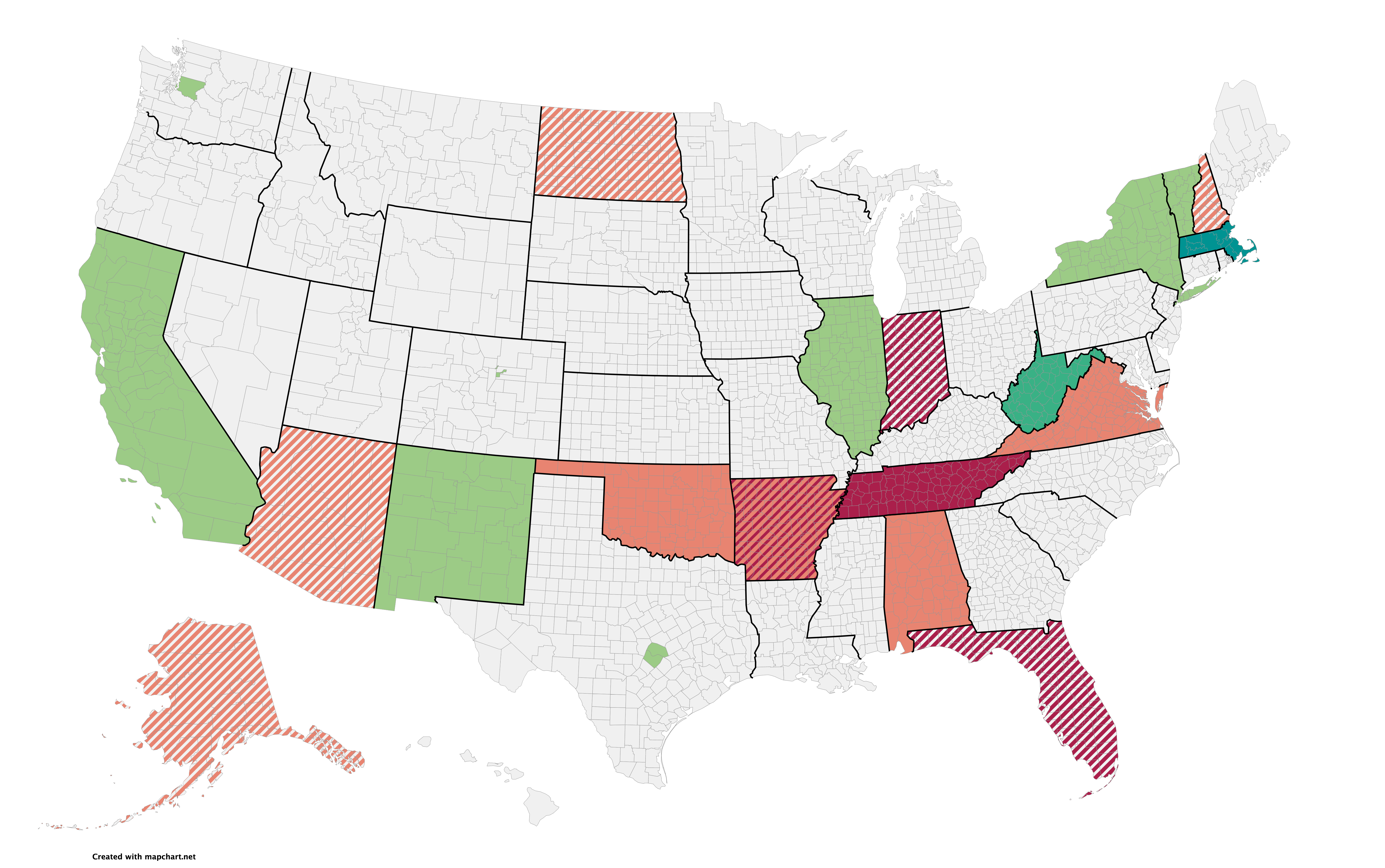
States and counties in the United States which have enacted legislation on restrooms, locker rooms, and other sex-segregated public accommodations, in regard to their access from those who are transgender, or have gender dysphoria as of March 2023: State, city, or county mandates single-user unisex restrooms in all public buildings State explicitly prohibits discrimination in restrooms on the basis of gender identity State legislation or school guidelines currently allow students to use restrooms that correspond with gender identity State legislation or school guidelines currently prohibit students from using restrooms that differ from biological sex Currently considering state legislation or school guidelines that would prohibit students from using restrooms that differ from biological sex State indecent exposure law may be construed to criminalize trans people from undressing in locker rooms or using restrooms that do not match their biological sex Currently considering bills that may criminalize trans people from undressing in locker rooms or using restrooms that do not match their biological sex

An area of legal concern for transgender people is access to restrooms which are segregated by gender. Transgender people have, in the past, been asked for legal identification while entering or using a gendered restroom. Recent legislation has moved in contradictory directions. On one hand, non-discrimination laws have included restrooms as public accommodations, indicating a right to use gendered facilities which conform with a person's gender identity. On the other, some efforts have been made to insist that individuals use restrooms that match their biological sex, regardless of an individual's gender identity or expression.

=== Federal sex-segregated facilities access policy ===
On June 1, 2015, the Occupational Safety and Health Administration (OSHA) issued nonbinding guidance titled A Guide to Restroom Access for Transgender Workers, recommending that all employers, including federal contractors, allow employees to use restrooms consistent with their gender identity. The guidance remains publicly available but has no legal force. On August 18, 2016, the U.S. General Services Administration (GSA) issued GSA Bulletin FMR 2016-B1, formally titled Implementation of Executive Order 13672 – Gender Identity Non-Discrimination in Federal Facilities Managed by GSA and published in the Federal Register under the heading Clarification of Nondiscrimination in the Federal Workplace. The bulletin interpreted the prohibition of sex discrimination under the Federal Management Regulation (FMR) to include gender identity, thereby extending nondiscrimination protections to transgender individuals in GSA-managed facilities—including restrooms, locker rooms, and other sex-segregated spaces—without documentation requirements. The policy applied to both federal employees and members of the public visiting GSA-managed federal buildings.

On January 20, 2021, President Joe Biden signed Executive Order 13988: Preventing and Combating Discrimination on the Basis of Gender Identity or Sexual Orientation, which directed agencies to ensure that access to bathrooms and other sex-segregated facilities in federal buildings was provided based on gender identity, consistent with the Supreme Court's decision in Bostock v. Clayton County (2020). On January 21, 2025, President Donald Trump issued Executive Order 14168: Defending Women from Gender Ideology Extremism and Restoring Biological Truth to the Federal Government, which redefined federal policy to recognize only "biological sex" and directed agencies to remove gender-identity-based access rules from federal facilities.

On April 29, 2024, the Equal Employment Opportunity Commission (EEOC) issued and immediately put into effect its updated Enforcement Guidance on Harassment in the Workplace, which for the first time explicitly stated that gender identity discrimination under Title VII includes denying employees access to restrooms consistent with their gender identity, as well as imposing dress codes or pronoun usage inconsistent with a person's gender identity. The guidance applied to all covered employers, including federal agencies, and was intended to provide interpretive clarity in light of the Supreme Court's decision in Bostock v. Clayton County.

On May 5, 2025, a federal class-action Equal Employment Opportunity complaint titled Withrow v. National Guard, et al. was filed by LeAnne Withrow, a civilian employee of the Illinois National Guard, against the National Guard Bureau, Department of Defense, and Office of Personnel Management. The complaint alleges that enforcement of "biological sex" bathroom rules against transgender federal employees violates Title VII, as interpreted by Bostock v. Clayton County, as well as the Fifth Amendment and the Administrative Procedure Act. On November 20, 2025, the ACLU LeAnne Withrow filed a federal lawsuit, Withrow v. United States, in the U.S. District Court for the District of Columbia. That case is still pending.

On May 9, 2025, GSA formally rescinded Bulletin 2016-B1, ending the explicit requirement for gender-identity–based access to sex-segregated facilities in GSA-managed federal buildings. On May 15, 2025, in the case State of Texas and the Heritage Foundation v. Equal Employment Opportunity Commission (N.D. Tex., No. 2:24-CV-173), a federal district court—Judge Matthew Kacsmaryk—vacated nationwide the portions of the April 2024 EEOC guidance that addressed gender identity, including restroom, dress, and pronoun accommodations, ruling that EEOC had exceeded its statutory authority under Title VII.

On July 10, 2025, the U.S. Office of Personnel Management (OPM) issued updated government-wide guidance to all executive branch agencies to implement Executive Order 14168's redefinition of "sex" as biological. The memo directed agencies to remove gender identity language and related promotional material from all internal and external policies, forms, and communications; to designate all single-sex intimate spaces—explicitly including restrooms, locker rooms, and lactation rooms—based solely on biological sex as defined at birth; and to certify compliance to OPM by August 11, 2025. The guidance applies to all employees of the executive branch and to individuals accessing single-sex facilities within federally controlled workplaces and properties, but does not impose requirements on state or local government facilities outside of federal jurisdiction.

=== Comprehensive legislation ===
Numerous jurisdictions and states have passed or considered so-called "bathroom bills" which restrict the use of bathrooms by transgender people, forcing them to choose facilities in accordance with their biological sex. As of May 2024, Alabama, Arkansas, Florida, Idaho, Iowa, Kansas, Kentucky, Mississippi, North Dakota, Oklahoma, Tennessee and Utah have such laws.

On March 23, 2016, North Carolina passed a comprehensive bathroom restriction bill (the Public Facilities Privacy & Security Act, also known as "HB2"), overriding a prior municipal Charlotte non-discrimination ordinance on the same subject. It was quickly signed into law by Gov. Pat McCrory, but on March 30, 2017, following national controversy, the part of the law related to bathrooms was repealed. According to the ACLU, the partial repeal still allowed discrimination against transgender persons.

In April 2016, objecting to the "bathroom predator myth", a coalition of over 200 U.S. organizations for sexual assault and domestic violence survivors noted that, while "over 200 municipalities and 18 states" had legal protections for transgender people, none of these places had tied an increase in sexual violence to these nondiscrimination laws.

In September 2016, California governor Jerry Brown signed a bill requiring all single-occupancy bathrooms to be gender-neutral, effective since March 1, 2017. California is the first U.S. state to adopt such legislation. Vermont, New Mexico and Illinois have since followed suit in 2019.

On May 2, 2019, Tennessee governor Bill Lee signed into law legislation defining a trans person using the bathroom corresponding with their gender identity as "indecent exposure." The Tennessee Equality Project had complained about the bill's original language, and although that language was altered before it became law, the organization still believed the bill was harmful to trans people.

On April 8, 2022, Alabama Governor Ivey signed a bathroom bill applying to public schools. As of March 2024, she is likely to sign a similar bill applying to universities.

On May 3, 2023, the Florida legislature passed the "Safety in Private Spaces Act", which the governor was expected to sign, making it a second-degree misdemeanor to use a bathroom other than that which is designated for people of one's sex assigned at birth. An earlier attempt in 2015 had failed.

In March 2026, Idaho lawmakers approved legislation that would make it a misdemeanor offense for individuals to use bathrooms or changing rooms that do not correspond to their sex assigned at birth in places of public accommodation, including private businesses or facilities that serve the public.

=== Indecent exposure charges for restroom use ===
In September 2021, following extensive right wing protests, a Los Angeles trans woman was charged by the LAPD with felony indecent exposure after she was recorded using the women's changing room at a local nude spa. The trans woman had two previous convictions for indecent exposure and a conviction for failing to register as a sex offender. The nude spa in question had an explicitly trans-inclusive policy, and mandated nudity in gender segregated areas.

In February 2023, another trans woman was charged with indecent exposure for using the changing room at the YWCA in Xenia, Ohio, despite the facility's policy also being one of support.

=== Schools ===
In Doe v. Regional School Unit, the Maine Supreme Court held that a transgender girl had a right to use the women's bathroom at school because her psychological well-being and educational success depended on her transition. The school, in denying her access, had "treated [her] differently from other students solely because of her status as a transgender girl." The court determined that this was a form of discrimination.

In Mathis v. Fountain-Fort Carson School District 8 (2013), Colorado's Division of Civil Rights found that denying a transgender girl access to the women's restroom at school was discrimination. They reasoned, "By not permitting the [student] to use the restroom with which she identifies, as non-transgender students are permitted to do, the [school] treated the [student] less favorably than other students seeking the same service." Furthermore, the court rejected the school's defense—that the discriminatory policy was implemented to protect the transgender student from harassment—and observed that transgender students are in fact safest when a school does not single them out as different. Based on this finding, it is no longer acceptable to institute different kinds of bathroom rules for transgender and cisgender people.

In May 2016, guidance was issued by the United States Department of Justice and the United States Department of Education stating that schools which receive federal money must treat a student's gender identity as their sex (for example, in regard to bathrooms). However, this policy was revoked in 2017.

In October 2016, the Court agreed to take on the case of whether a transgender boy, Gavin Grimm, could use the boys' bathroom in his Virginia high school. Grimm was assigned female at birth but is a transgender male. For a while, he was permitted access to the boys' bathroom but was later denied access after a new policy was adopted by the local school board. The ACLU took on the case, stating that girls objected when he tried to use the girls' bathroom in accordance with the new policy and that he was humiliated when the school directed him to use a private bathroom, unlike other boys. After challenging the policy, he won his case in the Court of Appeals in 2015 in a tie vote. This marked the first ruling by an appeals court to find that transgender students are protected under federal laws that ban sex-based discrimination. However, later in 2016 the U.S. Supreme Court agreed to put that ruling on hold. Then in 2017 the U.S. Supreme Court vacated the decision of the 4th U.S. Circuit Court of Appeals and refused to hear the case. Later in 2017, it was announced that the 4th Circuit would send the case back to the district court for the judge to determine whether the case was moot because Grimm graduated. The District Court found the case was not moot, and ruled in favor of Grimm, which was later upheld by the Fourth Circuit on appeal in August 2020, using the Supreme Court's recent decision in Bostock v. Clayton County as a basis for their decision.

A similar case had occurred in the public schools of Dallas, Oregon, which had allowed transgender students to use the restrooms and locker rooms of the school based on their gender identity on the basis of the 2016 federal policy. Parents of other students had sued to have the policy overturned, but the policy was upheld at both the United States District Court for the District of Oregon and the United States Court of Appeals for the Ninth Circuit. The Supreme Court denied to hear the challenge to the Ninth Circuit in November 2020, leaving that decision in place.

=== Workplace ===
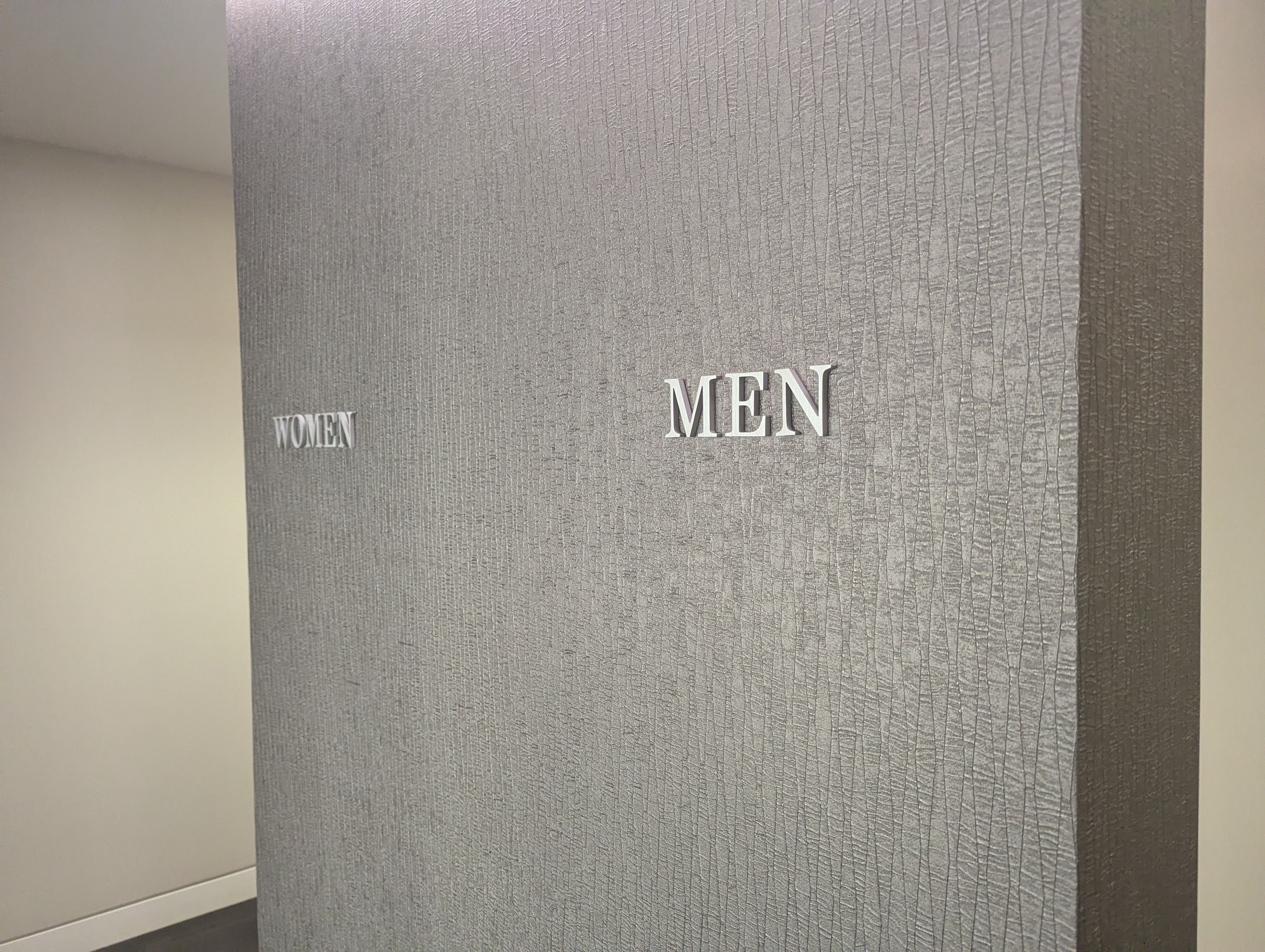
Bathroom signs for men and women at the Heritage Foundation

Rights to restrooms that match one's gender identity have also been recognized in the workplace and are actively being asserted in public accommodations. In Iowa, for example, discrimination in public accommodations on the basis of sexual orientation and gender identity has been prohibited by law since 2007 through the Iowa Civil Rights Act.

In Cruzan v. Special School District #1, decided in 2002, a Minnesota federal appeals court ruled that it is not the job of the transgender person to accommodate the concerns of cisgender people who express discomfort with sharing a facility with a transgender person. Employers need to offer an alternative to the complaining employee in these situations, such as an individual restroom.

Equal Employment Opportunity Commission (EEOC) chair Charlotte A. Burrows issued guidelines in 2021 stating that "employers may not deny an employee equal access to a bathroom, locker room, or shower that corresponds to the employee's gender identity."

== Hate crimes legislation ==
US state hate crime laws as they pertain to gender identity as of June 2020 Gender identity recognized in state hate crimes law No enumerated protection Anti-Defamation League, June 2006. Retrieved May 4, 2007

Federal hate crimes legislation include limited protections for gender identity. The Matthew Shepard and James Byrd, Jr. Hate Crimes Prevention Act of 2009 criminalized "willfully causing bodily injury (or attempting to do so with fire, firearm, or other dangerous weapon)" on the basis of an "actual or perceived" identity. However, protections for hate crimes motivated on the basis of a victim's gender identity or sexual orientation is limited to "crime affect[ing] interstate or foreign commerce or occur[ring] within federal special maritime and territorial jurisdiction." This limitation only applies to gender identity and sexual orientation, and not to race, color, religion or national origin. Therefore, hate crimes which occur outside these jurisdictions are not protected by federal law.

22 states plus Washington D.C. have hate crimes legislation which includes gender identity or expression as a protected group. They are Vermont, Massachusetts, Connecticut, New Jersey, Delaware, Illinois, Maryland, Missouri, Minnesota, Colorado, New Mexico, Nevada, Rhode Island, Washington, Oregon, California, Hawaii, Maine, Tennessee, Puerto Rico, Utah, Virginia and New York. Twenty-seven states have hate-crimes legislation which exclude transgender people. Six states have no hate-crimes legislation at all.

Numerous municipalities have passed hate-crime legislation, some of which include transgender people. However Arkansas, North Carolina and Tennessee recently passed laws which ban municipalities from enacting such protections for sexual orientation, gender identity or expression.

== Healthcare ==
Transgender people confront two major legal issues within the healthcare system: access to health care for gender transitioning and discrimination by health care workers.

=== Treatment for adults ===
Many Republican legislators across the country are increasingly proposing legislation to restrict gender-affirming care for adults or make such care harder to access. However, no states have outright banned gender-affirming care for adults. Efforts to restrict adults' access to healthcare relies heavily on claims from self-described "gender-critical" organizations such as Genspect that young people should not be recognized as adults until they turn 25.

As of January 2024, seven states limit access to gender-affirming care for adults without banning it, such as allowing private health plans, Medicaid, and correctional facilities to exclude all coverage for gender-affirming care, prohibiting the use of federal funds for gender-affirming care or requiring special informed consent practices.

In January 2024, in a conversation about trans healthcare with several Republican legislators, Michigan State Rep. Josh Schriver asked, "If we are going to stop this for anyone under 18, why not apply it for anyone over 18? It's harmful across the board and that's something we need to take into consideration in terms of the endgame." Michigan State Rep. Brad Paquette and Ohio State Rep. Gary Click expressed agreement with that sentiment.

In December 2024, Tennessee Senator, Bo Watson said that, although banning gender-affirming care for adults may not currently be of interest to the Tennessee legislature, he would not rule out a ban in the future.

In 2025, Texas Representative, Brent Money introduced a bill in the Texas House of Representatives that would ban gender affirming care for transgender individuals of all ages.

In July 2025, Puerto Rico became the first place in the United States to pass a ban on gender-affirming care for people over 18, banning it for anyone under 21 years of age. Puerto Rico's LGBTQ+ Federation immediately announced plans to challenge the ban in court.

These states make it easy for trans adults to sue their doctors:

- Utah: In January 2023, Utah stripped liability protections from any doctor who treats a trans person under the age of 25, and allowed any trans person under 25 to retroactively "disaffirm" consent and sue the doctor for providing care they previously consented to.
- South Dakota: In February 2023, South Dakota passed a law stating that any civil action to recover damages for injury suffered as a result of gender-affirming care performed on a minor must be commenced before the date on which the person reaches age 25.
- Arkansas: On March 13, 2023, Governor Sarah Huckabee Sanders signed a bill giving adults 15 years to file malpractice lawsuits for gender-affirming care they received as minors, whereas for other types of care (under preexisting law) a malpractice lawsuit must generally be filed within two years.

These states restrict treatment for trans adults (as well as younger people):

- Florida: In August 2022, the state medical board voted to consider new standards in response to the Florida Department of Health issuing debunked guidance on gender-affirming healthcare, including false claims that it represents "experimental" treatments that lack scientific support. On May 17, 2023, DeSantis signed a law banning insurance providers from covering gender-affirming care for adults, as well as banning nurse practitioners and physicians' assistants (estimated to make up 80% of gender affirming care providers) from administering it, and banning it from being offered via telehealth. The Florida state legislature had passed the bill the previous month. In June 2024, a judge permanently blocked the law from taking effect. In August 2024, the 11th Circuit Court of Appeals stayed the permanent injunction while the matter is appealed.
- Missouri: In April 2023, the state attorney general issued an emergency order instituting a three-year waiting period of continuous documented dysphoria before qualifying for gender-affirming care, disqualifying people if they have untreated depression or anxiety, mandating screening for autism, and mandating periodic screenings for "social contagion". This has been characterized by many as a de facto ban on trans healthcare for adults, since depression and anxiety are common symptoms of gender dysphoria. A judge temporarily blocked enforcement of the order and scheduled a hearing for May 11. The attorney general withdrew this order on May 16 after the state legislature passed two bills restricting gender-affirming care for trans youth. On June 7, 2023, Governor Mike Parson signed a bill that contained a provision banning gender-affirming care for prisoners, which took effect on August 28.
- Puerto Rico: In July, 2025, Puerto Rico implemented a ban on gender affirming care for anyone under 21 years of age. Puerto Rico's LGBTQ+ Federation immediately announced plans to challenge the ban in court.

In August 2025, the Office of Personnel Management (OPM) stated in an internal memo that beginning in 2026, gender-affirming care would no longer be covered by the Federal Employees Health Benefits and Postal Service Health Benefits programs. On January 1, 2026, the Human Rights Campaign (HRC) filed a class action complaint with the Equal Employment Opportunity Commission (EEOC) in response to the OPM policy change.

In a March 2026 ruling from the Fourth Circuit, a three judge panel found for states like West Virginia that had passed laws that removed adult gender-affirming care coverage from Medicaid financial support. The ruling relied heavily on the Supreme Court's decision in Skrmetti, which ruled that bans on genders affirming care for minors were constitutional. The Fourth Circuit wrote that states may restrict such care to adults to "encourage citizens to appreciate their sex".

=== Treatment for minors ===
Each state may pass its own laws about gender-affirming care for minors. The U.S. Supreme Court decided this on June 18, 2025, in United States v. Skrmetti, ruling that such bans do not classify by sex and thus do not require intermediate scrutiny according to the 14th Amendment's Equal Protection Clause.

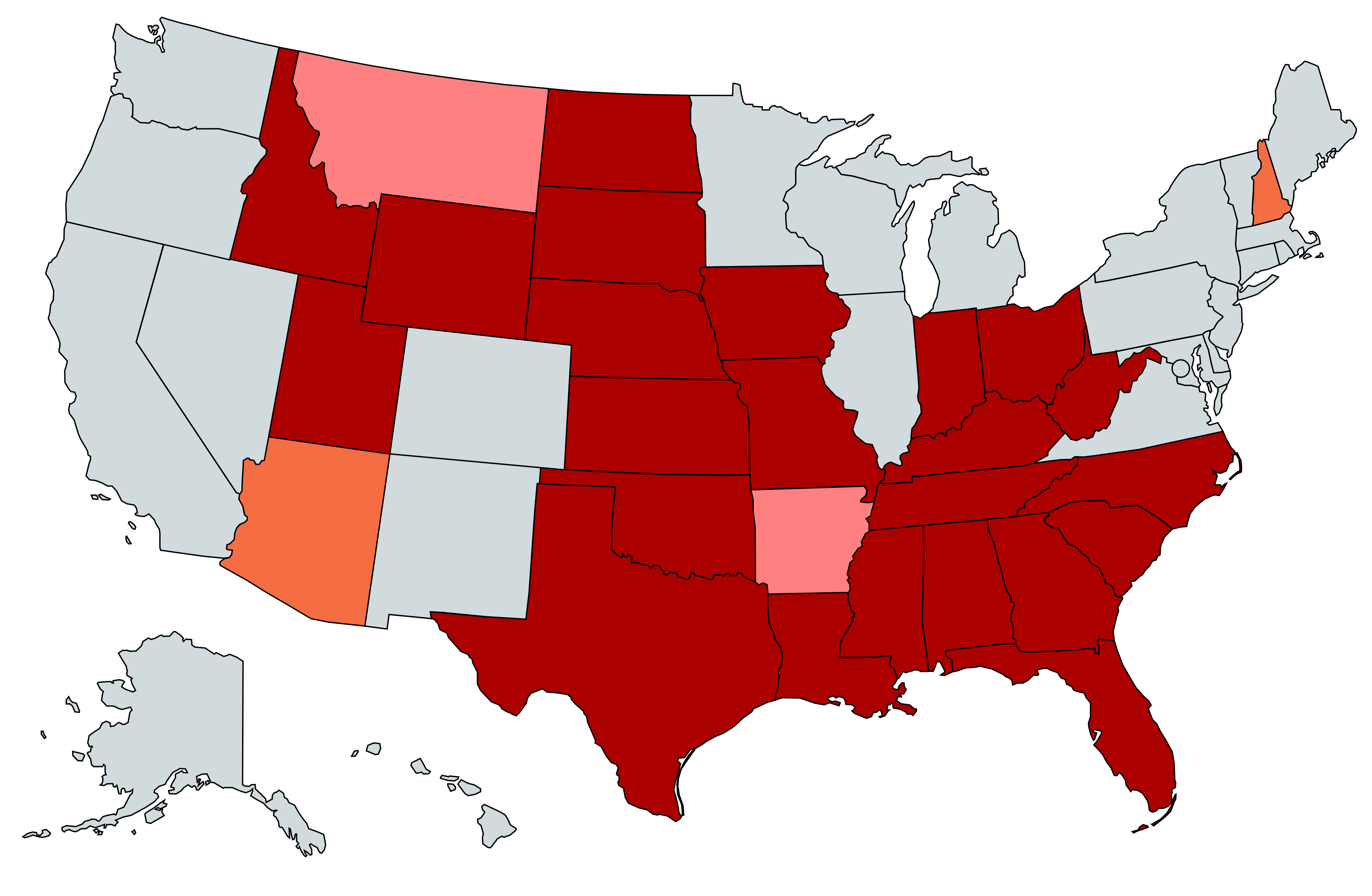
US state laws that ban gender-affirming care for transgender people as of June 2025 Law that restricts gender-affirming care for transgender minors Law that restricts only gender-affirming surgery for transgender minors Law restricting access to gender-affirming care that is unenforceable due to court injunction

Five months before the outcome of U.S. v. Skrmetti, President Donald Trump signed an executive order in an effort to federally prevent gender-affirming care for all people under 19 years old. The order revokes federal funding for any institutions providing such care and directs federal agencies to take further steps. Multiple states sued, and a federal judge, Brendan A. Hurson, blocked the order from taking effect while the PFLAG v. Trump lawsuit is ongoing.

Gender-affirming care for minors has a long history in the United States and is supported by major medical associations. Efforts to prohibit gender-affirming care for minors began in the 2010s, but did not immediately receive much attention from state legislatures. The conservative organization Do No Harm was influential in developing model legislation that appeared starting in 2022 in Arkansas, Florida, Iowa, Mississippi, Montana, New Hampshire, and West Virginia legislatures. In 2023, 19 bans were enacted, 16 of which were being challenged in court as of January 2024.

In February 2024, the American Psychological Association approved a policy statement supporting unobstructed access to health care and evidence-based clinical care for transgender, gender-diverse, and nonbinary children, adolescents, and adults, as well as opposing state bans and policies intended to limit access to such care.

As of August 2025, 27 states had enacted some form of ban on gender-affirming care for minors. Of those, 21 have complete bans in effect, four have partial bans, and two passed bans that are currently blocked from taking effect. While some states have banned all forms of medical transition, others such as Arizona, Nebraska and Georgia have banned only specific types such as hormone therapy or surgery. Seven states have exceptions which allow minors who were already receiving gender-affirming care prior to the ban to continue their treatments. Currently, all 27 states make exceptions for puberty blockers, hormones and surgery for cisgender and intersex children. There is only one state, Missouri, that has a ban which is set to expire after a certain period of time. Nearly all states with restrictions include specific provisions with penalties for providers and 4 states include provisions directed at parents or guardians. An additional 4 states include laws/policies that impact school officials such as teachers and counselors, among others.

At the same time, many Democrat-controlled states have gone in the opposite direction and enacted laws protecting access to gender affirming care for minors and adults. These laws, often called "shield" laws, often explicitly combine protections for gender-affirming care and abortion and cover a variety of protections including protecting both providers and patients from being punished, mandating insurance providers to cover the procedures and acting as "sanctuary states" that protect patients traveling to the state from other states that have banned such treatments among other things. As of June 2026, 18 states and the District of Columbia have enacted "shield" laws.

Of the approximately 1.6 million Americans who are transgender, about 300,000 are under the age of 18. As of October 2023, approximately 105,200 transgender youth aged 13 to 17 lived in states where gender affirming care is banned for minors. However, around 26,000 of those youth are currently still able to access care in their state due to court orders that prohibit enforcement of the laws. Conversely, around 146,700 transgender youth live in states that have passed gender-affirming care "shield" laws that support access to care by protecting doctors and parents who prescribe or seek access to medical care for youth. An analysis from KFF in late January 2024 estimated that 38% of trans youth between the ages of 13–17 in the United States lived in states with laws limiting youth access to gender-affirming care.

Bans on gender-affirming care have been criticized as governments interfering with the patient-doctor relationship and taking away healthcare decisions from parents and families for their children. State level bans on gender-affirming care in the United States have led some families with transgender children to move out of their states.

In May 2024, the Department of Justice indicted a Texas doctor, Eithan Haim, for alleged HIPAA violations involving Texas Children's Hospital which he claimed was secretly providing gender-affirming care to minors. In January 2025, the Trump administration dropped the charges and the case was dismissed with prejudice.

In October 2024, Texas Attorney General Ken Paxton filed suit against a doctor who allegedly provided gender-affirming care to 21 minors after it had been banned for minors in the state, the first time that such a suit has been brought in the U.S.

On December 17, 2025, the House voted on H.R. 3492, the "Protect Children's Innocence Act", a bill sponsored by Marjorie Taylor Greene that would make providing gender-affirming care to minors a Class C felony. The bill passed 216-211. The next day, the Department of Health and Human Services (HHS) announced its intent to impose a rule prohibiting hospitals from offering gender-affirming care to minors, as a condition of federal Medicare and Medicaid funding. The HHS utilized the euphemism "sex-rejecting procedures" to refer to the practice.

On December 23, 2025, nineteen states and Washington D.C. joined a lawsuit against the HHS in response to its proposed ban on gender-affirming care for minors.

As of the early 2020s, providing gender-affirming healthcare to trans minors is considered best practice by the American Medical Association (AMA), American Psychiatric Association, the Endocrine Society, American Academy of Pediatrics, and the World Professional Association for Transgender Health.

In 2025, the AMA rejected the Trump administration HHS gender dysphoria report, which saying that its claims are "rooted in politics and partisanship, misrepresent the consensus of medical science, undermine the professionalism of physicians, and risk harming vulnerable young people and their families". The report was written in compliance with Executive Order 14187, which made it illegal for the federal government to advocate in favor of gender-affirming care under the age of 19. The report contradicted the consensus of the mainstream medical community, instead advocating for conversion therapy as the primary means of treatment for transgender youth.

On February 4, 2026, a day after the American Society of Plastic Surgeons (ASPS) heavily cited the Trump report to advocate against gender affirming surgeries under the age of 19, news outlets reported that the AMA had agreed with the ASPS. However, AMA's board released a statement claiming the media was misrepresenting what they had told them. The AMA board claimed that they never said they agreed with the ASPS statement nor had they changed their position on gender-affirming care. They said that they still support gender-affirming care as "medically necessary" and that their "recent response to questions about ASPS's position statement was intended to preserve—not diminish—access to gender-affirming care". Additionally, the AMA board said that they had sent letters to news outlets like the New York Times asking them to correct their stories which mischaracterized their statement.

On February 5, 2026, an AMA spokesperson reaffirmed the organization's support for puberty blockers for trans youth and said their position on puberty blockers had not changed, nor did they have any plans to change it.

The AMA continues to oppose restrictions on gender-affirming care for trans youth. On February 17, 2026, the AMA sent letters opposing two proposed CMS rules that would restrict doctors and hospitals from providing gender-affirming care to minors, saying the rules "interfere with the practice of medicine and undermine the physician-patient relationship" and requesting that the rules be withdrawn.

At their annual meeting in summer 2026, the American Medical Association's House of Delegates passed a new policy formally and explicitly supporting gender-affirming care for minors, including surgeries.

In March, it was revealed that representatives for the ASPS and several other medical organizations had met with Dr. Mehmet Oz, a member of the Trump administration who vehemently opposes gender-affirming care prior to the release of their new statement. During the meeting, Dr. Oz attempted to pressure the organizations to abandon their support for gender-affirming care. The Society for Evidence-Based Gender Medicine (SEGM), an SPLC-designated hate group was also present at the meeting and Kathleen McDeavitt, one of the co-authors of the HHS report, also gave a presentation at the meeting. This led to speculation and accusations that the ASPS statement opposing surgeries for minors may have been influenced by the Trump administration, although the ASPS denies this.

In May 2026, Texas Attorney General Ken Paxton announced a settlement with Texas Children's Hospital requiring the hospital to establish a "detransition clinic" for minors who had received gender-transition related medical treatment, and to pay $10 million over alleged Medicaid billing practices connected to transgender care for minors. LGBTQ advocacy groups criticized the settlement.

==== Bans for minors ====
Laws which are currently unenforceable due to a court injunction
Laws which only partially ban gender affirming care for minors

Bans of gender-affirming healthcare for people under 18
| State | Authority | Signed | Effective | Notes |
|---|---|---|---|---|
| Arkansas | State legislature | April 6, 2021 | | On April 6, 2021, the legislature—overriding Governor Asa Hutchinson's veto on a bill that banned puberty blockers, hormones, and surgery for minors and from referring them to other providers. However, a federal district court temporarily and then permanently blocked the law. On August 12, 2025, the U.S. Court of Appeals for the Eighth Circuit reversed the permanent ban, allowing the law to be enforced. |
| Texas | Texas AG Ken Paxton Governor Greg Abbott | February 22, 2022 June 2, 2023 | Blocked by injunction (order) September 1, 2023 (legislation) | In February 2022, the state Attorney General ordered a ban on gender-affirming care for trans youth, with criminal penalties for failing to report suspected violations. However, the order is currently blocked by injunction. In June 2023, the governor signed a law to ban this care for minors. On August 25, 2023, a district court judge blocked the law from taking effect. In response, the Attorney General's office filed an appeal with the Texas Supreme Court, a move that automatically pauses the judge's injunction and allowed the law to go into effect on September 1, 2023, as originally planned. On June 28, 2024, the Texas Supreme Court upheld the law. |
| Alabama | Governor Kay Ivey | April 8, 2022 | May 8, 2022 | It is a felony for a medical provider to give gender-affirming healthcare to transgender people under 19 (the age of majority in Alabama). In May 2022, a federal judge ruled that the ban on surgery was enforceable. However, the ban on puberty blockers and hormones was not enforceable while the law is challenged in court. In August 2023, the 11th U.S. Circuit Court of Appeals reversed the decision, allowing the ban on puberty blockers and hormones to take effect. |
| Utah | Governor Spencer Cox | January 27, 2023 | | |
| South Dakota | Governor Kristi Noem | February 13, 2023 | | |
| Mississippi | Governor Tate Reeves | February 28, 2023 | | |
| Tennessee | Governor Bill Lee | March 2, 2023 | | |
| Florida | Florida Board of Medicine Governor Ron DeSantis | | August 26, 2024 (legislation) Blocked (state board of medicine rule) | The state board of medicine rule took effect on March 16, 2023. Additionally, on May 17, 2023, Governor DeSantis signed a ban into law, and it took effect immediately. It applies only to new patients, not those who were already receiving gender-affirming care. However, on June 6, 2023, a court temporarily blocked enforcement of both the board rule and the law. In June 2024, a judge permanently blocked the law from taking effect. In August 2024, the 11th Circuit Court of Appeals stayed the permanent injunction while the matter is appealed. |
| Iowa | Governor Kim Reynolds | March 22, 2023 | | |
| Georgia | Governor Brian Kemp | March 23, 2023 | July 1, 2023 | Bans hormones and surgery while continuing to allow puberty blockers. Minors who began hormones prior to July 1, 2023 are allowed to continue treatment. |
| West Virginia | Governor Jim Justice | March 29, 2023 | May 7, 2025 | The bill made exceptions for minors who have received parental consent and are diagnosed with "severe gender dysphoria" by two doctors. Due to this exception, experts did not expect the ban to have much of an impact. In May 2025, Governor Patrick Morrisey signed a bill ending this exception. |
| Kentucky | State legislature | March 29, 2023 | July 14, 2023 | The legislature overrode Governor Andy Beshear's veto, banning gender-affirming healthcare for trans minors. Federal appeals judges allowed the ban to remain in effect during legal challenges to overturn it. |
| Arizona | Governor Doug Ducey | March 30, 2022 | March 31, 2023 | Bans gender-affirming surgery for minors, but not hormones and puberty blockers. The bill also makes some exceptions, including in the case of someone born intersex. In mid 2023, a new governor, Katie Hobbs reversed course by signing a series of executive orders which include shield-style protections for gender-affirming care, ensuring that it remains legal in Arizona. It also bans conversion therapy, requires insurance plans to cover gender-affirming care and bars state agencies from cooperating with civil and criminal cases in states where gender-affirming health care is illegal. |
| Idaho | Governor Brad Little | April 4, 2023 | April 15, 2024 | It would also make it a felony for any medical practitioner to help a minor seek gender-affirming treatment. On December 27, 2023, a federal judge blocked the law from taking effect. On April 15, 2024, the US Supreme Court responded to an emergency request filed in February by temporarily allowing the ban to go into effect while further legal challenges to it play out in the lower courts. The ruling did not resolve the underlying legal challenges raised by the case nor did the justices rule on the larger issue of bans on gender-affirming treatment for minors. The ruling also does not apply to the two plaintiffs in the lawsuit. |
| Indiana | Governor Eric Holcomb | April 5, 2023 | February 27, 2024 | On June 16, 2023, a federal judge temporarily blocked the law from taking effect. On February 27, 2024, the 7th Circuit Court of Appeals reversed the decision allowing the ban to take effect. |
| North Dakota | Governor Doug Burgum | April 20, 2023 | | On April 20, 2023, North Dakota Governor Doug Burgum signed a law criminalizing trans health care for minors. However, the law notably makes exceptions for medication treatment for "rare circumstances with parental consent". The law also allows medication treatment for early onset puberty and minors who were already receiving gender-affirming care will still be able to receive treatment. |
| Montana | Governor Greg Gianforte | April 28, 2023 | Blocked | On September 27, 2023, a Montana District Court judge prevented it from taking effect. On December 11, 2024, the Montana Supreme Court upheld the ban and suggested the ban is likely unconstitutional and sent it back to the district court for trial. If the ban does take effect, some treatments would remain legal for minors who are not suffering from gender dysphoria. |
| North Carolina | State legislature | | August 17, 2023 | Ban on gender-affirming care, such as hormones, puberty blockers, and surgery, for minors. The ban only applies to transgender children and still allows such treatments for intersex and cisgender children. The ban also only applies to new patients. Transgender children who started treatment prior to August 1, 2023 will be allowed to continue receiving treatment. Governor Roy Cooper vetoed the bill on July 5, 2023, but the state legislature overruled his veto on August 17, therefore making the bill law. |
| Missouri | Governor Mike Parson | June 7, 2023 | August 28, 2023 | People receiving puberty blockers or hormones before the ban went into effect may continue taking them. Otherwise, blockers and hormones are banned until 2027. Surgery is also banned. A 2024 lawsuit by the ACLU was unsuccessful. |
| Louisiana | State Legislature | | January 1, 2024 | On June 29, 2023, John Bel Edwards vetoed a ban on blockers, hormones, and surgery for minors. On July 18, the Louisiana State Legislature overrode his veto. |
| Oklahoma | Governor Kevin Stitt | May 1, 2023 | | On May 1, 2023, Governor Kevin Stitt signed a bill that makes it a felony for doctors to provide gender-transition medical care for anyone under the age of 18. In October 2023, a judge declined to stop the law from taking effect. |
| Nebraska | Governor Jim Pillen | October 2, 2023 | October 2, 2023 | On October 2, 2023, the state Department of Health and Human Services announced that Republican Governor Jim Pillen had approved emergency regulations banning gender affirming surgeries for minors. Puberty blockers and hormone treatments for minors still remain legal, however applicants must now wait seven days and undergo at least 40 hours of "clinically neutral" therapy before starting them. The new regulations went into effect immediately. |
| Ohio | State legislature | | April 30, 2025 | On January 5, 2024, Governor Mike DeWine signed an executive order banning gender-affirming surgeries for minors. Previously, on December 29, 2023, he had vetoed the Saving Adolescents from Experimentation (SAFE) Act (HB68) passed (mostly along party lines) by the Ohio Legislature on December 13 which banned gender-affirming surgeries as well as hormones and puberty blockers for minors. The bill includes exceptions for this kind of care for non-transgender youth, and it allows children who were already receiving gender-affirming care in Ohio to continue their treatment. On January 24, 2024, the legislature overrode DeWine's veto thereby making HB68 law. On April 16, 2024, a judge temporarily blocked the ban from taking effect. On August 6, 2024, a judge overturned the injunction and allowed the law to take effect immediately. On March 18, 2025, the state's 10th District Court of Appeals reversed the judge's decision and reinstated the injunction. On April 30, 2025, the Supreme Court of Ohio ruled 4–3 that the ban could take effect while further court battles play out. |
| Wyoming | Governor Mark Gordon | March 22, 2024 | July 1, 2024 | On March 22, 2024, Wyoming Governor Mark Gordon signed a law criminalizing trans health care for minors. |
| South Carolina | Governor Henry McMaster | May 21, 2024 | May 21, 2024 | On May 21, 2024, South Carolina Governor Henry McMaster signed a law banning trans health care for minors. The law, which went into effect immediately, also requires principals, teachers and other school staff members to tell parents when their children want to use a name other than their legal one, or pronouns that do not match their sex assigned at birth. It also bars adults under 26 from using Medicaid to cover the costs for trans health care. This part of the bill is in direct opposition to a 4th U.S. Circuit Court of Appeals ruling from the month prior which ruled that state Medicaid bans on gender-affirming care in the 4th Circuit, which includes South Carolina, are unconstitutional. |
| New Hampshire | Governor Chris Sununu (genital surgeries) Governor Kelly Ayotte (puberty blockers, hormones and other surgeries) | July 19, 2024 (genital surgeries) August 1, 2025 (puberty blockers, hormones and other surgeries) | January 1, 2025 (genital surgeries) January 1, 2026 (puberty blockers, hormones and other surgeries) | On July 19, 2024, New Hampshire Governor Chris Sununu signed a law banning gender-affirming genital surgeries for minors. However, puberty blockers, hormones and non-genital surgeries such as mastectomies remained legal for trans youth. On August 1, 2025, Governor Kelly Ayotte signed a bill ending puberty blockers, hormones and non-genital surgeries for minors in the state too. However, the bill contains an exception which allows minors already receiving care to continue it. |
| Kansas | State legislature | | Blocked | On February 18, 2025, the Kansas state legislature overrode Governor Laura Kelly's veto of Senate Bill 63 which bans gender-affirming care for minors. Children already receiving gender-affirming care in Kansas must stop receiving it by December 31, 2025. On May 17, 2026, Kansas judge issued a temporary injunction against the ban, saying it likely violates the state constitution. |
| Puerto Rico | Governor Jenniffer González-Colón | July 17, 2025 | July 17, 2025 | On July 17, 2025, Puerto Rico Governor Jenniffer González-Colón signed Senate Bill 350 which bans on gender-affirming care for anyone under 21 years of age. It also bars public funding for gender-affirming care and threatens doctors who violate the ban with up to 15 years in prison, a $50,000 fine, and the permanent loss of their licenses. Puerto Rico's LGBTQ+ Federation immediately announced plans to challenge the ban in court. |

===== Related scholarship =====
Some legal scholars have argued that bans on gender-affirming care for minors may fail to satisfy rational basis review due to internal inconsistencies in the regulation of medical interventions on sex characteristics. Katri and Sudai contend that such laws prohibit treatments for transgender minors while permitting comparable or more invasive interventions on intersex children, thereby undermining the coherence of the asserted state interests and calling into question their rationality.

==== Protections for minors ====
"Shield" laws protecting access to gender-affirming healthcare for people under 18
| State | Authority | Signed | Effective | Notes |
|---|---|---|---|---|
| Connecticut | Governor Ned Lamont | May 5, 2022 | May 5, 2022 | On May 5, 2022, Governor Ned Lamont signed House Bill 5414, a shield law that designates Connecticut as a "safe harbor" which protects people who provide abortions and gender affirming care in the state, as well as legal protections for people seeking abortions and gender-affirming health care from out-of-state. |
| Massachusetts | Governor Charlie Baker | July 29, 2022 | July 29, 2022 | On July 29, 2022, Governor Charlie Baker signed a shield law which protects access to abortion and gender-affirming health care in the state. |
| California | Governor Gavin Newsom | September 30, 2022 | January 1, 2023 | On September 30, 2022, Governor Gavin Newsom signed SB 107, a shield law which designates California as a "sanctuary state" for trans youth and their families who are fleeing from other states that have banned the practice. |
| District of Columbia | Mayor Muriel Bowser | November 21, 2022 | November 21, 2022 | On November 21, 2022, Mayor Muriel Bowser signed into law D.C. ACT 24-646, the Human Rights Sanctuary Amendment Act of 2022, which protects the right to bodily autonomy and of those seeking care for abortion, contraception, sexual conduct, intimate relationships, and gender affirmation. |
| Illinois | Governor JB Pritzker | January 13, 2023 | January 13, 2023 | On January 13, 2023, Governor JB Pritzker signed into law HB4664, a reproductive rights and gender affirming care omnibus bill that protects health care providers and their patients from legal attacks by neighboring states and expands reproductive and gender affirming health care access and options across the state. The bill takes historic action to protect Illinois providers and their patients, thousands of whom have traveled to Illinois to access essential care now banned in their home states. |
| New Mexico | Governor Michelle Lujan Grisham | March 16, 2023 | March 16, 2023 | On March 16, 2023, Governor Michelle Lujan Grisham signed into law House Bill 7, the Reproductive and Gender-Affirming Health Care Act, which prohibits public bodies, including local municipalities, from denying, restricting, or discriminating against an individual's right to use or refuse reproductive health care or health care related to gender. |
| Vermont | Governor Phil Scott | March 29, 2023 | September 2023 | On March 29, 2023, Governor Phil Scott signed into law House Bill 89 and Senate Bill 37, which establish a slate of protections for both providers and seekers of gender affirming health care, as well as those seeking or administering abortions. |
| New Jersey | Governor Phil Murphy | April 4, 2023 | April 4, 2023 | On April 4, 2023, Governor Phil Murphy signed Executive Order No. 326 establishing New Jersey as a safe haven for gender-affirming health care by directing all state departments and agencies to protect all persons, including health care professionals and patients, against potential repercussions resulting from providing, receiving, assisting in providing or receiving, seeking, or traveling to New Jersey to obtain gender-affirming health care services. |
| Colorado | Governor Jared Polis | April 14, 2023 | April 14, 2023 | On April 14, 2023, Governor Jared Polis signed into law a trio of health care bills enshrining access to abortion and gender-affirming procedures and medications in Colorado. These bills ensure people in surrounding states and beyond can go to Colorado to have an abortion, begin puberty blockers or receive gender-affirming surgery without fear of prosecution. |
| Minnesota | Governor Tim Walz | April 27, 2023 | April 27, 2023 | On April 27, 2023, Governor Tim Walz signed a shield law protecting minors fleeing from other states to receive gender-affirming care. It also amends child custody and child welfare provisions related to out-of-state laws interfering in the use of gender-affirming health care; amending provisions related to warrants, arrests, and extraditions related to out-of-state laws on gender-affirming health care. It also rules that a court order for the removal of a child issued in another state because the child's parent or guardian assisted the child in receiving gender-affirming care in this state must not be enforced in this state. In addition, it rules that a law of another state that authorizes a state agency to remove a child from the child's parent or guardian because the parent or guardian allowed the child to receive gender-affirming health care is against the public policy of this state and must not be enforced or applied in a case pending in a court in this state. |
| Washington | Governor Jay Inslee | May 9, 2023 | May 9, 2023 | On May 9, 2023, Governor Jay Inslee signed a shield law designating Washington as a "sanctuary state" for trans youth. |
| Maryland | Governor Wes Moore | June 6, 2023 | June 6, 2023 | On June 6, 2023, Governor Wes Moore signed an executive order to protect gender affirming health care in Maryland. The order will protect those seeking, receiving, or providing gender affirming care in Maryland from attempts at legal punishment by other states. |
| New York | Governor Kathy Hochul | June 26, 2023 | June 26, 2023 | On June 26, 2023, Governor Kathy Hochul signed a shield law designating New York as a "sanctuary state" for trans youth. This law protects access to transition-related medical care for transgender minors and bars state courts from enforcing the laws of other states that might authorize a child to be taken away if the parents provide gender-affirming medical care, including puberty blockers and hormone therapy. It also prohibits New York courts from considering transition-related care for minors as child abuse and bars state and local authorities from cooperating with out-of-state agencies regarding the provision of lawful gender-affirming care in New York. |
| Arizona | Governor Katie Hobbs | June 28, 2023 | June 28, 2023 | On March 30, 2022, Governor Doug Ducey signed a bill banning gender-affirming surgery for minors, but not hormones and puberty blockers. The bill also makes some exceptions, including in the case of someone born intersex. On June 28, 2023, a new governor, Katie Hobbs reversed course by signing a series of executive orders which include shield-style protections for gender-affirming care, ensuring that it remains legal in Arizona. It also bans conversion therapy, requires insurance plans to cover gender-affirming care and bars state agencies from cooperating with civil and criminal cases in states where gender-affirming health care is illegal. |
| Oregon | Governor Tina Kotek | July 13, 2023 | July 13, 2023 | On May 9, 2023, Governor Tina Kotek signed a law protecting access to abortion and gender affirming care for trans youth. Minors between the ages of 15 and 17 can receive gender affirming care without parental permission, whereas youth ages 14 and under must have parental permission. |
| Maine | Governor Janet Mills | April 23, 2024 | April 23, 2024 | On April 23, 2024, Governor Janet Mills signed a shield law designating Maine as a "sanctuary state" for gender-affirming care and abortion providers and makes access to such treatments "legal rights" in Maine. It states that criminal and civil actions against providers and patients are not enforceable if the access to that care occurred in Maine. Additionally, the bill prevents cooperation with out-of-state arrest warrants for gender-affirming care and abortion that happen within the state. It also protects doctors who provide gender-affirming care and abortion from actions by medical boards, malpractice insurance, and other regulating entities that seek to economically harm them or dissuade them from providing care. The bill also explicitly enshrines WPATH's Standards of Care into state law for the coverage of transgender healthcare. |
| Rhode Island | Governor Daniel McKee | June 25, 2024 | June 25, 2024 | On June 25, 2024, Governor Daniel McKee signed a shield law designating Rhode Island as a "sanctuary state" for gender-affirming care and abortion providers and makes access to such treatments "legal rights" in Rhode Island. The bill also protects providers from being sued for providing care. |
| Delaware | Governor Matt Meyer | June 20, 2025 | June 20, 2025 | On June 20, 2025, Governor Matt Meyer signed Executive Order No. 11 establishing Delaware as a "sanctuary state" for gender-affirming care by protecting patients and providers from bans and restrictions in other states. It also forbids state agencies from giving up "medical records, data or billing information, or utilize state resources that could help any criminal or civil investigation against someone receiving or providing gender-affirming care" and prohibits the state professional regulations board from disbarring healthcare providers because they provide gender-affirming care. |
| Hawaii | Governor Josh Green | May 29, 2026 | July 1, 2026 | On May 29, 2026, Governor Josh Green signed House Bill 1875, also known as Act 059, a shield law to explicitly protect providers of gender-affirming care and the patients that receive it. The bill also contains protections against "abusive litigation", bans medical malpractice insurers and health carriers from taking adverse actions against gender-affirming care providers, and clarifies permitted disclosures of protected healthcare information in response to new federal regulations. |

==== Related studies ====
In one 2016 study, the effect of puberty blockers was shown to be fully reversible. Earlier studies (e.g., these in 2012 and 2015) indicated ongoing long-term research into potential effects on the brain.

=== Awareness of providers ===
The lack of knowledge and education related to transgender health is an obstacle transgender people face. A 2011 study published in JAMA reported that medical students cover up to "only five hours" of LGBT related content. A different study done by Lambda Legal in 2010 stated that 89.4% of transgender people felt that there are not enough medical providers that are "adequately trained" for their needs. This lack of medical training makes it harder for transgender people to find suitable and proper healthcare. A 2014 report by the Department of Justice found that 50% of trans people had actually had to teach their medical providers about trans healthcare.

=== Discrimination ===
A 2014 report by the Department of Justice found that 28% of trans people reported being harassed in medical settings, 19% reported being refused care, 2% reported being physically attacked in a doctor's office, 10% reported being sexually assaulted in one, 9% had been involuntarily committed, and 3% subjected to unwanted medical procedures. The report further found that it was not uncommon for trans people to be forced by psychiatric professionals to provide sexual favors in exchange for being allowed continued access to gender affirming medical care.

Transgender people also sometimes experience discrimination by healthcare professionals, who have refused to treat them for conditions both related and unrelated to their gender identity. A 2017 report by the Center for American Progress found 29 percent of transgender people reporting they were denied care by a medical provider in the preceding year due to their gender identity or sexual orientation. The same study found that 21 percent of trans people reported medical providers used abusive or harsh language when they sought care.

The Affordable Care Act (ACA) of 2010, specifically Section 1557, prohibits sex discrimination in federally funded health care facilities, and in 2012 the federal Department of Health and Human Services (HHS) clarified that this includes discrimination based on transgender status. The government's final rule in 2016 determined that the ACA forbid discrimination based on gender identity. The ACA also forbids insurance providers from refusing to cover a person based on a pre-existing condition, including being transgender. However, a federal judge in Texas in 2016 issued a nationwide injunction stopping the ACA's transgender antidiscrimination protections from taking effect, and in 2019 that same court issued a final ruling that was binding on HHS. On June 12, 2020, the Trump administration issued a new rule stating that sexual orientation and gender identity were not covered under the anti-discrimination protections of the Affordable Care Act. This rule was in effect for nearly a year until it was reversed by the Biden administration, restoring the Obama-era policy.

Complaints sent to HHS during the Trump administration indicated that medical providers were still frequently denying care to transgender people on the basis of their gender identity.

Some jurisdictions have their own laws prohibiting discrimination on the basis of sex, gender identity or gender expression in public accommodations, as well as under medical malpractice and misconduct law.

In 2020, the Supreme Court ruled in Bostock v. Clayton County that discrimination on the basis of sexual orientation or gender identity is necessarily also discrimination "because of sex" as prohibited by Title VII of the Civil Rights Act of 1964, and thus that Title VII protects employees against such discrimination.

A 2022 study on the allocation of ventilators during the pandemic found that respondents across the entire political spectrum were, when presented with the choice between allocating a ventillator to a cisgender man or a transgender person, on average less likely to allocate it to the trans person than to the cis man. In particular, respondents with conservative political leanings, when given a choice between allocating a ventilator to a cis man or a trans woman, were 14.3% less likely to allocate it to the trans woman, and when given a choice between allocating a ventilator to a cis man or a trans man, were 18.6% less likely to allocate it to the trans man.

Republican amendments to funding bills could defund trans healthcare, affecting hundreds of thousands of trans adults and children by restricting access to essential medical treatments like hormone therapy and surgeries.

==== Catholic hospitals ====
1 in 6 patients in the United States are treated in a Catholic facility. In March 2023, the United States Catholic Bishops issued guidelines for Catholic hospitals, entitled "Moral Limits to the Technological Manipulation of the Human Body", which banned the provision of gender affirming healthcare by such hospitals entirely.

==== Trans Broken Arm Syndrome ====
A form of discrimination in healthcare settings is known as "trans broken arm syndrome", in which a doctor mistakenly assumes that a trans person's medical ailments stem from their trans status or gender-affirming care and consequently treats their problem incorrectly or denies them care entirely. Trans patients often hide their trans status when visiting a doctor if their problem, such as a broken arm, is not related to their trans status. This is especially common in rural or more conservative areas.

A 2022 survey from the Center for American Progress revealed that 19 percent of trans individuals had experienced this form of discrimination in the past year.

=== Medical privacy ===
Transgender people have the right to medical privacy. According to the Health Insurance Portability and Accountability Act (HIPAA), medical providers and insurance companies are prohibited from disclosing any personal medical information including a person's transgender status. HIPAA also allows transgender people to access and receive a copy of their medical records from health care facilities.

=== Insurance coverage ===
US Medicaid coverage of health care related to gender transition for transgender people by state as of 2026 State with no explicit policy on Medicaid coverage of health care related to gender transition for transgender people State Medicaid policy explicitly includes health care coverage related to gender transition for transgender people State Medicaid policy explicitly excludes coverage of health care related to gender transition for transgender people

It can be difficult for transgender people to find insurance coverage for their medical needs.

Even though there is medical consensus that hormone therapy and gender-affirming surgery (GAS) are medically necessary for many transgender people, the kinds of health care associated with gender transition are sometimes misunderstood as cosmetic, experimental or simply unnecessary. This has led to public and private insurance companies denying coverage for such treatment. Courts have repeatedly ruled that these treatments may be medically necessary and have recognized gender dysphoria as a legitimate medical condition constituting a "serious medical need".

The ban on Medicare coverage for gender reassignment surgery was repealed by the US Department of Health and Human Services in 2014. Insurance companies, however, still hold the authority to decide whether the procedures are a medical necessity. Thus, insurance companies can decide whether they will provide Medicare coverage for the surgeries.

Under federal tax laws, the Internal Revenue Code, section 213, defines the purpose of "medical care" as "for the diagnosis, cure, mitigation, treatment, or prevention of disease, or for the purpose of affecting any structure or function of the body." Only cosmetic surgeries promoting the physical or mental health of an individual can qualify for medical deductions. Transgender people have used the diagnosis of gender dysphoria to qualify for deductible health care.

The idea that transition-related care is cosmetic or experimental has been ruled as discriminatory and out of touch with current medical thinking. The AMA and WPATH have specifically rejected these arguments, and courts have affirmed their conclusion. In a case brought by Gay and Lesbian Advocates and Defenders (GLAD), O'Donnabhain v. Commissioner, for instance, the Internal Revenue Service lost its claim that such treatments were cosmetic and experimental when a transgender woman deducted her GAS procedures as a medical expense. Courts have also found that psychotherapy alone is insufficient treatment for gender dysphoria, and that for some people, GAS may be the only effective treatment.

In April 2024, The Biden administration announced expansive new protections for gay and transgender medical patients, prohibiting federally funded health providers and insurers from discriminating on the basis of sexual orientation and gender identity. The new rules overturn Trump-era restrictions, but preserve religious exemptions. In June 2024, the attorneys general in 15 Republican-led states sued the Biden administration over the new rules. On July 3, 2024, a federal judge temporarily blocked enforcement of the new rule.

In August 2026, the U.S. Centers for Medicare & Medicaid Services issued a final rule which bars federal Medicaid funding for certain gender-affirming procedures for those under 18 and federal Children’s Health Insurance Program (CHIP) funding for those under 19.

==== State Medicaid coverage ====
In June 2022, the Florida Agency for Healthcare Administration, the agency which is responsible for overseeing the state's Medicaid service, released a report which stated that transgender hormone therapy is "experimental and investigational". The report was quickly rebuffed by the wider scientific community, with experts from Yale in July publishing an analysis in which they stated that the report ignored accepted scientific studies and consensus regarding gender dysphoria, had its writers chosen from those with ties to anti-LGBTQ groups specifically for their bias, cited sources with no scientific merit – including a student blog post and a letter to the editor, and that if the state used the same standard it used in the report to evaluate other treatments, it would no longer allow Medicaid to pay for a wide array of common medications. The Yale analysis also stated that "it seems clear that the report is not a serious scientific analysis but, rather, a document crafted to serve a political agenda" and that "medical treatment for gender dysphoria does meet generally accepted professional medical standards and is not experimental or investigational".

On August 21, 2022, Florida issued state Medicaid regulations banning coverage of sexual reassignment surgery, hormone replacement therapy, puberty blockers and "any other transgender healthcare initiatives" for all individuals, regardless of age. On June 21, 2023, the court decided in Dekker v. Weida that Medicaid must continue to cover gender-affirming healthcare. The decision was appealed. On October 13, 2023, legal representatives from 19 states—principally Attorneys General Steve Marshall of Alabama, Tim Griffin of Arkansas, and Jonathan Skrmetti of Tennessee—submitted an amicus brief arguing that the court should reverse its decision and forbid Medicaid coverage of all gender-affirming care, including care for adults. The amicus brief cited the Dobbs decision. On November 22, 2024, the 11th U.S. Circuit Court of Appeals heard arguments appealing the case.

== Prisoners' rights ==
In 1992, UC Irvine researchers published an article detailing medical experiments performed on every trans female inmate in the California state prison system, ending with all subjects being indefinitely taken off hormone therapy. When the study began, prison policy was to provide hormone therapy to all inmates who had proof of receiving hormone therapy prior to incarceration. In 1988, prison policy changed on the basis of the claim that "hormone therapy was not beneficial to the inmates' general health." The authors wrote: "withdrawal of therapy was also associated with adverse symptoms in 60 of the 86 transsexuals. Rebound androgenization, hot flashes, moodiness, and irritability or depression were the most frequent complaints." At the time, no right to access gender appropriate care existed in California state prisons.

According to the Vera Institute, 16% of trans adults in the US have been incarcerated, compared to 2.7% of cis adults, and trans people make up 59% of prison sexual assault victims.

In September 2011, a California state court denied the request of a California inmate, Lyralisa Stevens, for gender-affirming surgery at the state's expense.

On January 17, 2014, in Kosilek v. Spencer a three-judge panel of the First Circuit Court of Appeals ordered the Massachusetts Department of Corrections to provide Michelle Kosilek, a Massachusetts inmate, with gender-affirming surgery. It said denying the surgery violated Kosilek's Eighth Amendment rights, which included "receiving medically necessary treatment ... even if that treatment strikes some as odd or unorthodox".

On April 3, 2015, the U.S. Department of Justice intervened in a federal lawsuit filed in Georgia to argue that denying hormone treatment for transgender inmates violates their rights. It contended that the state's policy that only allows for continuing treatments begun before incarceration was insufficient and that inmate treatment needs to be based on ongoing assessments. The case was brought by Ashley Diamond, an inmate who had used hormone treatment for seventeen years before entering the Georgia prison system.

On May 11, 2018, the U.S. Bureau of Prisons announced that prison guidelines issued by the Obama Administration in January 2017 to allow transgender prisoners to be transferred to prisons housing inmates of the gender which they identify with had been rescinded and that assigned sex at birth would once again determine where transgender prisoners are jailed.

In August 2022, a federal judge in Nebraska ruled against a transgender woman who had been denied gender affirming care in prison, and placed in a cell with a male sex offender that proceeded to sexually assault her. In his ruling, the judge declared there to be insufficient evidence of deliberate indifference on the prison's part to the plaintiff's gender dysphoria, and that the plaintiff had not sufficiently proven that she had suffered more than minimal injuries from the sexual assault, stating that he found no support for the notion that a substantial risk of harm or deliberate indifference to it "could be plausibly inferred from a prospective cellmate's conviction of sexual offenses coupled with the alleged vulnerability of a transgender inmate transitioning to a woman in a men's prison".

During the second Trump administration, the U.S. Bureau of Prisons adopted a policy restricting gender-affirming medical care for transgender federal inmates. A federal district judge ordered the treatment to continue. In October 2026, the Supreme Court denied the Trump administration's request to stay the injunction while litigation continued.

=== V-coding ===
A 2018 report from the Indiana Maurer University School of Law, along with a subsequent report in the UCLA Journal of Gender and Law, found that, based on accounts of former inmates, it was common for trans women placed in men's prisons to be assigned to cells with aggressive cisgender male cellmates to maintain social control and to, as one inmate described it, "keep the violence rate down". Trans women used in this manner are often raped daily. This process is known as "V-coding", and has been described as so common that it is effectively "a central part of a trans woman's sentence".

The prisoners serving as "customers" for these women are informally referred to as "husbands". A 2021 California study found that 69% of trans women prisoners reported being made to perform sexual acts they would have rather not, 58.5% reported being violently sexually assaulted, and 88% overall reported having taken part in a "marriage-like relationship". Trans women who physically resist the rape are often criminally charged with assault and placed in solitary confinement, the assault charge then being used to extend the woman's prison stay and deny her parole.

It is common for correctional officers to publicly strip search trans women inmates, putting their bodies on display for staff members and other inmates. Trans women in this situation are sometimes made to dance, present, or masturbate at the correctional officers' discretion. A 2017 study by the Sylvia Rivera Law Project found that 75% of trans women respondents in New York state prisons were subjected to sexual violence by a correctional officer, with 32% being victimized by two or more COs and 27% of respondents being forced to perform oral sex for a CO.

=== ICE detention ===
Transgender men in ICE custody under the Trump Administration have reportedly been specifically subjected to forced labor programs, with justifications given by guards including "If you wanna be a man, I'll treat you like a man" and "Aren't you strong enough? Aren't you a man?". Those who refused faced punishments including beatings and solitary confinement, with many also reporting severe sexual abuse. Data is hard to come by, however, as starting in 2025 ICE stopped complying with a federal law which required them to report data on transgender people in their custody.

== Pronouns ==
As of October 2023, nine states regulate pronoun use. In April 2024, the U.S. Equal Employment Opportunity Commission (EEOC) issued guidance on gender ID pronouns. Employers refusing to use transgender workers' preferred pronouns or bar them from using bathrooms that match their known gender identity commit unlawful sex-based harassment acts.

In February 2025, an employee of the Texas Real Estate Board was fired after refusing to remove pronouns from his email signature. Elon Musk and Texas governor Greg Abbott announced their support for the firing on social media.

In May 2025, the U.S. District Court for the Northern District of Texas struck down the April 2024 EEOC guidance on gender ID pronouns in Texas v. EEOC. The court ruled that the EEOC guidance is inconsistent with Title VII of the 1964 Civil Rights Act and exceeded U.S. Supreme Court precedent.

In January 2026, the U.S. Court of Appeals for the Fourth Circuit affirmed a lower court's ruling and held that a Maryland school board's policy requiring staff to use transgender students' preferred names and pronouns did not violate a Christian teacher's First Amendment rights to free speech or religion.

== Immigration ==
In 2000, the US Ninth Circuit Court of Appeals concluded that "gay men with female sexual identities [sic] in Mexico constitute a 'particular social group'" that was persecuted and was entitled to asylum in the US (Hernandez-Montiel v. INS). Since then, several cases have reinforced and clarified the decision. Morales v. Gonzales (2007) is the only published decision in asylum law that uses "male-to-female transsexual" instead of "gay man with female sexual identity". An immigration judge stated that, under Hernandez-Montiel, Morales would have been eligible for asylum (if not for her criminal conviction).

Critics have argued that allowing transgender people to apply for asylum "would invite a flood of people who could claim a 'well-founded fear' of persecution". Precise numbers are unknown, but Immigration Equality, a nonprofit for LGBT immigrants, estimates hundreds of cases.

The United States has no process for accepting visa requests for third gender citizens from other countries. In 2015, trans HIV activist Amruta Alpesh Soni's request for a visa was delayed because her gender is listed as "T" (for transgender) on her Indian passport. To receive a visa, the State Department requires the gender identification on the visa to match the gender identification on the passport. On the other hand, the asylum process is expensive and transgender migrants do not have any voice in the asylum seeking process. For example, transgender asylum seekers must wait for their case to be processed at the U.S./Mexico Border in detention centers. Transgender asylum seekers must wait in detention where they may undergo rape, sexual assault, or harassment from authorities. ICE Detention Center agents and staff have been found to be responsible for more counts of sexual victimization against transgender migrants than detainees or inmates, specifically during strip searches in multiple studies. Transgender asylum seekers remain in detention oftentimes in solitary confinement which is extremely harmful for physical and mental health. ICE facilities along the U.S./Mexico Border deny transgender migrants Hormone Replacement Therapy (HRT) and fail to maintain records on access migrants have to the treatment. In addition, transgender migrants and transgender asylum seekers are sexually assaulted due to unsafe facilities which are separated through gender binaries.

== Military ==
=== History ===
Discharges for gender transitioning were once commonplace. In one case, a trans person who had had gender-reassignment surgery was discharged from the Air Force Reserve, a decision supported by the Court of Appeals.

==== Obama administration ====
In 2015, the Pentagon reviewed its policy regarding transgender service members and announced that its ban would be removed. It announced on June 30, 2016, that, effective immediately, existing servicemembers who came out as transgender would no longer be discharged, denied reenlistment, involuntarily separated, or denied continuation of service simply because of their gender, and that, starting in July 2017, people who already identify as transgender were welcome to join the military so long as they had already adapted to their self-identified gender for at least an 18-month period.

==== First Trump administration ====
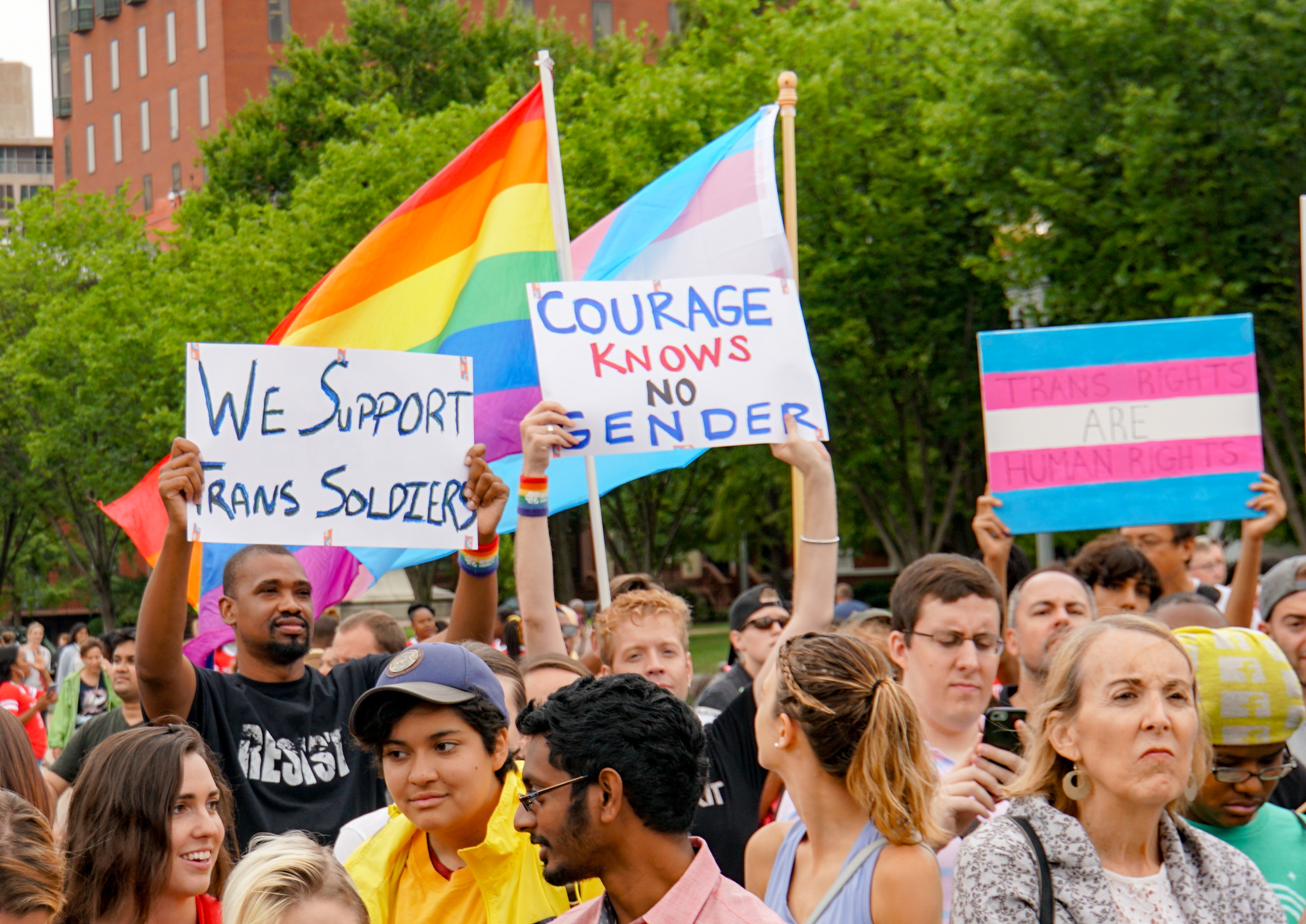
Protest in July 2017 in Washington, D.C., in support of transgender members of the US military

President Donald Trump tweeted on July 26, 2017, that transgender individuals will not be allowed to "serve in any capacity in the U.S. military". Chairman of the Joint Chiefs of Staff General Joseph Dunford pushed back, saying that the Secretary of Defense needed time to review this order. "In the meantime," he said, "we will continue to treat all of our personnel with respect." On August 1, 2017, the Palm Center released a letter signed by 56 retired generals and admirals, opposing the proposed ban on transgender military service members. The letter stated that, if implemented, the ban would "deprive the military of mission-critical talent" and would compel cisgender service members "to choose between reporting their comrades or disobeying policy". To challenge Trump's intended policy, at least four lawsuits were filed (Jane Doe v. Trump, Stone v. Trump, Karnoski v. Trump, and Stockman v. Trump), as well as bipartisan Senate and House bills (S. 1820 and H.R. 4041). On August 25, 2017, Trump signed a presidential memorandum to formalize his request for an implementation plan from the Secretary of Defense and the Secretary of Homeland Security. Several days later, Secretary of Defense Jim Mattis announced that he would set up a panel of experts to provide recommendations and that, meanwhile, currently serving transgender troops would be allowed to remain. After another memorandum in 2018, and a further memorandum in 2019, the procedures regarding serving in the armed forces were finalized.

==== Biden administration ====
President Joe Biden reversed the policy the first Trump Administration put in place to ban transgender people from serving in the military on January 25, 2021, only five days after he took the oath of office. Biden said, "It is my conviction as Commander in Chief of the Armed Forces that gender identity should not be a bar to military service. Moreover, there is substantial evidence that allowing transgender individuals to serve in the military does not have any meaningful negative impact on the Armed Forces."

Biden's executive order was implemented in a step by step process. The order Trump signed banning transgender people from the military was to be reversed, the Department of Defense was to correct the record of anyone dismissed from service due to their gender identity, and the Secretary of Defense and the Secretary of Homeland Security were to begin the process of allowing transgender service members to serve openly. On April 30, 2021, the United States Department of Defense enacted a new policy which required better medical service and assistance to transgender people serving in the United States Military.

In February 2024, the Veterans Administration issued a final ruling that it would not cover gender-affirming surgery.

The National Defense Authorization Act for Fiscal Year 2025, a bipartisan bill which Biden signed in December 2024, includes language to ban transgender healthcare financing for certain procedures for minor children of military members. The text states "medical interventions for the treatment of gender dysphoria that could result in sterilization may not be provided to a child under the age of 18."

==== Second Trump administration ====
On January 27, 2025, Trump signed an executive order called "Prioritizing Military Excellence and Readiness". On February 7, Defense Secretary Pete Hegseth signed a memo by the same name. On February 26, Under Secretary of Defense for Personnel and Readiness, Darin S. Selnick, signed a memo with more details. The effect is to ban trans people from the military. In March, U.S. District Court Judge Ana C. Reyes in Talbott v. United States and U.S. District Court Judge Benjamin H. Settle in Shilling v. United States issued preliminary injunctions. However, on May 6, the Supreme Court allowed the ban on trans personnel to take effect. In June 2026, the D.C. Circuit upheld the injunction in Talbott for plaintiffs already serving in the military. In August, the Trump administration petitioned the U.S. Supreme Court to review the ruling.

== Taxes ==
IRS Publication 502 lists medical expenses that are tax-deductible to the extent they 1) exceed 7.5% of the individual's adjusted gross income, and 2) were not paid for by any insurance or other third party. For example, a person with $20,000 gross adjusted income can deduct all medical expenses after the first $1,500 spent. If that person incurred $16,000 in medical expenses during the tax year, then $14,500 is deductible. At higher incomes where the 7.5% floor becomes substantial, the deductible amount is often less than the standard deduction, in which case it is not cost-effective to claim.

IRS Publication 502 includes several deductions that may apply to gender transition treatments, including some operations. The deduction for operations was denied to a trans woman but was restored in tax court. The deductibility of the other items in Publication 502 was never in dispute.

== Sports ==
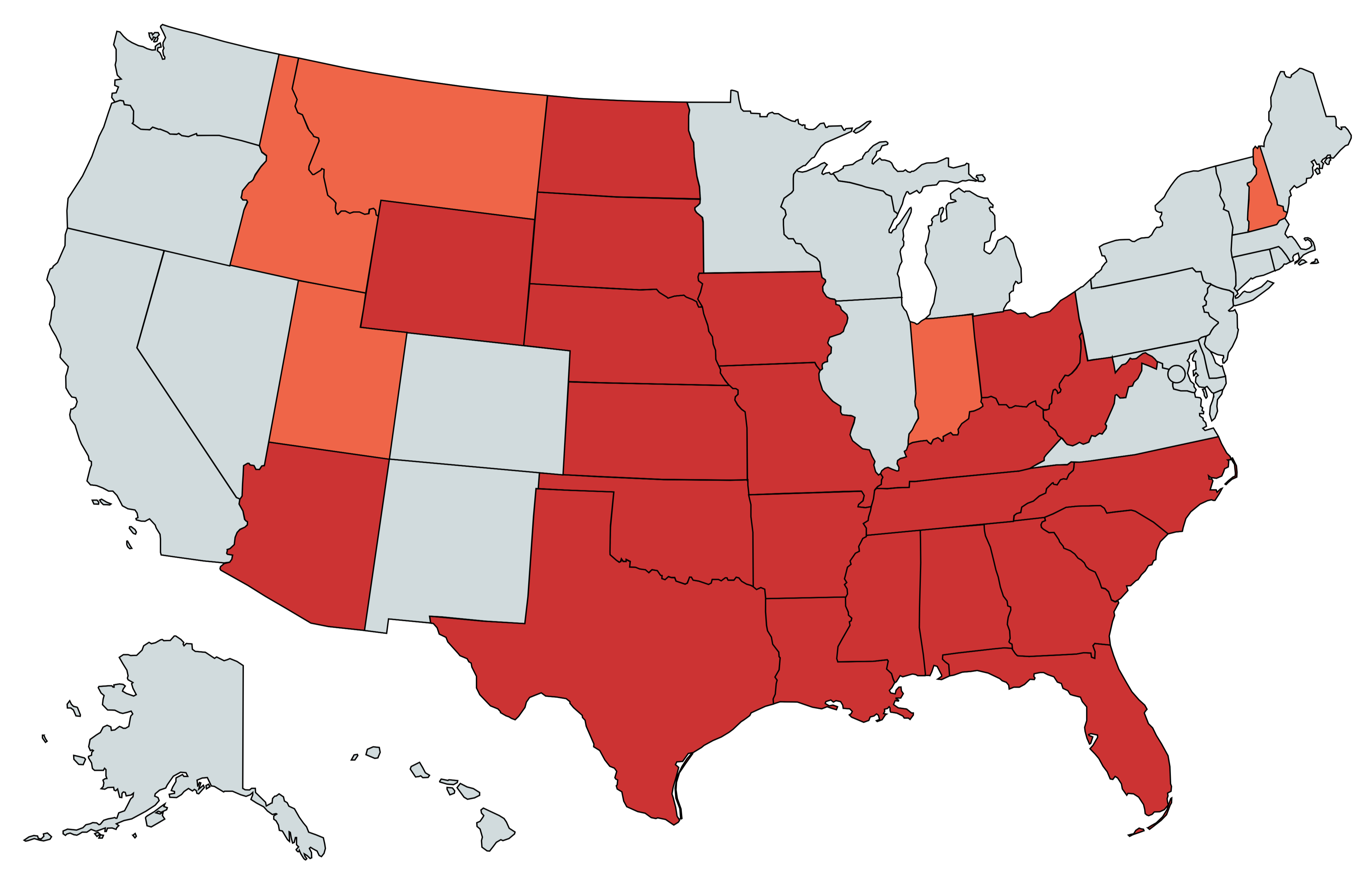
Map of state laws which ban transgender athletes from participating in the sport of their gender identity, as of June 2025: Law enacted which bans trans athletes from participating in sports based on their gender identity; enforces gender classifications in sports based on registered biological sex Law preventing trans athletes from participating in sport in their gender identity enacted, but currently blocked from enforcement via court order

27 U.S. states have banned transgender people from sports under their gender identity in various capacities. These states include Alabama, Arizona, Arkansas, Florida, Georgia, Idaho, Indiana, Iowa, Kansas, Kentucky, Louisiana, Mississippi, Missouri Montana, Nebraska New Hampshire, North Carolina, North Dakota, Ohio, Oklahoma, South Carolina, South Dakota, Tennessee, Texas, Utah, West Virginia, and Wyoming. Some of these bans only apply to school sports and some only apply to transgender women, but not transgender men.

In Oklahoma, all students who wish to play sports must submit a notarized affidavit of biological sex assigned at birth, under penalty of perjury.

In August 2022, USA Cycling, citing new regulations on trans athletes, retroactively stripped trans woman Leia Genis of her silver medal earned at the Track National Championships that had taken place in 2022.

Transgender rights organizations have argued that these discriminatory laws are not about protecting women's sports, but rather are attempts to "undermine the existence of transgender people." Transgender advocates have commented that hormone replacement therapy and testosterone suppression reduces muscle mass and physical strength in transgender women, reducing the possibility of a competitive advantage. Transgender inclusion in sports is supported by the Women's Sports Foundation, the Women's National Basketball Players Association (WNBPA), the National Women's Law Center, and Athlete Ally, as well as United States Women's National Soccer Team Captain Megan Rapinoe, tennis legend Billie Jean King, WNBA Minnesota Lynx coach Cheryl Reeve, and WNBA star Candace Parker.

The US Department of Education said in 2021 that transgender students are protected under Title IX. There has been little to no research done on youth sports and the performance of youth trans athletes. Research from 2023 on trans athletes suggested that athletes who transitioned and went through the appropriate procedures performed similarly to cisgender athletes. However, trying to make these regulations for youth transgender athletes is more difficult to do. Youth transgender athletes who only identify as the opposite gender they were assigned at birth are still genetically the gender they were born as. This is because gender reassignment surgery is typically only available for people 18 years old or older. There are ways for minors to get this surgery; however, it is an extremely difficult process, and most of the time it does not go through for the safety of the child. This means that the research done on transgender athletes' performance does not apply to them because that research is based on athletes who have undergone gender reassignment.

In November 2022, the 9th Circuit Court of Appeals ruled that the Miss United States of America pageant was allowed to categorically bar trans women from the competition, stating that the pageant's purpose was to celebrate "the ideal vision of American womanhood", and that allowing trans women to compete would make the pageant unable to do this. (This is a different pageant from Miss USA, which does admit trans women.)

In early 2023, the Florida High School Athletics Association recommended that all female athletes be mandated to supply up to date information on their menstrual cycles to a database accessible by their school's administrators. This was speculated by many to be a method of both enforcing abortion restrictions, and detecting any female athletes who might be trans women in violation of the state's ban.

In early 2023, a federal bill that would ban transgender women from competing in women's sports nationwide was introduced as HR 734, "Protecting Women and Girls in Sports Act." The bill passed the house in April 2023 with all Republicans voting for it and all Democrats voting against it. The Senate, as expected, did not take up the bill. President Biden vowed to veto it if it reached his desk.

In November 2026, voters in Arizona, Colorado, Nebraska, and Washington approved ballot measures restricting transgender students' participation in girls' and women's school sports.

=== Biden administration rule change ===
In April 2023, the Biden administration proposed a Title IX rule change which would declare blanket "one size fits all" bans on trans athletes from teams consistent with their genders a violation of Title IX, but would authorize such bans if done for a number of reasons, including "fairness in competition". According to the proposal, this would most likely mean that bans that apply to elementary school students would be forbidden, but bans on high school and college students would be authorized under Title IX.

After two delays, the final changes to Title IX were published in April 2024. The new changes cemented protections for LGBT students under federal law and reversed a number of Trump-era policies that dictated how schools should respond to cases of alleged sexual misconduct in K-12 schools and college campuses. They also effectively broadened the scope of Title IX by extending the law's reach to prohibit discrimination and harassment based on sexual orientation and gender identity, and widen the range of sexual harassment complaints that schools will be responsible for investigating. However, it did not explicitly say schools are forbidden from banning transgender women from competing in women's sports. In response to these new changes, over 20 republican-led states sued the Biden Administration and refused to follow the new rules. In June 2024, a judge temporarily blocked President Biden's proposed changes to the interpretation of Title IX in Texas. A few days later, a judge issued an injunction temporary blocking the rules in Idaho, Louisiana, Mississippi and Montana. The week after that, a judge temporarily blocked the law in Tennessee, Kentucky, Ohio, Indiana, Virginia and West Virginia. On July 2, 2024, a federal judge temporarily blocked the law in Kansas, Alaska, Utah and Wyoming. This ruling also blocks the rule from taking effect in schools in Stillwater, Oklahoma, the home of a middle school student who joined the lawsuit, as well as any schools attended by members of the Young America's Foundation and the children of members of Moms for Liberty — two national conservative groups that signed onto the lawsuit. On July 17, 2024, the Fifth and Sixth Circuits upheld two of the blocks. On July 26, 2024, a federal court temporarily blocked the rule from taking effect in Iowa, Arkansas, Missouri, Nebraska, North Dakota and South Dakota. On August 1, 2024, the rule went into effect in all the states that had blocked them.

On August 16, 2024, the Supreme Court, in a 5–4 ruling, denied an emergency request from the Biden Administration to reinstate the law while further legal battles play out in the lower court. The ruling did not address the merits of the lawsuits or whether the new rules were constitutional.

On January 9, 2025, U.S. District court judge Danny C. Reeves struck down the Biden administration's expanded protections nationwide in response to the lawsuit filed by the states of Tennessee, Kentucky, Indiana, Ohio, Virginia, and West Virginia.

=== Second Trump administration ===
In 2025, President Donald Trump signed Executive Order 14201, titled "Keeping Men Out of Women's Sports". The executive order threatens to ban federal funding from any educational institution that allows transgender girls or women to play on girls' teams, claiming a violation of Title IX. Trump's order, however, does not prevent transgender men and boys from participating in men's sports or using male-only locker rooms. Trump's order also prevents transgender girls from using locker rooms and bathrooms labeled as female only. The executive order threatens to revoke federal funding from any elementary, secondary, and post-secondary institution that allows transgender girls to play on girls' teams, claiming they are in violation of Title IX. This means many schools that allowed transgender girls athletes previously would have to stop those athletes from competing to comply with President Trump's executive order. Transgender boys, however, would still be able to compete.

The Supreme Court heard Little v. Hecox during its 2025–26 term, a case related to state laws in Idaho and West Virginia banning transgender women from playing in women's sports. Though the Ninth Circuit and Fourth Circuit respectively had both found that the state laws violated the Constitution's Equal Protection Clause and Title IX, the Supreme Court ruled on June 30, 2026, that the state bans in Idaho and West Virginia do not violate the Constitution. The Court also held that barring transgender girls and women from playing on school athletic teams does not violate Title IX.

== Summary ==
| Transgender identity | Yes / No (Most states recognize and allow the ability of transgender individuals to change their legal gender, no federal recognition) |
| Right to change gender on birth certificates or passports | Yes / No (Currently blocked on passport applications; legal gender change allowed in 47 states and DC; prohibited by statute in Tennessee as of 2020 and in Montana and Oklahoma as of 2022) |
| Legal recognition of non-binary gender | Yes / No (No federal recognition, state-level recognition in 22 states) |
| Anti-discrimination laws in employment | Yes (Since 2020) |
| Anti-discrimination laws in housing | No / Yes (Legal protections in 22 states) |
| Anti-discrimination laws in public accommodations | No / Yes (Protections in only a minority of states) |
| Anti-discrimination laws in health insurance | No |
| LGBT anti-bullying law in schools and colleges | Yes / No (Varies by state) |
| LGBT anti-discrimination law in hospitals | No |
| Freedom of expression | Yes / No (Multiple "Don't say gay" laws in states limit instruction and discussion of LGBT issues in the classroom; other states have formal protections) |
| Transgender people allowed to serve openly in the military | No (since 2025) |
| Transgender people allowed in the military | No |
| Transgender health care, such as access to GAS and hormone medications not restricted by law | No / Yes (Multiple states have blocked state Medicaid funding for transgender health care services, and have also made health care for youth with gender dysphoria illegal. On January 28, 2025, President Trump signed an executive order revoking federal funding for those who provide gender affirming care to those under 19 years of age.) |
| Transgender identity declassified as a mental illness | Yes (Reclassified as 'gender dysphoria' under DSM-5 since 2013) |
| Transgender people allowed to play in sports that match their gender identity | No / Yes (Multiple states and an executive order have banned transgender women and girls from competing in women's sports.) |

== See also ==
- Transgender disenfranchisement in the United States
- Transphobia in the United States
- Identity documents in the United States
- History of transgender people in the United States
- History of violence against LGBT people in the United States
- LGBT rights in the United States
- Intersex rights in the United States
- Transgender rights
- Name change
- List of transgender-related topics
- 2020s anti-LGBT movement in the United States
- Parental rights movement
- Anti-gender movement
- Transgender rights movement
- Transgender history
- Violence against LGBT people
