= LGBTQ rights in Georgia (U.S. state) =

- Georgia (US)
- Legal status: Legal since 1998 (Powell v. Georgia)
- Gender identity: Sex change legal
- Discrimination protections: Enacted on June 26, 2020; Gender identity protected under Glenn v. Brumby

Family rights
- Recognition of relationships: Same-sex marriage since 2015 (Obergefell v. Hodges)
- Adoption: Same-sex couples allowed to adopt

Lesbian, gay, bisexual, transgender, and queer (LGBTQ) people in the U.S. state of Georgia have most of the same rights as non-LGBTQ people. LGBTQ rights in the state have been a recent occurrence, with most improvements occurring from the 2010s onward. Same-sex sexual activity has been legal since 1998, although the state legislature has not repealed its sodomy law. Same-sex marriage has been legal in the state since 2015, in accordance with Obergefell v. Hodges. In addition, the state's largest city, Atlanta, has the state's largest LGBTQ population and holds Atlanta Pride, the largest Pride parade in the Southeastern United States. The state's hate crime laws, effective since June 26, 2020, explicitly include sexual orientation. However, in the mid-2020s, Georgia enacted laws that restrict transgender health care and participation in school sports for transgender youth.

== Laws against homosexuality ==
Homosexuality was previously criminalized based on the sodomy laws (which applied to both homosexuals and heterosexuals) which was struck down in 1998 by Powell v. Georgia (years before the 2003 federal-level strikedown by Lawrence v. Texas), making Georgia the first Deep Southern state to decriminalize same-sex sexual activity.

== Recognition of same-sex relationships ==
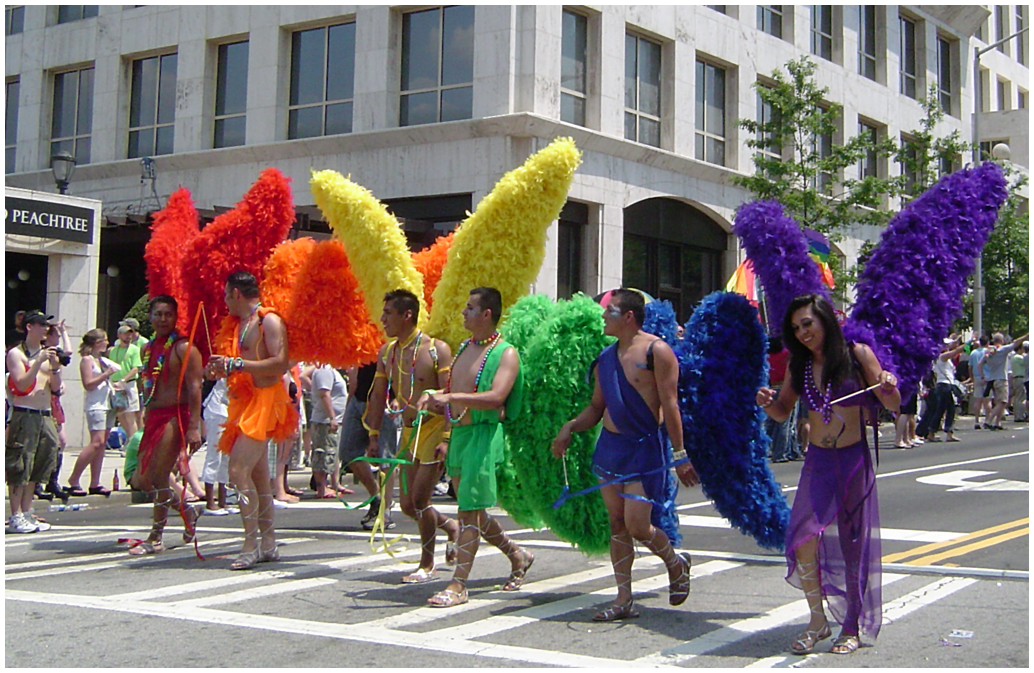
Atlanta Pride, 2007

=== Same-sex marriage ===
On November 2, 2004, Georgia voters approved Constitutional Amendment 1, which made it unconstitutional for the state to recognize or perform same-sex marriages or civil unions.

On June 26, 2015, the Supreme Court of the United States ruled in Obergefell v. Hodges that the fundamental right to marry must be guaranteed to same-sex couples. As a result, same-sex marriages became legal in the state of Georgia, along with all other U.S. states where such marriages were banned. Following the Supreme Court ruling, all Georgia counties began immediately (or were either willing) to issue marriage licenses to same-sex couples.

=== Domestic partnership ===
Prior to the nationwide legalization of same-sex marriages, some cities and counties in Georgia offered domestic partnership benefits to same-sex couples, which granted some of the marriage rights. Domestic partnerships were recognized by the cities of Athens, Atlanta, Avondale Estates, Clarkston, Decatur, Doraville, East Point, Pine Lake and Savannah, as well as DeKalb County and Fulton County.

== Adoption and parental rights ==
On February 23, 2018, the Georgia State Senate passed the Keep Faith in Adoption and Foster Care Act (or SB 375), that called for allowing private adoption agencies receiving state funds to deny adoptions for certain couples or individual parents based on religious beliefs. Opponents claimed the bill targeted same-sex couples and LGBT individuals seeking to adopt. The Georgia House of Representatives did not eventually vote on the bill, effectively killing it.

The bill was reintroduced by Senator Marty Harbin on February 5, 2020, under the name SB 368, and is soon to be referred to the Senate Judiciary Committee.

On March 5, 2018, Governor Nathan Deal signed into law bill HB 159, which includes no restrictions against same-sex couples seeking to adopt.

There are no restrictions on either IVF or surrogacy.

== Discrimination protections ==
Map of Georgia counties and cities that enacted sexual orientation and/or gender identity anti–employment discrimination ordinances prior to Bostock v. Clayton County: Sexual orientation and gender identity with anti–employment discrimination ordinance Sexual orientation with anti–employment discrimination ordinance Sexual orientation and gender identity solely in public employment Sexual orientation in public employment Does not protect sexual orientation and gender identity in employment

Since June 26, 2020, Georgia protects its citizens from discrimination on the basis of sexual orientation.

Prior to Bostock v. Clayton County, state law did not protect against employee discrimination based on sexual orientation or gender identity. However, some cities and counties in the state have enacted local ordinances banning such discrimination in varying degrees.

The cities of Atlanta, Clarkston and Doraville have ordinances prohibiting discrimination based on sexual orientation or gender identity in both public and private employment.

Gwinnett County has a Human Relations Commission that ensures fair and equal treatment and opportunity for all persons, with protections including gender identity and sexual orientation. In 2020, County Commissioner Ku stated that internal Gwinnett County policies were updated to provide protection that includes protections with gender identity and sexual orientation for public employment. In May 2021, The Columbus city council passed a resolution to make a create a similar panel, which will be voted on for approval by August 31.

Additional cities have enacted more limited protections, prohibiting discrimination against public municipal employees only. The cities of Athens, Augusta, Avondale Estates, Columbus, Decatur, Macon, Pine Lake and Savannah have ordinances banning discrimination based on sexual orientation or gender identity in public employment, while the cities of East Point, Sandy Springs, and Tybee Island, as well as the counties of DeKalb and Fulton have similar anti–discrimination ordinances in public employment covering only sexual orientation.

=== Glenn v. Brumby ===
Note that statutory law does not provide protections based on gender identity, but on December 6, 2011, in Glenn v. Brumby, the Eleventh Circuit Court of Appeals upheld a lower-court ruling that firing someone based on gender-nonconformity violates the Constitution’s prohibition on sex discrimination. The Court of Appeals found the Georgia General Assembly had discriminated against Vandy Beth Glenn, a transgender woman who was fired from her job as legislative editor after telling her supervisor that she planned to transition from male to female. This effectively provides legal protections to transgender and gender non-conforming employees in the states of Alabama, Florida and Georgia.

=== Anti–bullying laws ===
Georgia law bans bullying at schools, though it does not list individual protected groups.

Nonetheless, DeKalb County and Fulton County have regulations for teachers that address bullying and harassment based on sexual orientation or gender identity. Gwinnett County Public schools prohibits discrimination by sexual orientation and gender identity in their Student Conduct Behavior Code.

=== Atlanta LGBT cultural training ===
In September 2021, the city of Atlanta passed a city-wide ordinance that legally requires all city employees of Atlanta to undergo "LGBT cultural training".

== Hate crime law ==
Both sexual orientation and gender identity are explicitly covered under the U.S. federal hate crime law since Matthew Shepard and James Byrd, Jr. Hate Crimes Prevention Act was signed into law in October 2009 by Barack Obama - right after being passed (as an attachment to a military funding authorisation bill) by US Congress.

In June 2020, the Georgia General Assembly overwhelmingly passed (47-6 vote in the Senate and 127-38 vote in the House) a hate crimes bill that explicitly includes sexual orientation. The bill was signed into law by Governor of Georgia Brian P. Kemp on June 26, 2020.

In November 2020, Macon, Georgia mayor Robert Reichert vetoed an anti-discrimination ordinance for all Macon residents who are LGBTQIA+. The ordinance had received the majority of the vote from residents and a 5-4 vote by the Macon-Bibb Commission. In an official statement from the Mayor's office, Reichert stated that "after prayerful consideration" he would be vetoing the legislation. Opponents of the bill focused on how they felt the issue of enacting legislation to protect LGBTQ+ people went against their rights to their religious beliefs. “In fact, this ordinance takes away the business owners' freedom to practice religion, and instead coerces many Christian and Jewish faith-based people in our county to accept the LGBTQ lifestyle as one of their moral beliefs,” said former mayoral candidate Blake Sullivan. Reichert stated the apprehension of the commissioners to amend the bill to address religious freedom concerns also attributed to his decision. Supporters of the bill, including many local attorneys urged him to sign it, claiming that Reichert had not referenced any specific legal concerns.

== Transgender rights ==
=== Identity documents ===
Georgia permits post-operative binary transgender people to amend their sex on their birth certificates, driver's licenses, and state identification cards.

=== Healthcare ===
On March 23, 2023, the governor signed Senate Bill 140, a bill prohibiting doctors from prescribing hormones for or performing gender-affirming surgery on minors as part of gender-affirming care. It does not prohibit them from prescribing puberty blockers. It took effect July 1, 2023.

In February 2025 Memorial Health University Medical Center stopped performing gender-affirming surgeries in response to Trump's executive orders.

=== Sports ===
The Georgia House of Representatives passed House Bill 1084 (HB 1084) on March 4, 2022, by a vote of 92–63. The legislation authorized the Georgia High School Association (GHSA) to establish policies regarding the participation of transgender athletes in school sports, including the authority to either permit or restrict such participation. Although the bill included a provision calling for the formation of a special committee to investigate the issue before implementing any restrictions, GHSA did not wait for the law to take effect on July 1, 2022 or form the committee. The Georgia Senate passed the bill with amendments on March 30, 2022, by a vote of 32–21, and the House agreed to those amendments by a vote of 98–71. Governor Brian Kemp signed the bill into law on April 28, 2022, and it took effect on July 1, 2022.

On May 4, 2022, the GHSA voted unanimously (62–0) to require student-athletes to compete based on the sex listed on their birth certificates, a policy that effectively restricts transgender students from participating on teams that align with their gender identity. The policy took effect for the 2022–2023 school year on August 1, 2022. State Senator Sally Harrell criticized the GHSA for making this policy decision without forming the special investigative committee outlined in the bill. GHSA Executive Director Robin Hines defended the vote, stating that GHSA acted independently of the bill and framed the decision as necessary to maintain competitive fairness.

==== Senate Bill 1 ====
In 2025, Georgia expanded these restrictions through Senate Bill 1, also known as the Riley Gaines Act. The bill is named after former collegiate swimmer Riley Gaines, an advocate for policies barring transgender women from participating in women’s sports. This legislation defines male and female based on reproductive system characteristics. It requires all public K–12 schools, public universities, and any private schools or postsecondary institutions that participate in state-funded athletic competitions to designate athletic teams as male, female, or coeducational. The law applies broadly to any educational institution receiving public funding or participating in interscholastic or intercollegiate athletic competitions governed by state-recognized athletic associations.

The legislation also mandates that locker rooms, restrooms, and overnight accommodations for school-sponsored activities be designated for use exclusively by individuals of the same sex, as defined by the state, though it allows reasonable accommodations in limited circumstances. The Georgia Professional Standards Commission (GaPSC) is directed to enforce provisions of the law, including investigating violations and issuing administrative sanctions against educators or school personnel who fail to comply.

Senate Bill 1 passed the Georgia Senate on February 6, 2025, by a vote of 35-17 and passed the House on March 31, 2025, by a vote of 100-64. Governor Brian Kemp signed the bill into law on April 28, 2025. It was scheduled to go into effect on July 1, 2025.

==== Public opinion (transgender women sports ban) ====
A poll conducted by the Atlanta Journal-Constitution from January 2 to January 10, 2025, surveyed 1,000 registered Georgia voters regarding transgender participation in school sports. The poll, administered by the University of Georgia’s School of Public and International Affairs Survey Research Center, had a margin of error of ±3.1 percentage points.

When asked whether they would "favor or oppose laws or policies that require transgender athletes to compete on sports teams that match the sex on their original birth certificate, not the gender they identify with", 70.1% of respondents indicated support, with 59.9% "strongly favor" and 10.2% "somewhat favor". Conversely, 23.6% opposed, with 13.8% "strongly oppose" and 9.8% "somewhat oppose", while the remaining 6.3% didn't know.

Despite majority support for these restrictions, the same poll found that 85.8% of voters believe transgender individuals experience discrimination in Georgia, with 40% believing they suffer "a great deal," 24.8% "a fair amount," and 21% "some." Meanwhile, 9.5% believe transgender individuals experience "none at all," and 4.7% responded "don’t know."

== US citizenship court case ==
In August 2020, a Georgia federal judge in Atlanta granted a daughter of two American married same-sex fathers US citizenship, despite being born in England to a surrogate.

== Public opinion ==
A March 2004 Associated Press Exit Poll found that 42% of Georgia voters supported the legal recognition of same-sex couples, with 17% supporting same-sex marriage, 25% supporting civil unions or partnerships but not marriage, and 50% favoring no legal recognition.

A 2012 Public Policy Polling survey found that 27% of Georgia residents thought same-sex marriage should be legal, while 65% thought it should be illegal, while 8% were not sure. A separate question on the same survey found that 57% of Georgia residents supported the legal recognition of same-sex couples, with 24% supporting same-sex marriage, 33% supporting civil unions or partnerships but not marriage, and 40% favoring no legal recognition, with 3% not sure.

An August 2013 Public Policy Polling survey found that 32% of Georgia residents thought same-sex marriage should be legal, while 60% thought it should be illegal, while 9% were not sure. A separate question on the same survey found that 57% of Georgia residents supported the legal recognition of same-sex couples, with 28% supporting same-sex marriage, 29% supporting civil unions or partnerships but not marriage, and 39% favoring no legal recognition, with 3% unsure.

A September 2013 Atlanta Journal-Constitution survey found that 48% of Georgia residents thought same-sex marriage should be legal, while 43% thought it should be illegal, while 9% were not sure.

A 2017 Public Religion Research Institute (PRRI) poll found that 52% of Georgia residents supported same-sex marriage, while 39% opposed it and 10% were unsure. The same poll also found that 65% of Georgians supported an anti-discrimination law covering sexual orientation and gender identity, while 29% were opposed. Furthermore, 56% were against allowing businesses to refuse to serve gay and lesbian people due to religious beliefs, while 34% supported allowing such religiously-based refusals.

== Summary table ==
Right	Status
Same-sex sexual activity legal	Yes (since 1998, see Powell v. State)
Equal age of consent	Yes
Anti-discrimination laws in employment	Yes (since 2020, see Bostock v. Clayton County)
Anti-discrimination laws in the provision of goods and services	Yes (since 2020)
Same-sex marriage	Yes (since 2015)
Stepchild adoption by same-sex couples	Yes
Joint adoption by same-sex couples	Yes
Adoption by single people regardless of sexual orientation	Yes
LGBTQ people allowed to serve openly in the military	Yes (since 2011, for gay, lesbian and bisexual individuals, since 2021 for transgender individuals
Right to change legal gender	No / Yes (allowed only for binary trans people and requires sex reassignment surgery)
Access to IVF for lesbian couples	Yes
Conversion therapy banned by law	No (Localities are prohibited from passing ordinances banning conversion therapy under the 11th Circuit Courts ruling in November 2020)
Commercial surrogacy for gay male couples	Yes
MSMs allowed to donate blood	No / Yes (Three month deferral period according to federal policy.)

== See also ==
- Law of Georgia (U.S. state)
- Shooting of Scout Schultz
- Atlanta Pride
- Atlanta Black Pride
- Savannah Pride Center
