= LGBTQ employment discrimination in the United States =

Map of states that have sexual orientation and gender identity discrimination prohibited in public and/or private employment via state statute, executive order, regulation, and/or case law. Note: Employment discrimination based on sexual orientation or gender identity is also prohibited under federal law. Sexual orientation and gender identity discrimination prohibited in public and private employment Gender identity discrimination prohibited in public and private employment Sexual orientation discrimination prohibited in public and private employment. Sexual orientation and gender identity discrimination prohibited in public employment Sexual orientation and gender identity discrimination prohibited in public employment. Gender identity discrimination prohibited in private employment. Sexual orientation and gender identity discrimination prohibited in public employment only No state-level prohibition on discrimination based on sexual orientation or gender identity. Sexual orientation discrimination prohibited in public employment only

LGBTQ employment discrimination in the United States is illegal under Title VII of the Civil Rights Act of 1964; employment discrimination on the basis of sexual orientation or gender identity is encompassed by the law's prohibition of employment discrimination on the basis of sex. Prior to the landmark cases Bostock v. Clayton County and R.G. & G.R. Harris Funeral Homes Inc. v. Equal Employment Opportunity Commission (2020), employment protections for LGBTQ people were patchwork; several states and localities explicitly prohibit harassment and bias in employment decisions on the basis of sexual orientation and/or gender identity, although some only cover public employees. Prior to the Bostock decision, the Equal Employment Opportunity Commission (EEOC) interpreted Title VII to cover LGBTQ employees; the EEOC determined that transgender employees were protected under Title VII in 2012, and extended the protection to encompass sexual orientation in 2015.

== Federal employees and law ==
Presidents have established certain protections for some employees of the federal government by executive order. It was not for years that a president did in fact establish an executive order in order to protect LGBTQ discrimination in the work force. In 1995, President Bill Clinton's Executive Order 12968 establishing criteria for the issuance of security clearances included sexual orientation for the first time in its non-discrimination language: "The United States Government does not discriminate on the basis of race, color, religion, sex, national origin, disability, or sexual orientation in granting access to classified information." It also said that "no inference" about suitability for access to classified information "may be raised solely on the basis of the sexual orientation of the employee." Clinton's Executive Order 13087 in 1998 prohibited discrimination based on sexual orientation in the competitive service of the federal civilian workforce. It applied to employees of the government of the District of Columbia and the United States Postal Service and to civilian employees of the armed forces, but not to certain excepted services, such as the Central Intelligence Agency, National Security Agency, and the Federal Bureau of Investigation. Clinton acknowledged its limitations in a statement:

The Executive Order states Administration policy but does not and cannot create any new enforcement rights (such as the ability to proceed before the Equal Employment Opportunity Commission). Those rights can be granted only by legislation passed by the Congress, such as the Employment Non-Discrimination Act.

At the start of 2010, the Obama administration included gender identity among the classes protected against discrimination under the authority of the Equal Employment Opportunity Commission (EEOC). It was Obama's wish to further attend to LGBTQ civil rights not only through legislation, but also the executive branch. In 2012 the Equal Employment Opportunity Commission ruled that Title VII of the Civil Rights Act of 1964 does not allow gender identity-based employment discrimination because it is a form of sex discrimination. In 2015, the Equal Employment Opportunity Commission concluded that Title VII of the Civil Rights Act of 1964 does not allow sexual orientation discrimination in employment because it is a form of sex discrimination.

In March 2018, the Sixth Circuit Court of Appeals ruled in EEOC v. RG & GR Harris Funeral Homes that transgender people are protected by federal sex discrimination laws. By August of that year, 16 states had joined an amicus brief asking the U.S. Supreme Court to reconsider the ruling. The Supreme Court agreed to hear the case as R.G. & G.R. Harris Funeral Homes Inc. v. Equal Employment Opportunity Commission and in a 6–3 decision on June 15, 2020, the Court held that Title VII protections pursuant to § 2000e-2(a)(1) did extend to cover sexual orientation and gender identity.

On March 31, 2014, U.S. District Court Judge Colleen Kollar-Kotelly ruled in the case of TerVeer v. Billington, that Peter TerVeer can sue for discrimination under Title VII of the Civil Rights Act, that bans sex discrimination, claiming that he faced discrimination after his boss found out that he was gay. Title VII does not explicitly protect against sexual orientation discrimination, but Judge Kollar-Kotelly's ruling leaves that a person could bring a claim under Title VII's ban on sex discrimination because an employer views an employee's sexual orientation as "not consistent with acceptable gender roles."

On July 21, 2014, President Obama signed Executive Order 13672, adding "gender identity" to the categories protected against discrimination in hiring in the federal civilian workforce and both "sexual orientation" and gender identity" to the categories protected against discrimination in hiring and employment on the part of federal government contractors and sub-contractors. On July 31, 2014, Obama also signed Executive Order 13673, "Fair Pay and Safe Workplaces," requiring companies with large federal contracts to prove their compliance with labor laws; this executive order, however, was revoked by President Trump on March 27, 2017.

In 2017, the Trump administration, through the Department of Justice, reversed the Obama-era policy which used Title VII to protect transgender employees from discrimination.

A bill to ban employment discrimination on the basis of sexual orientation and gender identity, the Employment Non-Discrimination Act (ENDA), was introduced repeatedly in the U.S. Congress since 1994. Under the ENDA, it was illegal for an employer to discriminate against their employees due to their sexual orientation or gender identity. Unlike the Equality Act of 1974, the main focus of the ENDA was to end employment discrimination. In 1994, the ENDA only made it illegal for employers to discriminate against employees based on their sexual orientation. By 2007, discrimination based on gender identity had been added to the law as well. In 2015, a broader bill, the Equality Act, was introduced in place of this.

In March 2019, a group representing the Department of Justice's LGBTQ employees addressed a letter to Attorney General William Barr, complaining about the increasing hostility and discrimination towards the LGBTQ employees. The group also claimed that LGBTQ employees had left the department due to alleged mistreatment and that the department did nothing to recruit and retain top LGBTQ employees.

== State law prior to Bostock v. Clayton County, Georgia ==
Pennsylvania became the first state to ban public sector employment discrimination based on sexual orientation in 1975. Wisconsin became the first state to ban both public and private sector employment discrimination based on sexual orientation in 1982. Minnesota became the first state to ban employment discrimination based on both sexual orientation and gender identity when it passed the Human Rights Act in 1993. Currently, 25/50 states, the District of Columbia, and at least 400 cities and counties have enacted bans on discrimination based on sexual orientation and gender identity.

25 out of 50 US states, and the District of Columbia, Guam, Puerto Rico, and the US Virgin Islands have statutes that explicitly codifies and protects against both sexual orientation and gender identity discrimination in employment in both the public and private sector: California, Colorado, Connecticut, Delaware, Hawaii, Illinois, Maine, Maryland, Massachusetts, Michigan, Minnesota, Nevada, New Hampshire, New Jersey, New Mexico, New York, Oregon, Rhode Island, Utah, Vermont, Virginia, and Washington. One state being Pennsylvania have acquired such protections through executive orders, regulations, court rulings or binding decisions under a human rights commission since 2018.

In addition, two states, Indiana, Iowa (since 2025) and Wisconsin prohibit discrimination on account of sexual orientation only; gender identity is not addressed. Indiana, in accordance with Hively v Ivy Tech Community College, a ruling by the Seventh Circuit Court of Appeals, and Wisconsin through a statute enacted in 1982, which made Wisconsin the first state to have private employment protections for sexual orientation. Similarly to Indiana, the Courts of Appeals for the Sixth, and Eleventh Circuits, covering Alabama, Florida, Georgia, Kentucky, Michigan, Ohio, and Tennessee, have found sex protections in the 1964 Civil Rights Act to include the category of gender identity.

Furthermore, 8 U.S. states -- Arizona, Indiana, Ohio, Kentucky, Montana, North Carolina, Wisconsin, and Kansas. -- have an executive order, administrative order, or personnel regulation prohibiting discrimination in public employment only based on either sexual orientation or gender identity: An additional 2 states -- Alaska and Missouri -- and the Commonwealth of the Northern Mariana Islands have executive orders prohibiting discrimination in public employment based on sexual orientation only.

The remaining states do not offer any type of discrimination protections for the LGBTQ community at the state level, although some cities and localities have passed their own ordinances within these states.

=== Chronological order ===
1972: No LGBTQ civil rights at the state level, although the first local protections were enacted this year in Michigan (in East Lansing and Ann Arbor).
1973: District of Columbia: Sexual orientation protected in all employment
1975: Pennsylvania: Sexual orientation protected in state employment
1979: California: Sexual orientation protected in state employment
1982: Wisconsin: Sexual orientation protected in all employment
1983: New York: Sexual orientation protected in state employment
Ohio: Sexual orientation protected in state employment
1985: New Mexico: Sexual orientation protected in state employment
Rhode Island: Sexual orientation protected in state employment
Washington: Sexual orientation protected in state employment
1987: Oregon: Sexual orientation protected in state employment
1988: Oregon: Sexual orientation no longer protected in state employment
1989: Massachusetts: Sexual orientation protected in all employment
1990: Colorado: Sexual orientation protected in state employment
1991: Connecticut: Sexual orientation protected in all employment
Hawaii: Sexual orientation protected in all employment
Minnesota: Sexual orientation protected in state employment
New Jersey: Sexual orientation protected in state employment
1992: California: Sexual orientation protected in all employment
Louisiana: Sexual orientation protected in state employment
New Jersey: Sexual orientation protected in all employment
Vermont: Sexual orientation protected in all employment
Oregon: Sexual orientation protected in state employment
1993: Minnesota: Sexual orientation and gender identity protected in all employment
1995: Maryland: Sexual orientation protected in state employment
Rhode Island: Sexual orientation protected in all employment
1996: Illinois: Sexual orientation protected in state employment
Louisiana: Sexual orientation no longer protected in state employment
1998: New Hampshire: Sexual orientation protected in all employment
1999: Iowa: Sexual orientation and gender identity protected in state employment
Nevada: Sexual orientation protected in all employment
Ohio: Sexual orientation no longer protected in state employment
Delaware: Sexual orientation protected in state employment
Iowa: Sexual orientation and gender identity no longer protected in state employment
Montana: Sexual orientation protected in state employment
2001: Indiana: Sexual orientation protected in state employment
Maine: Sexual orientation protected in state employment
Maryland: Sexual orientation protected in all employment
Rhode Island: Gender identity protected in all employment
2002: Alaska: Sexual orientation protected in state employment
New York: Sexual orientation protected in all employment
2003: Arizona: Sexual orientation protected in state employment
California: Gender identity protected in all employment
Kentucky: Sexual orientation and gender identity protected in state employment
Michigan: Sexual orientation protected in state employment
New Mexico: Sexual orientation and gender identity protected in all employment
Pennsylvania: Gender identity protected in state employment
2004: Indiana: Gender identity protected in state employment
Louisiana: Sexual orientation protected in state employment
2005: Illinois: Sexual orientation and gender identity protected in all employment
Maine: Sexual orientation and gender identity protected in all employment
Virginia: Sexual orientation protected in state employment
2006: District of Columbia: Gender identity protected in all employment
Kentucky: Sexual orientation and gender identity no longer protected in state employment
New Jersey: Gender identity protected in all employment
Washington: Sexual orientation and gender identity protected in all employment
2007: Colorado: Sexual orientation and gender identity protected in all employment
Iowa: Sexual orientation and gender identity protected in all employment
Kansas: Sexual orientation and gender identity protected in state employment
Maryland: Gender identity protected in state employment
Michigan: Gender identity protected in state employment
Ohio: Sexual orientation and gender identity protected in state employment
Oregon: Sexual orientation and gender identity protected in all employment
Vermont: Gender identity protected in all employment
2008: Kentucky: Sexual orientation and gender identity protected in state employment
Louisiana: Sexual orientation no longer protected in state employment
2009: Delaware: Sexual orientation protected in all employment
Delaware: Gender identity protected in state employment
New York: Gender identity protected in state employment
2010: Virginia: Sexual orientation no longer protected in state employment
Missouri: Sexual orientation protected in state employment
2011: Ohio: Gender identity no longer protected in state employment
Massachusetts: Gender identity protected in state employment
Hawaii: Gender identity protected in all employment
Nevada: Gender identity protected in all employment
Connecticut: Gender identity protected in all employment
Alabama: Gender identity protected in all employment
Florida: Gender identity protected in all employment
Georgia: Gender identity protected in all employment
2012: Massachusetts: Gender identity protected in all employment
2013: Puerto Rico: Sexual orientation and gender identity protected in all employment
Delaware: Gender identity protected in all employment
2014: Virginia: Sexual orientation and gender identity protected in state employment
Maryland: Gender identity protected in all employment
2015: Kansas: Sexual orientation and gender identity no longer protected in state employment
Utah: Sexual orientation and gender identity protected in all employment
Guam: Sexual orientation and gender identity protected in all employment
2016: Montana: Gender identity protected in state employment
New York: Gender identity protected in all employment
North Carolina: Sexual orientation and gender identity protected in state employment
Louisiana: Sexual orientation and gender identity protected in state employment
New Hampshire: Sexual orientation and gender identity protected in state employment
2017: Indiana: Sexual orientation protected in all employment
Louisiana: Sexual orientation and gender identity no longer protected in state employment
2018: Kentucky: Gender identity protected in all employment
Michigan: Gender identity protected in all employment
Ohio: Gender identity protected in all employment
Tennessee: Gender identity protected in all employment
Michigan: Sexual orientation and gender identity protected in all employment
New Hampshire: Gender identity protected in all employment
Pennsylvania: Sexual orientation and gender identity protected in all employment
Ohio: Sexual orientation and gender identity protected in state employment
2019: Wisconsin: Sexual orientation and gender identity protected in state employment
Kansas: Sexual orientation and gender identity protected in state employment
2020: Virginia: Sexual orientation and gender identity protected in all employment
2022: Michigan: Sexual orientation and gender identity protected in all employment
2023: Arizona: Sexual orientation and gender identity protected in state employment
Virgin Islands: Sexual orientation and gender identity protected in all employment
Michigan: Sexual orientation and gender identity protected in all employment codified
2025: Iowa: Gender identity no longer protected in all employment

== Private sector policies ==
Many large companies provide equal rights and benefits to their lesbian, gay, bisexual, and transgender employees, as measured by the Human Rights Campaign (HRC) through its Corporate Equality Index. The 2015 report found 366 businesses achieved a top rating of 100 percent. The report also found 89% of Fortune 500 businesses have non-discrimination policies on the basis of sexual orientation, while 66% of Fortune 500 businesses have non-discrimination policies on the basis of gender identity. Each year, corporations send thousands of employees to the Out & Equal Regional Summit, a conference that aims to create a more inclusive work environment for lesbian, gay, bisexual and transgender employees. There are workplace resources for how allies can create a more inclusive work environment, including programs available through PFLAG.

Widespread adoption of private workplace policies may be motivated by good business sense, the Williams Institute suggests. Its conclusion is based on a set of studies that show that lesbians and gay men who have come out at work report lower levels of anxiety, less conflict between work and personal life, greater job satisfaction, more sharing of employers' goals, higher levels of satisfaction with their co-workers, more self-esteem, and better physical health.

== Impact of court interpretation on cases ==
=== Statutory interpretation ===
Statutory interpretation is when the Court determines the meaning of a statute, using a variety of methods, to make a ruling in a case.

Before Bostock v. Clayton County (2020), there were numerous court cases that discussed the meaning of “sex” in Title VII of the Civil Rights Act of 1964. Two of the more important cases involving statutory interpretation were Price Waterhouse v. Hopkins (1989) and Oncale v. Sundowner (1998).

In Price Waterhouse, the plaintiff, Ann Hopkins, sued her employer when her proposal for partnership was dismissed and claimed it was because of her being a woman. The Supreme Court noted that Hopkins’ failure to meet gender norms was taken into account by Price Waterhouse when making their employment decision. The Court stated in their decision that Title VII is violated when sex-based considerations and/or gender is used to make decisions regarding employment. By using statutory interpretation in the majority opinion, the Court in Price Waterhouse expanded the interpretation of Title VII to “establish liability if a plaintiff proved sex was a “motivating” or “substantial” factor in a decision based on a mix of legitimate and illegitimate factors”.

In Oncale v. Sundowner Offshore Services, Inc., Joseph Oncale, an employee on an oil platform crew for Sundowner Offshore Services claimed he was sexually harassed by other employees and received no support from management. Oncale proceeded to file a complaint against his employer claiming his rights under Title VII were violated by the sexual harassment that had taken place at work. The Court ruled unanimously that all discrimination based on sex was in violation of Title VII of the Civil Rights Act regardless of the victim’s gender. The statutory interpretation by the Court allowed for a precedent to be set for deciding the outcome in same-sex harassment cases. By establishing this precedent, the Court made a statement for same-sex harassment cases that sets up the outcomes of numerous other cases centered on the question of LGBTQ protections under Title VII.

In Bostock v. Clayton County, Gerald Bostock, an employee of Clayton County, Georgia, expressed interest in participating in a gay recreational softball league in 2013. Shortly after, he was ridiculed by colleagues for his choices, including those related to his sexual orientation. After being abruptly fired for “conduct unbecoming of its employees,” Bostock filed a claim with the EEOC because he believed his firing was discriminatory. Bostock lays out his argument using the plain-text approach of statutory interpretation that the Court agrees with and rules in his favor. The argument consisted of analyzing the broad meaning of “because of sex” and looking at the dictionary definition of “homosexual.” Because of this statutory groundwork, Bostock argues that discriminating against an employee for their sexual orientation “requires an employer to intentionally treat individual employees differently because of their sex,” and thus, is able to convince the Court to rule that sexual orientation discrimination violates the protections laid out in Title VII. Although the Court agrees with Bostock and rules in his favor, the use of statutory interpretation may cause a troublesome future for this precedent. A simple majority vote in Congress would be effective in reversing the decision by the Court and overruling their interpretation of Title VII.

=== Constitutional interpretation ===
Constitutional interpretation is when the Court determines the constitutionality of a bill, act, statute, or law that is brought before the Court.

After entering the home of John Lawrence, Houston police discovered Lawrence performing sexual acts with another man and arrested them both for breaking a Texas law. In Lawrence v. Texas (2003), the Texas law, which prohibited engaging with a member of the same sex in a sexual act, made its way to the Supreme Court where they struck down the law because of its violation of the Due Process Clause of the Fourteenth Amendment. Through the moral reasoning approach, the Court expanded on the meaning of “liberty” in the Fourteenth Amendment to include those of same-sex individuals and thus protect them under that amendment.

In United States v. Windsor (2013), the Supreme Court’s decision established the groundwork needed for the landmark decision in Obergefell v. Hodges in 2015. A couple married legally under Canadian law, Edith Windsor and Thea Spyer, moved to New York where their marriage was recognized but when filing taxes for the federal government, the United States did not recognize their marriage. Windsor sued the federal government declaring that the Defence of Marriage Act (DOMA) was unconstitutional. After lots of input from other government agencies and branches, the Supreme Court reached a decision in 2013 confirming that DOMA creates a “disadvantage, a separate status, and so a stigma” against same-sex couples which violates their protections under the Fifth Amendment. By using a broad understanding of 'equal protection' in the majority opinion, the Court extended the protections of the Constitution to include the LGBTQ community and set a precedent, yet again, for future cases. Even more, the Court made clear that defining marriage has always been a right of the states and not the federal government and therefore, the Court established their decision to hear and rule on the case as constitutional. This interpretation by the Court may cause mixed emotions because of their controversial manner of reversing a policy passed in a democratic way by Congress however, because of the previous statement, the Court was required to interfere to prohibit the discrimination of a specific group of people.

The landmark LGBTQ rights case came in 2015 with the Supreme Court’s decision in Obergefell v. Hodges that guaranteed Fourteenth Amendment protections and liberties to same-sex couples. The majority held the prohibition against same-sex marriage from multiple states as unconstitutional and reflected both the judicial precedent and historical reasoning approach in their ruling. Further, the Court extended their argument by claiming that there was no legal argument for refusing same-sex couples the right to marry in any state. In the opinion, the Court reflects on de Tocqueville's description of marriage as "'the foundation of the family and of society, without which there would be neither civilization nor progress,'" from Maynard v. Hill (1888). Again, opponents of this interpretation claim the Supreme Court is overstepping their constitutional authority however, the majority definitively states that "when the rights of persons are violated, 'the Constitution requires redress by the courts.'"

== LGBTQ people's experiences of workplace discrimination and harassment ==
In 2020, 8.9% of employed LGBT people, including 11.3% of LGBT employees of color and 6.5% of white LGBT employees, reported being fired or not hired because of their sexual orientation or gender identity. 29.0% of LGBT employees of color said they were not hired because of their LGBT status, compared to 18.3% of white LGBT employees. Over half of LGBT employees who experienced discrimination or harassment at work (57.0%) said their boss or coworkers did or said something that indicated the unfair treatment was motivated by religious beliefs. In comparison to 49.4% of white LGBT employees, nearly two-thirds (63.5%) of LGBT employees of color said religion was a motivating factor in their workplace discrimination experiences.

Despite widespread discrimination, another study has reported that only 71% of American adults think that sexual orientation is a protected characteristic under employment nondiscrimination laws. Sexual minorities are as uninformed as heterosexual individuals that sexual orientation is legally protected from employment discrimination.

== Impact of COVID-19 on LGBTQ employment discrimination ==
LGBTQ people have been adversely affected by both the COVID-19 pandemic and the social-economic chaos. According to research by the Movement Advancement Project, LGBTQ people, particularly people of color and those who are raising children, experience high rates of economic instability and are more likely to face discrimination at work and during job search as well. In comparison to 45% of non-LGBTQ people, 64% of LGBTQ people said they or an adult in their household had lost their job. This is especially concerning because LGBTQ people face higher rates of employment discrimination in general and may have difficulty finding new jobs, this number rises to 71% among Latino LGBTQ households. According to a survey conducted by HRC and PSB in April/May 2020, one-third (33%) of LGBTQ people reduced their hours of work, whereas higher rates for LGBTQ people of color (38%).

In light of employment discrimination against LGBTQ people, the Biden administration strengthened laws prohibiting sex discrimination based on gender identity and sexual orientation. Also, in consultation with the attorney general, the heads of the respective agencies must ensure that existing policies are being followed and develop a plan to combat workplace discrimination.

== See also ==
- Equality Act (United States)
- LGBTQ rights by country or territory
- Employment discrimination law in the United States

== Sources ==
- Ann E. Tweedy and Karen Yescavage, Employment Discrimination Against Bisexuals: An Empirical Study, 21 Wm. & Mary J. Women & L. 699 (2015)
