= Smith v City Of Salem, Ohio =

Smith v. City of Salem, 378 F.3d 566 (6th Cir. 2004), is a employment discrimination case where the Sixth Circuit Court of Appeals held that an employer cannot discriminate against transgender people based on sex stereotyping under Title VII and the precedent of Price Waterhouse v. Hopkins. This landmark decision was the first time that Title VII was used to protect transgender employee rights. Jimmie Smith, a fire lieutenant, was diagnosed with a gender identity disorder where when his fire department upon learning of his disorder conspired to have him terminated.

== Background ==
Jimmie L. Smith was a fire department lieutenant employed with the City of Salem who had been serving for seven years with no problematic incidents on his record. He was biologically a male by birth and had been diagnosed with Gender Identity Disorder. Smith had begun to show a feminine appearance at work often. Coworkers began commenting that his appearance was not "masculine enough." After this, Smith went to his supervisor Thomas Eastek and explained his Gender Identity Disorder diagnosis.

Eastek went to Walter Greenamyer the city's Fire Chief about Smith's diagnosis and went to the law director of Salem Brooke Zellers and the mayor of Salem Larry DeJane in order to find a way to terminate Smith based on his Diagnosis. During the meeting a plan was formed to force Smith to take three psychological evaluations with physicians that the city could choose. Smith was notified of this meeting before a plan was handed to him and Smith got legal counsel and on April 20, 2001 his counsel notified DeJane's office to advise him on Smiths legal representation and possible legal issues the city may face if they go through with the plan made by Zellers, Greenamyer and DeJane went through. Smith would receive a right to sue letter on April 22, 2001 from the Equal Employment Opportunity Commission. On April 26 Greenamyer would suspend Smith for one twenty-four hour shift alleging that he broke a City or Fire Department policy.

A later hearing before the Salem Civil Service Commission about Smith's Suspension, Smith argued that his suspension was retaliation and was based on Smith getting legal council regarding the plan to terminate his employment. The Commission continued to uphold Smith's suspension after the meeting. Smith would appeal to the Columbiana County of Courts of Common Pleas where that decision would be reversed and the suspension lifted.

Smith would then file suit where he would argue claims of sex discrimination under Title VII and retaliation as well as claims regarding to 42 U.S.C. § 1983 and claims of state law violations regarding invasion of privacy and civil conspiracy.

== Judgment ==
=== U.S. District Court for the Northern District of Ohio ===
In Smith's lawsuit against the City of Salem the U.S. District Court for the Northern District of Ohio on February 26, 2003 dismissed all claims against the city finding that there was no violation of Title VII or 42 U.S.C. § 1983 as well as the claims of invasion of privacy and civil conspiracy. Smith would then appeal this decision up to the Sixth Circuit Court of Appeals.

=== Sixth Circuit Court of Appeals ===
On August 5, 2004 the United States Sixth Circuit Court of Appeals in an opinion authored by Judge R. Guy Cole Jr. would reach their decision and found that the U.S. District Court for the Northern District of Ohio was wrong in their verdict. The Sixth Circuit overturned the lower courts decision finding a successful claims to Title VII violations and 42 U.S.C. § 1983 using the precedent set by Price Waterhouse v. Hopkins. Finding that under Title VII there are protections for women who face discrimination based on not meeting stereotypical gender roles. As per their ruling the case was remanded case back to the district court to continue with proceedings consistent with the Six Circuits' opinion.

=== Significance ===
This decision marks the first time that Title VII of the Civil Rights Act of 1964 was used to protect transgender rights in the workplace. The precedent set in this case has been used in other cases such as Glenn v. Brumby to make more recent decisions on transgender rights in the workplace and how Title VII protections would apply in those cases.
