= Shonia Brown =

American novelist

- Born: July 12, 1969 (age 57); Atlanta, Georgia, U.S.
- Occupation: Author

Shonia Brown (born July 12, 1969) is an American author and an independent book publisher.

== Biography ==
Brown was born and raised in Atlanta, Georgia, where she currently resides with her partner. Brown is involved with the gay community and was co-creator, with Betty Couvertier, of the annual Rock, Rhythm, and Rhyme Artist Explosion, a concert of independent singers, bands, poets, and dancers that has taken place during the Atlanta Pride festival since 2003. She was named the female grand marshal of the 2008 Atlanta Pride Festival.

Brown wrote and published her first novel, A Deeper Love, in 2002. Her writings have appeared in the anthology Ma-Ka Diasporic Juks: Contemporary Writing by Queers of African Descent, among other publications. She founded and maintained an arts and entertainment, technology company designed to market and promote emerging artists. In 2007, Brown released the first anthology in her Nghosi Books New Voices Series, Longing, Lust and Love: Black Lesbian Stories, a collection of African-American lesbian erotica under her Nghosi Books imprint.

Currently, Brown is creating a new project that promotes women in technology (GirlyGeek.biz) through an online portfolio, networking community, and training courses/seminars.

== Awards and recognition ==
In 2005, Brown was awarded the Community Builder Award from the Atlanta Pride Committee. In 2008, she received recognition from the National Black Justice Coalition through their annual Black LGBTIQ History Month campaign as an example of an accomplished Black LGBTIQ individual.
