= Occupational sexism =

Discrimination based on the sex in a place of employment

Countries where gender discrimination in hiring is illegal

Occupational sexism (also called sexism in the workplace and employment sexism) is discrimination based on a person's sex that occurs in a place of employment.

== Social role theory ==
Social role theory may explain one reason for why occupational sexism exists. Historically women's place was in the home, while the males were in the workforce. This division consequently formed expectations for both men and women in society and occupations. These expectations, in turn, gave rise to gender stereotypes that play a role in the formation of sexism in the work place, i.e., occupational sexism.

According to a reference, there are three common patterns associated with social role theory that might help explain the relationship between the theory and occupational sexism. The three patterns are as follows:

1. Women tend to take on more domestic tasks;
2. Women and men often have different occupational roles; and as well as pay gap
3. In occupations, women often have lower status

These patterns can work as the foreground for the commonality of occupational stereotypes.

An example

One example of this in action is the expectancy value model. This model describes how expectancies may be linked to gender discrimination in occupations. For example, women are expected by society to be more successful in health-related fields while men are expected to be more successful in science-related fields. Therefore, men are discriminated against when attempting to enter health-related fields, and women are discriminated against when attempting to enter science-related fields.

== Social role theory effects ==
=== History ===
Occupational sexism is caused by the social role theory and different stereotypes in society. The social role theory has many effects on women, many of them pertaining to occupations. Before World War II, women were usually found in the home, performing traditionally womanly duties such as cooking, cleaning, and taking care of children. However, since World War II, women have shifted the gender roles and have begun performing the jobs that men would have typically been performing, such as joining the military, becoming mechanics, driving trucks, etc. The original occupations women participated in were based on the social role theory, but women have been attempting to counteract the theory by participating in jobs that would be seen as "unusual" for them.

=== Stereotypes ===
Despite multiple acts attempting to seal the gap between women and men in the workplace, women still face issues based on stereotypes embedded in society caused by the social role theory. Whether it is intentional or not, there is discrimination of women based on gender-related stereotypes. It has been studied by Tiina Likki, who is a part of a Behavioral Insights Team, that removing stereotypes about women in occupations is difficult because, despite job training, people still acquire stereotypical thoughts. Many stereotypes are embedded into our lives through society, which causes a constant continuation. This makes it difficult to steer away from these stereotypes as they have been prominent in society for hundreds of years.

=== Continuation of Sexism ===
The place where women choose to live and work determines the sexism that is encountered.

=== Trouble Advancing in Occupations ===
In occupations, women rarely are awarded managerial positions. This is caused by sexual roles within organizations. Men are viewed as superior in occupations because of the stereotype that they are stronger and more capable of dealing with their emotions than women. This is a possible reason for why women have trouble obtaining positions in occupations that put them above men. If women were to rise to a higher position in an occupation, there is likelihood that they will be treated differently than if a male were to obtain that same position.

=== Fights against the theory ===
The idea of gender roles has caused different reactions in women in modern society as well. Women have been fighting against gender roles and the stereotype that women can only perform certain duties in occupations. There is an entire feminist movement that focuses on the inequality of women in different aspects of society, including the treatment of women in occupations based on gender roles. Feminists have been working towards gaining equality between men and women and eliminating the social role theory, along with stereotypical assumptions, to ensure women obtain and keep their basic human rights.

== Emotion politics ==
Sexism also arises in the workplace through the beliefs concerning which emotions are appropriate for employees to show. Stereotypically, women are expected to be kind and nurturing, communal, and modest, while they are not expected to display anger. Expressing an emotion that doesn't line up with people's beliefs about gender-appropriate behavior could lead to being given a lower status at work, and consequently, a lower wage.

A 2008 study found that men who expressed anger in the workplace were given a higher status, while women who expressed anger in the workplace were given a lower status, regardless of their actual position in the company. A trainee and a CEO who were female were both given a low status when displaying anger. Additionally, women who displayed anger in the workplace were assumed to have something internal influencing their anger, as opposed to having an external reason to be angry. Men more often had their anger attributed to an external cause.

The expression of anger is believed to be related to status, as anger is considered a status emotion. Positive impressions of those who display anger are reserved for people who are stereotypically conferred a higher status. A 2007 study found that male employees who were in a subordinate position in the workplace displayed anger toward higher status employees, while female employees in a subordinate position displayed anger toward higher status employees much less frequently. This suggests that the stereotypical norm of men displaying anger carries over into the workplace, while the norm of women restraining displays of anger also carries over. It also suggests that, although men in low level positions in the workplace possess a low status in this context, they may carry over the higher status that comes with their gender into the workplace. Women do not possess this high status; therefore the low status that low-level women possess in the workplace is the sole status that matters.

== Some markers ==
- Wage discrimination
- Systematic sex-based hiring and promotional practices (when employers do not hire or promote a person who is "otherwise apparently qualified for a job" solely on the grounds that they are a woman or man)
- Sexual harassment
- The belief that certain occupational fields or types of jobs, particularly those that are degrading and/or low-paying, are "women's work" or those that are dangerous and/or hazardous are "men's work"
- Occupational fatalities
- Disparity in retirement age (men work longer than women)

== Research ==
Discrimination against men in the workplace is underinvestigated. OECD reports often include effects against women, but not for men.

== Wage discrimination ==
Howard J. Wall, an economist for the Federal Reserve Bank of St. Louis, states that women make a median hourly income that was equal to 83.8 percent of what men make. In the late 1980s, studies saw that about a fair amount of the gender pay gap was due to differences in the skills and experience that women bring to the labor market and about 28 percent was due to differences in industry, occupation, and union status among men and women. Accounting for these differences raised the female/male pay ratio in the late 1980s from about 72% to about 88%, leaving around 12 percent as an "unexplained" difference.

== Death at work ==
The majority of occupational deaths occur among men. In one US study, 93% of deaths on the job involved men, with a death rate approximately 11 times higher than women. The industries with the highest death rates are mining, agriculture, forestry, fishing, and construction, all of which employ more men than women. Deaths of members in the military is currently above 90% men.

== Causes of wage discrimination ==
Sociologists, economists, and politicians have proposed several theories about the causes of gender wage gap. Some believe that woman's salaries are based on the career path that women choose. They stipulate that the women chose low-paying jobs, clerical work, and to work in services (see also Pink-collar worker). This is said to be relatively true at time because many women who select these careers find it easier to continue working these simple jobs rather that quit them if they choose to raise a family.

== Sexism in academia ==
Universities have been blamed for being sexist in their hiring decisions. In particular, men have been reported to be biased towards male applicants. However, recent data suggest that women have caught up, at least when it comes to the number of faculty positions offered to women (see Table).

Field	% of applicants	% of applicants interviewed	% of applicants offered position
Physics	12	19	20
Biology	26	28	34
Chemistry	18	25	29
Mathematics	20	28	32

Data in table from 89 US universities where women were interviewed for tenure-track jobs.

== Challenging occupational sexism ==
Occupational sexism become institutionalized in the U.S. today when women were originally able to join the workforce by men primarily in the 20th century and were paid up to two-thirds of what male's income were. Since then it is now thought of as "good business" to hire women because they could perform many jobs similar to men, yet give them lesser wages. Groups like the American Civil Liberties Union and the National Organization for Women are established to fight against this discrimination, leading to the creation of groundbreaking laws such as the Equal Pay Act of 1963. However, identifying and challenging sex discrimination in the workplace (on legal grounds) has been argued as being extremely difficult for the average person to attempt and even harder to prove in court.

One successful sexism case that reached the U.S. Supreme Court was Price Waterhouse v. Hopkins. Ann Hopkins, a senior manager at Price Waterhouse, sued her employer, arguing that failure to promote her to partner stemmed not from her abilities—which had been undeniably stellar—but from certain partners thinking she didn't carry herself in a feminine-enough manner. The Supreme Court ruled 6–3 in Hopkins' favor, and a lower court ordered her employer to award her partnership and pay her back wages lost during the case.

Another Supreme Court case, Ledbetter v. Goodyear Tire & Rubber Co., saw a judgment in favor of plaintiff Lilly Ledbetter—which had awarded her back pay and damages for several years of receiving disproportionately low pay in comparison to her male counterparts—overturned because she waited too long to file suit. After a 5–4 decision, the majority cited reasoning that "Federal law states that 'employees must file their discrimination complaints within 180 days of the incident,'" a task that dissenting Justice Ruth Bader Ginsburg claimed was unreasonable considering that quite often women have no reason to suspect discrimination until certain unfair patterns develop and they are made aware of them.

== See also ==
- Motherhood penalty
- Occupational segregation
- Queen bee syndrome
- Gender bias in medical diagnosis
