= Atlanta Gay Men's Chorus =

Gay men's chorus in Atlanta, Georgia, US

Background information
- Also known as: AGMC
- Origin: Atlanta, Georgia, United States
- Genres: Choral, Broadway, classical, jazz, popular
- Occupation: Men's chorus
- Instrument: 168 voices
- Years active: 1981–present
- Member of: GALA Choruses - https://galachoruses.org/
- Members: Artistic Director; Donald Milton, III; Chairman-Board of Directors; Joey Jaworski; Executive Director; David Aurillio; Assistant Conductor; David G. Artadi; Chorus Membership President; Matthew Harrington; Chorus Membership President-Elect; Justin Roth; Principal Accompanist; Patrick Hutchinson
- Website: https://www.voicesofnote.org/atlanta-gay-mens-chorus

The Atlanta Gay Men's Chorus (AGMC) is a nonprofit performing arts organization based in Atlanta, Georgia (US). The AGMC, along with the Atlanta Women's Chorus, are managed under their parent organization, Voices of Note.

The AGMC's traditional concert season includes a Holiday Concert in early December at The Cathedral of St. Phillip in the Buckhead neighborhood of Atlanta, a Spring Concert in late April, and a Summer Concert in June. The AGMC is also a strong presence in the Atlanta LGBTQ Community due to their involvement in various charitable organizations, cultural events and the annual Atlanta Gay Pride Parade.

One of the world's longest-running gay choruses, the AGMC is a member of the international Gay and Lesbian Association of Choruses (GALA), and it actively participates in collaborative performances and educational efforts with GALA member choruses worldwide. The AGMC is also a member of Chorus America, an organization dedicated to the expansion of the choral movement in North America.

== History ==
The AGMC presented its first Holiday Concert, Music of the Season, featuring ten Christmas songs, on November 29, 1981, at Grant Park United Methodist Church.

In 2001, a quartet from the AGMC performed the national anthem at an Atlanta Braves home game, and in 2002, the entire chorus returned to do the same.

In the summer of 2023, a group of about 30 members from the AGMC performed in Bologna, Italy for the Various Voices European Choir Festival, from June 14–18, 2023.

== Artistic directors ==
Donald Milton, III is the AGMC's current Artistic Director.

=== Previous artistic directors ===
- Jeffrey D. McIntyre, Founding Artistic Director, 1981–1984 and 1991–1994, Interim Artistic Director, 2006–2007
- Neil Gregory, 1984–1987
- Richard D. Rechtin, 1988–1990
- David A. Puckett, 1995–1999
- Gary W. Arnold, 1999–2000
- Leslie J. Blackwell, 2000–2006
- Kevin Robison, first Full-Time Artistic Director, 2007–2017

== Discography ==
- The AGMC recorded three tracks for Gerald L. Stacy's CD, In Remembrance of Love, in 1997, including "Commencement" by Shelly Jackson, "Prayer for the Children" by Kurt Bestor, and "Irish Blessing", arranged by Robert Seeley. "Prayer for the Children" was performed by the AGMC's small ensemble, Panache; David A. Puckett, Artistic Director. Recorded and produced by Allgood Productions, Atlanta, Georgia.
- Carols, Revels and Holiday Cheer (1998)—a live recording of the AGMC's 1997 Holiday Concert at the Episcopal Cathedral of Saint Philip; David A. Puckett, Artistic Director. Recorded and produced by DiverseCity Records, Austell, Georgia.
- Passions (2002)—a live recording of the AGMC's 2001 Spring Concert at St. Bartholomew's Episcopal Church; Leslie J. Blackwell, Artistic Director. Recorded and produced by Gil Moor & Bill Brown, Atlanta, Georgia.
- A Real Family Holiday (2004)—a studio recording of music from the AGMC's 2003 Holiday Concert; Dr. Leslie J. Blackwell, Artistic Director. Recorded by Allgood Productions, Atlanta, Georgia; produced by Dr. Leslie J. Blackwell.
- Live at the Cathedral (2004)—a live recording of the AGMC's 2004 Holiday Concert at The Episcopal Cathedral of Saint Philip; Dr. Leslie J. Blackwell, Artistic Director. Recorded and produced by Allgood Productions, Atlanta, Georgia.
- And On Earth, Peace (2012)—a live recording of various selections from the AGMC's Holiday Concerts at the Cathedral of St. Phillip from 2008–2011. Kevin Robison, Artistic Director. Recorded by RM Audio, Atlanta, Georgia.

== Performances ==
1st Concert Season: 1981–1982

- The AGMC's very first public performance, called simply "Sneak Preview", directed by Jeffrey D. McIntyre, was presented on October 18, 1981, at (First) Metropolitan Community Church in Virginia Highland.
- The 1981 Holiday Concert, "Music of the Season", directed by Jeffrey D. McIntyre, was presented on November 29, 1981, at Grant Park United Methodist Church.
- The 1982 Spring Concert, "Southern Knights", directed by Jeffrey D. McIntyre, was presented on May 15, 1982, at the Peachtree Playhouse.

2nd Concert Season: 1982–1983

- The 1982 Holiday Concert, "The Most Wonderful Time of the Year", directed by Jeffrey D. McIntyre, was presented on December 4, 1982, at All Saints' Episcopal Church.
- The 1983 Pride Concert, "United in Song!", directed by Jeffrey D. McIntyre, was presented on June 18, 1983, at St. Luke's Episcopal Church.

3rd Concert Season: 1983–1984

- The 1983 Holiday Concert, "Fanfare for Christmas", directed by Jeffrey D. McIntyre, was presented on December 10, 1983, at St. Luke's Episcopal Church.
- The 1984 Pride Concert, "A Grand Night for Singing", directed by Jeffrey D. McIntyre and a joint performance with the Atlanta Feminist Women's Chorus and the Atlanta Lambda Chorale, was presented on June 23 & 30, 1984, at the Dancers Collective.
- The AGMC, under the direction of Jeffrey D. McIntyre, performed in WSB-TV's "Salute to America" parade in Atlanta on July 4, 1984, and was the first openly gay organization to do so.

4th Concert Season: 1984–1985

- The 1984 Holiday Concert, "Let Us Rejoice Together", directed by Neil Gregory, was presented on December 15, 1984, at St. Luke's Episcopal Church.
- The 1985 Spring Concert, "Spring", directed by Neil Gregory, was presented on April 12 & 14, 1985, at the Walter C. Hill Auditorium of the High Museum of Art.
- The 1985 Pride Concert, "Way Down South of Broadway", directed by Neil Gregory, was presented on June 29, 1985, at the Academy Theater.
- The AGMC, under the direction of Neil Gregory, performed in WSB-TV's "Salute to America" parade in Atlanta on July 4, 1985.

5th Concert Season: 1985–1986

- The 1985 Holiday Concert, "Celebrating the Season", directed by Neil Gregory, was presented on December 14, 1985, at St. Luke's Episcopal Church.
- The 1986 Spring Concert, "Between the Devil and the Deep Blue Sea", directed by Neil Gregory, was presented on April 19, 1986, at the Richard H. Rich Theatre of the Woodruff Arts Center.
- The 1986 Pride Concert, "The Best of AGMC", directed by Neil Gregory, was presented on July 26, 1986, at the Academy Theater.

6th Concert Season: 1986–1987

- The 1986 Holiday Concert, "Throw Up the Sash", directed by Neil Gregory, was presented on December 13, 1986, at St. Luke's Episcopal Church.
- The 1987 Spring Concert, "Red, White and Blues", directed by Neil Gregory, was presented on April 25, 1987, at the Walter C. Hill Auditorium of the High Museum of Art.
- The 1987 Pride Concert, "...When You're Having Fun", directed by Neil Gregory, was presented on July 25, 1987, at the Walter C. Hill Auditorium of the High Museum of Art.

7th Concert Season: 1987–1988

- The 1987 Holiday Concert, "The Stockings Were Hung", directed by Neil Gregory, was presented on December 12, 1987, at St. Luke's Episcopal Church.
- The AGMC, the Gay Men's Chorus of South Florida and the Gay Men's Chorus of Washington, D.C., presented "Brothers in Harmony", a joint performance under the direction Gary E. Keating, on February 20, 1988, at Victory Park Auditorium in North Miami Beach, Florida.
- The 1988 Pride Concert, "That's Entertainment", directed by Richard D. Rechtin, was presented on July 30, 1988, at the Samuel Inman Middle School Auditorium.

8th Concert Season: 1988–1989

- The 1988 Holiday Concert, "A Special Holiday Concert", directed by Richard D. Rechtin, was presented on December 7, 1988, at Onstage Atlanta.
- The 1989 Spring Concert, "Heart Theme", directed by Richard D. Rechtin, was presented on February 18, 1989, at the Walter C. Hill Auditorium of the High Museum of Art.
- The 1989 Pride Concert, "Look to Your Dream", directed by Richard D. Rechtin, was presented on June 10, 1989, at the Walter C. Hill Auditorium of the High Museum of Art.
- The AGMC, under the direction of Richard D. Rechtin, performed at GALA Festival III at the University of Washington in Seattle, Washington, in July 1989.

9th Concert Season: 1989–1990

- The 1989 Holiday Concert, "A Gift of Song", directed by Richard D. Rechtin, was presented on December 2, 1989, at the June Cofer Auditorium at Southside High School.
- The AGMC, under the direction of Richard D. Rechtin, presented "The Gayest Event of the Season" on December 16, 1989, at the War Memorial Auditorium in Nashville, Tennessee.
- The 1990 Pride Concert, "In Harmony and Unity", directed by Richard D. Rechtin and a joint performance with the Atlanta Feminist Women's Chorus, was presented on June 3, 1990, at the June Cofer Auditorium at Southside High School.

10th Concert Season: 1990–1991

- The 1990 Holiday Concert, "Carols, Toys & Sugarplum Fairies!", directed by Jeffrey D. McIntyre, was presented on December 8, 1990, at the June Cofer Auditorium at Southside High School.
- The 1991 Spring Concert, "Spring Break", directed by Richard Ezell, was presented on April 6, 1991, at the June Cofer Auditorium at Southside High School.

11th Concert Season: 1991–1992

- The 1991 Holiday Concert, "Men on Christmas", directed by Jeffrey D. McIntyre, was presented on December 15, 1991, at the 14th Street Playhouse.
- The 1992 Spring Concert, "WGAY Radio", directed by Jeffrey D. McIntyre, was presented on March 29, 1992, at the 14th Street Playhouse.
- The 1992 Pride Concert, "Tenth Anniversary Pride Concert", directed by Jeffrey D. McIntyre, was presented on June 14, 1992, at the Alliance Theatre of the Woodruff Arts Center.
- The AGMC, under the direction of Jeffrey D. McIntyre, performed at GALA Festival IV in Denver, Colorado, in the summer of 1992.

12th Concert Season: 1992–1993

- The 1992 Holiday Concert, "Home for the Holiday?", directed by Jeffrey D. McIntyre, was presented on December 19, 1992, at Henry Grady High School.
- The 1993 Spring Concert, "Homecoming Hop", directed by Jeffrey D. McIntyre, was presented on March 26, 1993, at Henry Grady High School.
- The 1993 Pride Concert, "Made in the USA: Homegrown Music", directed by Jeffrey D. McIntyre and a joint performance with One Voice from Charlotte, North Carolina, was presented on June 12, 1993, at Henry Grady High School.

13th Concert Season: 1993–1994

- The 1993 Holiday Concert, "Carols of Splendor", directed by Jeffrey D. McIntyre, was presented on December 17 & 18, 1993, at the William R. Cannon Chapel at Emory University.
- The 1994 Spring Concert, "An Evening with... Lenny, George, Steve & Fats", directed by Jeffrey D. McIntyre, was presented on March 25, 1994, at Henry Grady High School.
- The 1994 Pride Concert, "When We No Longer Touch", directed by Jeffrey D. McIntyre and a joint performance with the Gateway Men's Chorus of St. Louis, Missouri, was presented on June 18, 1994, at the Robert Ferst Center for the Arts at Georgia Tech.

14th Concert Season: 1994–1995

- The 1994 Holiday Concert, "Christmas with Spirit", directed by Jeffrey D. McIntyre, was presented on December 16 & 17, 1994, at the William R. Cannon Chapel at Emory University.
- The 1995 Spring Concert, "Songs from the Heart", directed by Leslie J. Blackwell, was presented on April 8, 1995, at the Glenn Memorial Auditorium at Emory University.
- The 1995 Pride Concert, "WGAY Radio: Tune In Again!", directed by David A. Puckett, was presented on June 24, 1995, at the Robert Ferst Center for the Arts at Georgia Tech.

15th Concert Season: 1995–1996

- The 1995 Holiday Concert, "Masters in This Hall", directed by David A. Puckett, was presented on December 8 & 9, 1995, at St. Luke's Episcopal Church.
- The 1996 Spring Concert, "Memento mori: an AIDS requiem", featuring the world premiere of the AGMC's first major commissioned work by James Adler, directed by David A. Puckett, was presented on April 13 & 14, 1996, at Glenn Memorial Auditorium at Emory University.
- The 1996 Pride Concert, "The Atlanta Flames", directed by David A. Puckett and a joint performance with Le Choeur International Gai de Paris, France, was presented on June 29, 1996, at the Atlanta Civic Center.
- The AGMC, under the direction of David A. Puckett, performed at GALA Festival V in Tampa, Florida, in July 1996.

16th Concert Season: 1996–1997

- The 1996 Holiday Concert, "Fa La La La La...", directed by David A. Puckett, was presented on December 13 & 14, 1996, at the Episcopal Cathedral of Saint Philip. This was the Atlanta Gay Men's Chorus first time performing at the Cathedral.
- The 1997 Spring Concert, "United We Stand", directed by David A. Puckett and a joint performance with the Atlanta Feminist Women's Chorus, was presented on April 11 & 12, 1997, at the Rialto Center for the Performing Arts.
- The AGMC, under the direction of David A. Puckett, recorded three songs in studio for Gerald L. Stacy's CD, "In Remembrance of Love", in May 1997. The CD was released later that year.
- The 1997 Pride Concert, "Are We in Kansas Yet?", directed by David A. Puckett, was presented on June 28, 1997, at the Fabulous Fox Theatre.

17th Concert Season: 1997–1998

- The 1997 Holiday Concert, "Carols, Revels and Holiday Cheer", directed by David A. Puckett, was presented on December 11, 12 & 13, 1997, at the Episcopal Cathedral of Saint Philip. "Carols, Revels and Holiday Cheer" was subsequently released as the AGMC's first commercially available CD.
- The 1998 Spring Concert, "Songs of Freedom and Celebration with Maya Angelou", directed by David A. Puckett, was presented on March 3 & 4, 1998, at the Fabulous Fox Theatre.
- The 1998 Pride Concert, "Decades of Divas", directed by David A. Puckett, was presented on June 27, 1998, at the Atlanta Civic Center.

18th Concert Season: 1998–1999

- The 1998 Holiday Concert, "Simply... Peace", directed by David A. Puckett, was presented on December 17, 18 & 19, 1998, at the Episcopal Cathedral of Saint Philip.
- The 1999 Spring Concert, "The Gay '90s", directed by David A. Puckett, was presented on March 19 & 20, 1999, at the Rialto Center for the Performing Arts.
- The 1999 Pride Concert, "S'wellegant Elegance", directed by Gary W. Arnold and a joint performance with the Gay Men's Chorus of Washington, D.C., was presented on June 19, 1999, at the Atlanta Symphony Hall at the Woodruff Arts Center.

19th Concert Season: 1999–2000

- The 1999 Holiday Concert, "A Family of Lights", directed by Gary W. Arnold, was presented on December 10 & 11, 1999, at the Episcopal Cathedral of Saint Philip.
- The 2000 Spring Concert, "Cameras, Postcards & Places to Be", directed by Gary W. Arnold, was presented on March 25, 2000, at the Robert Ferst Center for the Arts at Georgia Tech.
- The 2000 Pride Concert, "Celluloid, Footlights & Videotape", directed by Gary W. Arnold, was presented on June 17, 2000, at the Rialto Center for the Performing Arts.
- The AGMC, under the direction of Leslie J. Blackwell, performed at GALA Festival 2000 in San Jose, California, in July 2000.

20th Concert Season: 2000–2001

- The 2000 Holiday Concert, "Adeste Fideles", directed by Leslie J. Blackwell, was presented on December 8 & 9, 2000, at the Episcopal Cathedral of Saint Philip.
- The 2001 Spring Concert, "Passions", directed by Leslie J. Blackwell, was presented on March 31, 2001, at Saint Bartholomew's Episcopal Church. "Passions" was subsequently released as the AGMC's second commercially available CD.
- The 2001 Pride Concert, "Harmonic Convergence", directed by Leslie J. Blackwell and a joint performance with the Atlanta Feminist Women's Chorus, was presented on June 23, 2001, at the Atlanta Symphony Hall at the Woodruff Arts Center.
- A quartet representing the AGMC, under the direction of Leslie J. Blackwell, performed the national anthem before an Atlanta Braves home game at Turner Field on August 8, 2001.

21st Concert Season: 2001–2002

- The 2001 Holiday Concert, "An Evening at St. Philip's", directed by Leslie J. Blackwell, was presented on December 14 & 15, 2001, at the Episcopal Cathedral of Saint Philip.
- The AGMC, under the direction of Leslie J. Blackwell, performed at the post-inaugural reception for newly elected Atlanta Mayor Shirley Franklin at the Atlanta Civic Center on January 7, 2002.
- The 2002 Spring Concert, "Of Men & Music", directed by Leslie J. Blackwell, was presented on April 6, 2002, at Saint Bartholomew's Episcopal Church.
- The AGMC, under the direction of Leslie J. Blackwell, performed the national anthem before a home game between the Atlanta Braves and the New York Mets at Turner Field on June 5, 2002.
- The 2002 Pride Concert, "WGAY Radio Theatre", directed by Leslie J. Blackwell, was presented on June 22, 2002, at Earthlink Live.

22nd Concert Season: 2002–2003

- The 2002 Holiday Concert, "Spirit of Lights", directed by Leslie J. Blackwell, was presented on December 12, 13 & 14, 2002, at the Episcopal Cathedral of Saint Philip.
- The AGMC, under the direction of Leslie J. Blackwell, presented "Brothers in Song", a joint performance with Turtle Creek Chorale, on January 25, 2003, at the Robert Ferst Center for the Arts at Georgia Tech.
- The 2003 Spring Concert, "Livin' La Dulce Vita", directed by Leslie J. Blackwell, was presented on April 5, 2003, at the Robert Ferst Center for the Arts at Georgia Tech.
- The 2003 Pride Concert, "Babes in Boyland", directed by Leslie J. Blackwell, was presented on June 20 & 21, 2003, at the Robert Ferst Center for the Arts at Georgia Tech.

23rd Concert Season: 2003–2004

- The 2003 Holiday Concert, "A Real Family Holiday", directed by Leslie J. Blackwell, was presented on December 12 & 13, 2003, at the Episcopal Cathedral of Saint Philip. "A Real Family Holiday" was subsequently released as the AGMC's third commercially available CD.
- The 2004 Spring Concert, "Spirited Away", directed by Leslie J. Blackwell, was presented on April 3, 2004, at the Robert Ferst Center for the Arts at Georgia Tech.
- The 2004 Pride Concert, "Reel Men", directed by Leslie J. Blackwell, was presented on June 18 & 19, 2004, at the Robert Ferst Center for the Arts at Georgia Tech.
- The AGMC, under the direction of Leslie J. Blackwell, performed at the 2004 GALA Festival in Montreal, Québec, in July 2004.

24th Concert Season: 2004–2005

- The 2004 Holiday Concert, "Home for the Holidays", directed by Leslie J. Blackwell, was presented on December 10 & 11, 2004, at the Episcopal Cathedral of Saint Philip.
- The 2005 Spring Concert, "One World", directed by Leslie J. Blackwell, was presented on April 2, 2005, at the Robert Ferst Center for the Arts at Georgia Tech.
- The 2005 Pride Concert, "Babes in Boyland 2", directed by Leslie J. Blackwell, was presented on June 17 & 18, 2005, at the Robert Ferst Center for the Arts at Georgia Tech.

25th Concert Season: 2005–2006

- The 2005 Holiday Concert, "Candlelight at the Cathedral", directed by Leslie J. Blackwell, was presented on December 9 & 10, 2005, at the Episcopal Cathedral of Saint Philip. "Candlelight at the Cathedral" was subsequently released as the AGMC's fourth commercially available CD.
- The 2006 Spring Concert, "The Best of Times", directed by Leslie J. Blackwell, was presented on April 1, 2006, at the Robert Ferst Center for the Arts at Georgia Tech.
- "Still Blazing After All These Years," subtitled "Sisters & Brothers In Song", was performed on May 6, 2006. This special concert commemorated the 25th Season of the Atlanta Feminist Women's Chorus and the Atlanta Gay Men's Chorus. Panache and the AFWC performed at The First Metropolitan Community Church.
- The 2006 Pride Concert, "Beyond the Yellow Brick Road", directed by Jeffrey D. McIntyre, was presented on June 16 & 17, 2006, at the Robert Ferst Center for the Arts at Georgia Tech.

26th Concert Season: 2006–2007

- The 2006 Holiday Concert, "Wrapped in Light", directed by Jeffrey D. McIntyre, was presented on December 8 & 9, 2006, at the Episcopal Cathedral of Saint Philip.
- The 2007 Spring Concert, "Liberty: Songs of Protest and Awakening", directed by Jeffrey D. McIntyre, was presented on March 23 & 24, 2007, at St. Bartholomew's Episcopal Church.
- The 2007 Pride Concert, "Let's Misbehave!", directed by Robert Glor, was presented on June 16, 2007, at Presser Hall at Agnes Scott College.

27th Concert Season: 2007–2008

- The 2007 Holiday Concert, "Bells, Brass and Beyond", directed by Kevin Robison, was presented on December 7 & 8, 2007, at the Episcopal Cathedral of Saint Philip.
- The 2008 Spring Concert, "Divas & Dilemmas: Opera OUR Way", directed by Kevin Robison, was presented on March 29, 2008, at the Cobb Energy Performing Arts Centre.
- The 2008 Summer Concert, "They Had It Coming: The Music of Kander & Ebb", directed by Kevin Robison, was presented June 27 & 28, 2008, at the Alliance Theatre at the Woodruff Arts Center.
- Eighty members of the AGMC, under the direction of Kevin Robison, performed in the Knight Concert Hall in Miami, Florida, on July 15, 2008, during the weeklong GALA Choruses Festival 8.

28th Concert Season: 2008–2009

- The 2008 Holiday Concert, "All Spruced Up, and Know Where to Go", directed by Kevin Robison, presented on December 7, 2008, at the Bailey Performance Center at Kennesaw State University in Kennesaw, Georgia, and on December 12 & 13, 2008, was presented at the Episcopal Cathedral of Saint Philip.
- The 2009 Spring Concert, "Shaken, Not Heard: Stories of Gay Men, Faith and Reconciliation", directed by Kevin Robison, presented in April 24-26, 2009 at the historic Oakhurst Baptist Church in Decatur, GA.
- The 2009 Summer Concert, "Lush Life: The Music of Billy Strayhorn", directed by Kevin Robison, in partnership with the National Black Arts Festival, and featuring Jazz Orchestra Atlanta. Presented on July 1, 2009 in Symphony Hall at the Woodruff Arts Center, with special guests Donzaleigh Abernathy, John Wesley Wright, and Larry Strayhorn.

29th Concert Season: 2009–2010

- The 2009 Holiday Concert, "December Detours", directed by Kevin Robison, presented on December 11 & 12, 2009, at the Episcopal Cathedral of Saint Philip.
- The 2010 Spring Concert, "The Road Leads Back: Georgia on Our Minds" tour, directed by Kevin Robison, presented Spring of 2010. The tour went through Macon, Georgia (March 19), Savannah, Georgia (March 20), Augusta, Georgia (March 21), Athens, Georgia (March 25) and ended in Atlanta, Georgia on March 26 & 27 at Virginia Highlands Baptist.
- The 2010 Summer Concert, "All You Need is Love: The Music of the Beatles", directed by Kevin Robison, presented on July 9 & 10, 2010, at the Rialto Center for the Arts.

30th Concert Season: 2010–2011

- The 2010 Holiday Concert, "Holiday Lights", directed by Kevin Robison, presented on December 10 & 11, 2010, at the Episcopal Cathedral of Saint Philip.
- The 2011 Spring Concert, "Divas 2: Opera Revisited", directed by Kevin Robison, presented on April 29 & 30, 2011, at the Conant Performing Arts Center at Oglethorpe University.
- "Panache in Concert", the small ensemble from the Atlanta Gay Men's Chorus, presented this one-night only performance on Saturday, May 14, 2011 at Cannon Chapel - Emory University.
- The 2011 Summer Concert, "Thirty Years of Broadway", directed by Kevin Robison, presented on July 8 & 9, 2011, at the Rialto Center for the Arts.

31st Concert Season: 2011–2012

- The 2011 Holiday Concert, "Bells in Boyland" featuring the Atlanta Concert Ringers, directed by Kevin Robison, presented on December 9 & 10, 2011, at the Episcopal Cathedral of Saint Philip.
- The 2012 Spring Concert, "Gleeful Noise: Celebrating Glee Clubs Then & Now", directed by Kevin Robison, presented on March 30 & 31, 2012, at the Cannon Chapel at Emory University.
- The 2012 Summer Concert, "Red, White & You: United We Stand", directed by Kevin Robison, presented on June 15 & 16, 2012, at the Glenn Memorial Auditorium at Emory University - Decatur.
- GALA 2012 Choral Festival, directed by Kevin Robison, presented July 7–11, 2012, in Denver, Colorado.

32nd Concert Season: 2012–2013

- The 2012 Holiday Concert, "And On Earth, Peace", directed by Kevin Robison, presented on December 7 & 8, 2012, at the Episcopal Cathedral of Saint Philip.
- The 2013 Spring Concert, "No Rest for the WICKED: The Music of Stephen Schwartz", directed by Kevin Robison, presented on April 19 & 20, 2013, at the 14th Street Playhouse. This concert also was the debut performance of the AGMC Women's Chorus Project.
- The 2013 Summer Concert, "Singing Out Proud" premiered "I am Harvey Milk" by Andrew Lippa, directed by Kevin Robison, presented on June 28 & 29, 2013, at the Glenn Memorial Auditorium at Emory University - Decatur.

33rd Concert Season: 2013–2014

- The 2013 Holiday Concert, "Seasons of Family", directed by Kevin Robison, presented on December 6 & 7, 2013, at the Episcopal Cathedral of Saint Philip. Featuring the performance by the Atlanta Women's Chorus (formerly the AGMC Women's Chorus Project).
- The 2014 Spring Concert, the premiere of "When I Was Your Age: Sons of Our Fathers", written and produced by the AGMC, directed by Kevin Robison, presented on March 27–30, 2014, at the Fabrefaction Theatre.
- The 2014 Summer Concert, "CHER Determination", directed by Kevin Robison, presented on June 27 & 28, 2014, at the Rialto Center for the Arts.

34th Concert Season: 2014–2015

- The 2014 Holiday Concert, "Tied up With Strings", directed by Kevin Robison, presented on December 5 & 6, 2014, at the Episcopal Cathedral of Saint Philip.
- The 2015 Spring Concert, "UnSUNG Heroes" featuring singer Matt Alber, directed by Kevin Robison, presented on March 27 & 28, 2015, at Druid Hills Methodist.
- The 2015 Summer Concert, "Men in the Mirror", directed by Kevin Robison, presented on June 26 & 27, 2015, at Druid Hills Presbyterian.

35th Concert Season: 2015–2016

- The 2015 Holiday Concert, "Deck the Halls", directed by Kevin Robison, presented on December 4 & 5, 2015, at the Episcopal Cathedral of Saint Philip.
- The 2016 Spring Concert, "And Justice for All" including a world premiere of "Libertad" by Kevin Robison, directed by Kevin Robison & Dr. Melissa Arasi, presented on March 18 & 19, 2016, at Peachtree Road United Methodist Church. This concert was presented by the Atlanta Gay Mens Chorus and the Atlanta Women's Chorus.
- The 2016 Summer Concert, "The Story of Us" featuring the "When I Was Your Age" performance from 2014, directed by Kevin Robison, presented on June 24 & 25, 2016, at Druid Hills Presbyterian.
- GALA 2016 Choral Festival, "When I Was Your Age", directed by Kevin Robison, production by Christopher Repotski, presented on July 3, 2016, at the Ellie Caulkins Opera House in Denver, Colorado.

36th Concert Season: 2016–2017

- The 2016 Holiday Concert, "Comfort & Joy", directed by Kevin Robison, presented on December 2 & 3, 2016, at the Episcopal Cathedral of Saint Philip.
- The 2017 Spring Concert, Two Boys Kissing" from composer Joshua Shank, directed by Kevin Robison, presented on March 31 & April 1, 2017, at Druid Hills Presbyterian.
- The 2017 Summer Concert, "Revolution: The Music of the Beatles", directed by Kevin Robison, presented on June 30 & July 1, 2017, at the Rialto Center for the Arts.

37th Concert Season: 2017–2018

- The 2017 Holiday Concert, "Bells, Babs, & Beyond", directed by Kevin Robison, presented on December 8 & 9, 2017, at the Episcopal Cathedral of Saint Philip.
- The 2018 Spring Concert, "Midnight Train to Georgia", directed by Donald Milton III, presented on March 30 & 31, 2018, at Out Front Theatre.
- The 2018 Summer Concert, Broadway & Peachtree", directed by Donald Milton III, presented on June 29 & 30, 2018, at Out Front Theatre.

38th Concert Season: 2018–2019

- The 2018 Holiday Concert, "Holly, Jolly and Gay!", directed by Donald Milton III, presented on December 7 & 8, 2018, at the Episcopal Cathedral of Saint Philip.
- The 2019 Spring Concert, "Sound Off", directed by Donald Milton III, presented on April 5 & 7, 2019, at Atlanta City Hall.
- The Roger Smith Memorial Concert, AGMC performs their Stonewall Concert, directed by Donald Milton III, presented on June 15, 2019, at Trinity Presbyterian Church in Hendersonville, NC. This was part of Hendersonville's Pride Week.
- The 2019 Summer Concert, "I see You: 50 Years After Stonewall", directed by Donald Milton III, presented on June 22, 2019, at St. Luke's Episcopal Church.

39th Concert Season: 2019–2020

- The 2019 Holiday Concert, directed by Donald Milton III, presented on December 6 & 7, 2019, at the Episcopal Cathedral of Saint Philip.
- A special performance with Yacht Rock Schooner, "The Best Damn Queen Show Ever", presented on February 14, 2020, at the Variety Playhouse.
- The 2020 Spring Concert, "Queens & Queen", directed by Donald Milton III, presented on March 7, 2020, at Lassiter Concert Hall.
- The 2020 Summer Concert (Virtual Concert), "A Couch Cabaret", hosted by Donald Milton III, and the Atlanta Women's Chorus Artistic Director, Dr. Melissa Arasi, presented on May 21, 2020.

40th Concert Season: 2020–2021

- The 2020 40th Holiday Concert (Virtual Concert), "25 Years at the Cathedral", directed by Donald Milton III, presented on December 4 & 5, 2020, at the Episcopal Cathedral of Saint Philip.
- The 2021 Spring Concert (Virtual Concert), "Never Turning Back", directed by Donald Milton III and the Atlanta Women's Chorus Artistic Director, Dr. Melissa Arasi, presented on April 9 & 10, 2021. This was a combined concert with the Atlanta Women's Chorus.
- The 2021 Summer Concert, "Yaaaaaas Broadway" (Virtual Concert), directed by Donald Milton III, presented on June 18 & 19, 2021.

41st Concert Season: 2021–2022

- The 2021 41st Holiday Concert, "40th Anniversary Holiday Concert", directed by Donald Milton III, presented on December 3 & 4, 2021, at the Episcopal Cathedral of Saint Philip.
- The 2022 Spring Concert, "Rubyversary", directed by Donald Milton III, presented on April 10, 2022, at the Byers Theater. Hosted by Jorge Estevez with special guest, Broadway star Jessica Vosk. This performance celebrated 40 Years of the Atlanta Gay Men's Chorus, which was delayed due to the COVID-19 outbreak in 2020.
- Strictly Sondheim: In Voices of Note's Annual Fundraiser Cabaret, select members from the AGMC and its sister chorus, the Atlanta Women's Chorus, performed in a broadway style musical review dedicated to the late Stephen Sondheim. Under the direction of Jason Wynn, they performed at Outfront Theatre in Atlanta, Georgia on July 16, 2022.
- The 2022 Fall Concert, the world premiere of Julian Hornik's "QueerZ", directed by Donald Milton III, presented on October 15, 2022, at the Ferst Center for the Arts at Georgia Tech.

42nd Concert Season: 2022–2023

- The 2022 42nd Holiday Concert, directed by Donald Milton III, presented on December 2 & 3, 2022, at the Episcopal Cathedral of Saint Philip.
- The 2023 Spring Concert, a commissioned piece of work titled "Songs of the Phoenix", directed by Donald Milton III, presented on March 25, 2023, at St. Luke's Episcopal Church.
- Strictly Sondheim: Select members from the AGMC and its sister chorus, the Atlanta Women's Chorus, brought back the musical review dedicated to the late Stephen Sondheim. Under the direction of Jason Wynn, they performed at The William Bremen Jewish Heritage Museum in Atlanta, Georgia on May 31, 2023.
- The 2023 Summer Concert, directed by Donald Milton III, presented on June 9, 2023 at Atlanta City Hall, and June 10, 2023 at the Conant Performing Arts Center at Oglethorpe University.
- The 2023 Various Voices Choral Festival: A group of about 30 members from the AGMC performed in Bologna, Italy for the Various Voices European Choir Festival, from June 14–18, 2023. The group performed on June 16, 2023 at the MAMbo - Modern Art Museum of Bologna under the direction of Donald Milton III. They also performed on June 17, 2023, at the Teatro Arena del Sole.
- Everything Old is New Again: In Voices of Note's Annual Fundraiser Cabaret, select members from the AGMC and its sister chorus, the Atlanta Women's Chorus, performed in a broadway style musical review, including iconic material from Broadway hits like “Rent,” “Aida,” Hercules,” “Miss Saigon” and “Godspell.” They hosted two performances on August 14, 2023, at the Aurora Theatre in Lawrenceville, Georgia.

43rd Concert Season: 2023–2024

- The 2023 43rd Holiday Concert, directed by Donald Milton III, presented on December 1 & 2, 2023 at the Episcopal Cathedral of Saint Philip.
- The 2024 Spring Concert, directed by Donald Milton III, "Transformation" was presented on April 6, 2024, at the Byers Theater. "Transformation" was a powerful message of support and hope based on the Trans and Non-Binary experience.
- The Atlanta Gay Men's Chorus took the "Transformation" concert on the road to the Hendersonville, North Carolina for Hendersonville Pride. This was the second time the chorus performed for Hendersonville Pride.
- The 2024 GALA Choruses Festival: After 8 long awaited years the Atlanta Gay Men's Chorus, directed by Donald Milton III, performed on July 11, 2024, at the Orchestra Hall in Minneapolis, Minnesota. Members of the chorus performed a selection of music in a half hour set in front of over 2,000 people. The chorus also performed in a Blockbuster Concert titled "Harmonies of the Sphere". The small group Panache performed as well in the Ensemble Concert Block on July 10th, 2024. This was also the first GALA to Live Stream the entire week of performances online.

44th Concert Season: 2024–2025

- The 2024 44th Holiday Concert, directed by Donald Milton III, was presented on December 20 & 21, 2024 at the Episcopal Cathedral of Saint Philip.
- The 2025 Spring Concert, directed by Donald Milton III and Dr. Melissa Arasi, was presented on March 15th, 2025 at Glenn Memorial United Methodist Church - Emory Campus. "This Is Me" is a co-production being presented alongside the Atlanta Women's Chorus.
- The 2025 Summer Concert, directed by Donald Milton III, "Disney Pride in Concert" presented on July 21, 2025 at 7:00 PM at Atlanta Symphony Hall. Disney’s beloved songs reimagined by the Atlanta Gay Men’s Chorus along with the Atlanta Symphony Orchestra in a celebration of life, love, family, and pride.
- Broadway Sideways: A Voices of Note's Annual Fundraiser Cabaret, with members from the AGMC and Atlanta Women's Chorus. Under the direction of Jason Wynn, this was presented on May 31, 2025, at Out Front Theatre Company.

45th Concert Season: 2025–2026

- The 2025 45th Holiday Concert, directed by Donald Milton III, was performed on December 5 & 6, 2025 at the Episcopal Cathedral of Saint Philip, marking its 30th year performing in the cathedral!
- The 2026 Spring Concert, directed by Donald Milton III, performed on March 14th, at Monday Night Brewing Garage. A unique, immersive concert experience where the Atlanta Gay Men’s Chorus transformed Monday Night Brewery into PubAGMC -- surrounded by friends, music, and laughter as the chorus filled the room with rousing community songs, heartfelt ballads, and irresistible sing-alongs.
- Panache in Concert, directed by Donald Milton III, presented on Saturday, April 11, 2026 at Outfront Theatre Company. This brings the extraordinary talent of select members of the Atlanta Gay Men’s Chorus to the stage in an intimate, high-impact ensemble. Showcasing stunning vocal artistry, rich harmonies, and dynamic musical storytelling.
- The 2026 Summer Concert, directed by Donald Milton III, centered around the music of legend, Sir Elton John, is set to be performed on June 13th at the Mable House Barnes Amphitheatre in Mableton, GA.
- The 2026 Various Voices Music Festival: A select group of members will be performing for the Various Voices European Choir Festival, from June 24–28, 20236.

46th Concert Season: 2026–2027

- The 2026 46th Holiday Concert, directed by Donald Milton III, is to be presented on December 4 & 5, 2026 at the Episcopal Cathedral of Saint Philip.
- The 2027 Spring Concert, directed by Donald Milton III, titled "Bayard's Vision" is an immersive concert experience to be presented on March 12 & 13, 2027 at the National Center for Civil and Human Rights in celebration of Bayard Rustin Day.
- The 2027 Summer Concert, directed by Donald Milton III, is a reprise of "Transformation" from the 43rd Season. This is to be presented on June 19, 2027, at Atlanta Symphony Hall with the Atlanta Symphony Orchestra. "Transformation" is a powerful message of support and hope based on the Trans and Non-Binary experience.
