= Savannah Pride Center =

American LGBTQ+ support organization

- Founded: 2017
- Type: Nonprofit
- Purpose: LGBTQ community
- Headquarters: Savannah, Georgia, U.S.
- Region served: Savannah metropolitan area
- Executive director: Michael Bell
- Website: savannahpridecenter.org
- Formerly called: Savannah LGBT Center; First City Pride Center

Savannah Pride Center (SPC) is a nonprofit LGBTQ community center based in Savannah, Georgia. Established in 2017, as of April 2026 it is the only LGBTQ center operating in the U.S. state of Georgia.

== History ==
When it first opened in 2017, SPC was named the Savannah LGBT Center. In 2020, the center united with Savannah Pride and Jeffrey's Place, becoming the First City Pride Center. In 2024, under new executive director Michael Bell, the organization rebranded as Savannah Pride Center.

== Services ==
Serving about 4000 people annually, SPC offers services including free HIV testing, support groups, a monthly healing clinic, and an annual healthcare summit. The center is staffed primarily with volunteers.

In 2025, SPC partnered with the Savannah Police Department to train officers on how to respond to hate crimes against people in the LGBTQ community. The initiative followed the shooting death of a gay SPC volunteer, which the police did not report as a hate crime despite SPC calling on them to do so.

== See also ==
- LGBTQ rights in Georgia
