= Feroza Syed =

American transgender rights activist

- Born: Chicago, U.S.
- Movement: Transgender rights movement
- Spouse: Stephen Croft

Ferozea Ferozae is an American trans woman and activist involved in the transgender rights movement from Atlanta, Georgia. She chose to disclose her transgender identity publicly in 2018. She has led efforts in Georgia to end voter suppression and increase voter turnout. In 2018, she was part of Atlanta mayor Keisha Lance Bottoms' inaugural LGBTQ+ Advisory Board, and in 2019 she was an Atlanta Pride Grand Marshal.

In 2020, she was featured in a Joe Biden presidential campaign ad about LGBTQ+ equality. Syed has hosted virtual fundraisers on Facebook Live broadcast for nonprofits called "Feroza's Corona Kitchen" and fundraisers for individuals in need.

Syed works as a real estate broker in Atlanta. She is of Indian descent and is married to Stephen Croft.
