= Pine Lake, Georgia =

- City
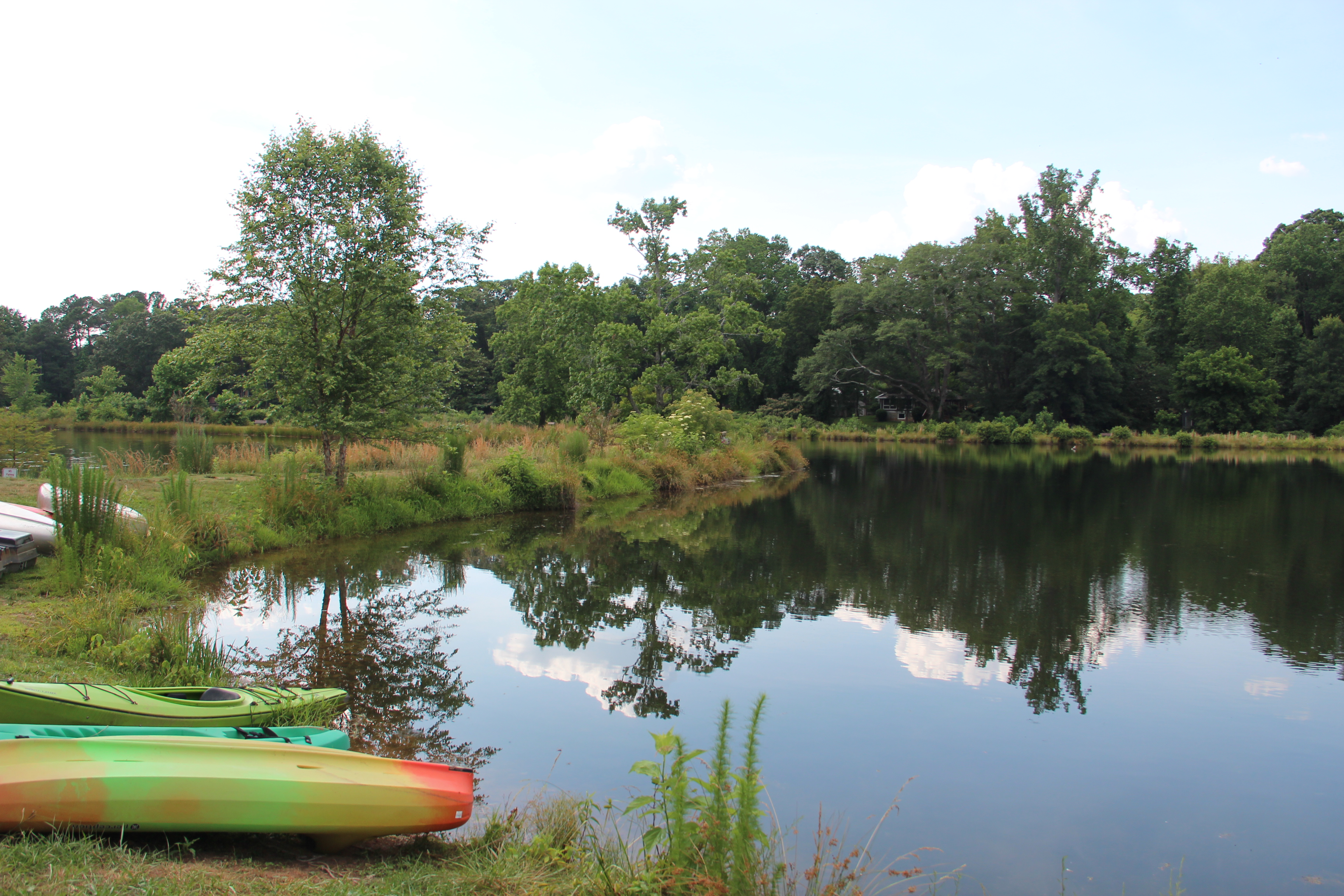
- Pine Lake (2016)

- Location in DeKalb County and the state of Georgia
- Coordinates: 33°47′29″N 84°12′23″W
- Country: United States
- State: Georgia
- County: DeKalb
- Settled: 1929
- Incorporated (city): December 1937

Government
  - Type: Mayor-Council
  - Mayor: Brandy Hall

Area
  - Total: 0.25 sq mi (0.66 km^{2})
  - Land: 0.24 sq mi (0.61 km^{2})
  - Water: 0.015 sq mi (0.04 km^{2})
- Elevation: 948 ft (289 m)

Population (2020)
  - Total: 752
  - Density: 3,170.0/sq mi (1,223.94/km^{2})
- Time zone: UTC-5 (Eastern (EST))
  - Summer (DST): UTC-4 (EDT)
- ZIP code: 30072
- Area code: 404
- FIPS code: 13-61040
- GNIS feature ID: 0332672
- Website: pinelakega.net

Pine Lake is the smallest city in DeKalb County, Georgia, United States. The population was 752 at the 2020 census.

== History ==
Pine Lake was established as a city in December 1937, after a short life as a summer retreat run by the Pine Woods Corporation. The corporation sold lots around a small fishing lake to Atlantans who lived in (then) faraway areas like Buckhead for use as a weekend retreat. The 20' x 100' lots sold for $69, and the advertisement for lots directed people "from Decatur down the [unpaved] Rockbridge Road East." Many homeowners continued to use their property as a weekend getaway long after the city incorporated. Prior to development, Pine Lake was a portion of a farm. The lake was formerly a widened region of Snapfinger Creek, and the valley that encompasses much of the town was where corn was grown. The lake was dammed by the Army Corps of Engineers as erosion and flood control, prior to the official FDR lake projects.

== Geography ==
Pine Lake is located at 33°47′29″N 84°12′23″W (33.791505, -84.206428). According to the United States Census Bureau, the city has a total area of 0.2 square miles (0.52 km^{2}), of which 0.2 square miles (0.52 km^{2}) is land and 5.00% is water.

== Demographics ==
Historical population
Census	Pop.	Note	%±
1940	2		—
1950	566		28,200.0%
1960	738		30.4%
1970	866		17.3%
1980	901		4.0%
1990	810		−10.1%
2000	621		−23.3%
2010	730		17.6%
2020	752		3.0%
U.S. Decennial Census

Pine Lake racial composition as of 2020
Race	Num.	Perc.
White (non-Hispanic)	480	63.83%
Black or African American (non-Hispanic)	141	18.75%
Native American	5	0.66%
Asian	8	1.06%
Other/Mixed	55	7.31%
Hispanic or Latino	63	8.38%

As of the 2020 United States census, there were 752 people, 386 households, and 199 families residing in the city.

== Education ==
Residents are zoned to schools in the DeKalb County School District.

- Stone Mountain High School
- Stone Mountain Middle School
- Rockbridge Elementary School

All of the schools are located outside of the Pine Lake city limits in unincorporated sections of DeKalb County.

== In Media ==
Welcome to Pine Lake, is a documentary feature film released in 2020 by ViacomCBS. The largely observational film looks at the all-women leadership in the predominantly white city of Pine Lake. The documentary claims that the primary funding source of the city's police force is from traffic tickets issued predominately to people of color from the surrounding communities. According to National Public Radio member station KCRW, the filmmaker “found that this progressive town was participating in an unfair and ultimately racist criminal justice system.” In February, 2022, The Atlanta Journal-Constitution wrote, " 'Welcome to Pine Lake' is a scathing indictment of the privilege of obliviousness when it comes to class and race."
