= Atlanta Pride =

Annual LGBTQ event in Atlanta, Georgia

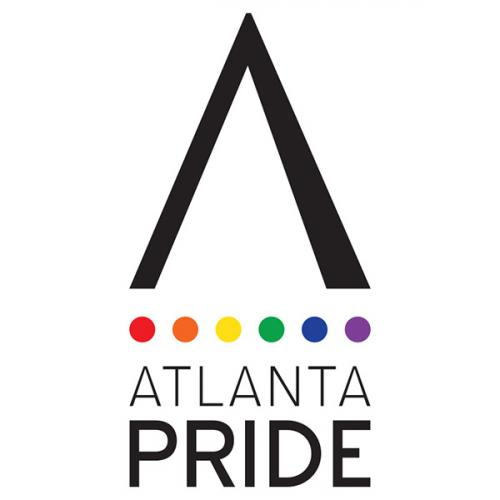

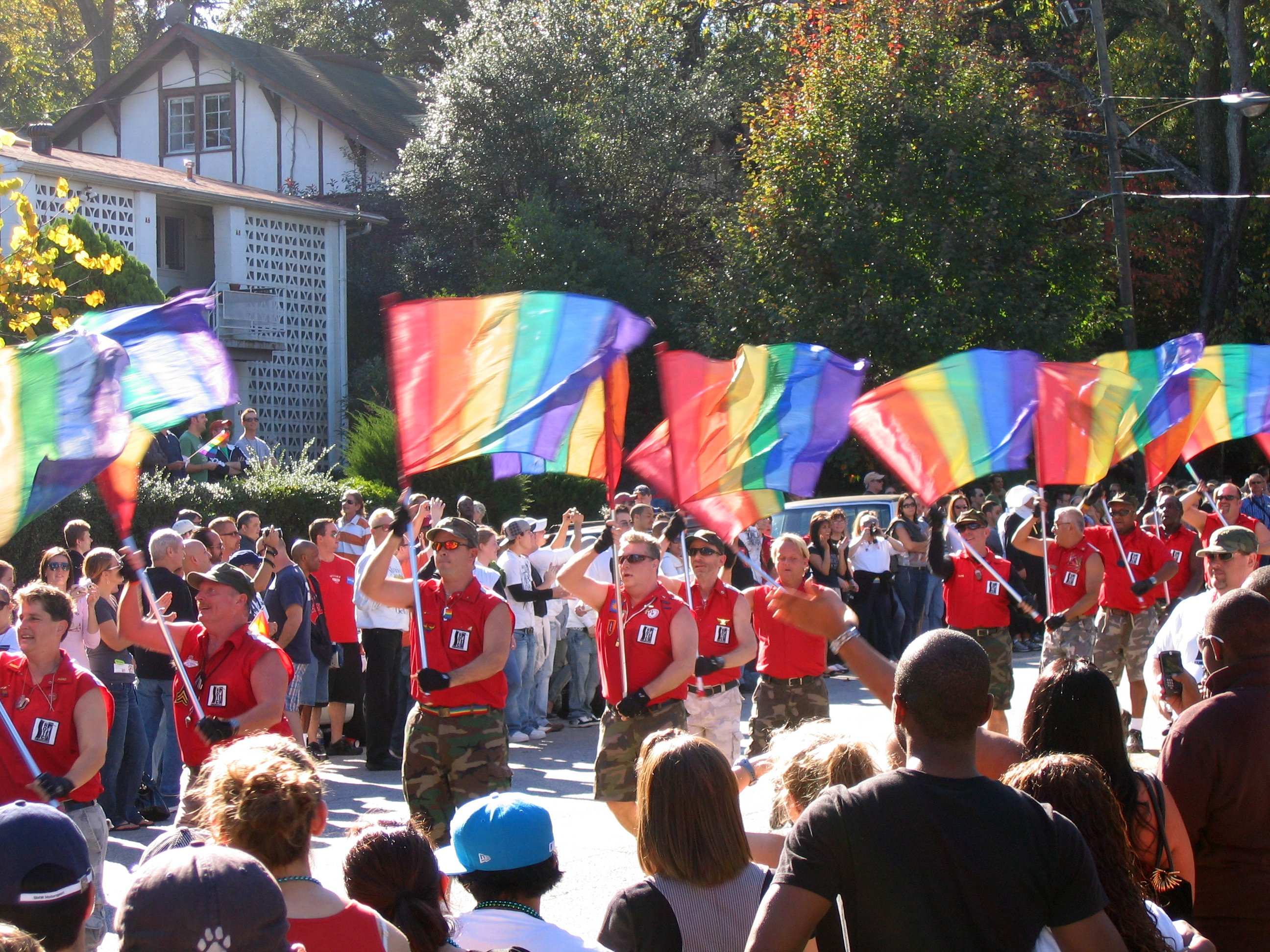
- St. Pete's Righteously Outrageous Twirling Corps in the Atlanta Pride 2009 parade
- Genre: LGBTQ pride parade and festival
- Begins: October (weekend nearest to National Coming Out Day)
- Frequency: Annually
- Locations: Piedmont Park, Atlanta, Georgia, U.S.
- Years active: 1971–present
- Inaugurated: 1971
- Attendance: 350,000+
- Organizer: Atlanta Pride Committee
- Website: www.atlantapride.org

Atlanta Pride, formerly the Atlanta Gay Pride Festival, is a week-long annual lesbian, gay, bisexual, transgender, and queer (LGBTQ) pride festival held in Atlanta, Georgia. Established in 1971, it is the oldest Pride event in the American South and has grown to become the largest free Pride festival in the United States.

According to the Atlanta Pride Committee, the multi-day festival draws over 350,000 attendees annually, with its centerpiece parade attracting more than 100,000 spectators. Originally held in June to commemorate the Stonewall riots, the event has been held in October since 2008, typically during the weekend closest to National Coming Out Day.

== Background ==
While the 1969 Stonewall riots in New York City served as a nationwide macro-catalyst for the gay liberation movement, local mobilization in Atlanta was directly accelerated by local police actions. On August 5, 1969, the Atlanta Police Department raided the Ansley Mall Mini-Cinema during a screening of Andy Warhol's film Lonesome Cowboys, recording and photographing audience members. The incident sparked widespread backlash, prompting local activists to form a Georgia chapter of the Gay Liberation Front in early 1971 to systematically push back against police harassment and structural discrimination. Activists initially marked the first anniversary of the Stonewall riots in June 1970 by organizing literature and leaflet distribution tables in Piedmont Park, laying the groundwork for more visible public demonstrations.

In June 1971, on the second anniversary of Stonewall, approximately 125 activists executed the city's first formal Pride protest march. Because municipal authorities denied the organizers a march permit, participants were forced to walk entirely on sidewalks from Downtown Atlanta to Piedmont Park, stopping at traffic signals to avoid mass arrests for jaywalking. By 1972, the parade drew hundreds of marchers and secured local television news coverage. Facing threats of social, familial, and professional retaliation, several participants in the 1973 march wore paper bags over their heads to shield their identities while visibly demonstrating their community's forced invisibility.

Since 2010, the festival has generated an annual economic impact of over $25 million for the municipal economy. In 2016, Pride.com ranked Atlanta Pride as one of the eight best LGBT pride events in the United States. The festival's growth mirrored Atlanta's emergence as a progressive cultural hub in the American South; in 1976, Mayor Maynard Jackson issued the city's first official "Gay Pride Day" proclamation, and prominent civil rights leaders like Coretta Scott King and Congressman John Lewis frequently addressed main stage audiences over the following decades.

The principal festival weekend takes place in October, but the committee organizes preliminary "Stonewall Week" events every June to maintain ties to the historical summer timelines of the early movement. The committee regularly selects local and national figures to serve as Grand Marshals, including Stacey Abrams and Feroza Syed in 2019. Out on Film, one of the oldest LGBTQ film festivals in the United States, operates its programming cycle concurrently with the broader festival framework.

== Location ==
Until 2008, the festival was staged mid-summer within Piedmont Park in Midtown Atlanta. Due to severe, ongoing drought conditions in 2008, city administrators banned large-scale events in Piedmont Park to preserve the grounds. This forced organizers to relocate to the Atlanta Civic Center asphalt lots and delay the event until October. The festival successfully returned to Piedmont Park in 2009, but the committee voted to permanently retain the autumn schedule. Representatives cited milder October weather and the operational difficulties of attempting to complete a standard fundraising lifecycle within a shortened nine-month window as the defining reasons for the shift.

Atlanta is widely recognized as the LGBTQ cultural capital of the American South. In 2010, The Advocate named Atlanta the "gayest city in America," telescoping its high concentration of queer residents and historic nightlife hubs. The intersection of 10th Street and Piedmont Avenue, which serves as a central gateway for the annual parade, features permanent rainbow crosswalks. The landmark intersection has occasionally been targeted by vandalism, including swastika graffiti in 2022 and property defacement in 2025, drawing swift condemnation from both municipal authorities and the Atlanta Pride Committee.

== Events ==
The formal mission of the Atlanta Pride Committee centers on delivering cultural, civil, and educational programming that highlights the historical contributions of LGBTQ individuals while supporting community wellness initiatives.

The festival operates two major entertainment stages within Piedmont Park: the Coca-Cola Main Stage, situated in the park's Meadow, which hosts national headliners, and the Community Stage near the 12th Street entrance, which showcases regional musicians, dance groups, and emerging talent. As a free-admission music festival, it has historically secured high-profile pop, electronic, and hip-hop performers. Notable past headliners and main stage acts have included Kesha, Ava Max, Icona Pop, Bob the Drag Queen, Saucy Santana, G Flip, Cakes da Killa, Monét X Change, and Mila Jam.

The broader event calendar spans several distinct operations:

- The Atlanta Pride Parade: The festival's primary public event, tracking a route through Midtown down Peachtree Street and 10th Street, featuring corporate, political, and grassroots non-profit floats.
- Identity Marches: Separate, non-motorized marches taking place over the weekend, including dedicated segments for the Atlanta Trans March, the Atlanta Dyke March, and the Bi+ Pan March.
- The Starlight Cabaret: Held on Sunday evening as the closing event on the Main Stage, it is historically recognized as the largest outdoor drag performance event in the United States.
- Educational Panels & Artist Markets: An expansive layout inside the park hosting hundreds of vendors, alongside public forums dealing with intersectional issues like civil rights, race, immigration, and health equity.

== See also ==
- Atlanta Black Pride
- Atlanta Gay Center
- Ansley Mall
- Atlanta Gay Men's Chorus
- Cheshire Bridge Road
- LGBTQ rights in Georgia (U.S. state)
- My Sister's Room
