= Ann Hopkins =

American business manager

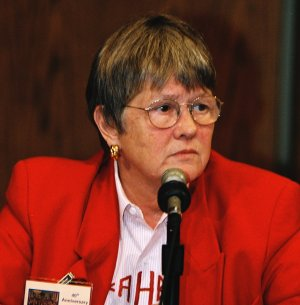
- Hopkins in 2004
- Born: December 18, 1943; Galveston, Texas, U.S.
- Died: June 23, 2018 (aged 74); Washington, D.C., U.S.
- Education: Hollins College (BA); Indiana University (MA)
- Occupation: Management accountant
- Known for: Price Waterhouse v. Hopkins

Ann Branigar Hopkins (December 18, 1943 – June 23, 2018) was an American business manager who was the plaintiff in the landmark American employment discrimination case Price Waterhouse v. Hopkins.

== Early life and education ==
Ann Branigar Hopkins was born in Galveston, Texas, the oldest of three children, but she and her siblings grew up in Germany. Her family moved around every few years, within both Europe and the U.S., as a result of her father's military service.

Hopkins attended Hollins College in Virginia, earning a bachelor's degree in 1965. She continued on to Indiana University Bloomington, where she completed a master's degree in mathematics in 1967.

== Early career ==
Hopkins began her career in aerospace at IBM, where she created mathematical models that predicted the motions of scientific and weather satellites under various conditions. She eventually moved into project management, working for several smaller aerospace firms, but decided to leave the industry in search of a more financially stable career path. She wound up at the national accounting firm Touche Ross, where she met her husband, Tom Gallagher. Anti-nepotism rules at Touche Ross barred both Hopkins and her husband from consideration for partnership after they married, so Hopkins took a job at Price Waterhouse in 1978. Within five years, she had brought the firm more business than any other candidate for partnership.

== Price Waterhouse v. Hopkins ==
In 1982, Hopkins was considered for partnership at Price Waterhouse. At the time, she was the senior manager at the firm's Office of Government Services. She was the only woman among 88 candidates for partnership. Despite her clear success in bringing business to the company, and high praise from other partners as an "outstanding professional" with a "strong character, independence, and integrity", her candidacy was put on indefinite hold. She eventually resigned and sued the company for sex discrimination, arguing that her lack of promotion came after pressure to walk, talk, dress, and act more "femininely". These requirements, she argued, would never have been made of a male colleague and violated Title VII of the Civil Rights Act of 1964.

Lower courts upheld Hopkins' claim, but the case eventually reached the U.S. Supreme Court, which ruled 6-3 in 1989 that Price Waterhouse had, in fact, discriminated based on sex stereotypes. In his lead opinion, Justice William Brennan wrote, "An employer who objects to aggressiveness in women but whose positions require this trait places women in an intolerable and impermissible Catch-22: out of a job if they behave aggressively and out of a job if they don't."

A year after the Supreme Court ruling, a federal district judge awarded Hopkins the partnership she was originally denied at Price Waterhouse. By that time, Hopkins had moved on to the World Bank, where she worked as a senior budget officer. The judge also ordered Price Waterhouse to pay Hopkins between $300,000 and $400,000 in back pay.

In an interview after the decision, Hopkins said of her case: "The explanation I got about why I didn't make partner didn't make sense to me. … I filed suit not because of the money, but because I had been given an irrational explanation for a bad business decision."

== Later career ==
After her landmark case, Hopkins returned to Price Waterhouse, where she worked until her retirement in 2002. The team she led became one of the most diverse and profitable in the company. Hopkins also wrote a book, So Ordered: Making Partner the Hard Way (University of Massachusetts Press, 1996), and began giving lectures on her experience.

== Personal life ==
Hopkins' marriage to Gallagher ended in the mid-1980s and she raised their children, Tela, Gilbert, and Peter, as a single parent. She was a grandmother of five.

Hopkins died in 2018.
