= Riley Gaines Act =

2025 Georgia (state) law

Georgia Legislature
- Long title: AN ACT To amend Title 20 of the Official Code of Georgia Annotated, relating to education, so as to enact the "Riley Gaines Act of 2025"; to provide generally for competitively fair and safe student participation in school and college sports; to provide for legislative findings and intent; to promote fair and safe competition; to provide for equal athletic opportunities and safety; to provide for specific designations of teams operated or sponsored by local school systems, public schools, participating private schools, and postsecondary educational institutions in this state; to prohibit males from participating in interscholastic and intercollegiate competitions on teams designated as female; to prohibit females from participating in competition on intercollegiate teams designated as male, subject to exceptions; to provide for such exceptions; to provide for interscholastic coed team designations; to provide for the use of student eligibility rules, standards, and classifications; to provide for exceptions to general provisions; to require multiple occupancy restrooms and changing areas and sleeping quarters to be designated for exclusive use by males or females; to provide for reasonable accommodations; to provide for exceptions; to prohibit postsecondary educational institutions that are covered entities from hosting or sponsoring intercollegiate competitions that allow males to participate with teams designated as female or use multiple occupancy restrooms or changing areas and sleeping quarters designated for use by females; to prohibit such covered entities from awarding to males scholarships intended for female team members; to provide for policies, rules, and regulations; to provide for investigation of complaints of noncompliance; to provide for sanctions; to provide for a cause of action; to provide for definitions; to provide for statutory construction; to provide for a short title; to provide for related matters; to repeal conflicting laws; and for other purposes.
- Territorial extent: Georgia
- Enacted by: Georgia Senate
- Enacted: February 27, 2025
- Signed by: Brian Kemp
- Signed: April 28, 2025

Legislative history
- Bill title: Senate Bill 1
- Introduced by: Greg Dolezal
- Status: Current legislation

Georgia Senate Bill 1 (S.B. 1), originally known in the House as House Bill 267, primarily known as the Riley Gaines Act and also known as the Fair and Safe Athletic Opportunities Act, is a 2025 law in the state of Georgia that prohibits transgender athletes, namely trans women, from competing in sports that differ from their birth sex and mandates Georgians use public facilities that align with their birth sex. It was signed into law by Governor Brian Kemp on April 28, 2025. The law is named after Riley Gaines, a conservative activist who opposes transgender women in women's sports.

House Bill 267 and Senate Bill 1 are two separate bills, but both are known as the Riley Gaines Act. The major difference between the two is the definition of sex in state law. Senate Bill 1 was passed primarily along party lines and eventually became the final bill.

== Provisions ==
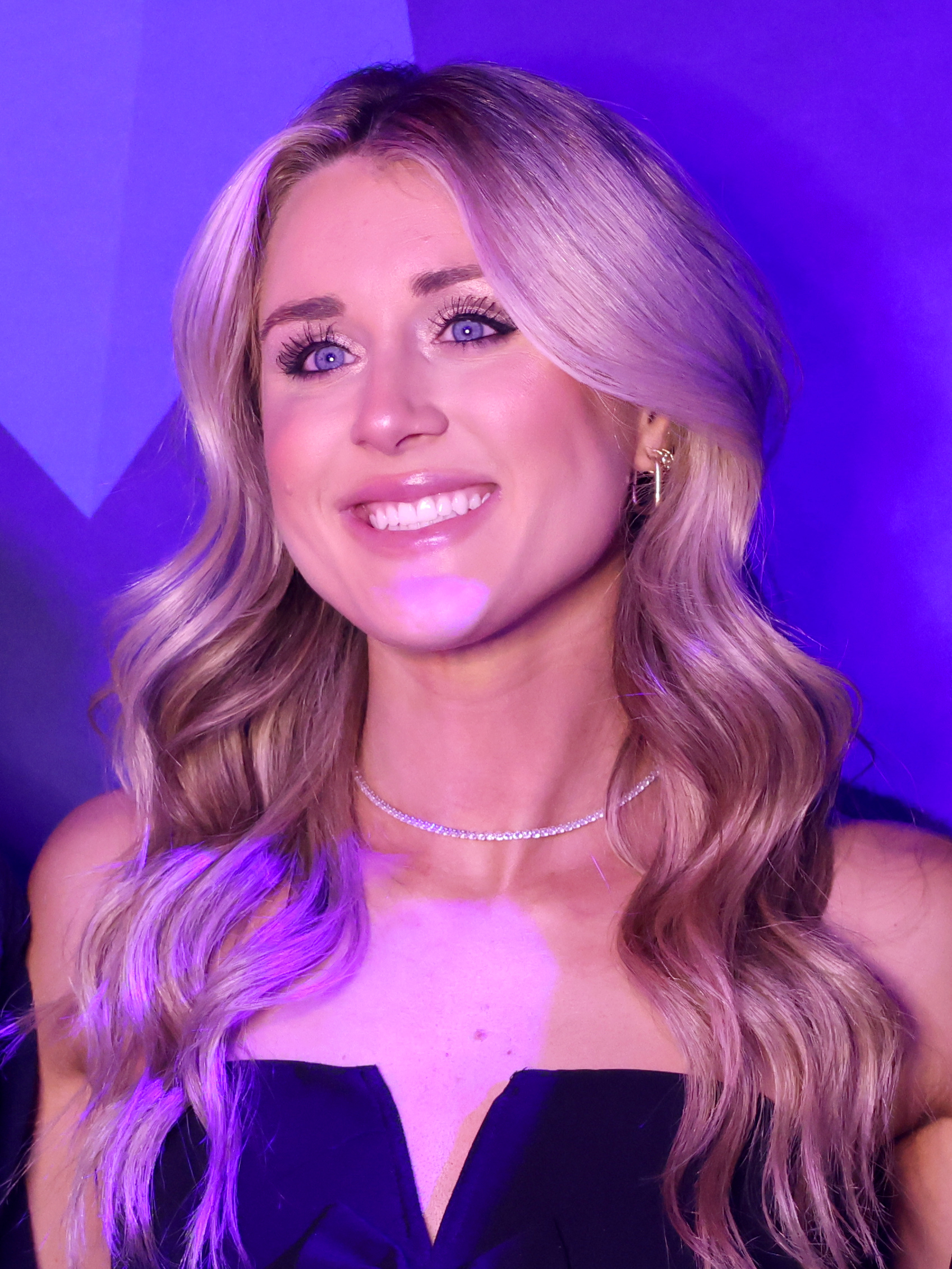
Riley Gaines, the namesake of the Riley Gaines Act

Senate Bill 1 prohibits transgender women from competing in athletic activities that align with their gender identity. It applies to any public school or college in the state. It defines male as someone who produces sperm and female as someone who produces ovum, or eggs.

== Reactions ==
=== Support ===
Senate Bill 1 was supported by House Speaker Jon G. Burns and Lieutenant Governor Burt Jones. A similar bill was introduced in the U.S. Congress by Republican House Representative John McGuire in February 2026.

=== Opposition ===
The ACLU of Georgia opposed Senate Bill 1 due to vague language regarding lawsuits, as well as discrimination in general.
