= Rialto Center for the Arts =

Performing arts center in Atlanta, Georgia

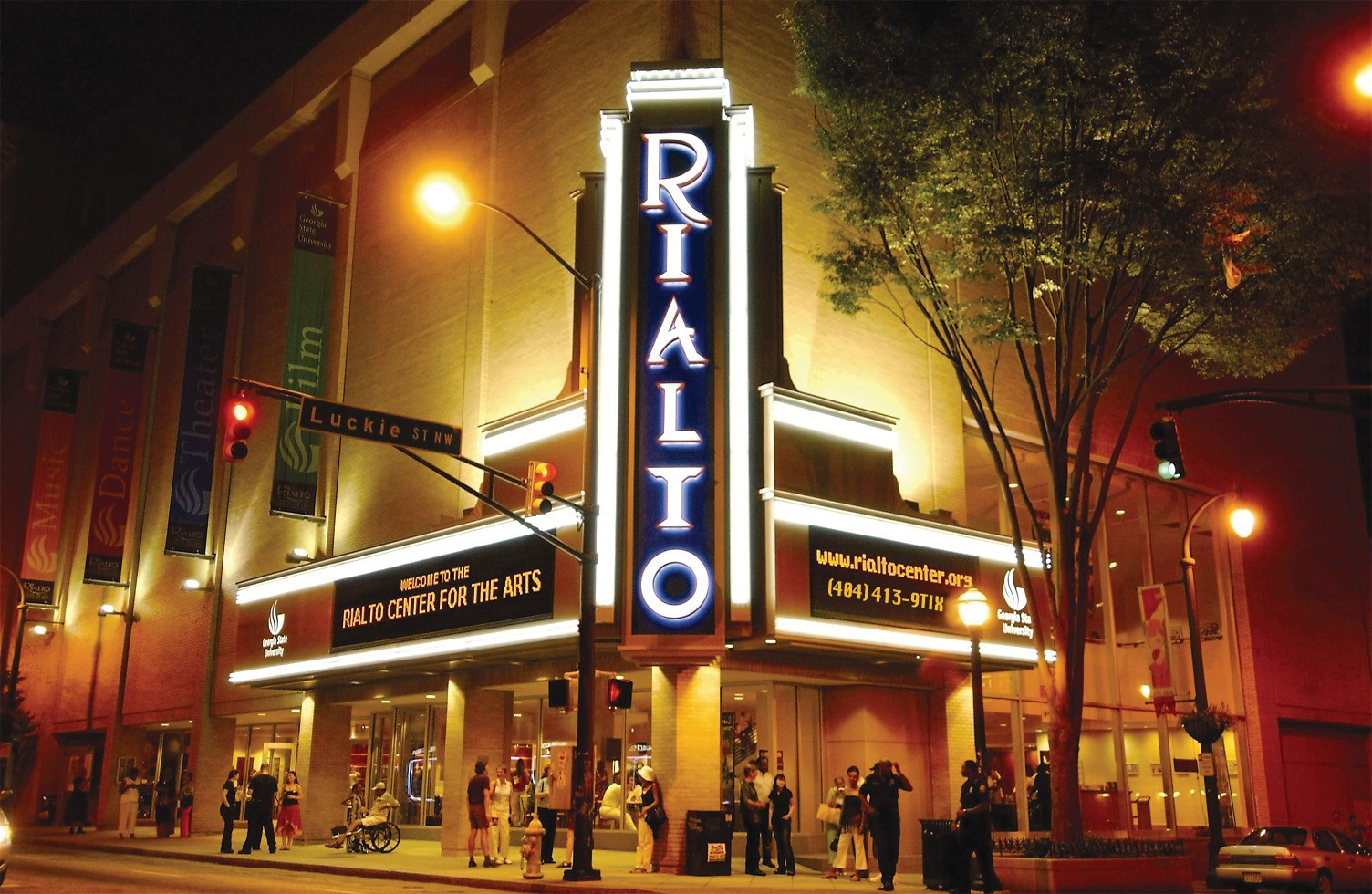
- Interactive map of Rialto Center for the Arts
- Address: 80 Forsyth Street NW
- Location: Atlanta, Georgia
- Coordinates: 33.7568°N 84.3895°W
- Owner: Georgia State University
- Capacity: 833
- Type: Performing arts center
- Public transit: Peachtree Center station

Construction
- Built: 1962

The Rialto Center for the Arts is an 833-seat performing-arts venue owned and operated by Georgia State University and located in the heart of the Fairlie-Poplar district in downtown Atlanta, Georgia. The venue is home to the Rialto Series, an annual subscription series featuring national and international jazz, world music, and dance. The Rialto also routinely presents Georgia State University School of Music performances, the annual National Black Arts Festival, and many others.

== History ==
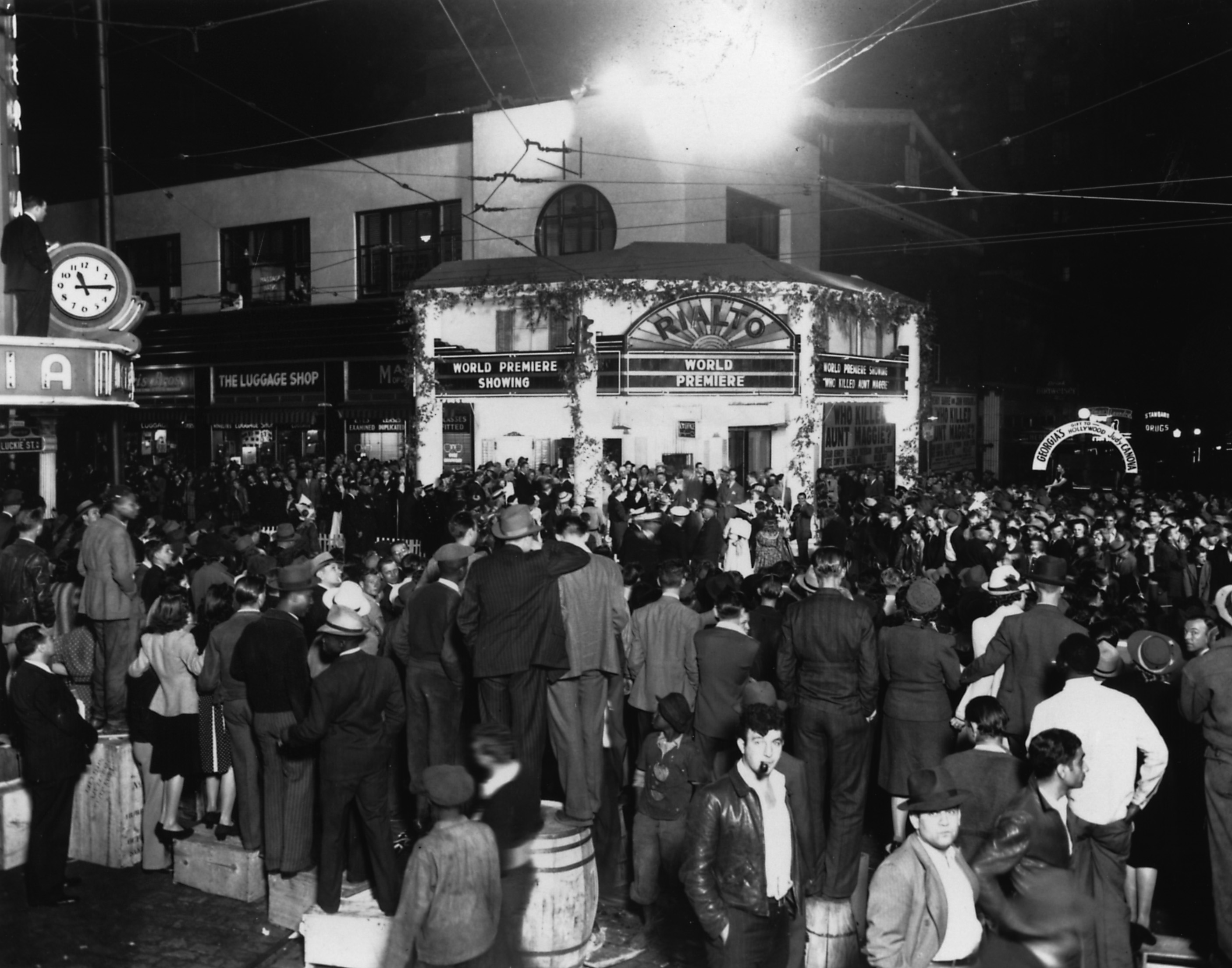
Movie Premiere at the Rialto - 1940

In the fall of 1916, a 925-seat theater, the Southeast's largest movie house, opened in the Central Business District (and the original theater district) of Atlanta. The theater was named the "Rialto," which is defined as an exchange or a marketplace. The Rialto continued to operate throughout the Depression, and at one point even claimed to have the largest electric sign south of New York City above its marquee. In 1962, the original theater building was torn down, and a new 1,200-seat Rialto was built on the same site. It was the first movie theater to be constructed in downtown Atlanta in 35 years and remained open until 1989 before falling victim to a declining downtown economy.

In 1991, Dr. Richard Koehler, then-director of the School of Music at Georgia State University, was approached by a real estate consultant about relocating the School to several vacant buildings in the block bounded by Forsyth, Luckie, Fairlie, and Poplar streets.

After a successful $14 million fundraising effort led by Georgia State University President Carl V. Patton and GSU alumnus and former Southern Company President A.W. "Bill" Dahlberg, the old Rialto Theatre and the nearby Haas-Howell and Standard Buildings were demolished and rebuilt in the autumn of 1994. There was a need for extensive remodeling.

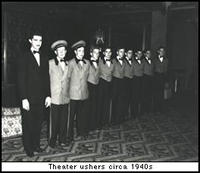
Rialto Ushers circa 1940s

In March 1996, the reopening of the 833-seat Rialto Center for the Performing Arts took place. The 1960s-era Rialto Theater was rebuilt and transformed into a performance venue.

The Rialto Center for the Arts now boasts superb acoustics after the theater's roof was raised 12 feet. Interior renovations included a larger lobby to handle patrons; box office facilities; ADA-accessible improvements; a new stage with a proscenium; an orchestra pit; and 833 new seats. The eight-floor Haas-Howell Building houses the backstage facilities, the Dahlberg Room (the theatre's Green Room), and administrative offices for the Rialto Center on the second and third floors.

== Programming ==
The Rialto Center's offers an annual subscription series, which focuses on international performers and world music—representing the growing global community in the region and the varied student body of Georgia State University—and contemporary jazz, Broadway & Cabaret, and contemporary dance.

In addition to the Rialto Series, the Rialto Center offers many other performances and events throughout the year. As a rental facility, the Rialto is home to arts organizations and host to events.

Atlanta's True Colors Theatre Company regularly presents its performances at the Rialto, as does the Youth Ensemble of Atlanta, the Moving in the Spirit dance company, and the National Black Arts Festival, among many others.

== Education outreach ==
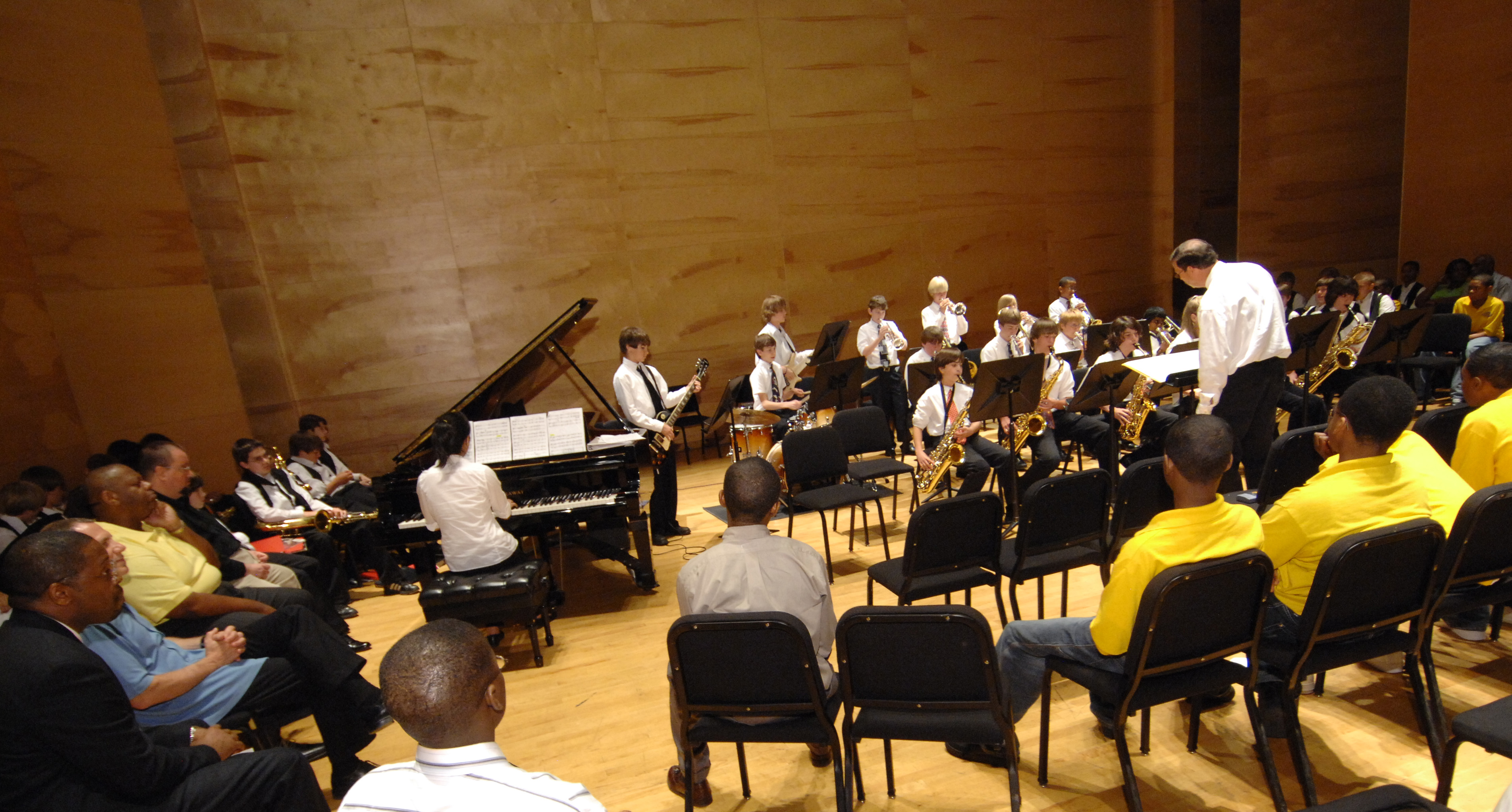
Rialto Jazz for Kids

The Rialto Center provides educational outreach programs to school students and the general public alike. Among the activities the Rialto offers are Master Classes for university and high-school students; open rehearsals and pre-show lectures for the general public; as well as workshops and demonstrations for students and families, utilizing the Rialto Series artists' alleged talents.

The Rialto, in collaboration with the Georgia State University School of Music, has also developed a jazz education program offered to elementary and middle school students.

== Visual arts ==
The Visual Arts Series at the Rialto Center is an ongoing collaboration between the Rialto, Turner First Thursdays, the Comer Art Advisory consulting firm, and the Ernst G. Welch School of Art & Design at Georgia State University. The series regularly transforms the Rialto lobby and mezzanine into an exhibition space for projects organized by Comer Art Advisory. Exhibitions typically relate to Rialto presentations or citywide arts initiatives such as the Atlanta Film Festival, the National Black Arts Festival, Atlanta Celebrates Photography, and ATLart06. Recent years have highlighted the work of Charles H. Nelson, Jr., Alejandro Aguilera, Ruth Laxson, Matt Haffner, among other local, national, and international artists. Additionally, in a special visual arts presentation, the Rialto Center to present panels from the AIDS Memorial Quilt throughout the theater. All of these visual arts exhibitions are free and open to the public.

== Awards ==
The Rialto Center annually presents the "Pioneer Award," to honor leaders who have made a commitment to the arts and culture community at Georgia State, located in the heart of Atlanta. Since 2004, the award has been given to several individuals, including Peg and Bill Balzer, Kathy and Ken Bernhardt, JoAnn Haden-Miller, Kwanza Hall, Joanne McGhee, and former Georgia State presidents Mark P. Becker and his wife Laura L. Voisinet; and Carl Patton and his wife, Gretchen.
