= Glenn v. Brumby =

2011 American federal court case relating to the rights of transgender people

Vandy Beth Glenn, Sewell Brumby
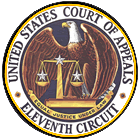
- Court: United States Court of Appeals for the Eleventh Circuit
- Full case name: Glenn v. Brumby et al
- Decided: December 6 2011
- Citations: 724 F. Supp. 2d 1284 (N.D. Ga. 2010), aff'd, 663 F.3d 1312 (11th Cir. 2011)

Holding
- Firing based on transgender status is a form of sex discrimination, associated equal protection claims are subject to intermediate scrutiny.

Court membership
- Judges sitting: Rosemary Barkett, William H. Pryor, Jr., Phyllis A. Kravitch

Case opinions
- Majority: Barkett, joined by a unanimous court

Glenn v. Brumby et al., 724 F. Supp. 2d 1284 (N.D. Ga. 2010), aff'd, 663 F.3d 1312 (11th Cir. 2011), is an American federal court case relating to the rights of transgender people. The case involved Vandy Beth Glenn, a transgender woman living in Georgia, who was dismissed from her job as a legislative editor at the Georgia General Assembly in 2007 on informing her supervisor, Sewell Brumby, of her transgender status.

The lawsuit claimed that the state's action violated the provisions of the Equal Protection Clause against sex-based discrimination.

Glenn prevailed in the United States District Court; the district court's judgment was upheld on appeal.

== See also ==
- Price Waterhouse v. Hopkins
