= Price Waterhouse v. Hopkins =

- Supreme Court of the United States

Argued October 31, 1988 Decided May 1, 1989
- Full case name: Price Waterhouse v. Ann B. Hopkins
- Citations: 490 U.S. 228 (more) 109 S. Ct. 1775; 104 L. Ed. 2d 268; 1989 U.S. LEXIS 2230; 57 U.S.L.W. 4469; 49 Fair Empl. Prac. Cas. (BNA) 954; 49 Empl. Prac. Dec. (CCH) ¶ 38,936

Case history
- Prior: Judgment for plaintiff, 618 F. Supp. 1109 (D.D.C. 1985); Affirmed, 263 U.S. App. D.C. 321, 825 F.2d 458 (1987)

Holding
- Once a Title VII plaintiff proves that gender played a motivating part in an employment decision, the defendant can only avoid a finding of liability by proving by a preponderance of the evidence that it would have made the same decision regardless of the plaintiff's gender.

Court membership
- Chief Justice William Rehnquist Associate Justices William J. Brennan Jr. · Byron White; Thurgood Marshall · Harry Blackmun; John P. Stevens · Sandra Day O'Connor; Antonin Scalia · Anthony Kennedy

Case opinions
- Plurality: Brennan, joined by Marshall, Blackmun, Stevens
- Concurrence: White (in judgment)
- Concurrence: O'Connor (in judgment)
- Dissent: Kennedy, joined by Rehnquist, Scalia

Laws applied
- Title VII of the Civil Rights Act of 1964

Price Waterhouse v. Hopkins, 490 U.S. 228 (1989), is a landmark decision of the US Supreme Court on the issues of prescriptive sex discrimination and employer liability for sex discrimination. The employee, Ann Hopkins, sued her former employer, the accounting firm Price Waterhouse. She argued that the firm denied her partnership because she did not fit the partners' idea of what a female employee should look and act like. The employer failed to prove that it would have denied her partnership anyway, and the Court held that constituted sex discrimination under Title VII of the Civil Rights Act of 1964.

The ruling established that gender stereotyping is actionable as sex discrimination. Furthermore, it established the mixed-motive framework that enables employees to prove discrimination when other, lawful reasons for the adverse employment action exist alongside discriminatory motivations or reasons.

== Background ==
Ann Hopkins began working as a project manager at the accounting firm Price Waterhouse (now PricewaterhouseCoopers) in 1978. After several years of success in her job, Hopkins claimed she was denied partnership at the firm for two years in a row based on her lack of conformity to stereotypes about how women should act and what they should look like. Often co-workers described her as aggressive, foul-mouthed, demanding, and impatient with other staff members. During her evaluation, a written comment made by a firm partner stated that what Hopkins needed was a "course in charm school."

After her promotion was postponed for the first year, Hopkins met with the head supervisor of her department, Thomas Beyer, who told her that to increase chances of promotion she needed to "walk more femininely, talk more femininely, dress more femininely, wear make-up, have her hair styled, and wear jewelry." Hopkins was well qualified for partnership, and frequently outperformed her male co-workers. Many male employees said they would not be comfortable having her as their partner because she did not act the way they believed a woman should.

Ann Hopkins resigned from the accounting firm when she was rejected for partnership for the second year and sued Price Waterhouse for violating her rights under Title VII of the Civil Rights Act of 1964. Both the district court and the federal circuit court of appeals ruled in Hopkins's favor, but courts disagreed about the level of proof (preponderance of evidence versus clear and convincing evidence) that employers needed to provide to support their argument that they would have made the same decision absent their sex discrimination. The case was granted a writ of certiorari and heard before the U.S. Supreme Court.

== Plurality opinion ==
An important issue in this case concerned the appropriate standard for finding liability in Title VII cases. Price Waterhouse argued that the employee must prove that the employer gave "decisive consideration to an employee's gender, race, national origin, or religion" in making an employment decision in order for the employer to be held liable, and that the employer could escape liability by proving that—even absent the discriminatory aspects of the decision making process—the outcome would have been the same. Hopkins argued that the employer's use of discriminatory reasons in its decision-making process should be sufficient to trigger liability. The extent of the consideration, and the result of a hypothetical process not involving the discrimination, could be used to "limit equitable relief," but could not serve as a complete defense as to liability. The court's answer to this question was to compromise.

They first introduced the term "but-for causation" to describe what Price Waterhouse suggests should be the burden of proof, but rejected its validity as an interpretation of the phrase "because of" in Title VII's section on prohibited actions. They reasoned that the two are separate because Congress, in writing the provision, did not write "solely because of", and so, a process that only involved some small amount of discrimination would still be prohibited by the statute.

The court went on to explain that the employer should be able to escape liability if they can prove that they would have made the same decision, had discrimination not played any role in the process. The burden shifts, after the plaintiff proves that discrimination played a role, to the employer to make this rebuttal.

The court also elaborated on the meaning of "gender play[ing] a motivating part in an employment decision", saying that it meant that if, at the moment the decision was made, one of the reasons for making the decision was that the applicant or employee was a woman, then that decision was motivated by gender discrimination. This definition includes stereotypes based on sex, which previous definitions had not. By introducing gender stereotypes into this definition, the Court continues to expand upon the interpretation of Title VII and sets a precedent for expanding the meaning that is used as a precedent in future cases.

Another consequence of this case was that the employer's rebuttal as to the question whether a discriminatory judgment was the "but-for" reason for the decision could be made with only a "preponderance of the evidence", as opposed to the prior standard of "clear and convincing evidence," a reduction in the burden of proof for employers who wish to escape liability.

== Extension ==
In R.G. & G.R. Harris Funeral Homes Inc. v. Equal Employment Opportunity Commission (2020), the Supreme Court ruled that an employer who fires an employee for being gay or transgender violates Title VII, since it is considered sex discrimination. According to SCOTUSblog:

[The] ruling was not only a victory for LGBTQ workers. Bostock was also a victory for heterosexual cisgender women who—like many of our members—work in traditionally male-dominated fields. This includes, by way of example, women security guards, truck drivers, police officers, emergency medical technicians, electrical technicians, road repair crewmembers, corrections officers and railroad engineers. When women succeed in jobs that have historically been held by men, they are often labeled as "gay" or "dykes" as a form of harassment, regardless of whether the assertions about their sexual orientation are true. A career firefighter may be told in her job interview that, if hired, she will "inevitably" become bisexual because no women firefighters are straight. Women security officers may feel compelled to wear makeup and accept sexual advances from male supervisors in order to avoid being called "fags." A warehouse worker may endure harassment from male co-workers who call her "boy" and "man hater" because they assume she is a lesbian or transgender simply because of the job she holds.

== See also ==
- Glenn v. Brumby
- R.G. & G.R. Harris Funeral Homes Inc. v. Equal Employment Opportunity Commission
