= Altitude Express, Inc. v. Zarda =

Altitude Express, Inc.v. Zarda
- Supreme Court of the United States

Argued October 8, 2019 Decided June 15, 2020
- Full case name: Altitude Express, Inc., et al. v. Melissa Zarda, as Executor of the Estate of Donald Zarda, et al.
- Docket no.: 17-1623
- Citations: 590 U.S. ___ (more)

Case history
- Prior: Summary judgment granted, No. 2:10-cv-04334 (E.D.N.Y. Mar 28, 2014); affirmed, 855 F.3d 76 (2d Cir. 2017); reversed, 883 F.3d 100 (en banc, 2d Cir. 2018)

Holding
- An employer who fires an individual merely for being gay or transgender violates Title VII of the Civil Rights Act of 1964. Court of Appeals for the Second Circuit affirmed.

Court membership
- Chief Justice John Roberts Associate Justices Clarence Thomas · Ruth Bader Ginsburg; Stephen Breyer · Samuel Alito; Sonia Sotomayor · Elena Kagan; Neil Gorsuch · Brett Kavanaugh

Case opinions
- Majority: Gorsuch, joined by Roberts, Ginsburg, Breyer, Sotomayor, Kagan
- Dissent: Alito, joined by Thomas
- Dissent: Kavanaugh

Altitude Express, Inc. v. Zarda, 590 U.S. ___ (2020), is a landmark United States Supreme Court civil rights case which ruled that under Title VII of the Civil Rights Act of 1964 employees could not be discriminated against on the basis of sexual orientation or gender identity.

The case involved Donald Zarda, a skydiving instructor for Altitude Express who had told a female customer of his gay identity to make her more comfortable being attached to him during a skydive. She and her boyfriend later expressed their objections to Altitude, leading to Zarda's dismissal on the claim of misconduct. Zarda filed suit in 2014 on the basis of employment discrimination, and though Zarda died in a parachuting accident that year, his family continued the legal battle.

The District Court ruled in favor of Altitude Express in Zarda v. Altitude Express, and this ruling was affirmed by a 3-0 ruling of the United States Court of Appeals for the Second Circuit. However, the Second Circuit agreed to rehear the case en banc, and then ruled in a 10-3 decision that Title VII does protect employees from discrimination based on sexual orientation, adding to a circuit split. The Supreme Court accepted Altitude Express's petition and consolidated the case alongside Bostock v. Clayton County, a similar case of sexual orientation discrimination from the Eleventh Circuit but which ruled that Title VII did not cover such discrimination. Oral arguments were heard on October 8, 2019, alongside the case R.G. & G.R. Harris Funeral Homes Inc. v. Equal Employment Opportunity Commission which dealt with Title VII and employment protections for transgender people. The Court ruled in a 6–3 decision for Bostock, covering all three cases, on June 15, 2020, that Title VII protections do apply to gay and transgender persons.

== Background ==
In 2010, Donald Zarda was fired from his skydiving job at Altitude Express. He had told a customer he was gay to make her more comfortable with being strapped together. The woman's boyfriend later complained to the company that Zarda had inappropriately touched her, and Zarda was fired as a result. In October 2010, the press first reported that Zarda had brought his firing to court and was suing Altitude Express. Altitude Express (in Long Island, New York) claimed Zarda had been fired for alleged "inappropriate behavior in the workplace", with Zarda's lawyer arguing the customer had been homophobic and the firing was due to Zarda's sexual orientation. In the case, Altitude argued that Zarda had touched the client inappropriately, backing up the customer's claims. Zarda's family argued that he had no motive to do such a thing, which was consistent with his job and inconsistent with his sexual orientation, the real motive for his firing. Zarda alleged he was fired for failing to conform to the "straight male macho stereotype". Zarda died on October 3, 2014, in Switzerland in a BASE jumping accident and the case was continued by his family.

== District and Appeals Court ==
Zarda's case was initially heard in United States District Court for the Eastern District of New York in 2014. While the case was in progress, the Equal Employment Opportunity Commission (EEOC) issued a non-binding memo in 2015 that it would treat sexual orientation as covered by Title VII; this aligned with a prior non-binding memo from the Department of Justice (DOJ) that it would also treat sexual orientation as protected under Title VII should such cases be presented to them. Despite these federal memos, the District Court summarily ruled in favor of Altitude Express.

Zarda's estate appealed to the United States Court of Appeals for the Second Circuit. During this case, Donald Trump became president in 2017. Trump took steps to undo many actions previously established by the prior president Barack Obama, including instructing the DOJ to reverse its decision on Title VII protections for sexual orientation. In its new memo, the DOJ asserted that while significant cultural shifts had occurred since the passage of the Civil Rights Act, Congress had not amended the law in any way, and thus rejected that Title VII protected against sexual orientation discrimination as the DOJ had "substantial and unique interest" to follow the letter of the law. No such change was made from the EEOC's stance, putting these two agencies at odds with each other. The three-judge panel at the Second Circuit affirmed the District Court's ruling in April 2017, agreeing that sexual orientation was not covered by Title VII, but commented in the opinion that there were "tensions" around how such cases were being handled by the courts.

Zarda's estate sought an en banc hearing before the full Second District court, which was granted. In July 2017, the DOJ unexpectedly interceded in the case, arguing in a friend of the court brief that Title VII of the 1964 Civil Rights Act of 1964 did not explicitly cover sexual-orientation discrimination in the workplace. Both the DOJ and the EEOC filed opposing amicus briefs. The DOJ explained its position to the Second Circuit. The brief argued that the law does not define "sex," and that the common "ordinary" usage protected being biologically female or male. The American Bar Association announced that it disagreed with the DOJ's stance, arguing to protect gay rights. The DOJ argued as well that employers were free "to regulate employees' off-the-job sexual behavior" and could discriminate for promiscuity, adultery, or sexual orientation. The EEOC reiterated arguments it had "pioneered" in a case in 2015 that informed the Seventh Circuit opinion on the Hively v. Ivy Tech case in 2017. A number of opinions were published on the case.

After the oral argument was made on September 26, 2017, the opinion was issued on February 26, 2018. The full court reversed the prior rulings on a 10–3 vote, and asserted that Title VII prohibits sexual orientation employment discrimination under the category of sex. The court ruled that "because sexual orientation is a function of sex and sex is a protected characteristic under Title VII, it follows that sexual orientation is also protected." The ruling did not focus on the merits of Zarda's case specifically, but whether sexual orientation was protected as a function of sex, and in effect protected gay workers under the Civil Rights Act. In effect, the conclusion held that Zarda's estate could bring Title VII claims against Altitude Express, as the law encompassed discrimination based on sexual orientation. In the ruling, the 2nd Circuit confirmed that its conclusion was the result and continuation of the Supreme Court's 1989 prohibition on gender stereotyping in Price Waterhouse v. Hopkins, as well Oncale v. Sundowner Offshore Services in 1998 that protected both genders from discrimination.

== Supreme Court ==
Prior to the en banc ruling from the Second Circuit, it had been expected for the case to be on track for the Supreme Court. Zarda's legal representative Gregory Antollino argued that, "If you discriminate on the basis of sexual orientation, you necessarily take into account the sex of the employee. You can't take the 'sex' out of "sexual orientation."

In May 2018, the Advocate reported that Altitude Express had appealed the February decision by the U.S. Court of Appeals for the Second Circuit. Altitude Express filed a petition for the Supreme Court to hear the case again, arguing, according to the Advocate, that "expanding the law to cover discrimination based on sexual orientation should be done by legislators, not the judiciary." The petition argued that sexual orientation discrimination did "not amount to discrimination based on gender stereotyping, which some courts have ruled is a type of sex discrimination." In the February ruling, whether sexual orientation discrimination occurred in the case had not been addressed, only the legality of such discrimination. The petition also did not seek to address the merits of the Zarda case specifically, only focusing on whether Title VII applied as a valid type of discrimination. Altitude Express was represented by Saul Zabell of Zabell & Associates. In the petition, Zabell argued that the decision made by the 7th and 2nd Circuits "departed from more than 50 years of established precedent" in that it ruled on the scope of protection for LGBT employees under Title VII. To "resolve the circuit split," the petition called for the Supreme Court to step in. There was no guarantee the court would grant the petition. Donald Zarda's estate, represented by lawyer Gregory Antollino, opposed the Supreme Court review, with Antollino stating that he thought more "circuits need to weigh in" before the Supreme Court involvement and citing other pending cases. It was noted that between the different circuits, the courts were split on the matter of sexual orientation discrimination.

The Supreme Court granted cert to the petition in April 2019 under the case name Altitude Express, Inc. v Zarda (Docket #17-1623). The case was consolidated with another petition, Bostock v. Clayton County (Docket #17-1618), in which a gay employee in the county's child welfare service program was fired for his sexual orientation. In this case, the Eleventh Circuit ruled in favor of the county, that previous case law out of the Fifth Circuit allowed for dismissal of employees due to sexual orientation. The Court's granting of cert was announced alongside another related case to be heard by the court R.G. & G.R. Harris Funeral Homes Inc. v. Equal Employment Opportunity Commission, related to whether Title VII protections included transgender individuals.

Altitude Express, Bostock and Harris were heard during October 8, 2019 oral arguments. In oral arguments the Court's more conservative Justices argued that because Congress had not included sexual orientation at the time of the Civil Rights Act, nor had updated the law to include it since, they feared creating law outside Congress's authority. Arguments also centered on how the word "sex" in Title VII could be interpreted to include sexual orientation, and not strictly gender.

=== Decision ===
==== Majority opinion ====
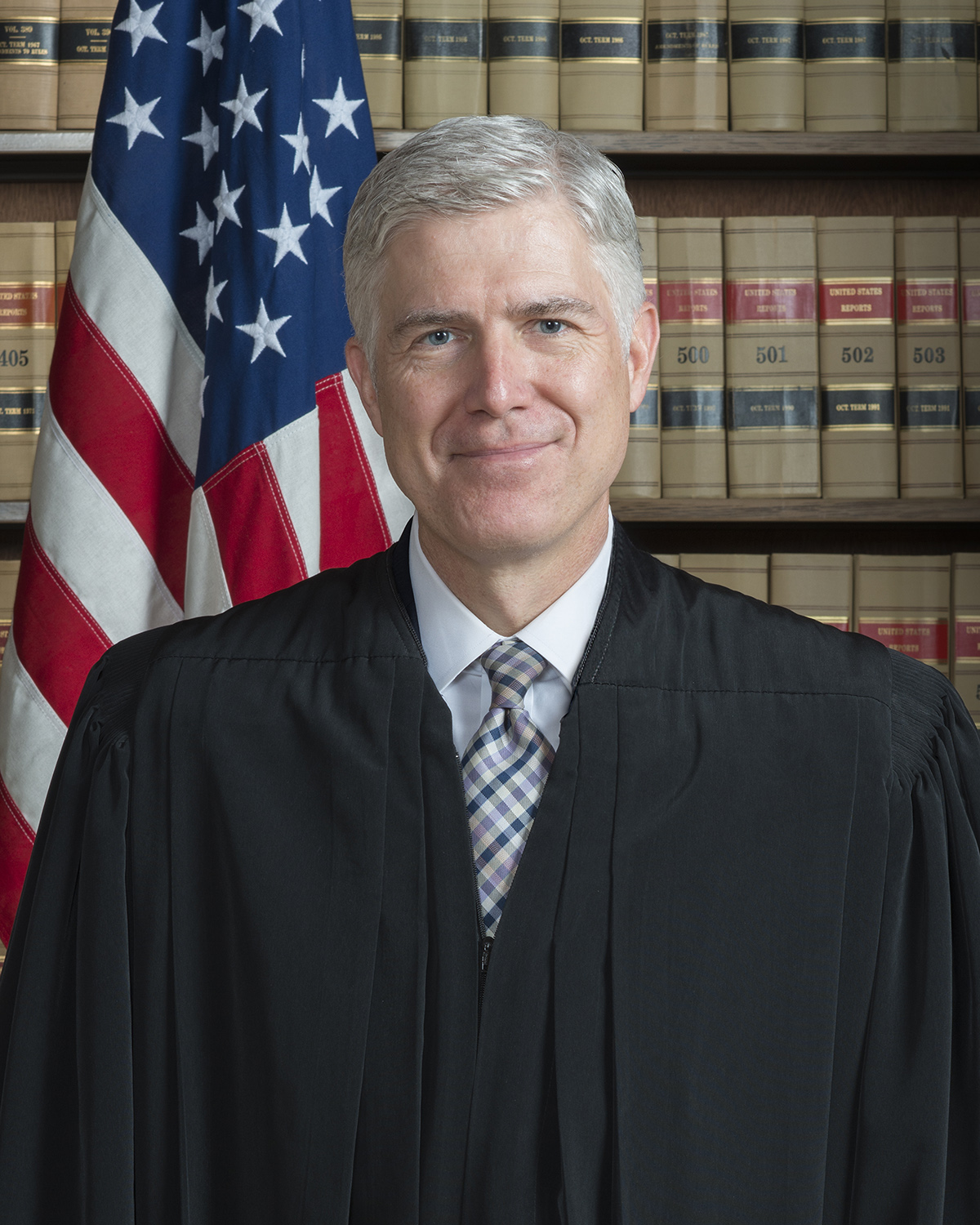
Justice Neil Gorsuch delivered the opinion of the Court

Justice Neil Gorsuch delivered the opinion of the Court in this case on June 15, 2020. In a 6–3 decision, the Court held that Title VII protections pursuant to § 2000e-2(a)(1) did extend to cover sexual orientation and gender identity. The decision then involved the statutory interpretation of Title VII (specifically the original meaning of "sex"), not constitutional law as in other recent landmark cases involving the rights of LGBTQ individuals such as Obergefell v. Hodges. The Court further held that Title VII protections against sex discrimination in the employment context apply to discrimination against particular individuals on the basis of sex, as opposed to discrimination against groups. Thus, Title VII provides a remedy to individuals who experience discrimination on the basis of sex even if an employer's policy on the whole does not involve discrimination. Gorsuch wrote:

An employer who fires an individual for being homosexual or transgender fires that person for traits or actions it would not have questioned in members of a different sex. Sex plays a necessary and undisguisable role in the decision, exactly what Title VII forbids. Those who adopted the Civil Rights Act might not have anticipated their work would lead to this particular result. But the limits of the drafters' imagination supply no reason to ignore the law's demands. Only the written word is the law, and all persons are entitled to its benefit.

In his opinion, Gorsuch wrote, "it is irrelevant what an employer might call its discriminatory practice, how others might label it, or what else might motivate it." He referenced Phillips v. Martin Marietta Corp., in which a company refused to hire women with young children; and City of L.A. Dep't of Water & Power v. Manhart, in which an employer required women to make larger pension fund contributions than did men, on the premise that women on average live longer than men do. Both cases violated Title VII, and Gorsuch wrote, "just as labels and additional intentions or motivations didn't make a difference in Manhart or Phillips, they cannot make a difference here."

Gorsuch's decision also alluded to concerns that the judgment may set a sweeping precedent that would force gender equality on traditional practices. "They say sex-segregated bathrooms, locker rooms, and dress codes will prove unsustainable after our decision today but none of these other laws are before us; we have not had the benefit of adversarial testing about the meaning of their terms, and we do not prejudge any such question today."

==== Dissents ====
Justice Samuel Alito wrote a dissent, joined by Justice Clarence Thomas. In his dissent, Alito asserted that at the time of the crafting of the Civil Rights Act in 1964 the concepts of sexual orientation and transgender identity would have been unknown, and thus Congress's language should not be implied to cover these facets. Alito wrote, "Many will applaud today's decision because they agree on policy grounds with the Court's updating of Title VII. But the question in these cases is not whether discrimination because of sexual orientation or gender identity should be outlawed. The question is whether Congress did that in 1964. It indisputably did not." Alito further stated that "even if discrimination based on sexual orientation or gender identity could be squeezed into some arcane understanding of sex discrimination, the context in which Title VII was enacted would tell us that this is not what the statute's terms were understood to mean at that time." Alito was critical of the majority decision:

There is only one word for what the Court has done today: legislation. The document that the Court releases is in the form of a judicial opinion interpreting a statute, but that is deceptive ... A more brazen abuse of our authority to interpret statutes is hard to recall. The Court tries to convince readers that it is merely enforcing the terms of the statute, but that is preposterous.

Justice Brett Kavanaugh wrote a separate dissent, arguing that the Court could not add sexual orientation or gender identity to Title VII due to the separation of powers, leaving this responsibility to Congress. He concluded by acknowledging that

Millions of gay and lesbian Americans have worked hard for many decades to achieve equal treatment in fact and law ... They have advanced powerful policy arguments and can take pride in today's result. Under the Constitution's separation of powers, however, I believe that it was Congress's role, not this Court's, to amend Title VII.

== See also ==
- List of LGBT-related cases in the United States Supreme Court
