= R.G. & G.R. Harris Funeral Homes Inc. v. Equal Employment Opportunity Commission =

- Supreme Court of the United States

Argued October 8, 2019 Decided June 15, 2020
- Full case name: R.G. & G.R. Harris Funeral Homes Inc. v. Equal Employment Opportunity Commission, et al.
- Docket no.: 18-107
- Citations: 590 U.S. ___ (more) 140 S. Ct. 1731
- Argument: Oral argument

Case history
- Prior: Motion to dismiss denied, 100 F. Supp. 3d 594 (E.D. Mich. 2015); summary judgment granted, 201 F. Supp. 3d 837 (E.D. Mich. 2016); reversed, 884 F.3d 560 (6th Cir. 2018); cert. granted, 203 L. Ed. 2d 754 (2019).

Questions presented
- Whether Title VII prohibits discrimination against transgender people based on (1) their status as transgender or (2) sex stereotyping under Price Waterhouse v. Hopkins.

Holding
- An employer who fires an individual merely for being gay or transgender violates Title VII of the Civil Rights Act of 1964. Court of Appeals for the Sixth Circuit affirmed.

Court membership
- Chief Justice John Roberts Associate Justices Clarence Thomas · Ruth Bader Ginsburg; Stephen Breyer · Samuel Alito; Sonia Sotomayor · Elena Kagan; Neil Gorsuch · Brett Kavanaugh

Case opinions
- Majority: Gorsuch, joined by Roberts, Ginsburg, Breyer, Sotomayor, Kagan
- Dissent: Alito, joined by Thomas
- Dissent: Kavanaugh

Laws applied
- Title VII of the Civil Rights Act 1964

R.G. & G.R. Harris Funeral Homes Inc. v. Equal Employment Opportunity Commission, 590 U.S. ___ (2020), is a landmark United States Supreme Court case which ruled that Title VII of the Civil Rights Act of 1964 protects transgender people from employment discrimination.

Aimee Stephens was a funeral home employee who had presented herself as male up until 2013. On July 31, 2013, she wrote to her employer, the Harris Funeral Homes group, so that they could be prepared for her decision to undergo gender reassignment surgery, telling them that after a vacation, she planned to return dressed in female attire that otherwise followed the employee handbook. She was fired shortly after the letter was sent, and the Equal Employment Opportunity Commission helped to represent Stephens in court. The District Court ruled for the funeral homes, stating Title VII did not cover transgender people and that as a religious organization under the Religious Freedom Restoration Act, the company had a right to dismiss Stephens for non-conformity. The Sixth Circuit Court of Appeals reversed the decision, concluding Title VII did include protection for transgender people, which Harris Funeral Homes petitioned the Supreme Court to review. About a month before the Supreme Court decision, Stephens died from health complications. Representation of her case continued through her estate.

The case was heard on October 8, 2019, alongside two other cases, Bostock v. Clayton County and Altitude Express, Inc. v. Zarda which dealt with Title VII protection related to sexual orientation. The Court ruled in a 6–3 decision under Bostock but covering all three cases on June 15, 2020, that Title VII protection extends to gay and transgender people.

== Case background ==
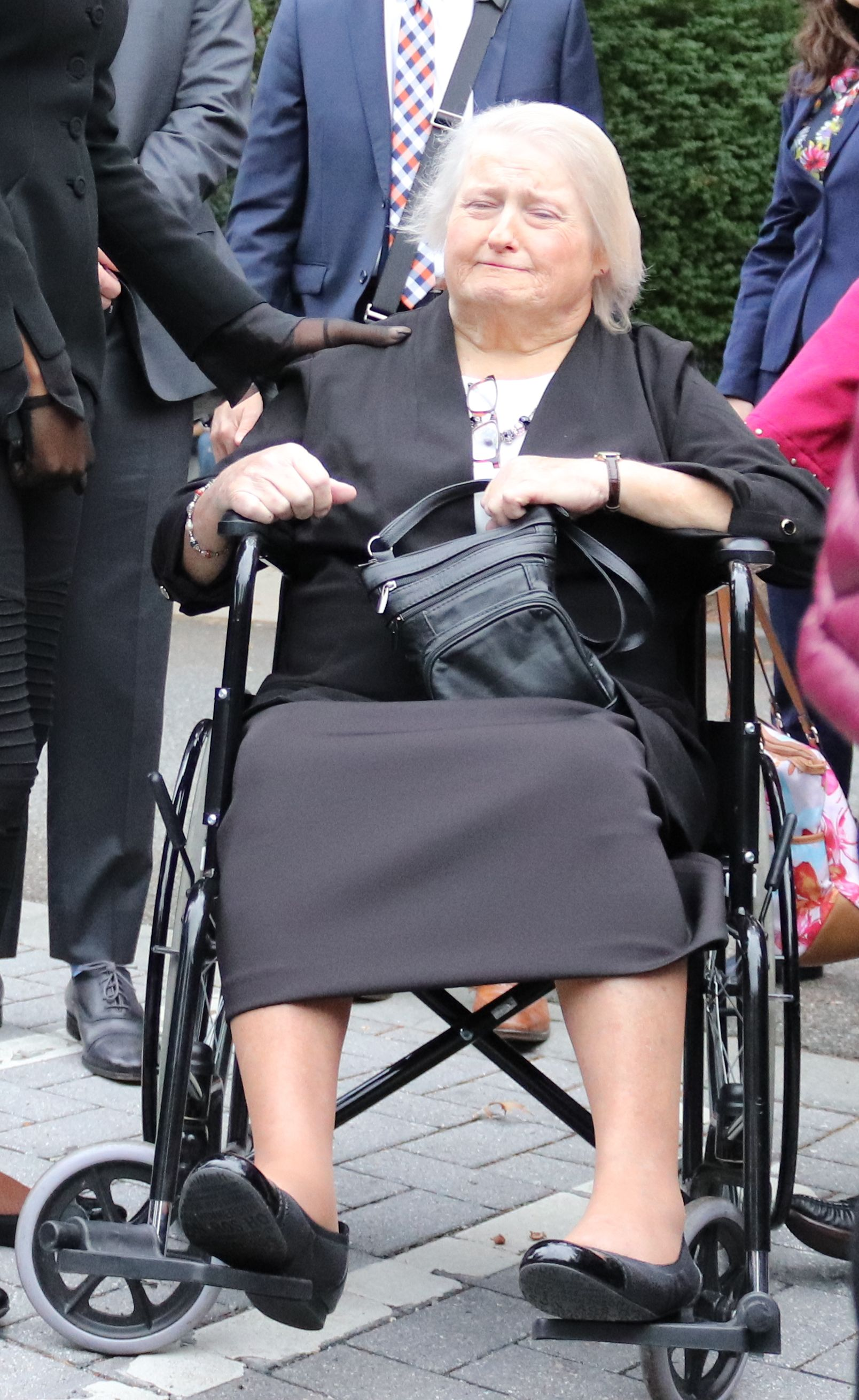
Stephens at the Supreme Court on October 8, 2019

In the United States, the Civil Rights Act of 1964 is a landmark piece of legislation to prevent discrimination across race, color, religion, sex, or national origin. Among its titles include Title VII, relating to equal employment opportunities and employment discrimination, with the same classes protected against discrimination in employment as well. However, at issue has remained how the act covers the areas of gender identity as well as sexual orientation as they are not mentioned explicitly. This has led to disjointed coverage of LGBT and gender identity rights with some states issuing specific anti-discrimination for these groups. The Equality Act which includes these classes under the Civil Rights Act, has twice (2019 and 2021) passed the House of Representatives, but it has not been ratified by the Senate, as of August 2025.

Stephens considered herself a transgender woman for most of her adult life but presented herself as a male, which reportedly caused her constant emotional stress. In 2013, she decided to come out to family and friends, and arranged to undergo reassignment surgery within the next year, expressing herself as a woman prior to transition as part of real-life experience. At that time, she had been an employee of R.G. & G.R. Harris Funeral Homes for six years, and had an excellent work record. She wrote her supervisor regarding this matter prior to taking a vacation from work, and as to help with the transition, she would return to work in attire appropriate for female employees as outlined in their employee handbook. Two weeks later, Stephens was notified by mail that she had been terminated by the funeral home's owner, Thomas Rost. They attempted to mediate an amicable departure, with Rost offering Stephens a severance package, but she refused to take it.

Stephens filed a complaint with the Equal Employment Opportunity Commission (EEOC), believing she had been discriminated against due to being transgender. EEOC agreed and took the case against the funeral home to the United States District Court for the Eastern District of Michigan. There in 2016, the district court found for the funeral home on two bases: firstly that in Title VII, neither transgender people nor gender identity were protected classes, secondly, that because Rost was a devout Christian who does not accept that one can change one's gender, and ran the homes under his religion, that the Religious Freedom Restoration Act gave him the ability to fire Stephens if she would not conform.

The EEOC appealed to the Sixth Circuit. In March 2018, the Sixth Circuit reversed the decision, ruling that Title VII's "discrimination by sex" does include transgender persons. The court also considered that the funeral home had failed to show how the Civil Rights Act burdened Rost from expressing his religious freedom. Part of the Sixth's decision rested on the 1989 case Price Waterhouse v. Hopkins which states that employers cannot discriminate against employees for failure to conform to the stereotypical behavior of a man or woman. The case revolves around protections relating to public and private employees from being discriminated upon because of sex and whether this applies to gender identity for transgender persons.

In May 2020, before the Supreme Court had issued a decision, Stephens entered hospice care, as her long-term kidney disease had become untreatable. She died on May 12, 2020, at age 59. Stephens's lawyers, from the American Civil Liberties Union, said that the case would be carried on by her estate.

== Supreme Court ==
The funeral home was represented by the Alliance Defending Freedom, an American conservative Christian legal advocacy group involved in multiple transgender rights cases. They filed a petition in the U.S. Supreme Court for a writ of certiorari, asking the Court to hear the case. There had been a circuit split on the issue of whether Title VII protects employees from employment discrimination based on sexual orientation. The Second Circuit in Zarda v. Altitude Express, Inc. and the Seventh Circuit in Hively v. Ivy Tech Community College found that the Title VII protects employees from discrimination on the basis of sexual orientation; the Eleventh Circuit in Bostock v. Clayton County came to the opposite conclusion. The U.S. Department of Justice filed a brief with the Supreme Court in October 2018 arguing that the Sixth Circuit had decided wrongly and that Harris Funeral Homes had a right to fire an employee for being transgender.

The Court granted the cert petition (agreeing to hear the appeal) for Harris Funeral Homes in April 2019, alongside a pair of cases consolidated under Bostock which raised the same question related to Title VII discrimination against sexual orientation. Harris and these cases were heard on October 8, 2019. In oral arguments, the Court's conservative justices argued that because Congress had not included gender identity at the time of the Civil Rights Act and had not updated the law to include it, the Court should not create new law beyond Congress's intentions. Arguments also centered on how the word "sex" in Title VII could be interpreted to include transgender individuals.

=== Decision ===
==== Majority opinion ====
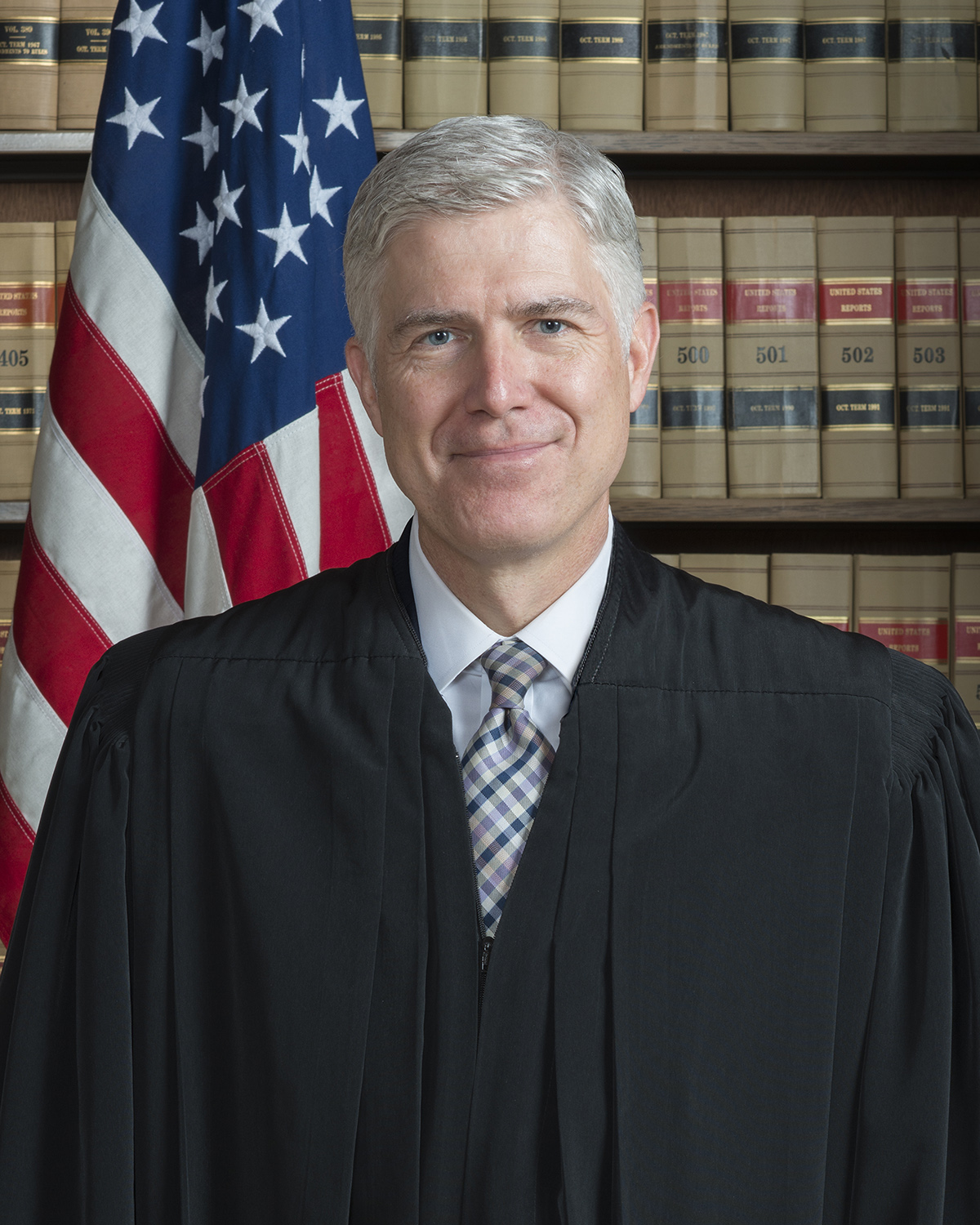
Justice Neil Gorsuch delivered the opinion of the Court

Justice Neil Gorsuch delivered the opinion of the Court in this case on June 15, 2020. In a 6–3 decision, the Court held that Title VII protections pursuant to § 2000e-2(a)(1) did extend to cover sexual orientation and gender identity. The decision then involved the statutory interpretation of Title VII (specifically the original meaning of "sex"), not constitutional law as in other recent landmark cases involving the rights of LGBTQ individuals such as Obergefell v. Hodges. The Court further held that Title VII protections against sex discrimination in the employment context apply to discrimination against particular individuals on the basis of sex, as opposed to discrimination against groups. Thus, Title VII provides a remedy to individuals who experience discrimination on the basis of sex even if an employer's policy on the whole does not involve discrimination. Gorsuch wrote:

An employer who fires an individual for being homosexual or transgender fires that person for traits or actions it would not have questioned in members of a different sex. Sex plays a necessary and undisguisable role in the decision, exactly what Title VII forbids. Those who adopted the Civil Rights Act might not have anticipated their work would lead to this particular result. But the limits of the drafters' imagination supply no reason to ignore the law's demands. Only the written word is the law, and all persons are entitled to its benefit.

In his opinion, Gorsuch wrote, "it is irrelevant what an employer might call its discriminatory practice, how others might label it, or what else might motivate it." He referenced Phillips v. Martin Marietta Corp., in which a company refused to hire women with young children; and City of L.A. Dep't of Water & Power v. Manhart, in which an employer required women to make larger pension fund contributions than did men, on the premise that women on average live longer than men do. Both cases violated Title VII, and Gorsuch wrote, "just as labels and additional intentions or motivations didn't make a difference in Manhart or Phillips, they cannot make a difference here."

Gorsuch's decision also alluded to concerns that the judgment may set a sweeping precedent that would force gender equality on traditional practices. "They say sex-segregated bathrooms, locker rooms, and dress codes will prove unsustainable after our decision today but none of these other laws are before us; we have not had the benefit of adversarial testing about the meaning of their terms, and we do not prejudge any such question today."

==== Dissents ====
Justice Samuel Alito wrote a dissent, joined by Justice Clarence Thomas. In his dissent, Alito asserted that at the time of the crafting of the Civil Rights Act in 1964 the concepts of sexual orientation and transgender identity would have been unknown, and thus Congress's language should not be implied to cover these facets. Alito wrote, "Many will applaud today's decision because they agree on policy grounds with the Court's updating of Title VII. But the question in these cases is not whether discrimination because of sexual orientation or gender identity should be outlawed. The question is whether Congress did that in 1964. It indisputably did not." Alito further stated that "even if discrimination based on sexual orientation or gender identity could be squeezed into some arcane understanding of sex discrimination, the context in which Title VII was enacted would tell us that this is not what the statute's terms were understood to mean at that time." Alito was critical of the majority decision:

There is only one word for what the Court has done today: legislation. The document that the Court releases is in the form of a judicial opinion interpreting a statute, but that is deceptive ... A more brazen abuse of our authority to interpret statutes is hard to recall. The Court tries to convince readers that it is merely enforcing the terms of the statute, but that is preposterous.

Justice Brett Kavanaugh wrote a separate dissent, arguing that the Court could not add sexual orientation or gender identity to Title VII due to the separation of powers, leaving this responsibility to Congress. He concluded by acknowledging that

Millions of gay and lesbian Americans have worked hard for many decades to achieve equal treatment in fact and law ... They have advanced powerful policy arguments and can take pride in today's result. Under the Constitution's separation of powers, however, I believe that it was Congress's role, not this Court's, to amend Title VII.

== See also ==
- List of LGBT-related cases in the United States Supreme Court
