= Bostock v. Clayton County =

- Supreme Court of the United States

Argued October 8, 2019 Decided June 15, 2020
- Full case name: Gerald Lynn Bostock v. Clayton County, Georgia
- Docket no.: 17-1618
- Citations: 590 U.S. 644 (more) 140 S. Ct. 1731; 207 L. Ed. 2d 218; 2020 WL 3146686; 2020 U.S. LEXIS 3252
- Argument: Oral argument

Case history
- Prior: Bostock v. Clayton Cnty., No. 1:16-cv-001460, 2016 WL 9753356 (N.D. Ga. November 3, 2016); report and recommendation adopted, 2017 WL 4456898 (N.D. Ga. July 21, 2017); affirmed sub nom. Bostock v. Clayton Cnty. Bd. of Commissioners, 723 F. App'x 964 (11th Cir. 2018); cert. granted, 139 S.Ct. 1599 (2019).; Zarda v. Altitude Express, Inc., No. 2:10-cv-04334 (E.D.N.Y. March 28, 2014); affirmed, 855 F.3d 76 (2d Cir. 2017); reversed on rehearing en banc, 883 F.3d 100 (2d Cir. 2018); cert. granted, 139 S.Ct. 1599 (2019).; Equal Employment Opportunity Comm'n v. R.G. & G.R. Harris Funeral Homes Inc., 100 F. Supp. 3d 594 (E.D. Mich. 2015); summary judgment granted, 201 F. Supp. 3d 837 (E.D. Mich. 2016); reversed, 884 F.3d 560 (6th Cir. 2018); cert. granted, 139 S.Ct. 1599 (2019).

Holding
- An employer who fires an individual based on their sexual orientation or gender identity violates Title VII of the Civil Rights Act of 1964.

Court membership
- Chief Justice John Roberts Associate Justices Clarence Thomas · Ruth Bader Ginsburg; Stephen Breyer · Samuel Alito; Sonia Sotomayor · Elena Kagan; Neil Gorsuch · Brett Kavanaugh

Case opinions
- Majority: Gorsuch, joined by Roberts, Ginsburg, Breyer, Sotomayor, Kagan
- Dissent: Alito, joined by Thomas
- Dissent: Kavanaugh

Laws applied
- Title VII of the Civil Rights Act of 1964

Bostock v. Clayton County, 590 U.S. 644 (2020), is a landmark United States Supreme Court civil rights decision in which the Court held that Title VII of the Civil Rights Act of 1964 protects employees against discrimination on the basis of sexual orientation or gender identity.

The plaintiff, Gerald Bostock, was fired from his county job after he expressed interest in a gay softball league at work. The lower courts followed the Eleventh Circuit's past precedent that Title VII did not cover employment discrimination based on sexual orientation. The case was consolidated with Altitude Express, Inc. v. Zarda, a similar case of apparent discrimination due to sexual orientation from the Second Circuit, but which had added to a circuit split. Oral arguments were heard on October 8, 2019, alongside R.G. & G.R. Harris Funeral Homes Inc. v. Equal Employment Opportunity Commission, a similar question of Title VII discrimination relating to transgender persons.

On June 15, 2020, the Court ruled in a 6–3 decision covering all three cases that discrimination on the basis of sexual orientation or gender identity is necessarily also discrimination "because of sex" as prohibited by Title VII. According to Justice Neil Gorsuch's majority opinion, that is so because employers discriminating against gay or transgender employees accept a certain characteristic (e.g., attraction to women) in employees of one sex but not in employees of the other sex.

The ruling has been hailed as one of the most important legal decisions regarding LGBTQ rights in the United States, along with Lawrence v. Texas (2003) and Obergefell v. Hodges (2015). Many legal analysts claimed that the case defined Gorsuch as a textualist in statutory interpretation.

== Background ==
=== Legislation and prior case law ===
The Civil Rights Act of 1964 was passed into law amid the civil rights movement. It had been proposed by President John F. Kennedy as a means to combat racial discrimination and racial segregation in the aftermath of the Birmingham campaign. After Kennedy's assassination in November 1963, his successor Lyndon B. Johnson advocated passage of the Civil Rights Act in the following year.

Among several provisions in the law is Title VII, which covers equal employment opportunities. Its key provision, codified at 42 U.S.C. § 2000e-2(a)(1), states that it is illegal to discriminate in any hiring or employment practices based on an "individual's race, color, religion, sex, or national origin". To enforce this requirement, Title VII established the Equal Employment Opportunity Commission (EEOC), a federal agency based on an office Kennedy had established with Executive Order 10925, to help oversee any reported employment discrimination and file lawsuits against entities that the EEOC believes have discriminated in the employment context. In addition, the EEOC may make its own determination on cases rather than taking these to court. These decisions do not carry the weight of case law, but the Supreme Court does consider the weight of the EEOC opinions as the EEOC "constitute[s] a body of experience and informed judgment to which courts and litigants may properly resort for guidance".

The nature of protected classes under § 2000e-2(a)(1) have been refined through case law over the years. Three key Supreme Court cases prior to Bostock had considered the aspect of "sex" in the context of the statute:

- Meritor Savings Bank v. Vinson, 477 U.S. 57 (1986), which ruled that sexual harassment was considered a form of unlawful discrimination under Title VII;
- Price Waterhouse v. Hopkins, 490 U.S. 228 (1989), which determined that gender stereotyping was also a form of discrimination under Title VII and thus unlawful; and
- Oncale v. Sundowner Offshore Services, Inc., 523 U.S. 75 (1998), which further refined Meritor Savings Bank that sexual harassment between members of the same sex was also considered unlawful discrimination.

=== LGBTQ employment protections ===
Until Bostock, whether the Civil Rights Act gave federal protection against employment discrimination to the class of LGBTQ people was in dispute. Individual states since 1973 acted on their own accord to extend employment discrimination protections to explicitly cover LGBTQ employees, and before the Bostock decision, 21 states had included LGBTQ as a protected class against employment discrimination, while other states offered some but less extensive protections in their laws. States with such protections often have a state-level board that performs functions equivalent to the EEOC, and which will work with the EEOC to unify employment discrimination regulations. Numerous local governments passed similar LGBTQ employment discrimination statutes as well.

Since 1994, members of the Democratic Party in the U.S. Congress have introduced some form of the Employment Non-Discrimination Act in nearly every two-year term, which would have amended the Civil Rights Act to include both sexual orientation and gender identity as protected classes under Title VII at the federal level and thus applying across the entire country. Passage of these bills has generally failed because lack of support among Republicans, especially in the House of Representatives. More recently, the Equality Act, expanding the non-discrimination protections to include housing, education, and other areas, was introduced in 2015 and similarly introduced each term, failing to pass due to declining support for LGBTQ rights (and particularly transgender rights) among Republicans since 2013.

The EEOC has used past case law and its evaluation of discrimination cases brought before it to establish that LGBTQ discrimination is unlawful under the context of the Civil Rights Act. In 2012, the EEOC ruled in Macy v. Holder that discrimination on the basis of gender identity is a form of sex stereotyping, and thus prohibited in employment as a form of discrimination on the basis of sex under Title VII of the Civil Rights Act of 1964. In 2015, the EEOC ruled in Baldwin v. Foxx that discrimination on the basis of sexual orientation is also prohibited in employment under Title VII, on the exact same basis as in Macy. The following year, the EEOC filed its first pair of test cases in federal court arguing that sexual orientation is protected by Title VII.

=== Case background ===
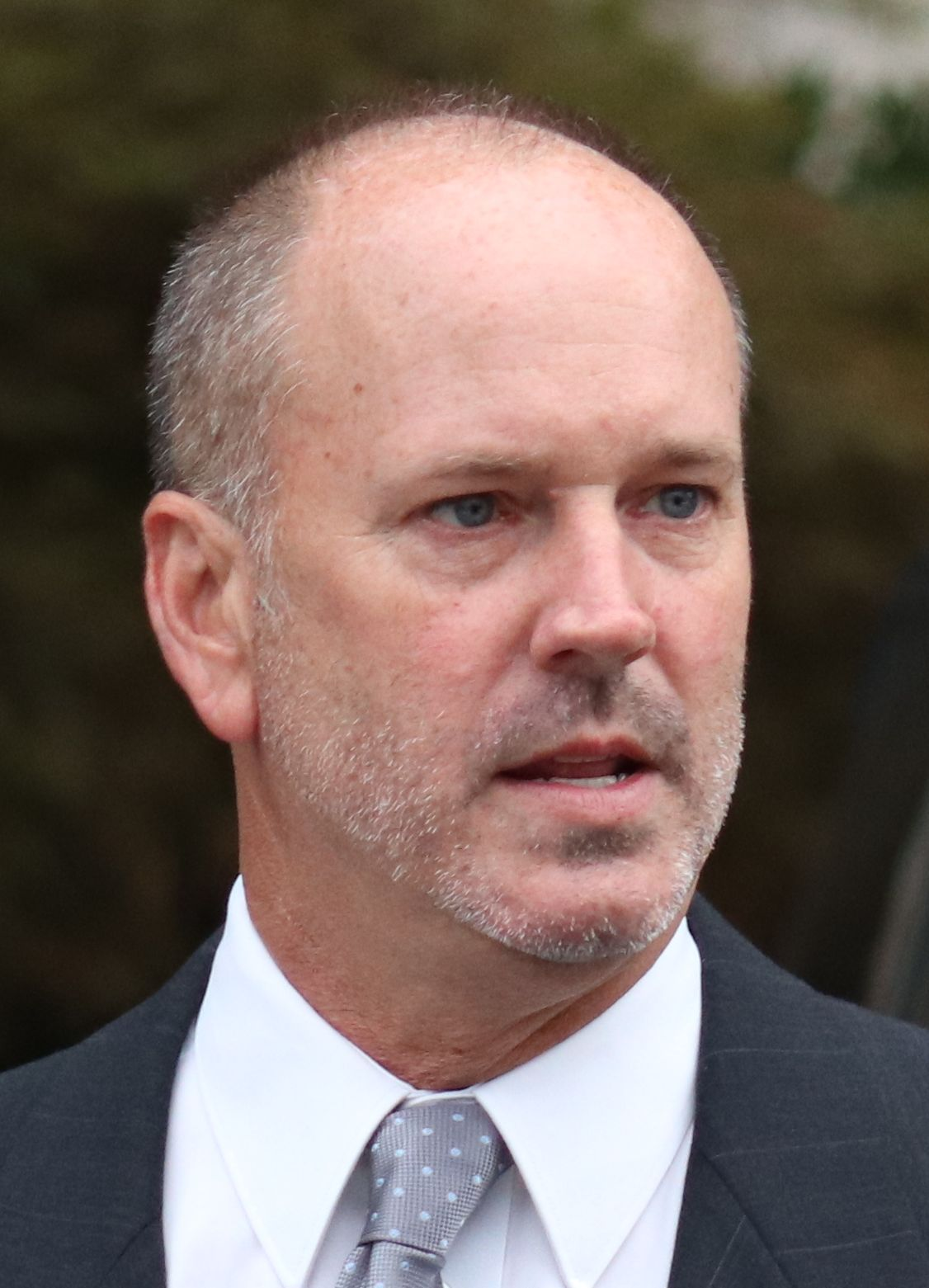
Gerald Bostock at the Supreme Court on October 8, 2019

Gerald Bostock was an employee of Clayton County, within the Atlanta metropolitan area, as an official for its juvenile court system since 2003, with good performance records through the years. In early 2013, he joined a gay softball league and promoted it at work for volunteerism. In April 2013, Clayton County conducted an audit of funds controlled by Bostock and fired him for "conduct unbecoming a county employee". Georgia had no law protecting LGBTQ people from employment discrimination at the time.

Bostock believed that the county used the claim of misspent funds as a pretext for firing him for being gay, and sought legal recourse for workplace discrimination in 2016 in the United States District Court for the Northern District of Georgia. The county sought to dismiss the claim of prohibited discrimination—the District Court agreed to dismiss, on the basis of the precedent established in the 2017 case Evans v. Georgia Regional Hospital decided by the Eleventh Circuit (of which the District is part), which held that the Civil Rights Act's Title VII does not include protection against discrimination towards sexual orientation.

==== Circuit split ====
Bostock appealed to the Eleventh Circuit, where the three-judge panel affirmed the District Court's ruling in 2018. The Eleventh Circuit relied on two prior cases: its previous ruling in Evans, and Blum v. Gulf Oil Corp. from the Fifth Circuit in 1976. In upholding the ruling, the Eleventh Circuit pointed to their ruling in Evans that dismissed the Supreme Court's precedent against sex discrimination set by Price Waterhouse and Oncale.

The Eleventh Circuit's ruling in Evans furthered a circuit split, as it conflicted with that of the Seventh Circuit in Hively v. Ivy Tech Community College of Indiana (2017) in which, by an 8–3 decision, the Circuit found that discrimination in employment on the basis of sexual orientation violated Title VII. The Second Circuit came to the same conclusion in Zarda v. Altitude Express, Inc. (2018) (Altitude Express) by a 10–3 vote en banc. Thus the Eleventh Circuit, on the one hand, and the Second and Seventh Circuits, on the other, were divided on the question of the interpretation of Title VII. These cases and a related case, R.G. & G.R. Harris Funeral Homes Inc. v. Equal Employment Opportunity Commission, (Harris Funeral Homes), in which the Sixth Circuit found Title VII also covered transgender employment discrimination, set the stage for the Supreme Court's decision in Bostock.

== Supreme Court ==
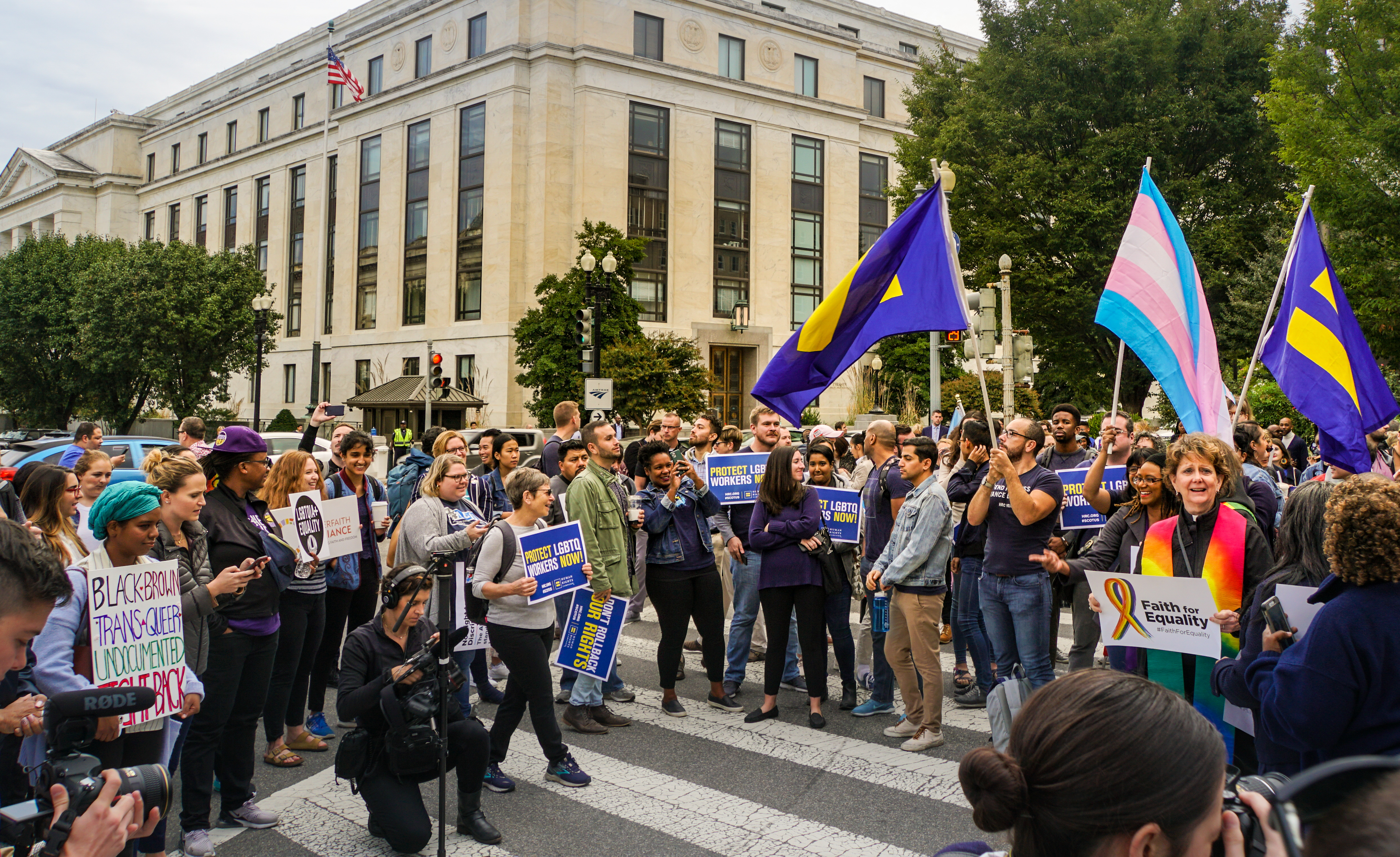
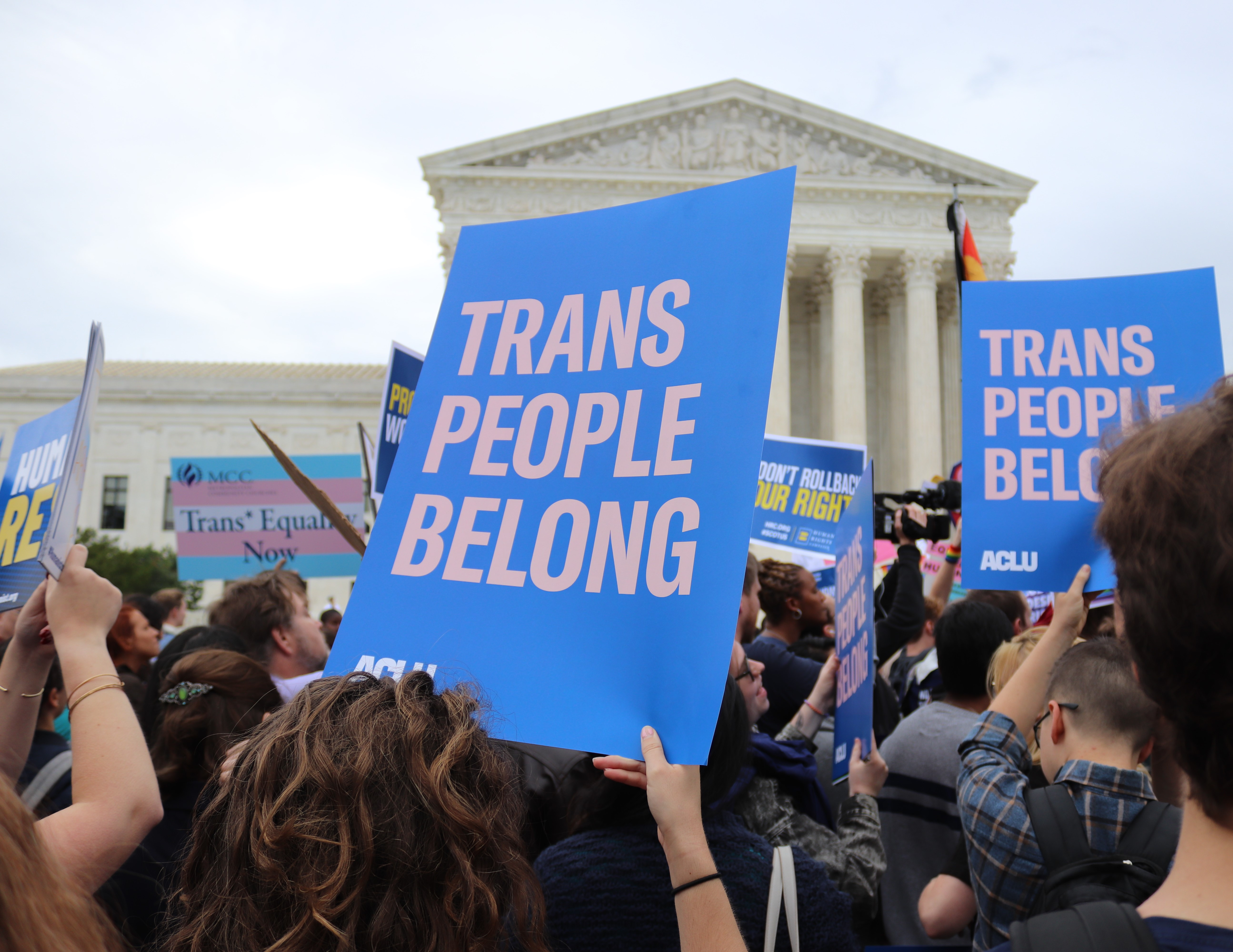
Rallies outside of the Supreme Court building on October 8, 2019, the day of the oral hearing in the Bostock case

Bostock petitioned the Supreme Court for a writ of certiorari on the question of whether sexual orientation is covered by Title VII of the Civil Rights Act. The Supreme Court granted the petition in April 2019, and consolidated the case with Altitude Express. Between these cases, as well as prior Circuit court decisions, there had been a split of opinions on whether sexual orientation discrimination is covered by Title VII. The combined Bostock and Altitude Express cases drew numerous amicus curiae briefs. Over thirty-six briefs were filed in support of Bostock and the estate of Zarda, including one signed by over 200 major corporations such as Amazon, the Walt Disney Company, and Coca-Cola, that asserted that it would not be "unreasonably costly or burdensome" for them to accept sexual orientation as a protected class under Title VII. Over 25 briefs were filed to support Clayton County and Altitude Express; among them, the U.S. Department of Justice argued that sexual orientation was not covered, but asserted, "Congress of course remains free to legislate in this area; and employers, including governmental employers, remain free to offer greater protections to their workers than Title VII requires."

Oral arguments in the consolidated cases were heard on October 8, 2019, alongside the arguments in Harris Funeral Homes, the case related to Title VII protections for transgender individuals. Just prior to the hearings, police from the District of Columbia had discovered two suspicious packages near the Supreme Court building and temporarily cleared the plaza of arriving supporters to remove the packages. In oral arguments, the statutory claims centered on the discrimination "because of ... sex" language of the Civil Rights Act of 1964.

Andrée Sophia Blumstein, the Solicitor General of Tennessee, predicted that the Supreme Court would make a consequential decision in this case because of the sensitivity of the issue and the Constitutional implications. In an article before oral arguments, Blumstein stated that the decision would determine whether the Supreme Court would remain solely as the "expositor of the law" or become the policymakers alongside Congress.

=== Decision ===
==== Majority opinion ====
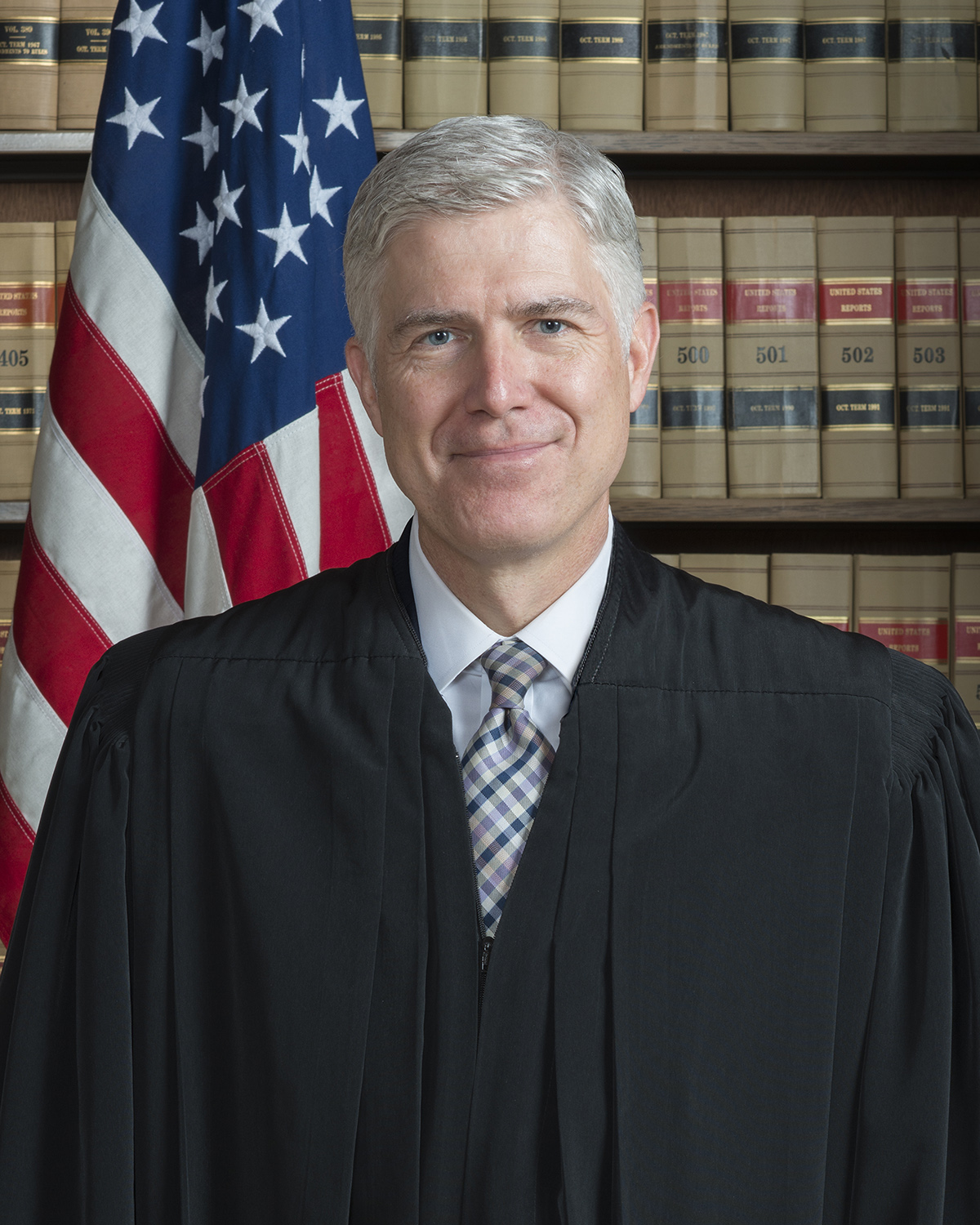
Justice Neil Gorsuch delivered the opinion of the Court.

Justice Neil Gorsuch delivered the opinion of the Court in this case on June 15, 2020. In a 6–3 decision, the Court held that Title VII protections pursuant to § 2000e-2(a)(1) did extend to cover sexual orientation and gender identity. The decision then involved the statutory interpretation of Title VII (specifically the original meaning of "sex"), not constitutional law as in other recent landmark cases involving the rights of LGBTQ individuals such as Obergefell v. Hodges. The Court further held that Title VII protections against sex discrimination in the employment context apply to discrimination against particular individuals on the basis of sex, as opposed to discrimination against groups. Thus, Title VII provides a remedy to individuals who experience discrimination on the basis of sex even if an employer's policy on the whole does not involve discrimination. Gorsuch wrote:

An employer who fires an individual for being homosexual or transgender fires that person for traits or actions it would not have questioned in members of a different sex. Sex plays a necessary and undisguisable role in the decision, exactly what Title VII forbids. Those who adopted the Civil Rights Act might not have anticipated their work would lead to this particular result. But the limits of the drafters' imagination supply no reason to ignore the law's demands. Only the written word is the law, and all persons are entitled to its benefit.

In his opinion, Gorsuch wrote, "it is irrelevant what an employer might call its discriminatory practice, how others might label it, or what else might motivate it." He referenced Phillips v. Martin Marietta Corp., in which a company refused to hire women with young children; and City of L.A. Dep't of Water & Power v. Manhart, in which an employer required women to make larger pension fund contributions than did men, on the premise that women on average live longer than men do. Both cases violated Title VII, and Gorsuch wrote, "just as labels and additional intentions or motivations didn't make a difference in Manhart or Phillips, they cannot make a difference here."

Gorsuch's decision also alluded to concerns that the judgment may set a sweeping precedent that would force gender equality on traditional practices. "They say sex-segregated bathrooms, locker rooms, and dress codes will prove unsustainable after our decision today but none of these other laws are before us; we have not had the benefit of adversarial testing about the meaning of their terms, and we do not prejudge any such question today."

==== Dissents ====
Justice Samuel Alito wrote a dissent, joined by Justice Clarence Thomas. In his dissent, Alito asserted that at the time of the crafting of the Civil Rights Act in 1964 the concepts of sexual orientation and transgender identity would have been unknown, and thus Congress's language should not be implied to cover these facets. Alito wrote, "Many will applaud today's decision because they agree on policy grounds with the Court's updating of Title VII. But the question in these cases is not whether discrimination because of sexual orientation or gender identity should be outlawed. The question is whether Congress did that in 1964. It indisputably did not." Alito further stated that "even if discrimination based on sexual orientation or gender identity could be squeezed into some arcane understanding of sex discrimination, the context in which Title VII was enacted would tell us that this is not what the statute's terms were understood to mean at that time." Alito was critical of the majority decision:

There is only one word for what the Court has done today: legislation. The document that the Court releases is in the form of a judicial opinion interpreting a statute, but that is deceptive ... A more brazen abuse of our authority to interpret statutes is hard to recall. The Court tries to convince readers that it is merely enforcing the terms of the statute, but that is preposterous.

Justice Brett Kavanaugh wrote a separate dissent, arguing that the Court could not add sexual orientation or gender identity to Title VII due to the separation of powers, leaving this responsibility to Congress. He concluded by acknowledging that

Millions of gay and lesbian Americans have worked hard for many decades to achieve equal treatment in fact and law ... They have advanced powerful policy arguments and can take pride in today's result. Under the Constitution's separation of powers, however, I believe that it was Congress's role, not this Court's, to amend Title VII.

== Reactions ==
The Supreme Court ruling was seen as a major victory by proponents of LGBTQ rights. Sarah Kate Ellis, the CEO of GLAAD, stated that the "Court's historic decision affirms what shouldn't have even been a debate: LGBT Americans should be able to work without fear of losing jobs because of who they are". The Human Rights Campaign praised the decision, with the HRC President, Alphonso David, stating: "This is a landmark victory for LGBT equality. No one should be denied a job or fired simply because of who they are or whom they love. For the past two decades, federal courts have determined that discrimination on the basis of LGBT status is unlawful discrimination under federal law. Today's historic ruling by the Supreme Court affirms that view, but there is still work left to be done. In many aspects of the public square, LGBT people still lack non-discrimination protections, which is why it is crucial that Congress pass the Equality Act to address the significant gaps in federal civil rights laws and improve protections for everyone". Torie Osborn stated that the decision in Bostock represented a more significant advance than same-sex marriage, calling it a "watershed". Ken Mehlman took the decision as evidence that conservatism is not inconsistent with support for LGBTQ rights.

Legal scholars saw the ruling as having an impact beyond employment, extending to areas such as education, health care, housing and financial credit. Attorney Paul Smith, who argued Lawrence v. Texas (2003), said, "[a]ny law, and I think there are dozens, that says you can't discriminate because of sex is going to have a reckoning with this ruling"; indeed, Alito's dissent in Bostock notes that "[o]ver 100 federal statutes prohibit discrimination because of sex". American Civil Liberties Union lawyer Joshua Block said, "[a]ll of the Trump administration's actions ['curtailing protections for transgender Americans'] have been built around this assertion that Title VII [of the Civil Rights Act] and Title IX [of the Education Amendments of 1972] provide no protections to LGBTQ people ... [i]t's an Achilles' heel that's been built into every single thing they've done."

Some Christian conservatives, including Russell D. Moore and Franklin Graham, expressed concern that the decision would impact religious freedoms and affect faith-based employment, but Gorsuch's opinion said that the scope of how this decision intersects with past precedent for religious freedom would likely be the subject of future cases at the Court. Archbishop José Horacio Gómez, president of the United States Conference of Catholic Bishops (which had filed an amicus brief (friend of the court) against Bostock), called the ruling an "injustice" and said he was "deeply concerned that the U.S. Supreme Court has effectively redefined the legal meaning of 'sex' in our nation's civil rights law". Franklin Graham said it was "a very sad day". Dan McLaughlin of the National Review postulated that Dixiecrat Howard W. Smith's insertion of the word "sex" in Title VII of the Civil Rights Act of 1964 had inadvertently protected sexual orientation and gender identity from employment discrimination.

Gerald Bostock, the only surviving plaintiff from all three cases, stated that he was "proud to take part in a role to get us to this historic moment". The Supreme Court decision remanded his case to be reheard at the District Court.

Some legal scholars have expressed disappointment that the Supreme Court did not define the terms "transgender" or "gay" in its ruling, leaving doubt about who is covered by them. In the Connecticut Law Review, Mercer University law professor Pamela Wilkins wrote that the Court's decision regarding transgender people uses only examples in which someone identified as male or female and "does not address whether Title VII protects transgender non-binary individuals who identify as something other than exclusively male and female." Legal scholars have also debated whether the term "gay" in Title VII includes bisexual people.

=== Political ===
Many politicians across the political spectrum praised the ruling. Speaker Nancy Pelosi said that the ruling "secures critical protections for LGBT Americans across the country". Republican Senator Rob Portman of Ohio stated that the ruling was "a big deal" and emphasized that people should not be fired simply because of their sexual orientation. Some politicians, however, were critical of the ruling, such as Missouri Senator Josh Hawley, who argued that the ruling was simply "policymaking". President Donald Trump neither praised nor criticized the ruling, and stated in response to the decision that "some people were surprised" but said that the court had "ruled and we live with their decision". He called the decision "very powerful".

=== Gorsuch and textualism ===
There was some surprise that Gorsuch, a conservative-leaning Trump appointee, wrote the majority opinion supporting LGBTQ employment rights. Some commentators claimed that his opinion was consistent with his textualism in statutory interpretation of the plain meaning of laws in general, while others asserted otherwise. Gorsuch wrote much on textualism in his book A Republic, If You Can Keep It, published in mid-2019, and some of his questioning at the oral hearings drew on using textual interpretation of the law.

Alito's dissent fundamentally denied that Gorsuch's opinion employed textualism. He argued that the majority opinion went beyond the plain language of the law to claim that its intent in 1964 covered sexual orientation and gender identity as part of the meaning of "sex" in the statute. Alito called the majority's decision a "pirate ship", in that "It sails under a textualist flag, but what it actually represents is a theory of statutory interpretation that Justice Scalia excoriated—the theory that courts should 'update' old statutes so that they better reflect the current values of society."

In a Slate article, Mark Joseph Stern wrote that Gorsuch's argument "rests on textualism" and described it as "remarkably dismissive" of Alito's dissenting opinion. Stern agreed with Gorsuch, writing, "Alito does not want the court to stretch Title VII beyond its application—as expected by Congress in 1964—and that approach is not textualism", adding that Alito's opinion "elevates the alleged mental processes of long-dead lawmakers over the ordinary meaning of words". Michael D. Shear, a White House correspondent for The New York Times, wrote, "Justice Gorsuch employed a fundamentally conservative principle—a literal reading of the words of a statute—to reach a decision that contrasts sharply with the conclusions of the other conservative justices on the court". Carrie Severino, the president of the conservative Judicial Crisis Network and a former law clerk of Justice Thomas, said, "Justice Scalia would be disappointed that his successor has bungled textualism so badly today, for the sake of appealing to college campuses and editorial boards".

The religious journal First Things editor R. R. Reno called the opinion unworkable sophistry, comparing it to Dred Scott v. Sandford: "Historians may look back and judge Bostock the twenty-first-century analogue to Dred Scott, the Supreme Court decision that imposed the Southern slave regime on the entire country and contributed to the intolerable contradictions that led to the Civil War. Gorsuch's majority opinion leaves no wiggle room. It ties affirmations of homosexuality and transgenderism to our most basic conceptions of equality. And it does so by denying that there are any moral, legal, or even metaphysical differences between men and women."

Jonathan Skrmetti, Chief Deputy Attorney General of Tennessee (which, with a number of other states, had filed an amicus brief on behalf of the employers in Bostock), observed that all three opinions in Bostock adopted a textualist approach. Echoing a comment made by Justice Elena Kagan in memorializing Scalia, Skrmetti argued that Bostock shows "we really are all textualists now". He characterized Gorsuch's majority opinion in Bostock as "glorifying textualism in its narrowest literalist conception". Gorsuch's majority opinion, Skrmetti argues, means that this "narrow" form of textualism—which, on Skrmetti's view, does not look to legislative history or other potential sources of the meaning of the statute—is now ascendant. But Skrmetti notes that where a statute is ambiguous, such tools might still be available to judges in interpreting statutes.

== Aftermath ==
On January 20, 2021, after his inauguration as president, Joe Biden issued Executive Order 13988, which built on Bostock by requiring the federal government to interpret Title VII as protecting against discrimination on the basis of sexual orientation or gender identity. The Executive Order on Preventing and Combating Discrimination on the Basis of Gender Identity or Sexual Orientation also required that federal agencies include discrimination on the basis of sexuality and gender if a federal anti-discrimination statute covers sex discrimination. In April 2024, the EEOC amended its rules defining workplace harassment to include harassment of LGBQT people, including transgender people over pronoun preference or using the bathroom aligned with their gender.

On January 20, 2025, the first day of his second term as president, Trump rescinded the order and issued Executive Order 14168, which instructs the federal government to recognize only "sex", not gender, defined as an immutable male-female binary assigned at conception, and prohibits promotion or funding of "gender ideology". The order also instructs the Attorney General to reevaluate Bostock, arguing that it was misapplied. The EEOC sought to reverse its April 2024 rule change to comply with this new executive order, but, as Trump had fired the EEOC's two Democratic commissioners in January 2025, the EEOC lacked a quorum to do so.

In August 2024, the state of Texas and the Heritage Foundation filed a lawsuit challenging the rules on the basis that they forced businesses to recognize transgender people and override state mandates on respecting their stance on biological sexes. Federal district judge Matthew J. Kacsmaryk of the Northern District of Texas ruled in favor of the state in May 2025, saying that the EEOC exceeded its statutory authority in creating the new rules. Kacsmaryk read Bostock narrowly, writing that it "firmly refused to expand the definition of 'sex' beyond the biological binary" and thus could be used to prevent discrimination only when firing transgender people; per Kacsmaryk, Bostock did not cover aspects like preferred gender, bathroom use, or dress codes.

== See also ==
- List of LGBTQ-related cases in the United States Supreme Court
- 2019 term opinions of the Supreme Court of the United States
- Gender-based dress codes
- LGBTQ rights in the United States
