= List of LGBTQ-related cases in the United States Supreme Court =

LGBTQ-related cases before the U.S. Supreme Court

This article outlines cases related to LGBTQ issues that have been brought before the Supreme Court of the United States.

== One, Inc. v. Olesen (1958) ==
One, Inc. v. Olesen, 355 U.S. 371 (1958), is a landmark decision of the US Supreme Court for LGBTQ rights in the United States. It was the first U.S. Supreme Court ruling to deal with homosexuality and the first to address free speech rights with respect to homosexuality. The Supreme Court reversed a lower court ruling that the gay magazine ONE violated obscenity laws, thus upholding constitutional protection for pro-homosexual writing.

== Manual Enterprises, Inc. v. Day (1962) ==
MANual Enterprises, Inc. v. Day, 370 U.S. 478 (1962), is a decision by the Supreme Court of the United States in which the Court held that magazines consisting largely of photographs of nude or near-nude male models are not considered "obscene" within the meaning of 18 U.S.C. § 1461, which prohibits the mailing of obscene material. It was the first case in which the Court engaged in plenary review of a Post Office Department order holding obscene matter "nonmailable".

The case is notable for its ruling that photographs of nude men are not obscene, an implication which opened the U.S. mail to nude male pornographic magazines, especially those catering to gay men.

== Boutilier v. Immigration and Naturalization Service (1967) ==
Boutilier v. Immigration and Naturalization Service, 387 U.S. 118 (1967), was a United States Supreme Court case in which the Court upheld Clive Michael Boutilier's deportation from the United States under the Immigration and Nationality Act of 1952 due to his history of homosexual activities. The Act itself did not specify homosexuality among its exclusion criteria, but the Court held that Congress clearly intended that a homosexual individual be excluded from entry into the United States as one "afflicted with [a] psychopathic personality." The decision was abrogated by the Immigration Act of 1990, which rejected sexual orientation as a basis for excluding an individual from immigration.

== Baker v. Nelson (1971) ==
In 1972, the Supreme Court dismissed the case of Baker v. Nelson, which effectively denied that homosexual couples have a constitutional right to get married. This ruling was later overturned in Obergefell v. Hodges.

== Doe v. Commonwealth's Attorney of Richmond (1976) ==
Two gay men anonymously challenged Virginia's sodomy law, arguing that the law violated constitutional rights guaranteed by the First, Fifth, Eighth, and Fourteenth Amendments. In Doe v. Commonwealth's Attorney of Richmond, a three-judge panel on the Eastern District of Virginia ruled, by 2 to 1, that the statute was not unconstitutional. On March 29, 1976, the Supreme Court summarily affirmed the decision without oral argument or written decision. Justices Brennan, Thurgood Marshall, and John Paul Stevens noted that they would have set the case for full consideration.

== National Gay Task Force v. Board of Education (1985) ==
National Gay Task Force v. Board of Education of the City of Oklahoma City, Oklahoma, 729 F.2d 1270 (10th Cir. 1984), was a decision by the Court of Appeals for the Tenth Circuit that upheld in part, and struck down in part, a law allowing schools to fire teachers for public homosexual conduct. It was the first federal appellate court decision to deny that sexual orientation is a suspect classification. It was affirmed by an equally divided vote in the United States Supreme Court.

== Bowers v. Hardwick (1986) ==
An openly gay man challenged the sodomy law of Georgia based on an arrest he experienced in early July 1982 in his home in Atlanta. Michael Hardwick won this case in the Court of Appeals for the Eleventh Circuit. The Circuit Court reasoned that because the Supreme Court had found there to be constitutional rights to childrearing and education, procreation, marriage, contraception, and abortion, it was inevitable that there is a constitutional right to private, consensual sodomy as well. Mike Bowers, the Attorney General of Georgia, appealed to the Supreme Court.

By five to four, the highest court overturned the 11th Circuit Court's decision in Bowers v. Hardwick. Justice Harry Blackmun, who in the previous case of Doe (see above) voted to uphold the Virginia ban on sodomy, now voted to strike down the Georgia ban, joining the three who dissented from Doe. Justice White wrote the majority opinion; Chief Justice Warren E. Burger and Lewis F. Powell wrote concurring opinions; also silently supporting the White opinion were William Rehnquist (soon to become the Chief Justice) and Sandra Day O'Connor. White used three modes of analysis in determining whether sodomy was constitutionally protected: 1) precedents dealing with childrearing and education, procreation, marriage, contraception, and abortion (as the 11th Circuit Court outlined), 2) the plausibility of finding that there is a fundamental right to engage in sodomy, and 3) rational basis review. White rejected Hardwick's claim with all three modes.

"We first register our disagreement with the Court of Appeals and with [Hardwick] that the Court's prior cases have construed the Constitution to confer a right of privacy that extends to homosexual sodomy and, for all intents and purposes, have decided this case." "Accepting the decisions in these cases, ... we think it evident that none of the rights announced in those cases bears any resemblance to the claimed constitutional right of homosexuals to engage in acts of sodomy that is asserted in this case. No connection between family, marriage, or procreation, on the one hand, and homosexual activity, on the other, has been demonstrated, either by the Court of Appeals or by [Hardwick]."

Next, White rejected the prospect that the Court could "announce, as the Court of Appeals did, a fundamental right to engage in homosexual sodomy. This we are quite unwilling to do." He canvassed the history of sodomy laws in the United States: "Proscriptions against that conduct have ancient roots. Sodomy was a criminal offense at common law, and was forbidden by the laws of the original 13 States when they ratified the Bill of Rights. In 1868, when the Fourteenth Amendment was ratified, all but 5 of the 37 States in the union had criminal sodomy laws. ... Against this background, to claim that a right to engage in such conduct is 'deeply rooted in this Nation's history and tradition' or 'implicit in the concept of ordered liberty' is, at best, facetious." And White emphasized that the Court should exercise judicial restraint when possibly pronouncing a new "fundamental right."

Nor are we inclined to take a more expansive view of our authority to discover new fundamental rights imbedded in the Due Process Clause. The Court is most vulnerable and comes nearest to illegitimacy when it deals with judge-made constitutional law having little or no cognizable roots in the language or design of the Constitution. That this is so was painfully demonstrated by the face-off between the Executive and the Court in the 1930's, which resulted in the repudiation of much of the substantive gloss that the Court had placed on the Due Process Clauses of the Fifth and Fourteenth Amendments. There should be, therefore, great resistance to expand the substantive reach of those Clauses, particularly if it requires redefining the category of rights deemed to be fundamental. Otherwise, the Judiciary necessarily takes to itself further authority to govern the country without express constitutional authority.

The last mode of analysis was the rational basis test. Hardwick had asserted "that there must be a rational basis for the law, and that there is none in this case other than the presumed belief of a majority of the electorate in Georgia that homosexual sodomy is immoral and unacceptable. This is said to be an inadequate rationale to support the law. The law, however, is constantly based on notions of morality, and if all laws representing essentially moral choices are to be invalidated under the Due Process Clause, the courts will be very busy indeed."

== Webster v. Doe (1988) ==
Webster v. Doe, 486 U.S. 592 (1988), is a case decided by the United States Supreme Court that presented statutory and constitutional claims by a former CIA employee who alleged that his termination was the result of discrimination based on sexual orientation.

== Wisconsin v. Mitchell (1993) ==
Wisconsin v. Mitchell, 508 U.S. 476 (1993), was a case in which the United States Supreme Court held that enhanced penalties for hate crimes do not violate criminal defendants' First Amendment rights. It was a landmark precedent pertaining to First Amendment free speech arguments for hate crime legislation. In effect, the Court ruled that a state may consider whether a crime was committed or initially considered due to an intended victim's status in a protected class.

== Farmer v. Brennan (1994) ==
Farmer v. Brennan, 511 U.S. 825 (1994), was a case in which the Supreme Court of the United States ruled that a prison official's "deliberate indifference" to a substantial risk of serious harm to an inmate violates the cruel and unusual punishment clause of the Eighth Amendment. Farmer built on two previous Supreme Court decisions addressing prison conditions, Estelle v. Gamble and Wilson v. Seiter. The decision marked the first time the Supreme Court directly addressed sexual assault in prisons.

== Hurley v. Irish-American Gay, Lesbian, and Bisexual Group of Boston (1995) ==
Hurley v. Irish-American Gay, Lesbian, and Bisexual Group of Boston, 515 U.S. 557 (1995), is a landmark decision of the U.S. Supreme Court regarding free speech rights, specifically the rights of groups to determine what message their activities convey to the public. The Court held that a state may not compel private citizens organizing a public demonstration to include groups who impart a message the organizers do not want their demonstration to present, even if the state's intent was to prevent discrimination.

== Romer v. Evans (1996) ==
Romer v. Evans, 517 U.S. 620 (1996), is a landmark decision of the Supreme Court of the United States case which held that a state constitutional amendment in Colorado preventing protected status based upon homosexuality or bisexuality violated the Equal Protection Clause. The majority opinion in Romer stated that the amendment lacked "a rational relationship to legitimate state interests", and the dissent stated that the majority "evidently agrees that 'rational basis'—the normal test for compliance with the Equal Protection Clause—is the governing standard". The state constitutional amendment failed rational basis review.

Romer was the first Supreme Court decision to address gay rights since Bowers v. Hardwick (1986), when the Court had upheld laws criminalizing sodomy as constitutional. The decision in Romer set the stage for three subsequent landmark decisions regarding LGBT civil rights: Lawrence v. Texas (2003), where the Court overruled Bowers; United States v. Windsor (2013), where the Court struck down Section 3 of the Defense of Marriage Act; and Obergefell v. Hodges (2015), where the Court struck down state bans on same-sex marriage. Justice Anthony Kennedy authored all four opinions, and was joined by Justices Ruth Bader Ginsburg and Stephen Breyer in each one.

== Oncale v. Sundowner Offshore Services, Inc. (1998) ==
Oncale v. Sundowner Offshore Services, 523 U.S. 75 (1998), is a landmark decision of the US Supreme Court. The case arose out of a suit for sex discrimination by a male oil-rig worker, who claimed that he was repeatedly subjected to sexual harassment by his male co-workers with the acquiescence of his employer. The Court held that the protection of Title VII of the Civil Rights Act of 1964 against workplace discrimination "because of... sex" applied to harassment in the workplace between members of the same sex.

== Boy Scouts of America v. Dale (2000) ==
Boy Scouts of America et al. v. Dale, 530 U.S. 640 (2000), is a landmark decision of the U.S. Supreme Court, decided on June 28, 2000, which held that the constitutional right to freedom of association allowed the Boy Scouts of America (BSA) to exclude a homosexual person from membership in spite of a state law requiring equal treatment of homosexuals in public accommodations. More generally, the court ruled that a private organization such as the BSA may exclude a person from membership when "the presence of that person affects in a significant way the group's ability to advocate public or private viewpoints". In a 5–4 decision, the Supreme Court ruled that opposition to homosexuality is part of BSA's "expressive message" and that allowing homosexuals as adult leaders would interfere with that message.

The ruling reversed a decision of the New Jersey Supreme Court that had determined that New Jersey's public accommodations law required the BSA to readmit assistant Scoutmaster James Dale, who had come out and whom the BSA had expelled from the organization for that reason. Subsequently, the BSA lifted its bans on gay scouts and gay leaders in 2013 and 2015, respectively.

== Lawrence v. Texas (2003) ==
Lawrence v. Texas, 539 U.S. 558 (2003), is a landmark decision of the United States Supreme Court in which the Court ruled that U.S. state laws criminalizing sodomy between consenting adults are unconstitutional. (Note: The judgment does not recognize a constitutional right to certain sexual activities such as prostitution, bestiality, and incest, due to other metrics, such as the perceived inherent harm that these activities carry.) The Court reaffirmed the concept of a "right to privacy" that earlier cases had found the United States Constitution provides, even though it is not explicitly enumerated. It based its ruling on the notions of personal autonomy to define one's own relationships and of American traditions of non-interference with any or all forms of private sexual activities between consenting adults.

In 1998, John Geddes Lawrence Jr. was arrested along with Tyron Garner at Lawrence's apartment in Harris County, Texas. Garner's former boyfriend had called the police, claiming that there was a man with a weapon in the apartment. Sheriff's deputies said they found the men engaging in sexual intercourse. Lawrence and Garner were charged with a misdemeanor under Texas' anti-sodomy law; both pleaded no contest and received a fine. Assisted by the American civil rights organization Lambda Legal, Lawrence and Garner appealed their sentences to the Texas Courts of Appeals, which ruled in 2000 that the sodomy law was unconstitutional. Texas appealed to have the court rehear the case en banc, and in 2001 it overturned its prior judgment and upheld the law. Lawrence appealed this decision to the Texas Court of Criminal Appeals, which denied his request for appeal. Lawrence then appealed to the U.S. Supreme Court, which agreed to hear his case.

The Supreme Court struck down the sodomy law in Texas in a 6–3 decision, and by extension invalidated sodomy laws in 13 other states, thus protecting from governmental regulation throughout the U.S. all forms of private, consensual sexual activity between adults. In the same case, the Court overturned its previous ruling in the 1986 case Bowers v. Hardwick, where it had upheld a challenged Georgia statute and did not find a constitutional protection of sexual privacy. It explicitly overruled Bowers, holding that the previous ruling had viewed the liberty interest too narrowly. The Court held that intimate consensual sexual conduct was part of the liberty protected by substantive due process under the Due Process Clause of the Fourteenth Amendment to the U.S. Constitution.

The case attracted much public attention, and 33 amici curiae ("friends of the court") briefs were filed. Its outcome was celebrated by gay rights advocates, and set the stage for further reconsideration of standing law, including the landmark cases of United States v. Windsor (2013), which invalidated Section 3 of the Defense of Marriage Act, and Obergefell v. Hodges (2015), which recognized same-sex marriage as a fundamental right under the United States Constitution.

== Snyder v. Phelps (2011) ==
Snyder v. Phelps, 562 U.S. 443 (2011), is a landmark decision by the Supreme Court of the United States in which the Court held that speech made in a public place on a matter of public concern cannot be the basis of liability for a tort of emotional distress, even if the speech is viewed as offensive or outrageous.

On March 10, 2006, seven members of the Westboro Baptist Church (WBC), led by the church's founder Fred Phelps, picketed the funeral of U.S. Marine Matthew Snyder, who was killed in a non-combat accident during the Iraq War. On public land about 1,000 feet from where the funeral was being held, protesters displayed placards that read "Thank God for Dead Soldiers", "God Hates Fags", and "You're Going to Hell", among others. Snyder's father, Albert Snyder, filed a lawsuit seeking damages from Phelps and the Westboro Baptist Church, claiming that their picketing was meant to intentionally inflict emotional distress. Phelps defended the picketing as an appropriate use of their right to free speech and right to peacefully protest as protected by the First Amendment to the U.S. Constitution.

The United States District Court for the District of Maryland ruled in Snyder's favor and awarded him a total of $10.9 million in damages, but the Fourth Circuit Court of Appeals reversed, holding that the protesters' signs were "rhetorical hyperbole" and "figurative expression" and were therefore protected speech under the First Amendment. On further appeal, the U.S. Supreme Court also ruled in favor of Phelps, holding that speech made in a public place on a matter of public concern cannot be the basis for a claim of tort liability for intentional infliction of emotional distress. In an 8–1 decision delivered by Chief Justice John Roberts, the Court wrote that the First Amendment "shield[s] Westboro from tort liability for its picketing" because the speech was made on a matter of public concern and did not disrupt the funeral. The First Amendment provides special protection to public issues because it serves "the principle that debate on public issues should be uninhibited, robust, and wide-open."

== Hollingsworth v. Perry (2013) ==
Hollingsworth v. Perry was a series of United States federal court cases that reinstated same-sex marriage in the state of California. The case began in 2009 in the U.S. District Court for the Northern District of California, which found that banning same-sex marriage violates equal protection under the law. This decision overturned California ballot initiative Proposition 8, which had banned same-sex marriage. After the State of California refused to defend Proposition 8, the official sponsors of Proposition 8 intervened and appealed to the Supreme Court. The case was litigated during the governorships of both Arnold Schwarzenegger and Jerry Brown, and was thus known as Perry v. Schwarzenegger and Perry v. Brown, respectively. As Hollingsworth v. Perry, it eventually reached the United States Supreme Court, which held that, in line with prior precedent, the official sponsors of a ballot initiative measure did not have Article III standing to appeal an adverse federal court ruling when the state refused to do so. The effect of the ruling was that same-sex marriage in California resumed under the district court trial decision from 2010.

== United States v. Windsor (2013) ==
United States v. Windsor, 570 U.S. 744 (2013), is a landmark United States Supreme Court civil rights case concerning same-sex marriage. The Court held that Section 3 of the Defense of Marriage Act (DOMA), which denied federal recognition of same-sex marriages, was a violation of the Due Process Clause of the Fifth Amendment to the United States Constitution.

Edith Windsor and Thea Spyer, a same-sex couple residing in New York, had their marriage recognized by the state of New York in 2008; Spyer died in 2009, leaving her entire estate to Windsor. Windsor sought to claim the federal estate tax exemption for surviving spouses, but was barred from doing so by Section 3 of DOMA. Seeking a refund, Windsor sued the federal government in the U.S. District Court for the Southern District of New York. As the Department of Justice declined to defend the constitutionality of Section 3 of DOMA, the Bipartisan Legal Advisory Group (BLAG) intervened to defend the law. District Judge Barbara S. Jones ruled that Section 3 of DOMA was unconstitutional, and her ruling was affirmed by the U.S. Court of Appeals for the Second Circuit.

The Supreme Court granted certiorari in December 2012 and handed down its judgment on June 26, 2013. In the majority opinion, which was joined by four other justices, Justice Anthony Kennedy declared Section 3 of DOMA to be unconstitutional "as a deprivation of the liberty of the person protected by the Fifth Amendment". He further wrote: "The federal statute is invalid, for no legitimate purpose overcomes the purpose and effect to disparage and to injure those whom the State, by its marriage laws, sought to protect in personhood and dignity." Four justices filed dissenting opinions, including Justice Antonin Scalia, who argued that the Court had "no power under the Constitution to invalidate this democratically adopted legislation".

On the same day, the Court also issued a separate 5–4 decision in Hollingsworth v. Perry that effectively allowed same-sex marriage in California to resume. Following the decision, the Obama administration began to extend other federal rights, privileges, and benefits to married same-sex couples. Two years later, in the case of Obergefell v. Hodges (2015), the Court struck down all state bans on same-sex marriage, ruling that marriage is guaranteed to same-sex couples by both the Due Process Clause and the Equal Protection Clause.

== Obergefell v. Hodges (2015) ==
Obergefell v. Hodges, 576 U.S. 644 (2015) (/ˈoʊbərɡəfɛl/ OH-bər-gə-fel), is a landmark decision of the United States Supreme Court which ruled that the fundamental right to marry is guaranteed to same-sex couples by both the Due Process Clause and the Equal Protection Clause of the Fourteenth Amendment to the United States Constitution. The 5–4 ruling requires all 50 states, the District of Columbia, and the Insular Areas under U.S. sovereignty to perform and recognize the marriages of same-sex couples on the same terms and conditions as the marriages of opposite-sex couples, with equal rights and responsibilities. Prior to Obergefell, same-sex marriage had already been established by statute, court ruling, or voter initiative in 36 states, the District of Columbia, and Guam.

Between January 2012 and February 2014, plaintiffs in Michigan, Ohio, Kentucky, and Tennessee filed federal district court cases that culminated in Obergefell v. Hodges. After all district courts ruled for the plaintiffs, the rulings were appealed to the Sixth Circuit. In November 2014, following a series of appeals court rulings that year from the Fourth, Seventh, Ninth, and Tenth Circuits that state-level bans on same-sex marriage were unconstitutional, the Sixth Circuit ruled that it was bound by Baker v. Nelson and found such bans to be constitutional. This created a split between circuits and led to a Supreme Court review. Decided on June 26, 2015, Obergefell overturned Baker and requires states to issue marriage licenses to same-sex couples and to recognize same-sex marriages validly performed in other jurisdictions. This established same-sex marriage throughout the United States and its territories. In a majority opinion authored by Justice Anthony Kennedy, the Court examined the nature of fundamental rights guaranteed to all by the Constitution, the harm done to individuals by delaying the implementation of such rights while the democratic process plays out, and the evolving understanding of discrimination and inequality that has developed greatly since Baker.

== V.L. v. E.L. (2016) ==
V.L. v. E.L., 577 U.S. 404 (2016), is a case decided by the Supreme Court of the United States concerning the adoption rights of same-sex couples. In 2007, a Georgia Superior Court granted adoption rights to V.L., the partner of E.L., the woman who gave birth to their three children. However, after moving back to Alabama, the couple split up. E.L. tried to block V.L. from seeing the children, but V.L. filed a lawsuit seeking visitation and other parental rights. On September 18, 2015, the Supreme Court of Alabama ruled that the state did not have to recognize the adoption judgment, saying that the Georgia court misapplied its own state law. The court voided the recognition of the adoption judgment in Alabama. V.L. petitioned the United States Supreme Court to stay the ruling during her appeal and allow her to see her children. On December 14, 2015, the Supreme Court stayed the ruling pending their action on a petition for a writ of certiorari filed by V.L. On March 7, 2016, the Supreme Court of the United States reversed the decision of the Alabama Supreme Court by per curiam summary disposition.

== Pavan v. Smith (2017) ==
- Full caption: Marisa N. Pavan, et al. v. Nathaniel Smith
- Citations: 582 U.S. 563; 137 S. Ct. 2075; 198 L. Ed. 2d 636
- Prior history: Judgment for plaintiffs, No. 60CV-15-3153, Ark. Cir. Ct., Pulaski Cty; rev'd, 505 S.W. 3d 169 (Ark. 2016)
- Laws applied: U.S. Const. amend. XIV; Ark. Code § 20–18–401 (2014)
- Full text of the opinion: official slip opinion · Oyez

582 U.S. 563; 137 S. Ct. 2075; 198 L. Ed. 2d 636
Decided June 26, 2017.
This case concerns two lesbian couples, Leigh and Jana Jacobs and Terrah and Marisa Pavan. The Jacobses were married in Iowa in 2010, and the Pavans were married in New Hampshire in 2011. Both couples conceived children through anonymous sperm donors, and those children were both born in Arkansas in 2015. When they filled out the birth certificates, both couples listed both partners' names, but the State of Arkansas accepted only the birth mothers' names. Arkansas state law required that the birth mother's name be listed on the form, and that the husband of the birth mother be listed on the form as the father, including in cases of artificial insemination by anonymous sperm donor. Both couples sued the State of Arkansas, alleging that the birth certificate law violated the Constitution. The trial court agreed, but the Arkansas Supreme Court reversed, reasoning that the statute was about the biological relationship between a mother and a child, and thus did not violate the precedent set in Obergefell v. Hodges. The United States Supreme Court summarily reversed that decision and remanded it, stating that the reasoning of the Arkansas Supreme Court denies married gay couples the benefits that are inherent in marriage, thus violating Obergefell.

Justice Neil Gorsuch filed a dissenting opinion, which was joined by Justices Thomas and Alito. In it, he argued that this case warranted more than summary reversal, because Obergefell was solely about marriage and this statute, while tangentially related, was a different issue.

== Masterpiece Cakeshop v. Colorado Civil Rights Commission (2018) ==
Masterpiece Cakeshop v. Colorado Civil Rights Commission, 584 U.S. 617 (2018), was a case in the Supreme Court of the United States that addressed whether owners of public accommodations can refuse certain services based on the First Amendment claims of free speech and free exercise of religion, and therefore be granted an exemption from laws ensuring non-discrimination in public accommodations—in particular, by refusing to provide creative services, such as making a custom wedding cake for the marriage of a gay couple, on the basis of the owner's religious beliefs.

The case dealt with Masterpiece Cakeshop, a bakery in Lakewood, Colorado, which refused to design a custom wedding cake for a gay couple based on the owner's religious beliefs. The Colorado Civil Rights Commission evaluated the case under the state's anti-discrimination law, the Colorado Anti-Discrimination Act. The commission found that the bakery had discriminated against the couple and issued specific orders for the bakery. Following appeals within the state, the Commission's decision against the bakery was affirmed, so the bakery took the case to the U.S. Supreme Court.

In a 7–2 decision, the majority ruled that the Commission did not employ religious neutrality, citing the Commission's hostility towards Masterpiece owner Jack Phillips's religious objections. The Supreme Court found the Commission violated his rights to free exercise, and reversed the Commission's decision. The Court did not rule on the broader intersection of anti-discrimination laws, free exercise of religion, and freedom of speech, due to the complications of the Commission's lack of religious neutrality, which was later evaluated in 303 Creative LLC v. Elenis (2023).

== Bostock v. Clayton County (2020) ==
Bostock v. Clayton County, 590 U.S. 644 (2020), is a landmark United States Supreme Court civil rights decision in which the Court held that Title VII of the Civil Rights Act of 1964 protects employees against discrimination on the basis of sexual orientation or gender identity.

The plaintiff, Gerald Bostock, was fired from his county job after he expressed interest in a gay softball league at work. The lower courts followed the Eleventh Circuit's past precedent that Title VII did not cover employment discrimination based on sexual orientation. The case was consolidated with Altitude Express, Inc. v. Zarda, a similar case of apparent discrimination due to sexual orientation from the Second Circuit, but which had added to a circuit split. Oral arguments were heard on October 8, 2019, alongside R.G. & G.R. Harris Funeral Homes Inc. v. Equal Employment Opportunity Commission, a similar question of Title VII discrimination relating to transgender persons.

On June 15, 2020, the Court ruled in a 6–3 decision covering all three cases that discrimination on the basis of sexual orientation or gender identity is necessarily also discrimination "because of sex" as prohibited by Title VII. According to Justice Neil Gorsuch's majority opinion, that is so because employers discriminating against gay or transgender employees accept a certain characteristic (e.g., attraction to women) in employees of one sex but not in employees of the other sex.

The ruling has been hailed as one of the most important legal decisions regarding LGBTQ rights in the United States, along with Lawrence v. Texas (2003) and Obergefell v. Hodges (2015). Many legal analysts claimed that the case defined Gorsuch as a textualist in statutory interpretation.

== Altitude Express, Inc. v. Zarda (2020) ==
Altitude Express, Inc. v. Zarda, 590 U.S. ___ (2020), is a landmark United States Supreme Court civil rights case which ruled that under Title VII of the Civil Rights Act of 1964 employees could not be discriminated against on the basis of sexual orientation or gender identity.

The case involved Donald Zarda, a skydiving instructor for Altitude Express who had told a female customer of his gay identity to make her more comfortable being attached to him during a skydive. She and her boyfriend later expressed their objections to Altitude, leading to Zarda's dismissal on the claim of misconduct. Zarda filed suit in 2014 on the basis of employment discrimination, and though Zarda died in a parachuting accident that year, his family continued the legal battle.

The District Court ruled in favor of Altitude Express in Zarda v. Altitude Express, and this ruling was affirmed by a 3-0 ruling of the United States Court of Appeals for the Second Circuit. However, the Second Circuit agreed to rehear the case en banc, and then ruled in a 10-3 decision that Title VII does protect employees from discrimination based on sexual orientation, adding to a circuit split. The Supreme Court accepted Altitude Express's petition and consolidated the case alongside Bostock v. Clayton County, a similar case of sexual orientation discrimination from the Eleventh Circuit but which ruled that Title VII did not cover such discrimination. Oral arguments were heard on October 8, 2019, alongside the case R.G. & G.R. Harris Funeral Homes Inc. v. Equal Employment Opportunity Commission which dealt with Title VII and employment protections for transgender people. The Court ruled in a 6–3 decision for Bostock, covering all three cases, on June 15, 2020, that Title VII protections do apply to gay and transgender persons.

== R.G. & G.R. Harris Funeral Homes Inc. v. Equal Employment Opportunity Commission (2020) ==
R.G. & G.R. Harris Funeral Homes Inc. v. Equal Employment Opportunity Commission, 590 U.S. ___ (2020), is a landmark United States Supreme Court case which ruled that Title VII of the Civil Rights Act of 1964 protects transgender people from employment discrimination.

Aimee Stephens was a funeral home employee who had presented herself as male up until 2013. On July 31, 2013, she wrote to her employer, the Harris Funeral Homes group, so that they could be prepared for her decision to undergo gender reassignment surgery, telling them that after a vacation, she planned to return dressed in female attire that otherwise followed the employee handbook. She was fired shortly after the letter was sent, and the Equal Employment Opportunity Commission helped to represent Stephens in court. The District Court ruled for the funeral homes, stating Title VII did not cover transgender people and that as a religious organization under the Religious Freedom Restoration Act, the company had a right to dismiss Stephens for non-conformity. The Sixth Circuit Court of Appeals reversed the decision, concluding Title VII did include protection for transgender people, which Harris Funeral Homes petitioned the Supreme Court to review. About a month before the Supreme Court decision, Stephens died from health complications. Representation of her case continued through her estate.

The case was heard on October 8, 2019, alongside two other cases, Bostock v. Clayton County and Altitude Express, Inc. v. Zarda which dealt with Title VII protection related to sexual orientation. The Court ruled in a 6–3 decision under Bostock but covering all three cases on June 15, 2020, that Title VII protection extends to gay and transgender people.

== Fulton v. City of Philadelphia (2021) ==
Fulton v. City of Philadelphia, 593 U.S. 522 (2021), was a United States Supreme Court case which held that the City of Philadelphia, Pennsylvania violated First Amendment rights of a Catholic foster care agency by refusing to renew the agency's contract unless it agreed to certify married same-sex couples as foster parents.

In a unanimous judgment on June 17, 2021, the Court ruled that the City's refusal due to the agency's same-sex couple policy violated the Free Exercise Clause. The Court decided the case on narrow grounds outside of the Supreme Court's prior decision in Employment Division v. Smith, which had previously ruled that neutral laws of general applicability could not be challenged for violating religious exemptions. Instead, in Fulton, the Court ruled that services like foster care contracting were not generally applicable under Smith, and thus were subject to strict scrutiny review. Because the City allowed for exceptions to be made in its anti-discrimination policy for foster care certification, the Court deemed the City's refusal to grant an exemption for Catholic Social Services as violating its free exercise of religion under Smith.

== 303 Creative LLC v. Elenis (2023) ==
303 Creative LLC v. Elenis, 600 U.S. 570 (2023), is a United States Supreme Court decision that dealt with the intersection of anti-discrimination law in public accommodations and the Free Speech Clause of the First Amendment to the United States Constitution. In a 6–3 decision, the Court ruled in favor of a website designer, ruling that the state of Colorado cannot compel the designer to create work that violates her values. The case follows from Masterpiece Cakeshop v. Colorado Civil Rights Commission, 584 U.S. 617 (2018), which had dealt with similar conflict between free speech rights and Colorado's anti-discrimination laws but had been decided on narrower grounds.

Both Masterpiece Cakeshop and 303 Creative involved questions of whether a U.S. state's anti-discrimination laws can require designers to create works that recognize same-sex marriages, when same-sex marriage conflicts with those designers' beliefs. The decision in 303 Creative was seen by some as a victory for free speech rights as well as religious liberty and by others as a setback for LGBTQ rights and an assertion of discrimination as a type of free speech.

== United States v. Skrmetti (2025) ==
United States v. Skrmetti, 605 U.S. 495 (2025), is a United States Supreme Court case which held that a Tennessee state law banning puberty blockers and hormone therapy for the treatment of gender dysphoria in minors did not violate the Equal Protection Clause of the Fourteenth Amendment to the United States Constitution.

Under Tennessee’s law, a child could receive puberty blockers and hormone therapy if the medications were provided to help them conform to their sex assigned at birth, but not to treat gender dysphoria. The plaintiffs argued this constituted sex-based discrimination and thus violated the Equal Protection Clause. Tennessee argued the law did not treat people differently based on their sex, but rather based on their age and medical condition.

The district court applied heightened scrutiny and blocked the law from taking effect. The Court of Appeals for the Sixth Circuit overturned, ruling the ban did not discriminate based on sex and thus only required rational basis review.

The Supreme Court upheld the appellate court's decision on a 6–3 split, with the six conservative justices agreeing the ban was based on age and medical reason for treatment rather than on sex. Writing for the majority, Chief Justice John Roberts emphasized that the ruling was not based on an ideological opposition to transgender rights; writing for the minority, Associate Justice Sonia Sotomayor criticized the Court's decision as a failure to uphold the civil rights of transgender youth.

== Mahmoud v. Taylor (2025) ==
Mahmoud v. Taylor, 606 U.S. 522 (2025), is a landmark United States Supreme Court decision about parents who wished to opt their children out of instruction involving LGBTQ-themed storybooks in a Maryland public school system. The Court held that the school district's policy of not permitting opt-outs violated the parents' right to free exercise of religion under the First Amendment.

== Chiles v. Salazar (2026) ==
Chiles v. Salazar, 607 U.S. ___ (2026), is a United States Supreme Court case which ruled that the First Amendment to the United States Constitution requires strict scrutiny be applied to laws passed by states that restrict what topics therapists may discuss with clients, specifically referring to Colorado's Minor Conversion Therapy Law (MCTL) that banned conversion therapy on minors by licensed mental health professionals.

The ban was challenged by a licensed therapist as a violation of the First Amendment, as the therapist only talked with their patients. The state defended the ban by claiming that it was constrained to licensed professionals and only as with respect to their professional duties. The ban was upheld in lower courts, but the Supreme Court ruling, decided 8–1 in March 2026, reversed the lower courts rulings and remanded the case to be reviewed as-applied under strict scrutiny; as such, speech-only therapy is considered to be protected speech under the First Amendment.

== West Virginia v. B. P. J. (2026) ==
West Virginia v. B. P. J. (consolidated with Little v. Hecox), 609 U.S. ___ (2026), is a United States Supreme Court case holding that schools can provide separate girls' and boys' sports teams defined by biological sex. The case upheld state laws that banned or restricted transgender women athletes from participating in women's school sports teams.

In April 2024, the Fourth Circuit held that a West Virginia law barring transgender girls and women from participating on girls' and women's sports teams was unconstitutional. The case was argued on January 13, 2026, alongside Little v. Hecox, which challenges an Idaho law restricting girls' and women's teams to students who are biologically female. The arguments took place amid widespread adoption of similar state laws and related national policy disputes.

On June 30, 2026, the Court ruled unanimously that allowing different sports teams for boys and girls does not violate Title IX and 6–3 that Idaho and West Virginia's laws did not violate the Equal Protection Clause of the Constitution by using biological sex as a requirement for female sports teams. Sotomayor, Kagan, and Jackson were concurring in the judgment in part and dissenting in part.

== Little v. Hecox (2026) ==
Little v. Hecox (consolidated with West Virginia v. B. P. J.) is a United States Supreme Court case holding that schools can determine eligibility for women's and girls' sports teams based on biological sex. The case upheld state laws banning or restricting transgender athletes from participating on female athletic teams.

Little v Hecox challenged Idaho's 2020 "Fairness in Women's Sports Act", which explicitly defined sex based on genitalia and chromosomes rather than gender. It was argued alongside West Virginia v. B. P. J. which challenged a similar law in West Virginia.

The Court heard oral arguments on January 13, 2026. The case was significant as it tested the application of the Court's 2020 ruling in Bostock v. Clayton County—which held that Title VII's prohibition on sex discrimination includes gender identity—to the context of competitive sports and Title IX.

On June 30, 2026, the Court decided 6–3 that Idaho and West Virginia's laws did not violate the Equal Protection Clause of the 14th Amendment and in doing so, found laws banning trans girls and women from female sports to be constitutional.

== See also ==
- LGBT rights in the United States § History of U.S. Supreme Court decisions on LGBT rights
- Goodridge v. Department of Public Health (2003), the court case that legalized same-sex marriage in Massachusetts (first state to do so in the U.S.)
