= Doe v. Commonwealth's Attorney of Richmond =

- Supreme Court of the United States

Decided March 29, 1976
- Full case name: Doe v. Commonwealth's Attorney of Richmond
- Citations: 425 U.S. 901 (more) 96 S. Ct. 1489; 47 L. Ed. 2d 751

Case history
- Prior: 403 F. Supp. 1199 (E.D. Va. 1975)

Holding
- A state has the burden of proof to show a legitimate, rational interest in a statute. Virginia did so.

Court membership
- Chief Justice Warren E. Burger Associate Justices William J. Brennan Jr. · Potter Stewart; Byron White · Thurgood Marshall; Harry Blackmun · Lewis F. Powell Jr. William Rehnquist · John P. Stevens

Doe v. Commonwealth's Attorney of Richmond, 425 U.S. 901 (1976), is a decision by the Supreme Court of the United States which gave summary affirmation of a lower court ruling which upheld the U.S. state of Virginia's ban on homosexual sodomy.

== About the case ==
=== Background ===
The first permanent English colony was established in 1607 in Jamestown, Virginia. Three years later in 1610, Virginia adopted England's sodomy laws, making sodomy punishable by death. The first person punished under a sodomy law in the English colonies was a woman, Elizabeth Johnson, in 1642 in the Massachusetts Bay Colony. Gay men were not singled out by sodomy laws until the late 1800s, when gay subcultures developed in the growing cities. Police frequently raided restaurants and bars with gay and lesbian clientele throughout the 20th century. By the 1950s, all 50 states had sodomy laws, and sodomy was considered a felony in all but two states. In the spring of 1969, several Richmond, Virginia, bars were forced to close for violating Virginia alcoholic beverage control laws which prohibited the sale of alcohol to known homosexuals. Many people wrote letters to the Richmond Times-Dispatch protesting the closing of these bars. In 1961, Illinois became the first U.S. state to repeal their law against consensual sodomy. At the time of the Doe case, 34 states had laws making homosexual acts between consenting adults punishable criminal offenses.

Following the U.S. Supreme Court's Roe v. Wade decision, members of the National Gay and Lesbian Task Force (NGLTF) worked with an attorney from the Loving v. Virginia (1967) case, Philip Hirschkop, to challenge Virginia's sodomy laws. Hirschkop believed that the right to privacy established in previous cases, especially Roe, protected consenting adults' sexual behavior.

In 1975, with the assistance of NGLTF, two anonymous homosexual men filed suit in federal district court challenging the constitutionality of the criminalization of homosexual anal or oral sex. The Code of Virginia provided: "§ 18.1-212. Crimes against nature. If any person shall carnally know in any manner any brute animal, or carnally know any male or female person by the anus or by or with the mouth, or voluntarily submit to such carnal knowledge, he or she shall be guilty of a felony and shall be confined in the penitentiary not less than one year nor more than three years." The plaintiffs claimed this statute violated their First Amendment right to freedom of expression, their Fifth and Fourteenth Amendments right to due process, and the Eighth Amendment's prohibition of cruel and unusual punishment.

=== Court decisions ===
A three-judge panel of the United States District Court for the Eastern District of Virginia upheld the constitutionality of anti-sodomy laws. The majority opinion, written by Senior Circuit Judge Albert V. Bryan, concluded: "If a State determines that punishment therefor, even when committed in the home, is appropriate in the promotion of morality and decency, it is not for the courts to say that the State is not free to do so." Judge Robert R. Merhige Jr. disagreed with the ruling. In his dissenting opinion he wrote: "The Supreme Court has consistently held that the Due Process Clause of the Fourteenth Amendment protects the right of individuals to make personal choices.. A mature individual's choice of an adult sexual partner, in the privacy of his or her own home, would appear to me to be a decision of the utmost private and intimate concern.""

The two plaintiffs appealed to the U.S. Supreme Court, which provided a one-sentence summary affirmation of the district court's decision.

== Importance of the case ==
Doe v. Commonwealth's Attorney of Richmond was the second U.S. Supreme Court decision dealing with homosexual sodomy (the first was Wainwright v. Stone). Following the Civil Rights Movement and second-wave feminism, many believed privacy and equality should include sexual orientation. The Fourteenth Amendment's Equal Protection Clause and Due Process Clause were used to defend the constitutionality of birth control, abortion, and pornography.

The plaintiffs in Doe argued that personal privacy took precedence over a state's right to regulate morality. Following the ruling, one of the plaintiffs and NGLTF co-director Jean O'Leary wrote an article in The New York Times criticizing the decision. O'Leary argued the Doe decision affected more heterosexuals than homosexuals because Kinsey Institute researchers found about 60 percent of heterosexuals engage in illegal sexual acts. Many sexual acts deemed illegal by the state were recommended by marriage therapists and in sexual counseling books. Other people worried homosexuality could lead to child predators or threaten the institutions of marriage and family, although there was little evidence to support these claims.

== Subsequent legal developments ==
In Bowers v. Hardwick, 478 U.S. 186 (1986), the U.S. Supreme Court ruled 5-4 that a Georgia state anti-sodomy law was constitutional. With an invalid warrant, Atlanta police officers entered Hardwick's home for failing to appear in court to answer a public drinking charge. Hardwick and another man were caught in the act of sodomy and both men were arrested. Neither were prosecuted, but Hardwick decided to file suit in federal district court claiming his constitutional right to privacy was violated. The case reached the U.S. Supreme Court, where a majority ruled that sodomy laws had "ancient roots... homosexual conduct has been subject to state intervention throughout the history of Western civilization".

In Lawrence v. Texas, 539 U.S. 558 (2003), the Supreme Court ruled 6-3 that sodomy laws were unconstitutional, overturning Doe v. Commonwealth's Attorney and Bowers v. Hardwick. The court stated that "Far from possessing 'ancient roots,' American laws targeting same-sex couples did not develop until the last third of the 20th century... The Bowers Court was, of course, making the broader point that for centuries there have been powerful voices to condemn homosexual conduct as immoral, but this Court's obligation is to define the liberty of all, not to mandate its own moral code".

In 2015, the U.S. Supreme Court ruled in a 5–4 decision that the Fourteenth Amendment also guaranteed same-sex couples' right to marry in Obergefell v. Hodges.

== See also ==
- List of LGBT-related cases in the United States Supreme Court

== Bibliography ==
- "Doe v. Commonwealth's Attorney" (PDF). Princeton University.
- Green, Leonard (October 1991). "Anti-Gay Laws Challenged". Our Own Community Press.
- O'Leary, Jean (May 15, 1976). "Implications of the Supreme Court Decision on Sodomy". The New York Times.
- O'Neill, Tim (1977). "Doe v. Commonwealth's Attorney: A Set-Back for the Right of Privacy". Kentucky Law Journal. 65 (3): 750–759.
- Pierceson, Jason (August 2008). Queer Politics Queer Theories: Courts Liberalism And Rights: Gay Law and Politics In The United States and Canada. Temple University Press.
- "Timeline of LGBT History in Virginia and the United States" (PDF). Virginia Department of Historic Resources.
- Urofsky, Melvin (2013). "Bowers v. Hardwick". Britannica Academic.
- Ziegler, Mary (Spring 2016). "Perceiving Orientation: Defining Sexuality After Obergefell". Duke Journal of Gender Law and Policy. 23 (2): 223–61.
