= V.L. v. E.L. =

- Supreme Court of the United States

Decided March 7, 2016
- Full case name: V.L. v. E.L., et al.
- Docket no.: 15-648
- Citations: 577 U.S. 404 (more) 136 S. Ct. 1017; 194 L. Ed. 2d 92; 2016 U.S. LEXIS 1653

Case history
- Prior: Judgment for petitioner, No. CS-13-719 (April 15, 2014 Ala. Dist. Ct., Jefferson Cty.); rev'd, No. 2130683 (Ala. Ct. Civ. App. Oct. 24, 2014); on rehearing, aff'd in part, sub nom. Ex parte E.L., No. 2130683, 2015 WL 836916 (Ala. Ct. Civ. App. Feb. 27, 2015); rev., No. 1140595, 2015 WL 5511249 (Ala. September 18, 2015)
- Procedural: Visitation order issued in Jefferson County Family Court (Apr 2014); reversed by Alabama Court of Civil Appeals (Oct 2014); rehearing granted, Family Court ruling affirmed by Alabama Court of Civil Appeals (Feb 2015); reversed and remanded by Supreme Court of Alabama (Sep 2015). Motion by petitioner to stay the ruling granted by U.S. Supreme Court (Dec 2015). Order reversed by the United States Supreme Court, adoption rights restored to V.L. (March 2016).

Holding
- Under the Full Faith and Credit Clause, the State of Alabama must recognize the adoption decree granted by a Georgia state court in 2007, regardless of how that court came to its conclusion granting the decree. Supreme Court of Alabama reversed and remanded.

Court membership
- Chief Justice John Roberts Associate Justices Anthony Kennedy · Clarence Thomas; Ruth Bader Ginsburg · Stephen Breyer; Samuel Alito · Sonia Sotomayor; Elena Kagan

Case opinion
- Per curiam

Laws applied
- U.S. Const., Art. IV, §1; Ga. Code Ann. §19–8–5(a)

V.L. v. E.L., 577 U.S. 404 (2016), is a case decided by the Supreme Court of the United States concerning the adoption rights of same-sex couples. In 2007, a Georgia Superior Court granted adoption rights to V.L., the partner of E.L., the woman who gave birth to their three children. However, after moving back to Alabama, the couple split up. E.L. tried to block V.L. from seeing the children, but V.L. filed a lawsuit seeking visitation and other parental rights. On September 18, 2015, the Supreme Court of Alabama ruled that the state did not have to recognize the adoption judgment, saying that the Georgia court misapplied its own state law. The court voided the recognition of the adoption judgment in Alabama. V.L. petitioned the United States Supreme Court to stay the ruling during her appeal and allow her to see her children. On December 14, 2015, the Supreme Court stayed the ruling pending their action on a petition for a writ of certiorari filed by V.L. On March 7, 2016, the Supreme Court of the United States reversed the decision of the Alabama Supreme Court by per curiam summary disposition.

== Background ==
The plaintiff, identified only by initials V.L., and the defendant identified by E.L., entered into a committed relationship in 1995. In 2002, E.L. gave birth to a child via artificial insemination. In 2004, E.L. gave birth to twins via the same method. V.L. acted as a second parent to all three children and the family lived as such. In 2007, the couple and their three children went to Georgia and asked the Superior Court of Fulton County, Georgia to issue an adoption decree recognizing V.L. as a legal parent of the children. The court approved the adoption and the family moved back to Alabama.

In 2011, the couple split apart. V.L. was allowed to see her children for a short time afterwards with the consent of E.L. However, visitation eventually became an issue and on October 31, 2013, V.L. filed a complaint in the Jefferson County Family Court to recognize the Georgia adoption decree. On April 3, 2014, the judge awarded V.L. visitation, recognizing the Georgia adoption decree.

== Appeals ==
E.L. appealed the visitation order to the Alabama Court of Civil Appeals. In October 2014, the Court initially ruled that the Jefferson County judge was incorrect in granting adoption rights. Upon a request for rehearing, however, on February 27, 2015, the Court of Appeals upheld the original ruling recognizing the adoption decree, but ruled the trial court erred in not holding a hearing to address the issue. E.L. filed an appeal with the Supreme Court of Alabama. On April 15, 2015, the Supreme Court of Alabama granted the writ of certiorari.

On September 18, 2015, the Supreme Court of Alabama in a per curiam opinion declared the adoption decree void in the State of Alabama. The Court ruled that the court that had granted the adoption decree misapplied Georgia state law, and did not have subject-matter jurisdiction to grant the adoption. Five justices formed the majority opinion. Justice Murdock concurred without opinion. In a separate concurrence, Justice Parker stated "the State has a legitimate interest in encouraging that children be adopted into the optimal family structure, i.e., one with both a father and a mother." Only Justice Shaw dissented, stating that the United States Constitution's Full Faith and Credit Clause prohibited the Alabama Supreme Court from ruling on the merits of the case. The justice stated that Alabama case law did not allow the court to inquire into how another state court reached a judgment, only that Alabama must respect it.

== United States Supreme Court ==
V.L. filed a petition for a writ of certiorari with the U.S. Supreme Court on November 16, 2015 and requested that the court stay the ruling by the Supreme Court of Alabama nullifying her parental rights. The children's state-appointed guardian ad litem also filed a petition for a writ of certiorari, as he felt that it was not in the children's best interest to have V.L. removed from their lives. V.L.'s argument was that the Full Faith and Credit Clause requires each state to recognize court judgments from other states, including adoption decrees. She also noted that no other state had before refused to recognize an adoption decree from another state.

On December 14, 2015, the U.S. Supreme Court stayed the ruling, pending their disposition of the case. The stay allowed V.L. to continue to visit her children while the court considered her petition to review the case.

On March 7, 2016, the Supreme Court issued a per curiam summary disposition which reversed the Supreme Court of Alabama, and effectively reinstated V.L.'s rights granted by the Georgia Superior Court. The court's reasoning was based on the Full Faith and Credit Clause of the U.S. Constitution. The Supreme Court also ruled that the Superior Court in Georgia did have subject matter jurisdiction to rule on the adoption and that E.L. had expressly consented to the adoption. Furthermore, the court ruled that since no Georgia law was contrary to the Georgia adoption judgment, the Supreme Court of Alabama was incorrect in refusing to recognize the judgment. The court reversed the Supreme Court of Alabama, and remanded the case for further proceedings.

== See also ==
- List of LGBTQ-related cases in the United States Supreme Court
