= Albemarle Paper Co. v. Moody =

- Supreme Court of the United States

Argued Apr 14, 1975 Decided June 25, 1975
- Full case name: Albemarle Paper Co. et al. v. Moody et al.
- Docket no.: 74-389
- Citations: 422 U.S. 405 (more) 95 S. Ct.2362, L. Ed. 2d 280
- Argument: Oral argument
- Opinion announcement: Opinion announcement

Case history
- Prior: Moody v. Albemarle Paper Co., 474 F.2d 134 (4th Cir. 1973)

Holding
- Title VII plaintiffs do not need to prove bad faith to be entitled to backpay

Court membership
- Chief Justice Warren E. Burger Associate Justices William O. Douglas · William J. Brennan Jr. Potter Stewart · Byron White; Thurgood Marshall · Harry Blackmun; Lewis F. Powell Jr. · William Rehnquist

Case opinions
- Majority: Stewart, joined by Douglas, Brennan, Marshall, White
- Concurrence: Marshall
- Concurrence: Blackmun
- Concur/dissent: Burger

Laws applied
- Title VII of the Civil Rights Act of 1964

Albemarle Paper Co. v. Moody, 422 US 405 (1975), is a United States Supreme Court case in which the court held that Title VII disparate impact plaintiffs do not need to prove bad faith to be entitled to backpay. It also expanded on the holding from Griggs v. Duke Power that employment tests must be sufficiently job-related.

== Background ==
Before the enactment of Title VII, Albemarle Paper Company "strictly segregated" its production lines, giving the higher-paying and more skilled jobs strictly to white employees. This system persisted until 1968 when Albemarle and the employees' labor union enacted a new collective bargaining agreement.

The new agreement changed the existing seniority system. The agreement opened lines of progression to black employees that were previously open only to white employees. However, the system left the plant's black employees behind its white ones on every line of progression. "The formerly 'Negro' lines of progression had been merely tacked on to the bottom of the formerly 'white' lines." In the 1950s, Albemarle began giving general ability tests to job applicants to sort them into the higher or lower-paying lines. Albemarle gave two tests, the Beta Examination and the Wonderlic test, which was at issue in Griggs v. Duke Power.

A class of former and then-present black employees sued Albemarle, as well as the union for violating Title VII. Initially, the plaintiffs sought only injunctive relief against policies, customs, or practices that violate Title VII under its disparate impact provision. In 1970, after a few years of discovery, the plaintiffs added a demand for backpay.

The district court ordered Albemarle to redo its seniority system but denied the plaintiff's claim for backpay because the plaintiffs had not shown bad faith on the part of Albemarle. The district court also refused to order changes or eliminate Albemarle's testing procedures. The Fourth Circuit Court of Appeals reversed the district court and ruled that backpay should have been awarded, rejecting the "bad faith" standard relied upon by the district court. The Fourth Circuit also ordered Albemarle to enjoin its use of the pre-employment tests.

The Supreme Court accepted cert to resolve the circuit split over the proper standard for awarding backpay, as well as what is required to show that pre-employment tests are sufficiently job-related.

== Supreme Court ==
Justice Potter Stewart delivered a 7–1 opinion for the court vacating the Fourth Circuit's decision and remanding for further proceedings. The court clarified the standard of culpability plaintiffs must prove to be eligible to receive backpay.

The court rejected the idea that plaintiffs had to show their employers' violations of Title VII were in bad faith. Justice Stewart explained that allowing backpay only where the employer acted in bad faith is inconsistent with the purpose of Title VII. Title VII specifically provides for "make whole" relief, where the "injured party is to be placed, as near as may be, in the situation he would have occupied if the wrong had not been committed." Backpay is an important part of that relief and does not depend on employers' bad faith violations of the law. Justice Stewart also emphasized that the "make whole" purpose of Title VII, which includes backpay even against good faith violators of the law, is strongly supported by the legislative record around Title VII's enactment.

However, Justice Stewart held that the plaintiffs may not be entitled to backpay if their demands for it are "tardy [and] inconsistent". Backpay is a form of equitable relief and awarding backpay is discretionary and requires a fact-based inquiry. Delayed and inconsistent demands for backpay may result in prejudice against the defendant, rendering backpay inappropriate. The Supreme Court remanded to lower courts to decide if the plaintiffs were entitled to backpay in light of the court's opinion.

The Court also reaffirmed the holding of Griggs v. Duke Power that "employment tests that are discriminatory in effect unless the employer meets "the burden of showing that any given requirement [has]… a manifest relationship to the employment in question. In the 1950s and '60s, Albemarle began using pre-employment tests, one of which was the Wonderlic and required a certain score for employees to be eligible for higher-paying jobs. Justice Stewart also approved of and cited EEOC's guidance on validating pre-employment tests. Albemarle's attempts to validate the tests as appropriately job-related fell flat.

To be sufficiently job-related, the tests must accurately measure the ability of applicants to perform the job in question. Albemarle's attempt at validation failed on multiple fronts. The Beta Examination only correlated to job performance on three of Albemarle's eight lines. Albemarle administered two versions of the Wonderlic that while "theoretically identical and interchangeable measures of verbal facility, significant correlations for one form but not for the other were obtained in four job groupings." Neither form showed a correlation to two of the eight lines. Additionally, the standards by which supervisors evaluated employees were "extremely vague and fatally open to divergent interpretations."

The court concluded that there was no way to know what criteria the supervisors were considering, or even whether different supervisors used the same criteria. There was therefore no way to know whether the criteria considered were sufficiently related to justify the employment practices with discriminatory impact.

The court vacated the Fourth Circuit's judgment and remanded to the district court for further proceedings.

=== Marshalls's concurrence ===
Justice Thurgood Marshall wrote a concurring opinion to emphasize certain portions of the opinion regarding backpay. Title VII contains no bar to raising claims of backpay at any point in the litigation, even after trial had already begun. Justice Marshall emphasized that backpay should be granted to successful Title VII plaintiffs except in the most extreme circumstances. He left open the idea that Albemarle had been prejudiced by the plaintiff's lateness in adding the claim for backpay, but doubted Albemarle would be able to prove prejudice.

=== Rehnquists's concurrence ===
Justice Rehnquist wrote a concurring opinion to clarify the difference between backpay and damages. Where damages are automatically granted to victorious plaintiffs, backpay is equitable relief that is governed by equitable considerations. Justice Rehnquist noted that Title VII already contains a limited good faith defense for employers who relied on EEOC guidance when making employment decisions. Expanding the defense to backpay would therefore be atextual.

=== Blackmun's concurrence ===
Justice Blackmun wrote an opinion concurring in the judgment of the court, but disagreeing with some of the opinion. Justice Blackmun argued that good faith was an important factor to consider when deciding backpay and also argued that the EEOC's guidelines, upon which the majority opinion relied, were not subject to formal rulemaking under the Administrative Procedures Act. He also argued that the theories underlying the EEOC's guidance were untested and overly rigid.

=== Burger's dissent ===
Justice Burger wrote an opinion concurring in part or dissenting in part. He argued that under the majority's standard, backpay was inappropriate because Albemarle had already changed its policies. He argued that imposing backpay liability on employers whose illegal activity was in good faith provides them with little incentive to comply, absent a court order. Justice Burger also argued that the majority improperly relied on EEOC guidance because that guidance is not formal regulations and are therefore not entitled to the level of deference granted them by the majority.
