= Aimee Stephens =

American civil rights activist (1960–2020)

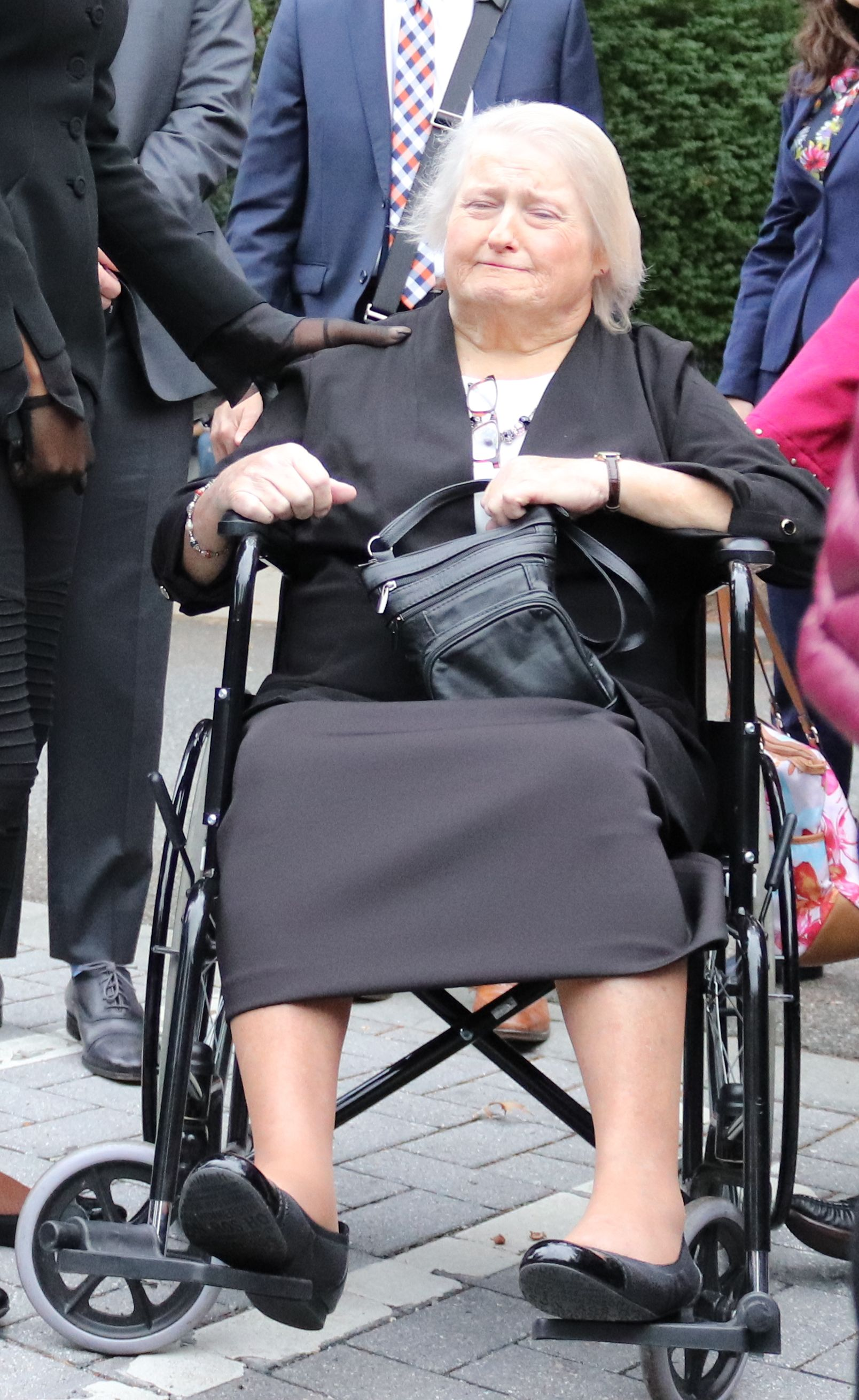
- Born: December 7, 1960; Fayetteville, North Carolina, United States
- Died: May 12, 2020 (aged 59); Redford, Michigan, United States
- Education: Mars Hill University, Fayetteville Technical Community College

Aimee Stephens (December 7, 1960 – May 12, 2020) was an American funeral director known for her fight for civil rights for transgender people. She worked as a funeral director in Detroit and was fired for being transgender. Based on her court case, in a historic 2020 decision, the U.S. Supreme Court ruled that the 1964 Civil Rights Act protects gay, lesbian, and transgender employees from discrimination based on sex.

== Early life and education ==
Aimee Stephens was born on December 7, 1960, in Fayetteville, N.C. She graduated from Mars Hill University in 1984 with a degree in religious education and obtained a degree in mortuary science from Fayetteville Technical Community College in 1988.

== R.G. & G.R. Harris Funeral Homes Inc. v. Equal Employment Opportunity Commission ==
Stephens was fired from her job at R.G. & G.R. Harris Funeral Home in Garden City in 2013 after she said she would wear appropriate women's business attire at work. Stephens started a legal case, arguing that she was protected under Title VII of the federal Civil Rights Act of 1964. The funeral home owner argued that since he would have required everyone to dress according to the gender they had been biologically assigned at birth, he had not discriminated against her. The Supreme Court agreed with Stephens, with Justice Neil Gorsuch acknowledging that "Congress in 1964 likely did not have the LGBTQ community in mind when it banned discrimination based on sex. But he said the words of the statute are clear."

== Personal life ==
She was married to Donna Stephens for 20 years, and they had one child together.

== Death and legacy ==
Stephens died from complications related to kidney failure on May 12, 2020.

In June 2020, Stephens was added among American “pioneers, trailblazers, and heroes” on the National LGBTQ Wall of Honor within the Stonewall National Monument (SNM) in New York City’s Stonewall Inn. The SNM is the first U.S. national monument dedicated to LGBTQ rights and history.
