= City of Los Angeles Department of Water & Power v. Manhart =

- Supreme Court of the United States

Argued January 18, 1978 Decided April 25, 1978
- Full case name: City of Los Angeles Department of Water and Power, et al. v. Manhart, et al.
- Docket no.: 76-1810
- Citations: 435 U.S. 702 (more)
- Argument: Oral argument
- Opinion announcement: Opinion announcement

Case history
- Prior: Manhart v. City of Los Angeles, Dept. of Water and Power, 387 F. Supp. 980 (C.D. Cal. 1975) (granting preliminary injunction); Affirmed by Manhart v. City of Los Angeles, Dept. of Water, 553 F.2d 581 (9th Cir. 1976)
- Subsequent: Manhart v. City of Los Angeles, Dept, 577 F.2d 98 (9th Cir. 1978)

Holding
- Charging women more for their retirement plan violates Title VII, even though women live longer than men, on average. However, the affected women cannot receive backpay for the past discrimination.

Court membership
- Chief Justice Warren E. Burger Associate Justices William J. Brennan Jr. · Potter Stewart; Byron White · Thurgood Marshall; Harry Blackmun · Lewis F. Powell Jr. William Rehnquist · John P. Stevens

Case opinions
- Majority: Stevens, joined by Stewart, White, Powell
- Concurrence: Blackmun (concurring in opinion in part IV only, concurring in judgment)
- Concur/dissent: Burger, joined by Rhenquist (joining part IV, dissenting to I-III); Marshall (concurring in parts I-III, dissenting to part IV)

Laws applied
- Title VII of the Civil Rights Act of 1964

City of Los Angeles Department of Water & Power v. Manhart, 435 U.S. 702 (1978) is a United States Supreme Court case in which the court held that employers cannot charge women more for pension benefits, despite women living longer than men, on average, and therefore receiving more retirement benefits.

== Background ==
Based on mortality tables and its own experience, the Los Angeles Department of Water & Power (LADWP) determined that its female employees would live longer than its male employees. This results in higher defined benefit pension benefits paid out to women over the course of their life. LADWP charged its female employees 14.84% higher contributions than comparable male employees. The women received the same monthly retirement benefits as men, despite paying approximately 15% more into the pension.

Despite the enactment of Title VII in 1964, it did not apply to governments, governmental agencies, or political subdivisions until the enactment of the Equal Employment Opportunity Act of 1972. In 1973, five female employees, as well as their union, the International Brotherhood of Electrical Workers sued LADWP on behalf of a class of women currently or formerly employed by LADWP. They asked for an injunction and for a refund of the excess money withheld from their paychecks. Following a California law passed while the lawsuit was pending, LADWP amended its plan, effective January 1, 1975, to remove the requirement for female employees to make higher pension contributions than male employees.

The Central District of California ordered a refund of all excess contributions, and the Ninth Circuit affirmed.

== Supreme Court ==
Justice John Paul Stevens delivered the 6–2 majority opinion vacating and remanding the Ninth Circuit's decision. The court agreed that LADPW violated Title VII by charging women more for pension benefits, but reversed the award of backpay, emphasizing the problems retroactive decisions pose for pension funds.

The court re-emphasized that action based on stereotype, even if true, violates Title VII. It is true that women, on average, live longer than men. But not all women live longer than all men, and Title VII makes clear that it applies to "individual[s]". Charging women, as a class, more in retirement benefits is illegal because it treats them differently based on a generalization. Title VII's goal of making sex irrelevant in the employment market is incompatible with differential take-home pay based on sex.

The court also rejected the argument that Congress intended a different meaning of "discrimination" in the context of group insurance coverage. Insurance pooling necessarily means that lower-risk individuals subsidize higher-risk individuals. It is still discrimination in this context to charge women more in pension benefits than men.

LADPW argued that its pay differential was based on longevity, not sex. This was quickly rejected by the court, because sex is just one factor that affects longevity, but was the only factor that LADPW used.

The court also rejected LADPW's argument that its decisions in pregnancy benefits cases, General Electric Co. v. Gilbert, and Geduldig v. Aiello compel a decision in its favor. In Gilbert, the court, relying on Geduldig, held that excluding pregnancy from a disability benefit plan was not a violation of Title VII. In Gilbert, the two groups were not men and women, as it is here, but pregnant women and everyone else. Because the second group contained members of both sexes, the plan did not discriminate based on sex.

In part IV of the opinion, the court reversed the grant of backpay awarded by the District Court and affirmed by the Ninth Circuit. In Albemarle Paper Co. v. Moody the court announced that backpay should generally be awarded in Title VII cases. However, it does allow for the presumption in favor of backpay to be overcome in light of the nature of equitable remedies. The court found several equitable considerations important here, including that courts had not previously answered the question, conflicting views among administrative agencies, and a reasonable belief that it would have violated Title VII to charge men more for the same retirement benefits. The court also emphasized the reliance interests of the insurance industry and warned against the potential consequences of sudden legal changes.

=== Blackmun's concurrence ===
Justice Blackmun argued that this case is inconsistent with Gilbert and Geduldig. He noted that Justices Stewart, White, and Powell either wrote or were in the majority for Gilbert and Geduldig (as here) but that Justice Stevens dissented in Gilbert and that Justice Thurgood Marshall, who mostly concurred in this case, dissented in both Gilbert and Geduldig. Justice Blackmun argued that Gilbert cannot be distinguished from this case, and therefore is undermined by Justice Stewarts decision. He joined only part IV of the opinion (denying backpay) and concurred in the judgment.

=== Burger's concurrence/dissent ===
Justice Burger, joined by Justice Rehnquist concurred as to part IV (denying backpay), but dissented as to parts I-III. Justice Burger emphasized the fact that women do, on average, live longer than men. Like life insurance, pension plans rely on various assumptions about individuals' longevity. Considering the "revolutionary" impact this decision will have on pension plans, Justice Burger would have required a clear statement of that intent in the statute. He argues that using sex as a factor in setting pension contributions takes into account all reasons, known and unknown, why women live longer than men.

Justice Burger also argued that the differential pension contributions were allowed by the Equal Pay Act of 1963. That act, incorporated into Title VII, allows discrimination where the payment is "made pursuant to ... a differential other than sex". Here, the other factor than sex is longevity. He argued that women were treated as individually as possible in light of the "unknowable length of each individual life". He also noted that such a pension payment differential would not be legal for any other protected class, like race, religion, or ethnicity.

=== Marshall's concurrence/dissent ===
Justice Marshall joined the courts opinion as to parts I-III (finding that the payment differential violated Title VII), but dissented as to part IV (denying backpay). In Albemarle Paper Co. v. Moody, the court held that backpay should only be withheld in special circumstances. Justice Marshall argued that those circumstances were not present here. Backpay would involve "a small percentage of amounts withheld from respondents' paychecks for pension purposes over a 33-month period" and no argument was made by the LADPW that the result would be devastating. He argued that the backpay claims of the plaintiffs here are more compelling than the typical Title VII plaintiff who gets backpay for a period when she was not working. Here, the plaintiffs earned the amount in question, but had it wrongfully taken in violation of Title VII.

== Impact ==
Following the decision, academics and commentators argued that the decision incentivizes discrimination against women and would result in self-segregation based on sex by employees according to the nature of employers' retirement plans.
