= Phillips v. Martin Marietta Corp. =

- Supreme Court of the United States

Argued December 9, 1970 Decided January 25, 1971
- Full case name: Phillips v. Martin Marietta Corporation
- Citations: 400 U.S. 542 (more) 91 S. Ct. 496; 27 L. Ed. 2d 613

Holding
- Under Title VII of the Civil Rights Act of 1964, an employer may not, in the absence of business necessity, refuse to hire women with pre-school-age children while hiring men with such children.

Court membership
- Chief Justice Warren E. Burger Associate Justices Hugo Black · William O. Douglas; John M. Harlan II · William J. Brennan Jr. Potter Stewart · Byron White; Thurgood Marshall · Harry Blackmun

Case opinions
- Per curiam
- Concurrence: Marshall

Laws applied
- Civil Rights Act of 1964, Title VII

Phillips v. Martin Marietta Corp., 400 U.S. 542 (1971), is a United States Supreme Court landmark case in which the Court held that under Title VII of the Civil Rights Act of 1964, an employer may not, in the absence of business necessity, refuse to hire women with pre-school-age children while hiring men with such children. It was the first gender-discrimination case under Title VII to reach the Court.

== Background ==
The Martin Marietta Corporation had a policy which did not allow the hiring of mothers with pre-school aged children because they were assumed to be unreliable employees; Ida Phillips, a mother, applied for a job at the company and was denied because of her circumstance as a mother. Phillips sued under Title VII claiming that the policy was discriminatory.

In an alliance between feminists and civil rights organizations, Phillips, a white woman, was represented by the Legal Defense and Education Fund of the NAACP.

== Opinion of the Court ==
The Supreme Court unanimously held that the Marietta Corp. policy did discriminate on the basis of sex and overturned the lower court’s finding, then sent the case back to the lower court for trial. In sending this case back, the Court suggested that the employer may be able to justify the discrimination using the bona fide occupational qualifications (BFOQ) exception.
