= LGBTQ rights in the United States =

- Location of the United States
- Legal status: Homosexuality: legal nationwide since 2003; (Lawrence v. Texas); Legal in various states since 1962
- Gender identity: State policies vary widely
- Military: Sexual orientation: Yes; Gender identity: No; Intersex status: No; "Don't ask, don't tell" policy repealed on September 20, 2011; Transgender ban since January 28, 2025; Partial ban on intersex people
- Discrimination protections: Prohibited employment discrimination since 2020 (Bostock v. Clayton County); Sexual orientation and gender identity protected under federal hate crime laws since 2009

Family rights
- Recognition of relationships: Same-sex marriage legal nationwide since 2015 (Obergefell v. Hodges)
- Adoption: Equal adoption rights for same-sex couples in all states since 2016

United States pride flag

Lesbian, gay, bisexual, transgender, and queer (LGBTQ) rights in the United States have developed over time, with public opinion and jurisprudence changing significantly since the late 1980s. Lesbian, gay and bisexual rights are considered advanced, but rights of transgender people have faced significant erosion since the beginning of Donald Trump's second presidency.

In 1962, beginning with Illinois, states began to decriminalize same-sex sexual activity, and in 2003, through Lawrence v. Texas, all remaining laws against same-sex sexual activity were invalidated. In 2004, beginning with Massachusetts, states began to offer same-sex marriage, and in 2015, through Obergefell v. Hodges, all states were required to offer it. In many states and municipalities, LGBTQ Americans are explicitly protected from discrimination in employment, housing, and access to public accommodations. Many LGBTQ rights in the United States have been established by the United States Supreme Court, which invalidated state laws banning protected class recognition based upon homosexuality, struck down sodomy laws nationwide, struck down Section 3 of the Defense of Marriage Act, made same-sex marriage legal nationwide, and prohibited employment discrimination against gay and transgender employees. LGBTQ-related anti-discrimination laws regarding housing and private and public services vary by state. Twenty-three states plus Washington, D.C., Guam, and Puerto Rico outlaw discrimination based on sexual orientation, and twenty-two states plus Washington, D.C., outlaw discrimination based on gender identity or expression. Family law also varies by state. Adoption of children by same-sex married couples is legal nationwide since Obergefell v. Hodges. According to Human Rights Campaign's 2024 state index, the states with the most comprehensive LGBTQ rights legislation include Vermont, California, Minnesota, Virginia, Massachusetts, Rhode Island, Maryland, New Mexico, Washington, Colorado, New York, Illinois, Oregon, Maine, Hawaii, and New Jersey.

Hate crimes based on sexual orientation or gender identity are punishable by federal law under the Matthew Shepard and James Byrd, Jr. Hate Crimes Prevention Act, which provides funding and technical assistance to jurisdictions to help more effectively investigate hate crimes, but many states lack laws that cover sexual orientation and/or gender identity.

Public opinion is overwhelmingly supportive of same-sex marriage and it is no longer considered a significant topic of public debate. A 2022 Grinnell College National Poll found that 74% of Americans agree that same-sex marriage should be a guaranteed right while 13% disagree. According to the General Social Survey, support for same-sex marriage among 18–34 year olds is near-universal.

Public opinion on transgender issues is divided. Top issues regarding gender identity include bathroom access, athletics, and transgender-related healthcare for minors.

After transgender people faced significant erosions in rights on the state level in Republican ran states over the course of three years, President Donald Trump issued an executive order on January 20, 2025, directing the United States government to remove all federal protections for transgender individuals and remove all recognition of transgender identity. The order declared that only male and female genders are recognized, and states that official documents must reflect biological sex (either male or female) assigned at birth. Previously, it was possible for US passport holders to receive either gender marker, or an "X" marker, simply by declaration during a passport application. Trump also banned trans people from military service and halted financing to gender-affirming care for individuals younger than 19. References to transgender people were scrubbed from government websites, in some cases by using the acronym "LGB." Over 350 pages about the LGBTQ community at large were removed entirely.

== Public opinion ==
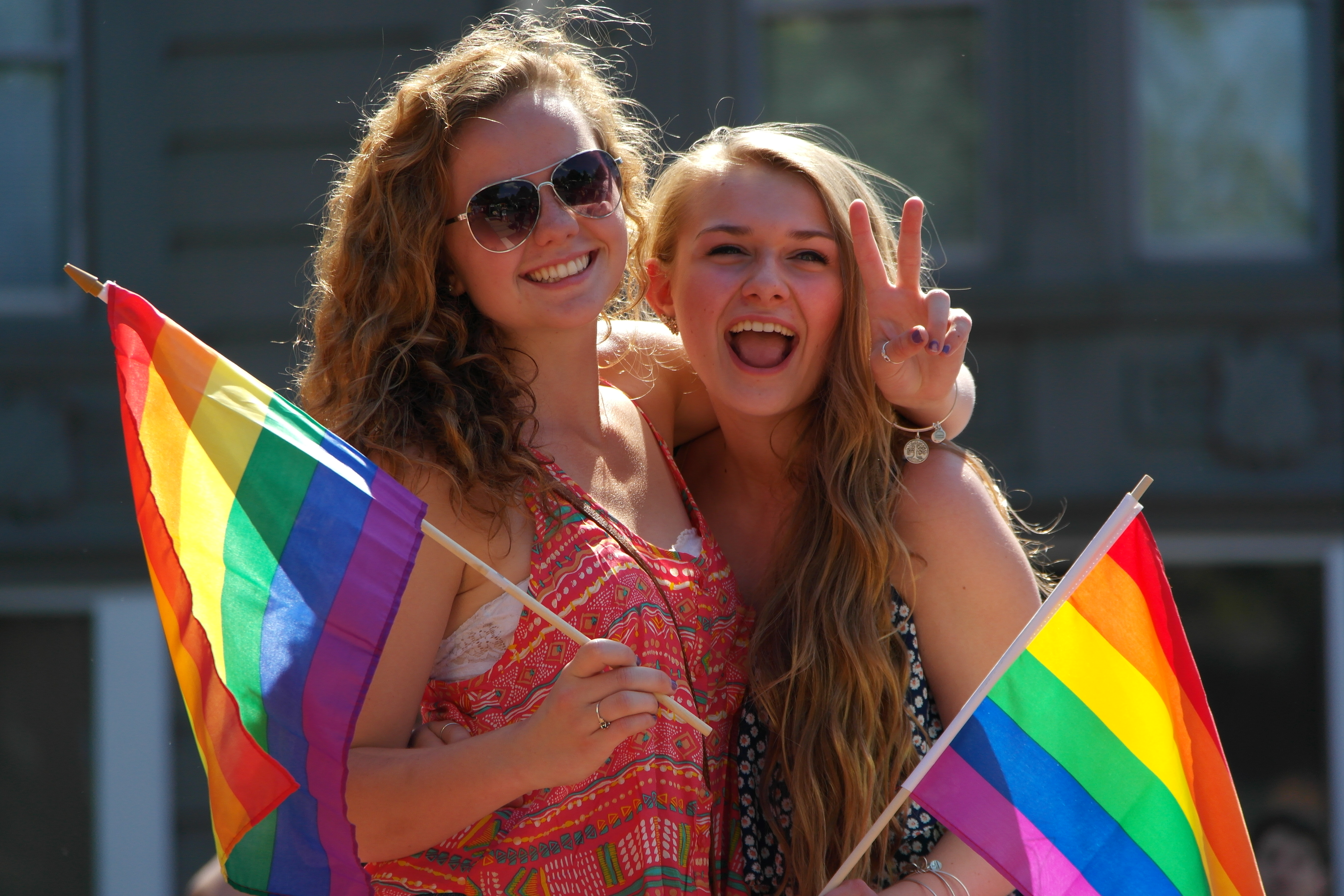
Two women at the Capital Pride Parade, Washington, DC (2014)

Public opinion of same-sex marriage in the United States has changed significantly since the late 1980s; in the early 2020s, an overwhelming majority of Americans approved of the legality of these marriages, with younger people more likely to express support.

From 1988 to 2009, support for recognized same-sex marriage increased between 1% and 1.5% per year, and accelerated thereafter, rising above 50% in Pew Research Center polling for the first time in 2011. Furthermore, a 2012 Gallup poll found 61% support for allowing gay and lesbian individuals to adopt children.

"The transformation of America's response to homosexuality", Jeremiah Garretson wrote in 2018, "has been — and continues to be — one of the most rapid and sustained shifts in mass attitudes since the start of public polling."

A 2021 Public Religion Research Institute poll about legal recognition of same-sex marriage found majority support (defined as at least 50% support) in 47 states, ranging from 50% in South Carolina to 85% in Massachusetts. A 48th state, Alabama, had plurality support (defined as more supporters than opponents, with neither side reaching 50%). Only Arkansas and Mississippi had majority opposition. When PRRI repeated the poll in 2022 and 2023, no state had majority opposition. A 2022 Quinnipiac University poll found 68% support nationwide. Gallup's 2022 and 2023 nationwide polls found 71% support; however, in 2024, this support decreased to 69%.

In 2024, the PRRI found that the support for same-sex marriage and for LGBTQ discrimination protections in US states is inversely correlated with the support for Christian nationalism.

Two 2025 Gallup polls indicated that support for LGBTQ+ rights was polarizing among party lines, with the first poll finding that 88% of Democrats and 76% of independents are in support of same-sex marriage, but only 41% of Republicans in support of same-sex marriage. The first poll also found that 86% of Democrats and 69% of independents saw same-sex relationships as morally acceptable, compared to only 38% of Republicans.

The second poll found that 69% of Americans, 90% of Republicans, 72% of independents and 41% of Democrats, supported laws that required transgender athletes to participate in sports aligned with their assigned sex at birth. 66% of Americans, 89% of Republicans, 66% of independents and 38% of Democrats, supported laws that required assigned sex at birth to be listed on government documents such as drivers licenses and passports. 40% of Americans, 70% of Democrats, 45% of independents and only 9% of Republicans, believe that gender transition is morally acceptable.

== Legality of same-sex sexual activity ==
Decriminalization of same-sex sexual intercourse in the United States 1962 1971 1972 1973 1974 1975 1976 1977 1978 1979 1980 1983 1985 1992 1993 1996 1997 1998 1999 2001 2003

On June 26, 2003, the Supreme Court ruled in Lawrence v. Texas that intimate consensual sexual conduct is part of the liberty protected by substantive due process under the Fourteenth Amendment. The majority opinion, written by Justice Anthony Kennedy, explicitly overruled Bowers v. Hardwick, a 1986 decision that found sodomy laws to be constitutional. Despite this ruling, some states have not repealed their sodomy laws and local law enforcement officers have used these statutes to harass or arrest gay people. After the repeal of "Don't Ask Don't Tell" in 2011, the U.S. Congress repealed sodomy laws in the U.S. military in 2014.

Prior to the 2003 Supreme Court ruling in Lawrence v. Texas, same-sex sexual activity was illegal in 14 U.S. states, Puerto Rico, and the U.S. military. By that time, 29 states, the District of Columbia, and five territories had repealed their state's sodomy laws by legislative action. Twelve states have had state Supreme Court or state Appeals courts rule that their state's sodomy laws were unconstitutional. Georgia, Louisiana, and Massachusetts, have all had their state sodomy laws struck down by the courts, but the legislatures have not repealed those laws. On April 18, 2013, the governor of Montana signed a bill repealing that state's sodomy law; it had previously been nullified by the Montana Supreme Court. On April 23, 2014, the governor of Virginia signed a bill repealing that state's sodomy law. Utah and Alabama repealed their sodomy laws in 2019 and Idaho did in 2022. On October 1, 2020, a bill repealing Maryland's sodomy law went into effect without the governor's signature, and a bill repealing its "unnatural sex practices" law went into effect without the governor's signature in May 2023. Minnesota also repealed its sodomy law in 2023.

11 states either have not yet formally repealed their laws against sexual activity among consenting adults or have not revised them to accurately reflect their true scope in the aftermath of Lawrence v. Texas. Often, the sodomy law was drafted to also encompass other forms of sexual conduct such as bestiality, and no attempt has subsequently succeeded in separating them. 8 states' statutes purport to ban all forms of sodomy, some including oral intercourse, regardless of the participants' genders: Georgia, Louisiana, Massachusetts, Michigan, Mississippi, North Carolina, Oklahoma and South Carolina. 3 states specifically target their statutes at same-sex relations only: Kansas, Kentucky, and Texas.

The age of consent in each jurisdiction varies but, in most jurisdictions, it is equal to the age of consent for heterosexual sex. The exception to this is Texas, whose statute books still hold an outdated Romeo and Juliet law that makes the age of consent for gay and lesbian teenagers unequal to that for heterosexual ones. Researchers have shown that sodomy law repeals led to a decline in the number of arrests for disorderly conduct, prostitution, and other sex offenses, as well as a reduction in arrests for drug and alcohol consumption, in line with the hypothesis that sodomy law repeals enhanced mental health and lessened minority stress.

== Recognition of marriage and adoption for same-sex couples ==
=== Marriage ===
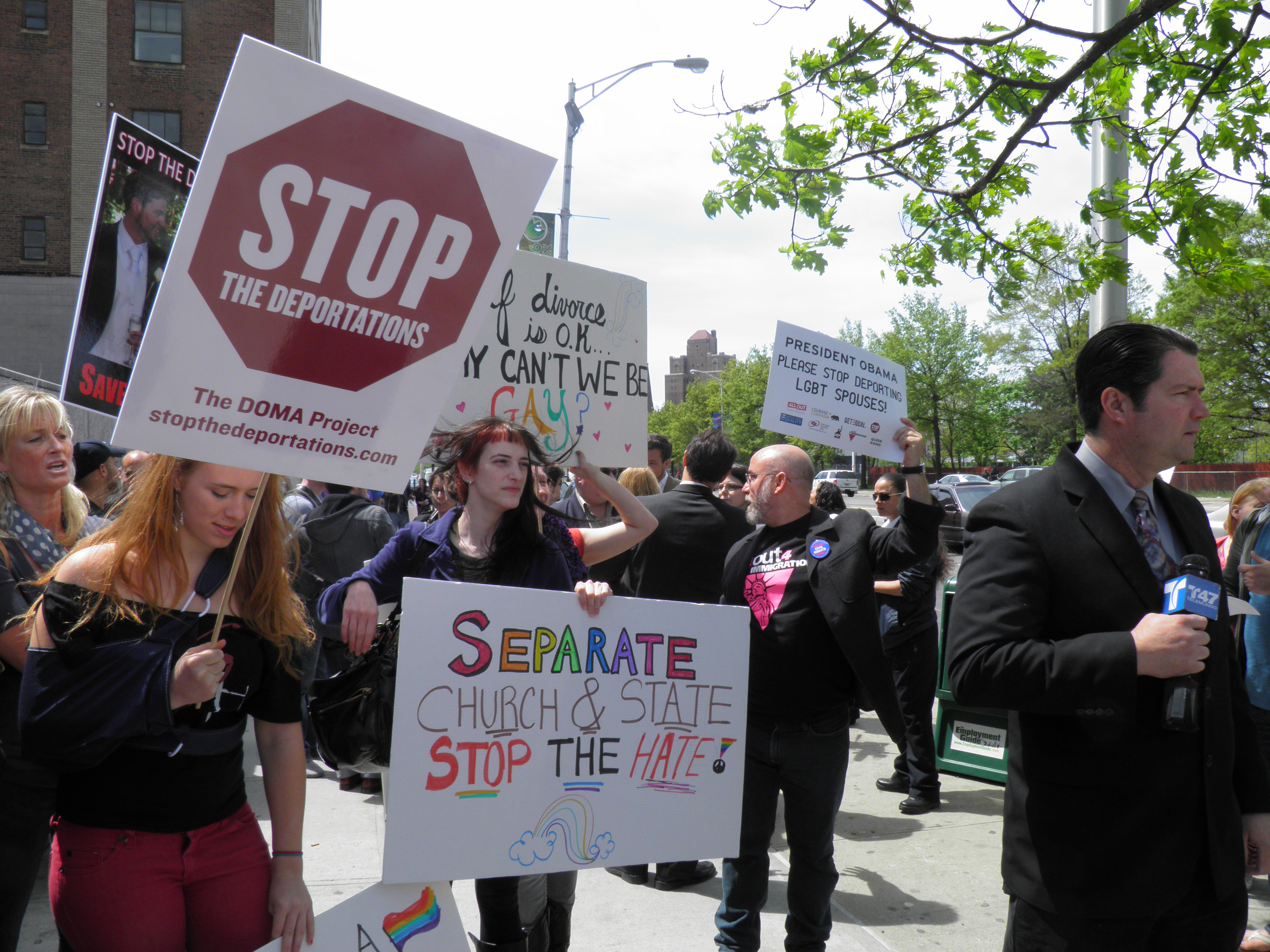
2011 protest in New Jersey by Garden State Equality in support of same-sex marriage rights and against deportation of LGBTQ spouses.

The movement to obtain civil marriage rights and benefits for same-sex couples in the United States began in the 1970s but remained unsuccessful for over 40 years. On May 17, 2004, Massachusetts became the first U.S. state and the sixth jurisdiction in the world to legalize same-sex marriage following the Supreme Judicial Court's decision six months earlier. Before nationwide legalization, same-sex marriage became legal in 36 states: 24 states by court order, nine by legislative action, and three by referendum. Some states had legalized same-sex marriage by more than one of the three actions.

On June 26, 2015, the Supreme Court ruled in Obergefell v. Hodges that states must license and recognize same-sex marriages. Consequently, same-sex marriage is legal in all 50 states, the District of Columbia, Puerto Rico, Guam, U.S. Virgin Islands, and Northern Mariana Islands. Currently, same-sex marriages are recognized in American Samoa, due to the Respect for Marriage Act. The legal status of same-sex marriage also varies in Native American tribal nations, as their reservations are considered sovereign entities and were not affected by the Supreme Court's legalization in 2015.

=== Civil unions ===
Prior to nationwide same-sex marriage, 15 U.S. states had civil unions or domestic partnerships. The first state to allow same-sex unions was Vermont in July 2000. Ten of these states retain those laws as a continued choice for same-sex couples and opposite-sex couples.

=== Adoption ===
Same-sex couples are allowed to adopt in states and territories following the ruling in Obergefell v. Hodges legalizing same-sex marriage. Prior to Obergefell, various states by legislative and judicial action had allowed joint adoption by same-sex couples.

=== Citizenship ===
Naturalized U.S. citizens whose biological children are born abroad may be unable to obtain U.S. citizenship for their children even if their spouse is also a U.S. citizen. This may disproportionately affect same-sex couples, given that typically only one spouse is biologically related to the child. In October 2020, with representation by Lambda Legal, Immigration Equality and law firm Morgan Lewis & Bockius; the United States Department of State withdrew its appeal of the verdict in Kiviti v. Pompeo, and declined to appeal Mize-Gregg v. Pompeo. The State Department's refusal to recognize children born overseas to married same-sex, American citizen couples as U.S. citizens was ruled to be unlawful by Federal district court judges in both cases.

=== Former restrictions ===
Defense of Marriage Act

The United States Congress enacted the Defense of Marriage Act (DOMA) in 1996, which forbade the federal government from recognizing same-sex marriages and relieved states of the requirement that they recognize same-sex unions performed in other jurisdictions. On June 26, 2013, Section 3 of DOMA ("Definition of marriage") was ruled unconstitutional by the U.S. Supreme Court in United States v. Windsor. The law became effectively unenforceable after the U.S. Supreme Court decision Obergefell v. Hodges (2015) and was fully repealed by the Respect for Marriage Act in 2022.

Former state bans on same-sex marriage

After the passage of the DOMA in 1996, many state legislators enacted state statutes, nicknamed mini-DOMA's, that ban same-sex marriage. After Massachusetts legalized same-sex marriage in 2004, 14 states amended their constitution to ban recognition of same-sex marriages and many banning civil unions as well. 28 states passed state constitutional amendments that banned same-sex marriage: Alabama, Alaska, Arizona, California, Colorado, Florida, Georgia, Idaho, Kansas, Kentucky, Louisiana, Michigan, Mississippi, Missouri, Montana, Nebraska, Nevada, North Carolina, North Dakota, Ohio, Oklahoma, Oregon, South Carolina, South Dakota, Tennessee, Texas, Utah, Virginia, and Wisconsin.

Hawaii voters approved a narrower constitutional amendment empowering the legislature to outlaw same-sex marriage, which they had already done in 1993. On November 6, 2012, Minnesota became the first state to vote down a proposed constitutional amendment banning same-sex marriage. The amendment failed with a 53% to 47% vote. All state constitutional and statutory bans on same-sex marriage were declared unconstitutional in June 2015 in Obergefell v. Hodges.

== Discrimination protections ==
Map of states, counties, and municipalities that have sexual orientation and gender identity discrimination prohibited in employment, housing, and public accommodations via statute, executive order, regulation, and/or court ruling: Sexual orientation and gender identity discrimination prohibited in employment, housing, and public accommodations Sexual orientation and gender identity discrimination prohibited in employment and public accommodations, but not housing Sexual orientation and gender identity discrimination prohibited in employment and housing, but not public accommodations Sexual orientation discrimination prohibited in employment, housing, and public accommodations, while gender identity discrimination prohibited in only employment and housing Sexual orientation discrimination prohibited in employment, housing, and public accommodations, while gender identity discrimination prohibited in only employment Sexual orientation discrimination prohibited in employment and housing, while gender identity discrimination prohibited in only employment Sexual orientation discrimination prohibited in employment and public accommodations, while gender identity discrimination prohibited in only employment Sexual orientation and gender identity discrimination prohibited in employment since Bostock v. Clayton County State has law which prohibits local discrimination protections for sexual orientation or gender identity in housing or public accommodations

The Equality Act, which had been introduced in the United States Congress in February 2021, would have outlawed discrimination based on sexual orientation and gender identity nationwide. However, shortly after his inauguration in 2025, Donald Trump signed an executive order ordering the non-enforcement discrimination laws for gender identity and sexual orientation. This is despite the Supreme Court ruling in Bostock v Clayton County that stated discrimination of this kind fell under Title VII of the 1964 Civil Rights Act, which outlawed discrimination based on someone's sex.

=== Anti-discrimination laws ===
U.S. federal law does not explicitly include protections against discrimination on the basis of sexual orientation or gender identity. In June 2020, the U.S. Supreme Court ruled that sexual orientation and gender identity are included under "sex" as a prohibited ground of employment discrimination in the Civil Rights Act of 1964. The ruling may impact other federal civil rights barring sex discrimination in education, health care, housing, and financial credit.

Explicit and comprehensive anti-discrimination protections based on sexual orientation and gender identity have been proposed by the United States Congress under the Equality Act, which was passed in the House by a vote of 236–173 on May 17, 2019, but stalled in the Senate. The bill was reintroduced by the 119th Congress on April 29, 2025 in both the House of Representatives and in the Senate.

During the 2024 United States presidential election, The Heritage Foundation, with contributors from the cabinet of Donald Trump, outlined legislation on Project 2025 for a large rollback of LGBTQ rights in the United States, a rollback of same-sex marriage in the US, as well as a rollback on all legal protections on the basis of "gender identity."

==== Employment ====
Map of states that have sexual orientation and gender identity discrimination prohibited in public and/or private employment via state statute, executive order, regulation, and/or case law. Note: Employment discrimination based on sexual orientation or gender identity is also prohibited under federal law. Sexual orientation and gender identity discrimination prohibited in public employment Gender identity discrimination prohibited in public employment Sexual orientation discrimination prohibited in public employment. Sexual orientation and gender identity discrimination prohibited in public employment. Sexual orientation and gender identity discrimination prohibited in public employment only No state-level prohibition on discrimination based on sexual orientation or gender identity Sexual orientation discrimination prohibited in public employment only

Employment discrimination refers to discriminatory employment practices such as bias in hiring, promotion, job assignment, termination, and compensation, and various types of harassment.

There is no federal statute explicitly addressing employment discrimination based on sexual orientation or gender identity. However, in June 2020, the U.S. Supreme Court ruled that sexual orientation and gender identity are included under "sex" as a prohibited ground of employment discrimination in the Civil Rights Act of 1964. This effectively means that in the U.S., no employer can fire an employee on the basis of sexual orientation or gender identity.

24 states, the District of Columbia, Puerto Rico, Guam, and over 140 cities and counties have enacted bans on discrimination based on sexual orientation and/or sexual identity. Additionally, some states have laws or regulations that ban discrimination based on gender identity and/or sexual orientation in public employment only.

Presidents have also established certain protections for some employees of the federal government by executive order. In 1995, President Bill Clinton's Executive Order 12968 establishing criteria for the issuance of security clearances included sexual orientation for the first time in its non-discrimination language: "The United States Government does not discriminate based on race, color, religion, sex, national origin, disability, or sexual orientation in granting access to classified information." It also said that "no inference" about suitability for access to classified information "may be raised solely on the basis of the sexual orientation of the employee." Clinton's Executive Order 13087 in 1998 prohibited discrimination based on sexual orientation in the competitive service of the federal civilian workforce. It applied to the large majority of federal employees, but not to the excepted services such as the military.

At the start of 2010, the Obama administration included gender identity among the classes protected against discrimination under the authority of the Equal Employment Opportunity Commission (EEOC). In 2012, the EEOC ruled that Title VII of the Civil Rights Act of 1964 does not allow gender identity-based employment discrimination because it is a form of sexual discrimination.

On July 21, 2014, Obama signed Executive Order 13672, adding "gender identity" to the categories protected against discrimination in hiring in the federal civilian workforce, and both "sexual orientation" and "gender identity" to the categories protected against discrimination in hiring and employment on the part of federal government contractors and sub-contractors. Obama's related Executive Order 13673 (Note: Executive Order 13673) required federal contractors to prove their compliance with labor laws, but Trump revoked this requirement on March 27, 2017.

As of June 15, 2020, all persons working for public employers that employ more than 15 people are protected from discrimination based solely on the grounds of sexual orientation or gender identity via the Supreme Court's landmark decision in Bostock v. Clayton County. The plaintiffs of the case include Gerald Bostock, Aimee Stephens, and Donald Zarda, each fired based upon their sexuality or gender identity. Two-thirds of registered U.S. voters agree with the Supreme Court's decision that employment nondiscrimination laws should protect LGBTQ identity, according to a HuffPost/YouGov poll conducted several days later.

==== Housing ====
States that prohibit housing discrimination based on sexual orientation or gender identity. HUD regulations require all housing providers that receive HUD funding not to discriminate against an individual's sexual orientation or gender identity. Prohibits housing discrimination based on sexual orientation and gender identity Prohibits housing discrimination based on sexual orientation only Does not factor sexual orientation or gender identity/unclear

The Office of Fair Housing and Equal Opportunity (FHEO) is an agency within the United States Department of Housing and Urban Development. FHEO is responsible for administering and enforcing federal fair housing laws and establishing policies that make sure all Americans have equal access to the housing of their choice. Housing discrimination refers to discrimination against potential or current tenants by landlords. In the United States, there is no federal law against such discrimination based on sexual orientation or gender identity, but at least twenty-two states and many major cities have enacted laws prohibiting it. See, for example, Washington House Bill 2661.

In 2012, the United States Department of Housing and Urban Development's Office of Fair Housing and Equal Opportunity issued a regulation called "Equal Access" to prohibit LGBTQ discrimination in federally-assisted housing programs. It ensures that the Department's core housing programs are open to all eligible persons, regardless of sexual orientation or gender identity. In 2019, however, there was an attempt to weaken the regulation.

The Office of Fair Housing and Equal Opportunity is responsible for enforcing a variety of fair housing laws, which prohibit discrimination in both privately owned and publicly assisted housing including:

- The Fair Housing Act
- Title VI of the Civil Rights Act of 1964
- Section 504 of the Rehabilitation Act of 1973
- Section 109 of Title I of the Housing and Community Development Act of 1974
- Title II of the Americans with Disabilities Act of 1990
- Architectural Barriers Act of 1968
- Age Discrimination Act of 1975
- Title IX of the Education Amendments Act of 1972

Among the landmark civil cases on gay rights in housing is Braschi v Stahl Associates Co. In 1989 New York Court of Appeals case that decided that plaintiff Miguel Braschi, the surviving partner of a same-sex relationship, counted as "family" under New York law and was thus able to continue living in a rent controlled apartment belonging to the deceased partner.

==== Medical facilities ====
On April 14, 2010, President Barack Obama issued an Executive Order to the Department of Health and Human Services to draft new rules for all hospitals accepting Medicare or Medicaid funds. They would require facilities to grant visitation and medical decision-making rights to gay and lesbian partners, as well as designees of others such as widows and widowers. Such rights are not protected by law in many states. Obama said he was inspired by the case of a Florida family, where one of the mothers died while her partner and four children were denied visitation by the hospital. On June 12, 2020, the Trump administration issued a new rule stating that sexual orientation and gender identity were not covered under the anti-discrimination protections of the Affordable Care Act, but this was reversed by the Biden administration, restoring the Obama-era policy.

According to the American advocacy group Human Rights Campaign, more than 470 local anti-LGBTQ bills have been introduced in 2023 by members of the conservative Republican Party, including more than 190 that are specifically anti-trans. While in past years conservatives have focused on bathroom bills and banning trans athletes from sports, most bills passed in 2023 have focused on banning gender-affirming health care. Critics noted that these events are a part of the wider culture war between liberals and conservatives in the U.S.

== Hate crime laws ==
Current U.S. LGBTQ hate crimes laws by state. A national hate crimes law encompasses both sexual orientation and gender identity. Sexual orientation and gender identity recognized in state hate crimes law Sexual orientation recognized in state hate crimes law State hate crimes law uninclusive of sexual orientation or gender identity

Hate crime laws (also known as bias crimes laws) protect against crimes motivated by feelings of enmity against a protected class. Until 2009, a federal law defined hate crimes committed on the basis of a person's race, color, religion, or nation origin when engaging in a federally protected activity. In October 2009, Congress passed the Matthew Shepard Act, which expanded the definition of hate crimes to include gender, sexual orientation, gender identity, and disability. It removed the requirement that the victim of a hate crime be engaged in a federally protected activity. Obama signed the legislation on October 28, 2009.

Two statutes, the Hate Crime Statistics Act (1990) and the Campus Hate Crimes Right to Know Act (1997), require the Department of Justice and the Federal Bureau of Investigation (FBI), as well as college/university campus security authorities, to collect and publish hate crime statistics.

As of December 2023, 46 states, the District of Columbia, Puerto Rico, the US Virgin Islands, and the Commonwealth of the Northern Mariana Islands have statutes criminalizing various types of bias-motivated violence or intimidation (the exceptions are Arkansas, Georgia, South Carolina, and Wyoming). Each of these statutes covers bias on the basis of race, religion, and ethnicity; 34 cover disability; 34 of them cover sexual orientation; 28 cover gender; 13 cover age; 23 cover gender identity; five cover political affiliation. 31 states and the District of Columbia have statutes creating a civil cause of action, in addition to the criminal penalty, for similar acts. Twenty-seven states and the District of Columbia have statutes requiring the state to collect hate crime statistics; 16 of these cover sexual orientation.

In Wisconsin v. Mitchell (1993) the Supreme Court unanimously held that state penalty-enhancement laws for hate crimes were constitutional and did not violate First Amendment rights to freedom of thought and expression.

Laws that prohibit hate speech, including those that relate to sexual orientation or gender identity, are considered unconstitutional, due to the First Amendment's broad protections for free speech.

=== Gay panic defense ===
==== Federal laws ====
In 2018, Senator Edward Markey (D-MA) and Representative Joseph Kennedy III (D-MA) introduced S.3188 and H.R.6358, respectively, which would prohibit a federal criminal defendant from asserting, as a defense, that the nonviolent sexual advance or an individual or a perception or belief of the gender, gender identity, or expression, or sexual orientation of an individual excuses or justifies conduct or mitigates the severity of an offense. Both bills died in committee. In June 2019, the bill was reintroduced in both houses of Congress as the Gay and Trans Panic Defense Prohibition Act of 2019 (S.1721 and H.R.3133). It has been reintroduced in both the 2021 and 2023 sessions.

==== State laws ====
As of October 2023, 17 states and the District of Columbia have banned the so-called "gay panic defense": California, Colorado, Connecticut, Delaware, Hawaii, Illinois, Maine, Maryland, Nevada, New Hampshire New Jersey, New York, Oregon, Rhode Island, Vermont, Virginia, Washington.

== Military service ==
Transgender military service by country and territory Allows transgender military service Prohibits transgender military service Unknown if transgender military service allowed Has no military

Although the U.S. military discharged soldiers for homosexual acts throughout the eighteenth and nineteenth century, U.S. military law did not expressly prohibit homosexuality or homosexual conduct until February 4, 1921. On May 5, 1950, the Uniform Code of Military Justice was passed by Congress and signed into law by President Harry S. Truman, and became effective on May 31, 1951. Article 125 forbade sodomy among all military personnel, defining it as "any person subject to this chapter who engages in unnatural carnal copulation with another person of the same or opposite sex or with an animal is guilty of sodomy. Penetration, however slight, is sufficient to complete the offence." Application of Article 125 was severely limited by the 2003 U.S. Supreme Court decision in Lawrence v. Texas, and it was amended only to apply to 'forcible sodomy' on December 26, 2013, when President Barack Obama signed into law the National Defense Authorization Act for Fiscal Year 2014. The National Defense Authorization Act for Fiscal Year 2017 finally repealed the article and its classification of sodomy, as a crime separate from rape, altogether.

Prior to 1993, lesbian and gay people were not permitted to serve in the U.S. military. Under the "Don't ask, don't tell" (DADT) policy enacted that year, they were permitted to do so only if they did not disclose their sexual orientation. The Don't Ask, Don't Tell Repeal Act of 2010 permitted homosexual men and women to serve openly in the armed forces once designated government officials certified that the military was prepared for the repeal. Since September 20, 2011, gays, lesbians, and bisexuals have been able to serve openly.

On July 13, 2015, Defense Secretary Ashton Carter said that the current regulations banning transgender individuals from serving were outdated, and announced a six-month study to determine if lifting the ban would have any impact on the military's effectiveness. On June 30, 2016, Carter announced that the ban on transgender troops from openly serving had been lifted. The policy went into effect on October 1, 2016, and training on transgender issues was scheduled to begin a month later.

On October 24, 2016, 10 soldiers in the United States Army became the first to openly petition for a sex change since the ban on service by transgender individuals was lifted. The military was originally scheduled to complete its adjustment to openly transgender troops by July 2017. That month, however, Trump declared in a tweet that transgender people would be prohibited from serving in the military. The next day, Chairman of the Joint Chiefs of Staff General Joseph Dunford said, "There will be no modifications to the current policy until the President's direction has been received by the Secretary of Defense and the Secretary has issued implementation guidance. In the meantime, we will continue to treat all of our personnel with respect."

Trump later published a memo on August 25, 2017, directing that an implementation plan be submitted to him by the Secretary of Defense and the Secretary of Homeland Security by February 2018. In November 2018, the Trump administration formally asked the Supreme Court to issue a ruling on the matter, even though lower courts were still hearing appeals. Though the Supreme Court initially refused this request, on January 22, 2019, it granted temporary permission to the Trump administration to proceed with its ban, and on March 12 the Department of Defense released a memorandum describing the terms of the ban to take effect on April 12, 2019.

The memorandum offers some protection for existing military personnel who were already diagnosed with "gender dysphoria" or who were already serving in their self-designated gender before the memorandum was issued. However, new personnel must serve in their birth gender/sex and are disqualified from service if they have a recent history of gender dysphoria or if they have ever received hormones and surgery related to gender transition. Two bipartisan bills in Congress are pushing back against the ban.

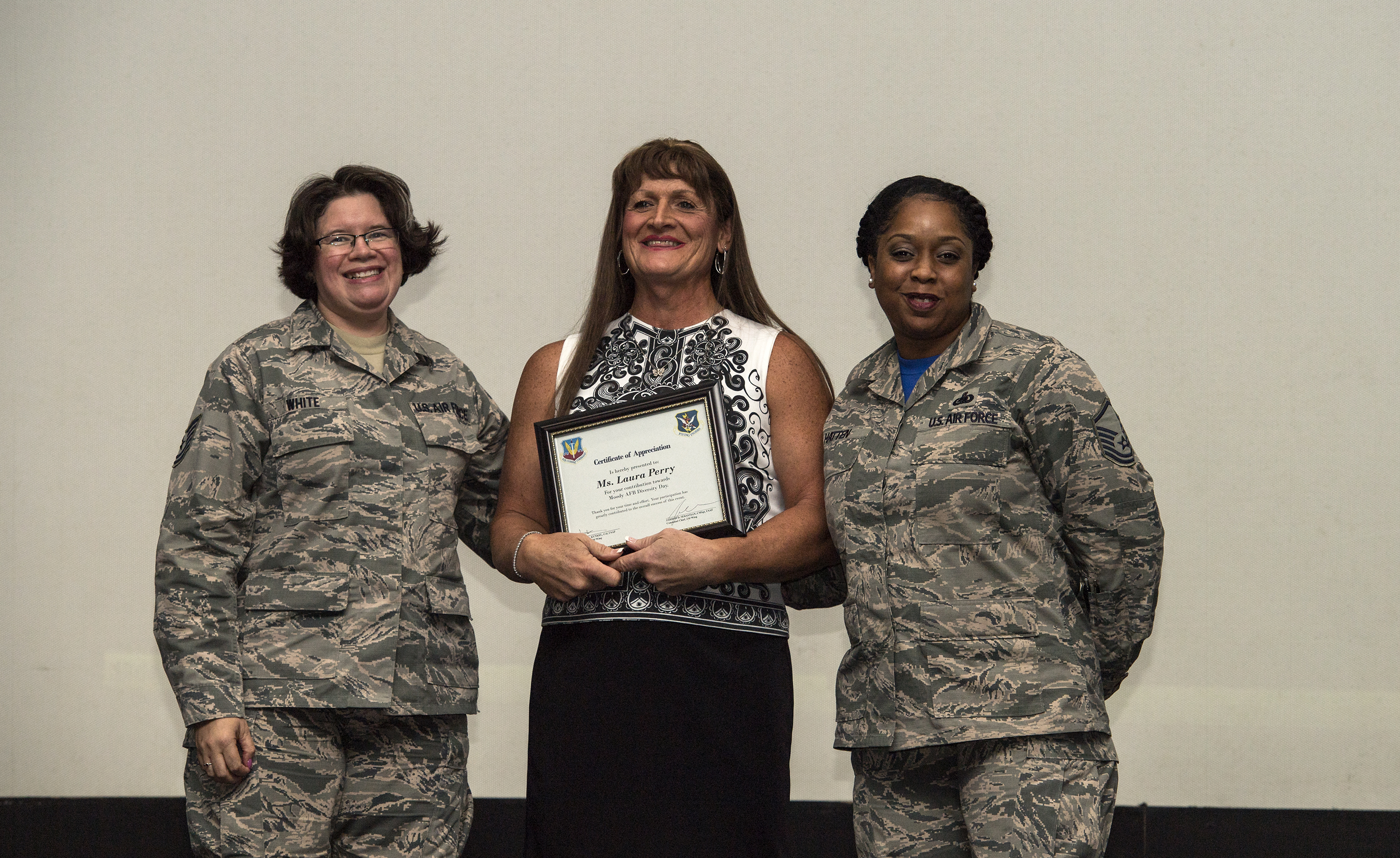
Retired U.S. Air Force Maj. Laura Perry in 2016. Picture removed online by the Trump administration in 2025.

As of January 20, 2020, transgender women and other individuals assigned male at birth were still required to sign-up for the Selective Service.

On January 25, 2021, the new Biden administration revoked Trump's ban through an executive order, reverting the policy regarding transgender people and military service to what it was in 2016 under the Obama administration. Transgender personnel are now allowed to serve in the military under varying conditions and requirements. On April 30, 2021, the United States Department of Defense enacted a new policy calling for better medical access and gender marker assistance to transgender people serving in the United States Military.

As of May 8, 2025, transgender individuals are banned from enlisting in and serving in the U.S. military, except under narrow waivers for those who have not undergone gender transition, have maintained stability in their birth sex for at least 36 consecutive months, serve in roles critical to warfighting capabilities, and are willing to adhere to all standards associated with their birth sex. Transgender civilian employees at the DoD and private military companies are not subject to the military ban.

== Prison ==
=== Solitary confinement ===
More than 8,400 detained migrants—over a five-year period spanning both the Obama and Trump administrations—were placed in solitary confinement, which remains an ongoing practice as of May 2019. In half of the cases, detainees were being punished, but in the other half, the confinement was due to the person's mental illness, physical disability, or sexual orientation. Journalists identified six suicides among this population.

=== Conjugal visits ===
In the United States, four states permit conjugal visits to prisoners: California, Connecticut, New York, and Washington; all of these U.S. states have legalized same-sex marriage in June 2015. In June 2007, California, following the enactment in 2005 of a state law requiring state agencies to provide the same rights to domestic partners as to married couples, became the first U.S. state to allow same-sex conjugal visits. The new rules allowed for visits only by registered same-sex married couples or domestic partners, provided that the same-sex marriage or domestic partnership was established before the prisoner was incarcerated. In New York, prior to the vote on same-sex visits, this state allowed 27 out of its 60 facilities to allow same-sex conjugal visits, but this law was not enforced state wide until April 2011. In 2014, both New Mexico and Mississippi banned conjugal visits.

== Transgender rights ==
From April 2022 to January 2025, United States passports gave the sex/gender options of male, female and X by self determination. Discrimination rates are very high for the transgender community and especially for transgender people of color. Some frequent examples of discrimination and other forms of oppression faced by the transgender community are violence and hate crimes, homelessness, poverty, sexual assault, housing discrimination, employment discrimination, harassment, bullying, disproportionate rates of arrest and incarceration, prison and immigration violence and mistreatment, airport security humiliation, HIV/AIDS and health disparities, governmental/bureaucratic barriers to transitioning (documents and surgery requirements), economic and societal barriers to transitioning (the high costs of medical care and the frequent denial of care), to name only a few.

Some who experience exclusion from the workforce, turn to survival crimes, such as sex work, in order to have an income as a direct result of economic oppression and discrimination. With the passage of the Fight Online Sex Trafficking Act (FOSTA) and Stop Enabling Sex Traffickers Act (SESTA) bills, those individuals who turn to sex work are put in more danger because they are forced to turn back to more dangerous methods of finding work, such as through pimps and working on the streets, than online forums where they were able to vet clients.

Frequently, the media, and politicians sensationalize transgender identities and oppression is reinforced. Aware of this trend, in 2016, a coalition of over 250 anti-sexual assault and domestic violence organizations have released a joint letter decrying the trend of portraying transgender people in restrooms as sexual predators as untrue and harmful. Likewise, GLAAD has released a media guide for reporters covering restroom usage in relation to the transgender community.

In 2022, over 230 anti-transgender bills were introduced in state legislatures in a coordinated national campaign to target transgender rights, and over 350 in 2023. Many of these bills became law.

Many transgender advocates also advocate for converting single-occupant, gender-segregated restrooms into single-occupant, all-gender restrooms by simply changing the signs due to the high rates of harassment and even violence faced by the transgender community when accessing gender-segregated restrooms according to their gender expression. All-gender/gender-neutral restrooms are also beneficial to nursing mothers, parents with different-sex children, and people with disabilities. Transgender advocates affirm all-gender restrooms as well as access to gendered restrooms as a matter of choice, safety, privacy, and dignity.

=== Identity documents ===
Legal requirements each state has for altering the sex on one's birth certificate as of June 2025. State updates birth certificates using an administrative process and does not require provider documentation (15 states) State updates birth certificates using an administrative process or a court order and requires provider documentation of "appropriate treatment" (18 states, 3 territories + D.C.) State updates birth certificates, but it requires either an administrative process or a court order with proof of surgery (10 states, 2 territories) State does not allow for amending the gender marker on the birth certificate (7 states)

An executive order signed in the first hours of President Donald Trump's second administration defined, for all purposes of the federal government, sex as binary, removing the federal recognition of non binary genders. It is also expected to prevent the federal government from allowing gender changes by people who are transgender.

Different procedures and requirements for legal name changes and gender marker changes on birth certificates, drivers licenses, social security identification and passports exist and can be inconsistent. Many states require gender reassignment surgery to change their name and gender marker. Also, documents that do not match each other can present difficulties in conducting personal affairs - particularly those which require multiple, matching forms of identification. Furthermore, having documents that do not match a person's gender presentation has been reported to lead to harassment and discrimination.

==== Birth certificates ====
U.S. states make their own laws about birth certificates, and state courts have issued varied rulings about transgender people.

Most states permit the name and sex to be changed on a birth certificate, either by amending the existing birth certificate or by issuing a new one, although some require medical proof of sex reassignment surgery to do so.

Tennessee will not change the sex on a birth certificate at all, under any circumstances. In February 2020, the Idaho House of Representatives passed a similar bill. Oklahoma banned gender change in 2021. In 2022, Montana banned gender change.

==== Drivers' licenses ====
As of June 2025, all U.S. States except for Kansas, Texas, Tennessee, and Florida allow the gender marker to be changed on a driver's license, although the requirements for doing so vary by state. Often, the requirements for changing one's driver's license are less stringent than those for changing the marker on the birth certificate. For example, until August 1, 2015, the state of Massachusetts required sex reassignment surgery for a birth certificate change, but only a form including a sworn statement from a physician that the applicant is in fact the new gender to correct the sex designation on a driver's license. As of November 2019, the Commonwealth of Massachusetts no longer requires any documentation or a sworn statement from a medical doctor in order to change one's gender marker on their drivers license/state ID. In order to change the gender marker, one only needs to fill out a new drivers license/ID card application reflecting the correct information. The state of Virginia had policies similar to those of Massachusetts, requiring Sex reassignment surgery (SRS) for a birth certificate change, but not for a driver's license change. Virginia removed the requirement for surgery to change the gender marker in September 2020.

Sometimes, the states' requirements and laws conflict with and are dependent on each other; for example, a transgender woman who was born in Tennessee but living in Kentucky will be unable to have the gender marker changed on her Kentucky driver's license. This is due to the fact that Kentucky requires an amended birth certificate reflecting the person's accurate gender, but the state of Tennessee does not change gender markers on birth certificates at all.

On July 1, 2023, Kansas Senate Bill 180 went into effect, mandating that gender markers on birth certificates and driver's licenses reflect a person's sex at birth – reversing a 2019 federal equal protection lawsuit settlement which allowed birth certificates to be changed to reflect a person's gender identity.

In January 2024, Florida banned changing the gender marker on driver's licenses. Additionally, any person "misrepresenting" their gender would be subject to criminal and civil penalties.

In addition, a number of states and city jurisdictions have passed legislation to allow a third gender marker on official identification documents (see below).

==== Cases ====
In May 2015, six Michigan transgender people filed Love v. Johnson in the United States District Court for the Eastern District of Michigan, challenging the state's policy requiring the information on a person's driver's license match the information on their birth certificate. This policy requires transgender people to change the information on their birth certificates in order to change their driver's licenses, which at the time of filing was not possible in Tennessee, Nebraska and Ohio, where three of the plaintiffs were born, and requires a court order in South Carolina, where a fourth was born. The remaining two residents were born in Michigan, and would be required to undergo surgery to change their birth certificates. The plaintiffs in the case are represented by the American Civil Liberties Union.

In November 2015, Judge Nancy Edmunds denied the State of Michigan's motion to dismiss the case.

==== Passports ====
The U.S. State Department determines what identifying biographical information is placed on passports. On June 10, 2010, the policy on gender changes was amended to allow permanent gender marker changes to be made with the statement of a physician that "the applicant has had appropriate clinical treatment for gender transition to the new gender.";. The previous policy required a statement from a surgeon that gender reassignment surgery was completed. From April 11, 2022 to January 21, 2025, American passports gave the sex/gender options of male, female and X by self determination.

Since January 2025, trans and non-binary people have been prevented from altering their gender markers on passports, despite a court ruling to the contrary.

==== Third gender option ====
States with X gender markers on driver's licenses States with X designation available on driver's licenses as of April 2022 Enters in to force in 2024 Entry date not yet finalized X designation unavailable

From 2022 to 2025, the U.S. federal government recognizes a third gender option on passports. Other countries including Australia, New Zealand, India, Nepal, Pakistan, Bangladesh, Germany, Malta, and Canada have begun recognizing this. Third genders have traditionally been acknowledged in a number of Native American cultures as "two spirit" people, in traditional Hawaiian culture as the māhū, and as the fa'afafine in American Samoa. Similarly, immigrants from traditional cultures that acknowledge a third gender would benefit from such a reform, including the muxe gender in southern Mexico and the hijra of south Asian cultures.

On June 10, 2016, an Oregon circuit court ruled that a resident, Elisa Rae Shupe, could obtain a non-binary gender designation. The Transgender Law Center believes this to be "the first ruling of its kind in the U.S."

=== Gender-affirming care bans ===
Gender-affirming care for minors has been available in the U.S. for more than a decade and is endorsed by major medical associations, but it has increasingly come under attack in many conservative legislatures. Of the approximately 1.6 million Americans who are transgender, about 300,000 are under the age of 18. According to the ACLU, in 2023 alone, over 500 anti-LGBTQ bills were submitted in the US, over 130 of which were about healthcare. Efforts to prohibit gender-affirming care for minors had begun several years earlier, but did not receive much attention from state legislatures until more recently. The conservative organization Do No Harm was influential in developing model legislation that appeared starting in 2022 in Arkansas, Florida, Iowa, Mississippi, Montana, New Hampshire, and West Virginia legislatures.

Many Democrat-controlled states have gone in the opposite direction and enacted laws protecting access to gender affirming care for minors and adults. These laws, often called "shield" laws, often explicitly combine protections for gender-affirming care and abortion and cover a variety of protections, including protecting both providers and patients from being punished, mandating insurance providers to cover the procedures, and acting as "sanctuary states" that protect patients traveling to the state from other states that have banned such treatments among other provisions.

Bans on gender-affirming care have been criticized as governmental interference with the doctor–patient relationship, and taking away healthcare decisions from parents and families for their children. State level bans on gender-affirming care in the United States have led some families with transgender children to move out of their states. As of October 2023, approximately 105,200 transgender youth aged 13 to 17 lived in states where gender affirming care is banned for minors. However, around 26,000 of those youth are currently still able to access care in their state due to court orders that prohibit enforcement of the laws. Conversely, around 146,700 transgender youth live in states with shield laws. An analysis from KFF in late January 2024 estimated that 38% of trans youth between the ages of 13–17 in the United States lived in states with laws limiting youth access to gender-affirming care.

The American Psychological Association approved a policy statement in February 2024 supporting unobstructed access to health care and evidence-based clinical care for transgender, gender-diverse, and nonbinary children, adolescents, and adults, as well as opposing state bans and policies intended to limit access to such care.

In May 2024, Tennessee became the first state to prohibit helping a child access gender-affirming care without the consent of their parent or guardian. The child's parents are allowed to sue the person who assisted the pursuit of gender-affirming care. There is no criminal penalty.

On October 17, 2024, Texas attorney general Ken Paxton filed suit against a doctor who allegedly provided gender-affirming care to 21 minors after the treatments had been banned for minors in Texas, the first time that such a suit has been brought in the U.S.

On March 10, 2026, the United States Court of Appeals for the Fourth Circuit ruled that West Virginia may continue to prohibit gender-affirming procedures for adults from being covered by Medicaid, arguing that the law applied to procedures and not individuals, and that it was "not irrational for a legislature to encourage citizens to appreciate their sex".

==== Bans for minors ====
As of August 2025, 27 states had enacted some form of ban on gender-affirming care for minors, 19 of which were enacted in 2023. However, 16 of these bans are being challenged in court as of January 2024. Furthermore, only 21 of the 27 states have complete bans which are fully in effect. Four states have only partial bans and two are currently blocked from taking effect. While some states have banned all forms of medical transition, others such as Arizona, Nebraska and Georgia have banned only specific types such as hormone therapy or surgery. Seven states have exceptions which allow minors who were already receiving gender affirming care prior to the ban to continue their treatments.

Currently, all 27 states make exceptions for puberty blockers, hormones and surgery for cisgender and intersex children. There is only one state, Missouri, that has a ban which is set to expire after a certain period of time. Nearly all states with restrictions include specific provisions with penalties for providers and 4 states include provisions directed at parents or guardians. An additional 4 states include laws/policies that impact school officials such as teachers and counselors, among others.

Laws which are currently unenforceable due to a court injunction
Laws which only partially ban gender affirming care for minors

Bans of gender-affirming healthcare for people under 18
State	Authority	Signed	Effective	Notes
Arkansas	State legislature	April 6, 2021	August 12, 2025	On April 6, 2021, the legislature—overriding Governor Asa Hutchinson's veto on a bill that banned puberty blockers, hormones, and surgery for minors and from referring them to other providers. Courts later temporarily and then permanently blocked the law. However, on August 12, 2025, the Eighth Circuit Court of Appeals overturned the lower court ruling and allowed the state to enforce the law.
Texas	Texas AG Ken Paxton Governor Greg Abbott	February 22, 2022 June 2, 2023	Blocked by injunction (order) September 1, 2023 (legislation)	In February 2022, the state Attorney General ordered a ban on gender-affirming care for trans youth, with criminal penalties for failing to report suspected violations. However, the order is currently blocked by injunction. In June 2023, the governor signed a law to ban this care for minors. On August 25, 2023, a district court judge blocked the law from taking effect. In response, the Attorney General's office filed an appeal with the Texas Supreme Court, a move that automatically pauses the judge's injunction and allowed the law to go into effect on September 1, 2023, as originally planned. On June 28, 2024, the Texas Supreme Court upheld the law.
Alabama	Governor Kay Ivey	April 8, 2022	May 8, 2022	It is a felony for a medical provider to give gender-affirming healthcare to transgender people under 19 (the age of majority in Alabama). In May 2022, a federal judge ruled that the ban on surgery was enforceable. However, the ban on puberty blockers and hormones was not enforceable while the law is challenged in court. In August 2023, the 11th U.S. Circuit Court of Appeals reversed the decision, allowing the ban on puberty blockers and hormones to take effect.
Utah	Governor Spencer Cox	January 27, 2023		
South Dakota	Governor Kristi Noem	February 13, 2023		
Mississippi	Governor Tate Reeves	February 28, 2023		
Tennessee	Governor Bill Lee	March 2, 2023		In June 2025, the Supreme Court ruled in United States v. Skrmetti (2025) that a ban on gender-affirming care for minors in Tennessee did not violate the Equal Protection Clause, as it was a restriction of medical procedures based on age (which is not a protected class) and not inherently discriminating against individuals on the basis of sex. In July 2025, Puerto Rico because the first place in the United States to pass a ban on gender-affirming care for people over 18, banning it for anyone under 21 years of age. Puerto Rico's LGBTQ+ Federation immediately announced plans to challenge the ban in court.
Florida	Florida Board of Medicine Governor Ron DeSantis		August 26, 2024 (legislation) Blocked (state board of medicine rule)	The state board of medicine rule took effect on March 16, 2023. Additionally, on May 17, 2023, Governor DeSantis signed a ban into law, and it took effect immediately. It applies only to new patients, not those who were already receiving gender-affirming care. However, on June 6, 2023, a court temporarily blocked enforcement of both the board rule and the law. In June 2024, a judge permanently blocked the law from taking effect. In August 2024, the 11th Circuit Court of Appeals stayed the permanent injunction while the matter is appealed.
Iowa	Governor Kim Reynolds	March 22, 2023		
Georgia	Governor Brian Kemp	March 23, 2023	July 1, 2023	Bans hormones and surgery while continuing to allow puberty blockers. Minors who began hormones prior to July 1, 2023, are allowed to continue treatment.
West Virginia	Governor Jim Justice	March 29, 2023		The bill made exceptions for minors who have received parental consent and are diagnosed with "severe gender dysphoria" by two doctors. Due to this exception, experts did not expect the ban to have much of an impact. In May 2025, Governor Patrick Morrisey signed a bill ending this exception.
Kentucky	State legislature	March 29, 2023	July 14, 2023	The legislature overrode Governor Andy Beshear's veto, banning gender-affirming healthcare for trans minors. Federal appeals judges allowed the ban to remain in effect during legal challenges to overturn it.
Arizona	Governor Doug Ducey	March 30, 2022	March 31, 2023	Bans gender-affirming surgery for minors, but not hormones and puberty blockers. The bill also makes some exceptions, including in the case of someone born intersex. In mid 2023, a new Governor, Katie Hobbs reversed course by signing a series of executive orders which include shield-style protections for gender-affirming care, ensuring that it remains legal in Arizona. It also bans conversion therapy, requires insurance plans to cover gender-affirming care and bars state agencies from cooperating with civil and criminal cases in states where gender-affirming health care is illegal.
Idaho	Governor Brad Little	April 4, 2023	April 15, 2024	It would also make it a felony for any medical practitioner to help a minor seek gender-affirming treatment. On December 27, 2023, a federal judge blocked the law from taking effect. On April 15, 2024, the US Supreme Court responded to an emergency request filed in February by temporarily allowing the ban to go into effect while further legal challenges to it play out in the lower courts. The ruling did not resolve the underlying legal challenges raised by the case nor did the justices rule on the larger issue of bans on gender-affirming treatment for minors. The ruling also does not apply to the two plaintiffs in the lawsuit.
Indiana	Governor Eric Holcomb	April 5, 2023	February 27, 2024	On June 16, 2023, a federal judge temporarily blocked the law from taking effect. On February 27, 2024, the 7th Circuit Court of Appeals reversed the decision allowing the ban to take effect.
North Dakota	Governor Doug Burgum	April 20, 2023		On April 20, 2023, North Dakota Governor Doug Burgum signed a law criminalizing trans health care for minors. However, the law notably makes exceptions for medication treatment for "rare circumstances with parental consent". The law also allows medication treatment for early onset puberty and minors who were already receiving gender-affirming care will still be able to receive treatment.
Montana	Governor Greg Gianforte	April 28, 2023	Blocked	On September 27, 2023, a Montana District Court judge prevented it from taking effect. On December 11, 2024, the Montana Supreme Court upheld the ban and suggested the ban is likely unconstitutional and sent it back to the district court for trial. If the ban does take effect, some treatments would remain legal for minors who are not suffering from gender dysphoria.
North Carolina	State legislature		August 17, 2023	Ban on gender-affirming care, such as hormones, puberty blockers, and surgery, for minors. The ban only applies to transgender children and still allows such treatments for intersex and cisgender children. The ban also only applies to new patients. Transgender children who started treatment prior to August 1, 2023, will be allowed to continue receiving treatment. Governor Roy Cooper vetoed the bill on July 5, 2023, but the state legislature overruled his veto on August 17, therefore making the bill law.
Missouri	Governor Mike Parson	June 7, 2023	August 28, 2023	People receiving puberty blockers or hormones before the ban went into effect may continue taking them. Otherwise, blockers and hormones are banned until 2027. Surgery is also banned.
Louisiana	State Legislature		January 1, 2024	On June 29, 2023, John Bel Edwards vetoed a ban on blockers, hormones, and surgery for minors. On July 18, the Louisiana State Legislature overrode his veto.
Oklahoma	Governor Kevin Stitt	May 1, 2023		On May 1, 2023, Governor Kevin Stitt signed a bill that makes it a felony for doctors to provide gender-transition medical care for anyone under the age of 18. In October 2023, a judge declined to stop the law from taking effect.
Nebraska	Governor Jim Pillen	October 2, 2023	October 2, 2023	On October 2, 2023, the state Department of Health and Human Services announced that Republican Governor Jim Pillen had approved emergency regulations banning gender affirming surgeries for minors. Puberty blockers and hormone treatments for minors still remain legal, however applicants must now wait seven days and undergo at least 40 hours of "clinically neutral" therapy before starting them. The new regulations went into effect immediately.
Ohio	State legislature		April 30, 2025	On January 5, 2024, Governor Mike DeWine signed an executive order banning gender-affirming surgeries for minors. Previously, on December 29, 2023, he had vetoed the Saving Adolescents from Experimentation (SAFE) Act (HB68) passed (mostly along party lines) by the Ohio Legislature on December 13 which banned gender-affirming surgeries as well as hormones and puberty blockers for minors. The bill includes exceptions for this kind of care for non-transgender youth, and it allows children who were already receiving gender-affirming care in Ohio to continue their treatment. On January 24, 2024, the legislature overrode DeWine's veto thereby making HB68 law. On April 16, 2024, a judge temporarily blocked the ban from taking effect. On August 6, 2024, a judge overturned the injunction and allowed the law to take effect immediately. On March 18, 2025, the state's 10th District Court of Appeale reversed the judge's decision and reinstated the injunction. On April 30, 2025, the Supreme Court of Ohio ruled 4-3 that the ban could take effect while further court battles play out.
Wyoming	Governor Mark Gordon	March 22, 2024	July 1, 2024	On March 22, 2024, Wyoming Governor Mark Gordon signed a law criminalizing trans health care for minors.
South Carolina	Governor Henry McMaster	May 21, 2024	May 21, 2024	On May 21, 2024, South Carolina Governor Henry McMaster signed a law banning trans health care for minors. The law, which went into effect immediately, also requires principals, teachers and other school staff members to tell parents when their children want to use a name other than their legal one, or pronouns that do not match their sex assigned at birth. It also bars adults under 26 from using Medicaid to cover the costs for trans health care. This part of the bill is in direct opposition to a 4th U.S. Circuit Court of Appeals ruling from the month prior which ruled that state Medicaid bans on gender-affirming care in the 4th Circuit, which includes South Carolina, are unconstitutional.
New Hampshire	Governor Chris Sununu (genital surgeries) Governor Kelly Ayotte (puberty blockers, hormones and other surgeries)	July 19, 2024 (genital surgeries) August 1, 2025 (puberty blockers, hormones and other surgeries)	January 1, 2025 (genital surgeries) January 1, 2026 (puberty blockers, hormones and other surgeries)	On July 19, 2024, New Hampshire Governor Chris Sununu signed a law banning gender-affirming genital surgeries for minors. However, puberty blockers, hormones and non-genital surgeries such as mastectomies remained legal for trans youth. On August 1, 2025, Governor Kelly Ayotte signed a bill ending puberty blockers, hormones and non-genital surgeries for minors in the state too. However, the bill contains an exception which allows minors already receiving care to continue it.
Kansas	State legislature		Blocked	On February 18, 2025, the Kansas state legislature overrode Governor Laura Kelly's veto of Senate Bill 63 which bans gender-affirming care for minors. Children already receiving gender-affirming care in Kansas must stop receiving it by December 31, 2025. On May 17, 2026, Kansas judge issued a temporary injunction against the ban, saying it likely violates the state constitution.
Puerto Rico	Governor Jenniffer González-Colón	July 17, 2025	July 17, 2025	On July 17, 2025, Puerto Rico Governor Jenniffer González-Colón signed Senate Bill 350 which bans on gender-affirming care for anyone under 21 years of age. It also bars public funding for gender-affirming care and threatens doctors who violate the ban with up to 15 years in prison, a $50,000 fine, and the permanent loss of their licenses. Puerto Rico's LGBTQ+ Federation immediately announced plans to challenge the ban in court.

==== Protections for minors ====
"Shield" laws protecting access to gender-affirming healthcare for people under 18
State	Authority	Signed	Effective	Notes
Connecticut	Governor Ned Lamont	May 5, 2022	May 5, 2022	On May 5, 2022, Governor Ned Lamont signed House Bill 5414, a shield law that designates Connecticut as a "safe harbor" which protects people who provide abortions and gender affirming care in the state, as well as legal protections for people seeking abortions and gender-affirming health care from out-of-state.
Massachusetts	Governor Charlie Baker	July 29, 2022	July 29, 2022	On July 29, 2022, Governor Charlie Baker signed a shield law which protects access to abortion and gender-affirming health care in the state.
California	Governor Gavin Newsom	September 30, 2022	January 1, 2023	On September 30, 2022, Governor Gavin Newsom signed SB 107, a shield law which designates California as a "sanctuary state" for trans youth and their families who are fleeing from other states that have banned the practice.
District of Columbia	Mayor Muriel Bowser	November 21, 2022	November 21, 2022	On November 21, 2022, Mayor Muriel Bowser signed into law D.C. ACT 24-646, the Human Rights Sanctuary Amendment Act of 2022, which protects the right to bodily autonomy and of those seeking care for abortion, contraception, sexual conduct, intimate relationships, and gender affirmation.
Illinois	Governor JB Pritzker	January 13, 2023	January 13, 2023	On January 13, 2023, Governor JB Pritzker signed into law HB4664, a reproductive rights and gender affirming care omnibus bill that protects health care providers and their patients from legal attacks by neighboring states and expands reproductive and gender affirming health care access and options across the state. The bill takes historic action to protect Illinois providers and their patients, thousands of whom have traveled to Illinois to access essential care now banned in their home states.
New Mexico	Governor Michelle Lujan Grisham	March 16, 2023	March 16, 2023	On March 16, 2023, Governor Michelle Lujan Grisham signed into law House Bill 7, the Reproductive and Gender-Affirming Health Care Act, which prohibits public bodies, including local municipalities, from denying, restricting, or discriminating against an individual's right to use or refuse reproductive health care or health care related to gender.
Vermont	Governor Phil Scott	March 29, 2023	September 2023	On March 29, 2023, Governor Phil Scott signed into law House Bill 89 and Senate Bill 37, which establish a slate of protections for both providers and seekers of gender affirming health care, as well as those seeking or administering abortions.
New Jersey	Governor Phil Murphy	April 4, 2023	April 4, 2023	On April 4, 2023, Governor Phil Murphy signed Executive Order No. 326 establishing New Jersey as a safe haven for gender-affirming health care by directing all state departments and agencies to protect all persons, including health care professionals and patients, against potential repercussions resulting from providing, receiving, assisting in providing or receiving, seeking, or traveling to New Jersey to obtain gender-affirming health care services.
Colorado	Governor Jared Polis	April 14, 2023	April 14, 2023	On April 14, 2023, Governor Jared Polis signed into law a trio of health care bills enshrining access to abortion and gender-affirming procedures and medications in Colorado. These bills ensure people in surrounding states and beyond can go to Colorado to have an abortion, begin puberty blockers or receive gender-affirming surgery without fear of prosecution.
Minnesota	Governor Tim Walz	April 27, 2023	April 27, 2023	On April 27, 2023, Governor Tim Walz signed a shield law which protects minors fleeing from other states to receive gender-affirming care.
Washington	Governor Jay Inslee	May 9, 2023	May 9, 2023	On May 9, 2023, Governor Jay Inslee signed a shield law designating Washington as a "sanctuary state" for trans youth.
Maryland	Governor Wes Moore	June 6, 2023	June 6, 2023	On June 6, 2023, Governor Wes Moore signed an executive order to protect gender affirming health care in Maryland. The order will protect those seeking, receiving, or providing gender affirming care in Maryland from attempts at legal punishment by other states. The executive order was codified into law by the Trans Shield Act, which Moore signed into law on May 16, 2024.
New York	Governor Kathy Hochul	June 26, 2023	June 26, 2023	On June 26, 2023, Governor Kathy Hochul signed a shield law designating New York as a "sanctuary state" for trans youth. This law protects access to transition-related medical care for transgender minors and bars state courts from enforcing the laws of other states that might authorize a child to be taken away if the parents provide gender-affirming medical care, including puberty blockers and hormone therapy. It also prohibits New York courts from considering transition-related care for minors as child abuse and bars state and local authorities from cooperating with out-of-state agencies regarding the provision of lawful gender-affirming care in New York.
Arizona	Governor Katie Hobbs	June 28, 2023	June 28, 2023	On March 30, 2022, Governor Doug Ducey signed a bill banning gender-affirming surgery for minors, but not hormones and puberty blockers. The bill also makes some exceptions, including in the case of someone born intersex. On June 28, 2023, a new Governor, Katie Hobbs reversed course by signing a series of executive orders which include shield-style protections for gender-affirming care, ensuring that it remains legal in Arizona. It also bans conversion therapy, requires insurance plans to cover gender-affirming care and bars state agencies from cooperating with civil and criminal cases in states where gender-affirming health care is illegal.
Oregon	Governor Tina Kotek	July 13, 2023	July 13, 2023	On May 9, 2023, Governor Tina Kotek signed a law protecting access to abortion and gender affirming care for trans youth. Minors between the ages of 15 and 17 can receive gender affirming care without parental permission, whereas youth ages 14 and under must have parental permission.
Maine	Governor Janet Mills	April 23, 2024	April 23, 2024	On April 23, 2024, Governor Janet Mills signed a shield law designating Maine as a "sanctuary state" for gender-affirming care and abortion providers and makes access to such treatments "legal rights" in Maine. It states that criminal and civil actions against providers and patients are not enforceable if the access to that care occurred in Maine. Additionally, the bill prevents cooperation with out-of-state arrest warrants for gender-affirming care and abortion that happen within the state. It also protects doctors who provide gender-affirming care and abortion from actions by medical boards, malpractice insurance, and other regulating entities that seek to economically harm them or dissuade them from providing care. The bill also explicitly enshrines WPATH's Standards of Care into state law for the coverage of transgender healthcare.
Rhode Island	Governor Daniel McKee	June 25, 2024	June 25, 2024	On June 25, 2024, Governor Daniel McKee signed a shield law designating Rhode Island as a "sanctuary state" for gender-affirming care and abortion providers and makes access to such treatments "legal rights" in Rhode Island. The bill also protects providers from being sued for providing care.
Delaware	Governor Matt Meyer	June 20, 2025	June 20, 2025	On June 20, 2025, Governor Matt Meyer signed Executive Order No. 11 establishing Delaware as a "sanctuary state" for gender-affirming care by protecting patients and providers from bans and restrictions in other states. It also forbids state agencies from giving up "medical records, data or billing information, or utilize state resources that could help any criminal or civil investigation against someone receiving or providing gender-affirming care" and prohibits the state professional regulations board from disbarring healthcare providers because they provide gender-affirming care.
Hawaii	Governor Josh Green	May 29, 2026	July 1, 2026	On May 29, 2026, Governor Josh Green signed House Bill 1875, also known as Act 059, a shield law to explicitly protect providers of gender-affirming care and the patients that receive it. The bill also contains protections against "abusive litigation", bans medical malpractice insurers and health carriers from taking adverse actions against gender-affirming care providers, and clarifies permitted disclosures of protected healthcare information in response to new federal regulations.

=== Bathroom bills ===
A bathroom bill is the common name for legislation or a statute that defines access to public toilets by gender (restrooms)—or transgender individual. Bathroom bills affect access to sex-segregated public facilities for an individual based on a determination of their sex as defined in some specific way—such as their sex as assigned at birth, their sex as listed on their birth certificate, or the sex that corresponds to their gender identity. A bathroom bill can either be inclusive or exclusive of transgender individuals, depending on the aforementioned definition of their sex. Unisex public toilets are one option to overcome this controversy.

Critics of bills which exclude transgender individuals from restrooms which conform to their gender identity argue that they do not make public restrooms any safer for cisgender (non-transgender) people, and that they make public restrooms less safe for both transgender people and gender non-conforming cisgender people. Additionally, critics claim there have been no cases of a transgender person attacking a cisgender person in a public restroom, although there has been at least one isolated incident of voyeurism in a fitting room. By comparison, a much larger percentage of transgender people have been verbally, physically, and sexually harassed or attacked by cisgender people in public facilities. For these reasons the controversy over transgender bathroom access has been labeled a moral panic.

Proponents say such legislation is necessary to maintain privacy, protect what they claim to be an innate sense of modesty held by most cisgender people, prevent voyeurism, assault, molestation, and rape, and retain psychological comfort.

One bathroom bill, the Public Facilities Privacy & Security Act in North Carolina, was approved as a law in 2016, although portions of the measure were later repealed in 2017 as part of a compromise between the Democratic governor and Republican-controlled Legislature.

==== Public opinion ====
Public opinion regarding "transgender bathroom rights" in the United States is mixed, see summary table below.

Date(s) conducted	Support laws that require transgender individuals to use bathrooms that correspond to their birth sex	Oppose laws that require transgender individuals to use bathrooms that correspond to their birth sex	Don't know / NA	Margin of error	Sample	Conducted by	Polling type
February 17, 2023 -March 3, 2023	45%	40%	16%	?	1,000 American adults	Ipsos	Online interviews
June 10, 2019	45%	47%		?	1,100 American adults	Pew Research	Cellphone and landline phones
May 29, 2019 - May 30, 2019	50%	50%		?	1,295 registered voters	Harvard CAPS/Harris Poll	Online interviews
May 3, 2017 – May 7, 2017	48%	45%	7%	4%	1,011 adults American adults	Gallup	Cellphone and landline phones
March 2017	40%	40%		?	?	YouGov	?
February 10, 2017 – February, 19, 2017	39%	53%		2.6%	2,031 adults	Public Religion Research Institute	Live interviews via RDD telephones and cell phones
August 16, 2016 – September 12, 2016, 2016	46%	51%	3%	2.4%	4,538 respondents	Pew Research	Web and mail
May 4, 2016 – May 8, 2016	50%	40%	10%	?	?	Gallup	?
June 3, 2015 – June 4, 2015	46%	41%	12%	4.1%	1,300 unweighted respondents	CBS / NYT	?
April 28, 2016 – May 1, 2016	38%	57%	5%	3%	1,001 adults	CNN / ORC International	Live interviews via landline telephones and cell phones
March 26, 2016 – March 28, 2016	37%	37%	26%	4%	1,000 adult American citizens	YouGov	Online interviews
June 3, 2015 – June 4, 2015	38%	37%	25%	4.1%	994 American adults	Huffington Post / YouGov	?
March 19, 2014 - March 23, 2014	59%	26%		?	1,016 American adults	CBS	land-line and cellphones

=== Trans athletes in sports ===
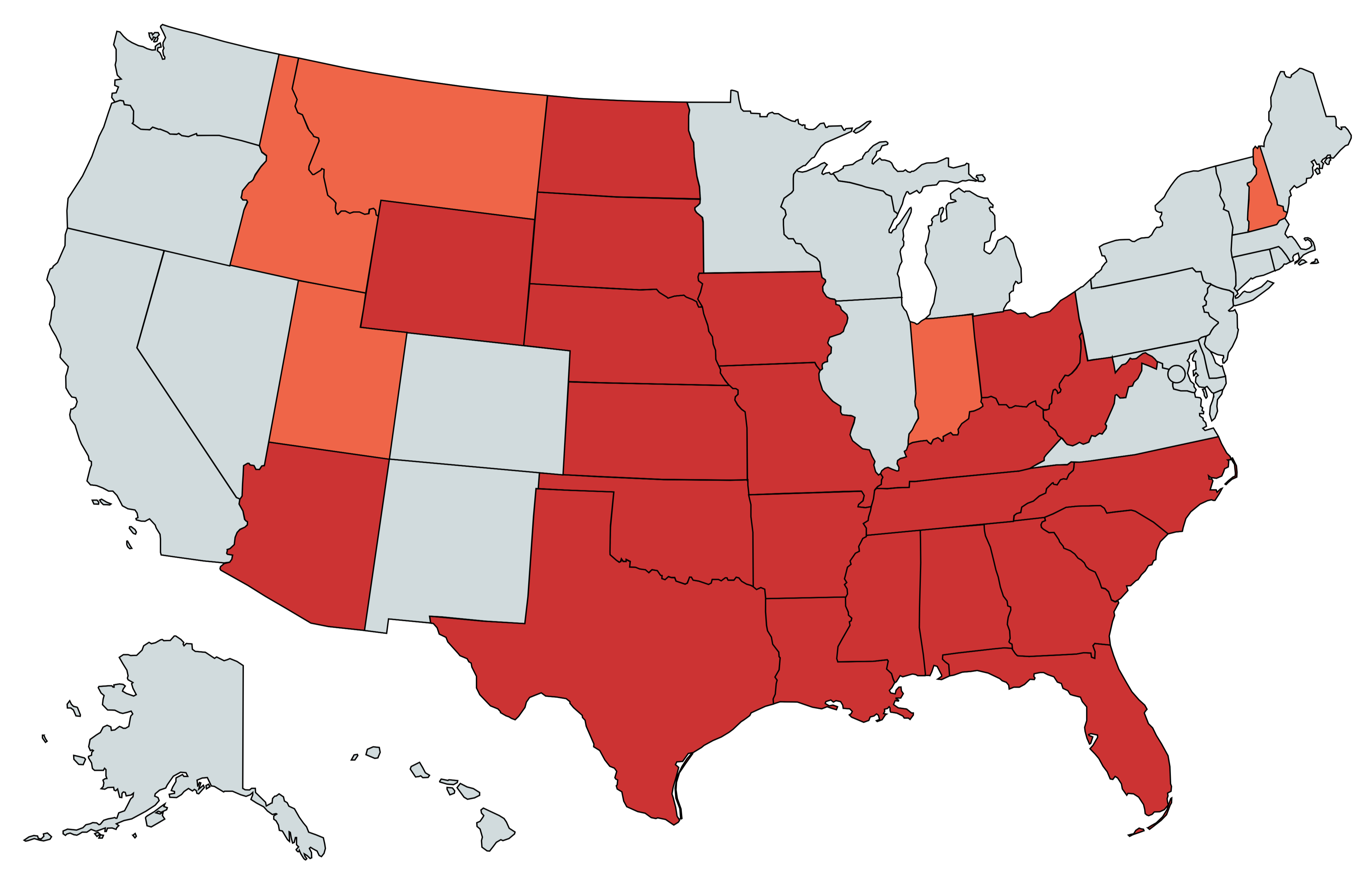
Map of current or proposed state laws which ban transgender athletes from participating in the sport of their gender identity: Law enacted which bans trans athletes from participating in sport under their gender identity; enforces gender classifications in sports based on "original" registered biological sex Law preventing trans athletes from participating in sport in their gender identity enacted, but currently blocked from enforcement via court order

Twenty-seven states have banned transgender people from sports under their gender identity in various capacities. Alabama, Arizona, Arkansas, Florida, Georgia, Idaho, Indiana, Iowa, Kansas, Kentucky, Louisiana, Mississippi, Missouri Montana, Nebraska New Hampshire, North Carolina, North Dakota, Ohio, Oklahoma, South Carolina, South Dakota, Tennessee, Texas, Utah, West Virginia, and Wyoming. The passage of legislation against transgender youth has seen increases in calls to Trans Lifeline, a suicide crisis hotline run by and for transgender people. Some of these bans only apply to school sports and some only apply to transgender women, but not transgender men.

The Human Rights Campaign has argued that these discriminatory laws are not about protecting women's sports, but rather attempt to "undermine the existence of transgender people." Transgender advocates have noted that hormone replacement therapy and testosterone suppression reduce muscle mass and physical strength in transgender women, reducing the possibility of a competitive advantage. A 2021 literature review concluded that for trans women, even with testosterone suppression, "the data show that strength, lean body mass, muscle size and bone density are only trivially affected. The reductions observed in muscle mass, size, and strength are very small compared to the baseline differences between males and females in these variables, and thus, there are major performance and safety implications in sports where these attributes are competitively significant." After 24 months of testosterone suppression, bone mass is generally preserved. The review states that no study has reported muscle loss greater than 12% with testosterone suppression even after three years of hormone therapy. It found that trans women are in the top 10% of females regarding lean body mass and possess a grip 25% stronger than most females. They suggest that instead of universal guidelines, each individual sport federation decide how to "balance between inclusion, safety and fairness" due to differences between sports. Transgender inclusion in sports is supported by the Women's Sports Foundation, the Women's National Basketball Players Association (WNBPA), the National Women's Law Center, and Athlete Ally, as well as United States Women's National Soccer Team Captain Megan Rapinoe, tennis legend Billie Jean King, WNBA Minnesota Lynx coach Cheryl Reeve, and WNBA star Candace Parker.

The United States Department of Education during the Biden Administration has said transgender students are protected under Title IX and during the second Trump administration has said schools allowing transgender participation in girls' sports is a Title IX violation.

=== Transgender people in prison ===
In September 2011, a California state court denied the request of a California inmate, Lyralisa Stevens, for sex reassignment surgery at the state's expense.

On January 17, 2014, in Kosilek v. Spencer a three-judge panel of the First Circuit Court of Appeals ordered the Massachusetts Department of Corrections to provide Michelle Kosilek, a Massachusetts inmate, with sex reassignment surgery. It said denying the surgery violated Kosilek's Eighth Amendment rights, which included "receiving medically necessary treatment ... even if that treatment strikes some as odd or unorthodox".

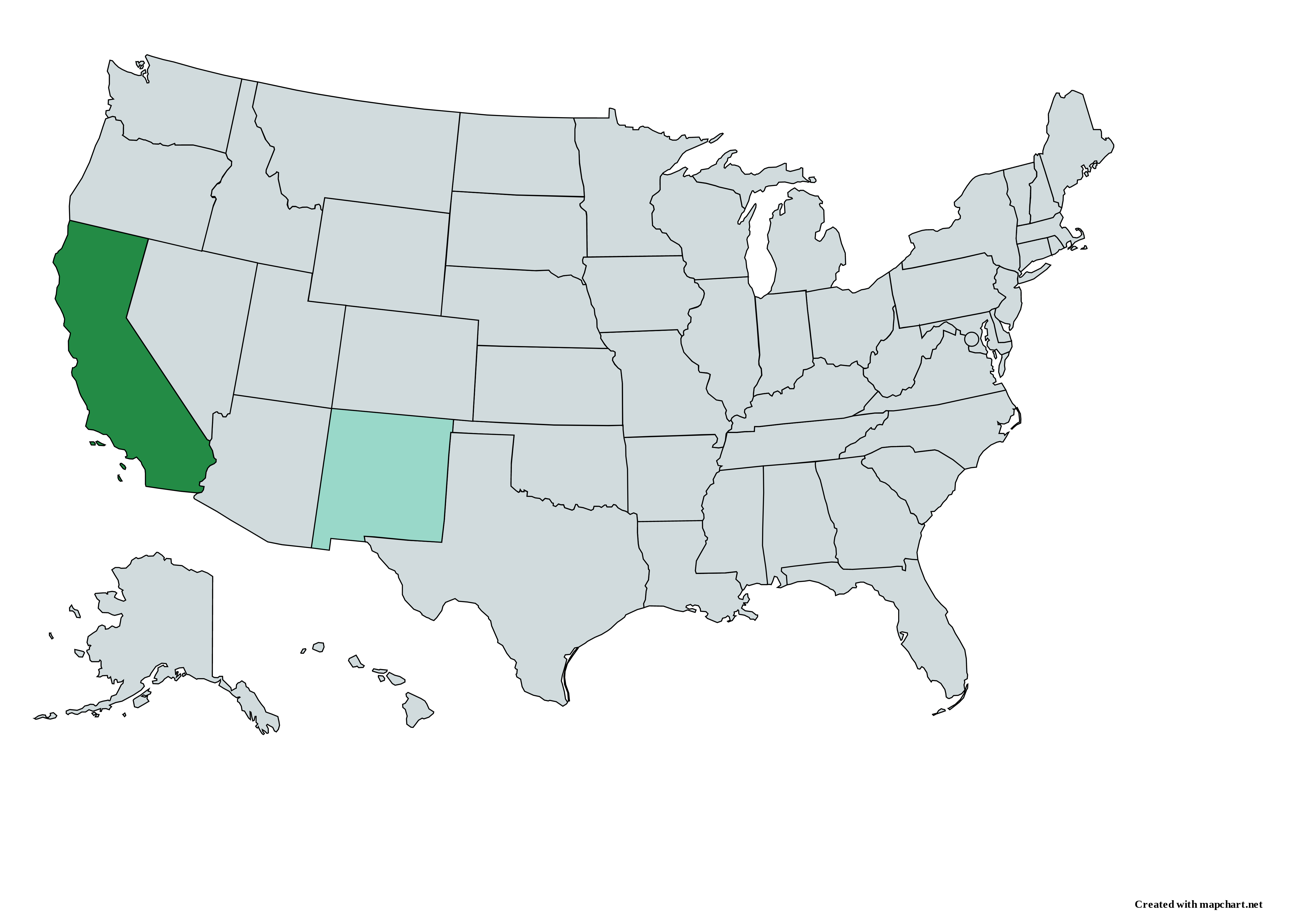
Housing of Transgender Inmates in prisons, juvenile detentions, and jails by state according to statute, court ruling, or policy: Allows transgender inmates to be housed according to their gender identity Allows transgender inmates to be housed in separate facilities apart from other inmates reserved for transgender people only

On April 3, 2015, the U.S. Department of Justice intervened in a federal lawsuit filed in Georgia to argue that denying hormone treatment for transgender inmates violates their rights. It contended that the state's policy that only allows for continuing treatments begun before incarceration was insufficient and that inmate treatment needs to be based on ongoing assessments. The case was brought by Ashley Diamond, an inmate who had used hormone treatment for seventeen years before entering the Georgia prison system.

On May 11, 2018, the US Bureau of Prisons announced that prison guidelines issued by the Obama administration in January 2017 to allow transgender prisoners to be transferred to prisons housing inmates of the gender which they identify with had been rescinded and that assigned sex at birth would once again determine where transgender prisoners are jailed.

As of January 2021, one state, California, allows transgender people to be housed in prison according to their gender identity, and another, New Mexico, has separate facilities entirely, which are segregated off from other inmates, and are reserved for transgender people only.

=== Transgender Day of Remembrance ===
Transgender Day of Remembrance was founded in 1999 by Gwendolyn Ann Smith and JMEL a transgender woman, to memorialize the murder of transgender woman Rita Hester in Allston, Massachusetts. It has slowly evolved from the web-based project started by Smith into an international day of action every November 20. Transgender Day of Remembrance is now a day to honor all transgender lives lost to murder caused by transphobia. Several communities and organizations all over the world have made vigils accessible to all for the lost lives through murder.

== Intersex rights ==
Since April 11, 2022, United States passports have given the sex/gender options of male, female and X by self determination. Intersex people in the United States have some of the same rights as others but with significant gaps, particularly in protection from non-consensual cosmetic medical interventions, violence, and discrimination. Many non-consensual medical surgeries are being performed to align these individuals with a more typically male or female sex when they are babies or children. Some are also put on hormones to ensure that their bodies develop to the sex they were assigned. In August 2018, the California state legislature passed a resolution that condemns these types of surgeries. Actions by intersex civil society organizations aim to eliminate harmful practices and promote social acceptance and equality. In recent years, intersex activists have also secured some legal recognition.

== Medical discrimination ==
=== HIV/AIDS ===
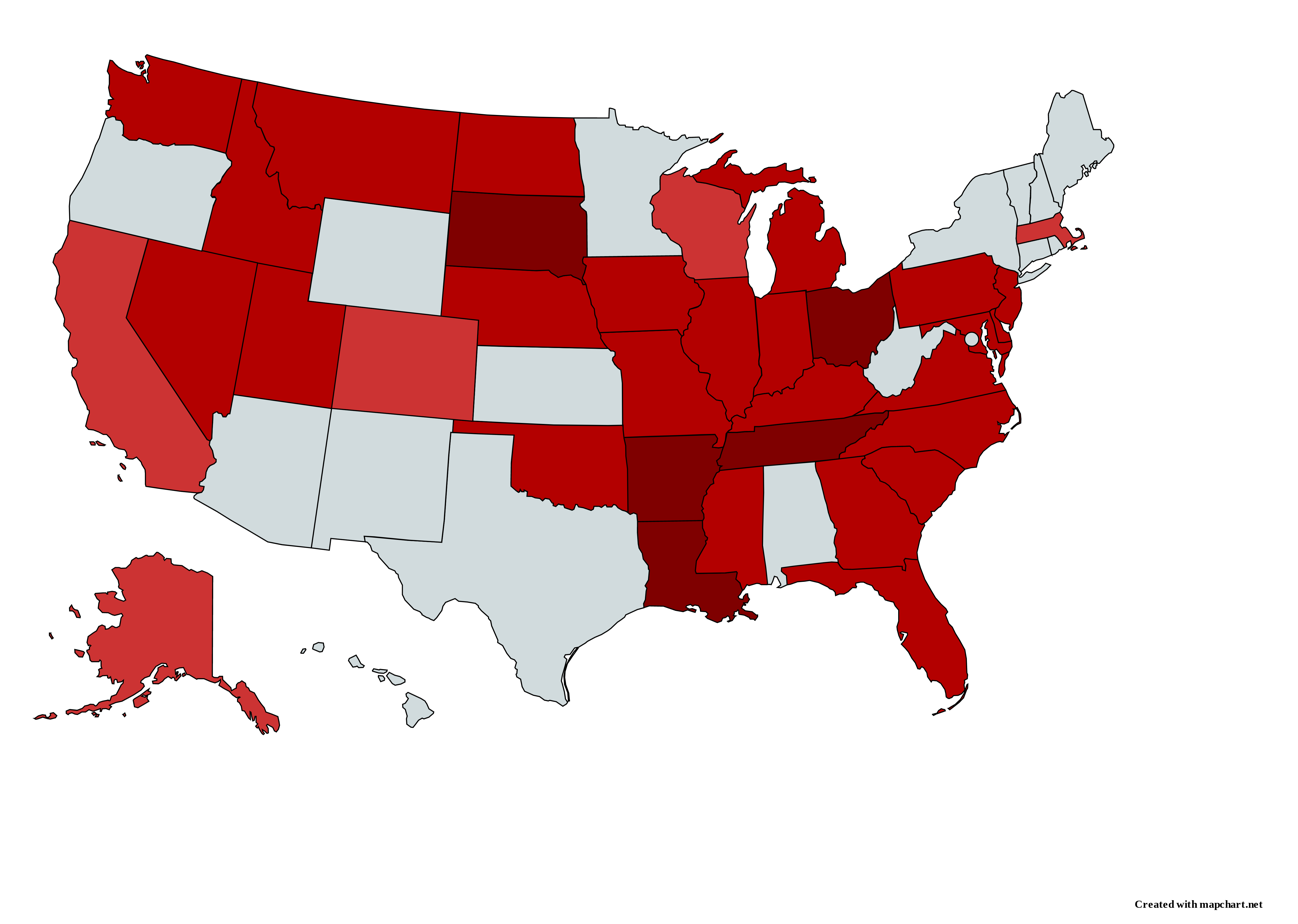
HIV criminalization laws by state: State has HIV criminalization law and may also require sex offender registration for HIV and AIDS exposure State has HIV criminalization law State has no HIV criminalization law, but does have HIV-specific sentencing enhancements for sex-related convictions

In 1981, the AIDS epidemic, caused by the Human Immunodeficiency Virus, was reported in the United States. HIV is transferred through infected blood and sexual contact, and in the early 1980s, risk factors were reported to include homosexuality and drug use. One of the earliest medical clinics treating the disease was run in New York City by Dr. Joseph Sonnabend. By 1985, thousands of people in the United States had died. Many LGBTQ advocacy organizations began to speak up and raise funds.

=== Blood and tissue donation ===
In the United States, the Food and Drug Administration (FDA) issues non-binding guidance for deferral of blood donations, which are universally followed. In May 2023, the restrictions were updated to focus on behavior rather than sexual orientation or gender. People are ineligible to donate blood if they have:

- Had anal sex within the past 3 months and have a new or multiple sexual partners
- Ever tested positive for HIV or been treated for HIV with anti-retroviral therapy
- Taken any HIV prevention medication (PEP or PrEP; these can affect test results) by mouth within the past 3 months or by injection within the past 2 years
- Ever exchanged sex for payment or barter
- Used non-prescription injection drugs within the past 3 months
- Had sex within the past 3 months with someone who has ever tested positive for HIV
- Received an allogeneic blood transfusion or been exposed to blood of another individual (e.g. through a wound) within the past 3 months
- Gotten a tattoo or body piercing within the last 3 months, unless pierced with single-use equipment or tattooed in a state-approved shop with sterile needles and non-reused ink
- Been infected with or treated for syphilis or gonorrhea within the past 3 months
- Hemophilia or other clotting factor deficiency

Current regulations prohibit tissue and semen donation by any man who has had sex with another man in the preceding five years, even if all infectious testing is negative. This five-year MSM deferral policy prevents thousands of donations of eye tissue annually, despite a global shortage of donated eye tissue needed for vision-restoring corneal transplant surgeries.

=== Conversion therapy ===
Conversion therapy is the discredited practice of attempting to change a person's sexual orientation or gender identity. 21 states, the District of Columbia, and Puerto Rico ban the practice of conversion therapy on minors.

== History of U.S. Supreme Court decisions on LGBTQ rights ==
In March 1956, a Federal District Court ruled that ONE: The Homosexual Magazine, was obscene under the Federal Comstock laws and thus could not be sent through the United States Postal Service. This ruling was upheld by the 9th Circuit Court of Appeals, but in 1958, the Supreme Court issued a landmark ruling in One, Inc. v. Olesen, 355 U.S. 371 (1958), which overturned the previous rulings under a new legal precedent that had been established by the landmark case, Roth v. United States, 354 U.S. 476 (1957). As a result, gay newspapers, magazines and other publications could be lawfully distributed through the public mail service. On May 22, 1967, the Supreme Court upheld the Immigration and Nationality Act of 1952 in Boutilier v. Immigration and Naturalization Service 387 U.S. 118 (1967). The Court held that barring homosexuals from entry to the United States was valid and constitutional. This ban remained in effect until 1991 after the passage of the Immigration Act of 1990.

In 1972, a Tacoma, Washington teacher of twelve years with a perfect record was terminated after a former student outed him to the vice-principal. The Washington Supreme Court found that homosexuality was immoral and impaired his efficiency as a teacher. The court supported its conclusion in various ways, including the definition of homosexuality in the New Catholic Encyclopedia, the criminal nature of homosexual conduct, and finding that an "immoral" person could not be trusted to instruct students as his presence would be inherently disruptive. On October 3, 1977, the Supreme Court denied certiorari, although Justices Brennan and Marshall would have granted cert. This was the first homosexual discrimination decision to be aired on national network news. In fact, it was simultaneously aired on all three national network evening news shows, reaching approximately 60 million viewers.

In 1985, the Supreme Court heard Board of Education v. National Gay Task Force, which concerned First and Fourteenth Amendment challenges against a law that allowed schools to fire teachers for public homosexual conduct. The Court affirmed the lower court by an equally divided vote 4–4 allowing the Tenth Circuit's ruling that partially struck down the law to stand without setting precedent.

Also in 1985, the Supreme Court refused to hear an appeal of Gay Student Services v. Texas A&M University, letting stand an appellate ruling ordering the university to provide official recognition of a student organization for homosexual students.

On June 30, 1986, the Supreme Court of the United States ruled in Bowers v. Hardwick, that same-sex intimate conduct was not protected under the right to privacy established under the Fourteenth Amendment.

On May 20, 1996, the Supreme Court of the United States ruled in Romer v. Evans against an amendment to the Colorado state constitution that would have prevented any city, town or county in the state from taking any legislative, executive, or judicial action to protect homosexual or bisexual citizens from discrimination on the basis of their sexual orientation.

On March 4, 1998, the Supreme Court of the United States ruled in Oncale v. Sundowner Offshore Services that federal laws banning on-the-job sexual harassment also applied when both parties are the same sex. The lower courts, however, have reached differing conclusions about whether this ruling applies to harassment motivated by anti-gay animus.

On June 28, 2000, the Supreme Court of the United States ruled in Boy Scouts of America v. Dale that the Boy Scouts of America had a First Amendment right to exclude people from its organization on the basis of sexual orientation, irrespective of any applicable civil rights laws.

On June 26, 2003, the Supreme Court ruled in Lawrence v. Texas that intimate consensual sexual conduct is part of the liberty protected by substantive due process under the Fourteenth Amendment. The majority opinion, written by Justice Anthony Kennedy, explicitly overruled Bowers v. Hardwick, a 1986 decision that found sodomy laws to be constitutional.

Ten years after the Lawrence decision, the Supreme Court ruled on June 26, 2013, by a 5–4 vote in United States v. Windsor that section 3 of the Defense of Marriage Act, that forbade the federal government from recognizing lawfully performed same-sex marriages, was found to violate the Fifth Amendment. The federal government then began to recognize lawfully performed same-sex marriages, and provide federal rights, privileges and benefits.

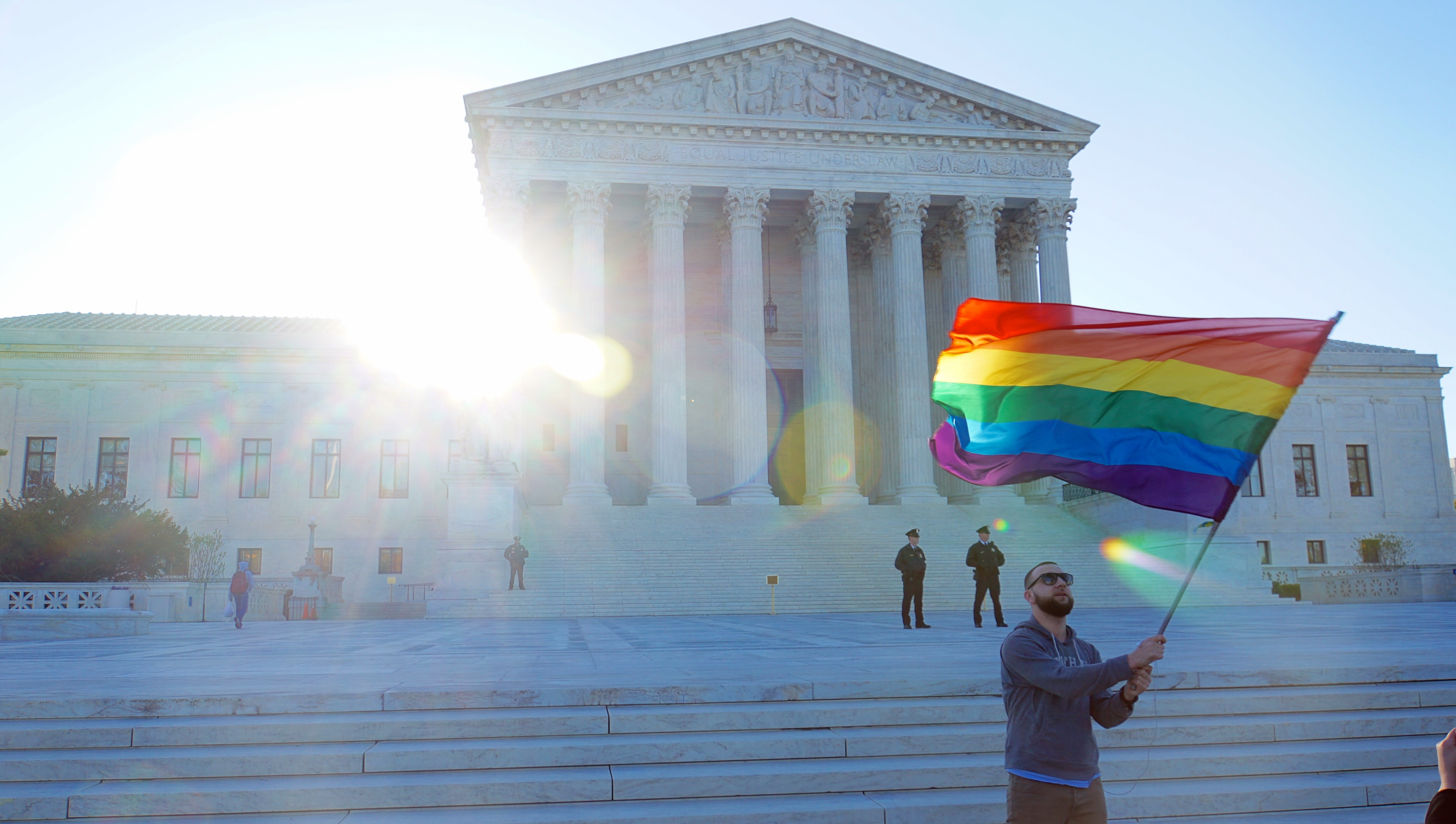
A man waves the rainbow flag outside the Supreme Court during Obergefell v. Hodges

On June 26, 2015, the Supreme Court ruled in Obergefell v. Hodges that same-sex marriage cannot be prohibited by a state. Consequently, same-sex marriages are licensed and recognized as valid and enforced in all states and areas subject to the jurisdiction of the U.S. Constitution.

On June 15, 2020, the Supreme Court of the United States ruled that the protections provided by Title VII of the Civil Rights Act of 1964 are also extended to LGBTQ individuals, thereby making it illegal for workplaces with 15 or more employees to discriminate on the basis of sexuality or gender identity. The three consolidated cases were Altitude Express, Inc. v. Zarda; Bostock v. Clayton County; and R.G. & G.R. Harris Funeral Homes Inc. v. Equal Employment Opportunity Commission. USA Today afterwards stated that in addition to LGBTQ employment discrimination, "The court's ruling is likely to have a sweeping impact on federal civil rights laws barring sex discrimination in education, health care, housing and financial credit."

On June 30, 2023, the Supreme Court ruled by a 6–3 vote in 303 Creative LLC v. Elenis that businesses can refuse to create works that recognize same-sex marriage if it goes against their values, on the basis of the First Amendment's protection of free speech.

On March 31, 2026, the Supreme Court ruled in Chiles v. Salazar, by an 8–1 vote, that the First Amendment prohibits states from using their licensing authority to restrict the topics therapists may discuss with clients, striking down Colorado's ban on conversion therapy for minors.

On June 30, 2026, the Supreme Court ruled in the consolidated cases Little v. Hecox and West Virginia v. B. P. J., holding that the Idaho and West Virginia laws barring transgender girls and women from playing on female school athletic teams do not violate the Equal Protection Clause or Title IX.

== Political support for LGBTQ rights ==
=== Support ===
The main supporters of LGBTQ rights in the U.S. have generally been political liberals and libertarians. Regionally, support for the LGBTQ rights movement has been strongest in the areas of the Northeast and the West Coast, and in other states with large urban populations. The national Democratic Party has held the official platform support most initiatives since 2012 for LGBTQ rights. However, there are some Republican groups advocating for LGBTQ issues inside the party include the Log Cabin Republicans, GOProud, Young Conservatives for the Freedom To Marry, and College Republicans of the University of Pennsylvania and Columbia University. A CNN News poll in 2021 found that 55% of Republicans support same-sex marriage, a percentage that rose to 55% in a Gallup poll conducted during May 2021.

In 2013, 52% of Republicans and GOP-leaning independents between the age of 18 and 49 years old supported same-sex marriage in a joint Washington Post-ABC News poll. A 2014 Pew Forum Poll showed that American Muslims are more likely than Evangelicals to support same-sex marriage 42% to 28%, a percentage that according to the Public Religion Research Institute in 2018 rose to 51% and 34%. According to Pew Research Center in 2017, Millennials and Generation X, younger white evangelicals born after 1964, have grown more supportive in favor same-sex marriage, up to 47%. A 2017 Pew Research Center poll showed that 64% of White Americans, 60% of Hispanic and Latino Americans and 51% of African Americans support the right for same-sex couples to marry. Religious groups in support of their LGBTQ parishioners and same-sex marriage include the Episcopal Church, the Evangelical Lutheran Church in America, the Metropolitan Community Church, the Union for Reform Judaism, the Moravian Church, the Christian Church (Disciples of Christ), the Alliance of Baptists, the Baptist Joint Committee for Religious Liberty, the Reformed Church in America, the United Church of Christ, the Presbyterian Church (USA), and the United Methodist Church.

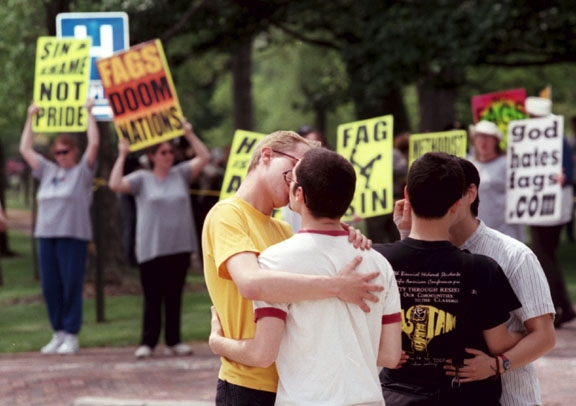
Students kissing in front of protesters from Westboro Baptist Church at Oberlin College in Ohio

=== Opposition ===
While support for same-sex marriage has increased significantly since the Obergefell decision, support has fallen slightly since its peak in 2023. Democratic and independent support has remained largely stable, while Republican support fell from its peak at 55% in 2021 to 41% in 2025.

The main opponents of LGBTQ rights in the U.S. have generally been conservative Christians. As of 2024, the majority (62%) of evangelical Protestants oppose same-sex marriage. While evangelical support is the lowest among any religious group, it has increased from 28% in 2014 to 36% in 2024. Arguments against LGBTQ rights are largely based on religious objections. Regionally, LGBTQ rights opposition has been strongest in the South and in other states with a large rural and conservative population, particularly the Bible Belt.

Late in 1979, a new religious revival among conservative evangelical Protestants and Roman Catholics ushered in the conservatism politically aligned with the Christian right that would reign in the United States during the 1980s, becoming another obstacle for the progress of the LGBTQ rights movement. During the HIV/AIDS epidemic of the 1980s, LGBTQ communities were further stigmatized as they became the focus of mass hysteria, suffered isolation and marginalization, and were targeted with extreme acts of violence. As the movement for same-sex marriage has developed, many national and/or international organizations have opposed that movement. Those organizations include the American Family Association, the Christian Coalition, Family Research Council, Focus on the Family, Save Our Children, NARTH, the Catholic Church, The Church of Jesus Christ of Latter-day Saints (LDS Church), the Southern Baptist Convention, Alliance for Marriage, Alliance Defending Freedom, Liberty Counsel, and the National Organization for Marriage.

=== Democratic Party ===
The Democratic Party started to support some LGBTQ rights in the 1970s. Despite signing the Defense of Marriage Act, Bill Clinton was the first president who openly supported LGBTQ rights; he appointed several openly gay government officials during his administration. In the 2012 national platform, the Democratic Party supported the repeal of the Defense of Marriage Act and "equal responsibility, benefits, and protections" for same-sex couples; President Barack Obama came out in support of same-sex marriage in 2012. The Democratic Party explicitly supports same-sex marriage.

In the Democratic Party's 2016 national platform, the Democratic Party adopted its most progressive agenda in supporting LGBTQ rights. According to that agenda, "Democrats believe that LGBT rights are human rights and that American foreign policy should advance the ability of all persons to live with dignity, security, and respect, regardless of who they are or who they love."

The agenda is supportive of:

- Obergefell v. Hodges
- Passing the Equality Act, the comprehensive federal nondiscrimination legislation for LGBTQ Americans in housing, employment, public accommodations, credit, jury service, education, and federal funding
- Including LGBTQ people under sex discrimination laws
- Combating youth homelessness
- Policies to improve school climates for LGBTQ students
- LGBTQ elders
- Access to Transgender health care
- Ending violence against LGBTQ people including the crisis of anti-transgender violence
- Mental health
- "Insuring fair treatment for LGBTQ veterans, including by proactively reviewing and upgrading discharge records for veterans who were discharged because of their sexual orientation."

The agenda opposes:

- Anti-LGBTQ state laws including anti-transgender legislation

In the section on HIV/AIDS:

Democrats believe an AIDS-free generation is within our grasp. But today far too many Americans living with HIV are without access to quality care and too many new infections occur each year. That is why we will implement the National HIV and AIDS Strategy; increase research funding for the National Institutes of Health; cap pharmaceutical expenses for people living with HIV and AIDS; reform HIV criminalization laws; and expand access for harm reduction programs and HIV prevention medications, particularly for the populations most at risk of infection. Abroad, we will continue our commitment to the President's Emergency Plan for AIDS Relief and increase global funding for HIV and AIDS prevention and treatment. Democrats will always protect those living with HIV and AIDS from stigma and discrimination."

Pete Buttigieg's run for the 2020 Democratic nomination for President made him America's first openly gay Democratic presidential candidate.

=== Republican Party ===
While many in the Republican Party have become more supportive of same-sex marriage throughout recent years, many are still opposed to the recognition of transgender rights within the United States. More than half of those who identify as Republican believe that same-sex marriage should be legal (55% in a Pew Research survey conducted in May 2021).

Republican presidential nominee Donald Trump used the acronym "LGBT" at the 2016 Republican National Convention while acknowledging the recent shooting at the Pulse nightclub. Trump, as president, signed a memo in August 2017 prohibiting transgender individuals from joining the armed services in most cases. Trump appointed the first openly gay member of Cabinet, Richard Grenell. The Republican Party's 2016 platform, which was also used in 2020, opposes:

- Obergefell v. Hodges (the U.S. Supreme Court case that legalized same-sex marriage) and same-sex marriage generally.
- Banning conversion therapy on minors.
- Transgender children's right to use the facilities corresponding to their gender.
- Covering LGBTQ people under anti-discrimination policies, including in cases of adoption.

Fred Karger's run for the 2012 Republican nomination for President made him America's first openly gay Republican presidential candidate.

In the 2020s, Republican-led states across the United States began rolling back some LGBTQ rights, particularly those involving children and transgender rights. These mainly include bans on gender transitions for minors, bans on public performances of drag shows, among others.

=== Third parties ===
The Libertarian Party has endorsed libertarian perspectives on LGBTQ rights by supporting the decriminalization of same-sex sodomy and promoting same-sex marriage since it was created in 1971, while also supporting religious freedom. The Libertarian Party wished to lift the bans on same-sex marriage, but with the ultimate goal of marriage privatization. Multiple sources, including the Libertarian Party, have referred to John Hospers, who was in 1972 the first presidential nominee of the newly formed Libertarian Party, as the first openly gay person to run for president of the United States. However, The Guardian's obituary stated that his family "strenuously denied" he was gay. Chase Oliver, who is openly gay, became the Libertarian Party's presidential nominee in 2024.

While many American socialist and communist political parties initially preferred to ignore the issue, most now support gay rights causes. Socialist groups generally integrate a stronger approach to gender identity issues than mainstream parties. The Socialist Party U.S.A nominated an openly gay man, David McReynolds, as its first openly gay presidential candidate in 1980; he is America's first gay presidential candidate if not counting John Hospers; see above for the controversy regarding Hospers' sexual orientation. The Green Party has been in favor of sweeping LGBTQ rights and protections since the party's inaugural platform in 2000. The more informal coalition of State Green Parties that existed in America from 1983 to 2000 also backed LGBTQ rights. The Constitution Party (United States) is strongly opposed to LGBTQ freedoms and supports criminal laws against homosexuality and cross-dressing. The party is very conservative and has ties to Christian Reconstructionism, a far-right, political movement within conservative Christian churches.

== Public opinion on different issues ==
Public opinion regarding different individual LGBTQ rights and issues in the United States is very mixed, with some issues having strong majority public opinion on the Progressive side of the argument, where on others, the American population is more Conservative, see summary table below.

LGBTQ right or issue	Support	Oppose	Don't know / NA	Margin of error	Sample	Conducted by	Polling type	Date Conducted
Same-Sex Marriage	68%	29%	3%	?	1,003 American adults	Gallup	Online interviews	May 1, 2025 - May 18, 2025
Same-Sex Couples’ Right to Adopt	64%	26%	10%	?	1,000 American adults	Ipsos	Online interviews	February 17, 2023 - March 3, 2023
Same-Sex Couples’ Parenting	66%	23%	11%	?	1,000 American adults	Ipsos	Online interviews	February 17, 2023 - March 3, 2023
Transgender children's access to transgender health care	45%	42%	14%	?	1,000 American adults	Ipsos	Online interviews	February 17, 2023 - March 3, 2023
Views on Other-Gender Option on Official Documents	41%	43%	16%	?	1,000 American adults	Ipsos	Online interviews	February 17, 2023 - March 3, 2023
Homosexual relations legal	79%	18%	3%	?	?	Gallup	Landline and Cellphone	May 3, 2021 - May 18, 2021
Morality of Changing one's Gender	46%	51%	2%	<0.5%	?	Gallup	Landline and Cellphone	May 3, 2021 - May 18, 2021
Anti-discrimination laws in employment	92%	6%	2%	?	About 1,000 registered voters	Quinnipiac	Landline and Cellphone	May 2, 2019
Trans women serving time in women's prisons	30%	40%	31%	3%	2,000 American adults	YouGov	Online surveys	Two periods: January 22, 2024 - January 27, 2024 and January 23, 2024 - January 26, 2024
Trans people using bathrooms that do not match their sex assigned at birth	26%	49%	25%	1.6%	5,097 American adults	Pew Research Center	Online and telephone	February 10, 2025 - February 17, 2025
Trans people participating in sports that do not match their sex assigned at birth	19%	66%	15%	1.6%	5,097 American adults	Pew Research Center	Online and telephone	February 10, 2025 - February 17, 2025
Teaching LGBTQ subjects in history and school	46%	33%	22%	?	3,721 American adults	YouGov	Online survey	May 28, 2019 - May 31, 2019
Teaching same-sex sexual health	65%	21%	14%	?	3,721 American adults	YouGov	Online survey	May 28, 2019 - May 31, 2019
Same-sex Marriage	70%	29%	1%	?	1,028 American adults	Gallup	Landline and Cellphone	May 3, 2021 - May 18, 2021
Same-sex couples adopting	55%	32%	13%	?	1,224 American adults	YouGov	Online Survey	June 15, 2018 - June 19, 2018
Gays and Lesbians serving openly in the military	60%	30%	10%	?	3,003 American adults	Pew Research	Landline and Cellphone	July 21, 2010 - August 5, 2010
Transgender people serving openly in the military	49%	34%	17%	?	?	YouGov	Online Survey	March 25, 2018 - March 27, 2018
Legal recognition of a non-binary gender	42%	56%	1%	1.5%	10,682 American adults	Pew Research	Online Interviews	September 24, 2018 - October 7, 2018
MSMs donating blood without deferral	34%	51%	15%	?	5,369 American adults	YouGov	Online Survey	March 25, 2020

== Summary table of LGBTQ rights in the United States ==
A denotes that the right exists, while a denotes it does not; a and in the same column means the right varies on a state-by-state basis, or that it varies on the Federal Level.

LGBTQ right	Federal protection	State-level protection
Same-sex sexual activity legal	Yes (under Lawrence v. Texas, 2003)	Yes
Equal age of consent	Yes	Yes
Romeo and Juliet laws apply equally to same-sex couples as to opposite-sex couples	Yes	Yes / Yes
Anti-discrimination laws in employment	Yes	Yes / Yes
Anti-discrimination laws in housing	Yes / Yes (HUD, a federal agency, changed its interpretation of the Fair Housing Act to prohibit discrimination on the basis of sexual orientation or gender identity. However no law has been passed by congress (or reinterpreted by the supreme court) to ban discrimination on the basis of sexual orientation or gender identity in housing.)	Yes / No
Anti-discrimination laws in public accommodations	Yes	Yes / Yes
Anti-discrimination laws in the provision of goods and services	Yes	Yes / No
Anti-discrimination laws in all other areas	Yes	Yes / Yes
Anti-discrimination laws in health insurance	Yes	Yes / Yes
Anti-bullying legislation in schools and colleges	Yes	Yes / Yes
Anti-discrimination laws in schools and colleges	Yes	Yes / Yes
Anti-discrimination laws in hospitals	Yes	Yes
Anti-discrimination law in homeless shelters	Yes	Yes / Yes
Discrimination against Intersex or non-binary persons is interpreted to be a violation of anti-discrimination laws when gender identity and/or sex is enumerated as a protected class	Yes for non-binary people; Yes for Intersex people	Yes / Yes
LGBTQ anti-discrimination law in prisons, juvenile halls, and immigration detention centers, including but not limited to transgender people required to be housed according to their gender identity and coverage of transition care	Yes	Yes / Yes
Transgender-disenfranchising voting laws repealed/absent		Yes / Yes
Transgender people allowed to use restrooms and other gender-segregated spaces that correspond to their gender identity		Yes / Yes
Transgender people allowed to participate in the sport of their gender identity	Yes	Yes / Yes
Single-person restrooms with gender-segregated signage (and a lock) are given new signs saying "All-Gender Restroom" (by policy/law)	Yes	Yes / No (Five states have enacted laws that mandate all single-user gender-segregated bathrooms be unisex)
Gender confirmation surgery, puberty blockers, hormone replacement therapy and other transition-related healthcare for transgender people required to be covered under health insurance and state Medicaid policies	No	Yes / No / (Some states ban coverage of such medical practices, while others require coverage of it, and others are ambiguous on the issue)
LGBTQ education	No	Yes / No (Mixed policies: Multiple states have Anti-LGBTQ curriculum laws in place that limit instruction and discussion of LGBTQ issues in the classroom, while others, such as California, Oregon, Colorado, Illinois, and New Jersey mandate education on LGBTQ issues in school)
Hate Crime laws inclusive of Sexual orientation	Yes (Since 2009 under the Matthew Shepard and James Byrd Jr. Hate Crimes Prevention Act)	Yes / No (35 states enhance sentences for crimes committed against someone on the basis of their sexual orientation, while one state, Michigan, accounts for Hate Crimes committed on the basis of sexual orientation when collecting data on Hate Crimes)
Hate Crime laws inclusive of Gender identity	Yes (Since 2009 under the Matthew Shepard and James Byrd Jr. Hate Crimes Prevention Act)	Yes / No (24 states enhance sentences for crimes committed against some on the basis of them being Transgender or gender non-conforming)
Ban on police profiling on the basis of both perceived and/or actual gender expression, gender identity, and sexual orientation	No	Yes / No
Sexual orientation allowed as grounds for asylum	Yes (Since 1994)	Yes
Gender identity allowed as grounds for asylum	No	No / Yes
Prohibition on the detention of immigrants on the basis of their LGBTQ identity.	No	No / Yes
Prohibition of deportations of LGBTQ immigrants back to countries with the death penalty for homosexuality	No	
Endorsable visas for immigrants and travelers who are legally recognized as non-binary or Intersex in their country of origin (Note: or gender-diverse, X, third-gender, indeterminate, other, T, Hijra, and other legal genders not represented as "male" or "female" from other countries)	No	Yes / No
Surrogacy legal for male same-sex couples		Yes / No
Same-sex marriage	Yes Since 2015 nationwide; No American Samoa, Navajo Nation and several other reservations	Yes
Recognition of same-sex couples	Yes; No Navajo Nation and several other reservations	Yes
Step-child adoption by same-sex couples	Yes; No American Samoa, Navajo Nation and several other reservations	Yes
Joint adoption by same-sex couples	Yes; No American Samoa, Navajo Nation and several other reservations	Yes
Paid family leave for same-sex parents and couples		Yes / No
LGBTQ anti-discrimination law in adoption, custody, and visitation rights		Yes / No
Conjugal visits for same-sex couples	N/A (conjugal visits banned in federal prisons regardless of sexual orientation)	Yes / No (only in New York and California)
LGBTQ people allowed to serve openly in the military	Yes (since 2011)	Yes
Transgender people allowed to serve openly in the military	Yes (Banned since 2025)	Yes
Intersex people allowed to serve openly in the military	No (current Department of Defense policy bans "hermaphrodites" from serving or enlisting in the military)	
Right to change legal gender	Yes (Does not require SRS for a gender change on passports or Social Security's records)	Yes / No (20 states allow a gender change on birth certificates after SRS, 27 states allow it without being required to undergo such treatments, one state bans all amendments to birth certificates, and two are ambiguous at the moment)
Legal recognition of non-binary gender	No	Yes / No
Legal recognition of non-binary gender on US passports	Yes (since 2022)	No
Abolition of gender-based dress codes which may discriminate against transgender students at schools	No	No / Yes / (Known cities with such a policy include New York City)
Airport security screening gender neutral (body scanning, etc.)	Yes (since 2022) Cessation of "alarm" or "anomaly" security flags on bodily characteristics deemed not congruent, or not to "match" sex designations, as may occur for some transgender persons	No
United States census counts number of lesbian, gay, bisexual, and transgender people and recognizes a non-binary gender or Intersex option	No	No
Intersex minors protected from invasive surgical procedures	No	No
Conversion therapy banned on minors	No	Yes / No
Gay panic and trans panic defenses banned by law	No	Yes / No (20 States and Washington D.C. currently ban it.)
Gay and Lesbian Criminal records expunged	No	Yes / No
Homosexuality declassified as a mental illness	Yes (since 1973)	Yes
Transgender identity declassified as a mental illness	Yes (since 1994) Not considered a mental illness. (Note: Diagnosis of "gender dysphoria" in accordance with DSM-5 (2013), is made only if there is "clinically significant distress or impairment in social, occupational, or other important areas of functioning", the American Psychiatric Association advises. The DSM-IV (1994) listed "gender identity disorder" with simlilar clinical criteria. Between 1980 and 1994, "transsexualism" was listed as a mental disorder by the DSM-III, without any criteria of "distress" or "impaired function" (in effect, classifying transgender identity itself as a mental disorder).)	N/A
Intersex sex characteristics declassified as a physical deformity		Yes / No
MSMs allowed to donate blood	Yes	Yes
Female sex partners of MSMs allowed to donate blood	Yes / No (3-month deferral period)	N/A

== Summary of state protections ==
Employment protections will not be included on the following table, unless the state adopted them before 2020, as they have already been implemented nationwide under Bostock v. Clayton County.

State Protections in Housing and Public Accommodations	Sexual orientation	Gender identity/Expression
Alabama	No	No
Alaska	No	No
Arizona	No	No
Arkansas	No (LGBTQ Anti-Discrimination Ordinances covering public accommodations and housing are forbidden in Arkansas under the Intrastate Commerce Improvement Act signed in 2015)	No (LGBTQ Anti-Discrimination Ordinances covering public accommodations and housing are forbidden in Arkansas under the Intrastate Commerce Improvement Act signed in 2015)
California	Yes (Since 1992 in employment, since 2000 in housing, and since 2005 in public accommodations)	Yes (Since 2003 in employment and housing, and since 2005 in public accommodations)
Colorado	Yes (Since 2008 for sexual orientation and gender identity)	Yes (Since 2008 for sexual orientation and gender identity)
Connecticut	Yes (Since 1991)	Yes (Since 2011)
Delaware	Yes (Since 2009)	Yes (Since 2013)
Florida	(States Civil Rights Commission Implicitly Includes sexuality, but not state law)	(States Civil Rights Commission Implicitly Includes gender identity, but not state law)
Georgia	No	No
Hawaii	Yes (Since 1991 for employment, since 2005 in housing, and since 2006 in public accommodations)	Yes (Since 2005 in housing, since 2006 in public accommodations, and since 2011 in employment)
Idaho	No	No
Illinois	Yes (Since 2006 for both sexuality and gender identity)	Yes (Since 2006 for both sexuality and gender identity)
Indiana	No	No
Iowa	Yes (Since 2007 for sexuality)	No (Since 2007 ended 2025 for gender identity with the Iowa General Assembly repealing the clause from the state’s Civil Rights Act)
Kansas	(States Civil Rights Commission implicitly includes sexuality, but not state law)	(States Civil Rights Commission implicitly includes gender identity, but not state law)
Kentucky	No	No
Louisiana	No	No
Maine	Yes (Since 2005 for both sexuality and gender identity)	Yes (Since 2005 for both sexuality and gender identity)
Maryland	Yes (Since 2001)	Yes (Since 2014)
Massachusetts	Yes (Since 1989)	Yes (Since 2016)
Michigan	Yes (Since 2019 for both sexuality and gender identity)	Yes (Since 2019 for both sexuality and gender identity)
Minnesota	Yes (Since 1993 for both sexuality and gender identity)	Yes (Since 1993 for both sexuality and gender identity)
Mississippi	No	No
Missouri	No	No
Montana	No	No
Nebraska	/ No (States Civil Rights Commission implicitly includes sexuality in housing protections, but not state law, and there are no protections in public accommodations)	/ No (States Civil Rights Commission implicitly includes gender identity in housing protections, but not state law, and there are no protections in public accommodations)
Nevada	Yes (Since 1999 in employment, and since 2011 in all other areas)	Yes (Since 2011 in all areas)
New Hampshire	Yes (Since 1998)	Yes (Since 2019)
New Jersey	Yes (Since 1991)	Yes (Since 2006)
New Mexico	Yes (Since 2003 for both sexuality and gender identity)	Yes (Since 2003 for both sexuality and gender identity)
New York	Yes (Since 2003)	Yes (Since 2019)
North Carolina	No	No
North Dakota	No	No
Ohio	No	No
Oklahoma	No	No
Oregon	Yes (Since 2008 for both sexuality and gender identity)	Yes (Since 2008 for both sexuality and gender identity)
Pennsylvania	(States Civil Rights Commission implicitly includes sexuality since 2019, but not state law)	(States Civil Rights Commission implicitly includes gender identity 2019, but not state law)
Rhode Island	Yes (Since 1995)	Yes (Since 2011)
South Carolina	No	No
South Dakota	No	No
Tennessee	No (LGBTQ Anti-discrimination ordinances covering public accommodations and housing are forbidden in Tennessee under the Equal Access to Intrastate Commerce Act signed in 2011)	No (LGBTQ Anti-discrimination ordinances covering public accommodations and housing are forbidden in Tennessee under the Equal Access to Intrastate Commerce Act signed in 2011)
Texas	No	No
Utah	Yes / No (Discrimination on the basis of sexuality prohibited in only housing, and not public accommodations)	Yes / No (Discrimination on the basis of gender identity prohibited in only housing, and not public accommodations)
Vermont	Yes (Since 1992)	Yes (Since 2007)
Virginia	Yes (Since 2020 for both sexuality and gender identity)	Yes (Since 2020 for both sexuality and gender identity)
Washington	Yes (Since 2006 for both sexuality and gender identity)	Yes (Since 2006 for both sexuality and gender identity)
West Virginia	No	No
Wisconsin	Yes (Since 1982)	No
Wyoming	No	No

== See also ==
=== United States topics ===
- Human rights in the United States
- List of LGBTQ members of the United States Congress
- LGBTQ people in the United States
- LGBTQ retirement issues in the United States
- Proposed bans of LGBTQ-themed books in the United States
- Transphobia in the United States

=== LGBTQ history topics ===
- Bisexuality in the United States
- History of bisexuality
- History of gay men in the United States
- History of lesbianism in the United States
- History of LGBTQ rights under U.S. presidents
- Transgender history in the United States
