= List of LGBTQ military and veteran organizations =

The following is a list of existing and defunct organizations concerned with the advancement of lesbian, gay, bisexual or transgender servicemembers and veterans of national armed forces.

== Australia ==
- Defence Force Lesbian Gay Bisexual Transgender and Intersex Information Service (DEFGLIS)

== Canada ==
- LGBT Purge Fund
- Rainbow Veterans Canada

== Netherlands ==
- Pink Army
- Stichting Homosexualiteit en Krijgsmacht (Foundation Homosexuality and Armed Forces)

== Ukraine ==
- LGBT+ Military – founded by openly gay soldier Viktor Pylypenko in 2018.

== United Kingdom ==
- Army LGBT+ Network
- Fighting With Pride

== United States ==
- American Military Partner Association (formerly known as Campaign for Military Partners) merged with Outserve and is now Modern Military Association of America (MMAA)
- American Veterans for Equal Rights (formerly known as Gay, Lesbian & Bisexual Veterans of America)
- Blue Alliance
- Knights Out
- Modern Military Association of America (The American Military Partner Association and OutServe-SLDN merged in 2019 to form this new organization)
- OutServe-SLDNmerged with American Military Partner Association to make Modern Military Association of American
- USNA Out
- Veterans Benevolent Association (defunct)
- Transgender American Veterans Association

== See also ==
- The Queer Insurrection and Liberation Army
- Sacred Band of Thebes
