= LGBTQ rights in American Samoa =

- American Samoa (USA)
- Legal status: Legal since 1980
- Gender identity: Transgender people allowed to change gender
- Discrimination protections: None

Family rights
- Recognition of relationships: Recognizes legal same-sex marriages from other jurisdictions since 13 December 2022
- Adoption: No

Lesbian, gay, bisexual, transgender and queer (LGBTQ) people in American Samoa face legal challenges not experienced by non-LGBTQ residents. Same-sex sexual activity became legal in the territory in 1980, but same-sex couples may not marry. Same-sex couples married legally in other jurisdictions are recognized and must be treated equally under US federal law since 13 December 2022. American Samoa remains the only part of the United States along with select Native American tribal jurisdictions to enforce a ban on same-sex couples marrying.

== History ==
American Samoa, much like Samoa and the rest of Polynesia, used to be tolerant of same-sex relationships and transgender people before the arrival of European explorers who spread heterosexual ideals found in the Torah, laws of morality often followed within Christianity.

Prejudices towards homosexuality did not exist before the arrival of Christian missionaries in the late 18th and early 19th century. Samoan pre-colonial society, similar to other Polynesian societies, was a very "sexually free" culture. Same-sex marriage ceremonies are known to have occurred. Fa'afafine, a cultural third gender in Samoa, could traditionally marry either men or women, and even father children. This isn't so much the case in contemporary times, with reportedly very few fa'afafine opting to marry.

== Law regarding same-sex sexual activity ==
The first criminal law against sodomy was enacted in 1963. The law made male homosexual and heterosexual sodomy illegal, but did not address lesbian sex.

In 1979, the Fono revised criminal law so that consensual sodomy was no longer illegal, unless it involved public acts, prostitution, minors or people unable to give consent due to mental illness. The law took effect in 1980. The age of consent is set at 16 years, regardless of gender and/or sexual orientation.

== Recognition of same-sex relationships ==
The American Samoa Code does not specify the sex of the parties to a marriage, but refers to the age of "the male" and "the female". It prescribes the use of a form in which the parties identify the parents to whom they are related as "son" and as "daughter".

Representative Sua Carl Schuster introduced legislation to ban same-sex marriage in 2003. He said he hoped to establish the territory's position clearly in order to avoid lawsuits like those in the mainland United States. Many supporters of the bill cited their Christian faith as their reason for supporting his proposal. The House Judiciary Committee voted against it and then the full Senate did as well.

It is uncertain how Obergefell v. Hodges may apply to American Samoa as its citizens are U.S. nationals by birth and not citizens. In July 2015, Attorney General Talauega Eleasalo Ale said that his office was "reviewing the decision to determine its applicability to American Samoa." A week later, Governor Lolo Matalasi Moliga stated he believed that the Supreme Court's same-sex marriage ruling does not apply to American Samoa. He said, "My personal opinion is, this ruling will not apply to our preamble, our constitution and our Christian values. Also, our political status is still unorganized and unincorporated, so the Supreme Court ruling does not apply to our territory." His stance was backed by the Assemblies of God, the Catholic Church, and the Church of Jesus Christ of Latter-day Saints. Senator Tuaolo Manaia Fruean believes that the ruling does apply.

Professor Rose Cuison Villazor at the University of California, Davis law school said that the court's same-sex marriage ruling "should not be questioned" in American Samoa, and that "the Supreme Court's decision was pretty strong. ... I would think there are cultural barriers to begin with. The AG might present some other legal and social barriers, too." Omar Gonzales-Pagan of Lambda Legal argued the territories are required to comply due to the supremacy of federal law, and that same-sex marriage "... is a question of individual right, individual liberty." Chimene Keitner, an expert on territorial issues at the University of California, Hastings College of the Law, said that for same-sex marriage to be recognized in American Samoa, there needs to be a voluntary decision or litigation. Litigation would require "plaintiffs who have been denied the right to marry and are willing to take a public position on that and challenge their inability to marry. Plaintiffs could also be those who were married elsewhere and want the marriage recognized in American Samoa."

Lambda Legal has asked any American Samoan same-sex couple, who has been denied a marriage license, to contact them or the American Civil Liberties Union, the Gay and Lesbian Advocates and Defenders (GLAAD), or the National Center for Lesbian Rights immediately for assistance.

In January 2016, former Attorney General Fiti Alexander Sunia was appointed the new district court judge. His appointment was unanimously confirmed by the American Samoa Senate. During the confirmation hearing, he was asked about the Supreme Court ruling on same-sex marriage. He responded that he had not read the decision, and that the district court does not deal with this issue. He also said that he would not perform weddings for same-sex couples in his new assignment, unless the local marriage laws were first changed. Currently, same-sex marriages are not licensed in American Samoa.

Under the Respect for Marriage Act passed by the 117th United States Congress and signed into law by President Joe Biden in 2022, all territories, including American Samoa, are required to recognize, though not perform, same-sex marriages performed legally in another jurisdiction. The law requires same-sex and opposite-sex couples to be treated equally.

== Gender identity and expression ==
The High Court of American Samoa has held that birth certificates should only be altered to correct information that was erroneous at the time of recordation or to reflect a name change due to adoption. The Office of Vital Statistics has interpreted this ruling to cover applications from transgender individuals. The office will change the name on a birth certificate when presented with a name change order, and may change the gender marker on a birth certificate with medical documentation of the sex change.

== Living conditions ==
American Samoa, like the neighboring country of Samoa, tends to be tolerant and accepting of transgender people and identities. There is a long-standing tradition of raising some boys as girls to play an important domestic role in Samoan communal life. Such individuals are known as the fa'afafine. Well known fa'afafine include artist Dan Taulapapa McMullin, football player Jaiyah Saelua, and beauty pageant Marion Malena.

Nevertheless, American Samoan society is highly religious, and conservative attitudes regarding gender and sexuality tend to dominate. Open displays of affection between couples, same-sex or opposite-sex, may offend.

=== Groups and organizations ===
The main LGBTQ organization in the territory is the Society of Fa'afafine in American Samoa (S.O.F.I.A.S.; Samoan: Sosaiete o Fa'afafine i Amerika Sāmoa). The association annually organizes events and festivals, and campaigns for the betterment of the fa'afafine community in American Samoa.

=== Pride festivals ===
The first Pride festival in American Samoa was held in August 2016 in Utulei. Organized by the Society of Fa'afafine in American Samoa, the event included a pageant, and song, dance and poetry choral competitions.

Beauty pageants among the fa'afafine community are quite popular. Families generally turn up en masse to support their candidates for the title.

== Summary table ==
Same-sex sexual activity legal	Yes (Since 1980)
Equal age of consent (16)	Yes (Since 1980)
Anti-discrimination laws in employment only	No
Anti-discrimination laws in the provision of goods and services	No
Anti-discrimination laws in all other areas (Incl. indirect discrimination, hate speech)	No
Same-sex marriage	No
Recognition of same-sex marriages performed elsewhere	Yes (Since 2022)
Stepchild adoption by same-sex couples	No
Joint adoption by same-sex couples	No
Gays, lesbians and bisexuals allowed to serve openly in the military	Yes (Since 2011)
Transgender people allowed to serve openly in the military	No (Since 2025)
Transvestites allowed to serve openly in the military	No
Intersex people allowed to serve openly in the military	/ Yes (Current DoD policy bans "Hermaphrodites" from serving or enlisting in the military)
Right to change legal gender	Yes
Access to IVF for lesbians	No
Commercial surrogacy for gay male couples	No
MSM allowed to donate blood	No / Yes (Since 2020; 3-month deferral period)

== See also ==
- Politics of American Samoa
- Rights and responsibilities of marriages in the United States
- LGBTQ rights in the United States
- LGBTQ rights in Oceania
