= Love v. Johnson =

- Court: U.S. District Court for the Eastern District of Michigan
- Decided: November 16, 2015
- Citation: 146 F. Supp. 3d 848 (E.D. Mich. 2015)

Case opinions
- Decision by: U.S. District Judge Nancy Edmunds

Love v. Johnson, 146 F. Supp. 3d 848 (E.D. Mich. 2015), was a 2015 case in front of the U.S. District Court for the Eastern District of Michigan. The case involved Michigan's Department of State's policy prohibiting transgender persons from changing the gender on their licenses unless they could provide an amended birth certificate showing their gender.

== Facts ==
Plaintiffs were six transgender persons whose gender identity did not conform to the gender assigned at birth. In 2011, the Michigan Secretary of State implemented a new policy for changing one's gender on a state ID. The policy required that the "individual must provide a certified birth certificate showing the sex of the applicant." Plaintiffs maintained that this policy was onerous and stood in contrast with federal decisions and decisions by numerous states that eased restrictions on changing one's gender on identification documents.

== Result ==
On November 16th, 2015, the defendant's motion for dismissal was denied by the District Court. In her decision denying the motion, U.S. District Judge Nancy Edmunds held that "plaintiffs have raised a cognizable privacy claim under the Fourteenth Amendment to the U.S. Constitution."

On January 10th, 2016, Judge Edmunds later denied the defendants subsequent request for reconsideration of the November 16th, 2015 order. It held that the defendant bore the burden to show that the License Policy was narrowly tailored to furthering a compelling state interest.

In March of 2016, the license policy was updated in response to the controversy to allow the use of a court order or passport to update ones license. This was a significant because gender changes on passports required only a letter from a clinician that the applicant has "undergone appropriate treatment for their gender identity".

On August 23rd, 2016, the court granted the motion for summary judgement because the license policy had been abandoned and was no longer a "live controversy" after to the policy change. Plaintiffs agreed the new policy conformed to "current scientific knowledge and research regarding transgender individuals and the medical standard of care for treating persons diagnosed with gender dysphoria."
