= Transgender American Veterans Association =

Advocacy group

The Transgender American Veterans Association (TAVA) is an advocacy group for transgender veterans from the US military. The Don't ask don't tell policy did not apply to transgender members of the United States military. The group was founded in 2003 by a former Navy and US Army servicepersons.

== Advocacy ==
TAVA commissioned a 2008 report from the Palm Center at the University of California. In 2014, they pushed for keeping current transgender members in the military under new Department of Defense rules.

In March 2015 the association issued two joint reports: one with the American Medical Association and one with The American Military Partner Association.

In 2016, the association called for the U.S. Veteran's Administration to provide surgery for transgender veterans, in a petition filed by the Transgender Law Center and Lambda Legal.

In 2024, TAVA sued VA with the aim of getting gender-affirming surgeries funded and provided by the agency.

== Cultural representation ==
According to The Advocate, "In 2005, when the TAVA put a wreath on the Tomb of the Unknown Soldier, there was a transgender person representing every U.S. military conflict since World War II."

A button from the association is part of the National Museum of American History collection on Lesbian, Gay, Bisexual and Transgender History.
