= LGBTQ rights in the Navajo Nation =

Navajo LGBTQ legal status

- Navajo Nation (within the U.S.)
- Legal status: Legal since 2001
- Gender identity: No recognition
- Discrimination protections: No

Family rights
- Recognition of relationships: No recognition of same-sex relationships
- Restrictions: Same-sex marriage banned since 2005
- Adoption: Same-sex couples banned

Lesbian, gay, bisexual, transgender, and queer (LGBTQ) people in the Navajo Nation, the largest indigenous sovereign state in the United States, face legal challenges not experienced by non-LGBTQ residents. Same-sex sexual activity is legal, but same-sex unions are not recognized, and marriage has been banned by the tribal constitution since 2005. In 2022, a bill was introduced to repeal the ban and recognize same-sex marriage, but has faced challenges on the reservation. In 2023 a second bill was introduced, and passed its initial readings.

== Traditional Navajo belief ==
As with many Native American nations, traditional Navajo belief includes a two-spirit conception of gender-variant individuals and accepts two-spirited individuals as valid members of the community. Nádleehi (Navajo: naadleeh or nádleehé; literally one who constantly transforms) refers to individuals who are a "male-bodied person with a feminine nature". Historically, the Navajo recognized four gender roles: asdzáán (feminine female), hastíín (masculine male), dilbaa (masculine female), and nádleehi (feminine male). The nádleehi identity is fluid, and such individuals may display both male and female characteristics. Due to the perceived "balance" between both sexes, they were typically chosen for certain societal and communal roles, such as spiritual healers. Because of the generational change in attitudes, Navajo LGBT youths may face opposition from their parents' generation but find acceptance from their grandparents.

== Navajo Nation law ==
Same-sex marriage is not valid under Navajo law, even if performed in a jurisdiction such as Arizona where it is legal. The 2015 Obergefell v. Hodges decision, which legalized same-sex marriage in all states and most territories did not require the same of tribal nations. This makes the Navajo Nation the largest territory in the United States, in terms of both land area and population, where same-sex marriage is not recognized. Because of this, same-sex couples do not have the rights accorded by the tribal government to opposite-sex married couples. Same-sex marriage is explicitly prohibited by the Diné Marriage Act (see external links), an amendment to the tribal code enacted on April 22, 2005. The act was vetoed by then–Navajo President Joe Shirley, Jr., but the veto was overridden by the Navajo Nation Council. In the run-up to the 2018 elections, both Shirley and his opponent, Jonathan Nez, said they strongly supported a repeal of the act, and Shirley said they had 14 of the 16 votes needed on the council for repeal but after few months he explained that the council will not support legal same-sex marriage.

=== Endorsement of the Equality Act as federal legislation ===
On August 12, 2019, the Law and Order Committee of the Navajo Nation Council approved a resolution by Delegate Nathaniel Brown to endorse the Equality Act in Congress as federal legislation in a 2–1 vote. Alray Nelson, the founder of Diné Equality praised the legislation, calling it "a major step forward." "This is the first time the Navajo government and its leaders had a deeper conversation about protecting our LGBTQ, two-spirit relatives," Nelson said. "Today was a major step forward because it sends an inclusive message to our community members that Navajo Nation is ready to have this conversation." The resolution will next go to the Health, Education, and Human Services Committee and then the Naabikʼíyátiʼ committee.

On August 27, 2019, the legislation passed the Health, Education, and Human Services Committee, sending it to the Naabikʼíyátiʼ Committee for approval by the Navajo Nation Council.

On September 5, 2019, the Navajo Nation, through official action of the Naabikʼíyátiʼ Committee, approved support for the Equality Act with 16 votes in favor and 0 opposed. The passage of the legislation authorizes the Speaker of the Council, President of the Navajo Nation, and the Navajo Nation Washington Office and its designees to advocate support for the Equality Act to the United States Congress. Alray Nelson, Diné Pride Executive Director said in a statement "The Navajo Nation should be proud today for this historic action taken by our tribal lawmakers. It sends an inclusive message to our LGBTQ+ youth that their Nation is inclusive and they should be proud to be who they are. It is now time that we repeal the discriminatory Diné Marriage Act and treat our LGBTQ+ family members with respect and compassion. They are our relatives & Navajo law should reflect it." Kayenta Council Delegate Nathaniel Brown, sponsor of the legislation (0195–19) said, "When speaking of kinship & relationship to each other, Navajo speaks of compassion & respect. The Equality Act is a giant step in allowing LGBTQ+ communities to be free from discrimination, to be protected from injurious practices & to achieve the full pursuit of happiness as citizens of our Sovereign Nation."

== Summary table ==
Same-sex sexual activity legal	Yes
Equal age of consent	No
Anti-discrimination laws in employment	No
Anti-discrimination laws in the provision of goods and services	No
Anti-discrimination laws in all other areas	No
Same-sex marriages	No (Explicitly banned since 2005)
Recognition of same-sex couples	No
Stepchild adoption by same-sex couples	No
Joint adoption by same-sex couples	No
Access to IVF for lesbians	No
Commercial surrogacy for gay male couples	No
Conversion therapy banned on minors	No
MSMs allowed to donate blood	No

== See also ==
- Same-sex marriage in tribal nations in the United States
