= History of violence against LGBTQ people in the United States =

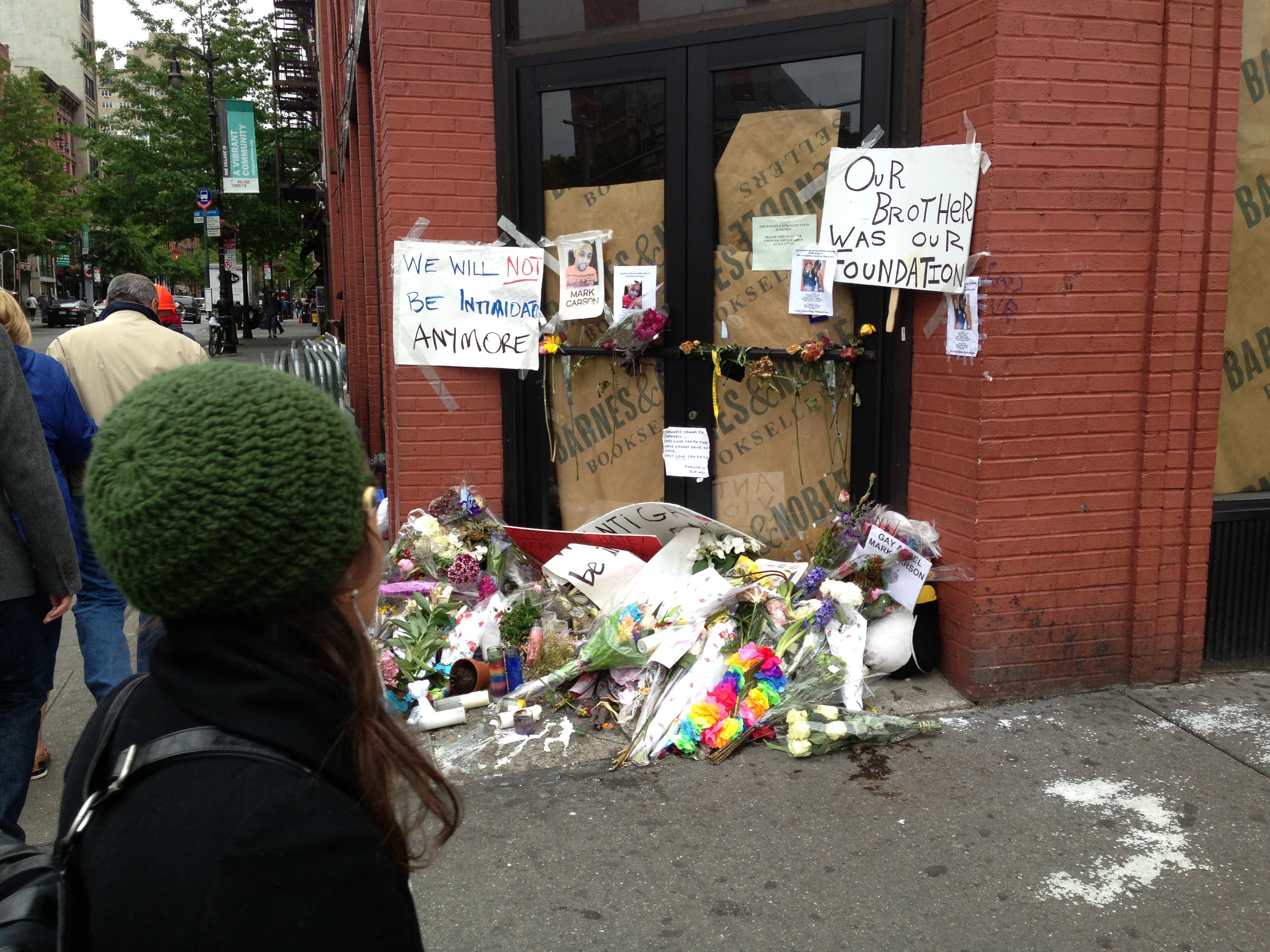
A memorial in May 2013 where Mark Carson, a 32-year-old black gay man, was shot to death by another man who trailed and taunted him and a friend as they walked down the street in New York City's Greenwich Village

The history of violence against LGBTQ people in the United States is made up of assaults on lesbians, gay men, bisexuals, and transgender individuals, legal responses to such violence, and hate crime statistics in the United States of America. The people who are the targets of such violence are believed to violate heteronormative standards and they are also believed to contravene perceived protocols of gender and sexual roles. People who are perceived to be LGBTQ may also be targeted for violence. Violence can also occur between couples who are of the same sex, with statistics showing that lesbians and gay men are equally likely to abuse their partners as their heterosexual male counterparts.

Extensive violence has been directed against the LGBTQ community of the United States for decades. Since the 1969 Stonewall riot against one of the many police raids on gay bars altered the goal of LGBTQ rights activists from assimilation to acceptance, there have been many more reported and unreported instances of violence against LGBTQ people in the United States. Every year, dozens of transgender and gender-nonconforming individuals are murdered in the US, and the murder of black transgender women is especially prevalent. Attacks against LGBTQ people generally center on the idea that there is a normal way for people to live, which encompasses all expressions, desires, behaviors, and roles associated with the sex each person was assigned to at birth, known as heteronormativity and cisnormativity. Over time the number of these acts of violence has increased greatly, whether due to the changing religious and political views, increased community visibility, or other factors. There have been political protests intended to bring about harsher penalties for these crimes.

A hate crime is defined as a crime that victimises individuals because of their actual or perceived race, ethnicity or national origin, sexual orientation, religion, gender, gender identity, or disability. Hate crimes against LGBTQ people often occur because the perpetrators are homophobic or transphobic. Acts of violence which are committed against people because of their perceived sexuality can range from violent assault to murder. These violent actions may be caused by cultural, religious, or political mores and biases. Victims of violence who are both LGBTQ and persons of color may have trouble distinguishing whether the violence was based on their sexuality/gender identity or whether racism also played a significant factor. An intersectional approach would examine how these forms of discrimination combine in unique ways.

The United States passed the Hate Crime Statistics Act (P.L. 101–275) to develop a systematic approach to documenting and understanding hate crimes against LGBTQ people in the United States. The Federal Bureau of Investigation (FBI) has also implemented a data collection program and integrated the system under their Uniform Crime Reporting (UCR) program and National Incident-Based Reporting System (NIBRS).

== Federal hate crime statistics ==
In 2014, the Federal Bureau of Investigation (FBI) reported that 20.8% of hate crimes reported to police in 2013 were founded on sexual orientation. Sixty-one percent of those attacks were against gay men. Additionally, 0.5% of all hate crimes were based on perceived gender identity. In 2004, the FBI reported that 14% of hate crimes due to perceived sexual orientation were against lesbians, 2% against heterosexuals and 1% against bisexuals.

The FBI reported that for 2006, hate crimes against gay people increased from 14% to 16% in 2005, as percentage of total documented hate crimes across the U.S. The 2006 annual report, released on November 19, 2007, also said that hate crimes based on sexual orientation are the third most common type, behind race and religion. In 2008, 17.6% of hate crimes were based on the victim's perceived sexual orientation. Of those crimes, 72.23% were violent in nature. 4,704 crimes were committed due to racial bias and 1,617 were committed due to sexual orientation. Of these, only one murder and one forcible rape were committed due to racial bias, whereas five murders and six rapes were committed based on sexual orientation.

Santa Clara County Deputy District Attorney (DDA) Jay Boyarsky attributed a surge in anti-gay hate crimes, from 3 in 2007 to 14 in 2008, to controversy over Proposition 8. However, the DDA cautioned against reading too much from small statistical samples, pointing out that the vast majority of hate incidents do not get referred to the District Attorney's office.

In 2011, the FBI reported 1,572 hate crime victims targeted based on a sexual orientation bias, making up 20.4% of the total hate crimes for that year. Of the total victims. 56.7% were targeted based on anti-male homosexual bias, 29.6% were targeted based on anti-homosexual bias, and 11.1% were targeted based on anti-female homosexual bias. Not all hate crimes are reported to law enforcement; a report issued by the Bureau of Justice Statistics in 2017 acknowledged that a majority of the 250,000 hate crimes known to have taken place between 2004 and 2015 were not reported to police.

The United States, however, does not make reporting on hate crimes mandatory, meaning the FBI data gathered over the years is not an accurate representation of the correct number of hate crimes against LGBTQ Americans. Community-based anti-violence organizations are extremely valuable when reporting on or gathering statistics about hate crimes.

In recent years LGBTQ violence has been on the rise in the United States. The biggest act of violence occurred in Orlando when Omar Mateen attacked the Pulse nightclub in the city killing 49 and wounding 53 others. This was not only the biggest attack on LGBTQ people but one of the biggest mass shootings in the United States history. By June 2018, the FBI had declined to classify the incident as an anti-gay hate crime, as evidence suggested that Mateen had scouted several different targets before choosing Pulse and that he did not know it was a gay nightclub. There were also 28 Americans who identified as LGBTQ and were killed in 2016 alone. The United States has passed some legislation to combat increasing violence against LGBTQ people. In the late 1990s, the Hate Crime Statistics Act (P.L. 101–275) was passed to try to prevent further hate crimes and enhance criminal sentences for people who do commit them. While this act was passed more than 20 years ago, local police officers often have no training on identification of hate crimes based on sexual preference. In 2009, the Matthew Shepard and James Byrd Jr. Hate Crimes Prevention Act was passed, which added gender, sexual orientation, gender identity, and disability to federal hate crime law.

== Measures to stop violence against LGBTQ people ==
Several organizations have been established over the years to educate people about anti-LGBTQ violence or prevent such violence. Lambda Legal is an organization aimed at protecting civil rights, while True Colors Fund and the Human Rights Campaign are aimed at helping homeless LGBTQ youth to receive healthcare, housing, and education. There are organizations throughout the United States that have been established to provide care for LGBTQ people, such as the National Coalition of Anti-Violence Programs.

== Effects of violence against LGBTQ people ==
There are many effects of violence against LGBTQ people on both their psychological or mental health and physical health. Violent acts, including domestic and sexual abuse, towards the LGBTQ community may lead to depression, PTSD, suicidal behaviors, or trauma. According to the authors of "The Effects of Polyvictimization on Mental and Physical Health Outcomes in an LGBTQ Sample", many people, especially LGBTQ, experience effects of anti-LGBTQ violence: "Although adverse outcomes may result from many different types of trauma exposure, the experience of interpersonal trauma or violence is particularly damaging compared to non-interpersonal trauma, and individuals with histories of interpersonal trauma are at increased risk for developing psychiatric conditions, including post-traumatic stress disorder (PTSD), depression, dissociation, and substance use issues."

Hate crimes also affect the physical health of LGBTQ people. Victims of anti-LGBTQ violence may not want to follow their previous lifestyle. According to the authors of the research article, "Psychological Sequelae of Hate-Crime Victimization Among Lesbian, Gay, and Bisexual Adults", it takes time to recover from the violence. During their experiment, they observed that psychological distress increases for people who experienced violence within the previous 2 years. People who had been victimized more than 2 years ago had more mental issues including depression, anxiety, trauma, and many more: "It might also increase the length of time needed for recovery from a hate crime. In post hoc analyses of distress levels according to year of victimization, we observed that respondents tended to manifest elevated psychological distress if their most recent victimization occurred within the previous 2 years. Among respondents who had been victimized 3 to 5 years earlier, hate-crime victims had more symptoms of depression, anxiety, anger, and traumatic stress than non-bias crime victims."

Violence against LGBTQ people does not exclude youth. LGBTQ youth might experience violence or rejection at school or from their family. For example, "Family violence against gay and lesbian adolescents and young people: a qualitative study." mentions that family reactions to a youth coming out were violent. This then also affects a person's health and quality of life. The author then states how family violence against LGBTQ youth affects them: "Studies show that rejection and family violence in the out-coming process and the non-provision of social support have a direct impact on the health of homosexual adolescents and young people, with consequences such as: social isolation, depression, suicidal ideation and attempt, low performance, low self-esteem, higher social exposures and an increase in internalized homophobia."

== Incidents of violence against LGBTQ people ==
The following is a list of LGBTQ people that have been victims of violence. For many, there is evidence that the attack was related to their LGBTQ identity, but for others there is no documentation that there was a connection between their identity and the attacks.

=== Pre-1969 ===
- September 28, 1958 – Fernando Rios, a gay man from Mexico City who was leading a tour group around New Orleans, was killed by one or more of a group of three college students after leaving the Cafe Lafitte in Exile, a gay bar in the French Quarter. Rios had left the bar with one of the college students, John Farrell, and while in an alley was struck by Farrell and possibly the others, dying later that day.

=== 1969–1979 ===
- March 9, 1969 – Howard Efland, a gay man who had checked into the Dover Hotel in Los Angeles, under the pseudonym J. McCann, was beaten to death by officers of the Los Angeles Police Department.
- June 28, 1969 – Police, in the early morning hours, raided a gay bar, the Stonewall Inn, located in the Greenwich Village neighborhood of Manhattan, New York City. This event sparked the Stonewall riots, which were a series of demonstrations by members of the LGBTQ community.
- June 24, 1973 – An arsonist burned the Upstairs Lounge, a gay bar in New Orleans, killing 32 people.
- May 8, 1977 – Father Jim Brown, a 50-year-old Episcopalian priest, was attacked by two young men shouting homophobic epithets just outside of the Castro District, San Francisco. He was walking with Douglass McKinney when the two teenagers approached and began making obscene anti-gay comments before proceeding to physically assault McKinney and Brown for around four minutes. Neither Brown nor McKinney were wearing clerical robes. Brown's injuries required plastic surgery as they broke his left cheekbone in three places; McKinney was badly bruised but did not require surgery.
- June 21, 1977 – Robert Hillsborough was stabbed to death in San Francisco by a man shouting "faggot".
- July 5, 1978 – A gang of youths armed with baseball bats and tree branches assaulted several men in an area of Central Park in New York City that was known to be frequented by homosexuals. The victims were assaulted at random, but the assailants later confessed that they had deliberately set out to the park to attack homosexuals. One of those injured was former figure skater Dick Button, who was assaulted while watching a fireworks display in the park.
- November 27, 1978 – Openly gay San Francisco city supervisor Harvey Milk, along with Mayor George Moscone, was assassinated by political rival Dan White at San Francisco City Hall. Outrage over the assassinations and the short sentence given to White (seven years) prompted the White Night riots.
- January 1979 – Tennessee Williams was beaten by five teenage boys in Key West. He escaped serious injury. The episode was part of a spate of anti-gay violence inspired by an anti-gay newspaper ad run by a local Baptist minister.
- June 5, 1979 – Terry Knudsen was beaten to death by three men in Loring Park in Minneapolis, Minnesota.
- September 7, 1979 – Robert Allen Taylor was stabbed to death near Loring Park in Minneapolis. A local reporter interviewed the murderer from jail and was told, "I don't like gays. Okay?"
- October 8, 1979 – 17-year-old Stephen Charles of Newark, New Jersey, was beaten, shot, and left for dead at Wolfe's Pond Park on Staten Island by Robert DeLicio, Costabile "Gus" Farace, Farace's cousin Mark Granato, and David Spoto. They also beat Charles' friend, 16-year-old Thomas Moore of Brooklyn. Moore was critically injured but managed to get help at a nearby residence. Moore identified the four men via a lineup four days after the incident. Farace, the leader of the attack, pleaded guilty to first-degree manslaughter and was paroled after eight years, in 1988. He himself was murdered on November 17, 1989.

=== 1980–1989 ===
- April 12, 1981 – Mark Demarias, Jerry "Michael" Penny, Darrel Jones, and Ronald "Sonny" Kenneth Antonevitch were attacked by Chris Lee Richardson and Guy Charles Osbahr at the Little River in Durham, North Carolina. Richardson hit Penny, Jones, and Demarias with a stick while shouting homophobic slurs at them and allegedly said "you’re going to that queer water hole." Richardson and Osbahr knocked out some and cracked most of Penny's teeth. Then they clubbed Antonevitch to death, beating him while holding his head under the water.
- October 7, 1981 – Diane Delia, a transgender woman and drag queen performer was murdered by her husband and her lover.
- 1982 – Rick Hunter and John Hanson were beaten by Minneapolis police outside the Y'all Come Back Saloon on January 1, 1982. Hennepin County Hospital emergency room staff employees testified in court that the police called the two men a homophobic slur while the men were being treated for their injuries.
- 1982 – Robert Altom died after being attacked outside the former JB's Paradise Room on North Vancouver Avenue in Portland, Oregon.
- July 7, 1984 – In Bangor, Maine, Charlie Howard and his boyfriend Roy Ogden were attacked by three teenagers, they caught Howard and threw him over the State Street Bridge into the Kenduskeag Stream, where Howard drowned. Ogden escaped and pulled a fire alarm.
- February 18, 1985 – David Self, a 25-year-old gay man, was choked unconscious, stabbed to death, his body mutilated, and his apartment ransacked by Robert Van Hook, who'd went together to a gay bar with him and had a history of robbing gay men. Van Hook was found guilty of aggravated murder and sentenced to death after unsuccessfully using the gay panic defense at his trial. He was executed in 2018.
- April 28, 1985 – Stephen Matthew Eldridge, a 27-year-old gay man, was stabbed 44 times by Jimmy Luna, a worker of a hospital who was hired by Maureen McDermott, a nurse who was Eldridge's roommate in Van Nuys, CA. Two other men were also involved in the murder. McDermott also insisted Luna to cut off Eldridge's penis to make it look like a "homosexual murder" because she thought the police would not take it as seriously as other killings. Luna was sentenced to life and McDermott was sentenced to death. Luna and the two men he hired to assist him attempted to kill Eldridge multiple times and failed.
- January 17, 1987 – Shelby bookstore murders: Three men were killed and two more were seriously wounded after being shot execution-style at an adult bookstore known as a meeting place for homosexuals. Three or four gunmen were involved in the attack and the gunmen set the bookstore on fire after the shooting. Two members of the White Patriot Party were charged for the shooting, though one was acquitted at trial and the second had his charges dropped. The case is unsolved.
- December 15, 1987 – 26-year-old Anthony Milano, a gay man and artist, was killed in Bucks County, Pennsylvania. His attackers, Frank Chester and Richard Laird, were sentenced to death in Pennsylvania in 1988. Frank Chester was resentenced to life in prison.
- May 13, 1988 – Rebecca Wight was killed when she and her partner, Claudia Brenner, were shot by Stephen Roy Carr while hiking and camping along the Appalachian Trail. Carr later claimed that he became enraged by the couple's lesbianism when he saw them having homosexual relations. Carr was convicted of first degree murder and sentenced to life in prison without parole.
- May 15, 1988 – Tommy Lee Trimble and John Lloyd Griffin, two gay men, were harassed and later shot by Richard Lee Bednarski in Dallas, Texas. Bednarski was later convicted of the two murders but was sentenced to 30 years rather than life in prison. The judge who issued the sentence, Jack Hampton, said later that he did so since the victims were homosexuals who would not have been killed if they "hadn't been cruising the streets" for men. Hampton's comments caused considerable controversy. He was later censured for his remarks and ultimately lost a bid for judicial re-election in 1992.
- November 22, 1988 – Gordon Ray Church, a gay man, was raped, tortured, and murdered by Michael Archuleta and Lance Wood in Utah. Wood was sentenced to life in prison, while Archuleta, who was believed to have been the primary instigator, was sentenced to death.
- December 1988 – Venus Xtravaganza, a 23-year-old transgender performer, was found murdered on Christmas. It was estimated that she had been dead for 4 days. Her body was found in the Duchess hotel in New York City.

=== 1990–1999 ===
- 1990 – James Zappalorti, a gay Vietnam veteran, was stabbed to death in Staten Island, New York.
- July 2, 1990 – Julio Rivera was murdered in New York City by two men who beat him with a hammer and stabbed him with a knife because he was gay.
- July 4, 1991 – Paul Broussard, a Houston-area banker, was murdered. He was attacked by 10 young men along with Clay Anderson and Richard Delaunay, who survived. All ten of the attackers were eventually convicted, with sentences ranging from probation and fine for the respective hospitalization and funeral bills to the 45-year imprisonment of Jon Buice, who confessed to inflicting the fatal stab wound.
- July 31, 1991 – Joel Larson, a 21-year-old gay man, was murdered in Loring Park. Jay Thomas Johnson confessed to the crime.
- August 10, 1991 – John C. Chenoweth, a 48-year-old Minneapolis politician, was murdered on a beach in Minneapolis known to be a gay hangout. The Hennepin County, Minnesota medical examiner had to use dental records to identify Chenoweth. Another man at the beach, 19-year-old Cord Drazst, was seriously wounded. Jay Thomas Johnson confessed and agreed to a plea agreement of two life sentences, with an additional 15 years. When interviewed for the film Licensed to Kill, Johnson stated that he believed he was doing the correct, moral thing in killing homosexuals after watching Pat Robertson's The 700 Club.
- October 26, 1991 – Thanh Nguyen, a 29-year-old gay man, and his lover, Hugh Callaway, 35, were attacked in Reverchon Park by three men. The assailants made repeated homophobic remarks as they beat Callaway and Nguyen for approximately 20 minutes before robbing and then shooting the couple. Corey Ardell Burley, 19 at the time of Nguyen's murder, was convicted of capital murder for shooting Nguyen in the abdomen, a wound from which he later died. Freddie Earl Thorton, 22 at the time of the crime, was arrested on April 15, 1992. The third suspect, Frederick Eugene Kirby, was unnamed at the time Burley was sentenced to life in prison. When interviewed for the 1997 documentary Licensed to Kill, Burley admitted that his actions were motivated by his hatred of homosexuals.
- October 27, 1992 – U.S. Navy Petty Officer Allen Schindler was murdered by a shipmate who stomped him to death in a public restroom in Japan. Schindler had complained repeatedly about anti-gay harassment aboard ship. The case became synonymous with the debate over gay people serving in the US military that had been brewing in the United States culminating in the "Don't ask, don't tell" bill.
- November 19, 1992 – David Schwartz, a 55-year-old Wall Street attorney at Cravath, Swaine & Moore, was stabbed to death by Raymond Childs, then 20, in the Hutchinson Whitestone Hotel after a day trip to Schwartz's Connecticut home. Childs inflicted 27 stab wounds and raised a gay panic defense, but was found guilty of second-degree murder and robbery in the first degree. Childs was paroled from Fishkill Correctional Facility on March 16, 2023. (Note: Inmate status can be checked online; Childs' DIN: 94A5062)
- March 2, 1993 - Venus Landin, co-chair of the African-American Gay Lesbian Alliance of Atlanta, was murdered by her former lover, Bisa Niambi, in a murder-suicide. The 1993 Atlanta Gay Pride Festival was dedicated to her memory, and Venus magazine (established 1995) was named in her honor.
- July 30, 1993 – Chris Miller, a 23-year-old gay man, was murdered by Jeffrey Swinford, Ronnie Lee Birchett, and Bobby John Fox in Little Rock, Arkansas after all four men had gone to Miller's apartment to snort cocaine. Fox and Swinford both pleaded guilty to first degree murder on August 1, 1995; Birchett's case was 'converted' because he was only 17 at the time. Fox served six years for the murder before being paroled; when he fled to east Texas in 2001, he used the name Brian Stucker. Asked about killing Miller in the documentary Licensed to Kill, Swinford said Miller's death meant there was "one less problem the world had to mess with".
- August 6, 1993 – U.S. Army Sergeant Kenneth Junior French entered Luigi's Restaurant in Fayetteville, NC and began shooting people at random with no regard to their own sexuality. French stated his motive for the mass shooting was simply because he was angry; at the time of the incident, survivors recalled French saying, "I'll show you, Clinton [...] I'll show you about gays in the military." before opening fire, referencing the 'Don't Ask, Don't Tell' policy President Bill Clinton put in place to allow homosexuals to serve in the U.S. military. He killed Peter Parrous, the owner of the restaurant, and his wife Ethel Parrous, as well as patrons Wesley Scott Cover and James F. Kidd and wounded 7 others. He discussed his motives with Arthur Dong for the documentary Licensed to Kill.
- November 30, 1993 – Nicholas West, 23, was kidnapped and murdered in Tyler, Texas by three men. They robbed him, beat him and drove him to a remote Smith County location where they shot him, multiple times. Two of them were found guilty of capital murder and executed, while the third received a life sentence for kidnapping and aggravated robbery.
- December 25, 1993 – Brandon Teena, a trans man, was raped and, six days later, killed when Richardson County, Nebraska police revealed that he was AFAB to male friends of his. His attacker, John Lotter, was sentenced to death. The events leading to Teena's death were depicted in the movie Boys Don't Cry. The county was found to be a negligent party in Teena's death and was ordered to pay $17,360 in restitution to Teena's family.
- June 1994 – Allen Yollin, a gay man, was assaulted in Philadelphia by Thomas Grafton and Patrick Groce. Grafton and Groce shouted homophobic invective at Yollin as he walked down the road before parking their car and physically assaulting Yollin. Both Grafton and Groce were arrested shortly afterward. Grafton was sentenced to 4.5–9 years. Groce did not show up for sentencing and lived free in Delaware County, Pennsylvania until May 2011 when Judge Harold Kane sentenced him to less than 2 years in prison, allowing him to leave during the day to go to his job, with 7 years probation to follow.
- March 9, 1995 – Scott Amedure was murdered after publicly revealing a crush to acquaintance Jonathan Schmitz on an episode of The Jenny Jones Show about secret crushes. Three days after the episode's taping, Schmitz purchased a shotgun and killed Amedure by firing two shots into his chest. Schmitz then turned himself in to police.
- November 20, 1995 – Chanelle Pickett, 23, an African American trans woman, died at the home of William C. Palmer after a fight that, according to Palmer, ensued after Palmer discovered that she was transgender and demanded she leave his home. Patrons of the Playland Café, where they had met, said that Palmer was a regular there with a well known preference for transsexuals.
- December 4, 1995 – Roxanne Ellis and Michelle Abdill, a lesbian couple in Medford, Oregon, were murdered by a man who said he had "no compassion" for bisexual or homosexual people. Robert Acremant was convicted and sentenced to death by lethal injection, but later, his sentence was reduced to life. He died in prison of natural causes in 2018.
- January 4, 1996 – Fred Mangione, a gay man, was murdered in Texas by two Neo-Nazi brothers. His partner, Kenneth Stern, was also attacked, but survived. One of the attackers, Ronald Henry Gauthier, later received a 10-year probation sentence.
- May 1996 – Julianne Williams, 24, and Lollie Winans, 26, were murdered at their campsite along the Appalachian Trail on Virginia's Skyline Drive in Shenandoah National Park. They were bound and gagged and their throats were slit. To date, there has been no conviction in the murders.
- August 1, 1996 – Nick Moraida, a 34-year-old Latino gay man, was murdered during a robbery. His murderer, Richard Cartwright, was sentenced to death and executed by lethal injection on May 19, 2005.
- February 21, 1997 – Otherside Lounge bombing, a lesbian nightclub in Atlanta, was bombed by Eric Robert Rudolph, the "Olympic Park Bomber;" five bar patrons were injured. In a statement released after he was sentenced to five consecutive life terms for his several bombings, Rudolph called homosexuality an "aberrant lifestyle".
- October 7, 1998 – Matthew Shepard, a gay student, in Laramie, Wyoming, was tortured, beaten severely, tied to a fence, and abandoned; he was found 18 hours after the attack and succumbed to his injuries less than a week later, on October 12. His attackers, Russell Arthur Henderson and Aaron James McKinney are both serving two consecutive life sentences in prison.
- February 19, 1999 – Billy Jack Gaither, a 39-year-old gay man, was brutally beaten to death in Rockford, Alabama. His attackers, Steve Mullins and Charles Monroe Butler were found guilty of murder and were both sentenced to life imprisonment without parole.
- July 1, 1999 – Gay couple Gary Matson and Winfield Mowder was murdered by white supremacist brothers Benjamin Matthew and James Tyler Williams in Redding, California. James Williams was sentenced to a minimum of 33 years in prison, to be served after his completion of a 21-year sentence for firebombing synagogues and an abortion clinic. Benjamin Williams claimed that by killing the couple, he was "obeying the laws of the Creator". He died by suicide in 2003 while he was awaiting trial. Their former pastor described the brothers as "zealous in their faith" but according to him, they were "far from kooks".
- July 6, 1999 – Barry Winchell, a 21-year-old infantry soldier in the United States Army, was bludgeoned to death with a baseball bat as he slept in his barracks at Fort Campbell after being harassed for his relationship with Calpernia Addams. His assailants, Calvin Glover (18) and Justin Fisher (26) were charged with his murder. Glover was sentenced to life in prison and Fisher was sentenced to 12.5 years but only served 7.
- September 1999 – Steen Fenrich was murdered, apparently by his stepfather, John D. Fenrich, in Queens, New York. His dismembered remains were found in March 2000, with the phrase "gay nigger number one" scrawled on his skull along with his social security number. His stepfather fled from police while being interviewed, then killed himself.
- October 15, 1999 – Charles "Sissy" Bolden was found shot to death in Savannah, Georgia. Police arrested Charles E. Wilkins, Jr., in July 2003; he admitted the killing and was charged with two other homicides, according to the Savannah Police Department.

=== 2000–2009 ===
On April 29, 2009, the U.S. House of Representatives voted to extend federal law to classify as "hate crimes" attacks based on a victim's sexual orientation or gender identity (as well as mental or physical disability). The U.S. Senate passed the bill on October 22, 2009. The Matthew Shepard and James Byrd, Jr. Hate Crimes Prevention Act was signed into law by President Barack Obama on October 28, 2009.

- July 3, 2000 – Arthur "J.R." Warren was punched and kicked to death in Grant Town, West Virginia, by two teenage boys who reportedly believed Warren had spread a rumor that he and one of the boys, David Allen Parker, had a sexual relationship. Warren's killers ran over his body to disguise the murder as a hit-and-run. Parker pleaded guilty and was sentenced to "life in prison with mercy", making him eligible for parole after 15 years. His accomplice, Jared Wilson, was sentenced to 20 years.
- September 22, 2000 – Ronald Gay entered a gay bar in Roanoke, Virginia, and opened fire on the patrons, killing Danny Overstreet, 43 years old, and severely injuring six others. Ronald said he was angry over what his name now meant, and deeply upset that three of his sons had changed their surname. He claimed that he had been told by God to find and kill lesbians and gay men, describing himself as a "Christian Soldier working for my Lord"; Gay testified in court that "he wished he could have killed more fags", before several of the shooting victims as well as Danny Overstreet's family and friends.
- January 14, 2001 – Tzatzi Sanchez, a Mexican 27-year-old lesbian woman, was tied up, raped and then strangled in her home in Las Vegas, Nevada, by Luis Barroso and Obed Marroquin-Valle. Barroso had been hired by Sanchez's ex-girlfriend, Marcela Whaley, to murder her. Marroquin-Valle had broken into Sanchez's home with Barroso, but had not conspired with Whaley.
- June 16, 2001 – Fred Martinez Jr., a 16-year-old transgender and two-spirit student, was bludgeoned to death near Cortez, Colorado, by 18-year-old Shaun Murphy, who reportedly bragged about attacking a "fag".
- August 25, 2001 Gary Raynal was found brutally beaten to death in Leawood, Kansas. The case is still unsolved and family members believe his death was a hate crime.
- December 12, 2001 – Terrianne Summers, a 51-year-old trans woman and activist for transgender rights, was shot and killed in her front yard in Florida. No arrests were made, and police did not investigate her murder as a hate crime. Terrianne's high visibility as a trans woman due to her work as an activist has led her to be included in lists of anti-LGBTQ hate crimes, although lack of police interest in her murder means the motives behind the killing may never be known.
- May 17, 2002 – Gary McMurtry "Brazon" a 36-year-old Ohio drag queen performer was stabbed with a sword by Michael Jennings. Jennings was sentenced to 25 years to life.
- June 12, 2002 – Philip Walsted, a gay man, was fatally beaten with a baseball bat. According to prosecutors, the neo-Nazi views of Walsted's assailant, David Higdon, led to what was originally a robbery escalating to murder. Higdon was sentenced to life in prison, plus an additional sentence for robbery.
- August 6, 2002 – Rodney Velasquez, a 26-year-old Latino gay man, was found murdered in the bathtub of his Bronx apartment.
- October 3, 2002 – Gwen Amber Rose Araujo, a 17-year-old teenage trans woman, was tortured and murdered by four men, who beat and strangled her after discovering that she was transgender. Two of the defendants were convicted of second-degree murder, but not the requested hate-crime enhancements to the charges. The other two defendants pleaded guilty or no-contest to voluntary manslaughter.
- December 24, 2002 – Nizah Morris, a 47-year-old black trans woman, was possibly murdered in Philadelphia, Pennsylvania.
- May 11, 2003 – Sakia Gunn, a black 15-year-old lesbian, was murdered in Newark, New Jersey. While waiting for a bus, Gunn and her friends were propositioned by two men. When the girls rejected their advances, declaring themselves to be lesbians, the men attacked them. One of the men, Richard McCullough, fatally stabbed Gunn. In exchange for his pleading guilty to several lesser crimes including aggravated manslaughter, prosecutors dropped murder charges against McCullough, who was sentenced to 20 years.
- June 17, 2003 – Guin Richie Phillips of Elizabethtown, Kentucky, was killed by Joshua Cottrell. His body was later found in a suitcase in Rough River Lake. During his trial, two of Cottrell's relatives testified that he lured Phillips to his death, and killed him because he was gay. Cottrell was convicted of manslaughter and sentenced to 20 years in prison – the maximum allowed by Kentucky statute – despite a jury recommendation of 30 years, which made Cottrell eligible for parole two-and-a-half years after the trial ended in February 2005.
- July 23, 2003 – Nireah Johnson and her friend, Brandie Coleman, were shot to death by Paul Moore, when Moore learned after a sexual encounter that Johnson was transgender. Moore then burned his victims' bodies. He was convicted of murder and sentenced to 120 years in prison.
- July 31, 2003 – 37-year-old Glenn Kopitske was shot and stabbed in the back by 17-year-old Gary Hirte in Winnebago County, Wisconsin. Prosecutors contended that Hirte murdered Kopitske to see if he could get away with it. Hirte pleaded insanity, claiming he killed Kopitske in a murderous rage after a consensual sexual encounter with the victim, because he felt a homosexual act was "worse than murder". The 'temporary insanity' mitigation plea was not upheld, he was found guilty, and received a life sentence.
- August 2003 – Emonie Spaulding, a black 25-year-old trans woman, was shot to death in Washington, D.C., by Derrick Antwan Lewis after he discovered she was trans.
- December, 2003 – Jason Galehouse and Michael Wachholtz, two 26-year-old gay men, were raped, tortured and murdered by Steven Lorenzo, in Tampa, Florida. Galehouse's body was never found. Lorenzo was sentenced to death.
- February 17, 2004 – 24-year old Sean Owen was murdered at the Eno River in Durham, North Carolina by men he connected with on a gay.com chatroom.
- June 5, 2004 – 23-year-old Jesse Valencia was murdered on Columbia, Missouri by his gay lover, Steven Arthur Rios, who was married and was a police officer. Rios was sentenced to life in prison.
- July 22, 2004 – 18-year-old Scotty Joe Weaver of Bay Minette, Alabama, was murdered. His burned and partially decomposed body was discovered a few miles from the mobile home in which he lived. He was beaten, strangled and stabbed numerous times, and his body was doused in gasoline and set on fire. Three people were charged with capital murder and robbery in connection with the crime, two of whom were Weaver's roommates: Christopher Gaines, aged 20, Nichole Kelsay, aged 18, and Robert Porter, aged 18. Nichole Kelsay had been Weaver's friend throughout most of his life. Gaines pleaded guilty to capital murder in May 2007 and was sentenced to life without parole. In September 2007, Porter also pleaded guilty and was sentenced to two terms of life imprisonment. Nichole Kelsay pleaded guilty and received a 20-year sentence.
- July 28, 2004 – Roderick George, a 40-year-old man, died in Montgomery, Alabama from a gunshot wound. He had been found in his car on July 27. The suspect in the case, Anthony T. Johnson, confessed to the crime, claiming that George made sexual advances and even "lunged at" Johnson. Police charged Johnson with capital murder.
- October 2, 2004 – Daniel Fetty, a gay man who was hearing-impaired and homeless, was attacked by multiple assailants in Waverly, Ohio. Fetty was beaten, stomped, shoved nude into a garbage bin, impaled with a stick, and left for dead; he succumbed to his injuries the next day. Prosecutors alleged a hate crime. Three men received sentences ranging from seven years to life.
- January 28, 2005 – Ronnie Antonio Paris, a three-year-old boy living in Tampa, Florida, died due to brain injuries inflicted by his father, Ronnie Paris, Jr. According to his mother and other relatives, Ronnie Paris, Jr., repeatedly slammed his son into walls, slapped the child's head, and "boxed" him because he was concerned the child was gay and would grow up a sissy. Paris was sentenced to thirty years in prison.
- On February 27, 2005, in Santa Fe, New Mexico, 21-year-old James Maestas was assaulted outside a restaurant, then followed to a hotel and beaten unconscious by men who called him "faggot" during the attack. Although all of his attackers were charged with committing a hate crime, none was sentenced to prison.
- March 11, 2005 – Jason Gage, an openly gay man, was murdered in his Waterloo, Iowa, apartment by an assailant, Joseph Lawrence, who claimed Gage had made sexual advances to him. Gage was bludgeoned to death with a bottle, and stabbed in the neck, probably post-mortem, with a shard of glass. Lawrence was sentenced to fifty years in prison.
- October 19, 2005 – Billy Sanford, a 52-year-old man, was attacked by handyman Marcus Dewayne Kelley, 26, in Montgomery, Alabama. Kelley claimed that Sanford had made repeated sexual advances toward him. Kelley beat Sanford with a hammer, putting him in a coma. Kelley was apprehended November 14, 2005. Sanford remained in a coma through at least December 6, 2005.
- October 25, 2005 – Emanuel Xavier, an openly gay poet and activist, was surrounded and brutally beaten by a group of fifteen to twenty teens on the streets of Bushwick which left him permanently deaf in his right ear.
- November 26, 2005 – James Oliver Bailey, an 80-year-old man, was murdered in his home in Lake Jordan, Alabama. He was murdered by Chris Nieves of Marbury, Alabama who hit the elderly man with a two-by-four and later claimed that Bailey made sexual advances toward him.
- February 2, 2006 – 18-year-old Jacob D. Robida entered a bar in New Bedford, Massachusetts, confirmed that it was a gay bar, and then attacked patrons with a hatchet and a handgun, wounding three. He fatally shot himself three days later.
- June 10, 2006 – Kevin Aviance, a female impressionist, musician, fashion designer and "oldest daughter" of the legendary House of Aviance was robbed and beaten in Manhattan by a group of men who yelled anti-gay slurs at him. Four assailants pleaded guilty and received prison sentences.
- July 30, 2006 – Six men were attacked with baseball bats and knives after leaving the San Diego Gay Pride festival. One victim was injured so severely that he had to undergo extensive facial reconstructive surgery. Three men pleaded guilty in connection with the attacks and received prison sentences. A 15-year-old juvenile also pleaded guilty.
- October 8, 2006 – Michael Sandy was attacked by four young heterosexual men who lured him into meeting after chatting online, while they were looking for gay men to rob. He was struck by a car while trying to escape his attackers, and died five days later without regaining consciousness.
- February 27, 2007 – Andrew Anthos, a 72-year-old disabled gay man, was beaten with a lead pipe in Detroit, Michigan, by a man who was shouting anti-gay slurs at him. Anthos died 10 days later in the hospital.
- March 15, 2007 – Ryan Keith Skipper, a 25-year-old gay man, was stabbed to death in Wahneta, Florida. Four suspects were arrested for the crime. The Sheriff called it a hate crime.
- March 16, 2007 – Ruby Ordeñana, a 24-year-old Latina transgender woman, was found naked and strangled to death in San Francisco, California, at 5:40 am. Donzell Francis, who was suspected of raping and strangling Ordeñana, was convicted on December 23, 2009, and sentenced to 17 years and 18 months in prison for forcible oral copulation, robbery, assault causing great bodily injury, and false imprisonment of another transgender woman.
- May 12, 2007 – Roberto Duncanson was murdered in Brooklyn, New York. He was stabbed to death by Omar Willock, who claimed Duncanson had flirted with him.
- May 16, 2007 – Sean William Kennedy, 20, was walking to his car from Brew's Bar in Greenville, South Carolina, when Stephen Andrew Moller, 18, got out of another car and approached Kennedy. Investigators said that Moller made a comment about Kennedy's sexual orientation, and threw a fatal punch because he did not like the other man's sexual preference.
- September 9, 2007 – A gay bashing occurred in the Towers West Quiznos on the campus of Vanderbilt University in Nashville, Tennessee. A student, Robert Gutierrez, and a non-student hurled homophobic abuse at two gay students and beat one up. A report was filed with the Vanderbilt University Police Department, and Gutteriez was reportedly suspended, although it could not be confirmed. Gutteriez dismissed it as "just a fight", but the dean of students suggested it was "a premeditated, unprovoked attack". The victims were not named to protect their anonymity.
- October 2007 – Steven Domer, a 62-year-old gay man, was murdered in Oklahoma.
- December 8, 2007 – 25-year-old gay man Nathaniel Salerno was attacked by four men on a Metro train in Washington, DC. The men called him "faggot" while they beat him.
- January 8, 2008 – Stacey Brown, a black 30-year-old trans woman, was found dead in her apartment. She had been shot in the head.
- July 1, 2008 – Ebony Whitaker, an African American trans woman, was shot and killed in Memphis.
- February 2008 – Duanna Johnson, a trans woman, was beaten by a police officer while she was held in the Shelby County Criminal Justice Center in Tennessee. Johnson said the officers reportedly called her a "faggot" and "he-she", before and during the incident. In November 2008, she was found dead in the street, reportedly gunned down by three unknown individuals.
- February 4, 2008 – Ashley Sweeney, a trans woman, was shot in the head. Her body was found in Detroit, Michigan.
- February 10, 2008 – Sanesha Stewart, a 25-year-old black trans woman, was stabbed to death in Bronx, New York.
- February 12, 2008 – Lawrence "Larry" King, a 15-year-old junior high school student, was shot twice by a classmate at E.O. Green School in Oxnard, California. He was taken off life support after doctors declared him brain dead on February 15. According to Associated Press reports, "prosecutors have charged a 14-year-old classmate with premeditated murder with hate-crime and firearm-use enhancements".
- February 22, 2008 – Simmie Williams Jr. was a black gender-nonconforming 17-year-old, who was shot dead on a street corner in Broward County, Florida.
- March 16, 2008 – Police say Lance Neve was beaten unconscious in Rochester, New York because Neve was gay. A man attacked Neve at a bar leaving him with a fractured skull and a broken nose. Jesse Parsons was sentenced to more than five years in prison for the assault.
- May 29, 2008 – Eighteen-year-old Steven Parrish, a member of the 92 Family Swans subgroup of the Bloods, was murdered by Steven T. Hollis III and Juan L. Flythe on orders from gang leader Timothy Rawlings Jr., in Baltimore County, Maryland after they found "gay messages" on his cell phone. They felt having a gay member would make their gang appear weak. Hollis III pleaded guilty and was sentenced to life in prison, Flythe was given a life sentence with all but 30 years suspended, and Rawlings was sentenced to life in prison without the possibility of parole. A fourth man, Benedict Wureh, pleaded guilty to being an accessory after the fact and was sentenced to time served, about 17 months.
- June 9, 2008 – Jeremy Waggoner, an openly gay hairstylist from Royal Oak, Michigan, was brutally murdered in Detroit. His murder is still unsolved.
- July 17, 2008 – Eighteen-year-old Angie Zapata, a trans woman, was beaten to death in Colorado two days after meeting Allen Ray Andrade. The case was prosecuted as a hate crime, and Andrade was found guilty of first degree murder on April 22, 2009.
- August 20, 2008 – Nahkia Williams, a black trans woman, was shot to death in Louisville, Kentucky. Damon Malone was charged with her murder, robbery, and burglary, and sentenced to 35 years in prison.
- September 7, 2008 – Tony Randolph Hunter, 27, and his partner were attacked and beaten near a gay bar in Washington, D.C. Hunter later died from his injuries on September 18. Police are investigating it as a possible hate crime.
- September 13, 2008 – 26-year-old Nima Daivari was attacked in Denver, Colorado, by a man who called him "faggot". The police that arrived on the scene refused to make a report of the attack.
- September 21, 2008 – 22-year-old trans woman Ruby Molina's nude body was found facedown on the bank of a river in isolated and undeveloped area in Sacramento, California.
- November 7, 2008 – The home of openly gay Melvin Whistlehunt in Newton, North Carolina, was destroyed by arsonists. Investigators found homophobic graffiti spray-painted on the back of the house.
- November 14, 2008 – 22-year-old Lateisha Green, a trans woman, was shot and killed by Dwight DeLee in Syracuse, New York, because he thought she was gay. Local news media reported the incident with her legal name, Moses "Teish" Cannon. DeLee was convicted of first-degree manslaughter as a hate crime on July 17, 2009, and received the maximum sentence of 25 years in state prison. This was only the second time in the nation's history that a person was prosecuted for a hate crime against a transgender person and the first hate crime conviction in New York state.
- December 12, 2008 – A 28-year-old lesbian in Richmond, California, was kidnapped and gang raped by four men who made homophobic remarks during the attack.
- December 26, 2008 – Taysia Elzy, a 34-year-old trans woman, and her partner, 22-year-old Michael Hunt, were shot to death and left for dead in their apartment by 20-year-old Chris Conwell.
- December 27, 2008 – 24-year-old Nathan Runkle was brutally assaulted in Dayton, Ohio, outside a gay nightclub.
- January 17, 2009 – Caprice Curry, a 31-year-old trans woman in San Francisco, California, was stabbed to death.
- February 15, 2009 – Efosa Agbontaen and Branden McGillvery-Dummett were attacked in New York City by four young men with glass bottles and box cutters who used anti-gay slurs during the attack. Agbontaen and McGillvery-Dummett both required emergency room treatment for their injuries.
- February 18, 2009 – Two men were arrested in Stroudsburg, Pennsylvania, for the stabbing death of gay veteran Michael Goucher.
- March 1, 2009 – Three men entered a bar in Galveston, Texas, and attacked patrons with rocks. One of the victims, Marc Bosaw, was sent to the emergency room to have twelve staples in his head.
- March 14, 2009 – A gay couple leaving a Britney Spears concert in Newark, New Jersey, were attacked by 15 teens. Josh Kehoe and Bobby Daniel Caldwell were called "faggots" and beaten. Caldwell suffered a broken jaw.
- March 23, 2009 – Two gay men were attacked in Seaside, Oregon, and left lying unconscious on a local beach. The men regained consciousness and were treated at a nearby hospital.
- April 6, 2009 – Carl Joseph Walker-Hoover, an 11-year-old child in Springfield, Massachusetts, hanged himself with an extension cord after being bullied all school year by peers who said "he acted feminine" and was gay.
- April 10, 2009 – Justin Goodwin, 36, of Salem, Massachusetts, was attacked and beaten by as many as six people outside a bar in Gloucester, Massachusetts. Goodwin suffered a shattered jaw, broken eye socket, broken nose and broken cheekbone. Goodwin later died by suicide. Brothers Jonathan and William Chadwick, both of Gloucester, and John Curley-Brotman of Boston, Massachusetts, pleaded guilty to charges of assault and battery with a dangerous weapon. The assault was not considered a hate crime by authorities despite pressure from the Goodwin family to declare it so. On June 23, 2010, the Chadwick brothers were each sentenced to four years in state prison, and Curley-Brotman was sentenced to two years in the county jail of Middleton, Massachusetts.
- June 18, 2009 – Patti Hammond Shaw, an African-American trans woman, turned herself into a police station in Washington, D.C., after receiving a letter saying there was a warrant for her arrest on charges of making a false police report. Despite producing documents supporting her right to be housed with other women, she was placed in a men's facility. According to her suit, officers "groped her breasts, buttocks and between her legs repeatedly and excessively". She is now suing Washington D.C. Metropolitan Police Department and the U.S. Marshals service for the treatment she received.
- June 30, 2009 – Seaman August Provost was found shot to death and his body burned at his guard post on Camp Pendleton. LGBTQ community leaders "citing military sources initially said that Provost's death was a hate crime." Provost had been harassed because of his sexual orientation. Military leaders have since explained that "whatever the investigation concludes, the military's "Don't ask, don't tell" policy prevented Provost from seeking help." Family and friends believe he was murdered because he was openly gay (or bisexual according to some family and sources); the killer died by suicide a week later after admitting the murder, the Navy have not concluded if this was a hate crime.
- July 19, 2009 – Teresa Butz and Jennifer Hopper, a lesbian couple, were raped in their apartment in South Park, Seattle by Isaiah Kalebu. Kalebu slashed Hopper's throat and stabbed Butz in the heart after she fought back. Butz died after escaping the apartment. Hopper lived and testified against Kalebu. Kalebu was sentenced to life in prison with an additional 98 years.
- October 25, 2009 – Dee Green, a trans woman, was found by police unconscious, stabbed in the heart, and bleeding on a street in Baltimore, Maryland. She was taken to a hospital where she died half an hour later. Larry Douglas was charged with first-degree murder in April 2010.
- November 2009 – Jason Mattison Jr., an openly gay 15-year-old boy, was violently murdered and raped at his aunt's house by 35-year-old Dante Parrish, a family friend who had been in prison for murder previously. Parrish was convicted for Mattison's murder and in April 2012 was sentenced to life without parole (the conviction included a second life term for attempted sexual assault).
- December 9, 2009 – Mariah Malina Qualls' body was found in a San Francisco hotel. She was a 23-year-old transgender woman who volunteered and was a member of the Asian & Pacific Islander Wellness Center's TRANS:THRIVE community.
- December 25, 2009 – Robert LeCompte, a 39-year-old gay man and manager of The Drama Club in Houma, LA, was found murdered from sharp-force trauma on the floor of the club. Jorrell Young, a former employee of the venue, has been convicted of the crime; he maintains that he did not commit the killing himself, admitting only to being present when it happened.

=== 2010–2019 ===
==== 2010 ====
- January 18, 2010 – The half-naked corpse of Myra Chanel Ical, a 51-year-old trans woman, was found in a vacant lot in Houston, Texas.
- March 30, 2010 – Amanda Gonzalez-Andujar, a 29-year-old Latina trans woman, was found dead in her Queens, New York, apartment. The autopsy found that her attacker, Rasheen Everett, had strangled her, then doused her body with bleach. In December 2013 Everett was sentenced to 29 years to life. At sentencing Everett's lawyer, John Scarpa, disputed the sentence with the statement: "Who is the victim in this case? Is the victim a person in the higher end of the community?" The judge, Queens Supreme Court Justice Richard Buchter, responded, "This court believes every human life is sacred ... It's not easy living as a transgender, and I commend the family for supporting her."
- April 3, 2010 – Toni Alston, a black 44-year-old transgender woman, was shot in the front door of her home in western Charlotte, North Carolina.
- May 7, 2010 – Dana A. "Chanel" Larkin, a 26-year-old black trans woman who worked as a prostitute, was shot three times in the head by her client, Andrew Olacirequi, after she asked him if he was okay with them having sex despite her male genitalia. She was found dead on the pavement of a Milwaukee street.
- June 21, 2010 – Sandy Woulard, a 28-year-old trans woman, was shot in the chest in South Side, Chicago. A passing motorist found her lying in the street, and she was pronounced dead at the hospital.
- September 11, 2010 – Victoria Carmen White, a 28-year-old black transgender woman, died of bullet wounds in her New Jersey apartment. It is unknown whether she was targeted by her killer, Alrashim Chambers, for her gender identity.
- October 2010 – Jadon Higganbothan, a 4-year-old boy, was shot and killed by Peter Lucas Moses, a local Black Hebrew Israelite leader, because he believed Higganbothan was gay. Moses also killed Hugganbothan's mother, Antoinetta Yvonne McKoy, and buried their bodies in his backyard in Durham, North Carolina.
- October 3, 2010 – A 30-year-old male known as "la Reina" (the Queen), and two teens, both 17, were kidnapped in the Bronx by a homophobic group of youths calling themselves the Latin King Goonies, sodomized by foreign objects including a plunger and baseball bat, burned with cigarettes, and tortured for hours. One of the teenage victims had wanted to join the gang the attackers were part of, but when members saw him with the 30-year-old, they later picked him up and took him to an abandoned apartment, and asked him if the two had had sex. When the teenager responded positively, he was beaten and sodomized. The gang later picked up the second teenager whom they had also seen with the 30-year-old and repeated the process. They then lured the 30-year-old to the building with the promise of a party. When he arrived with alcohol, the gang tied him up and tortured him, and made the 17-year-old burn him with cigarettes. They then robbed the man's 40-year-old brother, coercing him by putting a cellphone to his ear so he could hear his brother beg to pay them.
- October 14, 2010 – Stacey Blahnik Lee, a 31-year-old black trans woman, was found murdered in her Philadelphia home by her boyfriend.
- November 17, 2010 – 18-year-old Joshua Wilkerson was found dead in a field in Pearland, Texas, after being beaten to death and set on fire by a friend of five years, Hermilo Moralez. This was supposedly retaliation for unwanted sexual advances.
- December 2010 – Kevin Mark Powell and Stephen Duane Adams, a married gay couple from Florida, were shot in their home by Peter Avsenew. Prior to his sentencing, Avsenew sent a letter to a judge, which said "You will never be able to stop me. It is my duty as a white man to cull the weak and timid from existence. I will stand up for what I believe in and eradicate anything in my way. Homosexuals are a disgrace to mankind and must be put down. These weren't the first and they won't be the last". Avsenew was sentenced to death for first-degree murder.

==== 2011 ====
- January 11, 2011 – Chrissie Bates, a 45-year-old transgender woman, was stabbed to death in her downtown Minneapolis apartment. Arnold Darwin Waukazo was sentenced to 367 months in prison for the murder.
- January 12, 2011 – The body of Murray Seidman, a 70-year-old man with an intellectual disability, was discovered stoned to death by John Joe Thomas. Thomas and Seidman were friends prior to the murder and Thomas had convinced Seidman to sign over power of attorney to him. The Delaware County, Pennsylvania medical examiner determined that Seidman died between January 2 and January 7, 2011. Thomas initially acted distraught after calling the police himself on January 12, but he later raised a gay panic defense. Seidman's brother Lenny refuted any such claims. Eventually, Thomas pleaded guilty and was sentenced to 20 to 40 years in prison.
- February 19, 2011 – Tyra Trent, a black 25-year-old trans woman, was found strangled to death in a vacant house.
- March 2011 – Tory Minnick, a bisexual 21-year-old woman was shot twice in the head by her girlfriend, Erin Everett. After shooting her, Everett smashed Minnick's face with a claw hammer.
- April 2011 – Kevin Pennington, a gay 28-year-old male, was kidnapped and severely beaten in a Kentucky park by two men shouting anti-gay epithets. David Jason Jenkins and Anthony Ray Jenkins face possible life sentences for anti-gay hate crimes. On March 15, 2012, the Kentucky State Police assisted the FBI in arresting David Jenkins, Anthony Jenkins, Mable Jenkins, and Alexis Jenkins of Partridge, Kentucky, for the beating of Kevin Pennington during a late-night attack in April 2011 at Kingdom Come State Park, near Cumberland. The push came from the gay-rights group Kentucky Equality Federation, whose president, Jordan Palmer, began lobbying the U.S. Attorney for the Eastern District of Kentucky in August 2011 to prosecute after stating he had no confidence in the Harlan County Commonwealth's Attorney to act. "I think the case's notoriety may have derived in large part from the Kentucky Equality Federation efforts," said Harvey, the U.S. Attorney for the Eastern District of Kentucky. Mable Jenkins and Alexis Jenkins pled guilty.
- April 18, 2011 - Norma Hurtado and Maria Hurtado, a young lesbian woman and her mother respectively, were shot by Jose Aviles at their home in Houston, Texas. Aviles disapproved of Norma Hurtado's relationship with his daughter, and was subsequently sentenced to life in prison for his crimes.
- April 22, 2011 – Chrissy Lee Polis, a 22-year-old trans woman, was beaten in a violent struggle by two African-American women for entering the women's bathroom in Baltimore County, Maryland, which triggered her to have a seizure. A McDonald's employee, who was later fired, filmed the encounter and released the film on the internet; it since went viral. Teonna Monae Brown, 19, pleaded guilty to first-degree assault and a hate crime in the beating and was sentenced to five years in prison, plus three years of supervised probation. The other woman was charged as a juvenile and committed to a juvenile detention facility.
- June 2011 – Rosita Hernandez, a Cuban trans woman, was stabbed to death in Miami. In November 2011, Miguel Pavon was charged with first-degree murder after his DNA was matched with samples found in the victim's residence.
- June 5, 2011 – CeCe McDonald, a young African American trans woman, was attacked outside a tavern shortly after midnight in Minneapolis, Minnesota. CeCe fatally stabbed her attacker with a pair of scissors. She was subsequently convicted of manslaughter and jailed for 19 months in a men's prison.
- July 20, 2011 – Lashai Mclean, a 23-year-old African American trans woman, was shot to death in Northeast, Washington, D.C.
- August 11, 2011 – Camila Guzman, a Latina transgender woman, was found murdered in her apartment in East Harlem, Manhattan.
- September 8, 2011 – Cameron Nelson, a 32-year-old gay man, was attacked at his place of employment in Utah.
- October 11, 2011 – Shelley Hilliard, a black transgender teen who had been reported missing, had her burnt torso identified by police in Detroit. Her killer, 30-year-old Qasim Raqib, was sentenced on March 6, 2012, to 25–40 years in jail.
- November 15, 2011 – Danny Vega, a 58-year-old Asian-American gay man who worked as a hairdresser in Rainier Valley, Seattle, was beaten and robbed as he was taking a walk. The beating left Vega in a coma from which he later died.
- November 17, 2011 – Cassidy Nathan Vickers, a 32-year-old black transgender woman, died from a gunshot wound to the chest in Hollywood. Her killer, who is still unidentified, is also suspected of shooting and attempting to rob another black transgender woman on the same day.
- December 17, 2011 – Charlie Hernandez, a 26-year-old who was openly gay, was stabbed to death following a brawl that included anti-gay slurs that occurred with two men after he accidentally stepped on some sunglasses.
- December 24, 2011 – Dee Dee Pearson, a 31-year-old transgender woman, died from bullet wounds in Kansas City, Missouri. Kenyan L. Jones was charged with second-degree murder and armed criminal action. Jones told police he paid to have sexual relations with Pearson, believing her to be a cisgender woman, but hours after having sex with her, discovered she was not. Angered by what he considered to be a deception, he got a 9 mm caliber handgun, found Ms Pearson, and killed her. Jones was arrested on suspicion of her murder.
- December 29, 2011 – The body of Give Goines, a black 23-year-old trans woman who had been reported missing two weeks beforehand, was found in a scrapheap in New Orleans. An autopsy set that the time of her death as much as two days before her body was discovered and that she had been strangled.

==== 2012 ====
- January 21, 2012 – Crain Conaway, a 47-year-old African-American transgender woman, was found dead in her home in Oceanside, California. Tyree Paschall Monday was arrested in connection with her murder.
- February 2, 2012 – JaParker "Deoni" Jones, a 23-year-old African-American transgender woman, was stabbed in the head while waiting at a Metrobus stop in Washington, D.C.
- February 2012 – Cody Rogers, an 18-year-old teenager, was brutally assaulted and targeted with homophobic slurs at a party in Oklahoma after defending a female friend who was also attacked.
- March 8, 2012 – A gay African-American man was sexually and physically assaulted by two men in Corpus Christi, Texas. The victim was invited to an apartment, when Jimmy Garza and Ramiro Serrata Jr. physically attacked him over the course of three hours. The victim was also sodomized with a broom and threatened with a gun, until he was able to escape through an apartment window. Garza and Serrata Jr. were sentenced to fifteen years for their roles in the attack.
- March 24, 2012 – Several transgender and crossdressing people were shot at and robbed in Florida by a man, suspected to be De Los Santos. 23-year-old Tyrell Jackson was fatally wounded in the shooting, which also injured 20-year-old Michael Hunter.
- April 3, 2012 – Coko Williams, a black trans woman, was found murdered in East Detroit, Michigan. The homicide may have been related to Coko's involvement in sex work.
- April 16, 2012 – Paige Clay, 23, an African-American transgender woman, was found dead, with a bullet wound to her face in West Garfield Park, Chicago. The death was ruled as a homicide.
- April 21, 2012 – Eric Unger, a 23-year-old gay man living in Illinois, was attacked by a group of men on the way home from a party, while they shouted anti-gay epithets at him. The investigation is ongoing.
- May 11–12, 2012 – Lorena Escalera, a 25-year-old Latina transgender woman who performed under the name Lorena Xtravaganza, was found dead in her apartment in Bushwick after the building had been set ablaze.
- May 26, 2012 – Max Pelofske, a 21-year-old gay man, was beaten by a group of youths at a party in Kelsey Township, St. Louis County, Minnesota. Pelofske claims it was a hate crime, but police disagree.
- June 5, 2012 – Kardin Ulysse, a 14-year-old African-American, was attacked in the cafeteria of Roy Mann Junior High School in Brooklyn, New York, by another group of boys. He was called anti-gay slurs and sustained damage to the cornea of one of his eyes, leaving him blinded. Ulysse's parents sued New York City for failing to supervise its students properly and the city settled for $700,000 in 2016.
- June 22, 2012 – Mollie Judith Olgin, 19 years old, and her girlfriend, Mary Kristene Chapa, 18 years old, were sexually assaulted and shot in the head near Violet Andrews Park in Portland, Texas. Olgin died at the scene and Chapa survived. David Strickland has been charged with the murder of Olgin and sentenced to life.
- July 5, 2012 – Tracy Johnson, a 40-year-old African-American transgender woman, was found dead from gunshot wounds in Baltimore, Maryland.
- August 14, 2012 – Tiffany Gooden, a 19-year-old African-American transgender woman, was found murdered on the second floor of an abandoned building in Chicago. An autopsy verified that she had been stabbed to death. Notably, the body of Paige Clay, another young black trans woman, was discovered April the same year 3 blocks away from where Tiffany was found. The pair were known as friends.
- August 18, 2012 – Kendall Hampton, a 26-year-old African-American transgender woman, died of gunshot wounds. Eugene Carlos Dukes was arrested in early September for her murder, and indicted later that month.
- August 26, 2012 – Deja Jones, a 33-year-old African-American transgender woman, was shot to death in Miami. No arrest had been made.
- September 3, 2012 – The body of Kyra Cordova, a 27-year-old transgender woman, was found in a wooded area in Frankford, Philadelphia.
- October 15, 2012 – Janette Tovar, a 43-year-old transgender woman was murdered by her partner, Jonathan Kenney, according to police, who beat her and slammed her head into the concrete. He was later arrested for her murder.
- November 9, 2012 – Austin Head, a progressive community activist and openly gay man, was assaulted by brothers Jermon Barnes and Ernie Barnes in Phoenix, Arizona. Head was knocked unconscious during the attack and was hospitalized due to the multiple injuries he sustained. Both Barnes brothers were charged and convicted for their role in the attack.

==== 2013 ====
- March 1, 2013 – Sondra Scarber addressed a parent about her girlfriend's son being bullied at Seabourn Elementary School in Mesquite, Texas, and was beaten by him when he realized that she was a lesbian.
- May 18, 2013 – Mark Carson, a 32-year-old African-American gay man, was shot to death by another man who trailed and taunted him and a friend as they walked down the street in Greenwich Village, Manhattan. When the two friends ignored the assailant's questions, the man began yelling anti-gay slurs and asked one of them, "You want to die tonight?" Elliot Morales, 33, was arrested briefly after the shooting and charged with murder and weapons charges on May 19. According to police, Morales said he shot Carson because he was "acting tough". Morales pleaded not guilty, but on March 9, 2016, he was convicted by a Manhattan jury of murder as a hate crime. Morales was sentenced on June 14, 2016, to 40 years to life in prison.
- May 22, 2013 – Gabriel Fernandez, an eight-year-old boy, was tortured and murdered by his mother and her boyfriend because they believed the child to be gay. Prosecutor Jon Hatami detailed the acts allegedly committed by Isauro Aguirre and the boy's mother, Pearl Fernandez, who also faces trial. Hatami explained that the Palmdale couple beat Gabriel, bit him, burned him with cigarettes, whipped him, shot him with a B.B. gun, starved him, fed him cat litter, and kept him gagged and bound in a cubby hold closet until he was found on May 22, 2013, dying of blunt force trauma to the head. He died two days later in the hospital. The couple called first responders to treat Gabriel, but that was only in an attempt to mislead, the prosecutor said. In June 2018, Aguirre was sentenced to death and Fernandez was sentenced to life in prison without the possibility of parole.
- June 2, 2013 – Matthew Fenner was beaten and choked for hours by church members. He says the attacks took place "to break [him] free of the homosexual demons they so viciously despise".
- October 13, 2013 – Carmen Guerrero, a transgender woman sentenced to life in prison for the murder of her girlfriend Mary Perkins, was bound, gagged, tortured, and murdered by her cellmate, Miguel Crespo, at Kern Valley State Prison in California. Miguel Crespo was sentenced to death in 2019.
- November 4, 2013 – Sasha Fleischman, an agender 18-year-old, had their skirt set on fire while they were sleeping on an AC Transit bus in Oakland, California. Police arrested 16-year-old Richard Thomas and charged him with felony assault, with an enhancement of inflicting great bodily injury. Thomas admitted to police that he had started the fire and that he did it because he was "homophobic". On November 14, 2014, Thomas was sentenced to seven years in juvenile detention for his crime, but his sentence was reduced in 2015 to five years. The attack on Fleischman and their recovery were the subject of an article in the New York Times Magazine, which later became the basis for a related non-fiction book titled The 57 Bus.
- November 10, 2013 – Nicholas D. Forte, a 36-year-old gay man, was assaulted after leaving the Voyeur Nightclub in Philadelphia. One of the venue's bouncers, Miguel Maldonado, and Forte had argued before Forte left. Maldonado and another man, Matthew Morris, followed Forte down the road before one of the two punched him in the side of the head, knocking Forte to the ground, unconscious. Maldonado and Morris proceeded to assault Forte causing multiple facial fractures, breaking an eye socket and his nose, and breaking at least one rib. Morris and Maldonado were both convicted in February 2015. Forte stated they attacked because of his sexual orientation.
- December 31, 2013 – A fire was started in the stairway of a gay nightclub in Seattle, which was quickly extinguished. After suspect Musab Mohammaed Masmari had told a friend that "homosexuals should be exterminated", an informer from the Muslim community told the FBI Masamari may have also been planning terrorist attacks. The native of Benghazi, Libya, was arrested en route to Turkey. Masmari was sentenced to 10 years on federal arson charges.

==== 2014 ====
- March 1, 2014 – Jipsta, a well-known and openly gay white rapper, was the victim of a bias attack in a New York City subway station as he and his partner were celebrating their 10-year anniversary. The assailant hurled vicious homophobic slurs at the couple, and following a verbal disagreement, Jipsta was brutally beaten by the unidentified subject, resulting in multiple fractures to his face. As a result of the incident, Jipsta required surgery due to seven broken bones sustained to his nose and eye socket, which forced him to cease promotion of his sophomore album Turnt Up.
- March 6, 2014 – Britney Cosby, 24, and Crystal Jackson, 24, a lesbian couple, were murdered by Britney's father, James Larry Cosby. Britney was strangled and beaten to death. Crystal was also beaten and strangled, though a gunshot wound to her temple was the cause of death. James Cosby was sentenced to life in prison.
- June 1, 2014 – Ahmed Said, 27, and Dwone Anderson-Young, 23, were killed execution-style shortly after midnight in the Leschi neighborhood of Seattle shortly after they left a gay nightclub. Both victims were gay, and Ahmed was apparently lured by being contacted on Grindr, a social app popular with gay men. Anderson-Young was receiving a ride home from Ahmed Said. The case was soon investigated as a possible hate crime. Both Said and Anderson-Young were shot multiple times; Anderson-Young died inside Said's car, while Said died immediately outside. Suspect Ali Muhammad Brown has confessed to killing Said, Anderson-Young, and two men in Seattle and New Jersey, both of whom were not gay. Brown had previously been convicted of bank fraud and is believed to be in support of Muslim terrorists in Somalia. He told investigators that he was guided strictly by his faith, and that the killings were "just" because they were in retaliation for actions by the U.S. government in Iraq, Syria, and Afghanistan.
- October 18, 2014 – Tawnee Marie Baird, a 21-year-old woman was stabbed 46 times by her girlfriend, Victoria Mendoza.

==== 2015 ====
- February 1, 2015 – Taja DeJesus, 36, a trans woman, was found stabbed to death in the Bayview neighborhood of San Francisco, California.
- May 5, 2015 – Jonathan Snipes, 25, and Ethan York-Adams, 25, were the victim of a homophobic attack in a New York City restaurant. When two male patrons in the restaurant directed homophobic slurs towards the couple, Snipes confronted the patrons. The patrons then physically escalated their argument, where Snipes was pushed to the ground and repeatedly kicked. York-Adams and Snipes were then hit with a chair. Both suspects fled the restaurant, while the victims sustained multiple injuries.
- June 1, 2015 – Mercedes Williamson, a 17-year-old transgender woman studying to be a cosmetologist, was murdered in George County, Mississippi. In 2016, the Justice Department used the Matthew Shepard and James Byrd, Jr. Hate Crimes Prevention Act to bring criminal charges against a person for selecting a victim because of their gender identity for the first time. Joshua Vallum pleaded guilty in the case, stating that he used a stun gun to incapacitate her before stabbing and beating her to death all in an effort to keep fellow members of the Latin Kings from learning of their sexual relationship. He was sentenced to 49 years in 2017.
- July 18, 2015 – Kevyn Mines, a 31-year-old employee of Danny's Midnight Confessions, an adult store located in Center City, Pennsylvania, was shot in the back by a man who entered the store making homophobic comments. After initially leaving the store without incident, the man returned, asking about heterosexual merchandise, then shot the employee who attempted to lead him to that section of the store.
- October 4, 2015 – John Mateer, 19, was assaulted outside of a Penn State University frat house after Mateer revealed he was gay. The crime went viral across the internet after Mateer uploaded photos of his bruised and bloodied face to his Twitter profile.

==== 2016 ====
- February 15, 2016 – Anthony Gooden and Marquez Tolbert, experienced facial and bodily second and third-degree burns after Martin Luther Blackwell, 43, poured boiling water on them as they were sleeping. Gooden was comatose for two weeks, during his five-week hospitalization.
- April 29, 2016 – Steven Nelson a 49-year-old gay man, was assaulted by Kelly Schneider, 23, in a secluded wildlife area near Lake Lowell, Idaho. Scheinder kicked Nelson 20-30 times with steel-toed boots, after which he was robbed of his clothes, his credit cards and his car keys and left to die in the cold. Nelson was able to get up and walk to a nearby home and call for help. He was taken to Saint Alphonsus Hospital in Boise but died later that morning. Schneider was sentenced to life in prison, with the possibility of parole after 28 years. Three others were involved. While Schneider confessed to murdering Nelson because of Nelson's homosexuality, Jayson Lee Woods orchestrated the crime. Woods was sentenced to life in prison with parole possible after 23 years, and an additional five years for running a prostitution ring - of which Schneider had agreed to be a part. Kevin Tracy and Daniel Aragon Henkel waited in the trees nearby to 'assist' Schneider in the assault; Tracy was sentenced to six months in jail with ten years probation. Henkel was sentenced to a minimum of 4 years.
- June 12, 2016 – A massacre at the Orlando gay nightclub Pulse left 49 dead and 53 wounded. The gunman, 29-year-old Omar Mateen, was an American citizen of Afghan descent who pledged allegiance to the terrorist organization ISIS in a 9-1-1 call he made about the attack. ISIS also claimed responsibility for the attack. The incident is the largest attack targeting LGBTQ people in the US.
- July 23, 2016 – Dee Whigham, a 25-year-old African-American transgender woman employed as a nurse, was stabbed 119 times in a Jackson County, Mississippi hotel. Police arrested Dwanya Porche Hickerson, a 20-year-old sailor stationed at Keesler Air Force Base, for the murder. He pleaded guilty on July 20, 2017. During his plea, Hickerson admitted that he killed Whigham after they had sexual intercourse and Whigham informed him that she was transgender. Circuit Court Judge Robert Krebs accepted the DA's recommendation of 40 years for Whigham's murder as well as 8 years for the robbery of her person that night.
- July 29, 2016 – Levi Frerichs, a gay man, was attacked by a group of six teenagers as he was walking home in Chicago, Illinois. The teenagers noticed Freirichs and began to throw blows to his head, while taunting him with homophobic slurs.
- August 11, 2016 – Rae'Lynn Thomas, a 28-year-old transgender woman, was shot twice in front of her mother, and then beaten to death by James Allen Byrd, her mother's ex-boyfriend, in Columbus, Ohio. Byrd called her "the devil" and made transphobic comments towards her.
- September 7, 2016 – Michael Phillips was attacked after leaving his job at a gay bar. He and his husband say they have been targeted for their sexual orientation multiple times.
- November 11, 2016 – Patricia Wright and Charlotte Reed, a lesbian couple, and their adult son, Benny Diambu-Wright were murdered by Dana Rivers, a transgender woman, in East Oakland, California. Rivers was sentenced to life imprisonment without parole by Alameda County Superior Court Judge Scott Patton on June 14, 2023.

==== 2017 ====
- January 4, 2017 – The body of Mesha Caldwell, a 41-year-old African-American transgender woman, was found in Madison County, Mississippi with multiple gunshot wounds.
- March 5, 2017 – Two men were stabbed in Brooklyn, New York after they left a gay nightclub. James Thomas, 32, noticed the men waiting to patronize a nearby restaurant, and began to shout homophobic slurs. Thomas then slashed the first victim in the face, and stabbed the second victim in the torso and shoulder. A third man was threatened and pushed to the ground during the attack.
- May 20, 2017 – A lesbian woman, 24, was assaulted by Antoine Thomas on the New York City Subway. Thomas noticed that the woman boarded the train with her partner, and directed homophobic slurs towards them. Thomas then attacked the victim until she was unconscious. Due to the attack, the victim was subsequently hospitalized for a concussion, multiple deep cuts, and a broken eye socket.
- June 13, 2017 – The body of Josie Barrios, a 28-year-old transgender woman who performed with House of Merlot under the name Kimbella Rosé, was found with burn marks in Ithaca, New York near Cornell University, at the construction site of the Breazzano Family Center for Business Education. Michael Davis, Barrios' 47-year-old boyfriend, pleaded guilty to the murder and was sentenced to 25 years in prison in March 2018.
- June 25, 2017 – Ava Le'Ray Barrin, a 17-year-old African-American transgender woman, was killed in an altercation with Jalen Breon Brown, (Note: The news media coverage only lists the name "Jalen Breon Brown" for the shooter. While the media is known to have deadnamed Barrin, there is no such notation for Brown.) also an African-American transgender woman. Brown shot Barrin during their fight. Brown had been charged with murder, but in a May 2018 evidentiary hearing, Judge Eric Norris dismissed the murder charge, ruling that the shooting was self-defense. The media reporting on the incident sparked national conversation on proper use of gender in news reports and on deadnaming.
- July 5, 2017 – Davon Washington, a 26-year-old transgender woman of color, was struck by a vehicle in Washington, D.C. in a hit and run after she refused to give her phone number to the occupant of the vehicle. Washington was critically injured and required hospitalization. On July 12, DC police arrested Startwaune Anderson, 18. Anderson had stolen the car he struck Washington with earlier in the day. He pleaded guilty in November 2017 and was sentenced to 5 years in jail on January 30, 2018.
- July 31, 2017 – College Park, Georgia fire and rescue transported TeeTee Dangerfield, a 32-year-old transgender woman of color, to Grady Memorial Hospital, where she later died. She had been found in her car near an apartment complex. She had been shot 19 times in the abdomen and groin. Tyrone Kemp, 26, was arrested August 22 in Union City, Georgia. Kemp was acquitted on November 24, 2021, and filed suit November 21, 2023 against College Park police officer Kevin Pogorzelski, alleging violation of Kemp's Fourth and Fourteenth Amendment rights.
- August 28, 2017 – A gay man was beaten by thugs after they shouted homophobic slurs at him. He suffered a broken jaw from the attack.
- September 16, 2017 – Scout Schultz, a 21-year-old non-binary student at Georgia Tech, was shot and killed by officer Tyler Beck of the Georgia Tech police department. Schultz had approached the officers yelling for them to shoot while holding their arms downward and holding what officers at the time identified as a pocket knife. The university settled a wrongful death suit filed by Schultz's family for $1,000,000 after the Fulton County DA stated charges would not be filed against Beck.
- September 2017 – Ally Steinfeld, a transgender teenager, was stabbed to death and mutilated by three young people in Cabool, Missouri.
- October 31, 2017 – The body of Candace Towns, a 30-year-old African-American transgender woman, was found in Macon, Georgia. Towns had been shot in the face. Police arrested Horace Jamal Marsh for the crime on July 6, 2020. Marsh was also arrested in the Halloween 2017 shooting of Kithwe Steed – an unrelated incident – which went to trial in 2022. Marsh was convicted in that case and sentenced to 25 years in prison. The same gun was used in both incidents.
- November 8, 2017 – A 17-year-old gay teenager was allegedly attacked by 18-year-old Trevon Godbolt. Godbolt reportedly made the victim strip off his clothes and possessions, then beat him and took his clothes and cell phone. The attack took place near Edgewood Elementary School in Muskegon Heights, Michigan. Another man and two women were involved, one of whom recorded the attack on a cell phone. The video was later posted on Facebook. Godbolt pleaded no contest to the charges of unarmed robbery and unlawful imprisonment in 2018 and was sentenced to 43 months by Muskegon County Circuit Court Judge Annette Smedley, who noted she was taking the victim's statement of forgiveness into account in imposing the sentence.

==== 2018 ====
- January 2, 2018 – Blaze Bernstein, an openly gay Jewish college student, was stabbed more than 20 times. Samuel Woodward, an avowed neo-Nazi and member of the group Atomwaffen Division, was charged with his murder.
- March 7, 2018 – Ta'Ron 'Rio' Carson, a gay man, was fatally shot as he left the Aura nightclub in Kansas City, Missouri.
- March 28, 2018 – Amia Tyrae, a black transgender woman, was found dead in a motel room in Baton Rouge, Louisiana, with multiple gunshot wounds. Nevaa White, a friend of Tyrae's, said that Tyrae had lived her life as an openly trans woman since 2009. White also said Tyrae was bullied and "didn't have an easy life."
- May 25, 2018 – Roxana Hernández, a 33-year-old Latina transgender woman from Honduras who sought asylum in the U.S. at San Ysidro, died while in ICE custody. Initially, ICE detained her for deportation, citing a previous illegal entry and convictions in Texas for theft and prostitution. She had arrived on May 9. On May 15, she was moved from California to Milan, New Mexico and held at Cibola County Correctional Center. She was admitted to Cibola General Hospital on May 17. On May 25, she died in transit to Lovelace Medical Center in Albuquerque. ICE stated that Hernández had a heart attack and complications associated with HIV, but an independent autopsy showed that not only was Hernández's death preventable, but that she had been beaten with a baton while in restraints. Kamala Harris, Tom Udall, and Martin Heinrich – all then Senators – demanded a full report be presented to Congress as required within 60 days by law, a report that ICE had failed to produce a full six months after Hernández's death. As a result of Hernández's custodial death, her family sued CoreCivic, LaSalle Corrections Transport, Global Precision Systems, Management and Training Corporation, TransCor America, and the United States federal government.
- June 2, 2018 – Four gay men were chased by a mob of approximately twenty men following a Pride event in Salt Lake City, Utah.
- June 17, 2018 – Darnell Morgan, a black gay man, was attacked by five men while visiting Las Vegas, Nevada, for a relative's wedding.
- June 21, 2018 – Anthony Avalos, a ten-year old, succumbed to fatal abuse injuries in a hospital. When his mother Heather Barron and her boyfriend Kareem Leiva were subsequently arrested for Avalos' death, family relatives later revealed that Avalos expressed to his mother he, "liked boys and girls". Child welfare investigators discovered that Barron referred to Avalos with a homophobic slur, while Leiva stated he was "uncomfortable being around gay people".
- November 28, 2018 – A 20-year-old woman was assaulted on the New York City Subway by Allah Allasheed, following a brief kiss shared with another women. Allasheed engaged the victim with homophobic slurs, and later struck her. The victim suffered a fractured spine as a result of the attack.
- November 29, 2018 – Vincent Shaver and Charles Clements were followed and assaulted by multiple men outside of their home. Both men were beaten and Shaver suffered a punctured lung during the attack, due to being stabbed with a piece of broken glass.

==== 2019 ====
- January 6, 2019 – Dana Martin, a 31-year-old transgender woman, was found dead of a gunshot wound in Montgomery, Alabama.
- January 29, 2019 – Spencer Deehring and Tristan Perry, a gay couple, were assaulted by multiple men when leaving a gay club in Austin, Texas. The men directed homophobic slurs towards the couple, then the suspects began to punch Perry repeatedly. When Deehring attempted to defend his partner, he became the target of physical assault. Both victims were knocked unconscious during the attack, and were later hospitalized.
- February 17, 2019 – Sal Trejo, a gay man, was assaulted outside a bar in Salt Lake City. The assailant confronted Trejo and his friends outside the bar, asking Trejo if he was gay. When Trejo answered affirmatively, the man punched him. He also laid hands on a woman who was with Trejo. The group reacted and the assailant then pulled out a knife and threatened them with it before fleeing in his car. Carlo Alazo, a 22-year-old man from Florida, was arrested and charged with three crimes resulting from the incident.
- March 30, 2019 – Ashanti Carmon, a 27-year-old African-American transgender woman, was murdered in Prince George's County, Maryland. Police offered a $25,000 reward for information on the murder. A witness, Zoe Spears, came forward and gave a statement in a three-hour interview with police. She provided a name and a phone number, but the case remains unsolved.
- April 13, 2019 – Trevor Gray was viciously beaten at the house of Landon McCaa in Wayne County, Mississippi. Gray had been at the home with a group of others, many of them drinking, under the carport outside. Gray left for a few minutes and returned only to be punched repeatedly in the face by McCaa, who recorded the assault and later posted it on social media. McCaa and his friend, Toman Sion Brown, were both arrested in the incident. While Brown's involvement isn't on the recording, both he and McCaa were charged with assault. Though Gray is not LGBTQ, McCaa and Brown believed that he was and yelled epithets during the attack. Both Brown and McCaa pleaded guilty on April 9, 2021, each receiving a sentence of 15 years, but with 13 and a half suspended. They were also ordered to pay only $4,327 of restitution.
- April 2019 – An unnamed 26-year-old transgender woman was stabbed in Dallas, Texas. She survived the attack and was able to describe her assailant to police.
- May 9, 2019 – A 22-year-old transgender woman was shot in the leg at the Waffle House in Southaven, Mississippi. The bullet shattered her femur and she was sent to Regional One Health in Memphis, in serious condition. Police arrested Jimtarius Hampton and charged him with aggravated assault. One report stated that the weapon used was an AK-47. The assailant entered the Waffle House and began verbally harassing the victim, making anti-trans comments.
- May 18, 2019 – Muhlaysia Booker, a 22-year-old African-American transgender woman, was found dead near Tenison Park Golf Course in Dallas. She had been shot; Kendrell Lyles pleaded guilty to the murder in November 2023 and was sentenced to 48 years in prison. Her murder followed a brutal instance of mob violence following a minor traffic accident on April 12, 2019, in which someone offered one man $200 to assault Booker. Other men joined in, one of them stomping on her head. The incident was recorded and posted on social media. Edward Thomas was arrested and charged in the assault.
- May 28, 2019 – Four men were charged with targeting gay men for kidnapping and robbery by using the social app Grindr, in Dallas, Texas during 2017. All four men eventually pleaded guilty to various charges in individual cases from 2019 - 2021.
- June 1, 2019 – Chynal Lindsey, a 26-year-old African-American transgender woman, was found strangled in White Rock Lake in Texas. The timing of the murder in conjunction with other homicides of transgender women led to media speculation of a possible serial killer operating in the Dallas area. However, Dallas police arrested Ruben Alvarado for Lindsey's murder. He admitted to the murder in testimony, as an affirmative defense, claiming that Lindsey had straddled him while they were at the lake to have sex. Alvarado then stated that he discovered Lindsey was transgender, and she become aggressive when he confronted her, so he pinned her, took off his belt, and strangled her to death before dumping her body in the lake. The jury found Alvarado guilty of first-degree murder on November 10, 2021, and sentenced him to 37 years in prison on November 11, 2021.
- June 13, 2019 – Zoe Spears, a 23-year-old African-American transgender woman, was murdered in Fairmount Heights, Maryland. Though Spears had given police a statement that she had witnessed the murder of Ashanti Carmon, Prince George's County police would not confirm any relation between the incidents. Detectives arrested Gerardo Thomas and charged him with first-degree murder. Though Thomas initially stated he had nothing to do with the murder, his attorney argued in court that Thomas had feared for his life. His trial was postponed due to COVID but he pleaded guilty on September 9, 2020, and was sentenced by Maryland Circuit Court Judge Dorothy Engel on November 13, 2020, to 40 years for the charge of second-degree murder, with 20 years suspended as well as credited for time already served, and 5 years for the use of a gun in the commission of a crime of violence. The sentences are concurrent.
- June 16, 2019 – Karl Craven and Braden Brecht, a gay couple, were assaulted and robbed by multiple men in Washington, D.C. Following some assailants directing homophobic slurs towards the couple, the group decided to attack Brecht. Craven suffered a bruise on his head, while Brecht suffered multiple cuts, bruises, a chipped tooth, and a cut lip. Additionally, the assailants stole Craven's wallet and Brecht's phone.
- July 29, 2019 – A gay man was attacked by three people in Racine, Wisconsin. The victim suffered multiple bruises throughout his body and a broken jaw. The severity of the broken jaw injury led to the removal of all the victim's teeth.
- August 4, 2019 - Jordan Cofer, a transgender man, was killed in the 2019 Dayton Shooting, committed by his own brother.
- August 7, 2019 – Chanel Wortham, also known as CoCo Wortham or Miss Coco, a 44-year-old African-American transgender woman originally from Kansas City, Kansas, was shot in a homeless encampment in Dallas. She was pronounced dead upon arrival at the hospital.
- August 2019 – Pebbles LaDime "Dime" Doe, a 24-year-old transgender woman was shot and killed by Daqua Ritter in a rural area of Allendale County. During the four-day trial, federal prosecutors alleged Ritter was upset there were rumors out in the community about his sexual relationship with Doe, according to the release.
- September 13, 2019 – Pol' Atteu, a gay fashion designer, was attacked at a charity show he and husband Patrik Simpson hosted at St. John's Cathedral in Los Angeles to benefit Make-A-Wish. Jesus Rodolfo Zepeda attacked Atteu because the designer had removed his daughter from the show, yelling homophobic slurs during the assault. Zepeda was sentenced in April 2024 to a five-year suspended sentence in state prison, and only required to spend four days in county jail, for which he was credited with time served.
- October 13, 2019 – Michael Dozon, a gay inmate at Bucks County Correctional in Doylestown, Pennsylvania, was punched, kneed, and kicked in the head by another inmate, Edward F. Gosner. Gosner made homophobic comments leading up to and during the incident. Gosner was sentenced to seven years for the assault; the conviction is under appeal.
- December 16, 2019 – An arsonist burned the drop-in office of SisTers PGH, a transgender resource center led by black and transgender people, in Pittsburgh, Pennsylvania.
- December 21, 2019 – An unnamed 37-year-old gay man was groped by 75-year-old John Kuhlman while in the gay bar Soho in Ferndale, MI. When the victim's friend told Kuhlman to stop, Kuhlman punched him, then tried to pay the first man to have sex with him. As employees tried to escort Kuhlman from the premises, he began punching them, leading to a brawl throughout the bar.
- December 24, 2019 – Kevin Bacon, a 25-year-old gay hairdresser, was murdered after meeting up with Mark David Latunski via Grindr. When police arrived at Latunski's Bennington Township, MI home, they found Bacon's body in the basement, hanging upside down. Latunski had already eaten some of Bacon's remains. Latunski was sentenced to life imprisonment.

=== 2020–2026 ===
==== 2020 ====
- February 11, 2020 – Shakena Jefferson, a 42-year-old African-American lesbian woman, Clive Khouri, an African-American man, and a second unnamed man were all shot in southwest Miami-Dade county. ATVs surrounded the car in which Khouri and his male friend sat, then the ATV riders opened fire after possibly seeing the two men kiss. Jefferson was shot in the head by a stray bullet, which was able to be removed. Khouri was grazed in the head, and his male friend was in critical condition.
- February 24, 2020 – Alexa Negrón Luciano, also known as Neulisa Luciano Ruiz, a 29-year-old transgender homeless woman, was murdered in Toa Baja, Puerto Rico. Prior to her body being found, three men saw her standing on the side of the road and began harassing her, then assaulted her with a paint gun. Her assailants admitted to recognizing her from transphobic social media posts made following her use of a women's restroom at a McDonald's on February 23, targeting her because of those posts. Two of the three assailants posted recordings of the assault on social media, deleting the footage after Luciano's body was found. No arrests have been made in connection with the murder.
- May 13, 2020 – Kristian Rouse, an 18-year-old African-American transgender man, was found brutally beaten in his apartment in Bakersfield, California. He spent one month on a ventilator in ICU and was transferred to a long-term care facility. He had been strangled and both lungs had collapsed.
- June 1, 2020 – Keyonna Kamry, known online as Iyanna Dior, a 21-year-old African-American transgender woman, was beaten in a Saint Paul, Minnesota convenience store. The incident, captured on video, showed more than a dozen men involved in the assault. Saint Paul police noted that the footage had been mislabeled online and in media reports as having occurred at a gas station in Minneapolis. In the video, the attackers use homophobic slurs and repeatedly misgender Dior.
- June 1, 2020 – During the George Floyd protests, on May 30, an LGBTQ bar in Raleigh, North Carolina, was vandalized with a white supremacist symbol. Tim Lemuel, the owner of the Ruby Deluxe bar, returned to his business the following evening to deter vandals and to offer first aid to protesters who had been tear-gassed or pepper-sprayed. Just after midnight, the police ordered Lemuel off his business rental property, firing warning shots at him and his staff.
- June 8, 2020 – Dominique "Rem'mie" Fells, a 27-year-old African-American transgender woman, was murdered in Philadelphia. Her body was found in the Schuylkill River, her legs severed. Akhenaton Jones has been arrested and charged in the murder. He has alleged police misconduct during the investigation, and was scheduled for trial on February 12, 2024.
- June 9, 2020 – Riah Milton, a 25-year-old African-American transgender woman, was lured to a park in Liberty Township, Butler County, Ohio by Tyree Cross, Kaleb Tooson, and an unnamed 14-year-old girl who tried to rob her and steal her car. They assaulted her before Tooson shot Milton, and also himself. Both Cross and Tooson pleaded guilty and were sentenced to 15 years to life.
- June 20, 2020 – Holden White, an 18-year-old gay man, was assaulted by Chance Seneca in Lafayette, LA. White was choked to the point of unconsciousness by Seneca with a cord. Then, Seneca mutilated White's throat with the tip of a knife, and cut White's wrists. White survived the attack, and criticized authorities for delaying in pursuing hate crime charges. In part, the delay in the hate crime proceedings was due to Seneca alleging that because he is gay too, he can't commit a hate crime on another gay man, saying that it was "intragroup" violence instead. The argument was rejected by the court when it sentenced him to 45 years in prison in January 2023.
- June 25, 2020 – Brayla Stone, a 17-year-old African-American transgender woman, was found fatally shot in a car in Sherwood, Arkansas. Trevone Hayse Miller pleaded guilty to first-degree murder in the case in exchange for a 50-year prison sentence. The two had been involved in a sexual relationship at the time, and Miller stated he murdered Stone to keep that from being revealed.
- June 30, 2020 – Merci Richey, a 22-year-old African-American transgender woman, was found dead of multiple gunshot wounds in a parking lot in Dallas, Texas. Police initially arrested Angelo Walker, but have since dropped the case as he neither matched the original description of the murderer provided by a witness nor did his DNA match that collected by police. The person who initially told police Walker committed the crime was a better match to the first witness' description. Police have yet to locate that individual again.
- July 1, 2020 – Shakie Peters, a 32-year-old African-American transgender woman, was found dead of gunshot wounds in Amite City, Louisiana. She was last seen in the company of Lynette Muse and Christopher Causey, who were indicted by a St. Helena Parish grand jury for the murder. Causey was acquitted in a jury trial in 2022. Muse pleaded no contest to manslaughter. She was given a 15-year suspended sentence and ordered to serve three years probation instead.
- July 3, 2020 – Bree Nuk Black, a 27-year-old African-American transgender woman, was murdered on a street filled with people in Pompano Beach, Florida. Despite offering a $10,000 reward, the Broward County Sheriff's office still had not received any viable tips from witnesses two years after the murder.
- July 5, 2020 – Cherry Bush, a homeless 48-year-old transgender woman, was shot to death in Los Angeles. Her alleged killer has been charged with a hate crime.
- July 13, 2020 – The body of Marilyn Cazares, a 22-year-old Latina transgender woman, was found inside an abandoned house in Brawley, California. Police had been called to the scene in response to a burning couch. According to family members, Cazares' death was a result of stabbing.
- August 6, 2020 – A man was arrested for verbally harassing and physically assaulting patrons of LGBTQ establishments in Madison, Wisconsin. A 34-year-old victim was left bleeding as a result of one of the attacks, while a 41-year-old victim was left with injuries to his arm.
- August 16, 2020 – Eden Estrada, Jaslene Whiterose, and Joslyn Flawless, all transgender women, were attacked by three men around 2 A.M. while on the Hollywood Walk of Fame. The attack was livestreamed while it occurred, and police did acknowledge it as a hate crime.
- October 4, 2020 – Daniela Hernandez, a 42-year-old Latina transgender woman was attacked while sitting in MacArthur Park in Los Angeles. She reported being surrounded by a group of four or five men, who used slurs before stabbing her, slashing her throat, and fleeing. A 24-year-old man, Donoban Fonseca, was arrested and charged in the attack. He was also charged for two attacks on another, unidentified, transgender woman in the same park on August 21 and September 1, 2020.
- November 17, 2020 – Yunieski "Yuni" Carey, a Cuban transgender woman and model was stabbed by her partner, Ygor Arruda Souza. The stabbing was carried out on Carey's face and neck with a knife and fork, while she was resting in her bed after a day of work. Later, Arrudasouza confessed to the crime and that he stabbed Carey out of "an attack of jealousy" since she was going to break up the relationship.
- November 20, 2020 – Asia Jynaé Foster, a 22-year-old African-American transgender woman, was found dead from multiple gunshot wounds in Houston, Texas on the Transgender Day of Remembrance. Jemal Tyrelle Richards was arrested by the Houston PD in connection with the murder in October 2022.
- December 22, 2020 – The body of Timothy Paul Allen, a 65-year-old gay man employed as a pianist and delivery driver, was found on December 23 in Dallas. Police stated that he died on December 22 after making a delivery; he was found shot in his car. On February 5, 2021, Tristin Howard, 17, and Qaulin Curlin, 18, were arrested and charged with capital murder. Howard pleaded guilty to murder and was sentenced to 35 years on March 23, 2023. Curlin pleaded to aggravated robbery and was sentenced to 10 years on August 11, 2023.

==== 2021 ====
- January 11–12, 2021 – New Jersey inmate Rae Rollins, a 25-year-old transgender woman, was one of the many women physically assaulted during the events of January 11–12 at Edna Mahan Correctional Facility for Women. In a lawsuit filed in March, Rollins stated that on February 18, while she was being readied for transport, she requested a specific officer have no involvement. Rollins' suit stated that she suffered a concussion after being thrown into a wall directly following the request. After the suit was filed, Rollins was transferred to the State Prison in Trenton, the first known female inmate (Note: As the later case of Demi Minor showed, at least one other transgender woman in the care of the NJ DOC has been transferred to a men's facility.) in a known men's incarceration facility in New Jersey. After public backlash, the state moved Rollins again, this time transferring her to a women's facility in Pennsylvania.
- January 30–31, 2021 – Kaylie M. Harris, a 21-year-old lesbian woman holding the rank of private first class (PFC) in the U.S. Army where she served as a military police officer (MP) with the 673rd Security Forces Squadron, was raped by an unnamed U.S. Air Force airman after publicly stating her sexual orientation on Facebook. Though her rapist was ordered not to have contact with her after she filed a report, he was not confined, and they were both assigned the same duty on the Anchorage, AK base. On May 2, Harris took her own life.
- March 11, 2021 – A transgender woman was attacked by Johnny Moreno, 23, with a skateboard in Costa Mesa, California. Moreno repeatedly hit the victim with his skateboard, and utilized homophobic slurs throughout the attack. Subsequently, Moreno threatened a passerby who called the police for assistance. Following the attack, Moreno was charged with assault with hate crime enhancement.
- March 18, 2021 – The body of Aidelen Evans, a 24-year-old African-American transgender woman, was discovered in Port Arthur, Texas. Her family had last seen her in February 2021. As the investigation unfolded, the case was transferred to the Beaumont PD.
- March 20, 2021 – A 32-year-old transgender woman was stabbed during an attempted sexual assault in Philadelphia, Pennsylvania.
- March 22, 2021 – A gunman fired into a home of an unidentified victim with the intent to kill in Basin, Montana. The indictment for John Russell Howard includes that he wanted to, "get rid of the lesbians [and] gays."
- April 23, 2021 – Iris Santos, a 22-year-old African-American transgender woman, was shot outside a Chick-fil-A in Montrose, Houston. The police have admitted that the crime does not appear to have robbery as a motive as nothing was taken. Crime Stoppers offered a $5,000 reward for information leading to the killer's capture.
- May 11, 2021 – The body of Poe Black, also known as Legion and Oliver Jackson, a 21-year-old mixed indigenous transgender non-binary person, was found, stabbed multiple times, in the Coachella Canal in Slab City, an unincorporated area of Niland, California.
- May 19, 2021 – The body of James Allen White, a 55-year-old gay man, was found on the campus of Paul Quinn College in Dallas. He had been missing since October 22, 2020.
- May 27, 2021 – Tristen Torrez, 14, was attacked when he wore a pride flag during the last day of classes at Defiance Middle School in Defiance, Ohio. The assailant threw water at Torrez, who was sitting with friends, then proceeded to choke and beat him. As a result of the attack, Torrez suffered minor injuries.
- June 12, 2021 – Tierramarie Lewis, a 36-year-old African-American transgender woman, was shot in the Fairfax neighborhood of Cleveland, Ohio. Police had her transported to the hospital, where she died from the gunshot wound.
- June 19, 2021 – April Burch, Krystal Cox, and two other families who had items visible outside their homes in Boone, IA supporting the LGBTQ community found handwritten notes taped to their doors telling them to "burn that gay flag". In Burch's case, a note was also taped to the building she rents as a community space, found by the building's owner on June 16, which included additional homophobic slurs. 25-year-old Robert Clark Geddes was arrested on June 22. He was convicted with a hate crime enhancement.
- July 5, 2021 – A gay man was brutally attacked after being lured on a date through Grindr by Daniel Andrew McGee in Eugene, Oregon. The victim suffered from a partially missing scalp, and was hospitalized as a result of the attack. McGee was charged with a hate crime as a result of his attack.
- July 17, 2021 – Taya Ashton, a 20-year-old African-American transgender woman, was murdered in her apartment in Suitland, Maryland by her boyfriend, DeAllen Price when he learned that she was transgender. Price pleaded guilty to the charge of second-degree murder and using a firearm in a crime of violence in October 2023. The judge sentenced Price to 60 years in prison on January 24, 2024, with 12 of those years suspended.
- July 20, 2021 – A transgender teenager was assaulted in a park by Travis Crawford in La Crosse, Wisconsin. While at the park with their partner, who is also transgender, the victim was approached by Crawford. The suspect directed homophobic slurs towards them, then proceeded to punch and kick the victim.
- August 6, 2021 – An unidentified, 31-year-old gay man was attacked at his home in Pompano Beach, Florida by four (Note: Charges were only brought against three of the family. Vladyslav Makarenko, originally thought to be the fourth assailant, provided evidence he was not in the area at the time of the incident. Charges were not brought against a fifth suspect as the Broward County State Attorney's office felt the likelihood of conviction was low.) members of the Makarenko family, leaving him blind. The Makarenko family accused the man of "making" the youngest son gay; the suspects were not charged until 2022.
- August 13, 2021 – Kylen Schulte and Crystal Turner, a married lesbian couple were killed by gunshot wounds by Adam Pinkusiewicz, the motive for the murders is unknown.
- September 2, 2021 – Two unidentified men were brutally assaulted in a Bushwick, Brooklyn bodega by Christopher Clemente and Johnathan Carter. Both victims were hospitalized for multiple stab wounds and collapsed lungs.
- September 20, 2021 – Justin Wayne Dixon, a 30-year-old gay man, was shot in Oak Lawn, Dallas in what police believe was a robbery. He died at the scene.
- September 30, 2021 – Kiér Laprí Kartier, a 21-year-old African-American transgender woman, was found unresponsive, with a gunshot wound, in a car in Arlington, Texas. She was transported to Arlington Memorial Hospital; she died from her injuries.
- October 24, 2021 – Charlotte Osieczanek, a transgender woman, was attacked by three men during her late night shift at a convenience store. Osieczanek suffered a broken nose, shoulder, and orbital bones as a result of the attack, in addition to bodily bruising and abrasions. The three men were eventually charged for their roles in the attack.
- November 2, 2021 – Jenny de Leon, a Latina transgender woman, was found murdered in Tampa, Florida. de Leon was a frequent attendee of local PFLAG meetings.

==== 2022 ====
- February 17, 2022 – A 60-year-old gay man was tied up and assaulted with a wrench by Ethan Dickerson, his neighbor. Dickerson cited the victim's sexuality as the reason for the assault.
- March 8, 2022 – Four teens from New Ulm were arrested for disorderly conduct after firing a SplatRBall SRB400 at the bus transporting the basketball team from St. Peter High School following the basketball game. They followed the bus in their cars and twice swerved in front of the bus, forcing the driver to brake suddenly to avoid collision. The incident followed several games in which the New Ulm students made harassing homophobic comments to Alex Bosacker, an 18-year-old gay man at St. Peter, at multiple games. Bosacker was assaulted during several games on the court as one of the New Ulm players repeatedly pinched him hard enough to leave multiple bruises on his body.
- March 19, 2022 – A 22-year-old man was attacked while riding a NYC subway train. The suspect repeatedly spat on the victim, then began to assault the victim when they tried to move. Police stated that the assailant used a homophobic slur during the assault.
- March 19, 2022 – A man was stabbed in the abdomen after leaving a convenience store in Las Vegas. Dontay Gray confessed during questioning, stating that he had purchased the knife only an hour before. Gray had been watching the victim while he was shopping in the company of another man. Gray defined himself as "incredibly homophobic" and stated that if released, he intended to murder LGBTQ individuals.
- April 2, 2022 – Ariyanna Mitchell, a 17-year-old trans girl, was shot and killed at a party in Hampton, Virginia, allegedly by Jimmy Leshawn Williams, with an assault rifle. A witness testified that Mitchell was shot after Williams asked if she was a "boy or a girl".
- April 17, 2022 – James Garcia, a gay man, was attacked while walking his dog by Maurice Charles, 36 in Fort Lauderdale, Florida. As a result of the attack, Garcia had to receive ten stitches.
- April 26, 2022 – An unidentified individual threw a rock through the front door of the Pride Center VT office. As of April 2022 the incident remains unsolved and was being investigated as a hate crime.
- May 26, 2022 – DeeDee Hall, a 47-year-old African-American transgender woman died while in police custody in Dallas. Police were responding to reports of a person having a mental health emergency; Hall's family later reported that she suffered from what they referred to as "bipolar schizophrenia". While police initially attempted to calm Hall, when she began to disrobe, the officers used force to restrain Hall - including placing a spit hood on her, insisted on using male pronouns to address her, and made jokes as she repeatedly told them she was having difficulty breathing. Hall was pronounced DOA when the ambulance eventually arrived at Baylor University Hospital.
- June 15, 2022 – Brazil Johnson, a 28-year-old African-American transgender woman, was found shot dead in Milwaukee, Wisconsin.
- July 3, 2022 – Noah Ruiz, a 20-year-old transgender man, was assaulted by multiple men while camping in Camden, Ohio. Ruiz was advised to use the women's restroom at a campground site, despite identifying as male. While in the bathroom, a woman angrily confronted Ruiz, and left the bathroom. When Ruiz later exited the bathroom, three men approached Ruiz and proceeded to assault him.
- July 20, 2022 – Keshia Chanel Geter, a 26-year-old African-American transgender woman was fatally shot at a Knights Inn in Augusta, GA. Jaquarie Allen, a 22-year-old man, was charged in the murder the next day.
- July 22, 2022 – Corinna Bendel-Sac's Lake in the Hills, IL UpRising Bakery and Cafe was vandalized by 25-year-old Joseph Collins after Brendel-Sac announced that the bakery would be hosting a drag show on July 23. The bakery, its employees, and even its patrons had been repeatedly harassed in the weeks prior to the vandalism, resulting in lost revenue. Combined with the property damage, Bendel-Sac was forced to close her business on May 31, 2023. Collins was charged with a hate crime.
- July 25, 2022 – Hayden Davis, a 28-year-old African-American transgender woman was fatally shot in Detroit. Witnesses claimed she jumped from a vehicle and her murderer shot her multiple times while she attempted to flee.
- July 30, 2022 – Christian Peacock, a 17-year-old gay man, was assaulted outside his home in Sandy, Utah. His assailant delivered a single blow to Peacock's head, resulting in a concussion and swelling of the brain. The assailant had exited his vehicle alongside another teenage boy, both of them making homophobic remarks, before assaulting Peacock. The assailant was charged with simple assault with a hate crime enhancement and was sentenced on October 5, 2022, the first such sentencing for a juvenile in Utah.
- August 27, 2022 – Dede Ricks, a 33-year-old African-American transgender woman from Ohio was fatally shot in Detroit. Deontae Antoine Close, a 31-year-old African-American man, was arrested the same day and charged in connection to the murder.
- August 29, 2022 – Regina Allen, a 35-year-old African-American transgender woman, was shot and killed in Milwaukee, Wisconsin. On May 28, 2024, Clayton Hubbird pleaded guilty to first-degree reckless homicide.
- September 22, 2022 – A 13-year-old student of Rippon Middle School in Prince William County, Virginia was charged with assault and a hate crime after he forcibly attempted to remove another classmate's face mask while using a homophobic slur.
- October 8, 2022 – A transgender woman working at the Boise Public Library's main branch was physically assaulted near Julia Davis Park in Boise, ID by a man using a homophobic slur. A security guard followed the assailant, who then tried to hit the guard with his car as he fled. On October 12, the same assailant yelled an anti-gay threat at two women before driving his car toward them. He did not him them, colliding with another car instead before he fled the scene. Matthew Lehigh, 31, was arrested for the incidents the same afternoon. Lehigh confessed to and was charged with arson in the burning of an LGBTQ flag at the home of Brett Perry and John Michael Schert on October 5, 2022. He likewise confessed to breaking the window of The Community Center, an LGBTQ organization in Boise, on October 3. On June 15, 2023, Lehigh pleaded guilty to two federal hate crime charges. He was sentenced to 37 months in prison on November 2, 2023.
- November 19–20, 2022 – A mass shooting at a gay bar in Colorado Springs, Colorado, left five people dead and 25 injured. Anderson Lee Aldrich pleaded guilty for the shooting at Club Q, and was sentenced to 55 life sentences without parole as well as a 190-year prison term by US District Judge Charlotte N. Sweeney on June 18, 2024.
- December 19, 2022 – A 52-year-old man was physically assaulted and shoved from behind into a car in the street by a member of the Guardians of Divinity when he had asked the group to stop their actions. The group was present inside the vestibule of the apartment building of Councilman Erik Bottcher. The victim of assault was one of Bottcher's neighbors in the building. Bottcher's own apartment was vandalized during the incident.

==== 2023 ====
- January 18, 2023 – The body of KC Lee Johnson, a 27-year-old transgender woman, was found on the banks of the Savannah River in Georgia. Johnson had been reported missing on January 14. William Haven Hicks was arrested for Johnson's kidnapping and subsequent murder.
- February 7, 2023 – The body of DeAndre Matthews, a 19-year-old African-American gay man studying criminal justice at SUNY Broome Community College, was found on the tracks in a freight train yard in Flatbush with a bullet wound to the head and having been burned. His lungs showed signs of smoke inhalation. 19-year-old Isiah Baez and 24-year-old Remy McPrecia have been charged in the murder.
- February 20, 2023 – Security cameras recorded a woman setting fire to a Pride flag hanging on the exterior of SoHo bistro Little Prince. 30-year-old Angelina Cando was arrested and charged with arson, criminal mischief, and reckless endangerment as a hate crime.
- February 26, 2023 – Cashay Henderson, a 33-year-old African-American transgender woman, was found shot dead in her home in Milwaukee, Wisconsin, which had been set on fire. Milwaukee police charged Cordell Howze with the murder and arson. He was found guilty on June 10, 2024.
- March 25, 2023 – Aimenn Penny, a member of White Lives Matter, threw molotov cocktails at the Community Church of Chesterland in Chesterland, Ohio, scorching its front door. In October 2023 he pleaded guilty to attempting to burn down the church, because they had planned to host two drag shows.
- April 5, 2023 – A 44-year-old man was punched and stabbed in Hell's Kitchen by a group shouting homophobic invective.
- April 8, 2023 – A gay couple was attacked in Times Square, requiring medical treatment at Mount Sinai. One of the couple stated that there were at least four assailants, and that no one stopped to help them. He also stated that the attackers shouted homophobic invective during the attack. One of the men required a metal plate to be inserted into his shattered jaw.
- April 2023 – A gay patron in and Ulster County, NY bar was physically assaulted and threatened with a box cutter by 31-year-old Shayne Wilber of Woodstock. Wilber shouted homophobic slurs at the victim and admitted in his plea that he attacked on the basis of the victim's sexual orientation.
- June 1, 2023 – Ashia Davis, a 34-year-old African-American transgender woman was fatally shot in Woodward Inn in Detroit. An 18-year-old, Carlos Lamar Scotland, was arrested and charged with first degree murder, among other charges, on March 12, 2024.
- June 4, 2023 – A patron in line to enter Fountain Haus in Kansas City, MO, an LGBTQ-friendly venue, was shot with a BB gun. According to an e-mail sent by Haus' manager to other local businesses, the shooter took aim at the entire line waiting to enter the venue.
- June 17, 2023 – Josilyn Ruiz and Brandy Escamilla, a married lesbian couple, were shot and killed in a mass shooting near Gorge Amphiteatre in Grant County, Washington while attending Beyond Wonderland. Three others were injured by alleged shooter U.S. Army Spc. James M. Kelly, including his girlfriend. Police injured Kelly when apprehending him. Early reports stated that Kelly informed police he had partaken of psychedelic mushrooms beforehand. As of June 17, 2024, Kelly is still detained in the Grant County jail.
- June 18, 2023 – Michael Drennan and Matthew Kisner were attacked when disembarking the New Mexico Rail Runner in Albuquerque with their young daughter on Father's Day. 26-year-old Jordan Salazar hurled homophobic slurs at all three of them, chased them as they left the train, and hit one of the two men with a metal broomstick.
- June 30, 2023 – Jacob Williamson, an 18-year-old transgender man was mutilated and murdered. Williamson was last seen leaving his job with a man who he had been talking to online for around a month. They were reportedly going on a date to an amusement park several hours away. His body was finally recovered near a road on July 4.
- July 8, 2023 – Greg Breidenbach, a gay man, was attacked by two men who shouted slurs at him. The attack left him with broken bones in his left eye socket, left sinus cavity and left cheek.
- July 28, 2023 – Jasmine Adams, a 35-year-old African-American bisexual woman, was assaulted with mace, dragged by her hair, and kicked in the head by a male employee of West Brighton Deli Grocery & Grill when attempting to purchase marijuana. The employee called Adams a transvestite before the assault, and though he has since been fired, the store has reportedly refused to identify him to police.
- July 29, 2023 – O'Shae Sibley, a 28-year-old gay man, was stabbed and later died outside a gas station in Brooklyn, New York. The suspect responsible for the stabbing was identified as a 17-year-old, who turned himself in to police custody on August 4, 2023, and was later charged with second-degree murder as a hate crime.
- August 17, 2023 – A 22-year-old woman was groped, then punched, by a man who made homophobic comments in a Brooklyn subway.
- August 18, 2023 – Laura Ann Carleton, a store owner in Lake Arrowhead, California and LGBTQ ally, was shot to death, allegedly by Travis Ikeguchi, who took issue with a pride flag being displayed at her business.
- August 25, 2023 – A 23-year-old woman was choked and punched on the Q-train in New York by a man using homophobic language. The alleged assailant, Richard Taylor, pleaded not guilty. The assault was charged as a hate crime.
- August 28, 2023 – A 52-year-old woman was punched by a stranger who directed homophobic slurs while jogging in Manhattan, New York.
- September 15, 2023 – A 72-year-old man was attacked by four individuals in Manhattan, who punched him, kicked him, and broke his jaw while yelling homophobic invective.
- October 29, 2023 – A student at UCLA was shot just under his eye by a man wielding a BB gun and yelling a homophobic slur from the back seat of a white four-door sedan.
- October 30, 2023 – Firefighters in Decatur, GA responded to the scene of the Blair Building, a structure on the National Register of Historic Places which houses numerous medical providers, including gender-affirming care clinic QMed. The arson is being investigated by the FBI as a hate crime.
- November 14, 2023 – Friends Amiri Reid, a transgender woman and Kejuan Richardson, a gay man, both 21 were shot in the head while driving around their home city of Toledo, Ohio.
- November 26, 2023 – The body of Bernardo Pantaleon, a 30-year-old gay man was found near a Phoenix park. Pantaleon was tortured, murdered and mutilated. The suspects of his murder also sent photos of his mutilated body to his family.
- November 26, 2023 – Three women, identified as two lesbians and one transgender, were attacked when leaving an event in Wynwood, FL. One of the women was punched until she lost consciousness. The assailants had yelled anti-lesbian comments at the group before physically assaulting them.
- November 29, 2023 – Savannah Ryan Williams, a 38-year-old transgender woman, was found dead of a gunshot wound to her head. Damarean Kaylon Bible confessed at the Hennepin County jail that he had killed Williams in central Minneapolis after they had sexual intercourse. He was charged with second-degree murder and scheduled for a hearing on January 9, 2024.
- December 18, 2023 – James Pence was falsely arrested for "causing a disturbance" after St. Louis, MO police crashed their SUV into the bar he co-owns with his husband in Carondelet, Bar:PM, when the couple came down from their upstairs apartment to see what had happened. The arrest occurred after Pence questioned the officer's intention to leave the scene without filing a report. Another officer arrived on the scene and arrested Pence's husband, co-owner Chad Morris, within 22 seconds of his arrival for "assaulting an officer". Morris left police custody with a black eye, scratches on his face, and severe bruising, as reported by his attorney, "all across" his body. A lawsuit filed on May 31, 2024, states that Morris was beaten by police when he followed the officer who was taking Pence down a gangway in handcuffs.
- December 24, 2023 – Amber Minor, a 40-year-old African-American transgender woman was found fatally shot in a driveway in Raytown, MO.

==== 2024 ====
- January 1, 2024 – Marcos Lugo / Kitty Monroe, a 43-year-old Latine gender-fluid (Note: The HRC article cites an interview from 2023 in claiming that Marcos Lugo / Kitty Monroe identified as transgender; however, his/her sister spoke with The Daily Beast in 2024, which uses the term "gender-fluid". As it is the more recent, that identifier has been used here.) homeless person, who used both his/her birth name Marcos and the name Kitty and used pronouns of both genders, was killed in a hit and run. A couple pistol-whipped him/her and then ran over him/her with their truck.
- January 26, 2024 – Sasha Williams, a 36-year-old transgender woman was stabbed and killed in Las Vegas. 20-year-old Hassan Howard has been arrested for the crime.
- February 2, 2024 – África Parrilla García, a 25-year-old African-American transgender homeless woman was murdered in Santurce, San Juan, Puerto Rico. She was shot multiple times, and it has been indicated she may have been employed as a sex worker.
- February 2, 2024 – John Walter Lay, a 52-year-old gay man was shot while he was walking his dog in West Dog Park in Tampa, Florida.
- February 7, 2024 – Nex Benedict, a 16-year-old non-binary student was beaten by three younger girls in the girls' restroom at Owasso High School, leading to their death. According to their (Note: Benedict used they/them and he/him pronouns. This article uses they/them pronouns for consistency.) mother and friends, they had experienced bullying from students due to their gender identity for more than a year before their death.
- February 26, 2024 – Reyna Hernandez, a 54-year-old Latina transgender woman businessowner went missing in Renton, WA. Her body was found on March 8, 2024, in Mexicali, fatally shot. Police in Mexico arrested her 61-year-old husband, Louie "Alex" Hernandez, on unrelated charges but suspect him of the murder.
- February 28, 2024 – Righteous Torrence Hill, a 35-year-old African-American transgender businessman who also went by T.K. and Chevy was shot inside his home in East Point, GA. He died on February 29, 2024, during surgery. No arrests have been made.
- March 1, 2024 – a 27-year-old man was attacked on a subway train in New York City as it arrived at Penn Station. The assailant shouted homophobic invective before pulling out a knife. When the victim raised his left hand to defend himself, the attacker slashed it open.
- March 9, 2024 – A 29-year-old African-American transgender woman was pushed in front of an oncoming subway train at the Fulton Street station. Her boyfriend, 35-year-old Christian Valdez, has been charged with attempted murder in the second degree and assault in the first degree. Both of the woman's legs had to be amputated after she was rushed to the hospital.
- March 16, 2024 – Diamond Cherish Brigman, a 36-year-old African-American transgender woman was fatally shot multiple times in Houston. Walter Daniel Saravia Palacios has been arrested and charged with her murder as of May 29, 2024.
- March 17, 2024 – Alex Taylor Franco, a 21-year-old transgender man, was shot and killed in Taylorsville, Utah.
- March 21, 2024 – Meraxes Medina, a 24-year-old Latina transgender woman who worked as a makeup artist at Universal Studios was fatally shot in Los Angeles. Police have indicated they believe Medina was employed as a sex worker in the neighborhood where she was killed.
- April 3, 2024 – Tee Arnold, a 36-year-old African-American transgender man also known as Lagend Billions was shot in Hallandale Beach, FL. He was transported to HCA Florida Aventura Hospital where he died on April 7, 2024. He had posted on social media on April 1 that someone had offered money for his death.
- April 3, 2024 – River Nevaeh Goddard, a 17-year-old non-binary person was found dead in Stow, MA, in the home of their (Note: According to GLAAD, Goddard went by both they/them and she/her pronouns. Conjugations of they are used here for uniformity.) boyfriend, 20-year-old Shane Curry, who subsequently admitted to police that he had stabbed Goddard multiple times with a sword. Goddard had been missing since April 2022.
- April 19, 2024 – Starr Brown, a 28-year-old African-American transgender woman was found dead of a gunshot wound near Scenic Hills Elementary School in Memphis, TN. On April 28, 2024, her co-worker, Alexavier Williamson, reportedly confessed to her murder though police have not revealed a motive.
- April 23, 2024 – Andrea Doria Dos Passos, a 37-year-old homeless transgender woman, was sleeping outside the Miami City Ballet in Miami Beach, then around midnight, she was beaten to death with a pipe by Gregory Gibert. At roughly 7 A.M., a worker at the ballet found Dos Passos' body in a pool of blood, with lacerations on her face and two sticks jammed violently into her nostrils. An examination later found a puncture wound in Dos Passos' chest.
- May 1, 2024 – The body of Darri Moore, a 23-year-old African-American transgender woman, was discovered by laborers at Tower Rock Stone in Ste. Genevieve, MO. Her body showed severe signs of decomposition.
- May 3, 2024 – Kita Bee, a 46-year-old African-American transgender woman was killed in a hit and run in Kansas City, MO.
- May 6, 2024 – Jazlynn Johnson, an 18-year-old transgender woman was fatally shot by her male 17-year-old friend in Las Vegas. The boy initially reported the shooting to his parents as an accident, but police found evidence suggesting the boy intended to kill Johnson.
- May 7, 2024 – Tayy Dior Thomas, a 17-year-old African-American transgender woman of Mobile, AL was shot 18 times, allegedly by her boyfriend of one year, Carl Mitchell Washington, Jr. who is currently being held without bond.
- May 13, 2024 – Two males assaulted a 33-year-old gender non-conforming person outside their Williamsburg home, striking them in the head with a metal pipe before fleeing. The assailants made derogatory comments and reportedly asked the victim if they were a woman before the assault. A 13-year-old boy in Brooklyn has been arrested as one of the two assailants.
- May 15, 2024 – Reginald Folks, a 35-year-old African-American man working as a Lyft driver, was fatally shot by his passenger, former Atlanta police officer Koby Minor. Minor alleged that Folks was trying to kidnap him, claiming to a woman who stopped after seeing Minor's frantic waving from the rear window he had broken that Folks was part of a "gay fraternity". Minor had been on leave from the Atlanta PD since December 2023 and resigned his position after his arrest on May 17.
- May 15, 2024 – Michelle Henry, a 25-year-old African-American transgender woman was killed by manual strangulation after being stabbed multiple times. Her body was found outside a private residence in San Francisco, and though police have arrested a suspect, they have declared the investigation as open and ongoing.
- May 28, 2024 – Jack Calos, a 25-year-old gay man, was punched in the forehead while on his way to work on the Green Line in Boston. The assailant made a homophobic remark as justification for the assault after he attacked Calos.
- May 30, 2024 – Cobalt Sovereign, a 17-year-old transgender girl in Minnetonka, MN was assaulted at school. Sovereign used the boys' restroom due to the gender inclusive restrooms at Hopkins High School often being in use and located inconveniently. Sovereign states that a boy in the restroom looked over the stall and called her a homophobic slur. Sovereign said she then got up from the bathroom stall and left to verbally confront him. "He had no reason to have anything against me, I've never talked to him, never done anything negative to him," Sovereign said. "And I was insulted and then eventually hit in the jaw." Sovereign said that Hopkins High School has gender neutral bathrooms, but that she did not try to use them on the day of the alleged assault because they are usually occupied or out of the way. "I would rather be uncomfortable than make other people uncomfortable by using the women's bathroom," she said. The Minnetonka Police Department did not immediately respond to a request for comment. Without naming Sovereign, the department told KARE 11 this week that they were investigating an incident at Hopkins High School as a "possible hate crime."
- June 23, 2024 – Pauly Likens, a 14-year-old transgender girl from Pennsylvania, was murdered by sharp force trauma to her neck and her corpse was dismembered. Her alleged murderer has been charged with first-degree murder, abuse of a corpse, aggravated assault and tampering with evidence. Pennsylvania does not currently have a hate-crime statute. Governor Josh Shapiro spoke out for expansion of the laws to cover LGBTQ+ individuals following her death.

==== 2025 ====
- February 2025 – Sam Nordquist, a 24-year-old transgender man from Minnesota, was killed after being kidnapped, raped and tortured for over a month. The Ontario County District Attorney stated there was no evidence the killing was a hate crime, stating that "his assailants were known to each other, identified as LGBTQ+, and at least one of the defendants lived with Sam in the time period leading up to the instant offense." GLAAD, the largest LGBTQ advocacy organization in the country, urged New York prosecutors to pursue hate crime charges. In a press release, they stated "While we are encouraged to see law enforcement act swiftly to investigate this horrific act, we caution investigators from ruling out hate crime charges," advising that "anti-LGBTQ hate can be perpetuated by anyone, regardless of their relationship to the victim or their own gender identity or sexual orientation".
- June 1, 2025 – Jonathan Joss, an actor from San Antonio, Texas who was a gay man of Native American ancestry, was approached by a neighbor who allegedly yelled homophobic slurs at him before shooting and killing him.
- September 15, 2025 – Nikki Armstrong, a 39-year-old transgender woman, had gotten into an argument with a group of teenage boys earlier in the evening near the Renton Transit Center. She says the boys were harassing a security guard, and she asked them, "Don't you have anything better to do?". Later that evening, Armstrong was walking back through the area around 8:20 p.m., when she encountered the teens again and attacked her. She said the teens chased after her, knocked her to the ground and started assaulting her while making homophobic slurs.
- September 26, 2025 – Tiara Love Tori Jackson, a transgender woman, was shot to death at a hotel in Charlotte, North Carolina.

==== 2026 ====
- March 13, 2026 – Shyyell Diamond Sanchez-McCray, a drag performer and activist, was shot to death in Petersburg, Virginia.
- April 5, 2026 – Davonta Curtis, a 31-year-old transgender woman, was beaten to death in Chicago, Illinois. Her killer, who was romantically linked to her, reportedly searched online how to kill someone with a hammer.
- April 16, 2026 – Dannielle Spillman, a 74-year-old transgender woman, was killed in San Francisco, California when a driver she had an altercation with hit her with his car and then ran over her.
- April 17, 2026 – Aleanna Royal Belcher, a 31-year-old transgender woman, was stabbed to death in Binghamton, New York.
- April 18, 2026 – Lucas "Luca Redbeard" Ameh Avery Knapp, a 39-year-old transmasculine person, was fatally shot in Cibola County, New Mexico.
- April 28, 2026 – Lanessa Rodriguez, a 35-year-old Puerto Rican transgender woman, was shot multiple times inside her pawn shop in Fort Pierce, Florida. The shooter, Landen Ballard, tried to open the cash register before leaving the store. News media frequently deadnamed Rodriguez while reporting on her murder.
- May 10, 2026 – Juniper Blessing, a 19-year-old transgender woman who was a student at the University of Washington Seattle, was fatally stabbed more than 40 times in a laundry room of student housing affiliated with the university.
- May 17, 2026 – Eryka Caldwell, a 41-year-old transgender woman, was fatally stabbed in Bushwick, New York by her boyfriend, who stabbed her multiple times before slitting her throat.

== See also ==
- Antisemitic trope § Turning people LGBT
- Gay panic
- Hate crime laws in the United States
- History of transgender people in the United States
- Homosexuality and religion
- Lavender Scare
- LGBT demographics of the United States
- LGBT history in the United States
- LGBT people in the United States
- LGBT rights in the United States
- List of acts of violence against LGBT people
- List of organizations designated by the Southern Poverty Law Center as hate groups#Anti-LGBT
- List of people killed for being transgender
- Societal attitudes toward homosexuality
- Trans panic
- Transgender Day of Remembrance
- Transgender genocide
- Transphobia in the United States
- Violence against transgender people in the United States
