= Murder of Steen Fenrich =

American murder victim (1979–1999)

Steen Fenrich (September 13, 1979 – September 9, 1999) was a 19-year-old African-American gay man who lived in Bayside, Queens, New York. In March 2000, his dismembered remains were discovered. Police believe his stepfather, John Fenrich, killed him in a homophobic rage.

== Background ==
Steen Fenrich entered the Army in July 1997, and served nine months before he was discharged. In September 1999 he left his parents' home in Dix Hills, and went missing. However, no one filed a missing person's report on Fenrich.

== Discovery ==
On March 21, 2000, the remains of Steen Fenrich were found stored in a plastic blue tub by a man walking through Alley Pond Park, in Bayside, Queens. The tub contained a skull that had been burned by acid, a foot with some flesh still on it, and other body parts.

The remains were identified as those of Steen Fenrich by his Social Security number, which had been written on the skull, along with racial and homophobic slurs.

== Stepfather ==
Shortly after being told that his stepson's remains had been found, John Fenrich called News 12 Long Island and suggested a motive and that his stepson had been killed "because he was gay." The station later reported that Steen Fenrich had posed for gay pornographic photographs and had a contentious relationship with his stepfather.

Police said they had not yet told family members that Steen Fenrich's remains had been dismembered. John Fenrich's knowledge of the dismemberment led police to believe he killed his stepson.

== Motive ==
Police reported to Newsday that they believed John Fenrich killed Steen on September 9, 1999, after an argument stemming from his stepson's desire to move back home after an argument with his partner. Fenrich disapproved of his son's orientation and was angered by his request to return home.

Steen Fenrich's partner told police that John Fenrich had always treated him with contempt, and had called him a few days after the argument to say that Steen was "going away for a couple of weeks."

== Aftermath ==
On March 22, 2000, after talking to News 12, John Fenrich suddenly bolted from an interview with police in his home, climbed on the roof, fired guns and begged police to shoot him after declaring "I'm a failure as a father."

After an eight-hour standoff, John Fenrich committed suicide by shooting himself in the head.

== See also ==
- Violence against LGBT people
