= Murder of Sean Owen =

2004 murder in Durham, North Carolina

Sean Ethan Owen (1980–2004) was a gay American man who was murdered in Durham, North Carolina on February 17, 2004. Owen's body was found in the Eno River after he was shot twice and left for dead.

Matthew Taylor, Derrick Maiden, and Shelton Epps met Owen through a gay.com chatroom and lured him from his hometown of Franklinton to Durham, where they intended to rob him and steal his car. When Owen attempted to escape, they shot him twice in the head and disposed of his body in the Eno River, where it was found on February 21, 2004. The shooter, Shelton Epps, was convicted of first degree murder and first degree kidnapping and sentenced to life imprisonment, as was Matthew Taylor. Derrick Maiden testified against Taylor and Epps as part of a plea bargain. In exchange, he was allowed to plead guilty to second degree murder and was sentenced to a minimum of nine years and two months and a maximum of 11 years and nine months in prison. Maiden was released from prison on February 18, 2014.

On appeal, Taylor's convictions were vacated. In 2020, he pleaded guilty to voluntary manslaughter and was released on time served on April 9, 2020.

The circumstances of Owen's murder were linked to the murders of other gay men that were connected to the gay.com chatrooms. Police denied a connection between the murders, although some viewed the murders as hate crimes against LGBT people. Bloggers have since compared Owen's murder to highly publicized LGBT hate crimes like the murders of Matthew Shepard and Brandon Teena.
