= Woodward Inn =

- U.S. National Register of Historic Places
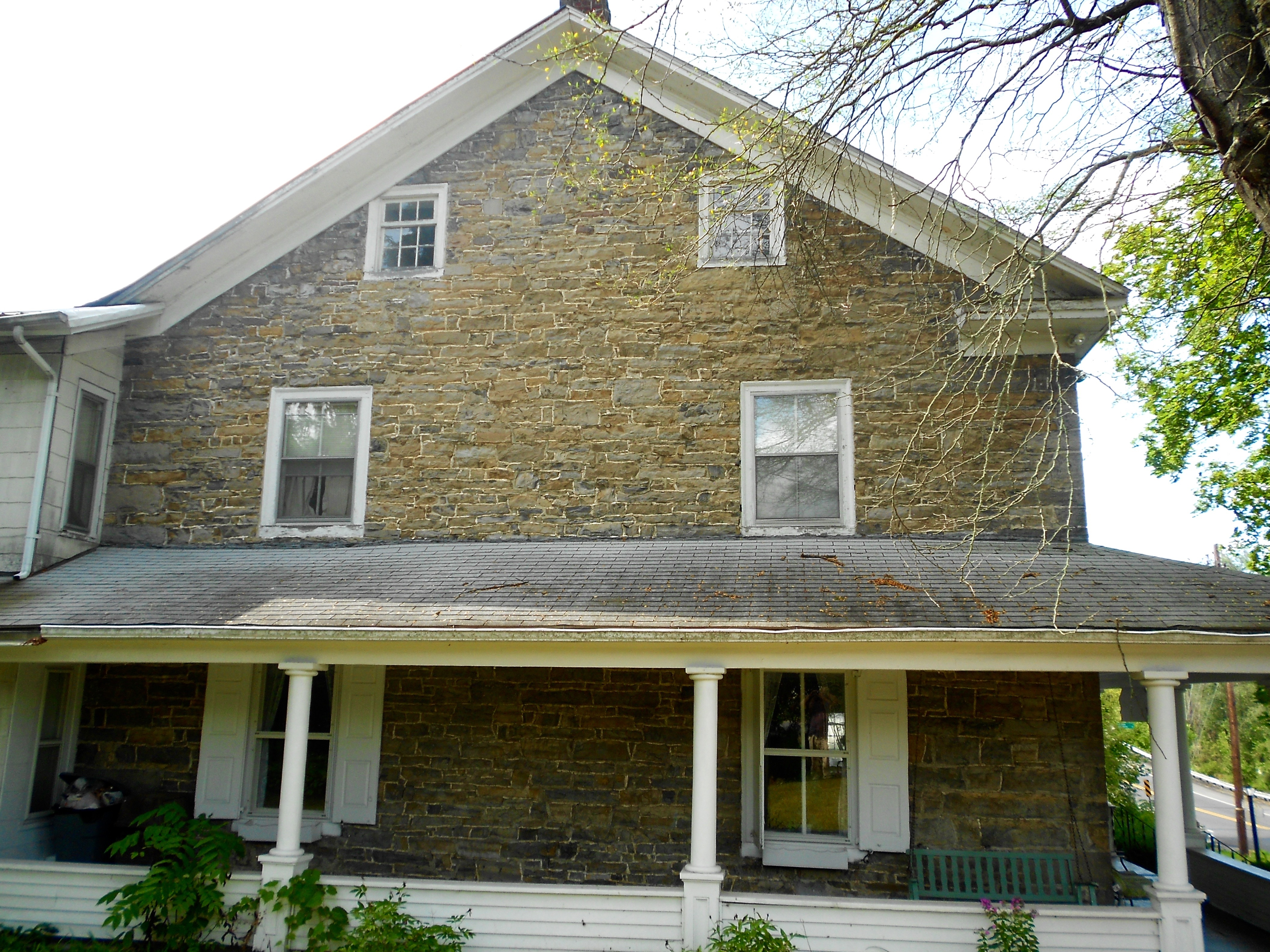
- East end of the inn

- Location within Pennsylvania Location within the United States
- Location: Pennsylvania Route 45 at Woodward, Haines Township, Pennsylvania
- Coordinates: 40°53′55″N 77°21′25″W
- Area: 0.1 acres (0.040 ha)
- Built: 1814
- Architectural style: Georgian, Georgian vernacular
- NRHP reference No.: 78002367
- Added to NRHP: December 18, 1978

The Woodward Inn, also known as the Stagecoach Inn, is an historic inn and tavern in Haines Township, Centre County, Pennsylvania, United States.

It was added to the National Register of Historic Places in 1978.

== History and architectural features ==
Built in 1814, this historic structure is a two-and-one-half-story, five-bay, stone building that measures forty-five feet by thirty-five feet. It has a two-story frame extension that was built along the back length of the stone building. The interior has a center hall plan that was created in the Georgian style. The front facade features twin entrances, typical of early tavern construction.

On October 4th, 2025 sometime in the night the building caught fire and has been deemed a complete loss.
