= Murder of Philip Walsted =

Arizonan murder victim (died 2002)

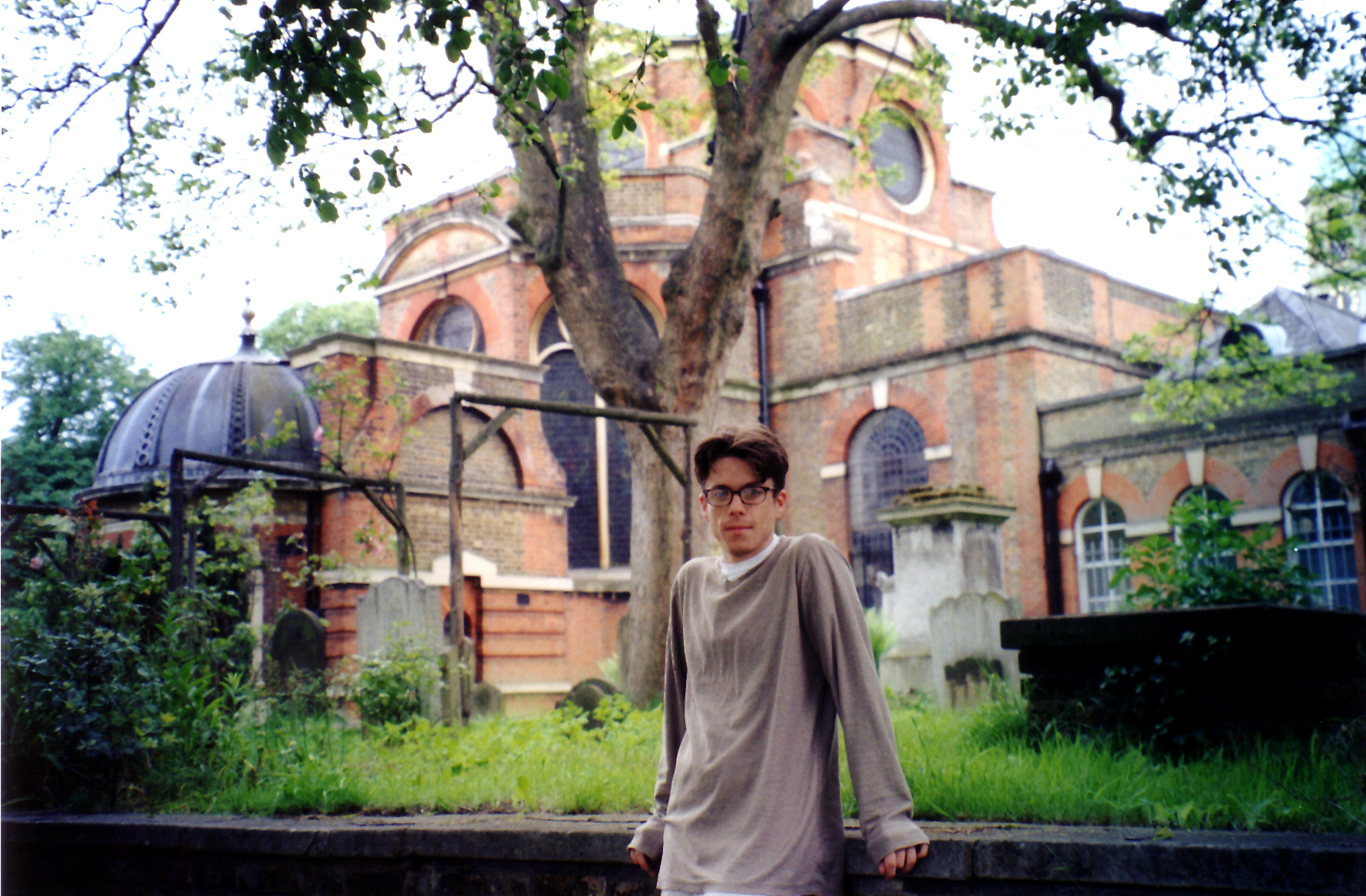
Philip Walsted

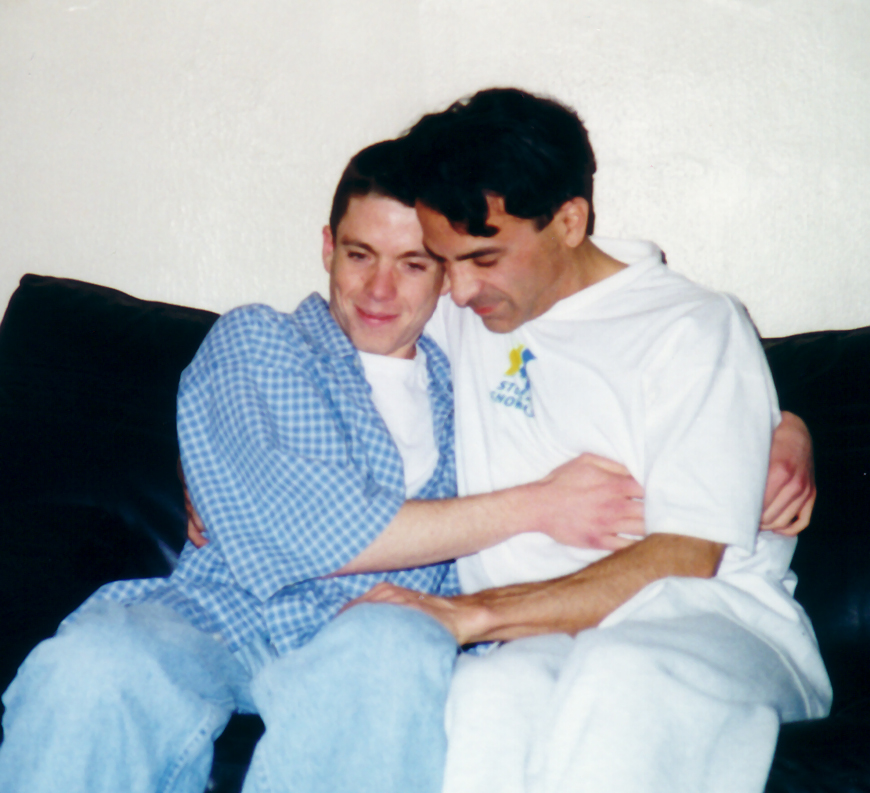
Philip Walsted with partner Jonathan

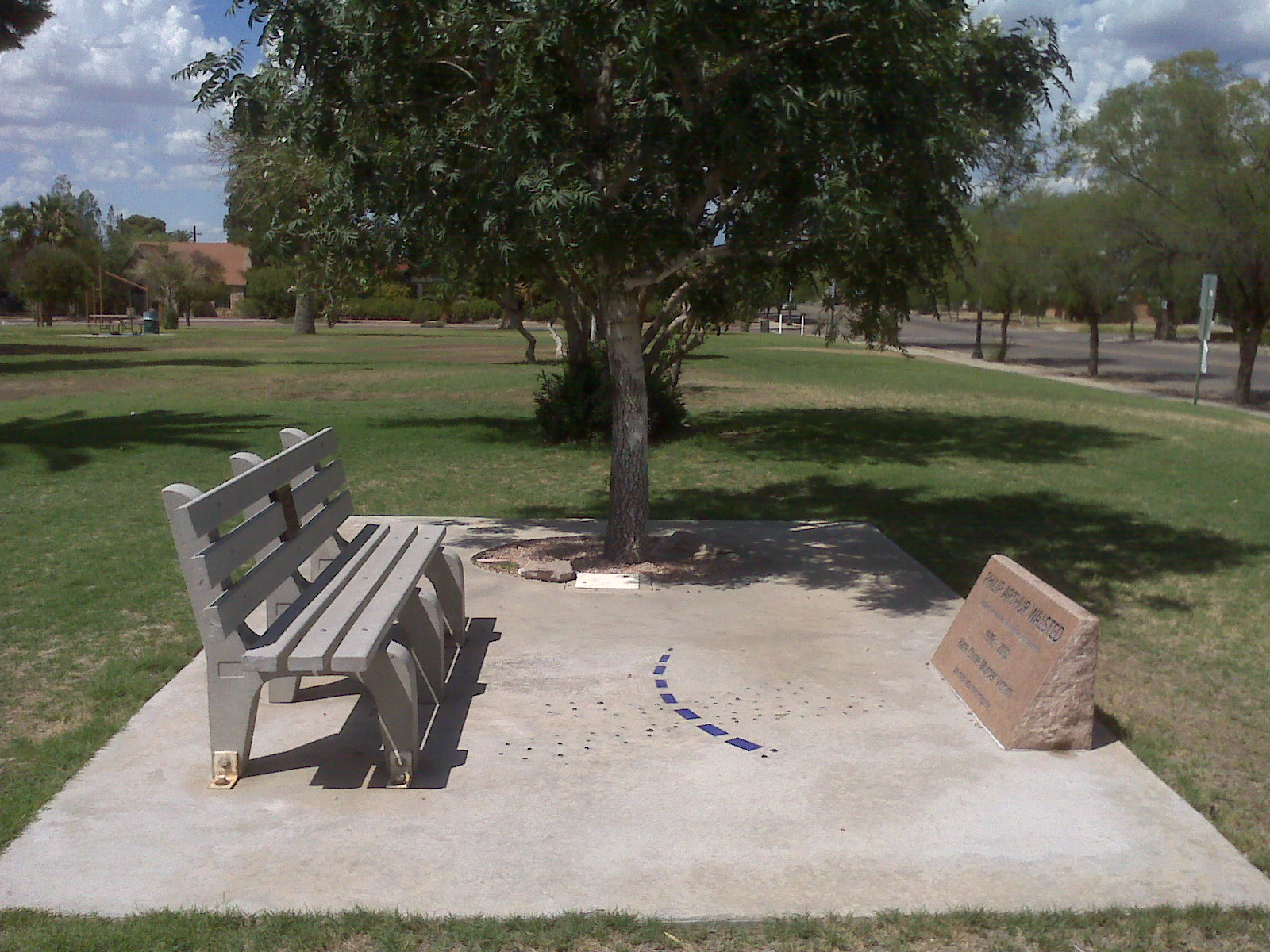
Philip Walsted Memorial, 4th Ave., Catalina Park, Tucson

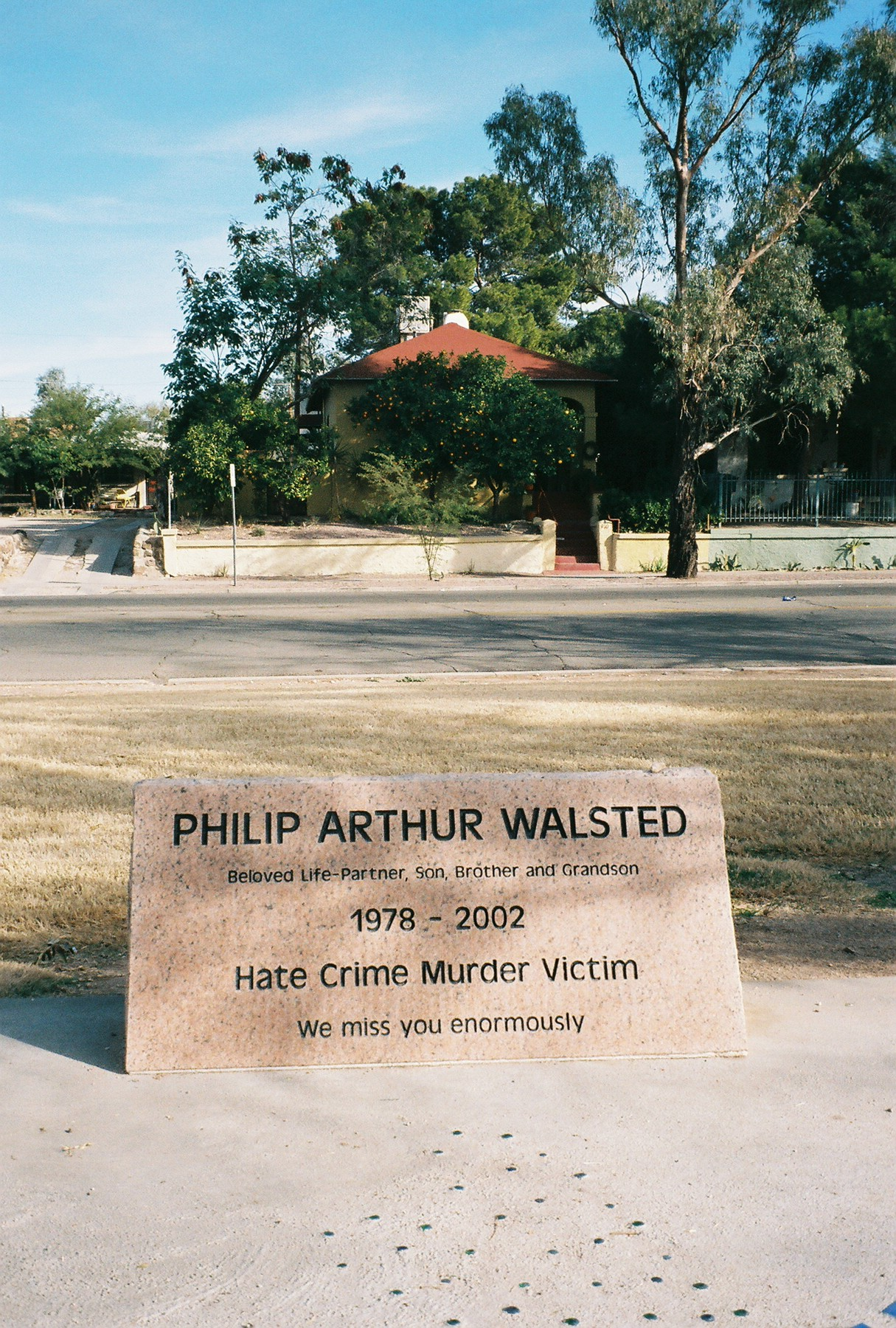
Philip Walsted Memorial (Walsted's red-roofed home in background)

Philip Arthur Walsted was a 24-year-old gay man who was robbed and beaten to death in a hate crime in downtown Tucson, Arizona, on June 12, 2002. He worked for American Airlines as a reservation agent, and lived with his partner, Jonathan.

His supervisor at American Airlines, Linda Kubiak, stated that she and Walsted's co-workers "were forever changed for knowing and working with Philip."

== The attack ==
Walsted was walking home on June 12, 2002, when he was attacked and beaten with a baseball bat by 22-year-old David A. Higdon in the course of a robbery. Walsted was struck in the head with the bat up to 20 times, and received more than 50 wounds as a result of the attack.

Walsted was found, covered with blood, in the street near the home he shared with his partner in the neighborhood of the University of Arizona. He was transported to University Medical Center, where he died later that day.

== Arrest ==
Higdon was arrested one week later. Police found Walsted's eyeglasses, watch, shoes, American Airlines keyring, and driver's license in his possession, as well as newspaper articles about the murder, two baseball bats, clothing soaked with Walsted's blood, marijuana and cocaine.

== Hate crime ==
Initially, police declined to classify the murder as a hate crime. Months later, as evidence accumulated, Tucson Police Department re-classified the case as a hate crime and reported it to the FBI as such.

Higdon, an avowed neo-Nazi, had two lightning bolts tattooed on his chest while in jail (meaning he "killed for the cause"), and arrived in court with his head shaved. Prosecutor Teresa Godoy said that Walsted's murder started as a robbery, but the attack was fueled by Higdon's neo-Nazi beliefs, and was part of an attempt to impress a white supremacist group. Higdon "confessed" to the crime in letters, and by boasting to other inmates.

A representative from the local gay and lesbian center's (Wingspan) Anti-Violence Project, Dr. Lori B. Girshick, attended the trial. She reported that "Higdon had written hundreds of pages of letters and documents while he was incarcerated, leading people to believe that Philip was killed because he was gay."

While Arizona has no specific law against hate crimes, if victims are targeted at least in part because of their race, national origin, sexual orientation, religion, or sex, judges may take that into account.

== Verdict and sentencing ==
In January 2005, Higdon went on trial for first degree murder. He was convicted and in March 2005 was sentenced to life without parole.

In co-operation with the City of Tucson, a memorial was created in Catalina Park on Fourth Avenue, across the street from Philip and Jonathan's home.
