= Murder of Dominique "Rem'mie" Fells =

2020 murder of a Black trans woman in Philadelphia

- The victim, Dominique "Rem'mie" Fells
- Location: Philadelphia, Pennsylvania
- Date: June 6, 2020
- Attack type: Murder by stabbing
- Weapons: Knife; electric saw
- Victim: Dominique "Rem'mie" Fells
- Perpetrator: Akhenaton Jones
- Verdict: Guilty
- Convictions: First-degree murder; Possession of an instrument of crime; Abuse of a corpse

The upper body of Dominique "Rem'mie" Fells, a transgender rights activist and fashion designer, was found floating in the Schuylkill River in Philadelphia, Pennsylvania, United States, on June 8, 2020, and her legs were found three days later by dive teams. It was later determined through witness testimony that she had been killed on June 6, 2020. Investigations soon led to Akhenaton Jones, who, after a mistrial, was convicted of the murder on June 9, 2025. The murder led to protests across the country.

== Background ==
Fells, born on July 30, 1992, was a transgender rights activist, fashion designer, artist, and dancer. She graduated from the Central York High School and studied at the William Penn Performing Arts Institute, both in York, Pennsylvania, before moving to Philadelphia. She resided in the Morris Home for transgender people for a period. In 2019, she organized a fashion show called Rock the Runway – A Trans Empowerment Fashion Show.

== Murder ==
On June 8, 2020, the 27-year-old Fells's body was found floating in the Schuylkill River near Bartram's Garden. Her legs had been cut off; she had been beaten and stabbed over 40 times. Three days later, her legs were found in trash bags by dive teams.

Police suspicion soon revolved around a man named Akhenaton Jones, with whom Fells had formerly been romantically involved. Jones and Fells, witnesses reported, had gone into Jones's bedroom on June 6, 2020. Those witnesses also reported that they had later found Fells' body in the bedroom, covered in blood. Police obtained a search warrant for Jones' residence and investigated, finding a bloody knife, a bloody electric saw, a bloody hazmat suit, and large amounts of blood spatter. Surveillance videos found Jones taking a trash can and trash bag filled with the remains into a white van, which he then drove to the Schuylkill River.Jones attempted to evade arrest by fleeing to California. He was apprehended in Los Angeles and extradited to Pennsylvania to stand trial.

== Conviction and aftermath ==
Jones was tried in December 2024, and claimed to have done the disposal but not the killing. That case ended in a mistrial, as the jury was unable to reach a verdict on the murder charge. However, they did convict for abuse of a corpse. Jones was retried, and on June 9, 2025, he was convicted of first-degree murder, possession of an instrument of crime, and abuse of a corpse. As a mandatory consequence of his conviction, he will receive a life sentence without the possibility of parole.

The Thomas Jefferson University created an endowed scholarship for transgender and non-binary students in honor of Fells; occupational therapy students and a mentor had previously met her during their collaborations with staff at the Morris Home. Politicians, Philadelphia community leaders, and celebrities, including Kerry Washington, Elizabeth Warren, Ed Markey, and Kamala Harris, mourned her death and called for change.

The death, along with the death of fellow Black transgender woman Riah Milton at the same time, sparked protests across the country where tens of thousands took to the streets, often in connection with the broader Black Lives Matter movement. These included Philadelphia, where Fells and Breonna Taylor were honored in a march attended by over five hundred people, Brooklyn, where thousands of protesters joined a Black Trans Lives Matter protest dressed in white for Fells and Milton, and Hollywood, where an estimated twenty-five thousand led an "All Black Lives Matter" demonstration across the Hollywood Walk of Fame. Large-scale protests also occurred in Chicago's Drag March for Change and at Liberty Park in Salt Lake City.
