= List of acts of violence against LGBTQ people =

This is a list of notable violent acts against LGBTQ individuals and organizations. Examples include corrective rape, homicide, gay bashing and other types of assault.

== Afghanistan ==
- On 5 August 2022, Hamed Sabouri was tortured and murdered for being gay. His brother and boyfriend reported that he was killed by Taliban members, but Taliban spokesman Zabihullah Mujahid denied responsibility.

== Argentina ==
- On October 11, 2015, transgender activist Diana Sacayán was stabbed 13 times. Her body was found in her apartment in Flores, Buenos Aires. She had been gagged, handcuffed, and viciously beaten – one of the kicks to her face was so hard it left part of the shoe sole behind – in addition to the stabbing. The evidence indicates there were two people involved in Sacayán's brutal murder. So far, only Gabriel David Marino has been prosecuted. He was found guilty of the crime and sentenced to life imprisonment.
- On October 16, 2016, in Bella Vista, Buenos Aires, lesbian football player Eva Analía De Jesús, known as "Higui", was surrounded by a group of men who threatened to rape her. When the men hit her, she pulled out a knife and killed one of them. She was incarcerated for the killing, leading to protests in Argentina. Eva Analía De Jesús was absolved of the murder on March 17, 2022.
- On March 11, 2021, in San Vicente, Buenos Aires, Tehuel de la Torre, a trans man, left his home for a job interview with Luis Alberto Ramos at Alejandro Korn. This is the last date Tehuel was seen alive. While there is no definitive information as to his whereabouts, Tehuel's cell phone was found in Ramos' home, burned, along with Tehuel's jacket and blood stains that were determined to be Tehuel's through DNA testing. Ramos and his friend, Oscar Alfredo Montes, were charged with aggravated murder due to hatred of gender identity on November 9, 2021.

== Australia ==
- In 1972, George Duncan and Roger Jones were thrown into a river in Adelaide by a group of men believed to be police officers, resulting in Duncan's death. Jones refused to identify their attackers out of fear for his life. Two police officers were charged but acquitted, and the case was said to have been the subject of a government cover-up. An independent police report described it as the result of a "'high-spirited frolic' that went wrong".
- In January 1987, Raymond Keam was killed in Alison Park, Randwick, Sydney. His injuries were consistent with attackers having jumped on his chest while he lay on the ground.
- In December 1988, Scott Johnson's body was found at the bottom of a 50-metre cliff near Blue Fish Point around Manly, Sydney. There have been many investigations into the cause of this death. The police had historically described his death as suicide, but a 2017 inquest – the third on his death – admitted he was murdered in an anti-gay hate crime.
- In January 1989, Richard Johnson was lured to a toilet block in Alexandria Park, Sydney where he had left his phone number on the wall where he was gang bashed to death.
- In July 1989, after a night drinking with friends on Oxford Street in Sydney, Ross Warren's keys were found at the base of the cliffs at Tamarama, his car was nearby. His body was never found.
- In November 1989, John Russell was found at the bottom of Marks Park (between Bondi and Tamarama) with a clump of hair in his hand. Police found no suspicious circumstances.
- In December 1989, David McMahon was attacked in Bondi while jogging in the same place another was attacked a couple days before. He says he clearly remembers them saying, "let's throw him off where we threw the other one off."
- In May 1990, a high school teacher named William Wayne Tonks was found dead in his home in Artarmon, Sydney.
- In July 1990, Kritchikorn Rattanajurathaporn was attacked with a hammer and staggered off a cliff in Bondi. Three men were convicted of his murder in the early 1990s.
- Several of the victims of the Snowtown murders (1992–1999) were openly gay men, while others were labeled by the killers as being gay and/or child abusers. Prosecutor Wendy Abraham suggested the accused men's attitude to paedophiles and homosexuals was a motive.
- On 3 December 2007, Craig Gee was attacked by four men whilst holding his boyfriend's hand walking down Crown Street in Surry Hills, Sydney. Part of his skull was reduced to powder and his leg was broken during the attack. This incident prompted a vigil against the rising level of homophobia in the city and apathy from police, and despite the attack, Gee and his boyfriend joined the Chief of Parade Margaret Cho to lead the 2008 Sydney Gay & Lesbian Mardi Gras parade.
- In 2016, a gay teenager named Tyrone Unsworth killed himself after prolonged homophobic bullying at his school, which culminated with his being hospitalized after his jaw was struck with a fence used as a weapon by another boy.
- Roffee and Waling (2016) conducted a study that aimed to investigate incidents of bullying, harassment and violence committed towards LGBTIQ people. They discovered an issue, however, when they found that many people did not view what they had been subjected to as a hate crime, or even a crime at all. Furthermore, many of the participants commented on feeling that they did not meet the criteria of being a victim of harassment, bullying or violence. This established that prospective participants may not have felt that they met the criteria and thus would not have elected to take part in the study. The conclusion of the study established that all of the participants had been subjected to some form of victimisation, with some of the attacks being extremely violent and criminal.
- In January 2019, news.com.au published an investigation into the murders of several gay men in Victoria in the 1980s and 1990s.

== Brazil ==
- On June 10, 2016, the burnt bodies of Edivaldo Silva de Oliveira and Jeovan Bandeira were found in the back of a car in Bahia, Brazil.
- Osvan Inacio dos Santos, 19, was attacked and murdered in September 2007, on a street near a bar where he had just won the local "Miss Gay" competition in the town of Batingas in northeast Brazil. Dos Santos' naked body was found on Sunday morning, and forensic examination found his skull had been fractured, and had also indicated sexual assault.
- Alexandre Peixe dos Santos, a gay rights activist, was gagged, attacked, and beaten unconscious in February 2008 at the offices of São Paulo's Gay Pride Association in Brazil. Activists estimate that more than 2,680 gay people were murdered in Brazil between 1980 and 2006.
- Alexandre Thome Ivo Rajao, only 14 when he was brutally tortured and murdered in 2010, whilst on the way home from watching the South African World Cup at a friend's house. Many believe this attack to be motivated by homophobia, as Alexandre had been in a same-sex relationship with the cousin of one of the attackers.
- On June 16, 2016, 21-year-old Gabriel Figueira Lima, described as a "travesti", was stabbed in the neck and left to die.
- On June 24, 2016, the body of Wellington Júlio de Castro Mendonça was found northwest of Rio, and he was allegedly stoned to death.
- On February 4, 2017, Ágatha Mont, a 26 year old transgender woman, was a university student found strangled in Itapevi, São Paulo, after being threatened for using the women's restroom.
- Mirella de Carllo, a 39 year old trans woman and activist, was found strangled to death on February 19, 2017.
- Emanuelle Muniz, a 21-year-old trans woman who had been preparing for gender confirmation surgery, was kidnapped and murdered in Ańapolis, Goiás on February 26, 2017, by blunt trauma to the head with a stone.
- Hérika Izidoro, 24; Michelly Garcia, 25; Jennifer Celia Henrique, 37; Lexia Famosinha, 30; Camila Albuquerque, 20; and Bruninha Tavares, 17, were all violently killed between March and April 2017, on account of their gender identity.
- On June 27, 2016, Antonio Kvalo was beaten for being gay in Rio de Janeiro. Kvalo created a website named Tem Local? for people to document instances of LGBTI violence.
- On February 19, 2017, a 20-year-old university student, Marcos Valdevino, was punched in the face in public in Olinda, Pernambuco, while waiting for his friends to arrive.
- In 2020, an Evangelical bishop in Recanto das Emas, Brazil, was sentenced to twenty years in prison for raping a 13-year-old lesbian girl. The rape was an attempt to change her sexuality.
- In 2020, lesbian student Gabriela Oliveira Guimarães was harassed and beaten by a seven or eight men for her sexuality in São Bernardo do Campo. They called her slurs, then punched and kicked her until she lost consciousness. A group of trans women managed to scare the attackers away.

== Canada ==
- Kenneth Zeller, a gay man in Toronto, Ontario, who was employed as a schoolteacher, was murdered by five young offenders in High Park in 1985. The incident spurred the Toronto District School Board to implement a program to combat anti-gay discrimination and violence – culminating in the creation of the Triangle Program, Canada's first alternative school program for at-risk LGBT youth, in 1995.
- On March 19, 1989, Joe Rose, a young gay activist in Montreal, was stabbed to death by a gang of teenagers who targeted him for having pink hair. The incident later inspired educator Michael Whatling, who had been a classmate of Rose's at the time of his death, to publish A Vigil for Joe Rose, an exploration of the struggles faced by LGBT students.
- On August 21, 1989, Alain Brosseau, a straight man in Ottawa, was attacked by a gang of teenagers who wrongly assumed him to be gay, while walking home from his job at the Château Laurier. The attackers chased him through Major's Hill Park to the Alexandra Bridge, and then threw him off the bridge resulting in his death. This resulted in a gay and lesbian community outcry and eventually led to the formation of the Ottawa Police Service's GLBT Liaison Committee two years later.
- On November 29, 1992, Yves Lalonde was murdered in Montreal's Angrignon Park by a gang of four neo-Nazi skinheads.
- Aaron Webster, a gay man in Vancouver, British Columbia, was beaten to death with baseball bats and pool cues on November 17, 2001, in a part of Stanley Park known for cruising. Ryan Cran, along with two unidentified youths, was convicted of manslaughter in Webster's death. Cran was paroled in February 2009 after serving four years of a six-year sentence.
- Conner Copeman, 20, of Cumberland, British Columbia, was assaulted in Saskatoon, Saskatchewan, on July 11, 2007, by a group of men in a park in the city's Buena Vista neighbourhood. Copeman had recently moved to the city, and told police that he was flirting with some men, who later attacked him. Copeman was found lying in the street six blocks east of the park, with a broken neck. Copeman ended up a quadriplegic as a result of his injuries.
- Jordan Smith, 27, of White Rock, British Columbia, was assaulted on September 27, 2008, by 20-year-old Michael Kandola of Vancouver. Smith was holding hands with another male while walking in Vancouver's Davie Village, an area frequented by LGBTQ individuals, when Kandola started following the pair with four to five of his friends and began shouting anti-gay obscenities towards the gay pair. Kandola confronted the two and punched Smith on the side of his head, knocking him unconscious. Smith required surgery for his injuries. Kandola was charged with assault causing bodily harm, and police sought to invoke Canadian hate-crime legislation against Kandola. A Facebook group with over 4000 members was established and they petitioned for a minimum life imprisonment sentence for Kandola. On April 30, 2010, the assault was deemed by the B.C. Supreme Court to be a hate crime and Kandola was sentenced to 17 months in jail.
- Anji Dimitriou and Jane Currie were physically assaulted on November 3, 2008, at an Oshawa, Ontario public school while waiting to pick up their children. Mark Scott, the attacker, punched both women in the face, referring to them as "men", "fucking dyke bitches" and spit in Dimitriou's face. He was in court in January 2009, for two counts of assault causing bodily harm. However, the incident was prosecuted as a simple assault rather than a hate crime, because Scott did not advocate genocide nor did he incite anyone else to participate in the attack.
- On March 13, 2009, Shawn Woodward was charged with aggravated assault after physically attacking 62-year-old Ritchie Dowrey in Vancouver's Fountainhead Pub, allegedly because "He's a faggot. He deserved it." Dowrey had briefly bumped into Woodward's shoulder, which the heterosexual Woodward characterized during his trial as a predatory sexual advance. Although Dowrey survived the assault, he suffered serious and permanent brain damage, and spent the entire rest of his life living in care facilities until his death in 2015. At Woodward's trial, Justice Jocelyn Palmer rejected the allegation that Dowrey had groped Woodward, ultimately finding that "[Woodward's] intention was to deny, deflect and dissemble. He fabricated this story to justify his outrageous assault."
- On October 18, 2010, the home of a gay couple in Little Pond, Prince Edward Island, was firebombed. Both men escaped the fire unharmed, but their home was destroyed. In late October and November, a series of rallies and fundraising concerts was held in both Little Pond and Charlottetown to support the couple and to oppose homophobic violence.
- On December 8, 2011, in Whitehorse, Yukon, a gay man, Owen Williams, was kicked out of a bar, handcuffed and detained by the RCMP for looking at gay hookup sites on his laptop. As a result, a former supreme court justice stated that the RCMP tolerates 'misogynistic, racist, and homophobic attitudes'.
- On April 17, 2012, Halifax gay activist Raymond Taavel was beaten to death outside Menz & Mollyz, a gay bar on the city's Göttingen Street, by Andre Denny, a paranoid schizophrenic who was on an unsupervised leave from a nearby forensic hospital for those who are found Not Criminally Responsible for their previous unlawful actions, after he attempted to break up a fight between Denny and another man. Taavel was a former chair of Halifax Pride, the city's gay pride festival, and a former editor at the LGBT magazine Wayves and the spiritual magazine Lion's Roar. Over 1,000 people attended a vigil in Taavel's memory later that evening, which included performances by poet Tanya Davis, actor and writer Stewart Legere and singer-songwriters Rose Cousins and Ria Mae. Although there were unconfirmed allegations that Denny used anti-gay slurs while he was attacking Taavel, to date media and the police have not asserted that the case clearly constituted a hate crime, generally attributing the attack to Denny's mental illness rather than to a specifically anti-gay bias. Taavel had previously survived a more clearly anti-gay physical attack, which he wrote about in Wayves in May 2010.
- On September 30, 2012, in New Westminster, British Columbia, January Marie Lapuz, 26, was found in her home in the 500 block of Third Avenue around 10 p.m. September 30, 2012 suffering from stab wounds. She died the next morning at Royal Columbian Hospital. Charles Jameson Neel, 22, pleaded guilty to manslaughter in June in her stabbing death and was sentenced to eight years in prison. Lapuz was the first transgender person on the executive of Sher Vancouver, an organization supporting gay, lesbian, bisexual and transgender South Asians. She was named the organization's social coordinator, according to its website in 2012.
- On October 12, 2013, Scott Jones, a gay resident of New Glasgow, Nova Scotia, was stabbed by a knife-wielding man after leaving the Acro Lounge. He was left paraplegic by the attack. His attacker, Shane Matheson, was found guilty and sentenced to 10 years in prison in June 2014. During his recovery, Jones participated in the creation of Don't Be Afraid, a province-wide campaign to combat homophobia, and was selected as the grand marshal of the 2014 Halifax Pride parade. He was profiled in the 2018 documentary film Love, Scott, and has since gone on to create several musical, theatrical and film works of his own about his experience.
- On June 28, 2023, Geovanny Villalba Alemán, an international student from Ecuador, stabbed and injured two students and the professor during a gender studies class in Hagey Hall at the University of Waterloo.
- On September 26, 2026, a violent gay bashing took place in St. Catharines, Ontario, Canada. 25 year old, Carson McCoy, was beaten unconscious and later taken to the hospital with serious injuries. While outside at night with friends, one woman and three men jumped McCoy before kicking, punching, and spitting on him. Upon arriving at the hospital, the victim's mother was told by a paramedic that "she would not be prepared for what she saw" due to the level of brutality. He endured a fractured orbital bone entrapped inside his eye, a concussion, and severe bruising. Niagara Police confirmed the assault to be hate motivated gayphobia and violence against LGBTQ people.

== Chile ==
- Mónica Briones, an openly lesbian artist, was beaten to death on a sidewalk in Santiago in 1984 for her sexual orientation. She was with a friend, who survived the attack. The culprit has never been found.
- María Pía Castro, an out lesbian football player, was beaten to death in 2008 in Limache. Her body was set on fire to cover evidence. Her case was closed even though no culprit was found; a feminist group, Red Chilena Contra la Violencia Hacia las Mujeres (Chilean Network Against Violence Toward Women), protested this decision.
- Daniel Zamudio, a Chilean gay man, was tortured and murdered in Santiago in 2012 after his attackers learned of his sexual orientation. After his murder he has become a symbol against homophobic violence in Chile, and his death and all the media attention contributed to accelerating legislation against discrimination, as well as opening new doors of acceptance and tolerance of differences in the conservative country. An anti-discrimination law, informally known as Zamudio's Law, was named for him.
- Nicole Saavedra Bahamondes, an out butch lesbian, was murdered in Limache in 2016. Her body showed signs of torture. The Chilean Network Against Violence Toward Women also protested her murder, labeling it a femicide. Activists and Saavedra's family criticized the justice system for not solving her case.
- Anna Cook (born Ana González Villarroel), a lesbian DJ, was killed in Angol in 2017. Her body was found completely naked, and there was semen in her mouth. Her death was initially ruled an overdose. However, a friend of Cook's believed that she'd been raped and murdered, as she was an open lesbian and would not have willingly had sex with a man. A lawyer in the Cook case described her death as a lesbophobic crime. Her unsolved murder gained national attention, with the graffiti message "Who killed Anna Cook?" showing up in cities across Chile.
- Susana Sanhueza, a lesbian animal rights activist, was found dead in the town hall of San Felipe in March 2017. She was meeting with her friend Cristian Muñoz, the last person to see her alive. Sanhueza had type 1 diabetes and was prone to hypoglycemia. Muñoz told police that she began to have a seizure and, being unable to revive her, he covered her head with a grocery bag and tied it shut. He was not charged with her murder. Sanhueza's family believes that Muñoz killed her because he was attracted to her and became frustrated when Sanhueza did not reciprocate. Karen Vergara, a Chilean lesbian activist, told the BBC that "His lack of acceptance that she was a lesbian, and then not alerting the police [of her death], speaks to a hatred of gay women...it's lesbophobia."
- Dominique Moreau and Melannie León, a young lesbian couple living together in Santiago, received death threats from their neighbors in 2017. Neighbors also vandalized their household, spraying the door with red paint and destroying potted plants. Violence escalated when neighbors hit the women; one threatened them with a gun. The couple fled their home.
- Carolina Torres, a butch lesbian football player, was out with her girlfriend for Valentine's Day in 2019 when three men attacked her outside a post office in Pudahuel. They fractured her skull and caused internal bleeding, intending to kill her. The same group of men had attacked her previously. Bystanders did not intervene; Torres' girlfriend had to call a relative for help. The attack left Torres severely disabled. Two of her attackers were sentenced to prison.
- Cynthia Leslie Velásquez, a butch lesbian known as "Chico Leslie" in her neighborhood, was attending a party in Lo Espejo in 2020 when a male guest attempted to sexually assault a female guest. Velásquez intervened, and the man stabbed her. The two knew each other; the man had previously insulted Velásquez for her masculine appearance and presentation. Neighbors took her to the hospital, where she died. Feminist groups in Chile have demanded that the murderer be found and charged.

== China ==
- In July 2025, attackers used gay social networking service Blued to date homosexuals. After the victims arrived at Zhengzhou People's Park, the attackers beat them with sticks and pepper spray. The police arrested 17 suspects, 5 of whom were underage.

== Croatia ==
- 30 participants at a gay pride event in Croatia were attacked by multiple assailants on July 7, 2007. The attackers had also prepared Molotov cocktails but were stopped by the police before using them. Many people taking part in Gay Pride marches in Eastern Europe (e.g.: Romania, Russia, Serbia) have been beaten after leaving the marches.

== France ==
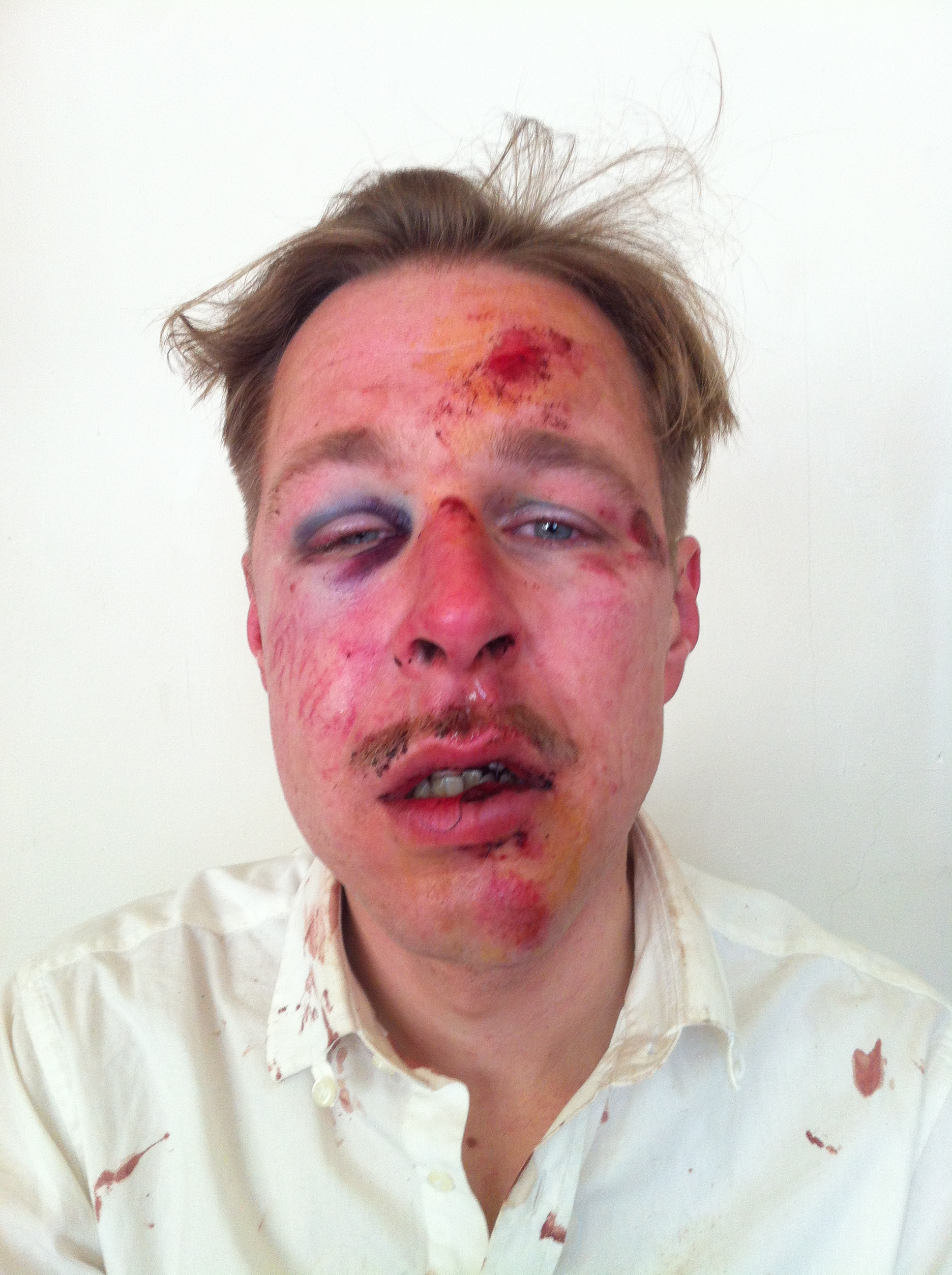
Wilfred De Bruijn on April 7, 2013

- Francois Chenu was murdered (beaten and drowned) by neo-Nazi skinheads on September 13, 2002, in Reims, France. The murder became the subject of the documentary Beyond Hatred, which includes extended interviews with members of Francois' family during and after the trial. As depicted in the documentary, one of the assailants was a minor, who received a 15-year sentence, while two adult attackers received 20-year sentences. The parents of the 15-year-old also received 6-month sentences for their neglect, contributing to their son's violence.
- Bertrand Delanoë, the openly gay mayor of Paris, was non-fatally stabbed by a Muslim immigrant, Azedine Berkane, in October 2002.
- Alexis Frumin was murdered June 9, 2007, in Reims by white power skinheads motivated by hatred of his ethnicity and sexual orientation.
- Wilfred de Bruijn was beaten while walking with his boyfriend in the 19th arrondissement of Paris on April 7, 2013. De Bruijn later posted a photograph of his badly injured face on Facebook to raise awareness of homophobic attacks, attracting international media attention in the process. The attack was executed by Taieb K. and Abdelmalik M.

== Germany ==
- Persecution of homosexuals in Nazi Germany
- In June 2017, a heterosexual male verbally harassed a lesbian couple in Berlin. When the couple did not respond to his provocations, the man started beating both women relentlessly with a glass bottle and choked one of them until she lost consciousness.
- On June 9, 2019, a lesbian couple was insulted and physically assaulted at a streetfood truck by a patron in Berlin.
- A lesbian couple was gay bashed by three unknown males in December 2019 while riding the tram in Berlin.
- On October 4, 2020, a gay couple was attacked by a 20-year-old Islamic extremist in the old town of Dresden. The perpetrator stabbed one of them to death and severely wounded the other one and is now facing charges of murder and attempted murder. The prosecutor of the case believes homophobia was the main motivation behind the crime.
- On August 27, 2022, a transgender man was killed at Münster gay pride. The victim wanted to help a group of women who were being verbally abused by the perpetrator
- During the Christopher Street Day in Berlin-Tiergarten, a delivery van was driven into a crowd near Potsdamer Platz around 10 p.m., killing one person and injuring 29 others. The event was called off early. The 21-year-old suspect, an Islamist known to the authorities, was shot dead by police during an operation on the evening of the following day.

== Iraq ==
- In 2005, the Grand Ayatollah Ali al-Sistani issued a fatwa on his website calling for the execution of gays in the "worst, most severe way". Following protests from UK-based Iraqi gay rights groups, Sistani agreed to remove the fatwa from his website except for the section calling for the punishment of lesbianism. In January 2007, a United Nations report described the increased persecution, torture and extrajudicial killing of Iraqi lesbians and gay men by the Shia death squads of the Badr and Sadr militias (the armed wings of the two main Shia parties that control the government of Iraq).

== Ireland ==
- Charlie Self, a 33-year-old set designer at the TV network RTÉ and a well-known member of the gay community in Dublin, was stabbed fourteen times in his apartment on 21 January 1982. Nobody has been brought to justice for the killing. It has been alleged in the press that homophobia on the part of the police may have led to a lack of willingness to pursue justice against Self's killer. In 2011 the case was reinvestigated as part of a cold cases review.
- John Roche, a 29-year-old who worked as a night porter at the then-named Munster Hotel in Cork City, was stabbed to death in a homophobic murder on 8 September 1982. Michael O'Connor of Windsor Place, St Luke's in Cork was arrested and charged. He admitted to police that he engaged in sexual activity with Roche before killing him in room 26 of the hotel. O'Connor told police that Roche 'tried to make him gay', saying "I had to kill him, he would have ruined my life. He wanted me to become a gay. I said 'No way' and I killed him". O'Connor pleaded not guilty to Roche's murder. Despite his admission of pre-mediation and of tying Roche to a chair and killing him by stabbing him in the chest, O’Connor was only convicted of the lesser sentence of manslaughter. Mr Justice McMahon, when passing sentence on O’Connor, cited a ‘gay panic defence’. The judge said he believed Roche was a homosexual who enticed O'Connor to take part in homosexual acts with him, telling O’Connor "after engaging in these acts you were likely to feel hostility and revulsion, and because of your low level of intelligence, you have less than normal self-control". O’Connor was only sentenced to five years in prison.
- Just one day after John Roche's murder in Cork, Declan Flynn was beaten to death in Fairview Park, Dublin, on 9 September 1982. The murder and subsequent suspended sentences of the perpetrators who pleaded guilty to murder saw the emergence of a more vocal gay community in the aftermath.
- In January 1999, American expatriate writer Robert Drake was left permanently brain damaged after being assaulted by two men, Glen Mahon and Ian Monaghan, whom he had let into his home in Sligo. Drake was targeted because of his sexual orientation. The story of the attack and Drake's subsequent recovery became the subject of the 2013 documentary Where I Am.
- TV personality Mark O'Neill and his partner came under a bloody attack from a gay bashing gang while walking on Patrick Street in Dublin in 2010.
- TV presenter Brendan Courtney was battered by a gay bashing stranger while walking home down South Great George's Street in Dublin in 2011. A man in his early twenties punched him in the face and shouted "queer" before running away. Courtney said it was "disgraceful" that such an incident could occur in Dublin. He told Liveline that more than 50 other gay people had told him of their own experiences of being assaulted or verbally abused in towns nationwide.

== Israel ==
- Three marchers in a gay pride parade in Jerusalem on June 30, 2005 were stabbed and wounded by Yishai Shlisel, a Haredi Jew. Shlisel claimed he had acted "in the name of God". He was charged with attempted murder.
- The 2009 Tel Aviv gay centre shooting resulted in the death of two people and wounding of 15.
- On 30 July 2015, a marcher was killed and six other injured, again by Yishai Shlisel when he stabbed them. It was three weeks after he was released from jail.

== Italy ==
- Friends Elisa Pomarelli and Massimo Sebastiani disappeared in the Province of Piacenza on August 25, 2019. Pomarelli's strangled body was found in the woods on September 7, 2019. Massimo Sebastiani had killed her. He was charged with the murder in 2020. He was attracted to her, but Pomarelli repeatedly refused his advances, telling him she was a lesbian and only interested in women.
- On September 12, 2020, an 18-year-old woman and her transgender partner were rammed with a car by the woman's brother. She died at the scene, while her partner sustained serious injuries. He was also kicked after the crash. The victim's brother, who was arrested and accused of manslaughter, claimed that he did not accept his sister's relationship.
- In 2020, two men attacked their lesbian neighbors in a courtyard in Novara. One woman sustained a broken nose and skull fractures. The young couple had previously received insults from their neighbors, including "Shut up lesbians" and "Fucking lesbians."
- In 2020, an older woman threatened a teenage couple with a knife and called them "ugly lesbians" on public transport in Genoa.
- On November 9, 2021, a mixed-race Tunisian-Italian lesbian was attacked while getting into her girlfriend's car. Her father grabbed her by the hair and slapped her, while her mother insulted her. A hotel clerk saw and brought her to safety.

== Jamaica ==
- Brian Williamson, Jamaican gay rights activist, was murdered on June 5, 2004, in Kingston. His killer, Dwight Hayden, who used a machete to stab and chop him some 70 times, pleaded guilty and received a life sentence.
- An alleged gay man was chased down a pier by a Jamaican mob in December 2005. The man, fearful of the crowd, jumped into the water and drowned.
- An alleged gay student was attacked during a student riot in April 2006 at the University of the West Indies in Jamaica.
- A group of gay men, including gay-rights activist Gareth Williams, were stoned by a mob in Mandeville, Jamaica, on February 14, 2007. Their attackers reportedly had earlier demanded that the men leave the community.
- During the funeral of a gay man in Mandeville, Jamaica, on April 8, 2007, approximately 100 men gathered outside the church where 150 people were attending. According to mourners, the crowd broke the windows with bottles and shouted, "We want no battyman [gay] funeral here. Leave or else we're going to kill you. We don't want no battyman buried here in Mandeville."
- Three gay men were attacked in the privacy of their dwelling in January 2008, by an angry mob who had days before threatened them if they did not leave the community in Mandeville. According to reports, two men were hospitalised, one with serious injuries, while another man is still missing and feared dead.

== Martinique ==
- In 1964, American composer Marc Blitzstein was murdered in a homophobic attack by three sailors.

== Mexico ==
- Between October and December 2005, six gay men were kidnapped from Mexico City's Zona Rosa, four of whom were murdered. On 23 January 2006, police arrested former army officer Raúl Osiel Marroquín, who confessed to torturing and killing the men, espousing strongly negative sentiments towards gay men.
- On May 22, 2016, reports indicate that between five and 15 people were killed in a mass shooting at La Madame, a gay bar in Xalapa. Three gunmen entered the bar and carried out a mass shooting. Although the state prosecutor issued a statement noting that five people were killed, and 14 were injured, contradictory reports suggest there were many more deaths. Although police are searching for the gunmen, no arrests have been made.
- In January 2022, the bodies of Nohemí Medina and Yulizsa Ramírez were found alongside the road in Ciudad Juárez. They had been tortured and murdered; their corpses were dismembered and left in garbage bags. The women lived in El Paso in the US and were married with three children. They were traveling to Juárez to visit family when they were killed. Their suspected killers were charged with femicide.

== New Zealand ==
- Jeff Whittington, a supposedly gay teenager, was beaten, kicked, and stomped to death by two men who reportedly later boasted of beating up a "faggot". The murder took place in Wellington, New Zealand, on May 8, 1999. Whittington's attackers, Jason Morris Meads and Stephen James Smith, were sentenced to life in prison.

== Nigeria ==
- Ifeanyi Chukwu-Agah Benedict, a Nigerian transgender woman who was predominantly known as Abuja Area Mama, was murdered on August 8, 2024. Her body was found along the Katampe-Mabushi Expressway in the Banex, Wuse 2 area of the Federal Capital Territory.

== Norway ==
- Magne Andreassen was murdered on August 21, 1992, in Lillehammer. The police investigation took about a year before Bård Faust, the drummer of the band Emperor, was tried and convicted of the killing. He was released from prison in 2002.
- On 25 June 2022, two people were killed and 21 more injured in a mass shooting at three sites in Oslo, Norway. The shootings are believed by the police to have targeted Oslo Pride, the local LGBT pride event hosted by the Oslo branch of the Norwegian Organisation for Sexual and Gender Diversity. The police arrested a man, a naturalised immigrant from Iran, who has been charged with murder, attempted murder, and terrorism. They are investigating the shooting as an act of Islamic terrorism.

== Peru ==
- On May 31, 1989, six members of the Túpac Amaru Revolutionary Movement entered the nightclub "Las Gardenias" in Tarapoto because they had heard rumors that the place functioned as a clandestine gay bar. In the place there were homosexual men and transgender women, the terrorists apprehended eight of them at random and took them to the outskirts of the bar to shoot them in front of the population. Months later, in September, Fransuá Pinchi, a transgender woman and beauty salon owner, was shot in the head by the same group.
- In May 2021, Shining Path guerrillas killed upwards of 14 people in bars in the VRAEM region. Men, women, and children were killed, either by flame or gunfire. The goal was social cleansing (limpieza social). A pamphlet left on scene read, "We must clean VRAEM and Peru of cuchipampas or brothels, madmen, homosexual degenerates, lesbian degenerates, drug addicts, undisciplined individuals who do not respect anyone, thieves, kidnappers, corrupt people, snitches, spies, infiltrators" and so on.

== Poland ==
- On 4 January 2014, a Polish gay student named Patrick was beaten to death after spending the night at local gay bars and clubs in Szczecin. The two suspects involved did not have any previous criminal records, and police suspected that the crime was motivated by homophobia.
- On 20 July 2019, the first Białystok equality march was held in Białystok. Approximately a thousand pride marchers were opposed by thousands of members of far-right groups, ultra football fans, and others. Firecrackers were tossed at the marchers, homophobic slogans were chanted, and the marchers were pelted with rocks and bottles. Dozens of marchers were injured. Amnesty International criticized the police response, saying they had failed to protect marchers and "failed to respond to instances of violence". According to the New York Times, similar to the manner in which the Unite the Right rally in Charlottesville shocked Americans, the violence in Białystok raised public concern in Poland over anti-LGBT propaganda.

== Portugal ==
- Gisberta Salce Júnior, more commonly known in Portugal as the Gisberta case, was a homeless Brazilian transsexual immigrant, who was HIV positive, had drug problems, and was a sex-worker. She was found dead on February 22, 2006, inside a pit 10 metres deep, in an unfinished building in Porto, the second biggest Portuguese city. The crime was confessed to by a group of 14 boys, between the ages of 10 and 16 years old, most of whom came from a child protection institution belonging to the Catholic Church, although financed by the state. From this confession, details of the dreadful act became known. The victim had a deeply fragile health condition, and these boys frequently harassed, insulted, and chased her. On the 19th, a group of these boys entered the unfinished and abandoned building where Gisberta was staying, tied her up, gagged and assaulted her with extreme violence, kicking her and beating her up with sticks and stones. The group also confessed to having introduced sticks into Gisberta's anus, whose body presented great injuries, and to having abandoned her at the scene. Her body also had cigarette-burn marks. On the 20th and 21st, they returned to the scene and repeated the aggressions. By dawn, from the 21st to 22nd, they finally threw her into the pit, attempting to hide the crime.

== Puerto Rico ==
- Kevin Fret was a Puerto Rican singer and the first openly gay Latin trap artist. On January 10, 2019, while Fret was riding his motorcycle in Santurce, San Juan, at about 5:30 am, an unidentified gunman shot at him eight times, hitting him in the head and hip. The Puerto Rico Trans Youth Coalition labeled Fret's murder as a hate crime.

== Serbia ==
- Participants of the first Serbian Pride Parade in Belgrade on June 30, 2001, were attacked by hundreds of Serbian nationalists, skinheads, and soccer hooligans.
- Noa Milivojev, was an 18-year old TikTok influencer and a trans woman. She was murdered by her boyfriend and her dismembered body has been found in July, 2023. A vigil for her was held at Republic Square in Belgrade.
- Dejan Nebrigić, a gay activist was murdered in Pančevo on his 29th birthday. Former president Slobodan Milošević used his murder for his anti-gay and anti-western propaganda.

== Sierra Leone ==
- FannyAnn Eddy was the most prominent Sierra Leonean gay and lesbian rights activist, working for Sierra Leone Lesbian and Gay Association (SLLGA) which she had founded in 2002, and had addressed the United Nations on lesbian and gay issues in her country during the discussion on the Brazilian Resolution. On September 28, 2004, Eddy was raped and murdered while working alone in the Freetown SLLGA office. It is believed up to three men took part in the attack. Sierra Leone Police Force said that the murder could not be blamed on homophobia, and dismissed the claim that she had been raped, or that there was more than one attacker. The one suspect that had been captured escaped from police custody before trial and has not been recaptured or prosecuted. Human rights activists are unclear whether this was a hate crime or not, but regard her attack by one or more individuals in the offices of SLLGA as significant. They have asked why only one suspected attacker was captured, expressed concern over repeated delays in prosecution, and how the suspect was able to escape custody. In 2007 the Hirschfeld Eddy Foundation for the human rights of lesbian, gay, bisexual and transgender (LGBT) people was established in Berlin; the name is a combination of Eddy and Magnus Hirschfeld's names.

== Singapore ==
- Philip Low Cheng Quee, the operator of an illegal brothel where he hired male prostitutes from Thailand and Malaysia to provide sexual services. One of these prostitutes, 18-year-old Malaysian teen Lim Chin Chong, had killed Low and was sentenced to death for murder.

== South Africa ==
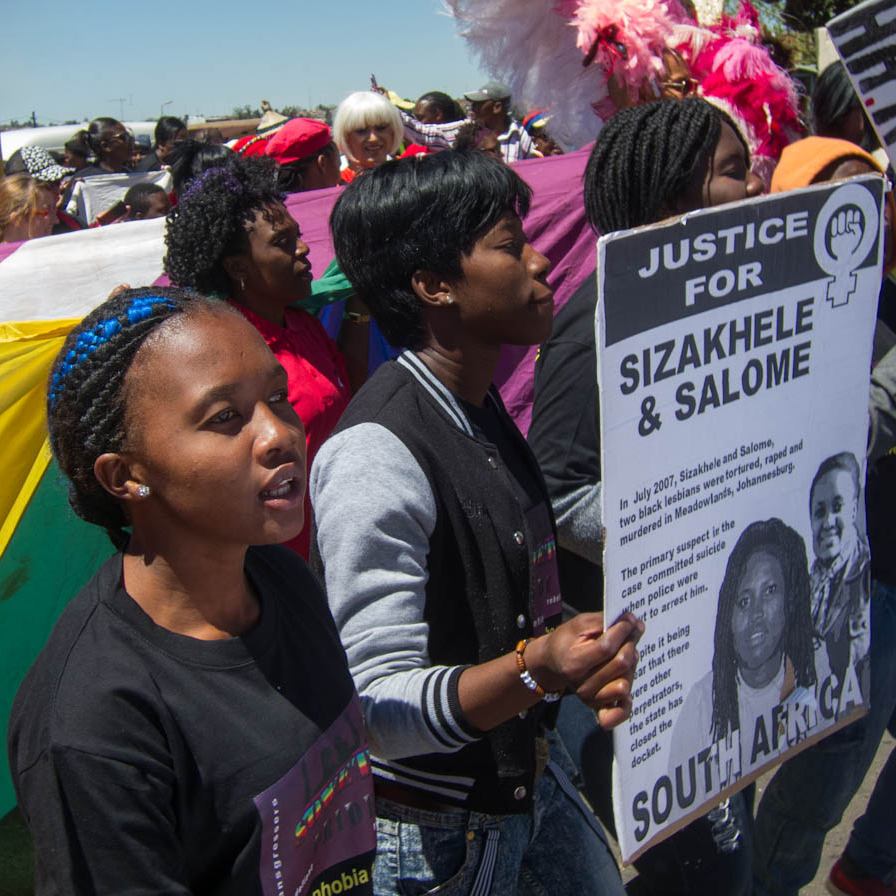
Soweto Pride 2012: A young person protests the murders of Sizakele Sigasa and Salome Masooa

- Two people were injured when Blah Bar, a gay bar in Cape Town, South Africa, was bombed in November 1999.
- Sizzlers massacre was a massacre that took place on January 20, 2003, at a gay massage parlour in Cape Town, South Africa. Nine men were brutally butchered to death and only one victim managed to escape. It was described by the High Court Judge and local police as one of the most vicious and bloodiest massacres the city of Cape Town had ever seen.
- In 2007 in Soweto, lesbian activist Sizakele Sigasa and her partner, Salome Masooa, were gang-raped and murdered.
- In Johannesburg, Gauteng, between 2011 and 2012 there were a number of serial killings that targeted eight gay men who were murdered in their homes in strikingly similar circumstances. The men were all found with their hands tied behind their backs and there was no forced entry. The police made a statement saying it was believed that these men were targeted by a gang using online dating websites in pretending to hook up with their victims and obtaining the trust of their victims who'd allow them into their homes. To this day, the case remains a mystery.
- In February 2021, Bonang Gaelae was killed by a stab to the neck. Her fiancé, a transgender man, believed she was murdered because killers perceived her to be a lesbian. He survived the attack.
- In March 2021, openly gay man Sphamandla Khoza was murdered and dumped in a ditch near his home in Inanda. He faced regular harassment for his sexuality, and family members believe the attack was a hate crime.
- In April 2021, the body of Andile Ntuthela, nicknamed Lulu, was found in a shallow grave in KwaNobuhle. He had been repeatedly stabbed. Ntuthela was a young gay man, and both police and LGBT activists suspected that his murder was a hate crime.
- The body of Anele Bhengu, a young lesbian, was found in a ditch in KwaMakhutha on June 13, 2021. She had been raped and stabbed in multiple places.
- On September 25, 2021, Sisanda Gumede's cousin killed her in Umbumbulu. Local LGBT organizations and Gumede's relatives believed the attack to be a hate crime. Sisanda Gumede was a lesbian and an activist for LGBTQ causes.
- On October 12, 2021, lesbian Limakatso Puling was shot and killed in Durban, KwaZulu-Natal. Her family suspects that the shooting was a hate crime.
- In February 2020, Mr. Lindokuhle Cele, an openly gay 23 year-old musician from UMlazi, Durban, was stabbed to death. He was stabbed 21 times in the back and on his face. His killer was a man known as Mvuyisi Mabhuthi Mogudu, who lived in the community, was known to the victim and had previously seen the victim at a night club. The victim died with a knife stuck in his left eye socket. The killer sustained visible cut wounds on his hands from the stabbing and was wearing cloth on his hands to cover the wounds. During his first court appearance, the post-mortem revealed that 18 of the 21 stab wounds that Mr. Cele suffered resulted in his death – they penetrated his face, lungs, heart and head. The killer was sentenced to 25 years by the Durban High Court for the crime.

== Spain ==
- Julio Anderson Luciano and his fiancé Isaac Ali Dani Peréz Triviño were killed on January 13, 2006, in the home they shared with Peréz Triviño's mother in the Spanish city of Vigo. Jacobo Piñeiro Rial, who stabbed them 22 and 35 times, respectively, then set fire to the home, was sentenced to 20 years imprisonment for arson and later was acquitted by a regional jury of murder charges on a "gay panic" defense, and on July 12, 2010, Piñeiro walked out of jail a free man. However, on September 26 a second jury found Piñeiro guilty of both murders as well as setting their place on fire and on October 14, 2010, he was sentenced to 58 years in jail, minus time already served (the maximum allowed time for this type of crime).

== Slovakia ==
- Juraj Vankulic and Matus Horwath were shot to death on October 12, 2022, by the radicalized teenage son of a far-right politician from an extremist party founded by Stefan Harabin - ex-Chief of highest court of Slovak Republic. The perpetrator was found dead next day morning. The incident came as a result of long term escalation of lobby of so-called "pro-family" and far-right parties.

== St. Maarten ==
- Richard Jefferson, senior producer of CBS Evening News, and Ryan Smith, producer-researcher of 48 Hours, both American, were severely beaten with a tire iron on April 6, 2006, outside the Sunset Beach Bar on the Caribbean island of St. Maarten. Three men and one woman were convicted and sentenced to prison for the attack, which was ruled a hate crime.

== Turkey ==
- Ahmet Yıldız, a gay man, was shot to death on July 15, 2008, in Istanbul.
- Hande Kader, a transgender woman, burned alive in August 2016 in Istanbul.

== Uganda ==
- David Kato, a prominent Ugandan gay rights activist, was beaten to death in his home on January 27, 2011. Kato had recently appeared on the front page of an anti-gay newspaper under the headline "Hang Them". Gay rights activists believe he was murdered for this reason, though the police say he was the victim of theft, not a hate crime.

== Ukraine ==
- Viktor Pylypenko, a prominent Ukrainian gay activist and soldier, has been the target of numerous physical assaults and harassment since becoming a well-known service member in the Russo-Ukrainian war. Notable attacks include a beating by a fellow serviceman, an assault by far-right militant Dmytro Korchynsky, who splashed a glass of water in Pylypenko's face during a TV debate, as well as harassment by having sexually explicit videos between Pylypenko and his boyfriend posted online without their consent, and another physical assault by pro-Ukraine Russian militant Denis Kapustin in August 2025 during a military funeral.

== United Kingdom ==
=== England and Wales ===
Some examples of severe acts of violence in England and Wales include the following cases:

- Kenneth Crowe, an English schoolteacher, aged 37, was found dead on 31 July 1950 in Rotherham, wearing her wife's clothes and a wig. She had approached a miner on her way home from the pub, who upon discovering Crowe was trans female, beat and strangled her. John Cooney was found not guilty of murder and sentenced to five years for manslaughter.
- George Brinham, an English trade unionist, was killed in November 1962 in his flat by a young man, who claimed that Brinham had propositioned him. The killer was found not guilty of murder and manslaughter on the grounds of "provocation".
- Christopher Schliach, a barrister who was gay, was murdered in his home in September 1989; he was stabbed more than 40 times.
- Henry Bright, a hotelier who was gay, was stabbed to death at his home in December 1989.
- William Dalziel, a hotel porter who was gay, was found unconscious on a roadside in Acton, west London in January 1990. He died from severe head injuries.
- Michael Boothe, an actor who was gay, died in April 1990 in west London, beaten to death by a gang of up to six men close to a public lavatory. The police said he had been the victim of "an extraordinarily severe beating, of a merciless and savage nature". He managed to give a description of his attackers before he died, and a reward of £15,000 was offered, but no one was caught, and the crime remains unsolved. The police review identified institutional homophobia within the Metropolitan Police as a factor.
- Colin Ireland, age 43, was jailed for life in 1993 for murdering five gay men. Ireland picked up the men at pubs in London, and then killed them in their own homes. A Scotland Yard review showed that Ireland's capture was hampered by institutional homophobia within the Metropolitan Police.
- Andrew Collier, a housing warden, aged 33, was one of Ireland's victims; the murder was classified as homophobic and linked with the death of Peter Walker, Ireland's first victim. The report said the police could have done more to warn the community of the links between the murders.
- Emanuel Spiteri, age 41, was strangled to death in his flat in Catford by Ireland, after meeting in a pub in Earls Court, west London.
- Nelson Asu, (1972-1996), was befriended by two older teenagers and returned to his flat in Toxteth with them. They threatened him with a knife, tied him up, choked him and gagged him and stuffed him in a trunk. They stole his belongings and left him to die a horrific death.
- Robyn Brown, a 23-year-old trans sex worker, was found stabbed to death in her flat in London on 28 February 1997. The original report described her as being 23-year-old Gemma Browne, formerly James Darwin Browne. The case went cold for over ten years, but her killer, James Hopkins, was eventually caught; in January 2009 he was jailed for life. The report found that identifying her to the public using different names may have hampered attempts to connect with relevant communities.

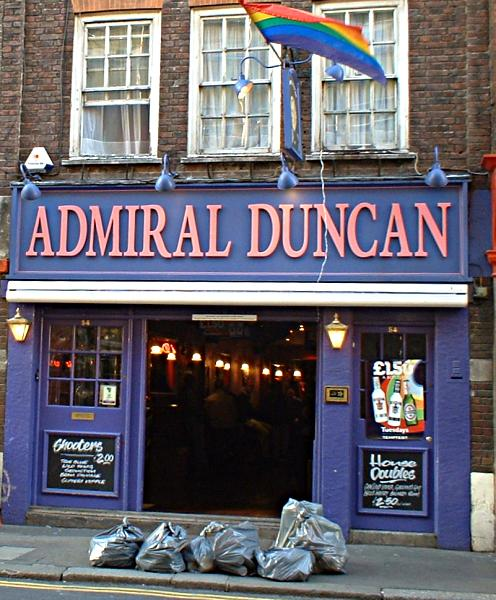
The London gay pub bombing in 1999 killed three and injured 70.

- In May 1999, the Admiral Duncan, a gay pub in Soho, was bombed by former British National Party member David Copeland, killing three people and wounding at least 70.
- Jaap Bornkamp, a 52-year-old florist, was knifed in a homophobic attack in south-east London in June 2000; the murder remains unsolved despite the police displaying 20 ft by 10 ft images of CCTV footage taken near the murder scene. He was attacked after leaving a night club, and the police are reported as saying there was no confrontation or argument, but that the attack was homophobic and unprovoked. The report found this case to have been a model of police good practice.
- Damilola Taylor was attacked by a local gang of youths on 27 November 2000 in Peckham, south London; he bled to death after being stabbed with a broken bottle in the thigh, which severed the femoral artery. The BBC, Telegraph, Guardian and Independent newspapers reported at the time that during the weeks between arriving in the UK from Nigeria and the attack he had been subjected to bullying and beating, which included homophobic remarks by a group of boys at his school. "The bullies told him that he was gay." He "may not have understood why he was being bullied at school, or why some other children taunted him about being 'gay' – the word meant nothing to him." He had to ask his mother what 'gay' meant, she said "Boys were swearing at him, saying lots of horrible words. They were calling him names." His mother had spoken about this bullying, but the teachers failed to take it seriously. "She said pupils had accused her son of being gay and had beaten him last Friday." Six months after the murder, his father said, "I spoke to him and he was crying that he was being bullied and being called names. He was being called 'gay'." In the New Statesman two years later, when there had still been no convictions for the crime, Peter Tatchell, gay human rights campaigner, said, "In the days leading up to his murder in south London in November 2000, he was subjected to vicious homophobic abuse and assaults," and asked why the authorities had ignored this before and after his death.
- Geoffrey Windsor, 57, in south London died in June 2002 from head injuries at Beaulieu Heights, a well-known gay cruising area, after he was beaten and robbed. The police said the murder was motivated by homophobia. A review of this and similar cases in the area highlighted poor policing due to institutional homophobia within the police, particularly in not taking previous attacks in the area more seriously.
- Lauren Harries, a trans woman and British media personality, was attacked in July 2005 along with her father and brother in their home in Cardiff by eight youths who shouted the word "tranny" while beating their victims. One youth pleaded guilty to inflicting grievous bodily harm and was sentenced to two years probation; his accomplices were not formally identified or charged.
- Jody Dobrowski was beaten to death on 14 October 2005 on Clapham Common in London by two men who perceived him as being gay; Dobrowski was beaten so badly he had to be identified by his fingerprints. Thomas Pickford and Scott Walker were given life sentences in what was described as a 'homophobic murder' in June 2006. This was the first prosecution in England and Wales where Section 146 of the Criminal Justice Act 2003 was used in sentencing the killers; this enabled the courts to impose a tougher sentence for offenses motivated or aggravated by the victim's sexual orientation, in this case a minimum of 30 years in prison.
- Mr Barry Rathbone, an openly gay priest, was attacked in April 2006. He was sitting in a park in Bournemouth, Dorset when Martin Powell and his girlfriend approached and spoke to him. Rathbone informed them that it was a cruising area, then Powell produced a 3-foot-long (0.91 m) metal baseball bat, called him a 'queer', and started to hit him, causing multiple injuries. Powell was subsequently jailed after plea bargaining down from attempted murder to assault occasioning serious bodily harm with intent and served 2 1/2 years in total. Rathbone publicly forgave Powell in an interview with the BBC.
- Michael Causer, 18, was attacked by a group of men on 25 July 2008 at a party in Liverpool, and died from his injuries. It is alleged that he was killed because he was gay.
- Daniel Jenkinson, 23, a gay hairdresser, was the victim of a homophobic attack on 23 October 2008 in a Preston club. His attacker, Neil Bibby, also from Preston, was sentenced to 200 hours' unpaid work, a three-month weekend curfew, and ordered to pay £2,000 compensation after he pleaded guilty to assault. Daniel needed facial reconstruction surgery after the attack, and said he was too scared to go out in the city.
- Gerry Edwards, 59, and his partner of over twenty years, Chris Bevan, 56, were stabbed by an assailant shouting homophobic abuse on 3 March 2009 in Bromley, south London. Gerry died from his injuries, and Chris was admitted to hospital in a critical condition. The police dealing with the case said they had an open mind, but were treating it as a homophobic murder. Two men were subsequently arrested.
- Sol Campbell, a footballer, was the target of disgruntled fans shouting homophobic abuse during a match. On 15 May 2009, an English court found two football fans guilty of shouting the homophobic chants. This was the first prosecution for indecent chanting in the UK. The police reported that up to 2,500 fans shouted chants at the match that included "Sol, Sol, wherever you may be, Not long now until lunacy, We won't give a fuck if you are hanging from a tree," the footballer commented "I felt totally victimised and helpless by the abuse I received on this day. It has had an effect on me personally". Three men and two boys were given cautions after the match.
- Brianna Ghey, 16, a transgender girl who was stabbed to death in Culcheth on 11 February 2023. The police described her murder as a "targeted attack". Two 15-year-olds, a boy and a girl, were charged with her murder. Prosecutor Leanne Gallagher said the attack on Ghey was "extremely brutal and punishing". Friends of Ghey said she was bullied at school because she was transgender, including being "gang beaten". Cheshire Police initially stated they had not found evidence to suggest Ghey's murder was a hate crime, but later said they were not eliminating any possibility from their investigation, including whether her murder was a hate crime. Some British media outlets were criticised for their coverage, in which they deadnamed and misgendered Ghey and failed to state that she was transgender. The trial of the two 15-year-olds charged with her murder began at Manchester Crown Court on 27 November 2023, and both were found guilty of her murder, receiving life sentences with a minimum term of 20 and 22 years respectively.
- Pixie Polite, 33, a British drag performer who competed on RuPaul's Drag Race UK series 4 was assaulted in Tesco on 28 July 2025 in what was deemed a homophobic attack in Colliers Wood, London.

=== Scotland ===
In 2009, the Scottish Parliament unanimously passed legislation that crimes motivated by hatred of gay or disabled people will be considered as 'aggravated offences' along with crimes motivated by religious or racial hatred.

- 6 April 1960. John Cremin, 48, was hit over the head with a flat piece of wood in Queen's Park, Glasgow by 19-year-old Anthony Miller after being lured from a public toilet by 16-year-old accomplice James Denovan. After being struck, he fell to the ground, where Cremin died due to massive haemorrhaging with a fractured skull. His assailants then stole his bank book, wallet, knife, and £67. Both were later arrested and found guilty of murder. Miller was executed on 22 December 1960 at Barlinnie Prison, the second lo last person executed in Scotland and the last teenager hanged in the United Kingdom before the abolition of the death penalty. Miller was buried within the grounds of Barlinnie, as was common practice at the time. Denovan, being 16, was too young to face the death penalty.
- Summer 1995. Michael Doran, 35 years old, was violently attacked and murdered in Queen's Park Glasgow by a gang of three boys and a girl that were on a queer bashing rampage. He received 83 blows to his body, was stabbed several times in the groin, stamped on, and broke every bone in his face. The gang then joined a nearby party and bragged about what they had done.
- April 2007. James Kerr, 51, a council worker, was attacked in South Inch Park, Perth, and later died at the hands of David Meehan, 19, and two accomplices. After the attack, the assailants went to a party. Meehan admitted murder and was sentenced to life in prison with a minimum of 16 years served, later reduced by two years on appeal. In 2022 Meehan failed in a judicial review for release. Accomplice Martin Soutar, 21, admitted culpable homicide and was ordered to serve 12 years. An unnamed 15-year-old accomplice was sentenced to one year.

=== Northern Ireland ===
- 2 June 1973. Samuel McCleave, 25, was found beaten, stabbed and hung from a railing by two passers-by, on Hill Street in Belfast. Sammy was walking home from a disco when he was supposedly attacked by a gang of Protestants. Anthony McCleave, 36 years old, Sammy's brother was also assassinated six years later on 3 June 1979. Both Sammy and Anthony were openly gay and well known members of the Northern Ireland Gay Rights Association.
- 7 February 1997. David J. Templeton, 43, was a minister of the Presbyterian church who was outed as a homosexual by the Sunday Life magazine. Templeton was viciously beaten in his home in Belfast in a Paramilitary punishment by three masked men of the UVF armed with baseball bats with a spike in them; the attack left Templeton with a fractured jaw and legs as well as cuts and abrasions to his arms and leg, he was admitted to the hospital soon after and released several weeks later but on 24 March he would die from thrombosis, which was caused by the injuries sustained over a month prior.
- 9 May 1997. Darren Bradshaw, 24, was an openly gay member of the Royal Ulster Constabulary who was in the Parliament Bar, which at the time was the only gay bar in Belfast, an unknown INLA gunman entered and shot Bradshaw three times.
- 23 March 2008. Shaun Fitzpatrick, 39, was a manager for a Spar supermarket who was found murdered in an alleyway in Dungannon. Fitzpatrick was murdered by two Lithuanian men, Andrius Dunauskas (23) and Ramunas Balseris (26), the two men said the only reason they killed Fitzpatrick was because he was gay.
- 18 April 2019. Lyra McKee, 29, was a journalist and gay rights activist who was assassinated by two New IRA gunmen, Gearoid Cavanagh (33) and Jordan Devine (21), during a riot in Derry.
- 3 December 2023. Odhrán Kelly, 23, was a nursing assistant who was found murdered near a burning car; two men were arrested for the murder, Shane Harte (31) and Gary Scullion (31), another three women were arrested for their involvement in disposing Kelly's body, Andrea Stevenson (43), Stephanie McClelland (36) and Crystal Redden (30) all three women were let out on bail, but Redden was brought back to court on 2 February 2024.

== United States ==
- On June 24, 1973, thirty-two people died of fire or smoke inhalation as the result of an arson attack on the UpStairs Lounge, a gay bar in New Orleans, Louisiana.
- Several men were assaulted on July 5, 1978, by a gang of youths armed with baseball bats and tree branches in an area of Central Park in New York City known to be frequented by homosexuals. The victims were assaulted at random, but the assailants later confessed that they had deliberately set out to the park to attack homosexuals. One of those injured was former figure skater Dick Button, who was assaulted while watching a fireworks display in the park.
- Harvey Milk, the openly gay San Francisco city supervisor, along with Mayor George Moscone, were assassinated on November 27, 1978, by political rival Dan White at San Francisco City Hall. Outrage over the assassinations and the short sentence given to White (seven years) prompted the White Night Riots.
- In March 1979, an assault on several women in a San Francisco lesbian bar by off-duty police officers drew national attention to the strained relationship between police and LGBT San Franciscans at that time. One woman was hospitalized for ten days with skull injuries.
- Tennessee Williams was the victim of an assault in January 1979 in Key West, being beaten by five teenage boys. He escaped serious injury. The episode was part of a spate of anti-gay violence inspired by an anti-gay newspaper ad run by a local Baptist minister.
- Steven Charles, 17, of Newark was beaten to death in New York City on October 7, 1979, by Costabile "Gus" Farace, Robert DeLicio, David Spoto and Farace's cousin Mark Granato. They also beat Charles' friend, 16-year-old Thomas Moore of Brooklyn. Moore was critically injured but managed to get help at a nearby residence. It was Moore that identified the four men via a lineup four days after the incident. Farace, the leader of the attack, pled guilty to first-degree manslaughter, and was paroled after 8 years, in 1988, then murdered on November 17, 1989.
- On November 19, 1980, Ronald K. Crumpley, a former Transit Authority policeman, fired 40 rounds from a semiautomatic rifle and two Magnum pistols (all stolen from a Virginia gun shop) into a cluster of men standing in front of two gay bars—Ramrod and the next-door Sneakers—in West Greenwich Village, killing 21-year-old Jörg Wenz, from the Netherlands, the Ramrod's doorman, and 32-year-old Vernon Kroening, from Minnesota, a church organist, and wounding six others. Rene Malute, 23, later died of his wounds. A survivor described the shootings as "a massacre, a bloodbath." Crumpley admitted to having paranoid delusions that gay men were agents of the devil, stalking him and "trying to steal my soul just by looking at me." He was found not responsible by reason of insanity and committed to maximum-security Kirby Forensic Psychiatric Center on Ward's Island. In 2001, a judge denied Crumpley's request to be transferred to a less restrictive psychiatric facility. He died in 2015.
- Charlie Howard was drowned in Bangor, Maine, in 1984.
- Anthony Milano was murdered on December 15, 1987, by Richard Laird and Frank Chester in Bucks County, Pennsylvania. Both men were sentenced to death. Chester was later resentenced to life without parole. The men murdered Milano because they believed he was gay.
- Rebecca Wight was murdered on May 13, 1988, when she and her partner, Claudia Brenner, were shot by Stephen Roy Carr while hiking and camping along the Appalachian Trail. Carr later claimed that he became enraged by the couple's lesbianism when he saw them having sex.
- Gordon Church was murdered on November 22, 1988, after he was kidnapped, raped, and tortured by Michael Archuleta and Lance Wood, in Millard County, Utah. Archuleta was sentenced to death for his role in the crime. Wood claimed they murdered Church because he was gay.
- James Zappalorti (1945–1990), a gay Vietnam War veteran, was stabbed to death.
- Paul Broussard (1964–1991), a Houston-area banker, was murdered.
- U.S. Navy Petty Officer Allen Schindler was murdered by a shipmate who stomped him to death in a public restroom in Japan on October 27, 1992. Schindler had complained repeatedly about anti-gay harassment aboard ship. The case became synonymous with the gays in the military debate that had been brewing in the United States culminating in the "Don't ask, don't tell" bill.
- Brandon Teena, a trans man, was raped and later murdered on December 31, 1993, when his birth gender was revealed by police to male friends of his. The events leading to Teena's death were depicted in the movie Boys Don't Cry.
- Scott Amedure was murdered on March 9, 1995, after revealing his attraction to his friend Jonathan Schmitz on an episode of The Jenny Jones Show titled "Revealing Same Sex Secret Crush". Schmitz purchased a shotgun to kill Amedure and did so after Amedure implied he still was attracted to him; Schmitz then turned himself in to police.
- Roxanne Ellis and Michelle Abdill, a lesbian couple in Medford, Oregon, were murdered on December 4, 1995, by a man who said he had "no compassion" for bisexual or homosexual people. Robert Acremant was convicted and sentenced to death by lethal injection.
- On December 5, 1997, Ali Forney was found by the police shot on the sidewalk in front of a housing project on East 131st Street. According to the New York Times she was the third young transgender prostitute murdered in Harlem in 14 months. The killing has never been solved.
- The Otherside Lounge, a lesbian nightclub in Atlanta, was bombed by Eric Robert Rudolph, the "Olympic Park Bomber," on February 21, 1997; five bar patrons were injured. In a statement released after he was sentenced to five consecutive life terms for his several bombings, Rudolph called homosexuality an "aberrant lifestyle".
- Matthew Shepard (1976–1998), a gay student, was fatally attacked in Laramie, Wyoming, on October 7, 1998. Shepard was tortured, beaten severely, tied to a fence, and abandoned; he was found 18 hours after the attack and succumbed to his injuries less than a week later, on October 12. His attackers, Russell Arthur Henderson and Aaron James McKinney, are both serving two consecutive life sentences in prison.
- Billy Jack Gaither was murdered by two acquaintances on February 19, 1999, in Alabama. The killers later admitted that they murdered Gaither because he was gay.
- Gary Matson and Winfield Mowder, a gay couple, were murdered on July 1, 1999, by white supremacist brothers Matthew and Tyler Williams in Redding, California. Tyler Williams was sentenced to a minimum of 33 years in prison, to be served after his completion of a 21-year sentence for firebombing synagogues and an abortion clinic. Benjamin Williams claimed that by killing the couple he was "obeying the laws of the Creator". He died by suicide in 2003 while awaiting trial. Their former pastor described the brothers as "zealous in their faith" but "far from kooks".
- U.S. Army Pfc. Barry Winchell was murdered on July 6, 1999, in Fort Campbell, Kentucky, by fellow soldier Calvin Glover. Winchell was beaten to death with a baseball bat after rumors spread on base of his relationship with transgender author Calpernia Addams. Glover was sentenced to life in prison.
- Steen Fenrich was murdered in September 1999, apparently by his stepfather, John D. Fenrich, in Queens, New York. His dismembered remains were found in March 2001, with the phrase "gay nigger number one" scrawled on his skull along with his social security number. His stepfather fled from police while being interviewed, then killed himself.
- Arthur Warren was punched and kicked to death by two teenage boys on July 3, 2000, in Grant Town, West Virginia, who reportedly believed Warren had spread a rumor that he and one of the boys, David Allen Parker, had a sexual relationship. Warren's killers ran over his body to disguise the murder as a hit-and-run. Parker pleaded guilty and was sentenced to "life in prison with mercy", making him eligible for parole after 15 years. His accomplice, Jared Wilson, was sentenced to 20 years.
- Ronald Gay entered a gay bar in Roanoke, Virginia, on September 22, 2000, and opened fire on the patrons, killing Danny Overstreet, 43 years old, and severely injuring six others. Ronald said he was angry over what his name now meant, and deeply upset that three of his sons had changed their surname. He claimed that he had been told by God to find and kill lesbians and gay men, describing himself as a "Christian Soldier working for my Lord"; Gay testified in court that "he wished he could have killed more fags," before several of the shooting victims as well as Danny Overstreet's family and friends.
- Nizah Morris, a trans woman, was the victim of a possible homicide in December 2002 in Philadelphia, Pennsylvania.
- Gwen Araujo, a trans woman, was murdered on October 4, 2002, by at least three men who were charged with committing a hate crime. Two were convicted of murder, the third manslaughter; however, the jury rejected the hate crime enhancement.
- Sakia Gunn, a 15-year-old lesbian, was murdered on May 11, 2003, in Newark, New Jersey. While waiting for a bus, Gunn and her friends were propositioned by two men. When the girls rejected their advances, declaring themselves to be lesbians, the men attacked them. One of the men, Richard McCullough, fatally stabbed Gunn. In exchange for his pleading guilty to several lesser crimes including aggravated manslaughter, prosecutors dropped murder charges against McCullough, who was sentenced to 20 years.
- Guin "Richie" Phillips of Elizabethtown, Kentucky, was killed on June 17, 2003, by Joseph Cottrell. His body was later found in a suitcase in Rough River Lake. During his trial, two of Cottrell's relatives testified that he lured Phillips to his death, and killed him because he was gay. Cottrell was convicted of manslaughter and sentenced to 20 years in prison.
- Nireah Johnson and Brandie Coleman were shot to death on July 23, 2003, by Paul Moore when Moore learned after a sexual encounter that Johnson was transgender. Moore then burned his victims' bodies. He was convicted of murder and sentenced to 120 years in prison.
- Scotty Joe Weaver was an 18-year-old murder victim from Bay Minette, Alabama, whose burned and partially decomposed body was discovered on July 22, 2004, a few miles from the mobile home in which he lived. He was beaten, strangled and stabbed numerous times, partially decapitated, and his body was doused in gasoline and set on fire.
- Ronnie Antonio Paris, a three-year-old boy living in Tampa, Florida, died on January 28, 2005, due to brain injuries inflicted by his father, Ronnie Paris Jr. According to his mother and other relatives, Ronnie Paris Jr., repeatedly slammed his son into walls, slapped the child's head, and "boxed" him because he was concerned the child was gay and would grow up a sissy. Paris was sentenced to thirty years in prison.
- Jason Gage, an openly gay man, was murdered on March 11, 2005, in his Waterloo, Iowa apartment by an assailant, Joseph Lawrence, who claimed Gage had made sexual advance to him. Gage was bludgeoned to death with a bottle, and stabbed in the neck, probably post-mortem, with a shard of glass. Lawrence was sentenced to fifty years in prison.
- 18-year-old Jacob D. Robida entered a bar on February 2, 2006, in New Bedford, Massachusetts, confirmed that it was a gay bar, and then attacked patrons with a hatchet and a handgun, wounding three. He fatally shot himself three days later.
- Kevin Aviance, a female impressionist, musician, and fashion designer, was robbed and beaten in Manhattan on June 10, 2006, by a group of men who yelled anti-gay slurs at him. Four assailants pleaded guilty and received prison sentences.
- Six men were attacked with baseball bats and knives on July 30, 2006, after leaving the San Diego, California Gay Pride festival. One victim was injured so severely that he had to undergo extensive facial reconstructive surgery. Three men pleaded guilty in connection with the attacks and received prison sentences. A 15-year-old juvenile also pleaded guilty.
- An altercation occurred in Manhattan on August 18, 2006, between a man and seven black lesbians from Newark, New Jersey. During the altercation, the man was stabbed. The women claim that they acted in self-defense after he screamed homophobic epithets, spit on them, and pulled one of their weaves off, while he has described the attack as "a hate crime against a straight man."
- Michael Sandy was attacked on October 8, 2006, by four young heterosexual men who lured him into meeting after chatting online, while they were looking for gay men to rob. He was struck by a car while trying to escape his attackers, and died five days later without regaining consciousness.
- Andrew Anthos, a 72-year-old disabled gay man, was beaten with a lead pipe by a man who was shouting anti-gay names at him on February 27, 2007, in Detroit, Michigan. Anthos died 10 days later in the hospital.
- Sean William Kennedy, 20, was walking to his car from Brew's Bar in Greenville, South Carolina, on May 16, 2007, when Stephen Andrew Moller, 18, got out of another car and approached Kennedy. Investigators said that Moller made a comment about Kennedy's sexual orientation, and threw a fatal punch because he did not like the other man's sexual preference.
- Duanna Johnson, a transsexual woman, was held down by Officer James Swain and beaten and pepper-sprayed at close quarters by Officer Bridges McRae on February 12, 2008, while she was awaiting booking in the Shelby County Criminal Justice Center in Tennessee. Johnson said the officers reportedly called her a "faggot" and "he-she", before and during the incident. On November 6, 2008, she was found dead in the street, reportedly gunned down by three unknown individuals.
- Lawrence "Larry" King, a 15-year-old junior high school student, was shot twice by a classmate at E.O. Green School in Oxnard, California, on February 12, 2008. He was taken off life support after doctors declared him brain dead on February 15. According to Associated Press reports, "prosecutors have charged a 14-year-old classmate with premeditated murder with hate-crime and firearm-use enhancements".
- Angie Zapata, an 18-year-old trans woman, was beaten to death on July 17, 2008, in Colorado, two days after meeting Allen Ray Andrade. The case was prosecuted as a hate crime, and Andrade was found guilty of first degree murder on April 22, 2009.
- Nima Daivari, 26, was attacked by a man who called him "faggot" on September 13, 2008, in Denver, Colorado. The police that arrived on the scene refused to make a report of the attack.
- A Bourbonnais, Illinois elementary school bus driver was charged with leading a homophobic attack on a 10-year-old student passenger on September 15, 2008. The boy was taunted by the driver who then encouraged other students to chase and beat the child.
- Lateisha Green, a 22-year-old transgender woman, was shot and killed by Dwight DeLee on November 14, 2008, in Syracuse, New York, because he thought she was gay. Local news media reported the incident with her legal name, Moses "Teish" Cannon. DeLee was convicted of first-degree manslaughter as a hate crime on July 17, 2009, and received the maximum sentence of 25 years in state prison. This was only the second time in the nation's history that a person was prosecuted for a hate crime against a transgender person and the first hate crime conviction in New York state.
- Carl Joseph Walker-Hoover, an 11-year-old child in Springfield, Massachusetts, hanged himself with an extension cord on April 6, 2009, after being bullied all school year by peers who said "he acted feminine" and was gay.
- Justin Goodwin, 36, of Salem, Massachusetts, was attacked and beaten on April 10, 2009, by as many as six people outside a bar in Gloucester, Massachusetts. Goodwin suffered a shattered jaw, broken eye socket, broken nose and broken cheekbone. Goodwin later died by suicide.
- Seaman August Provost was found shot to death and his body burned at his guard post on Camp Pendleton on June 30, 2009. LGBT community leaders "citing military sources initially said that Provost's death was a hate crime." Provost had been harassed because of his sexual orientation. Military leaders have since explained that "whatever the investigation concludes, the military's "Don't ask, don't tell" policy prevented Provost from seeking help." Family and friends believe he was murdered because he was openly gay (or bisexual according to some family and sources); the killer died by suicide a week later after admitting the murder. The Navy has not concluded if this was a hate crime.
- CeCe McDonald, a young African American transgender woman, was attacked outside a tavern shortly after midnight on June 5, 2011, in Minneapolis, Minnesota. McDonald then fatally stabbed Dean Schmitz, who was in the group but not the attacker, with a pair of scissors, and was subsequently convicted of manslaughter and jailed for 19 months in a men's prison.
- Mark Carson, a 32-year-old gay man, was shot to death by a man who trailed and taunted him and a friend as they walked down the street in Greenwich Village, New York, yelling anti-gay slurs and asking one of them, "You want to die tonight?" Elliot Morales was arrested shortly after the shooting and charged with murder and weapons charges on May 19, 2013.
- In March 2014, John Patrick Masterson, an openly gay rapper professionally known as Jipsta was attacked in a New York City subway station as he and his partner were celebrating their 10-year anniversary. The assailant began calling the couple homophobic slurs, and following a verbal disagreement, Jipsta was beaten by the unidentified subject, resulting in multiple fractures to his face. As a result of the incident, Jipsta required surgery due to seven broken bones sustained to his nose and eye socket, which forced him to cease promotion of his second album Turnt Up.
- 49 people were killed, and 53 injured, in a shooting at an Orlando gay nightclub on June 12, 2016.
- Muhlaysia Booker, an African-American transgender woman, was murdered on May 18, 2019, one month after she had been severely beaten by a mob of men following a minor traffic accident. The April 12 beating in Dallas garnered national attention as it had been recorded and posted on social media.
- Kylen Schulte and Crystal Turner, an American married lesbian couple, were murdered on August 13, 2021, by a man named Adam Pinkusiewicz, who later committed suicide, before it was discovered that he was the killer.
- 5 people were killed, and 25 injured, in a shooting at a Colorado gay nightclub on November 19–20, 2022.
- On July 29, 2023, O'Shae Sibley, a 28-year-old gay man, was stabbed and later died outside a gas station in Brooklyn, New York. The suspect responsible for the stabbing was identified as a 17-year-old, who turned himself into police custody on August 4, 2023, and was later charged with second-degree murder as a hate crime.
- On February 7, 2024, Nex Benedict, an openly non-binary sixteen-year-old, was attacked in a school bathroom. They died the following day.
- On June 1, 2025, Jonathan Joss, an openly gay actor, musician and comedian, was fatally shot after returning to his burned-down former home to collect his mail. Once there, he discovered the skull and harness of one of his missing dogs. Upon breaking down crying in distress, Sigfredo Ceja Alvarez approached the two, shouting violent homophobic slurs, eventually shooting the unarmed Jonathan Joss fatally, leading to his untimely death.
- On September 26, 2025, Tiara Tori Love Jackson, a transgender woman, was shot to death in Charlotte, North Carolina.
- On March 13, 2026, Shyyell Diamond Sanchez-McCray, a forty-two year old drag performer and activist, was shot to death in Petersburg, Virginia.
- On August 31, 2026, a shooting at a gay bar in Tuscon left three people dead, including the perpetrator. The shooting is being investigated as an anti-LGBTQ hate crime.

== See also ==
- Hate crime
- Security of person
