= Duck Den murder =

1997 murder of brothel owner in Singapore

Philip Low
- Philip Low
- Born: Low Cheng Quee c. 1932; Singapore, Straits Settlements
- Died: 20 June 1997 (aged 65); Balestier, Singapore
- Cause of death: Fatal injuries to the skull
- Other name: Philip Low
- Occupation: Brothel owner
- Known for: Murder victim
- Spouse: Unnamed wife

On 20 June 1997, a 65-year-old Singaporean and retiree Low Cheng Quee (Chinese: 刘振贵; pinyin: Líu Zhènguì; Pe̍h-ōe-jī: Lâu Chín-kùi), also known as Philip Low, was found dead inside the bedroom of his Jalan Rajah flat, where he operated a homosexual brothel, which was colloquially known as a "duck den", which thus coined the case's name as the Duck Den murder. Through the police investigations and interview of two witnesses (who found the body), the police identified Lim Chin Chong (Chinese: 林振冲; pinyin: Lín Zhènchōng; Pe̍h-ōe-jī: Lîm Chín-chhiong), (Note: His name was also spelt as 林振崇 Lín Zhènchóng, 林清崇 Lín Qīngchóng, and 林振忠 Lín Zhènzhōng) an 18-year-old Malaysian prostitute who worked at Low's brothel, as the prime suspect behind Low's murder.

Lim, who fled to Malaysia after committing the crime, was arrested by the Royal Malaysia Police twenty days later in Johor Bahru, and he was extradited back to Singapore to be charged with murder in relation to Low's death. In contrast to witnesses' claims that he intended to rob Low, Lim denied that he intended to commit robbery and stated he was gravely provoked into killing Low due to him resisting Low's sexual advances and the death threats Low issued to him. This led to him hitting Low on the head with a wooden block and killing him. Despite this defence and Lim's second defence of diminished responsibility, the High Court judged that Lim was not suffering from any abnormality of the mind and thus found Lim guilty of murder, which resulted in Lim receiving the death penalty for his offence.

== Murder and investigations ==
On 20 June 1997, at a fourth-floor unit of a private flat at Jalan Rajah, Balestier Road, a 65-year-old Singaporean-Chinese man was found dead inside one of the unit's bedrooms. The man's head was wrapped up with cloth, which was stained with blood, and his limbs were tied up, as well as a denture placed onto the covered head and a bloodstained wooden block placed nearby the corpse. Prior to the gruesome discovery, the police received an emergency phone call, which stated that the deceased man, who was still alive at that time, was about to be killed, and by the time of the police's arrival, it was too late as the man was dead.

The man was later identified as a former shoe shop employee and retiree named Low Cheng Quee, also known as Philip Low, and he was the owner of an illegal male brothel (or duck den). Low often used the flat to hire several young men, mostly Thais and Malaysians, to work as male prostitutes and provide sexual services for male customers. Low would also receive a share of the earnings received by his prostitutes. Low's wife, who lived in their matrimonial home near the flat and had one child with Low, reportedly told the court that she did not know of her husband's double life, partly due to their lack of communication and marital issues at home.

There were two other people present in the flat when Low was murdered. These two men - Thai male prostitute Sajai Karakot and Low's mute friend Chan Kok Leong - gave statements to the police that before Low was killed, they saw one of Low's freelance prostitutes, an 18-year-old Malaysian named Lim Chin Chong, together on the bed with Low, and Lim drove them away from the bedroom before Low's death and Lim's disappearance. Sajai also testified that prior to this incident, Lim told him he wanted to rob Low and showed signs of suspicious behaviour before entering Low's bedroom. Lim was thus classified as the prime suspect behind Low's death.

After he committed the crime, Lim fled Singapore. Fearful of being caught at the Woodlands Checkpoint, Lim approached a friend for help to leave Singapore, and he paid S$300 to depart from Lim Chu Kang by boat. Lim Chin Chong went into hiding in Malaysia for the next twenty days, seeking refuge in the homes of his friends and relatives. However, on 9 July 1997, when Lim was at a shopping mall in Johor Bahru, waiting to meet a friend from Singapore for a loan of S$500, he was arrested by the Royal Malaysia Police, and handed over to the Singapore Police Force. Three days later, after he was extradited back to Singapore, Lim was charged with murder, which was considered a capital offence in Singapore.

== Trial of Lim Chin Chong ==
=== Background ===
Lim Chin Chong

Born on 20 October 1978 in the Malaysian state of Penang, Lim Chin Chong was given away for adoption when he was merely two years old. Lim's adoptive mother died when he was four, and his foster father remarried when he was six. Lim did not have a good relationship with his adoptive step-mother, who often physically abused him. Eventually, when he reached his adolescence, Lim left his home to live in Kuala Lumpur and became independent. At age 15 or 16, Lim, who resigned from his stall assistant job, was recruited by a modelling school for massage jobs, which also included sexual services, and in return, Lim would receive a high income. As a result, Lim was recruited into prostitution.

Lim first came to Singapore in March 1996, and came to work under Philip Low. Lim would work as a freelance male prostitute at Low's brothel from time to time whenever he needed more money while he was doing other jobs on the outside. Although he often came into contact with male clients during prostitution, Lim was in fact heterosexual and he disliked homosexuality. Lim's girlfriend, whose surname was Sim, supported this fact when she testified on the stand during her boyfriend's trial, telling the court that Lim told her he hated homosexual people, and he openly showed his disgust towards them during the couple's past encounter with a group of homosexual people at a karaoke. Lim only did the job due to his desperate need for money and thought of working as a prostitute until he found better jobs and achieved a more stable income.

=== Criminal proceedings ===
==== Reunion with birth mother and the prosecution's case ====
On 24 November 1997, 19-year-old Lim Chin Chong stood trial in the High Court for the murder of his 65-year-old employer Philip Low Cheng Quee, with High Court judge Kan Ting Chiu hearing the case. Lim was represented by defence lawyer Luke Lee while the prosecution in charge of his case was led by Deputy Public Prosecutor (DPP) Lee Sing Lit (who would also prosecute convicted maid abuser Ng Hua Chye in 2002) of the Attorney-General's Chambers (AGC). During the course of the trial, the case, which became known as the Duck Den murder case, caused sensation among the public given the presence of homosexual brothels and several unnatural aspects of the case.

The murder trial of Lim also marked the first time Lim reunited with his biological mother Yong Ah Khiau (杨亚娇 Yáng Yàjiāo). Yong, who affectionately regarded her son as "Little Wen Wen" (小文文 Xiăo Wénwén) when he was young, came to the courtroom daily to witness the trial proceedings, to show support for her son, whom she had not seen for the past 17 years. Yong confirmed to the court that her son was exactly 18 years and eight months old at the time he murdered Low. Given the fact that Lim had already reached his 18th birthday when he killed Low, Lim would still face the death penalty if found guilty of murder under Singapore law. The laws of Singapore back then also dictated that if a minor aged below 18 was found guilty of murder, the convict would not face capital punishment but would be serving indefinite detention under the President's Pleasure.

During Lim's trial, both Low's friend Chan Kok Leong and Low's hired prostitute Sajai Karakot, who were present at the flat, appeared as witnesses for the prosecution. Lim's girlfriend also appeared in court to testify for the prosecution that Lim confessed to killing Low when he met her on the night of the murder prior to his escape from Singapore. The forensic pathologist, Dr Wee Keng Poh, testified that during his post-mortem examination of Low's corpse, he found injuries on the skull and face, and there were at least six to seven blows inflicted by a blunt object onto the head. Dr Wee stated that the facial injuries were consistent with being caused by several punches, and he stated that the severity of the injuries on Low's skull would have been fatal enough to cause death within minutes. He also stated that the denture, which was found on the covered head of Low, could have fallen off during the assault and it was placed onto the head after Low's head was covered at the end of the assault.

==== Lim's account and psychiatric evidence ====
On 26 November 1997, Lim Chin Chong elected to go on the stand and give his account of the crime. Lim told the court that on that night, Lim approached Philip Low in his bedroom while he was sleeping, wanting to take back the S$50 he earned, and asked for more customers. Low, who was awakened, then offered to be the customer, asking Lim to provide him "full service", including kissing and performing anal sex on Lim. However, Lim, given his aversion and hatred towards homosexuality, rejected the offer and Low's sexual advances. It made Low threaten Lim that he would send his friends from the secret society to assault Lim if Lim did not let him kiss him and perform anal sex on him. This caused Lim to go to the kitchen to retrieve a wooden block to hit Low on the head. However, Low continued to mouth humiliating comments and verbal threats towards Lim, which further enraged Lim to tying Low's limbs with radio wires and covering up Low's head with some clothing to prevent him from struggling, shouting and glaring at him. Afterwards, Lim continued to repeatedly assault Low with the wooden block, causing Low to die from head injuries. Lim added that he felt regret for killing Low and stated that he did not know of Low's death until reading the paper, which caused him to escape to Malaysia.

Lim's lawyer Luke Lee called upon a private psychiatrist, Dr R Nagulendran, to testify that Lim was suffering from acute adjustment disorder, as a result of his broken childhood, the mental struggles of providing sexual services to males despite being heterosexual, and other significant stressors, which caused him to harbour great fear, stress and distress. Dr Nagulendran stated that the sexual advances and verbal threats issued by Low amounted to stressors that provoked an emotional outburst from Lim, making him, under the influence of the disorder, express uncontrollable anger and significant violence in retaliation to the provocation caused by Lim. Dr Nagulendran thus concluded his report with the result that Lim suffered from diminished responsibility. If Lim could prove that he was indeed suffering from substantial impairment of his mental faculties at the time of the killing, he would face the maximum term of life imprisonment or up to ten years' jail for a lower charge of culpable homicide not amounting to murder (or manslaughter).

However, DPP Lee Sing Lit rebutted during his cross-examination of Lim that during the time of the offence, both Low and Lim was fully-clothed. He put it to the court that Lim, who harboured ill-feelings towards homosexuals, had endured them and was used to providing such services to his male customers at the brothel, hence such offers of anal sex from Low should not have been something that provoked Lim and cause him to violently attack Low. During DPP Lee's cross-examination, Lim kept evading questions and kept replying that he "did not know" when he was told he should have just left the room if he felt annoyed or repulsed at Low's offer.

Also, the prosecution's psychiatrist, Dr Chan Keen Loong, disputed Lim's claims of diminished responsibility by explaining that adjustment disorders were caused by significant life-changing events like divorce or business difficulties, although these events were normally encountered in daily life. He stated that Lim's claims of unwanted kissing could "hardly be termed as a life event" and was more of an unwanted nuisance instead of provocation. Dr Chan said that given his line and nature of work as a prostitute, Lim should have expected he would receive such sexual offers. Dr Chan also stated adjustment disorders were mild disorders which did not normally come with symptoms like violence, and patients with adjustment disorders would be tied down and helpless in stressful situations. In Dr Chan's opinion, in contrast to those suffering from adjustment disorders, Lim exhibited extreme violence, and he was able to have self-control and could make a choice in such a situation, and be able to resist and attack Low when he was faced with threats and sexual advances.

=== Death penalty verdict ===
On 1 December 1997, at the end of the Duck Den murder trial, which lasted six days, the trial judge Kan Ting Chiu issued his verdict.

In his judgement, Justice Kan stated that he rejected Lim Chin Chong's defence of sudden and grave provocation, because Lim was able to coherently recount how he committed the crime and knew what he was doing, as demonstrated from his actions before, during and after the murder, and he still had significant self-control over his actions. He pointed out that Lim was able to go look for weapons take additional steps to prevent Philip Low from moving, shouting and glaring at him, as well as cleaning himself up after the murder and having told his girlfriend that he killed Low. It showed that Lim had the consciousness to arm himself with weapons and proceed to assault Low, which did not support the fact that he was gravely provoked into killing Low.

Based on these actions, the judge accepted the prosecution's psychiatric report that Lim was not suffering from acute adjustment disorder, and thus could not be eligible for the defence of diminished responsibility. Since these two defences did not work in Lim's favour, Justice Kan concluded Lim's trial with a guilty verdict of murder. As a result of this judgement, 19-year-old Lim Chin Chong was convicted and consequently sentenced to death by hanging. Lim's biological mother Yong Ah Khiau was reportedly distraught at the guilty verdict of death issued against her son.

== Lim's execution ==
On 13 April 1998, Lim Chin Chong's appeal against his sentence was dismissed by the Court of Appeal. Upon receiving news of Lim's loss in his appeal, Amnesty International appealed to the government of Singapore to grant Lim clemency and commute his sentence to life imprisonment in June 1998, stating that he should not be executed on the basis that he committed the murder while suffering from a mental disorder.

On 23 October 1998, 20-year-old Lim Chin Chong was hanged at Changi Prison at dawn.

In the aftermath, Singaporean crime show True Files re-enacted the duck den murder case and it first aired on 30 September 2003 as the sixth episode of the show's second season.

== See also ==
- Capital punishment in Singapore
- List of major crimes in Singapore
- Violence against LGBT people
- List of acts of violence against LGBT people
