= Frank Chester =

Frank Chester may refer to:

- Frank Chester (politician) (1901–1966), Canadian politician
- Frank Chester (umpire) (1895–1957), English cricketer and umpire
- Frank Chester (artist), creator of the Chestahedron, a type of diminished trapezohedron
- Frank Chester (murderer), American murderer convicted in the murder of Anthony Milano

== See also ==
- Frank Chester Robertson (1890–1969), American author
- F. G. L. Chester (Francis Chester, 1899–1946), British soldier
- Chester (disambiguation)
