= Killing of O'Shae Sibley =

2023 killing in Brooklyn, New York

- Location: 40.6104°N 73.9622°W; Midwood, Brooklyn, New York, U.S.
- Date: July 29, 2023 c. 11:00 p.m. (EST)
- Attack type: Stabbing, violence against LGBTQ people
- Deaths: 1
- Victim: O'Shae Sibley
- Perpetrator: Dmitry Popov: Criminal possession of a weapon
- Convictions: Manslaughter as a hate crime Second-degree menacing Second-degree aggravated harassment Fourth-degree criminal possession of a weapon

On July 29, 2023, O'Shae Sibley, a 28-year-old gay man, was stabbed and killed by 17-year-old Dmitry Popov outside of a Mobil gas station in Midwood, Brooklyn, New York, United States. He and his friends were confronted by a group of individuals for playing Beyoncé music and voguing. Popov turned himself in to police custody on August 4, 2023, and was later charged with second-degree murder as a hate crime. In 2026, Popov was convicted of manslaughter as a hate crime but acquitted of murder, and subsequently sentenced to 20 years imprisonment.

== Background ==
The victim, 28-year-old O'Shae Sibley, was a professional dancer and choreographer born on September 1, 1994. He was one of eleven siblings in his family. Prior to moving from Philadelphia to Brownsville, Brooklyn in 2020 to pursue career opportunities, he had been a part of Philadanco since his teenage years. As a part of an all-queer dance group that he joined for a video project called "Vogue 4 #BlackLivesMatter", he performed at Lincoln Center. According to those who knew Sibley, he regularly danced in public. Sibley used his dance skills not only for artistic purposes, but to advocate for social change as well.

== Incident ==
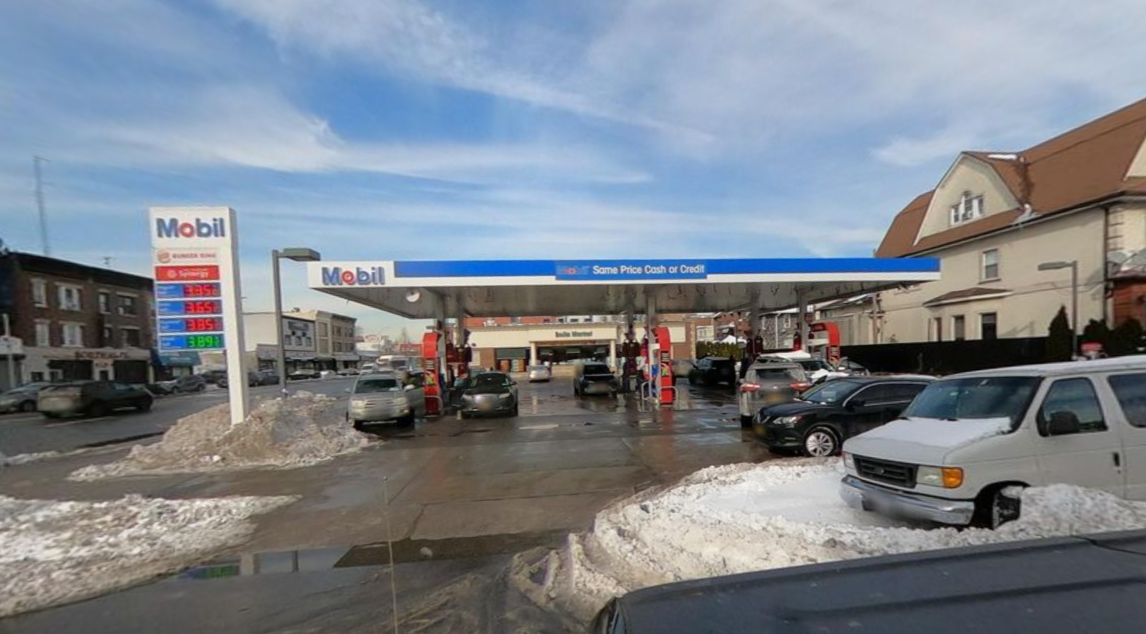
The Mobil gas station on Coney Island Avenue, where the incident took place (pictured January 2022)

On the evening of July 29, Sibley, accompanied by a group of friends, had been refueling their vehicle at a Mobil gas station on Coney Island Avenue in Midwood, Brooklyn, New York, following a day spent beachgoing at the Jersey Shore to celebrate a friend's birthday. Sibley and his friends were playing Renaissance by Beyoncé and vogueing, when a group of people, including then 17-year-old Dmitry Popov, exited the convenience store and approached them, telling them to stop dancing while hurling homophobic slurs and racist statements against them, and accused them of being offensive to their religion. A witness quoted one member of the group who said "we're Muslim, I don't want you dancing", though Popov was later reported to be Christian. Sibley then confronted the group and attempted to deescalate the situation. An argument ensued and Sibley was stabbed by Popov. Sibley sustained a stab wound to the torso and, after receiving first aid from his friends, was rushed to Maimonides Medical Center, where he was later pronounced dead. Otis Pena, a friend of Sibley who was with him at the time of his killing, said "they murdered him because he was gay, because he stood up for his friends," in a video posted to Facebook.

Shortly following the stabbing, a GoFundMe was created by Sibley's father to fund his funeral. On August 8, 2023, Sibley's funeral was held in Philadelphia, where he grew up.

== Trial and conviction ==
The accused was described as a teenager with dark hair, wearing a black shirt and red shorts. The incident was prosecuted as a hate crime by NYPD detectives. The suspect, a 17-year-old high school student who was seen fighting Sibley on surveillance footage prior to his stabbing, turned himself in to the police with his attorney on August 4, 2023. It was originally reported that during the altercation, the suspect claimed he identified as Muslim and said that he took offense to Sibley's dancing. Later, the suspect's lawyer informed media that his client is a Christian. According to a witness, the accused as well as those with him said homophobic slurs. He was charged with second-degree murder as a hate crime as well as criminal possession of a weapon, and was held without bail. He pleaded not guilty, and was charged as an adult. A Brooklyn jury found 20-year-old Dmitriy Popov guilty of first-degree manslaughter, and on 16 July 2026, he was sentenced to 20 years imprisonment by Brooklyn Supreme Court Judge Dena Douglas.

== Reactions ==
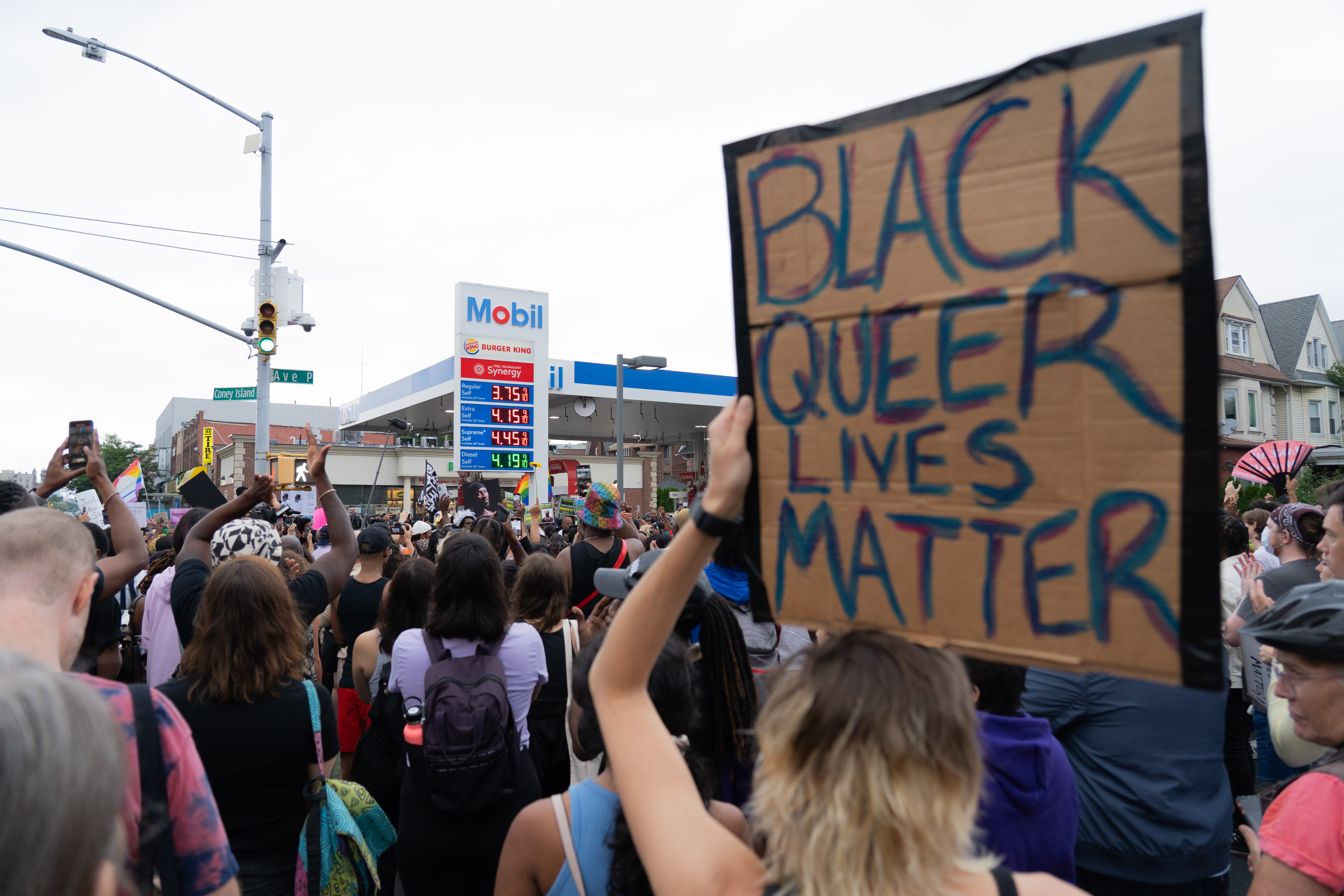
People gather at a vigil for O'Shae Sibley in Midwood, Brooklyn.

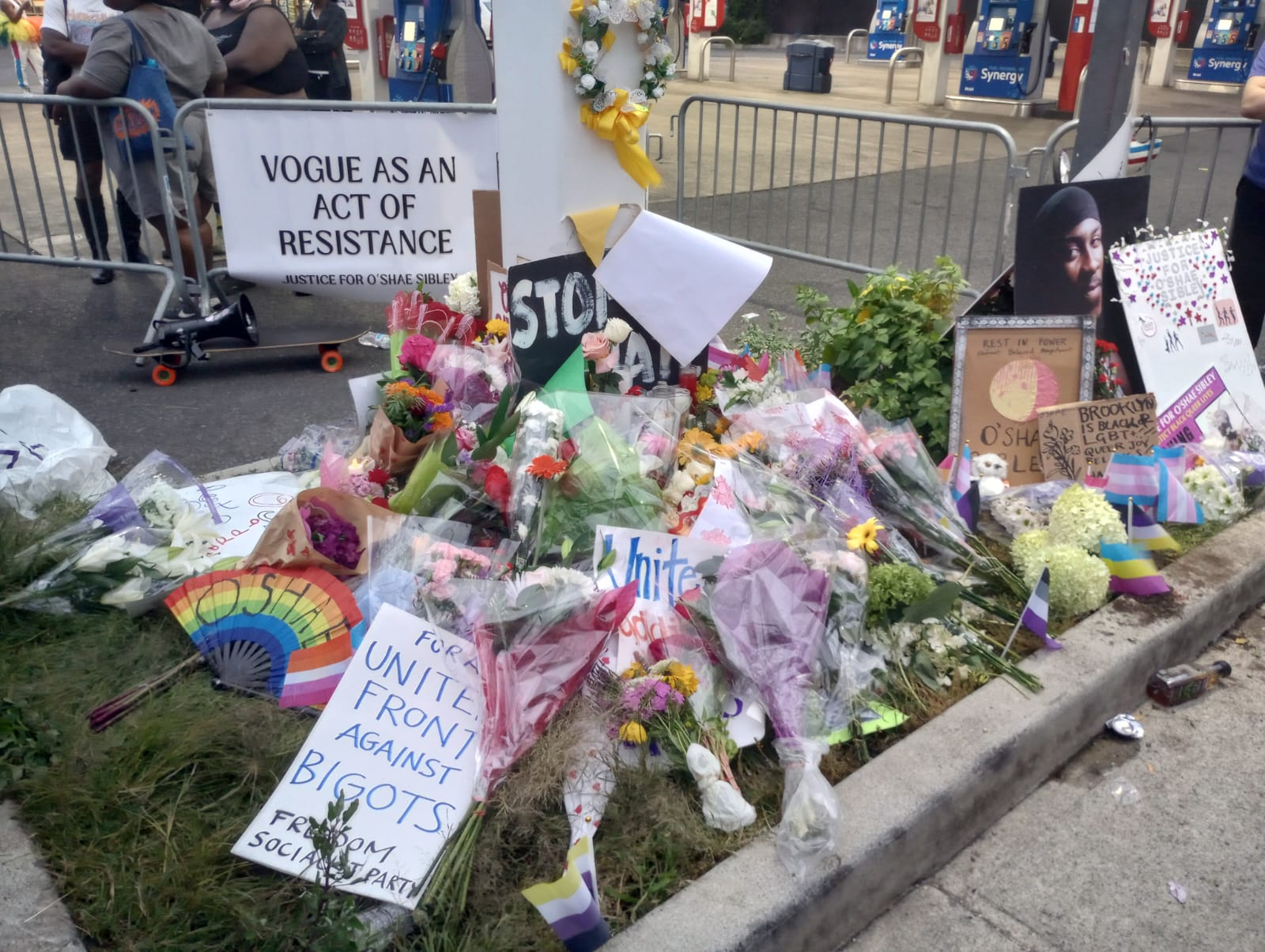
Memorial for O'Shae Sibley

The stabbing was called a hate crime by New York City Mayor Eric Adams, who also vowed to find the perpetrator. The killing has been condemned by LGBTQ lawmakers and activists, including New York State Senator Brad Hoylman-Sigal, who expressed being "heartbroken and enraged to learn about O'Shae Sibley's death" in a tweet. Beyoncé, the artist whose music Sibley and his friends were playing at the time of the incident, paid tribute to Sibley on her website, which features the phrase "rest in power O'Shae Sibley". Those who paid tribute to Sibley also include Spike Lee, Club Cumming, a gay bar, and ballroom communities in Los Angeles and New York, who staged protests and vigils to remember Sibley. On August 3, Sibley was honored by 80 mourners at the Stonewall Inn, a bar regarded as being of key importance to the gay rights movement. On August 4, hundreds of people gathered at a vigil held at the scene of Sibley's death to mourn, celebrate his life, and protest. Titled "Vogue as an Act of Resistance," it featured individuals who vogued in Sibley's memory.

== See also ==
- History of violence against LGBTQ people in the United States
- List of acts of violence against LGBTQ people
