= Muhlaysia Booker =

American murdered trans woman

- Born: January 14, 1997; Dallas, Texas
- Died: May 18, 2019 (aged 22); Dallas, Texas
- Cause of death: Gunshot wound

Muhlaysia Booker (January 14, 1997 – May 18, 2019) was an African-American transgender woman whose filmed assault in Dallas, Texas went viral on social media. She was murdered a month later.

== Attack ==
On April 12, 2019, Booker and a cousin went to see a fight in Royal Crest Apartments. Upon leaving, Booker backed into a car and tried to flee the scene. The driver got out of his car and held Booker against her will until damages were paid. A crowd gathered around the altercation and a man named Edward Thomas was offered $200 to assault Booker. Bystanders watched, videotaped, and yelled. The video was uploaded to social media and went viral. Booker had a concussion and fractured wrist. The Dallas mayor Mike Rawlings labeled it as "mob violence."

On April 14, 2019, Edward Thomas was charged with aggravated assault and held without bond in Dallas County jail. The police stated that his ankle monitor placed him at the location. He was eventually bonded at $75,000 at his court hearing and went back to jail on May 20. In October 2019, Thomas was convicted of a lesser charge of misdemeanor assault and sentenced to serve 300 days in jail.

After Booker's attack, supporters held a small rally. Booker spoke out about assault against the transgender community. Her cousin, Quanjasmine Baccus, said, "She was picked on because she is transgender."

== Murder ==
At around 6:40 AM on May 18, 2019, police officers responded to reports of a shooting near Tenison Park Golf Course, where Booker was found dead from a gunshot wound. Kendrell Lyles, a 34-year old man, was arrested and charged with Booker's murder, as well as two other killings. Police said that earlier, Booker was seen getting into a light-colored Lincoln, matching the description of Lyles' car. Police discovered phone records between Booker and Lyles, placing him in the area.

In November 2023, Lyles pleaded guilty to murder and was sentenced to 48 years in prison. He is also charged in the murders of Leticia Grant and Kenneth Cichocki.

== See also ==
- History of violence against LGBT people in the United States
- List of acts of violence against LGBT people
