= Murder of Gordon Church =

1988 murder of a gay man in Utah, United States

Gordon Church
- Church in his 1978 Cedar High School yearbook photo
- Born: Gordon Ray Church; September 14, 1960; Fillmore, Utah, U.S.
- Died: November 22, 1988 (aged 28); Millard County, Utah, U.S.
- Cause of death: Murder (blunt force trauma)
- Body discovered: November 23, 1988
- Resting place: Delta Cemetery, Millard County, Utah, U.S.
- Education: Southern Utah University
- Occupation: Student
- Known for: Gay murder victim

Gordon Ray Church (September 14, 1960 – November 22, 1988) was an American man who was murdered in Millard County, Utah. Church, who was gay, was kidnapped, raped, tortured, and killed by Michael Anthony Archuleta and Lance Conway Wood, primarily because of his sexual orientation. Archuleta was sentenced to death, while Wood received a life sentence. In 2020, the case received renewed attention following the release of Dog Valley, a documentary film about Church's life and the circumstances of his murder. The filmmakers stated that the documentary was intended to promote greater understanding and support for the LGBTQ community.

== Murder ==
On the evening of November 21, 1988, Church planned to meet several friends for a meal before the Thanksgiving holiday. The group intended to gather at an apartment and then go to a restaurant. Before arriving, Church stopped at a 7-Eleven in Cedar City, Utah, to buy cigarettes. At the store, he encountered Michael Anthony Archuleta and Lance Conway Wood, who were purchasing soda and whiskey. According to the men, they spoke with Church in the parking lot.

The three then left together in Church's car, briefly speaking with two women before driving to a secluded area in Cedar Canyon. There, Wood and Archulett both say Church told the men he was gay.

Accounts of what happened next differ. Wood stated he and Archuleta planned to rob Church because he was gay, but Archuleta denied this. According to Archuleta, after Church disclosed his sexual orientation Church also offered to engage in anal sex. Wood claimed Archuletta sexually assaulted Church while holding a knife to his throat and subsequently asked if Wood wanted to also assault Church. Wood says he declined.

After the assault, Church was tackled to the ground, suffering a broken arm and a fracture to the lower left portion of his jaw. Wood then cut Church across the throat, leaving a superficial wound in the shape of an "X." Church was forced into the trunk of his car and bound with tire chains and a bungee cord.

Church was driven about 80 miles to a remote area of Millard County known as Dog Valley. He was removed from the trunk, and battery cable clamps were attached to his testicles and connected to a car battery. He was shocked with electricity and sodomized with a tire iron, which pierced his liver. He was then struck repeatedly in the head with a tire jack. Church died in the early hours of November 22 from severe head injuries. His body was placed in a shallow grave and discovered the following day. A medical examiner stated the injuries were comparable to those caused by a truck running over his head.

== Aftermath ==
Following the murder, Wood and Archuleta fled the area in Church's car, with Wood driving. They traveled north on I-15 and abandoned the vehicle in Salt Lake City. Their clothing remained covered in Church's blood, so they went to a nearby store to purchase new clothes. Archuleta told the store clerk that the stains were from a rabbit hunting trip the previous night. The men subsequently discarded their old clothes in a drainage ditch and hitchhiked back to Cedar City.

The following day, Wood, who was reportedly panicking over his involvement in the crime, confessed to his parole officer that he had witnessed Archuleta commit a murder. On November 24, he led authorities to the scene of the crime and provided a statement to Millard County officials, after which he was arrested. Archuleta was arrested shortly thereafter in Cedar City.

== Trials and appeals ==
Archuleta was convicted of first-degree murder in the killing of Church. On December 20, 1989, he was sentenced to death. Ultimately, it is believed that Archuleta was the primary instigator of the crime. He remains on Utah's death row at Utah State Prison. In 2023, he was one of four death row inmates who filed a lawsuit against the state of Utah, challenging its capital punishment statutes.

On March 14, 1990, Wood was sentenced to life in prison for his role in Church's murder. As the jury could not unanimously agree on a death sentence he was spared the death penalty. Wood was transferred to a correctional facility in Idaho after his conviction. In 2013, he was moved to a correctional facility in Oregon, where he currently resides.

In 1995, during a rehearing, the decision for Wood to serve the remainder of his life in prison was upheld. He continued to make requests for a redetermination hearing over the years. In 2021, the Utah Board of Pardons and Parole agreed to take his request, and he was granted a parole hearing. This was due to Wood's supposed positive institutional behavior and his programming and rehabilitation efforts. The board also took into consideration his age at the time of the crime and current sentencing guidelines.

In 2024, Wood's hearing was held. He claimed to be a different person from who he once was and had not wanted Church to die. Church's brother, Kevin Church, spoke at the hearing and called Wood a "con man and a liar", claiming he had never accepted responsibility for his involvement in the crime. Kevin was also angered by how Wood referred to himself as the "accomplice", claiming he believed Wood was more evil than Archuleta, because Archuleta at least admitted what he did. In January 2025, the Utah Board of Pardons and Parole announced that Wood would not be granted parole. However, they scheduled another hearing for 2038, meaning Wood must remain in prison until at least then.

== In popular culture ==
In 2020, a documentary film titled Dog Valley was made by filmmakers Chad Anderson and Dave Lindsay and was distributed by Lucky 27 Media. The film tells Church's story and features interviews with people involved in his case, including Wood, who was interviewed from prison. Archuleta declined to be interviewed for the film. The documentary was shown at several festivals, including the Red Rock Film Festival.

The film aimed to encourage greater acceptance of the LGBTQ community and to promote discussions about hate crimes.

== See also ==
- Capital punishment in Utah
- History of violence against LGBTQ people in the United States
- List of acts of violence against LGBTQ people
- List of death row inmates in the United States § Utah
- List of kidnappings
- Murder of Anthony Milano, another anti-gay hate crime which resulted in a death sentence
- Violence against LGBTQ people
