= Death of Sean Kennedy =

2007 manslaughter in South Carolina, United States

- Location: Greenville, South Carolina
- Date: May 16, 2007
- Attack type: Gay bashing
- Victim: Sean Kennedy

Sean W. Kennedy (April 8, 1987 – May 16, 2007) was a gay American man who was severely punched by a younger man, Stephen Andrew Moller as Kennedy was leaving a bar in Greenville, South Carolina. The punch was so hard that it shattered his facial bones and separated his brain from his brain stem. Kennedy died 17 hours later of his fatal injuries. This attack and Kennedy's death drew attention to South Carolina's lack of a hate crime law and is believed to have contributed to passage of the federal Hate Crime Prevention Act of 2009, for which his mother lobbied. Additionally, Moller served so little time "because of the lack of an applicable Violent Crime Law in South Carolina" at the time, according to the Judge, although this explanation was seen by the LGBTQ community merely as thinly veiled homophobia.

Stephen Andrew Moller pleaded guilty to involuntary manslaughter in causing Kennedy's death. He was sentenced to five years, suspended to three years and counting time already served. He was released on parole on July 1, 2009.

== Death ==
On May 16, 2007, at about 3:45 am, Kennedy was leaving a local bar in Greenville, South Carolina. A car pulled up beside him, and Moller got out and approached Kennedy. He punched him hard enough to break facial bones. Kennedy fell and hit the asphalt, resulting in his brain separating from his brain stem and ricocheting in his skull. Kennedy later died of his injuries.

18-year-old Stephen Andrew Moller was charged with involuntary manslaughter of Sean Kennedy. The warrant stated that the act was "a result of the defendant (Moller) not liking the sexual identity of the victim."

== Pre-trial ==
In November 2007, Moller was released to home detention upon paying a $25,000 bond. He was required to stay with his mother until his trial.

The charge of murder was reduced to involuntary manslaughter because there was no conscious premeditated desire to kill Kennedy, as well as the fact that the state law does not have a charge that fits between murder and involuntary manslaughter. Unable to secure a conviction for murder, the prosecuting attorneys opted for involuntary manslaughter in order to get the violent activity onto Moller's record. The sentence carries a 0–5 years prison term, and Moller was released on July 1, 2009.

== Sentencing ==
On June 11, 2008, Moller appeared at a plea hearing (a no-jury trial). He pleaded guilty to the charge and was sentenced to five years, suspended to three years, including the 199 days he served in county jail before he was released on bond.

At the sentencing, Moller denied that his attack was a hate crime, claiming that he did not know Kennedy's sexual orientation prior to the attack. This explanation was contradicted by eyewitnesses.

Moller received a 2-month credit for working on getting his GED and was released 7 days early on July 1, 2009, after having served 12 months in prison. All releases generally occur on the first of the month, according to the department of parole in South Carolina. Moller was on probation for 3 years and ordered to take anger management classes, complete 30-days of community service, and to have regular alcohol/drug testing and counseling.

== Legacy ==
At the time of Kennedy's death, South Carolina did not have a state hate crimes statute, and the federal hate crime legislation did not specifically cover LGBT people. Kennedy's death brought South Carolina's absence of any hate crime protection to national attention. As a result of his death, and the killing of a transgender teen shortly afterwards, Charleston State House representative Seth Whipper lobbied unsuccessfully to introduce state legislation.

Elke Kennedy, Sean's mother, established the organization Sean's Last Wish Foundation two weeks after her son's death. She spent two years campaigning for the passage of expanded federal hate crimes legislation. When the Hate Crime Prevention Act was signed into law by President Barack Obama on October 28, 2009, CNN interviewed Elke Kennedy, who attended the ceremony at the White House.

== See also ==
- Hate crime laws in the United States
