= Killing of Ronnie Paris =

American murder victim (2001–2005)

Ronnie Paris
- Born: Ronnie Antonio Paris; December 9, 2001; United States
- Died: January 28, 2005 (aged 3)
- Cause of death: Brain injuries
- Known for: Child manslaughter and abuse victim

Ronnie Antonio Paris (December 9, 2001 – January 28, 2005) was an American three-year-old boy from Tampa, Florida, who was murdered in 2005. Paris was subject to severe physical abuse at the hands of his father, Ronnie Paris Sr., who was convinced he was homosexual despite his young age, and was forced to box repeatedly, eventually entering a coma and dying from brain injuries. His death brought attention to the Florida Department of Children & Families for failing to identify the child abuse and neglect. Controversy arose over Paris being removed from his home and placed into foster care, only to be returned, and died within six weeks from continued abuse. Ronnie Paris Sr. was convicted of manslaughter and sentenced to 30 years in prison.

== Background ==
In May 2002, the Florida Department of Children and Family Services removed Paris from his home and placed him in protective custody, after he was admitted to the hospital for repeated vomiting, and doctors determined he was undernourished and had a broken arm.

On December 13, 2004, four days after his third birthday, Paris was returned to his parents. This replacement was the subject of investigation by the local press because they felt it represented a breakdown of the child welfare system. On January 22, Paris slipped into a coma after falling asleep on a couch at a family friend's house, where his parents were attending a Bible study. Upon realizing he was unconscious, his parents rushed into the hospital. Paris died six days later, when he was removed from life support.

Detective Anthony Zambito was suspicious and testified that "it wasn't until investigators questioned them separately" that the boy's mother spoke of abuse. During an investigation of the child's death, his mother—Nysheera Paris—told detectives that her husband—Ronnie Paris, Sr. -- had repeatedly abused the child, slapping him in the back of the head, slamming him into walls, and forcing the child to participate in father-son boxing matches until the boy began to shake, cry, and wet himself.

== Trial ==
The child's father was charged with murder and aggravated child abuse. His mother was charged with child neglect and failing to get medical attention for her son. In July 2005, Ronnie Paris Sr. went on trial for his son's murder facing a maximum of 15 years for the death. During the trial witnesses testified the boy had been slapped around and thrown into walls by his dad to toughen him up. Nysheera Paris testified that her husband thought their son might be gay, and that he would smack the boy in the back of the head and slam him into walls because he didn't want his son to grow up "soft." Her testimony was corroborated by her sister, Shanita Powell, who said "He was trying to teach him how to fight," and told the court "He was afraid the child might be gay." Family friend Sheldon Bostick, who attended Bible study with the Paris family, testified that Ronnie Paris, Sr., "slap-boxed" with his son because "He didn't want him to be a sissy". Paris Sr. had reported this was how he had been taught, by his father, to take a punch.

Forensic pathologist Dr. Sam Gulino noted the child's scarred face and bruised head, and told the court that the lethargy and vomiting spells, the coma and eventual death were due to head trauma that was not accidental but deliberately inflicted.

The child's foster mother testified that during the two years he lived with her, Paris never vomited, and had a healthy appetite.

== Aftermath ==
In July 2005, after three hours of deliberation, a jury convicted Ronnie Paris, Sr. of second degree manslaughter and aggravated child abuse in the death of his son. On August 19, 2005, he was sentenced to 30 years imprisonment, and ten years probation. The mother Nysheera Paris was sentenced to 5 years probation for culpable negligence in the death of her son.

The crime is also seen as a hate crime by LGBT supporters, including Tennessee artist James McKissic who premiered a large scale painting of Paris Jr. along with two other "youth of color who were victims of hate crimes" at the Chattanooga African American Museum in 2008. The Gay American Heroes Foundation, memorializing LGBT murder victims of "hate crimes motivated by sexual orientation bias," will include Paris Jr. in their traveling memorial that visits cities where someone has been murdered for being LGBT or thought to be.
