= Killing of Guin Richie Phillips =

2003 killing in Elizabethtown, Kentucky, US

Guin "Richie" Phillips (1967 – June 17, 2003) was a gay man in Elizabethtown, Kentucky. Phillips disappeared on June 17, 2003. His body was found on June 25, 2003, in a suitcase in Rough River Lake.

== Background ==
On June 17, 2003, Phillips was seen having lunch at a restaurant in Elizabethtown, Kentucky, with a friend later identified by investigators as 21-year-old Joshua Cottrell. Several days later, his truck and other belongings were found abandoned in southern Indiana. A witness later told police she saw Phillips and Cottrell together in Phillips's truck the same day. That was the last time Phillips was seen alive.

Phillips's mother – Marge Phillips – reported her son missing and told police she feared he had been harmed because he was gay.

== Discovery and arrest ==
On Wednesday, June 25, 2003, two fishermen pulled a suitcase out of Rough River Lake, unzipped it and found Phillips's body inside. Phillips was identified by personal items found with the body and a Wildcat tattoo on the shoulder.

On Friday, June 27, 2003, Cottrell, an acquaintance of Phillips's, was arrested and charged with Phillips's murder. Prosecutors announced that they would seek the death penalty in the case.

== Trial and testimony ==
Cottrell was arraigned on June 28, 2003, at the Breckinridge County Courthouse, where he pleaded not guilty to charges of murdering Phillips. He was then held on $500,000 bond.

In October 2003 Cottrell's trial was moved to Hardin County based on forensic evidence that showed Phillips was most likely killed in Cottrell's Elizabethtown hotel room. The change in jurisdiction delayed the start of the trial.

A canceled check introduced into evidence showed that Cottrell purchased the suitcase six days before the murder. Drops of Phillips' blood were found on the bathroom tiles in the hotel. Cottrell's DNA was also found on a cigarette in Phillips' truck. Previously, investigators were unsure whether Phillips had been killed at Rough River Lake, where his body was found, or elsewhere.

In May 2004, the trial was further delayed when Judge Henry Bland ordered a continuance after Cottrell's defense attorney filed new discovery documents. The trial got under way in January 2005, at the Hardin County courthouse.

=== Friend and family testify ===
Rob Dewitt, a friend who introduced Phillips to Cottrell three years earlier said that Cottrell bought a set of luggage at the Elizabethtown J. C. Penney. Cottrell told Dewitt that he was planning to travel. Dewitt testified in court that he told Cottrell that Phillips was attracted to him, and that Cottrell said he would "cold-cock" Phillips if he ever made a pass at him. Dewitt also testified that he had never seen Phillips act in an aggressive manner.

Cottrell's aunt – Wendy McAnly – testified that Cottrell confessed to the crime more than a week earlier, but his family didn't believe him. Cottrell's aunt and cousin testified that he had planned to kill Phillips because he was gay, and had lured Phillips into his hotel room where he hit and strangled him.

McAnly said that Cottrell invited Phillips to his Elizabethtown motel room. When Phillips arrived, Cottrell asked if Phillips liked him without his shirt, and when Phillips said yes and touched him, Cottrell put him in a headlock and choked him.

Cottrell's cousin – Tara Gaddie – testified that Cottrell arrived at her home in Phillips' truck after disposing of his body in Rough River Lake, and answered "He's gone. He's dead," when she asked him what he'd done. Gaddie also said she never heard Cottrell talk about strangling Phillips or use derogatory terms to describe him.

=== Cottrell's testimony ===
In court, Cottrell testified that after he drove Phillips around Elizabethtown looking for a job, Phillips came into his motel room uninvited, tried to kiss him, and attempted to force him into oral sex. Cottrell then put Phillips in a headlock, pulled him to the floor and "started hitting him as hard as I could, as many times as I could."

When he realized Phillips was dead, Cottrell says he panicked and put his body into the suitcase, which he said in court he'd brought to haul his belongings as he drifted between motel rooms and friends' houses.

== "Gay panic defense" ==
Cottrell's defense attorney employed what is called a gay panic defense, arguing that Phillips's own actions "led to a chain of events that caused his death, " and that Cottrell was within his rights under Kentucky law to fight back to protect himself from being raped, including use of deadly force if necessary. "But what set it all in motion, he was privileged to do," Drabenstadt said. "What set it in motion were the actions of a 36-year-old man."

Drabestadt may have been referring to a Kentucky "stand-your-ground" law permitting people to use deadly force to protect themselves against death, serious physical injury, kidnapping, and forced sexual intercourse. In February 2001, Kentucky Representative Bob Damron sponsored a bill that would have added "deviant sexual intercourse" to the existing law. The Kentucky House Judiciary Committee amended the measure to replace "deviant sexual intercourse" with "forced sodomy," and clarify its definitions of "force," "threat," and "attempt."

Prosecuting attorney Chris Shaw argued in closing that Cottrell lured Phillips to his room in order to kill him, and then attempted to cover it up in a cold, calculated manner. Shaw added that Phillips's sexual orientation was immaterial in the case, except for Cottrell's "steaming anger" toward gay men. Shaw said that if Phillips made sexual advances Cottrell should have walked away.

== Verdict and sentencing ==
After deliberating for nine hours, the jury returned with its verdict. The jury had the option of finding Cottrell guilty of murder, reckless homicide, or manslaughter. The jury rejected the murder charge and instead found Cottrell guilty of second degree manslaughter, theft by taking of more than 300 dollars, and tampering with physical evidence.

Cottrell was sentenced on March 1, 2005. The jury recommended Cottrell be sentenced to 30 years; 20 for manslaughter, and another ten for theft and tampering with evidence. However, state law limited the judge to sentencing Cottrell to a maximum of 20 years.

In Kentucky, committing a crime against someone because of the victim's sexual orientation is considered a hate crime. At sentencing, a judge may deny probation or parole if it is determined that the victim's race, color, national origin, sexual orientation, or religion was a "primary factor" in committing the offense. The prosecution in Cottrell's case did not pursue hate crime charges against him.

Neither the defense nor the victim's family had immediate comment on the verdict or sentencing. One month later Greg Phillips, the victim's brother, told The Advocate, "I think they were looking at my brother being a homosexual when they made their decision to pick the lesser charge."

Cottrell was eligible for parole in July 2007—2½ years after his conviction.

== See also ==
- Violence against LGBT people
