= Luke Lee =

Singaporean actor and lawyer (born 1991)

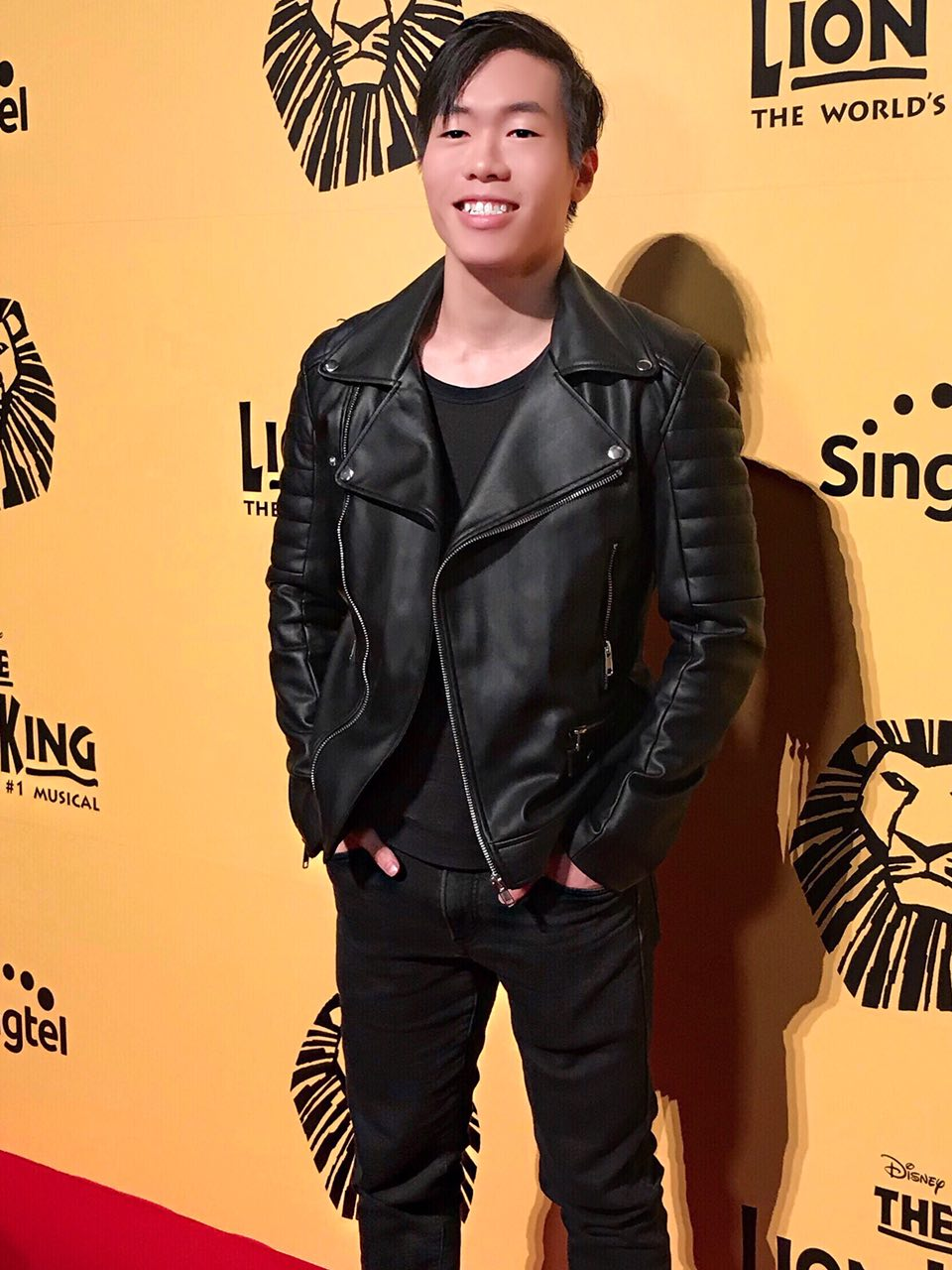
- Luke Lee at the 2018 Lion King premiere
- Born: Luke Lee Wen Loong; December 16, 1991 (age 34); Singapore
- Education: University of Manchester(LL.B.(Hons.)); Bristol Old Vic Theatre School
- Occupations: Actor, lawyer
- Years active: 2009–present
- Website: www.imdb.me/lukelee

Luke Lee Wen Loong (born December 16, 1991) is a Singaporean actor and lawyer, best known for his co-starring role as Sergeant Heng in Jack Neo's army movies Ah Boys to Men and Ah Boys to Men 2. He has also appeared in the Hong Kong-Singapore horror film A Fantastic Ghost Wedding. Other notable appearances include MediaCorp Channel 5's Tanglin, HBO (Asia)'s Serangoon Road and BBC's Insatiable Teens.

== Career ==
Law

Lee studied law at the University of Manchester and obtained his Bachelor of Laws with Honours in 2015. Lee completed his Bar Examinations and was called to the Singapore Bar as a qualified lawyer.

Acting

Lee first appeared on television as a host of the 2009 Asian Youth Games, part of Singapore's bid to host the 2010 Summer Youth Olympics. His first screen acting role was in 2012 in an SPCA pet adoption commercial. Lee's first film credit was 2012's Ah Boys to Men, playing the supporting role of Sergeant Heng. The film was a commercial success, despite mixed critical reviews. In 2013, Lee reprised his role as Sergeant Heng in its sequel known as Ah Boys to Men 2. As of January 2013, Ah Boys to Men has grossed $6.18 million domestically, and Ah Boys to Men 2 has grossed $7.9 million, remaining the biggest local box office and the highest grossing Singaporean film to date.

Lee appeared in several MediaCorp programmes such as Tanglin, Point of Entry, Unnatural, On the Edge, Step Puteri. Lee also appeared in the music video for the theme song of Ah Boys to Men, titled "Recruit's Anthem".

In 2014, Lee landed a role in A Fantastic Ghost Wedding, a Hong Kong-Singapore horror film directed by Meng Ong. The film was selected for development by the Sundance Institute Screenwriting Lab, and the Taiwan Golden Horse Film Project Promotion.

In 2015, Lee starred as the lead in Kan Lume's Fragment, an anthology film celebrating the strength and diversity of South-East Asian independent cinema and commissioned by the Asian Film Archive. That same year, he also starred in four episodes of Tanglin, as Alfred Soh.

In a 2016 interview with The New Paper for his upcoming movie Burn, Lee stated "I'm a huge fan of action films. I also feel that Singapore hasn't had a defining action film that truly sets the standards on an international stage. Our neighbouring countries like Indonesia and Thailand are able to do that and with a lower budget (compared to Hollywood). We are perfectly placed on the map so I thought, 'Why don't we pull in resources from all over the globe to make (a movie like that)?'". Lee is in talks to produce and star in Burn, directed by James Lee.

In 2018, Lee played James Lee in the Singapore romantic comedy series 20 Days, starring Felicia Chin and Elvin Ng.

== Personal life ==
Lee attended National Junior College. During his university studies, Lee trained at the Bristol Old Vic Theatre School and LAMDA, and attended open casting calls, where he gained his first agent, David Daly Associates.

== Filmography ==
Film
Year	Title	Role	Notes
2011	Story of My Life	Boyfriend	Short film
2012	Ah Boys to Men	Third Sergeant Jed Heng	
2013	Ah Boys to Men 2	Third Sergeant Jed Heng	
2014	A Fantastic Ghost Wedding	Ah Niu	
2015	Fragment	Lead	

Television
Year	Title	Role	Notes
2012	Rock Republic (摇滚异族)	Police Officer	1 Episode
2013	Unnatural	Brandon	1 Episode
2013	Step Puteri	Water Polo Player	1 Episode
2013	Point of Entry	DEA Officer Hao	1 Episode
2013	On the Edge	Seng Long	1 Episode
2013	Here's to Health	Boyfriend	1 Episode
2013	Serangoon Road	Concierge	1 Episode
2013	Insatiable Teens	Social Commentator	1 Episode
2014	The Best I Could	State Prosecutor	1 Episode
2015	Tanglin	Alfred Soh	4 Episodes
2018	20 Days (TV series)	James Lee	9 Episodes
