= Gay bashing =

Violence against and bullying of LGBTQ people

Gay bashing is an attack, abuse, or assault committed against a person who is perceived by the aggressor to be gay, lesbian, bisexual, transgender or queer (LGBTQ+). It includes both violence against LGBTQ people and LGBTQ bullying. The term covers violence against and bullying of people who are LGBTQ, as well as non-LGBTQ people whom the attacker perceives to be LGBTQ.

Physical gay bashings sometimes involve extreme violence or murder, the perpetrators' actions being based on their perceptions or assumptions of the victim's sexual orientation, gender identity, or gender expression.

LGBTQ youth are more likely to report bullying than non-LGBTQ youth, particularly in schools. Victims of LGBTQ bullying may feel unsafe, resulting in depression and anxiety, including increased rates of suicide and attempted suicide. LGBTQ students may try to pass as heterosexual to escape the chance of being bullied, leading to further stress and isolation from available supports. Support organizations exist in many countries to prevent LGBTQ bullying and support victims. Some jurisdictions have passed legislation against LGBTQ bullying and harassment.

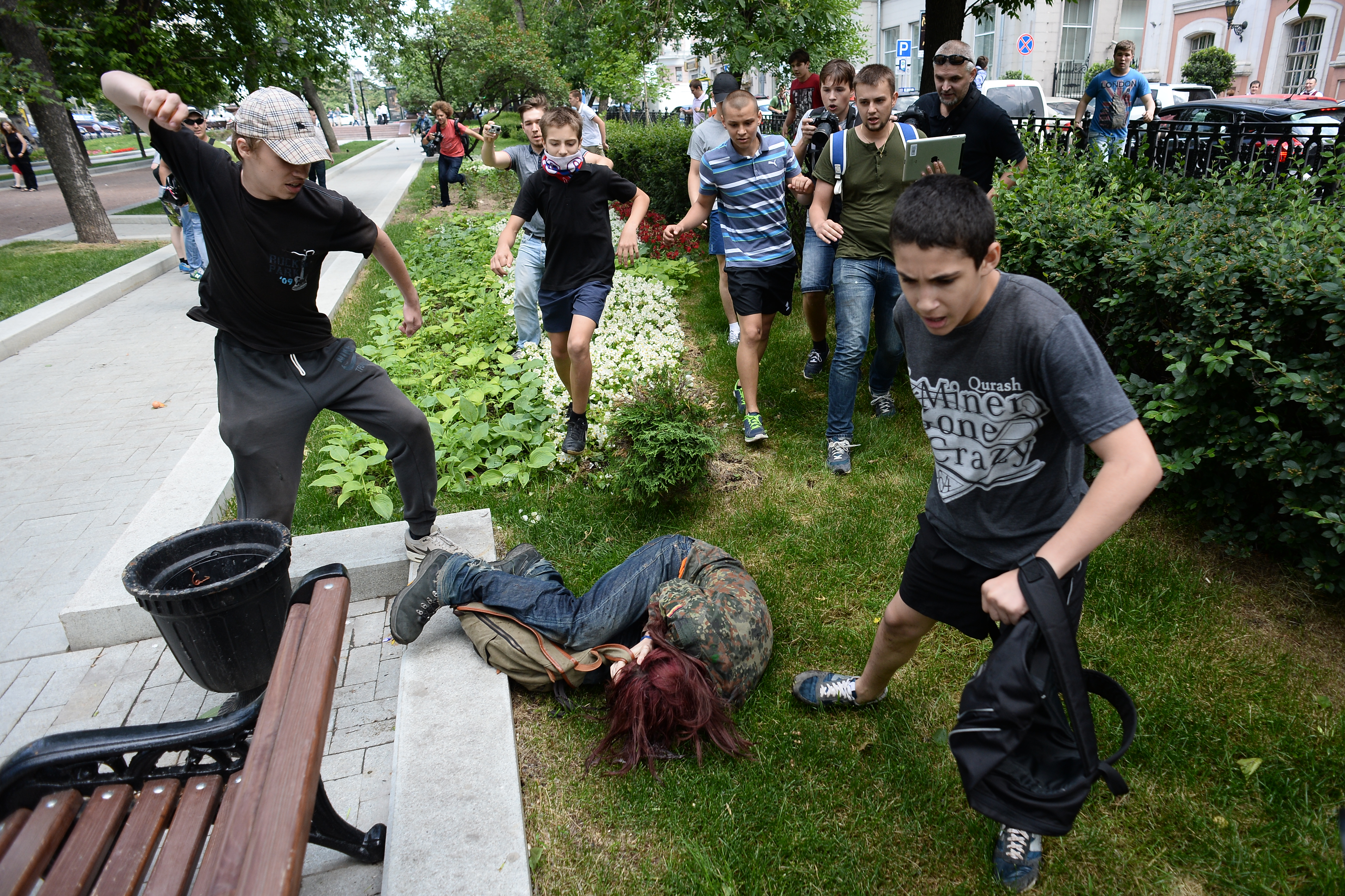
Attack on a LGBTQ activist in Moscow, Russia

== Violence ==
LGBTQ people frequently experience violence directed toward their sexuality, gender identity, or gender expression. This violence may be enacted by the state, as in laws prescribing punishment for homosexual acts, or by individuals. It may be motivated by biphobia, gayphobia, homophobia, lesbophobia, and transphobia. Influencing factors may be cultural, religious, or political mores and biases.

== Bullying ==
Bullying of LGBTQ people, particularly LGBTQ youth, involves intentional actions toward the victim, repeated negative actions by one or more people against another person, and an imbalance of physical or psychological power.

LGBTQ youth are more likely to report bullying than non-LGBTQ youth. In one study, boys who were bullied with taunts of being gay suffered more bullying and more negative effects compared with boys who were bullied with other categories of taunting. Some researchers suggest including youth questioning their sexuality in any research on LGBTQ bullying because they may be as susceptible to its effects as LGBTQ students.

== See also ==
- Abuse
- Anti-LGBT slogans
- Bash Back!
- Bullying
- Corrective rape
- Cyberbullying
- Day of Silence
- Hate crime
- School bullying
- Significant acts of violence against LGBT people
- Trans bashing
- Trust and safety issues in online dating services
