= Murder of Anthony Milano =

1987 anti-gay murder in Pennsylvania

- Location: Bristol Township, Pennsylvania, U.S.
- Date: December 15, 1987; 38 years ago
- Attack type: Homicide by stabbing, anti-gay hate crime
- Deaths: 1
- Victim: Anthony Milano
- Perpetrators: Richard Laird; Frank Chester
- Sentence: Laird: Death; Chester: Death (later resentenced to life imprisonment without parole)

The murder of Anthony Milano occurred on December 15, 1987, when Richard Laird and Frank Chester killed Milano, a 26-year-old gay man, in Bristol Township, Pennsylvania. According to prosecutors, Laird and Chester decided to murder Milano shortly after meeting him on the night of December 14 because they believed he was gay. Both men were convicted and sentenced to death in May 1988. This reportedly marked the first time in the United States that perpetrators of an anti-gay hate crime received the death penalty. Laird remains on death row, while Chester has since been resentenced to life without parole.

== Murder ==
On the evening of December 14, 1987, Anthony "Tony" Milano, a 26-year-old gay commercial artist from Levittown, entered the Edgely Inn, a bar on Route 13 in Bristol Township, to get a sandwich. Earlier that evening, he had attended Bible study in Fallsington, where he discussed the Beatitudes. At the bar, Milano encountered 24-year-old Richard Laird and 20-year-old Frank Chester. He joined them, and they began chatting. A short time later, Laird started calling Milano names and pressured him into buying shots of vodka and whiskey. Laird was also overheard telling Chester how much he hated homosexuals. In the early hours of December 15, Milano reportedly agreed to drive the men home. According to Milano's father, his son may have thought he could show goodwill by offering them a ride.

Once in the car, a 1977 Chevrolet Nova, the men forced Milano to drive them around for 45 minutes, during which Laird repeatedly struck him. Eventually, Milano stopped the car in a wooded lot on the 1300 block of Ashby Avenue. According to trial testimony, Chester attacked Milano first, knocking him to the ground. Laird then pounced on him and repeatedly slashed his throat with a utility knife so deeply that he was nearly decapitated. Milano's spinal cord was severed, and a large gash extended from his chin to his chest. His throat had been cut so many times that the coroner was unable to count the wounds. Laird later claimed that Chester fought with Milano and delivered the fatal injuries. Milano died at the scene.

== Aftermath ==
Richard Laird

Frank Chester

That afternoon, Milano's mother reported him missing after he failed to return home. At around 11:00 p.m., police responded to reports of a car fire and discovered Milano's body, which had been badly beaten and stabbed. His car, set ablaze by Chester and Laird, was found about 85 feet away.

In the days that followed, Chester and Laird panicked about the crime, discussing how they might hide Milano's body. They also confided in an acquaintance, Richard Griscavage, a friend of Chester's who later became a key prosecution witness. According to Griscavage's testimony, Chester told him that he and Laird had gotten into a fight with someone at a bar and ended up killing him. Laird allegedly instructed Chester to keep quiet about the incident and frequently argued with him about it. During one discussion about where to bury Milano's body, Griscavage suggested a mountain in the Poconos.

On December 22, 1987, police arrested Laird in connection with Milano's murder. Chester had been interviewed by police on December 20 but then went on the run. He evaded authorities for several days before being captured on December 30, after police received a telephone tip. Both Laird and Chester were charged with first-degree murder, kidnapping, aggravated assault, unlawful restraint, false imprisonment, possession of an instrument of crime, and conspiracy.

== Trial and sentencing ==
Both men were tried together for Milano's murder, with each blaming the other for the killing. The prosecution argued that it did not matter which of the two had delivered the fatal slash, as both had conspired to kill him. A doctor testified that Milano remained alive for at least five minutes during the throat-slashing: "There was pain, suffering, agony. The slashings were so deep that they cut the cervical bone, the spine. He lived for five, seven, 10 minutes." The doctor also used a life-size drawing of Milano to illustrate the injuries documented in the autopsy.

On May 21, 1988, a Bucks County jury sentenced Chester and Laird to death. Upon hearing the verdict, both men lowered their heads and appeared tearful. The jurors had deliberated for nearly 12 hours over the preceding two days before announcing their guilty verdict on May 20. Members of the Philadelphia Lesbian and Gay Task Force attended the trial wearing black armbands with pink triangles, symbols that had been used by the Nazis to identify homosexuals.

Following the sentence, the district attorney for Bucks County told reporters that the court's decision to impose the death penalty against both men for an anti-gay crime marked the first one of its kind in the United States. According to gay rights activists, the sentences warned others against committing anti-gay violence. Rita Addessa, the executive director of the Philadelphia Lesbian and Gay Task Force, expressed her support for the prosecution in handling the case. She accused other prosecutors of letting their own homophobia interfere with the quality of their prosecution. Addessa was pleased with the outcome of the trial, as it sent a message from the judicial system that anti-gay violence would not be tolerated. However, when asked about the death sentences of the two perpetrators, she said she was "not interested in murdering people who murder my people. I'm interested in creating an environment in which my people are not murdered for being gay."

Although the jury returned a death verdict in May 1988, Chester and Laird were not formally sentenced until more than a year later. On July 19, 1989, the trial court sentenced both men to death. During the sentencing, Laird called the county prosecutors "dirt balls" and made several other threats. He also accused Chester of being a psychopath and a liar. Although the men had been tried together, growing animosity between them led to separate sentencing hearings. Milano's family attended the proceedings and thanked God for the sentences.

== Subsequent legal developments ==
In 1991, the Supreme Court of Pennsylvania upheld both Laird's and Chester's convictions and death sentences. Laird subsequently petitioned for post-conviction relief in Pennsylvania state court under the Pennsylvania Post Conviction Relief Act (PCRA). However, the PCRA Court denied Laird's petition for relief, and the Pennsylvania Supreme Court affirmed in 1999. Having exhausted his options for attempting to obtain post-conviction relief in state court, Laird subsequently filed a petition for habeas corpus in federal district court, which was partially granted in 2001. The district court vacated Laird's first-degree murder conviction and death sentence without prejudice on the grounds that his due process rights had been violated. The United States Court of Appeals for the Third Circuit affirmed in 2005, directing that the case be returned to Pennsylvania state court for Laird to be either retried for first-degree murder or sentenced based on his remaining convictions, such as his conviction for second-degree murder. The state of Pennsylvania opted to retry Laird, and he was convicted and sentenced to death again in 2007.

In March 2011, Pennsylvania Governor Tom Corbett signed Laird's death warrant, scheduling his execution for May 12, 2011. However, in April, a Bucks County court judge subsequently granted a stay of his execution, as did a federal district judge the following day, to allow Laird's attorneys to pursue their post-conviction appeals. These appeals were also unsuccessful, with the PCRA Court denying Laird relief in orders issued in 2012 and 2013. The Supreme Court of Pennsylvania affirmed this decision in 2015. Laird then filed another petition for habeas relief in federal court, arguing that he had received ineffective assistance of counsel because his trial counsel failed to hire an expert to address the sexual abuse Laird suffered as a child. The district court denied this petition in 2016, and the Third Circuit affirmed this denial in a 2025 decision. On December 5, 2025 Laird received a Notice of Execution for January 2, 2026 signed by Pennsylvania Department of Corrections Secretary Laurel Harry. The same day Governor Josh Shapiro issued an executive order granting a temporary reprieve of execution.

In 2016, Chester was removed from death row and resentenced to life without parole after a Bucks County judge accepted his plea deal. Chester pleaded guilty to murder in the first degree and, in return, was resentenced to life in prison without the possibility of parole. Laird remains on death row.

== See also ==
- Capital punishment in Pennsylvania
- History of violence against LGBTQ people in the United States
- List of acts of violence against LGBTQ people
- List of death row inmates in the United States § Pennsylvania
- List of kidnappings
- Murder of Gordon Church, another anti-gay hate crime which resulted in a death sentence
- Violence against LGBTQ people
