= Murder of Rebecca Wight =

1988 murder in Pennsylvania, United States

The murder of Rebecca Wight (October 17, 1959 – May 13, 1988) occurred on May 13, 1988, in Michaux State Forest, Pennsylvania, United States, when Stephen Roy Carr fired on Wight and her partner, Claudia Brenner.

Wight was a business administration student, while her partner Brenner was an architecture student. They had met while attending Virginia Tech. In May 1988, the couple were hiking the Appalachian Trail in Pennsylvania. Carr met Wight in a public restroom. He later located her campground, and he spied on the couple while they had sex. He fired eight bullets at the women. Brenner was hit five times, but survived. Wight was shot twice, but the last shot shattered her liver.

For ten days after the shooting, Carr hid in a Mennonite community. The police arrested Carr on a warrant from Florida for grand larceny. At trial, Carr claimed he had been enraged by the sight of the two women having sex, and that the two women had taunted him by having sex in front of him. His attorney claimed that the couple's lesbianism was provocation that caused his client "inexplicable rage."

== Background ==
Rebecca Wight was a student, of Iranian-Puerto Rican heritage, who was working on her master's degree in business administration and Claudia Brenner was a Jewish, Manhattan-born architecture student; they had been partners for two years, having met while both were students at Virginia Tech.

In May 1988, Wight and Brenner were hiking the Appalachian Trail in Pennsylvania. They parked their car at Dead Woman Hollow, and hiked into Michaux State Forest where they set up camp.

== Murder ==
Wight first encountered Stephen Roy Carr in a public restroom near their campground. Carr, 22, sometimes lived in a cave and carried a .22 caliber rifle. He asked Wight for a cigarette. She said she did not have one, and hurried back to the campsite, where she told Brenner that someone else was there. The couple dressed, and decided to find a more private campsite.

The couple encountered Carr again later that day, when they stopped to look at their map. Brenner and Wight eventually set up camp in a new location. They ate dinner, and began to have sex. Unseen by the couple, Carr watched them from 82 feet away. He fired eight bullets at the women: Brenner was hit five times in the arm, face, head and neck; Wight was shot twice in the head and back. The last shot shattered Wight's liver. The eighth bullet missed.

Wight was unable to stand, so Brenner hiked four miles to the road, where she was able to get a ride to the Shippensburg police station. When the police returned to the scene, they found that Wight had died from her wounds.

Carr thought both women were dead. He left 25 rounds of ammunition at the scene, along with the knit cap he had worn; police found them at the scene. For ten days after the shooting, Carr hid in a Mennonite community. Since members of the community did not read the news or watch television, they did not know Carr was a suspect in a shooting until one member, who had secretly watched television, recognized Carr from the composite drawing on the news and called police.

Police arrested Carr on a warrant from Florida for grand larceny. Carr waived his right to a jury trial in exchange for an agreement by the prosecution not to seek the death penalty. At trial, Carr claimed he had been enraged by the sight of the two women having sex, that the two women had taunted him by having sex in front of him. His public defender said he had been raped in a Florida prison, and sexually abused as a child. The attorney claimed that the couple's lesbianism was provocation that caused his client "inexplicable rage."

The judge refused to allow evidence of Carr's psychosexual history, ruling it irrelevant. He also disallowed the introduction of Brenner's and Wight's relationship in court, thus forcing the defense to cut a deal for a bench trial in exchange for the prosecution not seeking a death sentence. On March 8, 1991, Carr's appeal, based on the court's decision to disallow introduction of his psychosexual history in court, was denied by the Superior Court of Pennsylvania.

== Aftermath ==
Brenner moved to Ithaca, New York and went on to write a book about the shooting, Wight's death, and her ordeal, Eight Bullets: One Woman's Story of Surviving Anti-Gay Violence, and to become an active speaker against anti-gay violence. In 1999, H. L. Pohlman also wrote a book about the murder, titled, The Whole Truth.

In 2015, a short documentary about the ordeal, called In the Hollow, was released. Brenner appeared in the documentary, and she also told her story on the British radio program, BBC Outlook.

In autumn 2015, Carr's lawyer, Michael George, ran unsuccessfully for a seat on the Supreme Court of Pennsylvania as a Republican. During the campaign, George's aggressive defense of Carr became an issue. Roy Keefer, the District Attorney who prosecuted the case, described George's conduct as "a ruse in order to slander the victims" but defended his actions in retrospect, noting that he had a duty to use every tactic he thought could benefit his client. Brenner said of George that he "added a lot of pain to a very traumatic and painful time in my life."

== See also ==
- Violence against LGBT people
- Gay panic defense

== Sources ==
- Pohlman, H. L. (1999). The Whole Truth?: A Case of Murder on the Appalachian Trail. Univ of Massachusetts Press. ISBN 9781558491663.
