= David Ray =

David Ray may refer to:

- David Ray (poet) (1932–2024), American poet
- David Parker Ray (1939–2002), American abductor and possible serial killer
- David Ray (American football) (born 1944), NFL placekicker
- David R. Ray (1945–1969), American navy sailor and Medal of Honor recipient
- David Ray (director) (born 1968), Canadian screenwriter and film director
- David Ray (politician), Republican member of Arkansas House of Representatives

== See also ==
- David Ray Hate Crimes Prevention Act, United States law
- USS David R. Ray, US Navy destroyer, sunk 2008
