= Matthew Shepard and James Byrd Jr. Hate Crimes Prevention Act =

American hate crime legislation

- Other short titles: Local Law Enforcement Hate Crimes Prevention Act of 2009
- Long title: To provide Federal assistance to States, local jurisdictions, and Indian tribes to prosecute hate crimes, and for other purposes.
- Enacted by: the 111th United States Congress
- Announced in: the 111th United States Congress
- Number of co-sponsors: 120

Codification
- Titles amended: 18 U.S.C.: Crimes and Criminal Procedure
- U.S.C. sections created: 18 U.S.C. ch. 13 § 249 et seq.

Legislative history
- Introduced in the House of Representatives as H.R. 1913 by John Conyers (D–MI) on April 2, 2009; Committee consideration by House Judiciary; Passed the House of Representatives on October 8, 2009 (281–146); Passed the Senate on July 23, 2009 (63–28); Signed into law by President Barack Obama on October 28, 2009

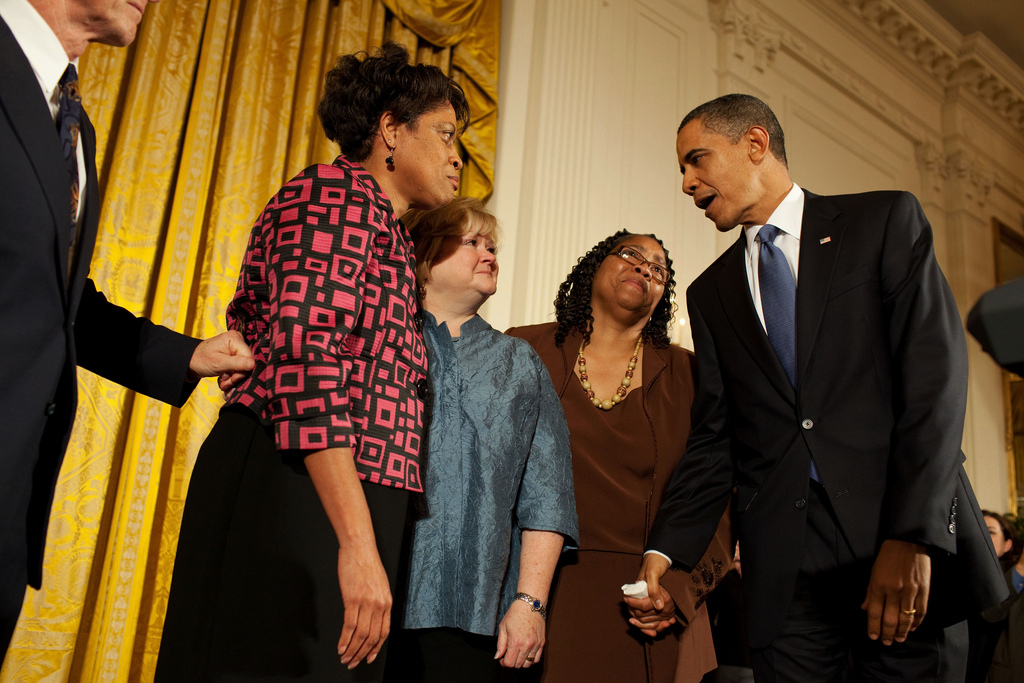
President Barack Obama greets Louvon Harris (left), Betty Byrd Boatner (right) both sisters of James Byrd Jr. and Judy Shepard at a reception commemorating the enactment of the legislation

The Matthew Shepard and James Byrd Jr. Hate Crimes Prevention Act is a landmark United States federal law, passed on October 22, 2009, and signed into law by President Barack Obama on October 28, 2009, as a rider to the National Defense Authorization Act for 2010 (H.R. 2647). Conceived as a response to the murders of Matthew Shepard and James Byrd Jr., both in 1998, the measure expands the 1968 United States federal hate-crime law to include crimes motivated by a victim's actual or perceived gender, sexual orientation, gender identity, or disability.

The bill also:

- Removes, in the case of hate crimes related to the race, color, religion, or national origin of the victim, the prerequisite that the victim be engaging in a federally protected activity, like voting or going to school;
- Gives federal authorities greater ability to engage in hate crimes investigations that local authorities choose not to pursue;
- Provides $5 million per year in funding for fiscal years 2010 through 2012 to help state and local agencies pay for investigating and prosecuting hate crimes;
- Requires the Federal Bureau of Investigation (FBI) to track statistics on hate crimes based on gender and gender identity (statistics for the other groups were already tracked).

== Origin ==
The Act is named after Matthew Shepard and James Byrd Jr. Shepard was a student who was tortured and murdered in 1998 near Laramie, Wyoming. Shepard was attacked due to him being gay, and the trial employed a gay panic defense. Byrd was an African American man who was tied to a truck by two white supremacists and a third man who had no racist background, dragged behind it, and decapitated in Jasper, Texas, in 1998. Shepard's murderers were given life sentences—in large part because his parents sought mercy for his killers. Two of Byrd's murderers were sentenced to death and executed in 2011 and 2019, respectively, while the third was sentenced to life in prison. All the convictions were obtained without the assistance of hate crimes laws, since none were applicable at the time.

The murders and subsequent trials brought national and international attention to the desire to amend U.S. hate crime legislation at both the state and federal levels. Wyoming hate crime laws at the time did not recognize homosexuals as a suspect class, whereas Texas had no hate crime laws at all.

Supporters of an expansion of hate crime laws argued that hate crimes are worse than regular crimes without a prejudiced motivation from a psychological perspective. The time it takes to mentally recover from a hate crime is almost twice as long as it is for a regular crime, and LGBTQ people often feel as if they are being punished for their sexuality, which leads to higher incidence of depression, anxiety, and post-traumatic stress disorder. They also cited the response to Shepard's murder by many LGBT people, especially youth, who reported going back into the closet, fearing for their safety, experiencing a strong sense of self-loathing, and upset that the same thing could happen to them because of their sexual orientation.

== Background ==
The 1968 federal hate-crime law (18 U.S.C. § 245(b)(2)) extends to crimes motivated by actual or perceived race, color, religion, or national origin, and only while the victim is engaging in a federally protected activity, like voting or going to school. Penalties, under both the existing law and the LLEHCPA (Local Law Enforcement Hate Crimes Prevention Act, originally called the "Local Law Enforcement Enhancement Act"), for hate crimes involving firearms are prison terms of up to 10 years, while crimes involving kidnapping, sexual assault, or murder can bring life in prison. In 1990, Congress passed the Hate Crimes Statistics Act which allowed the government to count the incidence of hate crimes based on religion, race, national origin, and sexual orientation. However, a sentence was added onto the end of bill stating that federal funds should not be used to "promote or encourage homosexuality".

According to FBI statistics, of the over 113,000 hate crimes since 1991, 55% were motivated by racial bias, 17% by religious bias, 14% sexual orientation bias, 14% ethnicity bias, and 1% disability bias.

Although not necessarily on the same scale as Matthew Shepard's murder, violent incidences against gays and lesbians occur frequently. Gay and lesbian people are often verbally abused, assaulted both physically and sexually, and threatened not just by peers and strangers, but also by family members. One study of 192 gay men aged 14–21 found that approximately 1/3 reported being verbally assaulted by at least one family member when they came out and another 10% reported being physically assaulted. Gay and lesbian youth are particularly prone to victimization. A nationwide study of over 9,000 gay high school students revealed that 24% of gay men and 11% of gay women reported being victimized at least ten times a year due to their sexual orientation. Victims often experience severe depression, a sense of helplessness, low self-esteem, and frequent suicidal thoughts. Gay youth are two to four times more likely to be threatened with a deadly weapon at school and miss more days of school than their heterosexual peers. Further, they are two to seven times more likely to attempt suicide. Some feel these issues, the societal stigma around homosexuality and fear of bias-motivated attack, lead to gay men and women, especially teenagers, becoming more likely to abuse drugs such as marijuana and cocaine and alcohol, have unprotected sex with multiple sexual partners, find themselves in unwanted sexual situations, have body image and eating disorders, and be at higher risk for STDs and HIV/AIDS.

The Act was supported by thirty-one state Attorneys General and over 210 national law enforcement, professional, education, civil rights, religious, and civic organizations, including the AFL–CIO, the American Medical Association, the American Psychological Association, and the NAACP. A November 2001 poll indicated that 73% of Americans were in favor of hate-crime legislation covering sexual orientation.

The LLEHCPA was introduced in substantially similar form in each Congress since the 105th Congress in 1999. The 2007 bill expanded on the earlier versions by including transgender provisions and making it explicit that the law should not be interpreted to restrict people's freedom of speech or association.

== Opposition ==
James Dobson, founder of the socially conservative Focus on the Family, opposed the Act, arguing that it would effectively "muzzle people of faith who dare to express their moral and biblical concerns about homosexuality". However, H.R. 1592 contains a "Rule of Construction" which specifically provides that "Nothing in this Act...shall be construed to prohibit any expressive conduct protected from legal prohibition by, or any activities protected by the free speech or free exercise clauses of, the First Amendment to the Constitution".

Senator Jeff Sessions, among other senators, was concerned that the bill would not protect all individuals equally. Senator Jim DeMint of South Carolina spoke against the bill, saying that it was unnecessary, that it violated the 14th Amendment, and that it would be a step closer to the prosecution of "thought crimes". Four members of the U.S. Commission on Civil Rights wrote a letter stating their opposition to the bill, citing concerns of double jeopardy.

== Legislative progress ==
=== 106th Congress ===
The bill (S. 622) was introduced by Senator Edward Kennedy. It was referred to the Judiciary Committee.

=== 107th to 109th Congress ===
The bill was first introduced into the 107 Congress's House of Representatives on April 3, 2001, by Rep. John Conyers and was referred to the Subcommittee on Crime. The bill died when it failed to advance in the committee.

It was reintroduced by Rep. Conyers in the 108th and 109th congresses (on April 22, 2004, and May 26, 2005, respectively). As previously, it died both times when it failed to advance in committee.

Similar legislation was introduced by Sen. Gordon H. Smith (R–OR) as an amendment to the Ronald W. Reagan National Defense Authorization Act for Fiscal Year 2005 (S. 2400) on June 14, 2004. Although the amendment passed the U.S. Senate by a vote of 65–33, it was later removed by conference committee.

=== 110th Congress ===
The bill was introduced for the fourth time into the House on March 30, 2007, by Conyers. The 2007 version of the bill added gender identity to the list of suspect classes for prosecution of hate crimes. The bill was again referred to the Subcommittee on Crime, Terrorism and Homeland Security.

House vote on Local Law Enforcement Hate Crimes Prevention Act of 2007 Democratic yes Republican yes Abstention or no representative seated Democratic no Republican no

The bill passed the subcommittee by voice vote and the full House Judiciary Committee by a vote of 20–14. The bill then proceeded to the full House, where it was passed on May 3, 2007, with a vote of 237–180 with Representative Barney Frank, one of two openly gay members of the House at the time, presiding.

The bill then proceeded to the U.S. Senate, where it was introduced by Senator Ted Kennedy and Senator Gordon Smith on April 12, 2007. It was referred to the Senate Judiciary Committee. The bill died when it failed to advance in the Senate committee.

On July 11, 2007, Kennedy attempted to introduce the bill again as an amendment to the Senate Defense Re-authorization bill (H.R. 1585). The Senate hate crime amendment had 44 cosponsors, including four Republicans. After Republicans staged a filibuster on a troop-withdrawal amendment to the defense bill, Senate Majority Leader Harry Reid delayed the votes on the hate crime amendment and the defense bill until September.

The bill passed the Senate on September 27, 2007, as an amendment to the Defense Re-authorization bill. The cloture vote was 60–39 in favor. The amendment was then approved by voice vote. President Bush indicated he might veto the DoD authorization bill if it reached his desk with the hate crimes legislation attached. Ultimately, the amendment was dropped by the Democratic leadership because of opposition from antiwar Democrats, conservative groups, and Bush.

In late 2008, then-President-elect Barack Obama's website stated that one of the goals of his new administration would be to see the bill passed.

=== 111th Congress ===
==== House ====
House vote by congressional district Democratic yes Republican yes Abstention or no representative seated Democratic no Republican no

Conyers introduced the bill for the fifth time into the House on April 2, 2009. In his introductory speech, he claimed that many law enforcement groups, such as the International Association of Chiefs of Police, the National Sheriffs' Association and 31 state Attorneys General supported the bill and that the impact hate violence has on communities justified federal involvement.

The bill was immediately referred to the full Judiciary Committee, where it passed by a vote of 15–12 on April 23, 2009.

On April 28, 2009, Rep. Mike Honda (D-CA) claimed that if the bill were passed it may help prevent the murders of transgender Americans, such as the murder of Angie Zapata. Conversely, Rep. Steve King (R-IA) claimed that the bill was an expansion of a category of "thought crimes" and compared the bill to the book Nineteen Eighty-Four. That same day, the House Rules Committee allowed one hour and 20 minutes for debate.

The bill then moved to the full House, for debate. During the debate, Rep. Jan Schakowsky (D-IL) claimed that the bill would help prevent murders such as those of spree killer Benjamin Nathaniel Smith and would take "an important step" towards a more just society. After the vote, Rep. Trent Franks (R-AZ) claimed that equal protection regardless of status is a fundamental premise of the nation and thus the bill is unnecessary, and that, rather, it would prevent religious organizations from expressing their beliefs openly (although the bill only refers to violent actions, not speech.)

The bill passed the House on April 29, 2009, by a vote of 249–175, with support from 231 Democrats and 18 Republicans, including Republican Main Street Partnership members Judy Biggert (IL), Mary Bono Mack (CA), Joseph Cao (LA), Mike Castle (DE), Charlie Dent (PA), Lincoln Díaz-Balart (FL), Mario Díaz-Balart (FL), Rodney Frelinghuysen (NJ), Jim Gerlach (PA), Mark Kirk (IL), Leonard Lance (NJ), Frank LoBiondo (NJ), Todd Russell Platts (PA), Dave Reichert (WA), and Greg Walden (OR) along with Bill Cassidy (LA), Mike Coffman (CO), and Ileana Ros-Lehtinen (FL).

On April 30, 2009, Rep. Todd Tiahrt (R-KS) compared the bill to the novel Animal Farm and claimed it would harm free speech. Rep. George Miller (D-CA) and Rep. Dutch Ruppersberger (D-MD) both announced that they were unable to be present for the vote, but had they been present they would each have voted in favor. Conversely, Rep. Michael Burgess (R-TX) claimed federal law was already sufficient to prevent hate crimes and said that had he been present he would have voted against the bill.

On October 8, 2009, the House passed the Matthew Shepard and James Byrd Jr. Hate Crimes Prevention Act as part of the conference report on Defense Authorization for fiscal year 2010. The vote was 281–146, with support from 237 Democrats and 44 Republicans.

==== Senate ====
The Senate adopted amendment 1511 63–28 with 5 Republicans Both yes One yes, one did not vote One yes, one no One no, one did not vote Both no Both did not vote

The bill again proceeded to the Senate, where it was again introduced by Kennedy on April 28, 2009. The Senate version of the bill had 45 cosponsors as of July 8, 2009.

On June 25, 2009, the Senate Judiciary Committee held a hearing on the bill. Attorney General Eric Holder testified in support of the bill, the first time a sitting Attorney General has ever testified in favor of the bill. During his testimony, Holder mentioned his previous testimony on a nearly identical bill to the senate in July 1998 (the Hate Crimes Prevention Act of 1998, S. 1529), just months before Matthew Shepard was murdered. According to CNN, Holder testified that, "more than 77,000 hate crime incidents were reported by the FBI between 1998 and 2007, or 'nearly one hate crime for every hour of every day over the span of a decade.'" Holder emphasized that one of his "highest personal priorities ... is to do everything I can to ensure this critical legislation finally becomes law".

Reverend Mark Achtemeier of the University of Dubuque Theological Seminary; Janet Langhart, whose play was premiering at the United States Holocaust Museum at the time of the shooting earlier in the month; and Michael Lieberman of the Anti-Defamation League also testified in favor of the bill. Gail Heriot of the United States Commission on Civil Rights and Brian Walsh of The Heritage Foundation testified in opposition to the bill.

The Matthew Shepard Act was adopted as an amendment to S. 1390 (the National Defense Authorization Act for Fiscal Year 2010) by a 63–28 cloture vote on July 15, 2009. At the request of Senator Jeff Sessions (an opponent of the Matthew Shepard Act), an amendment was added to the Senate version of the hate crimes legislation that would have allowed prosecutors to seek the death penalty for hate crime murders, though the amendment was later removed in conference with the House. On July 20, 2009, Sessions introduced Amendment 1616, "the soldiers amendment," to extend hate crimes protections to personnel of the armed forces and their immediate family members, saying "This amendment would create a new Federal crime which puts members of the U.S. military on equal footing with other protected classes." Sen. Carl Levin affirmed the intent of the amendment before a roll call vote was called. The Soldiers Amendment passed unanimously in the Senate and eventually became 18 USC §1389 after the Matthew Shepherd Act was made law.

The bill won the support of five Republicans: Susan Collins (ME), Dick Lugar (IN), Lisa Murkowski (AK), Olympia Snowe (ME), and George Voinovich (OH).

=== Passage ===
House vote on 2009–2010 Defense Appropriations Democratic yes Republican yes Abstention or no representative seated Democratic no Republican no

Senate vote on 2009–2010 Defense Appropriations Both yes One yes, one didn't vote One yes, one no One no, one didn't vote Both no

The bill passed the Senate when the Defense bill passed on July 23, 2009. As originally passed, the House version of the defense bill did not include the hate crimes legislation, requiring the difference to be worked out in a conference committee. On October 7, 2009, the conference committee published the final version of the bill, which included the hate crimes amendment; the conference report was then passed by the House on October 8, 2009. On October 22, 2009, following a 64–35 cloture vote, the conference report was passed by the Senate by a vote of 68–29. The bill was signed into law on the afternoon of October 28, 2009, by President Barack Obama.

== Legislative history ==
Congress	Short title	Bill number	Date introduced	Sponsor	# of cosponsors	Latest status
107th Congress	Local Law Enforcement Hate Crimes Prevention Act of 2001	H.R. 1343	April 3, 2001	Rep. John Conyers (D-MI)	208	Died in the House Subcommittee on Crime
107th Congress	Local Law Enforcement Hate Crimes Prevention Act of 2001	S. 625	March 27, 2001	Sen. Ted Kennedy (D-MA)	50	Failed cloture motion 54–43
108th Congress	Local Law Enforcement Hate Crimes Prevention Act of 2004	H.R. 4204	April 22, 2004	Rep. John Conyers (D-MI)	178	Died in the House Subcommittee on Crime, Terrorism, and Homeland Security
108th Congress	Local Law Enforcement Hate Crimes Prevention Act of 2004	S.Amdt. 3183 to S. 2400	June 14, 2004	Sen. Gordon H. Smith (R-OR)	4	Passed in the Senate (65–33) as an amendment to the Ronald W. Reagan National Defense Authorization Act for Fiscal Year 2005 S. 2400; Removed from conference report
109th Congress	Local Law Enforcement Hate Crimes Prevention Act of 2005	H.R. 2662	May 26, 2005	Rep. John Conyers (D-MI)	159	Died in the House Subcommittee on Crime, Terrorism, and Homeland Security
109th Congress	Local Law Enforcement Hate Crimes Prevention Act of 2005	S. 1145	May 26, 2005	Sen. Ted Kennedy (D-MA)	45	Died in the Senate Judiciary Committee
110th Congress	Local Law Enforcement Hate Crimes Prevention Act of 2007	H.R. 1592	March 30, 2007	Rep. John Conyers (D-MI)	171	Passed the House (237–180)
110th Congress	Local Law Enforcement Hate Crimes Prevention Act of 2007	S. 1105	April 12, 2007	Sen. Ted Kennedy (D-MA)	44	Died in the Senate Judiciary Committee
111th Congress	Local Law Enforcement Hate Crimes Prevention Act of 2009	H.R. 1913	April 2, 2009	Rep. John Conyers (D-MI)	120	Passed the House (249–175) as an amendment to the National Defense Authorization Act for Fiscal Year 2010 H.R. 2647.
111th Congress	Local Law Enforcement Hate Crimes Prevention Act of 2009	S. 909	April 28, 2009	Sen. Ted Kennedy (D-MA)	45	Died in the Senate Judiciary Committee (after the Leahy version passed)
111th Congress	Local Law Enforcement Hate Crimes Prevention Act of 2009	S.Amdt. 1511 to S. 1390	July 15, 2009	Sen. Patrick Leahy (D-VT)	37	Passed in the Senate (63–28) as an amendment to the National Defense Authorization Act for Fiscal Year 2010. Signed into law October 28, 2009 by President Barack Obama.

== Enforcement ==
In May 2011, a man in Arkansas pleaded guilty to running a car containing five Hispanic men off the road. As a result, he became the first person convicted under the Act. A second man involved in the same incident was later convicted under the Act; his appeal of that conviction was denied on August 6, 2012.

In August 2011, one man in New Mexico pleaded guilty to branding a swastika into the arm of a developmentally disabled man of Navajo descent. A second man entered a guilty plea to conspiracy to commit a federal hate crime. The two men were accused of branding the victim, shaving a swastika into his head, and writing the words "white power" and the acronym "KKK" on his body. A third man in June 2011, entered a guilty plea to conspiracy to commit a federal hate crime. All three men were charged under the Act in December 2010.

On March 15, 2012, the Kentucky State Police assisted the FBI in arresting David Jenkins, Anthony Jenkins, Mable Jenkins, and Alexis Jenkins of Partridge, Kentucky, for the beating of Kevin Pennington during a late-night attack in April 2011 at Kingdom Come State Park, near Cumberland. The push came from the gay-rights group Kentucky Equality Federation, whose president, Jordan Palmer, began lobbying the U.S. Attorney for the Eastern District of Kentucky in August 2011 to prosecute after stating he had no confidence in the Harlan County Commonwealth's Attorney to act. "I think the case's notoriety may have derived in large part from the Kentucky Equality Federation efforts," said Kerry Harvey, the U.S. Attorney for the Eastern District of Kentucky. Mable Jenkins and Alexis Jenkins pleaded guilty.

In 2016, for the first time the Justice Department used the Act to bring criminal charges against a person for selecting a victim because of their gender identity. In that case Joshua Brandon Vallum plead guilty to murdering Mercedes Williamson in 2015 because she was transgender, in violation of the Act. In 2017, he was "sentenced to 49 years in prison and fined $20,000 for killing his ex-girlfriend because she was transgender." The Justice Department reported that "[t]his is the first case prosecuted under the Hate Crimes Prevention Act involving a victim targeted because of gender identity."

== Court challenges ==
The constitutionality of the law was challenged in a 2010 lawsuit filed by the Thomas More Law Center; the lawsuit was dismissed.

William Hatch, who pleaded guilty to a hate crime in the New Mexico case, also contested the law on Constitutional grounds. The Tenth Circuit Court of Appeals heard the case (U.S. v. Hatch) and upheld the conviction on June 3, 2013.

== See also ==
- David Ray Hate Crimes Prevention Act (2007)
- Emmett Till Anti-lynching Act (2022)
