= Same-sex marriage in Kentucky =

Same-sex marriage has been legal in Kentucky since the U.S. Supreme Court's ruling in Obergefell v. Hodges on June 26, 2015. On February 12, 2014, Judge John G. Heyburn II of the U.S. District Court for the Western District of Kentucky ruled that Kentucky must recognize same-sex marriages established in other jurisdictions in Bourke v. Beshear. On July 1, the same judge ruled in Love v. Beshear that Kentucky's denial of marriage licenses to same-sex couples violated the U.S. Constitution, but stayed implementation of both his decisions pending appeal. The Sixth Circuit Court of Appeals reversed both those decisions on November 6. The same-sex couples asked the U.S. Supreme Court to review that decision. On January 16, 2015, the U.S. Supreme Court consolidated these cases with three others and agreed to review the case as Obergefell v. Hodges. The decision, which struck down Kentucky's statutory and constitutional bans on same-sex marriages, was handed down on June 26, and Governor Steve Beshear and Attorney General Jack Conway announced almost immediately that the court's order would be implemented. Initially, four Kentucky counties were known to have refused, or announced they would refuse, to issue marriage licenses to same-sex couples, most notably Rowan County. By June 2016, however, all counties in Kentucky had begun issuing marriage licenses or had announced their intention to do so.

Kentucky had previously denied marriage rights to same-sex couples by statute since 1998 and in its State Constitution since 2004. Polling suggests that a majority of Kentucky residents support the legal recognition of same-sex marriage, with a 2024 Public Religion Research Institute poll showing that 62% of respondents supported same-sex marriage.

== Legal restrictions ==
=== Statutes ===
On November 9, 1973, the Kentucky Court of Appeals ruled in Jones v. Hallahan that two women were properly denied a marriage license in Louisville based on dictionary definitions of marriage, despite the fact that state statutes did not restrict marriage to opposite-sex couples. Its decision said that "in substance, the relationship proposed ... is not a marriage."

After the Hawaii Supreme Court seemed poised to legalize same-sex marriage in Hawaii in Baehr v. Miike in 1993, members of the Kentucky General Assembly began pressing for the passage of a bill banning same-sex marriage. Such a bill was introduced in the 1998 legislative session. It passed the Kentucky House of Representatives on March 11 by a vote of 84–9, and the Kentucky Senate approved the bill 13–2 on March 26. Senator Ernesto Scorsone was a vocal opponent of the legislation, stating on the floor of the Senate, "When you vote 'no' on this bill or abstain, you can go home and look your mail carrier in the eye, or you neighbor, or aunt or nephew or coworker, and say, 'I was asked to go against you and support the lies and prejudice', but I didn't give in to the pressure. I voted 'no'." Governor Paul E. Patton signed the bill into law on April 2, and it went into effect on July 15, 1998. The law defined marriage as "a relationship between a man and a woman", prohibited same-sex marriage and declared it contrary to public policy, and denied recognition to same-sex marriages from other jurisdictions. Kentucky's only recognition of same-sex relationships was its extension of hospital visitation rights to same-sex couples through a designated visitor statute.

=== Constitutional amendment ===
In November 2004, Kentucky voters approved Amendment 1, a constitutional amendment banning same-sex marriage. It read: "Only a marriage between one man and one woman shall be valid or recognized as a marriage in Kentucky. A legal status identical or substantially similar to that of marriage for unmarried individuals shall not be valid or recognized."

== Lawsuits ==
Same-sex marriage in the United States

=== Bourke v. Beshear ===
On July 26, 2013, a same-sex couple legally married in Canada filed a lawsuit in the U.S. District Court for the Western District of Kentucky, challenging Kentucky's refusal to recognize their marriage. That case was filed by the Fauver Law Office. Three other married same-sex couples, and their children, were later added as plaintiffs. Governor Steve Beshear and Attorney General Jack Conway were the named defendants. The plaintiffs in Bourke argued that Kentucky should recognize same-sex marriages from other jurisdictions. The case was assigned to Judge John G. Heyburn II.

In a decision issued on February 12, 2014, Judge Heyburn found that Kentucky must recognize same-sex marriages from other jurisdictions because withholding recognition violated the U.S. Constitution's guarantee of equal protection. His final order, issued on February 27, 2014, made recognition of out-of-state same-sex marriages de jure legal; being a final order it was then immediately subject to appeal. Heyburn stayed his decision for 21 days the next day. On March 4, the Attorney General of Kentucky, Jack Conway, announced that he would neither appeal the state's position nor request further stays. Governor Beshear said he would employ outside counsel to appeal Heyburn's ruling in Bourke to the Sixth Circuit Court of Appeals and to request a stay pending appeal. On March 19, Judge Heyburn extended his stay pending appeal, noting the stay granted by the U.S. Supreme Court in a similar Utah case. On the same date, the defendants lodged an interlocutory appeal of Bourke in the Sixth Circuit. Oral arguments in the case were held on August 6, 2014.

=== Love v. Beshear ===
On February 14, 2014, two same-sex couples who were denied marriage licenses in Kentucky asked to be allowed to intervene in Bourke. As Judge Heyburn issued a final order in Bourke, he bifurcated the case and allowed the new plaintiffs to intervene and argue against Kentucky's denial of marriage licenses to same-sex couples. This portion of the case remained in district court, retitled as Love v. Beshear. A briefing schedule on this issue was completed by May 28. On July 1, Judge Heyburn found in favor of the intervening same-sex couple plaintiffs in Love and ruled that Kentucky's ban on allowing same-sex couples to marry violated the Equal Protection Clause of the U.S. Constitution, writing:

[A]llowing same-sex couples the state recognition, benefits, and obligations of marriage does not in any way diminish those enjoyed by opposite-sex married couples. No one has offered any evidence that recognizing same-sex marriages will harm opposite-sex marriages, individually or collectively. One's belief to the contrary, however sincerely held, cannot alone justify denying a selected group their constitutional rights. [N]o court can require churches or other religious institutions to marry same-sex couples or any other couple, for that matter. This is part of our constitutional guarantee of freedom of religion. That decision will always be based on religious doctrine. What this opinion does, however, is make real the promise of equal protection under the law. It will profoundly affect validly married same-sex couples’ experience of living in the Commonwealth and elevate their marriage to an equal status in the eyes of state law.

The Sixth Circuit Court of Appeals consolidated Love with Bourke v. Beshear. It heard oral arguments on August 6, the same day it heard same-sex marriage cases originating in Michigan, Ohio, and Tennessee.

=== Appellate decision and Supreme Court review ===
On November 6, the Sixth Circuit ruled 2–1 in both cases that Kentucky's ban on same-sex marriage did not violate the U.S. Constitution. It said it was bound by the U.S. Supreme Court's 1972 action a similar case, Baker v. Nelson, which dismissed a same-sex couple's marriage claim "for want of a substantial federal question." Writing for the majority, Judge Jeffrey Sutton also dismissed the arguments made on behalf of same-sex couples in this case: "Not one of the plaintiffs' theories, however, makes the case for constitutionalizing the definition of marriage and for removing the issue from the place it has been since the founding: in the hands of state voters." Dissenting, Judge Martha Craig Daughtrey wrote: "Because the correct result is so obvious, one is tempted to speculate that the majority has purposefully taken the contrary position to create the circuit split regarding the legality of same-sex marriage that could prompt a grant of certiorari by the Supreme Court and an end to the uncertainty of status and the interstate chaos that the current discrepancy in state laws threatens." The same-sex couples filed a petition for a writ of certiorari with the U.S. Supreme Court on November 17.

On January 16, 2015, the U.S. Supreme Court consolidated these cases with three others and agreed to review the case as Obergefell v. Hodges. The Supreme Court ruled against the states and reversed the judgment of the Sixth Circuit on June 26, 2015, requiring all states in the United States to license marriages between couples of the same sex based on the Due Process and Equal Protection clauses of the Fourteenth Amendment. Governor Beshear ordered county clerks to begin issuing marriage licenses to same-sex couples, "Neither your oath nor the Supreme Court dictate what you must believe. But as elected officials, they do prescribe how we must act", he wrote to county clerks. Among the first couples to marry were Tadd Roberts and Benjamin Moore in Louisville, and Marc Roland and Scott Shive in Lexington on Friday afternoon just hours after the court ruling. Licenses were issued in at least five counties that Friday, June 26; Jefferson, Fayette, Kenton, Meade and Hancock counties.

=== Kentucky Equality Federation v. Beshear ===
On April 16, 2015, Kentucky Equality Federation v. Beshear was ruled on by Franklin County Circuit Court Judge Thomas D. Wingate. Judge Wingate sided with the Kentucky Equality Federation against the state. At the request of Governor Steve Beshear's legal representation, Judge Wingate stayed the order pending a ruling from a Kentucky appellate court, such as the Kentucky Court of Appeals or Kentucky's court of last resort, the Kentucky Supreme Court, or the U.S. Supreme Court. Judge Wingate ruled that "Kentucky's statutory and constitutional bans on same-sex marriage [are] void and unenforceable for violating Plaintiff and Plaintiff's Members Constitutional Rights".

== Developments after legalization ==
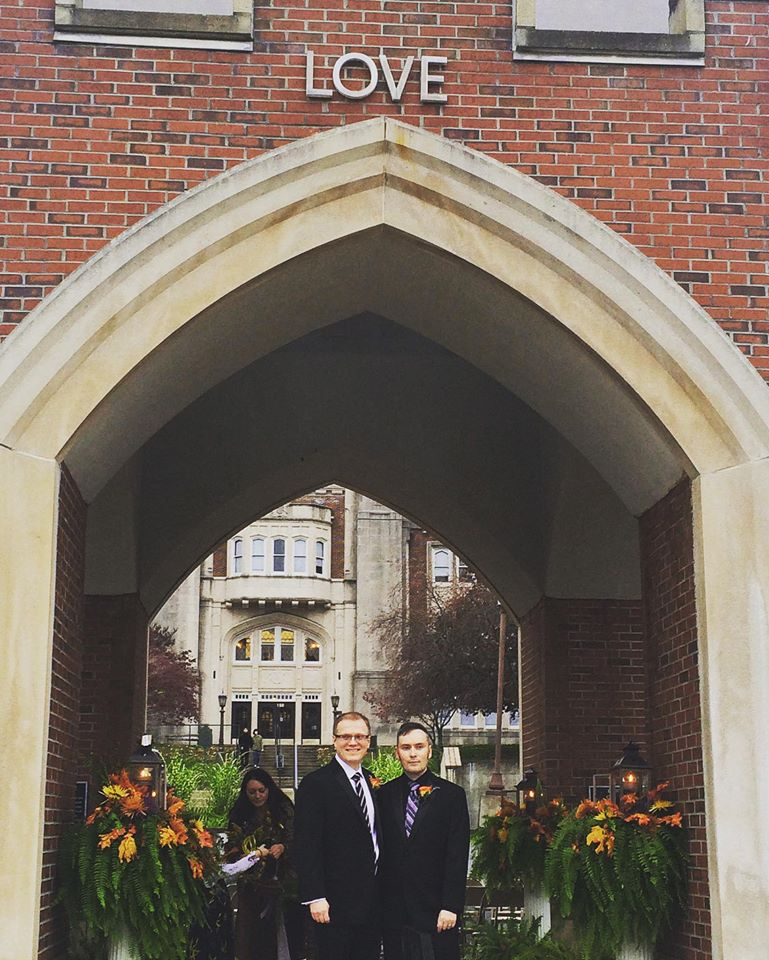
David Ermold and David Moore at the Little Bell Tower on the campus of Morehead State University, later married after being refused a marriage license

After the Supreme Court ruling in 2015 striking down bans on same-sex marriage across the United States, David Ermold and David Moore, a same-sex couple from Morehead and alumni of Morehead State University, released video footage of the Rowan County Clerk, Kim Davis, refusing to issue them a marriage license under "God's Authority." The video went viral overnight, and it caused an international outrage against the actions of the county clerk. Davis opposed same-sex marriage, but to avoid the appearance of discrimination against gay people, she refused to issue marriage licenses to any couples, opposite-sex or same-sex. In total, six couples, four represented by the American Civil Liberties Union (ACLU), and two couples with separate legal representation, sued Davis in her official capacity as county clerk.

On August 12, 2015, Judge David Bunning of the U.S. District Court for the Eastern District of Kentucky ruled in Miller v. Davis that she had to issue the licenses. Davis requested a stay, and Bunning granted it until the end of the month. Davis asked for the stay to be extended so that she could appeal the decision, but a three-judge panel of the Sixth Circuit denied her request, noting that "she had little to no chance to succeed on appeal on the merits of her case". On August 31, the U.S. Supreme Court denied her emergency application to extend the stay.

On September 1, the plaintiff couples again sought marriage licenses, but Davis defied the court's order and did not issue them. On September 3, following a motion by the plaintiffs, Judge Bunning jailed Davis for contempt of court. Beginning on September 4, five of the six deputy clerks in the Rowan County Clerk's Office began issuing marriage licenses to same-sex couples, as they had been court-ordered to do so. The exception was her son, Nathan Davis, a deputy clerk under her immediate supervision. Once Davis was released from jail, she confiscated the marriage license forms and instructed her deputy clerks to only use forms from which her name and any reference to the clerk's office had been removed. In place of the title "county clerk" or "deputy clerk," which in Kentucky statute was required on the form, Davis replaced the title with "notary public". Subsequently, Governor Steve Beshear ordered all county clerks to abide by the U.S. Supreme Court ruling in Obergefell. Governor Beshear was asked by Judge Bunning to brief the court on the validity of the altered licenses. Governor Beshear acknowledged that Kentucky would recognize the licenses being issued in Rowan County, but he could not verify the legality of the licenses issued or the means in which the marriage licenses were altered. In July 2017, a federal court judge ruled that Kentucky must pay legal fees and court costs (nearly $225,000) to the lawyers who represented the couples who were denied marriage licenses. On March 19, 2022, Judge Bunning ruled that Davis knowingly violated the rights of same-sex couples by denying them marriage licenses, "It is readily apparent that Obergefell recognizes Plaintiffs' Fourteenth Amendment right to marry. It is also readily apparent that Davis made a conscious decision to violate Plaintiffs' right". In September 2023, Ermold and Moore were each awarded $50,000 in damages.

As of October 2, 2015, three counties in Kentucky were refusing or had not been confirmed to be ready to issue licenses to same-sex couples. Clerks in Whitley and Casey counties claimed that the First Amendment of the U.S. Constitution or Section Five of the Kentucky Constitution protected their religious freedom to refuse to issue licenses to same-sex couples. Knott County officials refused to state whether they would issue a license to a same-sex couple, but none had applied to do so. The Whitley County clerk claimed technical issues prevented the issuing of licenses, saying licenses would be issued once difficulties were resolved. However, reports regarding Whitley County Clerk Kay Schwartz's appearance at a religious rally outside the Kentucky State Capitol on August 22, 2015, shed new light on the reason behind the delay. Schwartz claimed that issuing the licenses violated her religious liberty. She participated in the event alongside Rowan County's Kim Davis and Casey County's Casey Davis. The event was organized by the conservative Christian group, The Family Foundation.

On April 1, 2016, the Kentucky General Assembly unanimously passed legislation creating a single marriage license form for both same-sex and opposite-sex couples. The bill, which had the support of Governor Matt Bevin and Kim Davis, gives a marriage license applicant the option of checking "bride", "groom" or "spouse" beside their name. The name of the county clerk does not appear on the license. The Kentucky Senate passed an initial version of the bill on March 9, 37–0, but the House amended it on March 26, 97–0. Initially, the bill would have created two forms of marriage licenses, one using "bride" and "groom", and the other one using "first party" and "second party". The Senate passed the amended version, which created the single marriage form, on April 1 by a unanimous 36–0 vote. Governor Bevin signed the bill into law on April 13, 2016, and it took effect on July 14. In June 2016, Chris Hartmann, director of the Fairness Campaign, said to his knowledge "there are no counties where marriage licenses are being denied to same-sex couples" in the state. On June 22, 2016, when the Washington Blade reached out to Casey Davis' office over the phone, a clerk who works with Davis, replied "yes" when asked if a same-sex couple would be eligible to receive a marriage license in Casey County.

== Demographics and marriage statistics ==
Data from the 2000 U.S. census showed that 7,114 same-sex couples were living in Kentucky. By 2005, this had increased to 9,710 couples, likely attributed to same-sex couples' growing willingness to disclose their partnerships on government surveys. Same-sex couples lived in all counties of the state and constituted 0.8% of coupled households and 0.4% of all households in the state. Most couples lived in Jefferson, Fayette and Kenton counties, but the counties with the highest percentage of same-sex couples were Lyon (0.97% of all county households) and Lewis (0.81%). Same-sex partners in Kentucky were on average younger than opposite-sex partners, and more likely to be employed. In addition, the average and median household incomes of same-sex couples were higher than different-sex couples, but same-sex couples were far less likely to own a home than opposite-sex partners. 15% of same-sex couples in Kentucky were raising children under the age of 18, with an estimated 2,469 children living in households headed by same-sex couples in 2005.

The 2020 U.S. census showed that there were 6,887 married same-sex couple households (2,756 male couples and 4,131 female couples) and 6,532 unmarried same-sex couple households in Kentucky.

== Public opinion ==
Public opinion for same-sex marriage in Kentucky
Poll source	Dates administered	Sample size	Margin of error	Support	Opposition	Do not know / refused
Public Religion Research Institute	February 28 – December 8, 2025	315 adults	?	62%	35%	3%
Public Religion Research Institute	March 13 – December 2, 2024	322 adults	?	57%	41%	2%
Public Religion Research Institute	March 9 – December 7, 2023	314 adults	?	56%	41%	3%
Public Religion Research Institute	March 11 – December 14, 2022	?	?	57%	42%	1%
Public Religion Research Institute	March 8 – November 9, 2021	?	?	58%	42%	<0.5%
Public Religion Research Institute	January 7 – December 20, 2020	711 adults	?	48%	46%	6%
Public Religion Research Institute	April 5 – December 23, 2017	1,017 adults	?	51%	42%	7%
Public Religion Research Institute	May 18, 2016 – January 10, 2017	1,463 adults	?	49%	42%	9%
Public Religion Research Institute	April 29, 2015 – January 7, 2016	1,289 adults	?	45%	47%	8%
Survey USA	March 3–8, 2015	1,917 registered voters	± 2.3%	33%	57%	10%
Public Religion Research Institute	April 2, 2014 – January 4, 2015	814 adults	?	40%	54%	6%
New York Times/CBS News/YouGov	September 20 – October 1, 2014	1,689 likely voters	± 2.8%	38%	50%	12%
Public Policy Polling	August 7–10, 2014	991 voters	± 3.1%	30%	61%	9%
Bluegrass Poll	July 18–23, 2014	714 registered voters	± 3.7%	37%	50%	13%
New York Times/Kaiser Family Foundation	April 8–15, 2014	891 registered voters	?	38%	54%	8%
Bluegrass Poll	January 30 – February 4, 2014	1,082 registered voters	± 3.0%	35%	55%	10%
Public Policy Polling	April 11, 2013	?	?	27%	65%	8%

== See also ==
- LGBT rights in Kentucky
- Same-sex marriage in the United States
