= James Zimmerman =

James Zimmerman may refer to:

- James Edward Zimmerman, co-inventor of the radio-frequency superconducting quantum interference device (SQUID)
- James Fulton Zimmerman, American historian and professor of political science
- James Zimmerman (politician), member of the Kentucky House of Representatives

== See also ==
- James Zimmermann, British tennis player
