= Kentucky Equality Federation =

LGBT rights organization

- Abbreviation: KEF
- Formation: November 1, 2005
- Type: NGO
- Purpose: LGBT rights
- Headquarters: Lexington, Kentucky (USA)
- Region served: Kentucky (USA)
- President: Jordan Palmer
- Main organ: Board of Directors
- Affiliations: Marriage Equality Kentucky, Kentucky HIV/AIDS Advocacy Campaign, Kentucky Equality PAC, and Kentucky Equal Ballot Access
- Staff: 3
- Volunteers: 18
- Website: www.kentuckyequality.org

Kentucky Equality Federation is an umbrella organization for gay, lesbian, bisexual, and transgender civil rights in the Commonwealth of Kentucky, consisting of Federation for Kentucky Equality, Inc., Kentucky Equality Coalition, Inc., and Kentucky Equality PAC. Kentucky Equality Federation is a member of the International Lesbian, Gay, Bisexual, Trans and Intersex Association (ILGA).

== Name ==
Originally called Kentucky Equal Rights, the organization changed its name to Kentucky Equality, with either "Association" or "Federation" always appearing afterward. Kentucky Equality has "The Equality Party", "Commonwealth Equality", "Kentucky Equality Federation", and "Kentucky Equality Association" listed as assumed names with the Kentucky Secretary of State.

== Mission ==
Kentucky Equality Federation believes all people are endowed with inalienable rights to life, liberty, property, and the pursuit of happiness and fulfillment free from oppression, discrimination, school bullying, and hate crimes regardless of gender identity, sexual orientation, race, creed, veteran status, political affiliation, or any other defining characteristic. The end of discrimination is not simply the elimination of flagrant abuses, rather it is the ability of a person to fully exercise their Kentucky human rights to the same full extent enjoyed by their peers, without fear of retribution, aspersion, or harm, be that harm political or social.

Kentucky Equality Federation assists and acts as public advocate for people who have been bullied, discriminated against, or victimized in addition to assisting them with legal remedies. When the laws have not caught up to the moral needs of society, we will seek their modification, pursuant to the creation of a just society.

== Member organizations ==
The following organizations are listed a members of Kentucky Equality Federation:

- Marriage Equality Kentucky
- Kentucky HIV/AIDS Advocacy Campaign
- Kentucky Equal Ballot Access

== Management structure ==
The corporations that make-up Kentucky Equality Federation are formal membership organizations. The acceptance of new members must be approved by unanimous vote of existing members ("Permanent and Official Membership"). Permanent and Official Membership have a say in the structure and priorities of the organizations. Permanent and Official Membership elect the Board of Directors and the President; they must also approve amendments to Bylaws. Permanent and Official Membership ensure the continuation of Kentucky Equality Federation; both the Board of Directors and the President serve at the pleasure of Permanent and Official Membership. All non-board members serve at the pleasure of the president.

=== Committees ===
- Public Relations Committee
- Kentucky Discrimination and School Bullying Committee
- Planning Committee
- Transgender Special Advisory Committee
- Fundraising Committee.

== Activities and history ==
In early 2006 Jordan Palmer founded Kentucky Equal Rights (later renamed Kentucky Equality Federation by a majority vote of its members) to advance the interests of gay, lesbian, bisexual, and transgender people in the Commonwealth of Kentucky.

In March 2007 the Kentucky Equality Federation won a MySpace Impact Award (since 2006) in the area of Social Justice, beating Do Something and Loose Change to Loosen Change. The Federation was awarded a $10,000.00 cash prize and promotional support from MySpace.

=== Boone County High School ===
Kentucky Equality was involved getting the first Gay-Straight Alliance approved at Boone County High School in Northern Kentucky. On July 19, 2006, Boone County High School ended more than a year of stonewalling and avoided a federal and state lawsuit by finally approving the formation of a Gay-Straight Alliance. Jordan Palmer, founder and president of the Kentucky Equality Federation, warned school officials that he would file a lawsuit in federal court for violating the federal Equal Access Act which requires schools to treat Gay-Straight Alliances as they would any other school group, and a separate lawsuit with the Kentucky Court of Justice for violating the Kentucky Education Reform Act.

=== Incident with Representative Fischer ===
Prior to the November 2006 General Election Kentucky Equality Federation President Jordan Palmer verbally attacked Kentucky Representative Joseph Fisher (R) after he stated "homosexuals have not experienced the same type of insidious discrimination in housing and employment as blacks and women." In addition, Fischer stated he believed homosexuals could easily change their sexual orientation.

=== Complaint resolution and public advocate ===
On September 7, 2006, the Kentucky Equality Federation announced they would act as a "buffer" for victims of discrimination, hate crimes, and school bullying establishing a toll-free number, (877) KEF-5775 and an online complaint system to report incidents. The federation stated they believe a lot of incidents go unreported each year throughout Kentucky because of bad experiences in working with law enforcement, while others feared being "outed" or reprisals would ensue from their perpetrators.

=== Relationship with Kentucky Fairness Alliance ===
On January 9, 2008, Kentucky Equality Federation's General Advisory Council condemned Kentucky Fairness Alliance. According to published reports, one reason for the dispute between the two organizations was related to Bluegrass Fairness of Central Kentucky, once a chapter of Kentucky Fairness Alliance. Kentucky Equality Federation's General Advisory Council also cited problems in working with the Executive Director of Kentucky Fairness Alliance.

The condemnation was short lived; on April 18, 2008, Kentucky Equality Federation's Board of Directors rescinded the General Advisory Council's condemnation of Kentucky Fairness Alliance and terminated 9 of the 14 members on the General Advisory Council.

=== University of the Cumberlands ===
Kentucky Equality led a protest at the Governor's Annual Derby Breakfast on May 6, 2006. The protest was in response to Governor Ernie Fletcher's refusal to veto funding to the University of the Cumberlands after expelling a student for revealing he was gay on the social networking site MySpace.

On July 7, 2009, Kentucky Equality Federation condemned the University of the Cumberlands for uninviting the Broadway Baptist Church of Texas' church choir from participating in its community based Mountain Outreach Program because of their "tolerant stance toward homosexuality." The following day Kentucky Equality Federation also condemned $1.2 million in federal funding to expand programs at the university.

==== Denied marriage licenses ====
In February 2009 Palmer organized gay and lesbian couples going to county court clerks offices in Kentucky to apply for a same-sex marriage license only to be denied. Palmer told the media his intention was to raise awareness of Kentucky's ban on same-sex marriages. The action was condemned by the Family Foundation of Kentucky, which Palmer dismissed as "another example of how so-called family organizations are some of the most useless, money-hungry scams in the world with their bizarre and all-encompassing 'gay fetish.'" Palmer later organized churches refusing to sign marriage licenses until gay marriage was recognized in Kentucky.

=== Federal hate crime conviction ===
On March 15, 2012, the Kentucky State Police assisted the FBI in arresting David Jenkins, Anthony Jenkins, Mable Jenkins, and Alexis Jenkins of Partridge, Kentucky, for the beating of Kevin Pennington during a late-night attack in April 2011 at Kingdom Come State Park, near Cumberland. The push came from the gay-rights group Kentucky Equality Federation, whose president, Jordan Palmer, began lobbying Washington, D.C., to prosecute after stating he had no confidence in the Harlan County Commonwealth's Attorney to act. "I think the case's notoriety may have derived in large part from the Kentucky Equality Federation efforts," said Kerry Harvey, the U.S. Attorney for the Eastern District of Kentucky. Mable Jenkins and Alexis Jenkins pleaded guilty.

=== Billboard removal ===
On May 25, 2012, a controversial billboard condemning homosexuality and abortion was posted on New Circle Road near Leestown Road in Lexington, KY. That same billboard was later stolen, defaced, and displayed in a local Lexington eatery. The billboard owner replaced the billboard shortly thereafter. The Kentucky Equality Federation, after receiving a complaint, took action. On July 31, 2012, the billboard was confirmed as removed citing complaints launched by Jordan Palmer, President, and Brandon Combs, Chairman of the Board.

=== Marriage equality lawsuit ===
On September 10, 2013, the Kentucky Equality Federation sued the Commonwealth of Kentucky in Franklin Circuit Court claiming Kentucky's 2004 Constitutional Amendment banning same-sex marriage violated sections of the commonwealth's constitution. Case # 13-CI-1074 was assigned by the Franklin County Court Clerk (the location of the Kentucky State Capitol). The lawsuit was conceived by President Jordan Palmer, written and signed by Vice President of Legal Jillian Hall, Esq. Jordan Palmer stated to the media that:

Kentucky added a facially unconstitutional amendment to its constitution via a ballot initiative process. Thus, the attempt to abrogate constitutional sensibilities in favor of a ballot initiative, as was done for Section 233A of the Kentucky Constitution in 2004, is against the very notion of equal protection as guaranteed to each and all of Kentucky's population. This should be held as true as a matter of law by the Courts, regardless of the ballot's outcome.

Governor Steve Beshear's legal representatives initially responded by citing foreign laws, and that gay and lesbian people could not reproduce as a reason to quash the lawsuit.

==== Ruling ====
On April 16, 2015, Kentucky Equality Federation v. Beshear, also known as Kentucky Equality Federation v. Commonwealth of Kentucky, was ruled on by Franklin County Circuit Court Judge Thomas D. Wingate. Judge Wingate sided with Kentucky Equality Federation against the Commonwealth and struck down Kentucky Constitutional Amendment banning same-sex marriages. Judge Wingate also struck down all laws passed by the Kentucky General Assembly. At the request of Governor Steve Beshear's legal representation, the Judge also placed a stay on the order pending a ruling from a Kentucky appellate court (such as the Kentucky Court of Appeals or Kentucky's court of last resort, the Kentucky Supreme Court) or the U.S. Supreme Court. The lawsuit was a significant victory for the Kentucky Equality Federation and the same-sex marriage civil rights movement.

Kentucky's statutory and constitutional bans on same-sex marriage void and unenforceable for violating Plaintiff and Plaintiff's Members Constitutional Rights", ruled Judge Wingate.

.

== Key people ==
=== Jordan Palmer ===
Jordan Palmer is an American social activist, Kentucky politician, civil rights activist, entrepreneur, and the founder of the Kentucky Equality Federation. Palmer is from Hazard, Kentucky and is credited for having Kentucky Constitutional Amendment 1 (banning same-sex marriage), being struck down by a Kentucky judge, pushing the first hate crime convictions under the Matthew Shepard and James Byrd Jr. Hate Crimes Prevention Act, and holding the first equality protests against a sitting governor and members of the Kentucky House of Representatives.

On July 14, 2011, Matthew Vanderpool, the first openly gay person to run for the Kentucky House of Representatives, and Palmer's roommate, committed suicide. Palmer was also the campaign manager for Vanderpool.

Palmer stepped down in 2012 from the Kentucky Equality Federation. In 2014, he ran running for Kentucky State Senate, being the first openly gay person in Kentucky to do so. Palmer lost to the incumbent and returned to lead the Kentucky Equality Federation and its member organizations.

On July 9, 2021, Palmer threatened to sue the Leslie County Board of Education in Southeastern Kentucky for not allowing a lesbian couple to attend prom together and painting over a pride flag.

As of 2023, Palmer continued to be an advocate for equality across Kentucky and the United States.

In 2024, Palmer appears to have left social activism behind, appearing on WKYT-TV Morning Kentucky to promote his new medical spa.

==== Personal life ====
Palmer is the son of a Church of Christ minister.

==== Marriage Equality USA ====
Palmer served on the board of directors of Marriage Equality USA from 2006 to 2009. Palmer worked across the state of California to fight 2008 California Proposition 8. During and after the No Prop 8 Campaign, Palmer told change.org and Time Magazine that he was concerned that the organization did not utilize the grassroots community to its potential and recognize the harm associated with a campaign run by political consultants without sufficient accountability or transparency to the larger community.

==== First hate crime convictions ====
When Kevin Pennington was attacked in the Appalachian mountains, Palmer demanded the U.S. Department of Justice prosecute his assailants under the U.S. Matthew Shepherd and James Byrd Jr. Hate Crimes Prevention Act. Palmer succeeded and was active in the preparation of the trail. David Jason Jenkins, of Cumberland, and Anthony Ray Jenkins, of Partridge, was indicted and convicted in U.S. District Court in London, KY.

After the trial, the U.S. Attorney's Office for the Eastern District of Kentucky promised to step-up hate crime conviction, a move hailed as progress by Palmer.

== See also ==
- LGBT rights in the United States
- LGBT rights in Kentucky
- List of LGBT rights organizations
