= 2017 Kentucky Senate Bill 17 =

Religious freedom law in Kentucky, USA

Senate Bill 17 (SB 17) is a 2017 law in Kentucky, United States, designed to protect religious freedoms at public schools and post-secondary institutions in the state. The law allows students to express religious views in their assignments, allows teachers to include religious lessons, and permits school clubs and other campus organizations to exclude members on religious grounds. The law has been criticized by LGBTQ advocates, who contend that this last provision permits student organizations to discriminate on the basis of sexual orientation.

== Passage ==
On February 10, 2017, the Kentucky State Senate voted 31 in favor and 3 against SB 17. On March 6, 2017, the Kentucky House of Representatives voted 81 in favor and 8 against SB 17. On March 16, 2017, Governor Matt Bevin signed SB 17, which went into effect on June 26, 2017.

== See also ==
- LGBT rights in Kentucky
