= 2004 Kentucky Amendment 1 =

Referendum to ban same-sex marriage

Amendment 1
- November 2, 2004
- Are you in favor of amending the Kentucky Constitution to provide that only a marriage between one man and one woman shall be a marriage in Kentucky, and that a legal status identical to or similar to marriage for unmarried individuals shall not be valid or recognized?

Results
Choice	Votes	%
Yes	1,222,125	74.56%
No	417,097	25.44%
Valid votes	1,639,222	91.28%
Invalid or blank votes	156,660	8.72%
Total votes	1,795,882	100.00%
Registered voters/turnout	2,794,286	58.7%
County results
Yes
90–100%
80–90%
70–80%
60–70%
50–60%

Kentucky Constitutional Amendment 1 of 2004, is an amendment to the Kentucky Constitution that made it unconstitutional for the state to recognize or perform same-sex marriages or civil unions. The referendum was approved by 75% of the voters.

== Text ==
The text of the amendment states:

Only a marriage between one man and one woman shall be valid or recognized as a marriage in Kentucky. A legal status identical or substantially similar to that of marriage for unmarried individuals shall not be valid or recognized.

== Legislative history ==
Amendments to the Kentucky Constitution require 3/5 support in both houses of the General Assembly and a majority vote by referendum; they can not be vetoed by the governor. The amendment was first introduced in the 2004 Kentucky General Assembly as Senate Bill 245. The bill subsequently passed both houses.

=== First Senate vote ===
The bill was initially passed by the senate on March 11 by a 33–4 vote.

=== House vote ===
Map of the vote Democratic yea (51) Democratic nay (10) Democratic not voting (3) Republican yea (34) Republican nay (1) Republican not voting (1)

The bill was approved by the house, with an amendment, on April 12 by a 85–11 vote.

House of Representatives vote
Party	Votes for	Votes against	Not voting
Democratic (64)	51	10: Paul Bather; Jack Coleman; Jesse Crenshaw; Derrick Graham; Joni Jenkins; Mary Lou Marzian; Reginald Meeks; Ruth Ann Palumbo; Kathy Stein; Jim Wayne	3
Republican (36)	34	1: Tim Feeley	1
Total (100)	85	11	4

=== Second Senate vote ===
Map of the vote Republican yea (21) Republican nay (1) Democratic yea (12) Democratic nay (4)

The bill was approved by the senate again, with the house amendment, on April 13 by a 33–5 vote.

Senate vote
Party	Votes for	Votes against
Democratic (16)	12	4: David Karem; Gerald Neal; Ernesto Scorsone; Tim Shaughnessy
Republican (22)	21	1: Lindy Casebier
Total (38)	33	5

== Legal challenges ==
On September 10, 2013, the Kentucky Equality Federation sued the Commonwealth of Kentucky in Franklin Circuit Court claiming Kentucky's 2004 Constitutional Amendment banning same-sex marriage violated sections of the commonwealth's constitution. Case # 13-CI-1074 was assigned by the Franklin County Court Clerk (the location of the Kentucky State Capitol). The lawsuit was conceived by President Jordan Palmer, written and signed by Vice President of Legal Jillian Hall, Esq. On April 16, 2015, the case was decided in favor of the plaintiff by Franklin County Circuit Court Judge Thomas D. Wingate.

This provision also became void in 2015 when the U.S. Supreme Court ruled in Obergefell v. Hodges that the fundamental right to marry is guaranteed to same-sex couples by both the Due Process Clause and the Equal Protection Clause of the Fourteenth Amendment to the United States Constitution.

== Results ==
Amendment 1
Choice	Votes	%
For	1,222,125	74.56
Against	417,097	25.44
Total	1,639,222	100.00
Registered voters/turnout	3,057,741	53.6

== See also ==
- LGBT rights in Kentucky
- Same-sex marriage in Kentucky
