= LGBTQ rights in Kentucky =

- Kentucky (USA)
- Legal status: Legal since 1992 (Kentucky v. Wasson)
- Gender identity: Transgender individuals may alter their birth certificate after sex-reassignment surgery
- Discrimination protections: Sexual orientation and gender identity protections (see below)

Family rights
- Recognition of relationships: Same-sex marriage since 2015
- Restrictions: Kentucky Constitutional Amendment 1 limits marriage to one man and one woman (not enforceable), and prohibits non-marriage same-sex unions.
- Adoption: Single homosexuals may adopt; Homosexual couples may adopt

Lesbian, gay, bisexual, transgender, and queer (LGBTQ) people in the U.S. state of Kentucky still face some legal challenges not experienced by other people. Same-sex sexual activity in Kentucky has been legally permitted since 1992, although the state legislature has not repealed its sodomy statute for same-sex couples. Same-sex marriage is legal in Kentucky under the U.S. Supreme Court ruling in Obergefell v. Hodges. The decision, which struck down Kentucky's statutory and constitutional bans on same-sex marriages and all other same-sex marriage bans elsewhere in the country, was handed down on June 26, 2015.

Like some Southern states in the U.S., Kentucky has generally been viewed as socially conservative; however, recent polls indicate that a slim majority (51 percent) of Kentuckians support same-sex marriage, and support has been increasing over time. In 2010, Lexington elected its first openly gay mayor, Jim Gray, who went on to become the first openly LGBT Senate candidate from Kentucky in 2016. Several cities in the state prohibit discrimination in employment, housing, and accommodations based on sexual orientation and gender identity. The Louisville-based Fairness Campaign, founded in 1991, is the state's oldest and largest LGBT advocacy organization in operation. In 2008, a Fairness Coalition was formed to collectively advance LGBT anti-discrimination protections in the commonwealth; its members are the American Civil Liberties Union of Kentucky, Fairness Campaign, Kentucky Commission on Human Rights, and Lexington Fairness.

== Laws against homosexuality ==
In 1992, the Kentucky Supreme Court ruled the section of Kentucky's sodomy statute criminalizing consensual sodomy violated the Kentucky state constitution. In overturning the consensual sodomy statute (KRS 510.100) in the Kentucky v. Wasson case, the Kentucky Supreme Court decriminalized consensual sodomy. The statute remains on the books but remains unenforceable. In Lawrence v. Texas, the 2003 U.S. Supreme Court ruling overturning the remaining state sodomy laws, the U.S. Supreme Court further affirmed that such statutes violate the U.S. Constitution.

The former Kentucky statute criminalized consensual sexual relations between people of the same sex, even if conducted in private. Specifically, the law criminalized genital-oral (oral sex), genital-anal (anal sex), and anal-oral (rimming) sex – but only between partners of the same sex. Such sexual activities between mixed-sex (male-female) couples were legal. Such conduct was a misdemeanor punishable by up to 12 months in jail and a fine of up to $500 for same sex relationships. Solicitation of the same was also a misdemeanor, punishable by up to 90 days in jail and a fine of up to $250.

Historically, Kentucky's sodomy statutes had changed over time. The 1860 sodomy statute criminalized anal penetration by a penis and applied to both male-female couples and male-male couples. Because the law focused exclusively on penile-anal penetration, consensual sex between women was technically legal in Kentucky until 1974. In fact, in 1909, the Kentucky Supreme Court issued a ruling in Commonwealth v. Poindexter involving two African-American men arrested for consensual oral sex. In this decision, the court upheld that the then-current sodomy law did not criminalize oral sex but only anal sex.

In 1974, Kentucky revised its statutes as part of a penal code reform advocated by the American Law Institute. While the American Law Institute urged states to decriminalize consensual sodomy and other victimless crimes, the Kentucky legislature chose to decriminalize anal sex involving male-female couples but to broaden the new statute to criminalize anal-genital, oral-genital, and oral-anal sexual contact involving same-sex couples (both male-male and female-female couples). Thus, the 1974 revised statute decriminalized consensual anal sex for mixed-sex couples but expanded criminalization of sexual acts to include both male and female same-sex couples. Kentucky also reduced consensual sodomy from a felony to a misdemeanor in 1974. It was this final remaining consensual sodomy statute, which criminalized only same-sex behavior, which was ruled unconstitutional by the Kentucky Supreme Court in Kentucky v. Wasson in 1992.

== Recognition of same-sex relationships ==
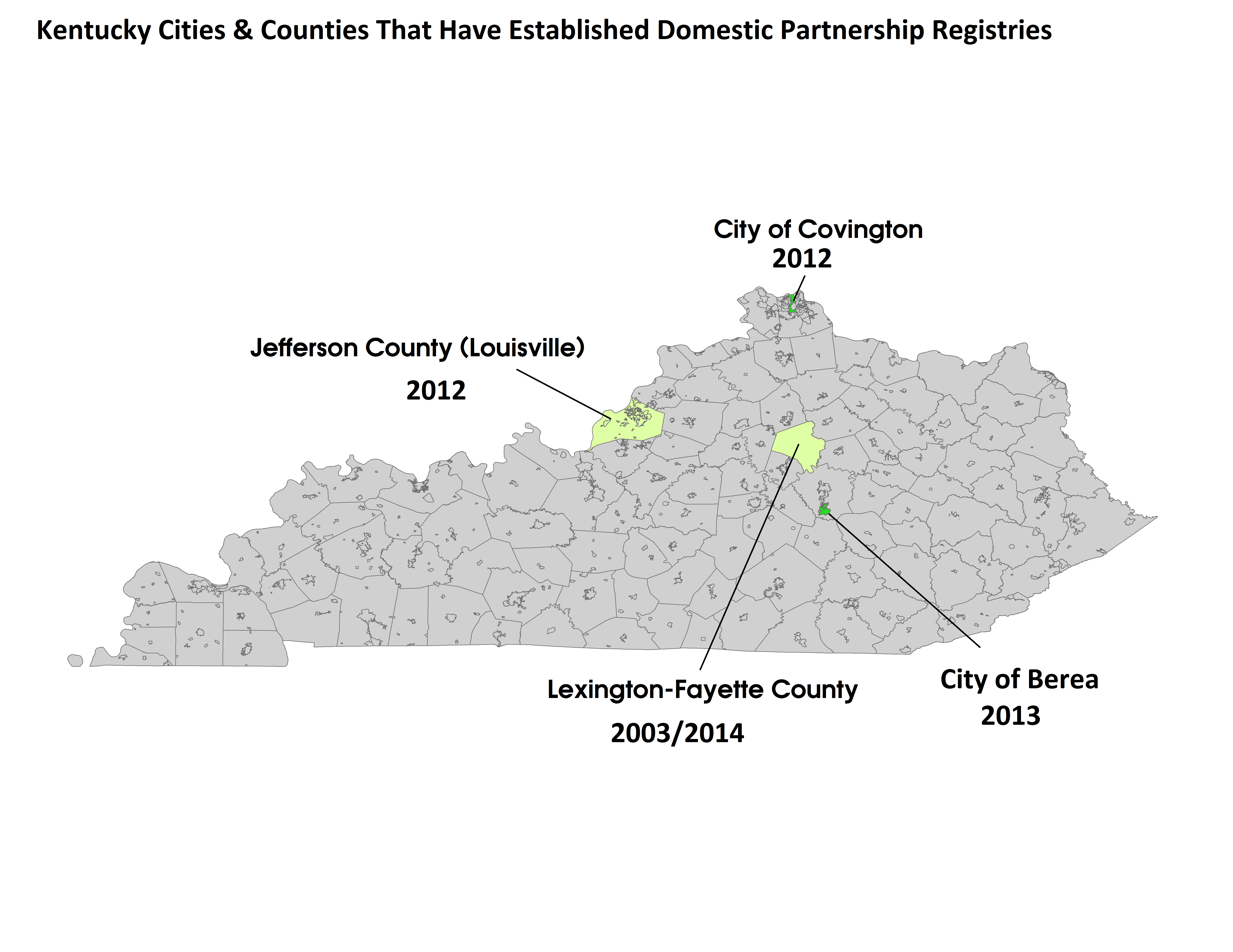
Map of Kentucky counties and cities that offer domestic partner benefits either county-wide or in particular cities. City offers domestic partner benefits County-wide partner benefits through domestic partnership County or city does not offer domestic partner benefits

On November 9, 1973, the Kentucky Court of Appeals ruled in Jones v. Hallahan that two women were properly denied a marriage license based on dictionary definitions of marriage, although state statutes do not restrict marriage to a female-male couple. Its decision said that "in substance, the relationship proposed ... is not a marriage."

Kentucky voters adopted a constitutional amendment in November 2004 that defined marriage as the union of a man and a woman and prohibited the recognition of same-sex relationships under any other name. Similar restrictions have appeared in the state statutes since July 1998 as well.

Kentucky has extended hospital visitation rights to same-sex couples through a designated visitor statute.

=== Federal lawsuits ===
Two lawsuits filed in federal court in (Bourke v. Beshear) 2013 and (Love v. Beshear) 2014 have challenged Kentucky's denial of marriage licenses to same-sex couples (Love case) as well as the state's refusal to recognize same-sex marriages established in other jurisdictions (Bourke case). The plaintiffs in the Bourke case won recognition of their marriages on February 12, 2014, and on February 14, 2014, the Love case was filed in order for couples to be allowed to marry in Kentucky. The Love was ruled on in July 2014 in the U.S. District Court in Louisville, Kentucky. On appeal, the Sixth Circuit Court of Appeals heard oral arguments on August 6, 2014. The Sixth Circuit overturned the rules in favor of the same-sex couples from Kentucky, Ohio, Tennessee, and Michigan. The cases were appealed to the U.S. Supreme Court under the Obergefell case name. On June 26, 2015, the Supreme Court ruled that all states in the U.S. were required to recognize the marriages of same-sex couples and issue marriage licenses to them.

In September 2023, a same-sex couple won $100,000 awards in damages in a court jury because Kentucky county clerk Kim Davis denied a marriage license to the couple eight years earlier.

== Adoption and parenting ==
Kentucky permits adoption by individuals or married couples only. In February 2009 Senate Bill 68 (SB 68) was introduced to the Kentucky Senate by Senator Gary Tapp (R-Waddy). If passed, SB 68 would have barred any unmarried cohabiting couples from fostering or adopting children in Kentucky. Many Kentucky fairness supporters, along with foster and adoption agencies, rallied against the bill. The Senate Judiciary Committee passed SB 68 in a hastily called, unadvertised meeting upon Senate adjournment March 5, 2009, but it died when the legislative session ended without the full Senate putting SB 68 to a vote. This was the first time a piece of anti-LGBT legislation had passed a Kentucky Senate Committee without also passing the full chamber. On January 5, 2010, House Bill 195 (HB 195) was introduced to the Kentucky House by Representative Tom Burch (D-Louisville). If passed, HB 195 would have redefined stepparent to include any non-relative adult person who the court finds as sharing parental responsibility for the child. The House Health and Welfare Committee held an informational hearing on HB 195 on March 11, 2010—the first-ever hearing of a pro-LGBT piece of legislation in the Kentucky General Assembly. HB 195 did not receive a vote but further informational hearings were requested.

== Discrimination protections ==
=== Public employment ===
Public employment discrimination against state workers based on sexual orientation or gender identity is illegal under an executive order by Governor Steve Beshear (Democrat) in June 2008. Such discrimination was originally banned by an executive order by Governor Paul Patton (Democrat) under an executive order issued by him in 2003. When Republican Governor Ernie Fletcher took office, however, he removed these protections in 2006. Thus, Beshear's order reinstates such protections.

In February 2013, Berea Mayor Steve Connelly banned discrimination based on actual or perceived sexual orientation via executive order. The order applies only to the town's 130 public employees.

=== Private employment ===
Nineteen Kentucky cities have local non-discrimination ordinances—or Fairness Ordinances—covering sexual orientation and gender identity: Lexington-Fayette County (1999), Louisville Metro (1999), Covington (2003), Frankfort (2013), Morehead (2013), Vicco (2013), Danville (2014), Midway (2015), Paducah (2018), Maysville (2018), Bellevue (2019), Dayton (2019), Georgetown (2019), Henderson (2019), Highland Heights (2019), Versailles (2019), Cold Spring (2020), Fort Thomas (2020), and Newport (2020). Henderson originally adopted a non-discrimination ordinance in 1999, but a subsequent group of city commissioners removed the protections in 2001. A similar ordinance was passed into law there in 2019.

Some of Kentucky's largest employers also ban sexual orientation discrimination through company policies and include such employers as Lexmark, the University of Kentucky, the University of Louisville, Toyota, Ford Motor Company, General Electric, PNC Financial Services, Yum! Brands and United Parcel Service.

In January 2013 Vicco, Kentucky, a town with a population of 334 as of the 2010 census, with a gay mayor, Johnny Cummings, passed a town ordinance prohibiting "discrimination in employment, housing, and public accommodations based upon a person's actual or perceived sexual orientation and gender identity". Vicco joined Covington, which enacted a similar ordinance in 2003, and Lexington and Louisville, which enacted similar ordinances in 1999. Vicco, KY was said to be the smallest town in the United States to pass such an ordinance.

=== Religious Freedom Act of 2013 ===
In March 2013, both houses of the Kentucky legislature passed the Religious Freedom Act which requires the state to show "clear and convincing evidence" for any statutes or policies that infringe on an individual's "sincerely held religious beliefs". (Note: The Religious Freedom Act reads: "Government shall not substantially burden a person's freedom of religion. The right to act or refuse to act in a manner motivated by a sincerely held religious belief may not be substantially burdened unless the government proves by clear and convincing evidence that it has a compelling governmental interest in infringing the specific act or refusal to act and has used the least restrictive means to further that interest. A 'burden' shall include indirect burdens such as withholding benefits, assessing penalties or an exclusion from programs or access to facilities.") The bill was supported by the Kentucky Family Foundation and the Kentucky Catholic Conference. More than 50 civil rights, public health, religious and other community groups urged Governor Steve Beshear to veto the legislation, including the Kentucky League of Cities, the Kentucky Association of Counties, the Kentucky ACLU and the mayors of Louisville and Covington. Opponents argued its wording was vague and could be used to override local non-discrimination ordinances. Supporters, including the bill's sponsor, Representative Bob Damron, argued it was needed to protect religious believers from state encroachment, citing the case of several Kentucky Amish who were arrested for refusing to put reflectors on their buggies when traveling government-maintained roads. Beshear vetoed the bill and the legislature overrode his veto by votes of 79–15 in the House and 32–6 in the Senate.

=== Senate Bill 17 ===
In March 2017 Kentucky Governor Matt Bevin signed into effect Senate Bill 17 (abbreviated as SB 17). This premise of this piece of legislation is to allow greater freedom of religion in public schools. Some of the main points of this law include allowing student religious organizations to use school facilities during non instructional hours, allowing students to display religious messages on clothing and allowing instructors to teach about religious holidays with the use of the Bible or other religious scriptures.

Controversy about this law stems from its implication that student religious organizations in public schools can discriminate against other students, for example, on the basis of their religious identity or sexual orientation. This conclusion is primarily drawn from the clause, "no recognized religious or political student organization is discriminated against in the ordering of its internal affairs."

Many advocates for LGBTQ rights claim that this law is anti-LGBTQ and that religious freedom is just a guise to limit the rights of LGBTQ students. Furthermore, there is also concern surrounding the fact that this law pertains to public schools, which receive federal funding and are therefore under many of its rules and limitations when it comes to public education.

=== EEOC v. R.G. & G.R. Harris Funeral Homes ===
On March 7, 2018, the United States Court of Appeals for the Sixth Circuit (covering Kentucky, Michigan, Ohio and Tennessee) ruled that Title VII of the Civil Rights Act of 1964 prohibits employment discrimination against transgender people under the category of sex. It also ruled that employers may not use the Religious Freedom Restoration Act to justify discrimination against LGBTQ people. Aimee Stephens, a transgender woman, began working for a funeral home and presented as male. In 2013, she told her boss that she was transgender and planned to transition. She was promptly fired by her boss who said that "gender transition violat[es] God’s commands because a person’s sex is an immutable God-given fit." With this decision, discrimination in the workplace based on gender identity is now banned in Kentucky.

=== 2020 Photographer marriage court ruling ===
In August 2020, a district court judge appointed by Trump allowed a photographer within Kentucky to refuse taking pictures of a same-sex marriage - due to an individual's held religious affiliation and beliefs.

In his ruling, the judge wrote that “Christian” photographer Chelsey Walker cannot be compelled to take photos of same-sex weddings, even though she offers her photography as a public business, because her photos are “art” and art is a form of “speech.” Therefore, no government can force people to make any speech against their will. The judge said that requiring her to take photos of gay weddings would also go against Walker's religious beliefs.

== Hate crime law ==
Kentucky statutes cover hate crimes based on sexual orientation but not gender identity.

On March 15, 2012, the Kentucky State Police assisted the FBI in arresting David Jenkins, Anthony Jenkins, Mable Jenkins, and Alexis Jenkins of Partridge for the beating of Kevin Pennington during a late-night attack in April 2011 at Kingdom Come State Park, near Cumberland. The push came from the gay rights group Kentucky Equality Federation, whose president, Jordan Palmer, began lobbying the U.S. Attorney for the Eastern District of Kentucky in August 2011 to prosecute after stating he had no confidence in the Harlan County Commonwealth's Attorney to act. "I think the case's notoriety may have derived in large part from the Kentucky Equality Federation efforts," said Harvey, the U.S. Attorney for the Eastern District of Kentucky. Mable Jenkins and Alexis Jenkins pleaded guilty.

== Transgender rights ==
Kentucky permits post-operative transgender people to amend their sex on their birth certificates. A letter from the doctor stating that gender affirming surgery has been performed can be sent directly to the Department of Vital Statistics in Frankfort, prior to this, a Court Order was required for the gender change for a Kentucky born person.

Minors cannot receive gender-affirming care as of July 14, 2023. There is no phaseout period for those already receiving such care. On September 28, 2023, federal appeals judges allowed the ban to remain in effect while legal challenges to overturn it are pending.

=== Sports ===
In March 2022, the Kentucky General Assembly passed a bill (SB83) to ban transgender athletes from female sports teams. The Governor of Kentucky Andy Beshear vetoed the bill a month later in April 2022, due to "constitutionality and legal vagueness concerns". In the same month, the Kentucky General Assembly overrode the veto, and the law went into effect immediately.

=== House Bill 470 ===
In February 2023, Republican state legislators introduced House Bill 470, which would do the following:

- Ban gender affirming healthcare for trans minors
- Ban public funding for any entity that provides or assists in the providing gender affirming healthcare to trans youth, including pharmaceutical companies, even if it is only provided out of state
- Ban medical professionals and therapists from encouraging or advocating for the use of a name, pronouns, clothing, or behavior not typically associated with their assigned gender by a trans minor.
- Bans the state from making Medicaid contracts with insurance companies that cover gender affirming healthcare for trans youth, even if only out of state
- Mandate reporting by school employees of any deviation by a minor in expression from their assigned gender.
- Ban legal document changes for trans youth, including name changes.
- Strip liability protections from doctors that previously provided gender affirming healthcare to trans youth, and allow them to be sued up to 30 years later for such.
- Mandate any doctor or therapist reported to be encouraging such aforementioned deviation be investigated by the state.
- Define sex for the purposes of law as solely one’s assigned sex at birth.

A Mason-Dixon poll found that 71% of Kentuckians opposed the bill, while 21% were in favor, and 8% undecided.

On March 2, 2023, the state House judiciary committee advanced the bill. Within hours, the full House passed the bill, sending it on to the state senate. Protests simultaneously took place both inside and outside the state capitol, with chanting audible while the House passed the bill. On March 17, 2023, the legislature passed a version of an anti-transgender bill that included the ban on gender-affirming care for minors. The Governor of Kentucky vetoed the bill. The Legislature has the power to override the veto with just a formal "simple majority vote" in each house. On March 29, the GOP-led legislature overrode the veto, while protests took place in the gallery. Once the veto was overrode and the bill passed into law, police arrested 19 protesters and charged them with criminal trespassing.

== Conversion therapy ==
Conversion therapy on minors is illegal in Kentucky since September 18, 2024, when Governor Beshear signed an executive order.

Several cities in Kentucky had previously banned it: the first was Covington in March 2020 (by a vote of 5–0), the second was Louisville in September 2020 (by a vote of 24–1), and the third was Lexington in May 2021 (by a unanimous vote by the Lexington-Fayette Urban County Council).

== See also ==
- Same-sex marriage in Kentucky
