= Kentucky Senate Bill 83 =

2022 Kentucky law

Kentucky General Assembly
- Long title: AN ACT relating to athletics.
- Territorial extent: Kentucky
- Enacted by: Kentucky Senate
- Enacted by: Kentucky House of Representatives
- Vetoed by: Andy Beshear
- Vetoed: April 6, 2022
- Veto overridden: April 16, 2022
- Effective: July 14, 2022

Legislative history

Initiating chamber: Kentucky Senate
- Introduced by: Robby Mills
- Introduced: January 11, 2022
- First reading: February 10, 2022
- Second reading: February 11, 2022
- Third reading: February 16, 2022
- Voting summary: 27 voted for; 8 voted against; 3 absent

Revising chamber: Kentucky House of Representatives
- Received from the Kentucky Senate: February 17, 2022
- First reading: March 10, 2022
- Second reading: March 11, 2022
- Third reading: March 17, 2022
- Voting summary: 70 voted for; 23 voted against; 7 absent

Final stages
- Reconsidered by the Kentucky Senate after veto: April 13, 2022
- Voting summary: 29 voted for; 8 voted against; 1 absent
- Reconsidered by the Kentucky House of Representatives after veto: April 13, 2022
- Voting summary: 72 voted for; 23 voted against; 5 absent

Summary
- Bans transgender Kentuckians, specifically those assigned male at birth, from competing in girls' sports.
- Status: In force

Kentucky Senate Bill 83 (SB 83), also known as the Save Women's Sports Act or Fairness in Women's Sports Act, is a 2022 law in the state of Kentucky that prohibits transgender women from competing in women's sports. It was vetoed by Governor Andy Beshear on April 6, 2022, but was overridden on April 13, 2022. It became law on July 14, 2022.

The bill specifically targets transgender women and girls. Senate Bill 83 allows anybody regardless of sex or gender to compete in male or coed sports, but prohibits those assigned male at birth from competing in girls' sports. The Kentucky High School Athletic Association already had regulations on transgender athlete competition prior to Senate Bill 83, requiring a certain amount of time on hormone replacement therapy prior to being allowed to compete. Only one transgender girl, Fischer Wells, is known to have been competing in girls' sports in Kentucky at the time SB 83 passed.

== Provisions ==
Senate Bill 83 prohibits anybody assigned male at birth from competing in girls' sports. It applies to both K-12 schools and colleges in Kentucky. It specifically determines eligibility based on birth certificates.

== Reactions ==
=== Support ===
Riley Gaines, a professional swimmer, supported Senate Bill 83 when it was under debate, stating that there were biological differences between those assigned male or female at birth that could not be ignored.

=== Opposition ===
The Human Rights Campaign and the ACLU of Kentucky opposed SB 83.

== See also ==
- LGBTQ rights in Kentucky
