= Tim Feeley =

American politician

Deputy Secretary of the Kentucky Cabinet for Health and Family Services
- In office January 2016 – January 2019
- Governor: Matt Bevin

Family Court Judge for Kentucky Circuit Court 12
- In office March 2005 – January 2016

Member of the Kentucky House of Representatives from the 59th district
- In office January 1, 1999 – March 2005
- Preceded by: James Zimmerman
- Succeeded by: David W. Osborne

Personal details
- Born: 3 February 1956 (age 70)
- Party: Republican

Timothy E. Feeley (born February 3, 1956) is an American politician from Kentucky who was a member of the Kentucky House of Representatives from 1999 to 2005. Feeley was first elected in 1998 after incumbent representative James Zimmerman retired. He resigned from the house in 2005 after being appointed to be a family court judge by governor Ernie Fletcher. He left the court in 2016 in order to join the administration of governor Matt Bevin.
