= Fairness Campaign =

U.S. nonprofit organization

- U.S. State of Kentucky
- Founded: 1991
- Type: 501(c)(4)
- Tax ID no.: 61-1230384
- Location: Louisville, Kentucky
- Region served: Kentucky
- Key people: Chris Hartman, director
- Website: fairness.org

The Fairness Campaign is a Louisville, Kentucky–based lobbying and advocacy organization, focusing primarily on preventing discrimination on the basis of sexual orientation and gender identity. The Fairness Campaign is recognized by the IRS as a 501(c)(4) organization. The organization is a member of the Equality Federation.

== Founding ==
In 1981, Sam Dorr, a branch manager at Louisville's First National Bank, was fired from his job because he was gay. The incident, and Dorr's subsequent lawsuit, led many of Louisville's homosexual men and women to form Gays and Lesbians United for Equality (GLUE) to educate the public and raise awareness for gay rights issues. GLUE's focus on education and awareness left many in Louisville's gay community calling for a more overtly political organization to advance their interests.

In 1983, a small grassroots group was formed, the Greater Louisville Human Rights Coalition (GLHRC). The GLHRC filled the political void of GLUE, and began their efforts by pressuring Louisville officials to address discrimination in the areas of housing, employment, and public accommodations. Those efforts led to Louisville's first-ever gay rights march, the March for Justice, in which about 300 people marched to the steps of the Jefferson County courthouse in June 1987.

Public attention returned to discrimination issues in 1990, when a highly publicized hate crime incident led to the introduction, before the Louisville Board of Aldermen, of a local Hate Crimes Ordinance. The anti-hate crimes ordinance covered race, religion, ethnicity, and sexual orientation. When a final version passed the Board of Aldermen in November 1991, it became the first piece of legislation in Kentucky to provide protection on the basis of sexual orientation.

The Fairness Campaign emerged in 1991 as an outgrowth of GLUE, GLHRC, the Kentucky Rainbow Coalition, and the Kentucky Alliance Against Racist and Political Oppression. The Fairness Campaign was announced at the 1991 March for Justice. An early spokesman for the Fairness Campaign has said that the name "Fairness" was chosen in part for its rhetorical value. "Fairness means stopping discrimination, and all discrimination is wrong."

The Fairness Campaign celebrated its 20th anniversary in 2011. U.S. Representative John Yarmuth (KY-3) commemorated the anniversary with a speech from House floor.

=== Kentucky Fairness Alliance ===
The Kentucky Fairness Alliance (KFA) was an American gay rights organization formed in 1993 and based in Kentucky. In 2013, KFA merged its assets under the auspices of the Louisville-based Fairness Campaign. KFA provided public education and advocacy on issues affecting lesbian, gay, bisexual, and transgender (LGBT+) individuals and families in Kentucky.

Because of its role as an advocate for LGBT+ Kentuckians, the history of the Kentucky Fairness Alliance mirrors the legal and legislative issues affecting gay rights in Kentucky since the early 1990s. In 1993 a group of LGBT+ Kentuckians from across the Commonwealth, but principally from Louisville and Central Kentucky, formed the Kentucky Fairness Alliance Education Fund with the expressed purpose of educating the public on LGBT+ issues.

The organization's founders included Carla Wallace and Pam McMichael of Louisville; Pam Goldman and Keith Elston of Lexington; Barry Grossheim of Northern Kentucky; the Rev. Ben Guess of Henderson; and other activists from around the state. Many in this group came to the Kentucky Fairness Alliance from their involvement in groups like Louisville's Fairness Campaign and Lexington's Gay and Lesbian Service Organization. The group's formation was in part a response to attempts in the Kentucky General Assembly to recriminalize consensual sodomy after the Kentucky Supreme Court, in Kentucky v. Wasson overturned a statute making consensual oral or anal sex between members of the same sex illegal while allowing these sex acts between members of the opposite sex.

== Initiatives ==
=== Louisville Fairness Ordinance ===
The first goal of the Fairness Campaign was securing a civil rights ordinance in Louisville that extended protection from discrimination to include sexual orientation and gender identity. The Fairness Campaign and its political action committee, Committee for Fairness and Individual Rights (C-FAIR), persuaded the Board of Aldermen to introduce such an ordinance on November 12, 1991. The proposed ordinance, referred to as the Fairness Amendment, extended broad protections, preventing discrimination on the basis of sexual orientation and gender identity in the areas of employment, housing, and public accommodations.

While the Fairness Amendment had strong initial public support, opposition from conservative groups, including the Louisville mega-church Southeast Christian, soon mounted. When a key supporter on the Board of Aldermen, Paul Bather, withdrew his support, the ordinance stalled. Despite pressure from the Fairness Campaign and C-FAIR, the ordinance failed again in 1992. A pared-down version, preventing discrimination only in employment, also failed in a 1995 vote. The broad ordinance was voted down again in 1997.

In 1998, a daycare employee named Alicia Pedreira was fired from her job because she was a lesbian. Like the Dorr incident in 1981, this firing drew attention to the issue of workplace discrimination, and directly countered claims by opponents of the ordinance that such discrimination did not occur in Louisville.

In early January 1999, the Fairness Campaign proposed three separate ordinances—one addressing employment discrimination, the second addressing housing discrimination, and the third addressing public accommodations discrimination. The Board of Aldermen took up the employment ordinance first, separate from the other two ordinances and against the backdrop of the Pedreira incident. When Alderman President Steve Magre switched his no-vote after hearing citizen's accounts of workplace discrimination, passage was all but assured. The employment discrimination ordinance passed the Board of Aldermen on January 26, 1999, making it the first piece of legislation to protect people on the basis of sexual orientation or gender identity to be passed in Kentucky.

=== Jefferson County Fairness Ordinance ===
When passage of the Louisville ordinance became clearer, the Fairness Campaign pushed for passage of a broader fairness ordinance for Jefferson County, which included not only Louisville, but also a large area surrounding Louisville. The proposed county ordinance covered housing and public accommodations, as well as employment.

The ordinance had the support of two of the three Jefferson County Commissioners, and was opposed by County Judge Executive Rebecca Jackson, who would also cast a vote on the proposed ordinance. The third commissioner, Joe Corradino, ultimately decided to support the ordinance, and it passed on October 12, 1999. Corradino lost his campaign for re-election less than a month later, as conservative voters, angry over his decisive vote, mobilized to oppose him.

=== Louisville Metro Fairness Ordinance ===
The Louisville Metro Government was created when voters approved a merger between the City of Louisville and Jefferson County. The new legislative branch of Louisville Metro, the Metro Council, had a five-year limit to adopt or amend the old ordinances of the two defunct governments. Both fairness ordinances would have therefore expired in 2007 had the Metro Council not acted.

Facing a new opportunity to defeat the ordinances, many of the same opposition forces mobilized to lobby Metro Council members to vote against adoption. The opposition campaign doubled down, producing inflammatory television commercials and sending out provocative and vulgar mass mailings. The Metro Council ultimately voted to adopt a broad fairness ordinance—protecting against discrimination in employment, housing, and public accommodations—in a bipartisan vote of 19–6. Some Council members attributed their votes for the ordinance to the nasty opposition campaign.

Mayor Jerry Abramson signed the ordinance into law on December 10, 2004.

=== Other Kentucky cities with LGBT fairness ordinances ===
The Fairness Campaign has also had a hand in passing ordinances similar to the one in Louisville in the Kentucky cities of Lexington, Covington, and Henderson. The Henderson ordinance, which passed in 1999, was repealed 18 months later by officials who campaigned on their promise to repeal.

More recently, the Fairness Campaign and the statewide Fairness Coalition worked with officials in the towns of Midway, Danville, Morehead, Frankfort, and the small town of Vicco to pass an anti-discrimination ordinance. Fairness assisted in the drafting and implementation of this measure. In banning discrimination on the basis of sexual orientation or gender identity Vicco became the smallest town in Kentucky and the United States to pass such an ordinance.

=== 2004 Kentucky Marriage Amendment ===
The Fairness Campaign actively opposed the proposed 2004 amendment to the Kentucky Constitution defining marriage as between one man and one woman. The Fairness Campaign's Fairness Education Fund paid for billboard signage and thousands of postcard mailings to voters. The Fairness Campaign spent $17,000 opposing the amendment. Opposition groups spent almost $523,000 trying to defeat the measure.

The amendment ultimately passed with 75% support. Kentucky was one of eleven states to pass similar measures prohibiting same-sex marriage in 2004 as part of a massive conservative mobilization effort on the issue.

=== Statewide legislation ===
The Fairness Campaign promotes statewide legislation that provides protection against discrimination on the basis of sexual orientation or gender identity. The 2014 Kentucky General Assembly saw a record number of co-sponsors on both the House and Senate versions of the Statewide Fairness legislation—18 co-sponsors in the House, up from the previous record 10 and six co-sponsors in the Senate, up from five. In one of the largest endorsements of the Statewide Fairness legislation to date, Speaker of the House Greg Stumbo (Prestonsburg) signed on to the House bill for the first time in 2014. Weeks later, the Statewide Fairness legislation, led by Representative Mary Lou Marzian (Louisville), received its first-ever hearing in the House Judiciary Committee under the leadership of Chairman John Tilley (Hopkinsville). Though no vote was taken, Chairman Tilley expressed personal support and suggested the committee would take the issue up again.

=== Debates ===
Fairness Campaign leaders have met opposition to LGBT rights in a number of public debates, most notably on Kentucky Education Television's public affairs program, Kentucky Tonight, hosted by Bill Goodman. Kentucky Tonight held a debate on anti-LGBT adoption legislation in 2009, LGBT marriage in 2012, the Federal Employment Non-Discrimination Act in 2013, Statewide Fairness legislation and LGBT marriage again in 2014, following federal court rulings striking down LGBT marriage bans in Kentucky.

=== Annual Gay & Lesbian Film Series ===
Kentucky Fairness Alliance held the 1st Annual Gay & Lesbian Film Series Kickoff Gala on May 30, 2008, in Louisville. The Human Rights Campaign was among the many sponsors of the event supporting Kentucky Fairness Alliance.

== Controversy ==
In August 2011, the Fairness Campaign condemned threatening statements made on Facebook by then-treasurer of C-FAIR, Anthony Casebeer. Casebeer made these statements in response to a paper co-written by lesbian activist Cathy Brennan, which proposed that extension of transgender rights could curtail the rights of women. A posting on Casebeer's Facebook page said that a "nice home run swing to the head with a 38-oz. Louisville Slugger is more in order," and that if the poster "ever saw [Brennan] in my windshield, I'll be wiping blood off my white Buick. But I won't be using the brakes." Casebeer later apologized to Brennan and resigned from his post at C-FAIR.

In March 2012, after a bill supported by the Fairness Campaign to protect students from bullying died in committee, director Chris Hartman confronted a lobbyist for the conservative opposition group in the hallway of the Capitol Annex in Frankfort. A spokesman for the conservative Kentucky Family Foundation alleged that Hartman was harassing the lobbyist and using abusive language. Hartman has said that he asked the lobbyist "What would Jesus do?" and was frustrated when the lobbyist would not respond to his questions. Hartman noted that the incident took place in front of the press and the Capitol police, and that the spokesman from the Family Foundation was the only person to see an issue.

On March 23, 2013, Hartman's car was vandalized with a swastika. Hartman called the police to report that his car had been sideswiped while parked on the street, but when officers responded to the scene they noticed a swastika had been drawn on a Fairness Campaign sticker and that two Obama campaign stickers had also been defaced. Louisville Metro Police investigated the incident as a hate crime.

== See also ==
- LGBT rights in the United States
  - LGBT rights in Kentucky
- List of LGBT rights organizations
- History of Louisville, Kentucky
