= James Zimmerman (politician) =

American politician

Member of the Kentucky House of Representatives from the 59th district
- In office January 1, 1989 – January 1, 1999
- Preceded by: Bob Jones
- Succeeded by: Tim Feeley

Personal details
- Born: 20 May 1946 (age 80)
- Party: Republican

James Floyd Zimmerman (born May 20, 1946) is an American politician from Kentucky who was a member of the Kentucky House of Representatives from 1989 to 1999. Zimmerman was first elected in 1988, defeating incumbent Democratic representative Bob Jones for reelection. He did not seek reelection in 1998.
