= USS David R. Ray =

Spruance-class destroyer

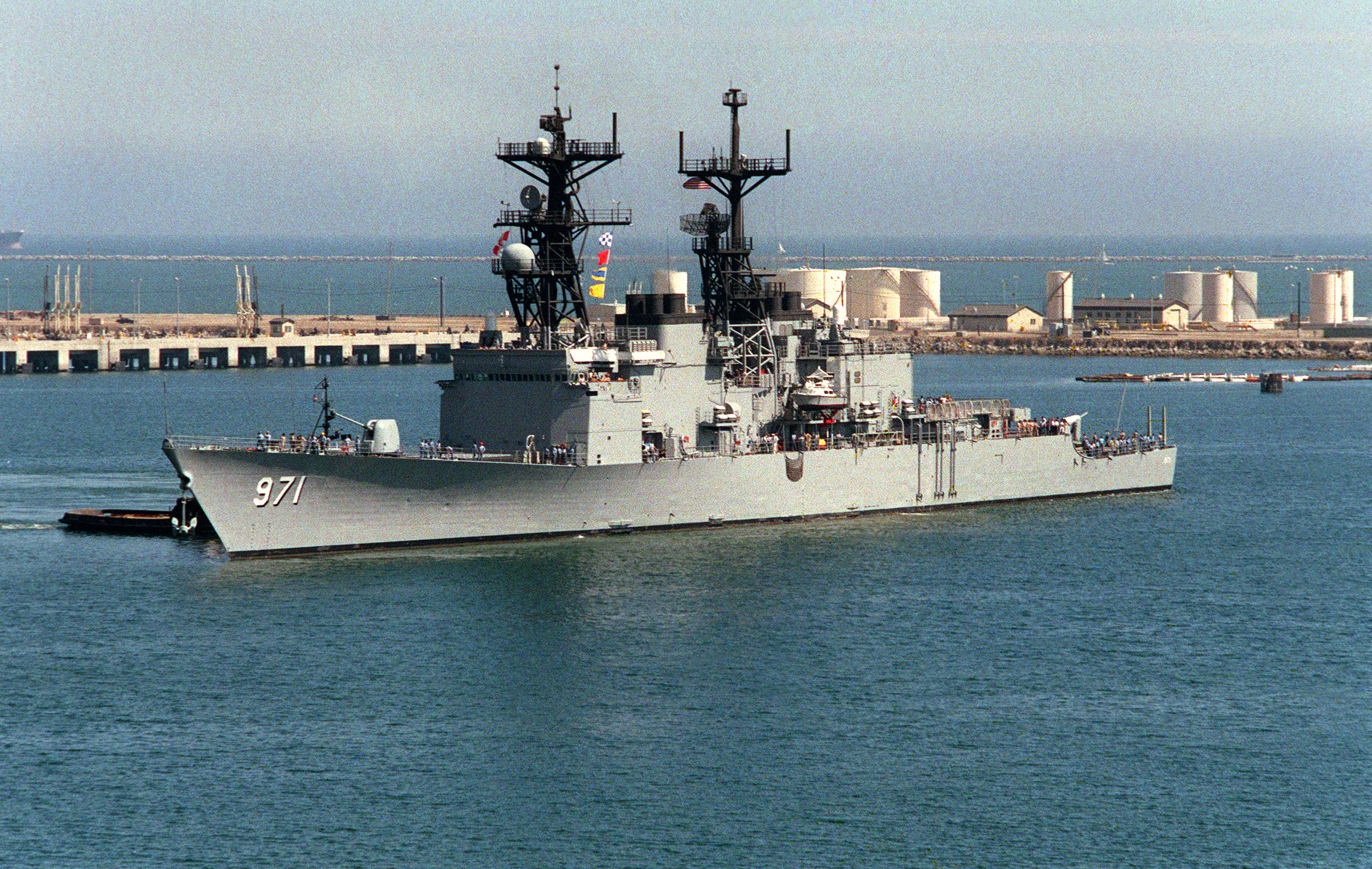
- USS David R. Ray on 27 June 1989

History

United States
- Name: David R. Ray
- Namesake: David R. Ray
- Ordered: 15 January 1971
- Builder: Ingalls Shipbuilding
- Laid down: 23 September 1974
- Launched: 23 August 1975
- Acquired: 31 October 1977
- Commissioned: 19 November 1977
- Decommissioned: 28 February 2002
- Stricken: 6 November 2002
- Identification: Callsign: NBDQ; Hull number: DD-971
- Motto: Determined, Ready, Resourceful
- Fate: Sunk as target, 11 July 2008
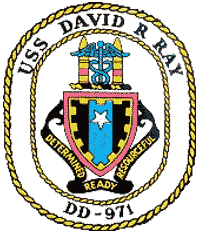
- Badge

General characteristics
- Class & type: Spruance-class destroyer
- Displacement: 8,040 long tons (8,170 t) full load
- Length: 529 ft (161 m) waterline; 563 ft (172 m) overall
- Beam: 55 ft (17 m)
- Draft: 29 ft (8.8 m)
- Installed power: 3 × 501-K17 generator sets (2,000 kW (2,700 hp) each)
- Propulsion: 4 × General Electric LM2500 gas turbines, 2 shafts, 80,000 shp (60 MW)
- Speed: 32.5 knots (60.2 km/h; 37.4 mph)
- Range: 6,000 nmi (11,000 km; 6,900 mi) at 20 knots (37 km/h; 23 mph)
- Complement: 19 officers, 315 enlisted
- Sensors & processing systems: AN/SPS-40 air search radar; AN/SPG-60 fire control radar; AN/SPS-55 surface search radar; AN/SPQ-9 gun fire control radar; Mark 23 TAS automatic detection and tracking radar; AN/SPS-65 missile fire control radar; AN/SQS-53 bow-mounted active sonar; AN/SQR-19 TACTAS towed array passive sonar; Naval Tactical Data System
- Electronic warfare & decoys: AN/SLQ-32 electronic warfare system; AN/SLQ-25 Nixie torpedo countermeasures; Mark 36 SRBOC decoy launching system; AN/SLQ-49 inflatable decoys
- Armament: 2 × 5 in (127 mm) 54 caliber Mark 45 dual purpose guns; 2 × 20 mm Phalanx CIWS Mark 15 guns; 1 × 8 cell ASROC launcher (removed); 1 × 8 cell NATO Sea Sparrow Mark 29 missile launcher; 2 × quadruple Harpoon missile canisters; 2 × Mark 32 triple 12.75 in (324 mm) torpedo tubes (Mk 46 torpedoes); 1 × 61 cell Mk 41 VLS launcher for Tomahawk missiles; 1 × 21 round RIM-116 Rolling Airframe Missile (removed 1980s); 2 × SH-2F or 2 × SH-60B
- Aircraft carried: 2 × Sikorsky SH-60 Seahawk LAMPS III helicopters
- Aviation facilities: Flight deck and enclosed hangar for up to two medium-lift helicopters

USS David R. Ray (DD-971), was a Spruance-class destroyer named for United States Navy Hospital Corpsman Second Class David Robert Ray who was killed in action in 1969 while assigned to a Marine Corps artillery unit during the Vietnam War and posthumously awarded the Medal of Honor.

The David R. Ray was built by the Ingalls Shipbuilding Division of Litton Industries at Pascagoula, Mississippi, and commissioned on November 19, 1977, in Pascagoula. The principal speaker at the event was James R. Sasser, U.S. Senator from Tennessee and the ships sponsor was Mrs. Donnie M. Ray, HM2 Ray's mother. The David R. Ray was decommissioned in 2002 and sunk as a target in 2008.

== Ship's history ==
On the voyage from Pascagoula to her new homeport of San Diego, the David R. Ray passed through the Panama Canal. David R. Ray, nicknamed "Sting Ray", crossed the equator for the first time on 16 May 1978. On 19 February 1979, she became the first ship to intercept a supersonic drone with the NATO RIM-7 Seasparrow Missile System. The ship first deployed on 8 September 1979 and made port calls in Pearl Harbor, Guam, Yokosuka, Inchon, Subic Bay, and Hong Kong. In 1982, David R. Ray went through her first major overhaul in Seattle, Washington. On 18 October 1983, David R. Ray began another "WESTPAC" to the Western Pacific and Indian Ocean. After port visits to Pearl Harbor, Subic Bay, Pusan, Chinhae, Hong Kong and Pattaya, the ship participated in a joint Thailand-U.S. naval exercise. Later, the Ray spent 54 continuous days underway, spanning from the northwest Indian Ocean to northernmost Sea of Japan following and performing surveillance operations (SURVOPS) on the newest Soviet carrier, "Novorossiysk".

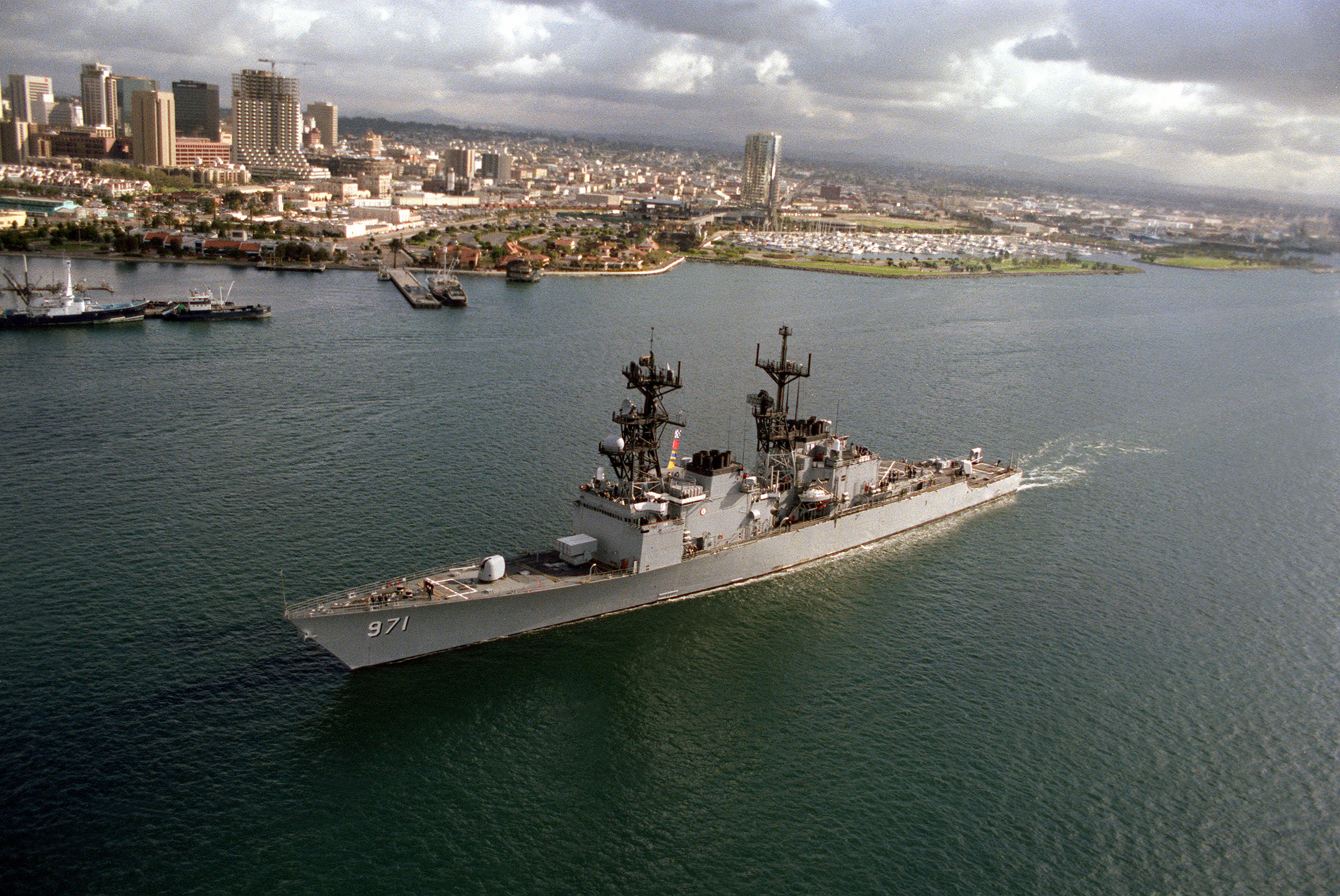
David R. Ray with RAM launcher aft.

Late in 1984, David R. Ray became the Navy's primary test platform for the Rolling Airframe Missile (RAM) System. On 15 January 1986, David R. Ray deployed with Battle Group Foxtrot. During this deployment, the ship made worldwide news when it prevented the boarding of the U.S. Vessel President McKinley by an Iranian Saam class frigate on 12 May 1986.

David R. Ray's second major overhaul began in June 1988, which coincided with the ship's shift of homeport from San Diego to Long Beach, California. During this overhaul, the ship received a Vertical Launch System. After the overhaul, the ship completed four CNO projects, including RAM, NATO Seasparrow RIM-7P, BGM-109 Tomahawk Block 2 and ASROC. David R. Ray deployed on 27 April 1990 and was in the Persian Gulf at the onset of Iraq's invasion of Kuwait. The ship played a critical role in the early stages of Operation Desert Shield before returning to the United States. Deploying again to the Middle East Force on 22 April 1992, the ship served as flagship during Maritime Interception Force Operations before returning to Long Beach, California, on 22 October 1992.

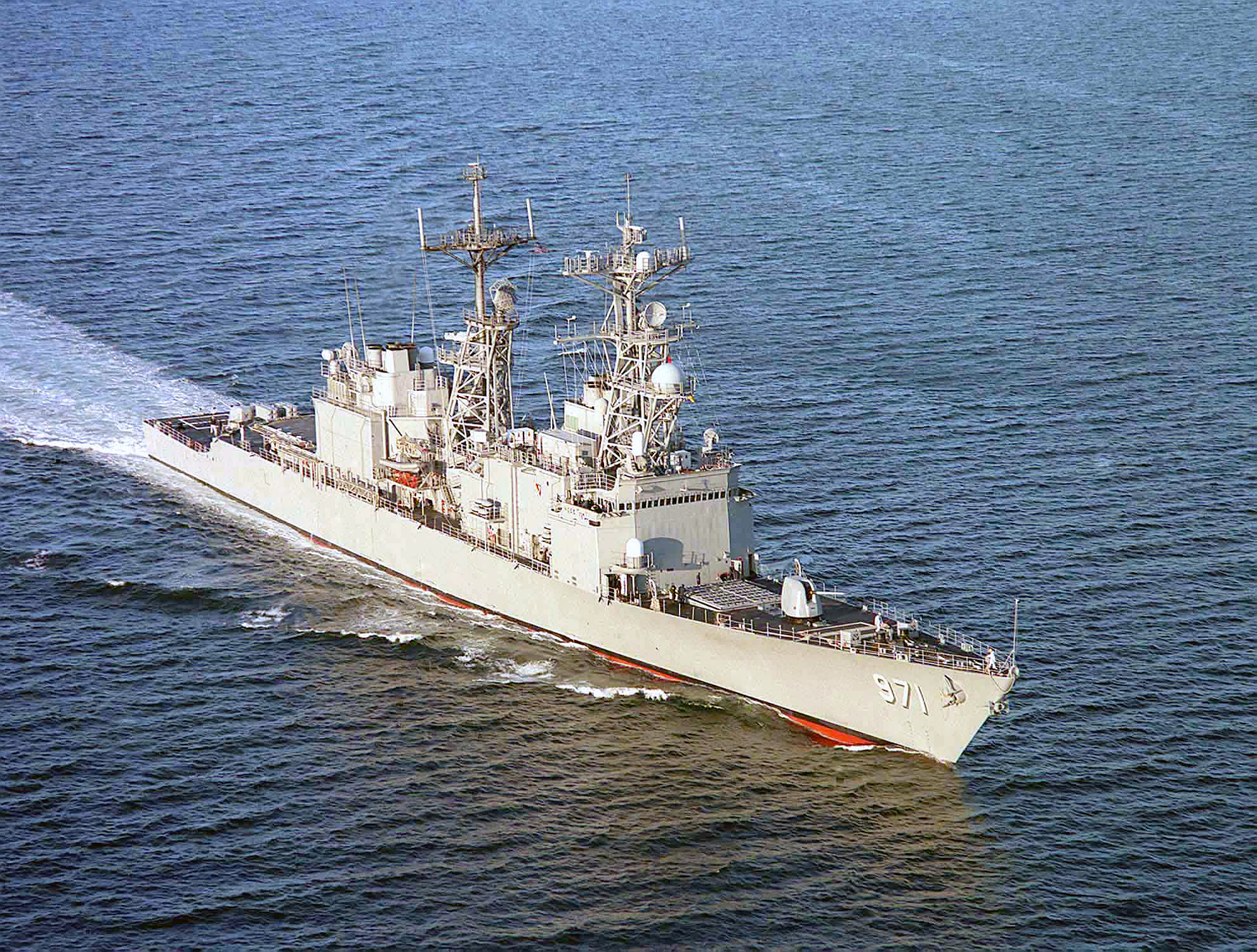
David R. Ray with VLS.

David R. Ray deployed to the Persian Gulf in October 1994 and served as flagship to Commander, Destroyer Squadron Fifty conducting Maritime Interception Operations in boarding numerous suspect vessels resulting in the diversion and detention of three vessels. Upon return from deployment in April 1995, the ship continued a very fast operational tempo, including trips to Catalina Island, Seattle Sea Fair, and San Francisco Fleet Week.

David R. Ray completed a nine-month regular overhaul at Long Beach Naval Shipyard in June 1996 and then a homeport change to Everett, Washington, in July 1996. The ship completed a full workup cycle before deploying on 20 May 1997 to the Western Pacific and Persian Gulf as senior ship of a Middle East Force / Surface Action Group. During this deployment, the ship conducted 49 boardings and over 700 flight hours in support of Maritime Interception Operations. Upon return in November 1997, the ship went into holiday stand down and commenced a nine-week maintenance availability on 11 February 1998 which ended 15 April 1998. David R. Ray spent the remainder of 1998 preparing for its next deployment. On 9 March 1999, David R. Ray received no notice tasking to act as the Surface Action Group Commander for the sinking of the M/V New Carissa off the coast of Oregon. The ship's quick response and control of the elements of the Surface Action Group averted a potentially disastrous oil spill. The ship and her crew earned the Coast Guard Unit Commendation with Operational Device for its participation in this effort.

On 16 April 1999 the David R. Ray deployed to the Persian Gulf on PACMEF 99–2 as the Surface Action Group Commander. The ship and crew conducted 55 boardings and over 850 hours of flight operations. David R. Ray was again in the news when her crew helped to delivery a healthy baby girl on aboard an Iraqi ferry. The ship returned to its homeport on 4 October 1999. Since returning from deployment, David R. Ray participated in various training opportunities, including Anti-Air Warfare and Naval Surface Fire Support exercises. Prior to the ship's change of command on 29 April 2000, David R. Ray visited Puerto Vallarta and escorted the ex-USS South Carolina (CGN-37) as she was towed to Bremerton, Washington, for deactivation and nuclear-powered vessel recycling.

In May 2001 the "David R. Ray" deployed on her final assignment to the Caribbean and Eastern Pacific on a Counter Narcotic Deployment, returning to its home port in October 2001.

On 28 February 2002, USS David R. Ray was decommissioned and spent its remaining years anchored in Sinclair Inlet off Highway 303 in Bremerton, Washington. On 17 June 2008, the ex-USS David R. Ray was towed by fleet tug to Pearl Harbor, Hawaii, where she was to be sunk as a target as part of the annual RIMPAC exercises. ex-David R. Ray was sunk during RIMPAC 2008 on 11 July 2008 by fire from eight U.S. and Japanese ships along with three aircraft using naval artillery and Harpoon missiles. ex-David R. Ray sank after sunset that night.

== Awards ==
- Navy Unit Commendation - (Oct 1997-Apr 1998)
- Navy Meritorious Unit Commendation - (Nov 1979-Feb 1980, Jan-Aug 1986, May-Sep 1992)
- Battle "E" - (1981)
- Navy Expeditionary Medal - (Nov 1979-Feb 1980, May-Sep 1981, Oct 1981)
- Southwest Asia Service Medal - (Au-Sep 1990)
- Humanitarian Service Medal - (9 Oct 1980)

== In popular culture ==
The destroyer is a secondary setting for the 45th installment of the Bande dessinée series Buck Danny, Les secrets de la Mer Noire, set during the early 1990s, where the hero's sidekicks Jerry Tumbler and Sonny Tuckson are on board on a mission of distant support for Buck Danny, himself on a PR mission on the soviet carrier Admiral Kuznetsov.

== Ship's crest ==
The coat of arms of David R. Ray serves as a heraldic reminder of the ship's namesake. The light blue center section and white inverted star allude to the Medal of Honor pendant. The light blue and two Navy blue stripes represent the courage, perseverance and selfless devotion of Petty Officer Ray in the performance of his duties as corpsman with Battery D, Second Battalion, Eleventh Marine Regiment, First Marine Division (Reinforced), Fleet Marine Force, in South Vietnam. The battery's position is indicated by the scarlet and gold embattled border.

Navy blue, gold and scarlet are the colors of the Navy and Marine Corps. The navy blue caduceus is the insignia worn by hospital corpsmen in the U.S. Navy. The artillery howitzer cartridges allude to the medical services the Navy provides to Marine Corps artillery units, in particular, the action in which Petty Officer Ray, though fatally wounded, gave medical assistance and protection to wounded Marine comrades. The ship's motto, "Determined, Ready, Resourceful" alludes to the initials of Petty Officer Ray and epitomizes his legacy to the ship that bears his name. The motto served as a guide and inspiration for the men and women who served on the David R. Ray throughout the years.

== Gallery ==
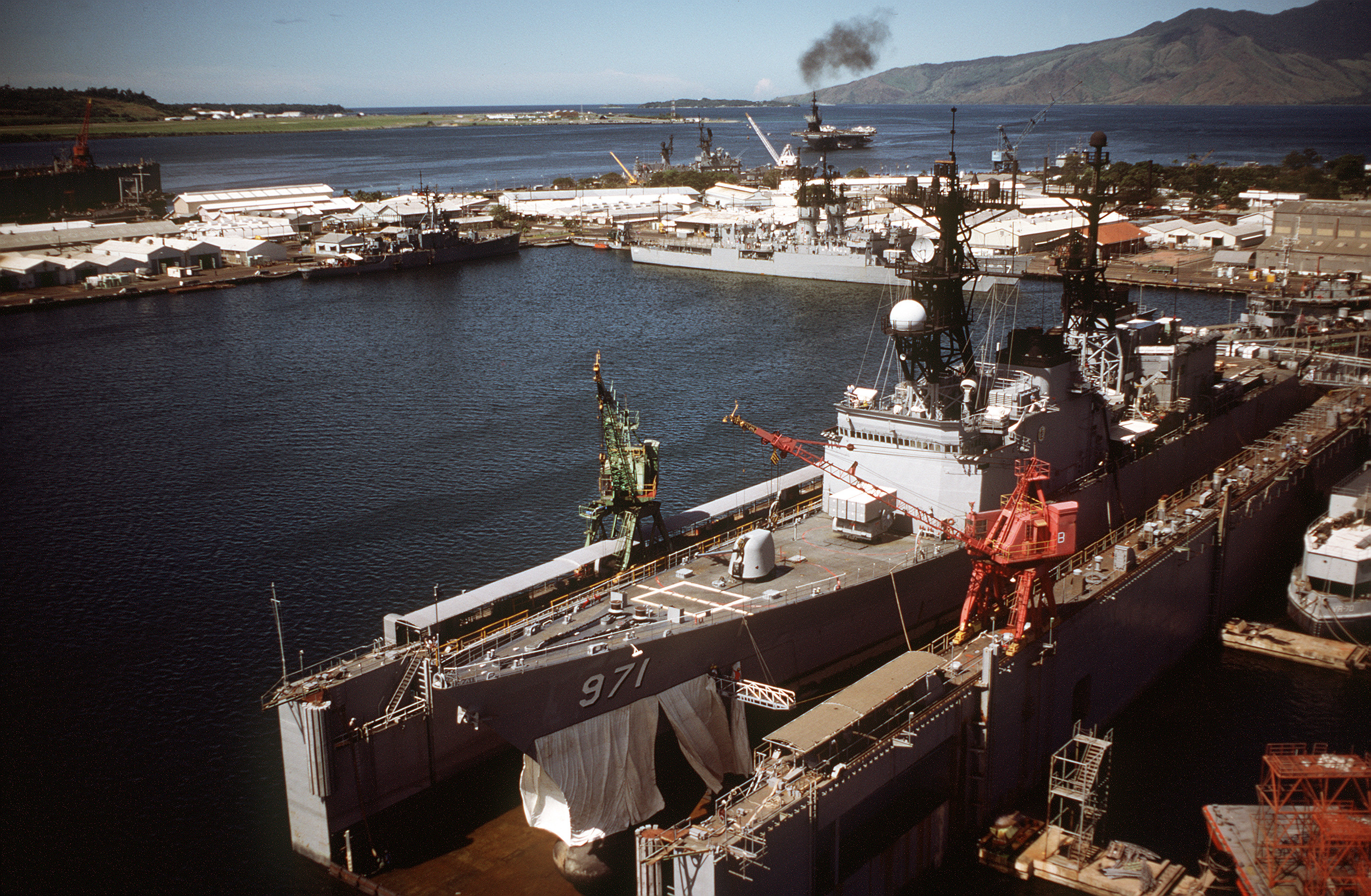
USS David R. Ray in 1982

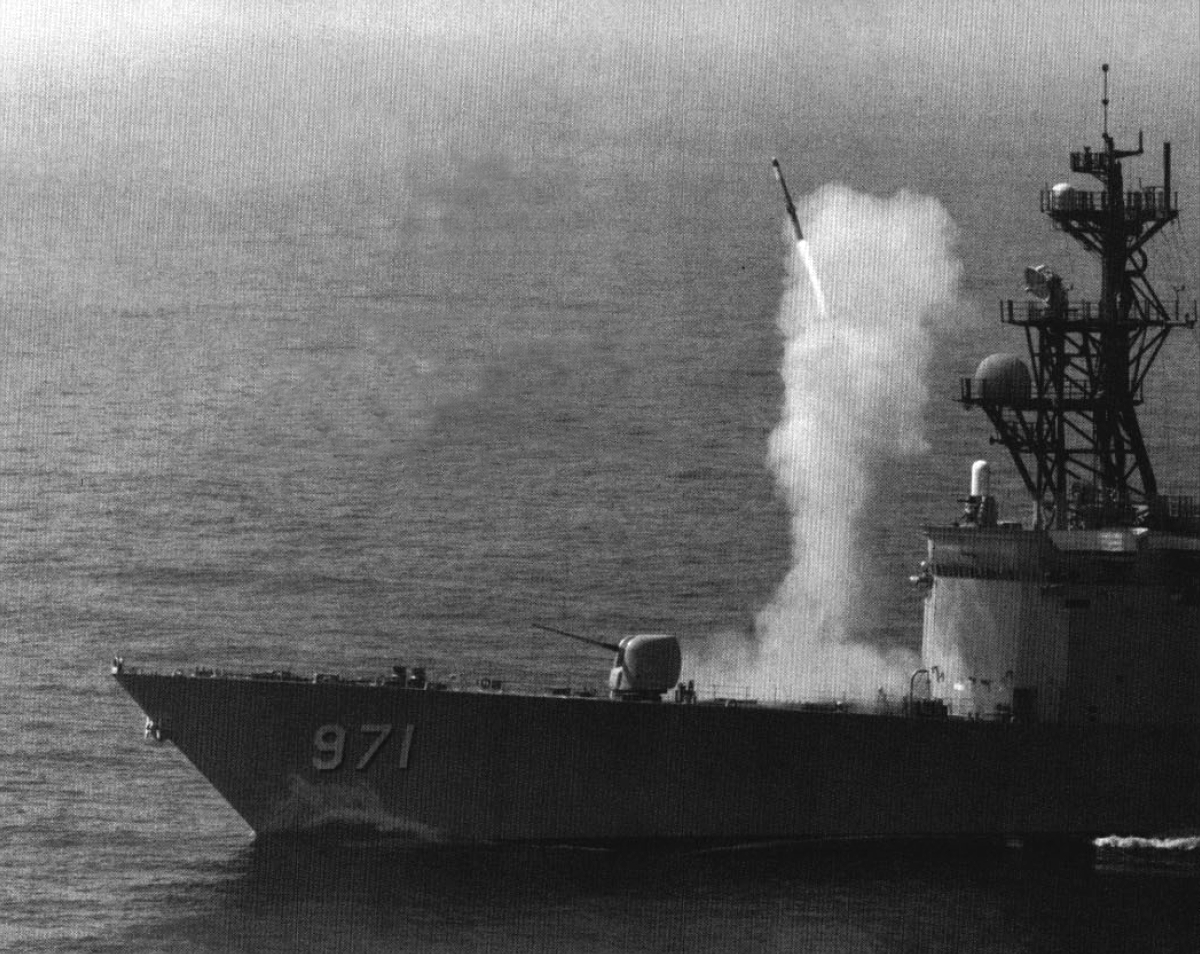
USS David R. Ray fires her RUR-5 ASROC in 1991

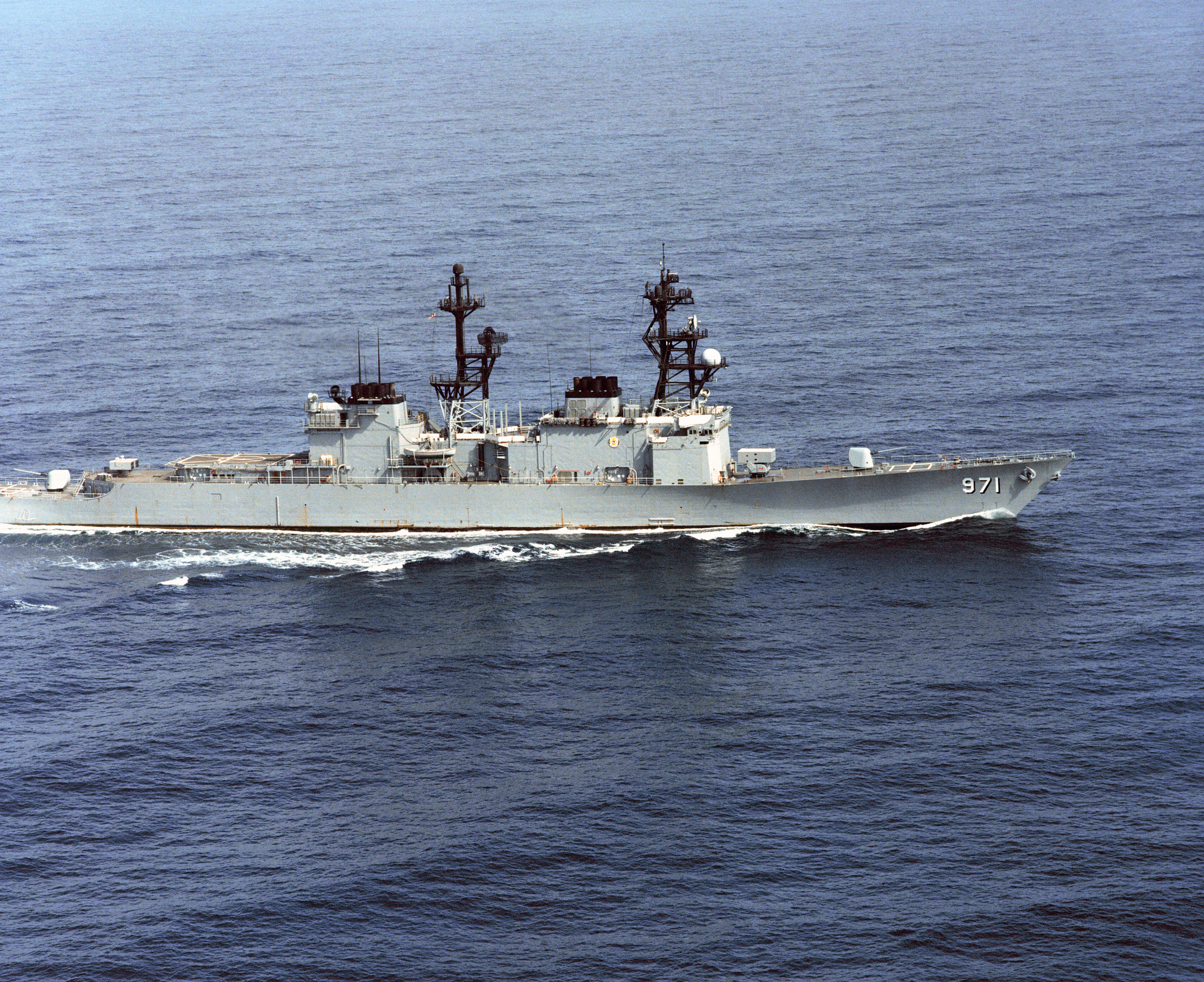
USS David R. Ray pre 1988

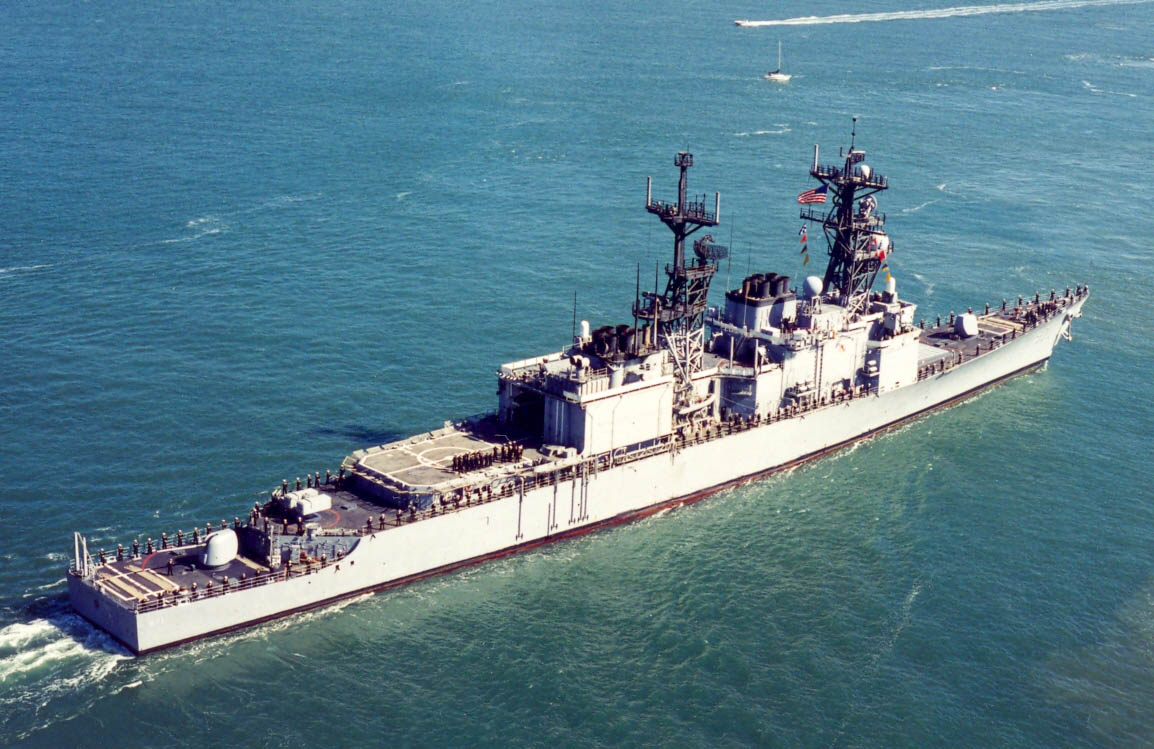
USS David R. Ray entering San Francisco in 1995
