= David R. Ray =

David Robert Ray
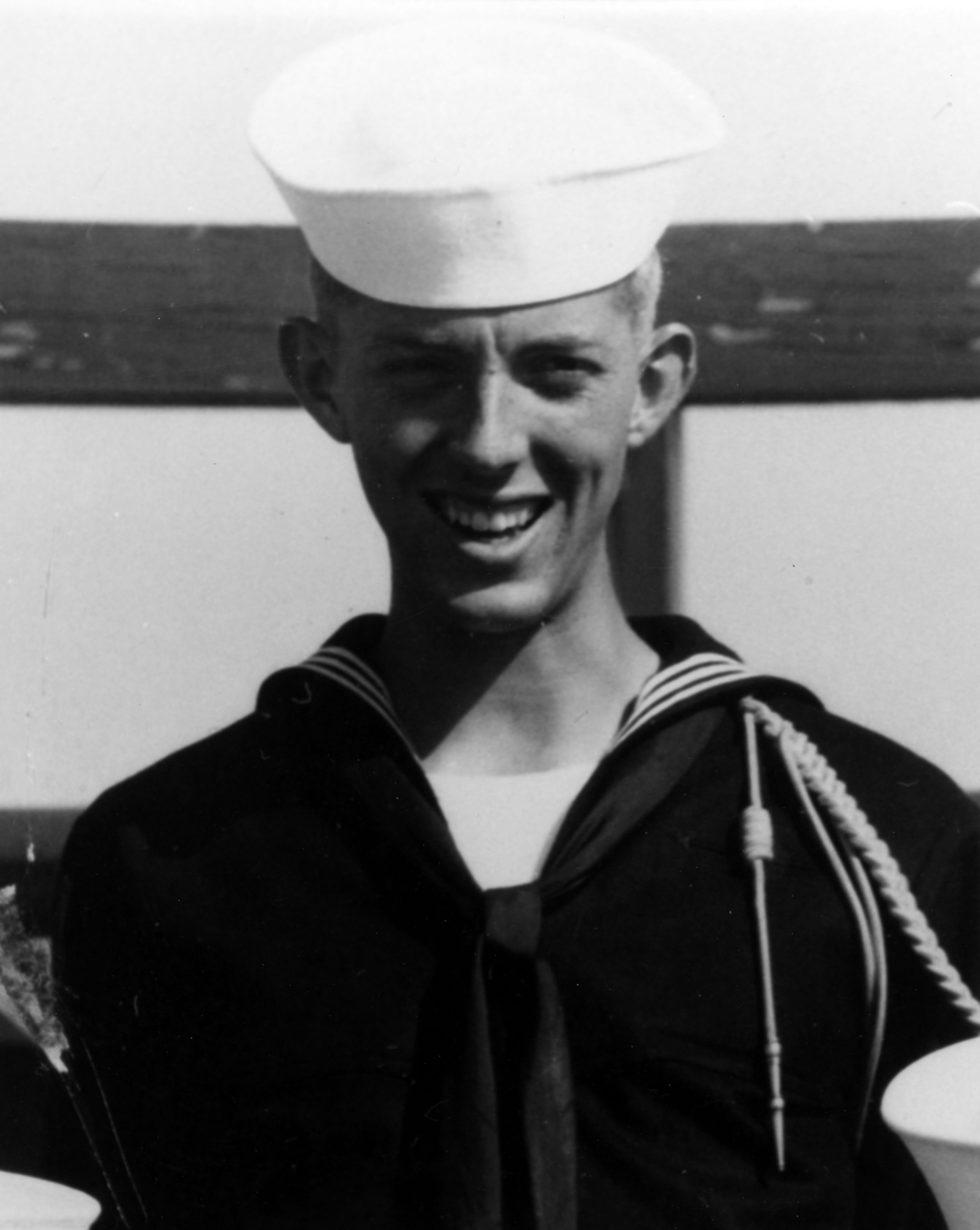
- Born: February 14, 1945; McMinnville, Tennessee, US
- Died: March 19, 1969 (aged 24) near An Hoa, Quảng Nam Province, South Vietnam
- Burial place: Mount View Cemetery, McMinnville, Tennessee
- Military career
- Allegiance: United States of America
- Branch: United States Navy
- Service years: 1966–1969
- Rank: Hospital corpsman second class
- Units: Battery D, 2nd Battalion, 11th Marines, 1st Marine Division
- Conflicts: Vietnam War †
- Awards: Medal of Honor; Purple Heart Medal; Combat Action Ribbon

David Robert "Bobby" Ray (February 14, 1945 – March 19, 1969) was a United States Navy hospital corpsman second class who was killed in action during the Vietnam War while assigned to an artillery battery of the United States Marine Corps. He was posthumously awarded the Medal of Honor for his heroic actions above and beyond the call of duty on March 19, 1969.

== Biography ==
Ray was born on February 14, 1945, to David F. and Donnie M. Ray of McMinnville, Tennessee. He graduated from City High School in McMinnville in 1963. He was a University of Tennessee Alumni Scholarship winner and attended classes at the Knoxville campus from 1963 to 1966. He also received an associate in arts degree in 1965 from Cumberland University in Lebanon, Tennessee. A memorial to Ray was placed on the Cumberland campus in 2003 in honor of his service and sacrifice.

=== U.S. Navy ===
==== Vietnam War ====
Ray enlisted in the U.S. Navy in Nashville, Tennessee, on March 28, 1966, and reported to Recruit Training Command, Naval Training Center, San Diego, California. Afterwards, he attended the former Naval Hospital Corps School in San Diego and became a hospital corpsman and promoted to hospital man on June 20. His first assignment as a corpsman was aboard the USS Haven where he was promoted to hospital corpsman third class on April 16, 1967. In December, following his tour on the hospital ship, he was assigned to the former U.S. Naval Hospital in Long Beach, California, where he was promoted to hospital corpsman second class.

In May 1968, Ray requested a tour of duty with the Fleet Marine Force and was sent to Field Medical Service School, Camp Pendleton, California, to become a FMF corpsman upon successful completion of the course. On July 12, he was sent to and arrived in South Vietnam, and was assigned to Battery D, 2nd Battalion, 11th Marine Regiment, 1st Marine Division (Reinforced), located at An Hoa, South Vietnam.

==== Death and burial ====
In the early morning of March 19, 1969, Fire Support Base Phu Loc 6, located on a hill adjacent to Liberty Bridge in Quảng Nam Province and the command post of the 1st Battalion, 5th Marines located near them, were both attacked by an estimated battalion of People's Army of Vietnam (PAVN) soldiers. Ray, the senior corpsman for Battery D, moved from parapet to parapet during the attack rendering medical aid to the wounded Marines. While doing this he was seriously wounded and then had to confront two PAVN soldiers attacking his position, killing one and wounding another. After he refused to be aided by the other Battery D corpsman, he continued his lifesaving efforts under oncoming enemy fire.

Ray's final act of heroism was aiding and protecting a wounded Marine after he had run out of ammunition. He placed himself upon the Marine after he saw a PAVN grenade land near them. Ray died after the grenade blast, while the Marine he sacrificed his life for, lived. Ray and eleven Marines from Battery D and two Marines and one Navy corpsman from the 1st Battalion, 5th Marines command post, were killed in the attack.

Ray was unmarried. His body was returned to the United States and was buried with full military honors in Mountain View Cemetery McMinnville, Tennessee.

== Military awards ==
Ray was posthumously presented the Medal of Honor in a White House ceremony on April 20, 1970, with his father accepting the medal on his son's behalf from Vice President Spiro T. Agnew.

Ray's military decorations and awards include:

Medal of Honor	Purple Heart Medal	Combat Action Ribbon
Navy Presidential Unit Citation	National Defense Service Medal	Vietnam Service Medal w/ FMF Combat Operation Insignia and three 3/16" bronze stars
Republic of Vietnam Meritorious Unit Citation (Gallantry Cross) w/ Palm and Frame	Republic of Vietnam Meritorious Unit Citation (Civil Actions) w/ Palm and Frame	Republic of Vietnam Campaign Medal w/ 1960- device

=== Medal of Honor citation ===
Rank and organization: Hospital Corpsman Second Class, U.S. Navy, 2d Battalion, 11th Marines, 1st Marine Division (Reinforced), III Marine Amphibious Force. Place and date: Quang Nam Province, Republic of Vietnam, March 19, 1969. Entered service at: Nashville, Tenn. Born: February 14, 1945, McMinnville, Tenn.

==== Citation ====
For conspicuous gallantry and intrepidity at the risk of his life above and beyond the call of duty while serving as a HM2 with Battery D, 2d Battalion, at Phu Loc 6, near An Hoa. During the early morning hours, an estimated battalion-sized enemy force launched a determined assault against the battery's position, and succeeded in effecting a penetration of the barbed-wire perimeter. The initial burst of enemy fire caused numerous casualties among the Marines who had immediately manned their howitzers during the rocket and mortar attack. Undaunted by the intense hostile fire, HM2 Ray moved from parapet to parapet, rendering emergency medical treatment to the wounded. Although seriously wounded himself while administering first aid to a Marine casualty, he refused medical aid and continued his lifesaving efforts. While he was bandaging and attempting to comfort another wounded Marine, HM2 Ray was forced to battle two enemy soldiers who attacked his position, personally killing one and wounding the other. Rapidly losing his strength as a result of his severe wounds, he nonetheless managed to move through the hail of enemy fire to other casualties. Once again, he was faced with the intense fire of oncoming enemy troops and, despite the grave personal danger and insurmountable odds, succeeded in treating the wounded and holding off the enemy until he ran out of ammunition, at which time he sustained fatal wounds. HM2 Ray's final act of heroism was to protect the patient he was treating. He threw himself upon the wounded Marine, thus saving the man's life when an enemy grenade exploded nearby. By his determined and persevering actions, courageous spirit, and selfless devotion to the welfare of his Marine comrades, HM2 Ray served to inspire the men of Battery D to heroic efforts in defeating the enemy. His conduct throughout was in keeping with the finest traditions of the U.S. Naval Service.

== Other honors ==
- USS David R. Ray (DD-971): Commissioned November 17, 1977 (decommissioned on February 2, 2002, at Naval Station Everett, Washington).
- David R. Ray Branch Medical Clinic, providing dental and medical care for beneficiaries in the Naval Station Everett area
- David R. Ray Branch Medical Clinic, providing dental and medical care for beneficiaries at The Basic School, MCB Quantico, VA
- David R. Ray (Battery D 2nd Battalion 11th Marines 1969) Naval Branch Medical/Dental Clinic, Camp Pendleton, California
- "Ray Hall, Naval Medical and Dental Clinic, The Basic School". Marine Corps Base Quantico, Virginia.
- Ray Hall, military housing hall, Camp Pendleton, California – dedicated June 22, 1974
- Highway 70S Bypass in McMinnville, Tennessee
- "Bobby Ray Memorial Elementary School in McMinnville, Tennessee". Archived from the original on February 4, 2009.
- Ray Clinic/Ray immunizations, USA MEDDAC, Ft. Huachuca, Arizona

== Vietnam Veterans Memorial ==
Ray's name appears on the Vietnam Veterans Memorial wall at panel 29W, row 082 in Washington, D.C.

== See also ==
- List of Medal of Honor recipients for the Vietnam War
