= David Ray Hate Crimes Prevention Act =

United States law

The David Ray Hate Crimes Prevention Act of 2009 (H.R. 254) or David's Law, was a bill first introduced in the United States House of Representatives on January 7, 2009, by Rep. Sheila Jackson-Lee of Texas. It was designed to enhance Federal enforcement of laws regarding hate crimes, and to specifically make sexual orientation, like race and gender, a protected class.

The bill stated that existing Federal law was inadequate to address violence motivated by race, color, national origin, religion, sexual orientation, gender, or disability of the victim. It called for the revision of Section 246* of title 18 of the United States Code as well as the addition of a subsection outlining the punishment for anyone found guilty of a hate crime. Statistics show that minority groups are the main victims of hate crimes. Crimes against gay men and lesbians are said, by researches in Los Angeles County, to be the most severe form of hate crimes. In summary, the bill's intention was to make illegal the willful harm or attempt to harm a person based on their actual or perceived gender or sexual orientation.

== Legal hate crime history ==
State legislators began to introduce hate crime laws starting in the 1970s to address racism, prejudice, and discrimination that escalated into more violent crimes. The first state law against hate crimes, titled California Section 190.2 was passed in 1978 in California. This statute's sole purpose was the enhance the penalty of crimes that were motivated by prejudice due to race, sexual orientation, ethnicity, disability, etc. In California, there was an increase in crimes committed against Asians based on their race, religion, and ethnicity based on a survey conducted by a spokesperson of the National LGBTQ Task Force. Research studies conducted by George Comstock in 1991, proved that there was a rise in hate crimes as of 1985 at the same time that policies against hate crimes were being created.

In 1990, President George Bush signed the Hate Crime Statistics Act which allowed analysis of hate crimes that occur across the country. However, hate crimes are often not reported which makes it virtually impossible to gather statistics and compare these statistics with other statistics. Hate crimes and bias crimes started to receive the attention of policymakers, community activists, and social scientists after there was a rise of hate crimes across the country committed in 1985. Hate crime convictions do not occur frequently because when crimes investigations occur, motives are tough to figure out in the eyes of the law.

Research is currently being conducted to investigate the effectiveness of hate crime legislation by the National Criminal Justice Reference Service.
