= Partridge, Kentucky =

Unincorporated community in Kentucky, United States

- Unincorporated community
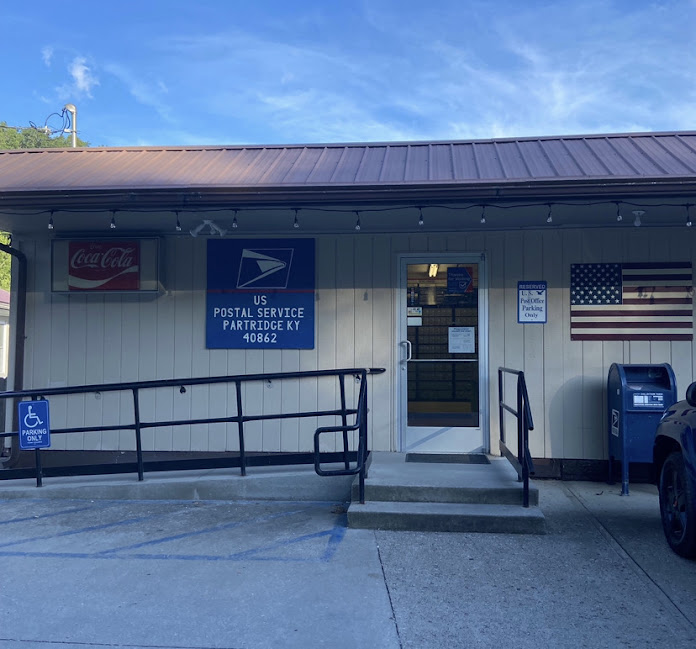
- Partridge post office

- Location in Kentucky Location in the United States
- Coordinates: 37°00′23″N 82°53′53″W
- Country: United States
- State: Kentucky
- County: Letcher
- Elevation: 1,535 ft (468 m)
- Time zone: UTC-5 (Eastern (EST))
  - Summer (DST): UTC-4 (EST)
- ZIP codes: 40862
- GNIS feature ID: 508781

Partridge is an unincorporated community in Letcher County, Kentucky, United States. It is located 8.6 miles (13.9 km) southwest of Whitesburg. Its Post office was established in 1869 and moved to a different location in 1923. It still operates a Post office with the ZIP code 40862.
