= List of people killed for being transgender =

This is a worldwide list of people who were killed for being transgender. The list does not include suicides, accidental deaths, or premature deaths. Some of the perpetrators in these cases cite the trans panic defense. Violence against transgender people is also known as trans bashing.

== Background ==
The murder of trans people has served as an impetus to the establishment of the Transgender Day of Remembrance (TDoR).

In 2019, the American Medical Association called the violence against trans people an "epidemic".

In 2020, ABC News "independently confirmed 34 violent deaths of transgender and gender non-conforming people in 2020 at the time of publication." This was published by Good Morning America. According to the Human Rights Campaign, at least 57 transgender and gender non-conforming people were killed in 2021, surpassing the total from 2020 of 44 people.

There are no federal or state databases tracking anti-transgender violence in the United States. Since 2013, Human Rights Campaign has collected data on trans and gender-nonconforming victims of homicide. In 2022, Insider created a database 175 transgender homicide victims in the United States and Puerto Rico between 2017 and 2021. Both reports have found the majority of victims were Black transgender women. Insider's report found that half were killed by people they'd been sexually intimate with, over a third were unsolved (with the murders of black women disproportionately unsolved), only 28 resulted in convictions, and only one resulted in a hate crime charge. Statistics are likely under reported due to law enforcement and media routinely misgendering or deadnaming transgender homicide victims.

A 2025 analysis of media coverage of trans homicides in 2022 found that while previous research had shown the media frequently downplayed transphobia as the primary cause of violence towards trans people, some recent studies pointed towards a shift wherein journalists discuss broader issues of transphobia, genderism, and systemic racism during their coverage of anti-trans homicides.

A 2023 analysis argued there exists a "trifecta of violence" wherein violent ideologies, violent government policies, and interpersonal violence directly relate to one another. It found that anti-trans rhetoric and anti-trans legislation were positively correlated with trans homicides.

== Before 1990 ==
=== Central America ===
The Spanish conquistador Vasco Núñez de Balboa massacred forty Indigenous persons in the Isthmus of Panama in 1513 by having them fed alive to dogs on charges of practicing sodomy, claiming they had worn women's clothing and engaged in sex acts with one another despite appearing to be male. Modern historians believe that some or all of the victims of the massacre were transfeminine and argue that they were killed for transgressing gender roles. Such persecution of transfeminine natives continued under Spanish rule, with those who were assigned male at birth but presented as female being charged with sodomy and executed or imprisoned.

=== Nazi Germany ===
The Nazi Regime targeted, imprisoned, and killed an indeterminate number of transgender people, especially trans women, attempting to eradicate a relatively large community that had thrived in Weimar Germany. Like many sent to concentration camps, the ultimate fates of transgender prisoners are usually unrecorded, but records exist of a small number of named victims.

- Liddy Bacroff, a trans woman, was killed in the Mauthausen concentration camp in 1943.
- A trans woman recorded as "H. Bode" is known to have been killed in the Buchenwald Concentration Camp.

=== Indonesia ===
The Indonesian 1960s Darul Islam regime in South Sulawesi also targeted transgender individuals for violent persecution. Long home to a variety of transgender and third-gender identities, the ascendant government cracked down on ceremonies and rituals of the non-binary bissu community. Individuals were subjected to public head-shaving, while some were tortured and murdered; reports from the time indicate bissu were given the choice of detransition or death. In Bone, the bissu Sanro Makgangke was decapitated, and their head was displayed publicly as a threat to others.

=== United States ===
Transgender sex workers Tanya Moore and Tina Rodriguez were picked up by two men in Philadelphia on 30 June 1986. Their mutilated bodies were found on fire in Middletown Township on 3 July. In 2001, an informant told police that they had been picked up by members of the Warlocks Motorcycle Club, who then killed them when they discovered they were transgender.

== 1990s ==
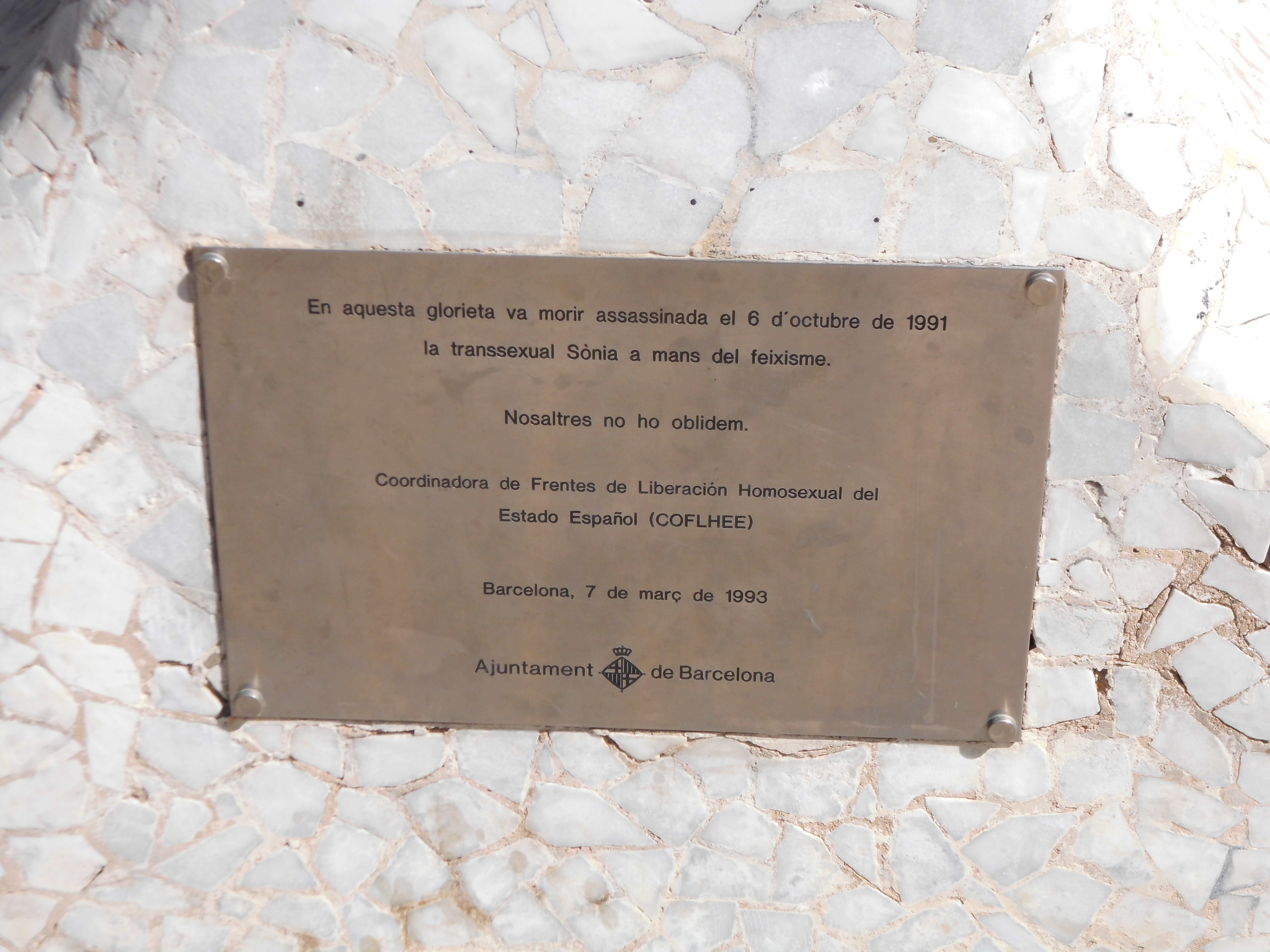
Plaque dedicated to Sonia Rescalvo Zafra on the bandstand of the Parc de la Ciutadella in Barcelona, Spain, near the place where she was murdered

- 1991 – Sonia Rescalvo Zafra, a 45-year-old transgender woman, was killed in the Parc de la Ciutadella in Barcelona by six neo-Nazi skinheads who kicked her and her friend Dori repeatedly in the head while they were lying on the floor. Her death spurred the LGBT community to publicly fight against violence.
- 1993 – Brandon Teena, a 21-year-old transgender man, was raped and murdered in Falls City, Nebraska, US, on December 31. Two men were convicted of first-degree murder in the incident, one of whom was sentenced to death. The crime became the subject of the Academy Award-winning film Boys Don't Cry.
- 1995 – Chanelle Pickett, a 23-year-old transgender woman, was strangled in Boston, Massachusetts on November 20 after spending the night at a man's apartment. The defendant, William C. Palmer, originally pled what may be the earliest known legal use of the trans panic defense. However, Palmer abandoned this story after the victim's sister revealed that he had known Pickett and been aware of her trans status. Her death was cited as part of the impetus behind the establishment of Transgender Day of Remembrance.
- 1996 – Also in Massachusetts, the body of Deborah "Debbie" Forte, a 56-year-old transgender woman, was discovered on May 15, having been strangled, beaten severely, and stabbed repeatedly in the breasts and chest. Her killer, Michael Thompson, was found guilty of second-degree murder and sentenced to life in prison. Thompson's coworker testified that after the murder, Thompson had come to work and confessed that he had gone home with Forte and begun "messing around", before killing her after realizing she had a penis.
- 1998 – Rita Hester was stabbed to death in her apartment by an unknown assailant. Her murder would become one of the major factors in the establishment of the Transgender Day of Remembrance.

== 2000s ==
- 2000 – Amanda Milan, a 25-year-old transgender woman, was walking by Times Square, Manhattan, New York City, when Dwayne McCuller walked up and began to harass and threaten her. Milan stood up to him and asked him if he wanted to fight. Witnesses said he declined. As he walked away, another young man, Eugene Celestine, told McCuller he had a knife. McCuller grabbed it, and stabbed Milan in the neck. A man named David Anderson reportedly helped McCuller escape from the scene. Milan died soon after at St. Vincent's Hospital. Transgender activist Sylvia Rivera worked towards seeing that Milan's death was investigated, and organized Milan's political funeral along with demonstrations claiming a disconnection of transgender rights from the larger LGBT communities. After Milan's murder, Rivera reformed a transgender activist group, Street Trans Activist Revolutionaries (STAR). Rivera cited the crime among the reasons to add a broad definition of gender to the New York City Human Rights Law.
- 2001 – Fred Martinez Jr., a transgender 16-year-old American from Cortez, Colorado, was bludgeoned to death with a rock in June 2001 by an 18-year-old man. Martinez' killer was sentenced in 2002 to serve between 4 and 48 years for the murder, and was paroled in 2019.
- 2002 – Gwen Araujo of Newark, California, a 17-year-old Hispanic transgender girl, was killed by four men, two of whom she had had sexual relations with, who beat and strangled her after discovering she was transgender. Two defendants were convicted of second-degree murder, but not convicted on the requested hate crime enhancements. The other two defendants pleaded guilty or no contest to voluntary manslaughter. In at least one of the trials, a trans panic defense – an extension of the gay panic defense – was employed.
- 2003 – Nireah Johnson was a 17-year-old African American transgender girl who was murdered along with her friend Brandie Coleman in Indianapolis, Indiana, by Paul Moore. Paul Moore was initially sexually attracted to Johnson, and then discovered that she was transgender. This led him to light her car on fire while she and Coleman were inside. Moore was sentenced to 120 years in prison for the murders while his half-brother, Clarence McGee, received a 10-year sentence as an accomplice.
- 2003 – Janice Roberts was an American transgender woman who was kidnapped by serial killer William Devin Howell on 18 June. Howell later told an informant that he tried to engage Roberts in a sexual act and strangled her when he realized that she was transgender.
- 2003 – Shelby Tracy Tom was a Canadian transgender woman working as a sex worker in North Vancouver, British Columbia, Canada, who was killed by Jatin Patel on 27 May 2003. According to Patel, while having sex with her, she noticed Tom's surgery scars, and she panicked as a result and strangled her. The prosecutor attempted to classify Tom's death as a hate crime, but Supreme Court of British Columbia Justice Patrick Dohm ruled that the crime was not motivated by hate, because Patel did not know of Tom's transgender identity when meeting her, and thus could not have targeted her for it. Patel's defense attorney used a trans panic defense on her behalf. She pleaded guilty to a charge of manslaughter, and was sentenced to nine years in jail. Patel subsequently came out as a transgender woman.
- 2006 – Gisberta Salce Júnior, a Brazilian homeless transgender woman, was murdered in Porto, Portugal, by a group of 14 youths between 12 and 16 years old, who tortured and raped her for three days, and finally threw her, still alive, into a well over 15 meters deep, where she drowned. Eleven of the minors received minimal sentences of under 13 months in a semi-open education center of the Instituto de Reinserção Social, and two received sentences of additional education. Her death became a symbol of violence against women and the LGBT community, and shortly after, laws protecting trans women were introduced in Portugal.
- 2007 – Roberto González Onrubia, a transgender man, was killed by two women who had found refuge in his apartment, in Madrid, Spain. Both women had been mistreating Roberto physically and psychologically for a year before they killed him on 29 August 2007 with a brutal hit on the head. Both women were condemned to 19 years in prison.
- 2008 – Angie Zapata was a transgender woman who was murdered on 17 July 2008, in Greeley, Colorado. Her death was the first case involving a transgender victim to be ruled a hate crime. Colorado is one of eleven states that protect transgender victims under hate crime laws in the United States. Allen Andrade, who learned eighteen-year-old Angie was transgender after meeting her and spending several days with her, beat her to death with a fire extinguisher. In his arrest affidavit, Andrade called Zapata "it", and during his trial, a tape was played of a phone conversation in which he told his girlfriend "gay things need to die". Andrade's attorneys used a trans panic defense. On 22 April 2009, Andrade was found guilty of first degree murder, hate crimes, and car/ID theft. He was sentenced to life in prison without the possibility of parole.
- 2009 – Vicky Hernández, a 25- or 26-year-old Honduran transgender woman and activist, was murdered by the Honduran police. Her case prompted Honduras' president to apologize for the crime in 2022, the first case in which a Honduran president apologized for a crime against a member of the LGBT community there.

== 2010s ==
- 2010 – Victoria Carmen White, an African American transgender woman, was murdered in New Jersey, US, on 12 September 2010. Alrashim Chambers was brought to trial for her death, but he was acquitted; he blamed another man, Marquise Foster, for the murder. The only motive suggested was transphobic violence; "You a dude?" was heard by White's friends (who were in an adjacent room) shortly before gunshots were fired.
- 2011 – Dee Dee Pearson, an African American transgender woman, was murdered in Kansas City, Missouri, US, on 24 December 2011. Kenyon Jones confessed to the murder, telling police that he had paid Pearson for sex, and after he found out she was transgender, he killed her in anger. He was convicted of second degree murder and armed criminal action, and was sentenced to 30 years in jail.
- 2011 – Svetlana was a transgender woman from Moscow, Russia. She was beaten to death with a shovel by two people, who had intended to have sex with her. It was suggested that they were motivated to kill her after they learned she was transgender.
- 2012 – Brandy Martell, a black trans woman, was shot dead on 29 April 2012 while sitting in a car with her friends in Oakland, California. Police said the shooting followed an argument with her killer, who became enraged when he realized she was transgender. The killer was identified as Malique Parrott, who was himself murdered two months later.
- 2013 – Carmen Guerrero, a transgender woman was killed by her cellmate, Miguel Crespo, at Kern Valley State Prison in California's Central Valley.
- 2013 – Islan Nettles, a 21-year-old African American transgender woman, was beaten to death in Harlem, New York, on 17 August after a group of at least seven men accosted her and two of her transgender friends. One of the men, James Dixon, had been flirting with her. After he realized she was transgender, he struck her. After falling down, Dixon proceeded to beat her. She died of head injuries in hospital. Her death prompted a number of protests. On 21 April 2016, Dixon was sentenced 12 years in prison after pleading guilty to manslaughter.
- 2013 – Dwayne Jones, a Jamaican 16-year-old, was beaten, stabbed, and run over by a car in Montego Bay on 22 July 2013, after attending a party in women's clothing for the first time.
- 2014 – Jennifer Laude was murdered in Olongapo, Philippines, on 11 October. Joseph Scott Pemberton was convicted of the murder. Pemberton reportedly killed her after discovering she was transgender.
- 2014 – Çağla Joker was fatally shot in Istanbul on 21 April, while another transgender woman survived. The suspects claimed that they initially wanted sexual relations with her and her friend, but shot both when they discovered they were transgender.
- 2014 – Kimberly Sody, a 28-year-old transfeminine sex worker, was beaten to death in a hotel room in Santo Domingo, Dominican Republic. After beating her into a coma from which she never recovered, her attackers specifically cut her long hair, which was cited as evidence of transphobic motivation.
- 2014 – Cenida Ramos, aged 18, was fatally stabbed and left to die on the sidewalk of Elston Kerr Street in Belize City, Belize on 12 January by two male suspects. Family and LGBTQ rights organisations suspected a hate crime, but police pointed to armed robbery as motive.
- 2015 – Mercedes Williamson, aged 17, was stabbed and beaten to death with a claw hammer in George County, Mississippi on 30 May 2015 by her boyfriend Joshua Vallum. Vallum was a member of the Latin Kings gang, which forbids homosexual activity, and was forced to kill Williamson, a pre-operative transgender woman, when other members found out. Vallum was convicted of both state murder charges, for which he received life imprisonment without parole, and federal charges of hate crimes under the Hate Crimes Prevention Act, for which he was sentenced to forty-nine years imprisonment; prosecutors chose not to seek life imprisonment on the federal charges, owing to Vallum's childhood abuse.
- 2016 – Paola Ledezma, a 27-year-old transgender woman who was rejected by her family and left her birthplace to become a sex worker in Mexico City, was shot on 30 September by client Arturo Felipe Delgadillo Olvera, who became angry after he found out that she was transgender. Delgadillo, an armed security guard, was released after a judge determined that there was insufficient evidence to prosecute.
- 2016 – Rae'Lynn Thomas, a 28-year-old African American transgender woman, was shot twice in front of her mother, and then beaten to death by James Allen Byrd in Columbus, Ohio, on 10 August, as she begged for her life. Byrd called her "the devil" and made transphobic comments. Her family called for the murder to be investigated as a hate crime, but Ohio hate crime statutes do not cover gender identity.
- 2016 – Jessica Mendes Cavalcanti, a 24-year-old transgender woman, was surrounded by two young men and fatally stabbed to death in the Canaa neighborhood of Uberlandia on 19 April. One of the suspects who was apprehended by police confessed that they had committed the crime because Cavalcanti was transgender.
- 2017 – Amna, 35 years old, and Meeno, 26 years old, both Khwaja Sara Pakistanis, were allegedly beaten to death and tortured by Saudi police in Riyadh on 28 February. Their clothing and jewelry was also confiscated by the police.
- 2017 – Chanda Sharmeeli, a 30-year-old transgender woman, was shot dead in Karachi, Pakistan, sometime on 30 August or early morning 31 August. She had been with a gathering of other trans people discussing what they believed to be a recent under-counting of Pakistan's trans community, when a gang of armed men began harassing them, and eventually shot Chanda.
- 2017 – Bianca, a 32-year-old transgender sex worker from Caracas, Venezuela, was beaten to death by a 29-year-old client "who was shocked by her masculine features". The incident took place in her house in Arnhem, Netherlands on 29 September 2017.
- 2017 – Dandara dos Santos, a 42-year-old travesti (Transgender in Spanish), was beaten and shot to death in Bom Jardim, a neighborhood in Fortaleza, Ceará.
- 2017 – Wilka, a 40-year-old Brazilian transgender woman, was attacked and killed on 26 March in Pernambuco, in the southern state of Loteamento Luiz Gonzaga. She suffered three stab wounds. According to a friend she was murdered when someone realized that she was transgender whilst attempting to rob her.
- 2018 – Following a false rumor that transgender women were kidnapping children for sex trafficking in Hyderabad, India, four transgender women were attacked by a mob on 26 May 2018. One of the women died. Local police issued an "Appeal to Public" saying that the rumors of criminal involvement by transgender women were "fake", and that the public should not "take law into your hands ... so that innocents won't become a victim of those rumors anymore."
- 2018 – Laysa Fortuna, a 25-year-old transgender woman, was stabbed in the chest, in Aracaju, Sergipe, on 18 October 2018. The aggressor said that if Bolsonaro were elected president, all trans people and transvestites would be killed. Bolsonaro did not comment.
- 2018 – Nataly Briyth Sánchez, an undocumented sex worker originally from Honduras, was murdered during a sexual encounter on 19 June in Tapachula, Mexico. The client stabbed her to death after discovering that she was transgender.
- 2018 – Kelly Stough, 36, an African American transgender woman, was murdered in Palmer Park, Detroit, in December. Albert Weathers, 46, a preacher, has been charged with her murder, and prosecutors claim her gender identity was a motivator.
- 2018 – Anastasiya Sapaeva, 43, an actress. Originally from Velikovo, Gorokhovetsky District, Vladimir Oblast, Russia. She was killed in 2018 in Moscow. She became a victim of bullies who did not like her appearance.
- 2019 – Nikki Kuhnhausen, a 17-year-old transgender girl, was murdered by David Y. Bogdanov. Her body was identified from decayed human remains on Saturday, 7 December, in the Larch Mountain area near Vancouver, Washington. Authorities were able to identify the body as Kuhnhausen from personal effects; subsequent examination showed she died from strangulation. Kuhnhausen had previously been missing since 5 June (reported 10 June) when she left with David Y. Bogdanov, a 25-year-old male, who has since been charged with second degree murder. Authorities believe the suspect, looking for a sexual encounter, became enraged upon learning of her transgender status. On 26 February 2020, the Washington State Legislature passed the Nikki Kuhnhausen Act, outlawing the use of panic defenses based on gender and sexual identities. The act preempts the trial of Kuhnhausen's alleged killer, and thus prevents the use of that defense.
- 2019 – Nina Surgutskaya, 25, was killed, dismembered, and partially cooked by her boyfriend, Mikhail Tikhonov, a doctor, in Kursk, western Russia. He became angry upon learning that she was assigned male at birth, which was his motivation for the crime. He also flushed some of Nina's body parts down the toilet and put her limbs and head in a suitcase.
- 2019 – Chynal Lindsey, 26, an African American transgender woman, was murdered by Ruben Alvarado in Dallas, Texas. Alvarado met with Lindsey for a sexual encounter and killed her upon discovering that she was a trans woman. He was convicted of first degree murder, and sentenced to 37 years in prison.
- 2019 – Dime Doe, an African American transgender woman, was murdered by Daqua Lameek Ritter in Allendale, South Carolina. Ritter did not want others to know he and Doe were having an affair. In February 2024, he was found guilty of a hate crime based on gender identity, the first such federal trial in the U.S.

== 2020s ==
- 2020 – Alexa Luciano Ruiz was fatally shot in Puerto Rico on 24 February, after an incident in a local restroom. Carmen Yulín Cruz called attention to her death before the 2020 Puerto Rico gubernatorial election, and Puerto Rican Governor Wanda Vázquez Garced announced the crime would be investigated as a hate crime. However, her assailants have not been caught. Ms. Luciano was killed while the assailant men laughed. Several hours before her murder, Luciano was also attacked repeatedly with a paintball gun; her assailants in that prior assault pled guilty in 2023 to assaulting her for her gender identity.
- 2020 – Selena Reyes-Hernandez, 37, was fatally shot in Chicago, Illinois, on 31 May by a man she went home with, after telling him that she was transgender.
- 2020 – Brayla Stone, 17, was murdered in Arkansas in June 2020 by a man seeking to conceal his sexual relationship with her; the killer was "afraid of being considered homosexual" were Stone to reveal their relationship; he pled guilty and was sentenced to 50 years in prison.
- 2020 – Valera (name is changed in the report), a 46-year-old janitor, was killed on 10 February in Chelyabinsk, Russia, by his dorm roommates after they learned he was a transgender man.
- 2020 – Serena Angelique Velázquez, 32, and Layla Pelaez, 21, both transgender women, were found burned to death on 22 April in Humacao, Puerto Rico.
- 2021 – Tehuel de la Torre, an Argentine transgender man from San Vicente, Buenos Aires, disappeared after leaving his home for a job interview in Alejandro Korn. Although Torre's body was never found, prosecutors charged Luis Ramos and Oscar Montes with murdering him, alleging they were motivated by hatred for his gender identity. Ramos was convicted of Torre's murder in 2024. This was the first case in Argentinian history to be successfully prosecuted as an anti-transgender homicide.
- 2021 – Ebeng Mayor, a transgender man from Batasan Hills, Philippines, was found raped, mutilated, and killed on 20 May 2021, after being missing for three days. Three suspects were arrested and confessed to the crime.
- 2022 – Doski Azad, a 23-year-old Kurdish transgender woman, was murdered by her brother in a claimed honor killing for being transgender.
- 2022 – Luo, a Chinese transgender woman, was murdered for using a male public restroom in Wuhan Paradise Walk, a shopping mall in Wuhan, China.
- 2022 – Ariyanna Mitchell, a 17-year-old African American transgender girl from Virginia, was shot and killed by 19-year-old Jimmy LeShawn Williams with an assault rifle, after he asked her if she was transgender, and she replied, "yes".
- 2022 – Cherry Bush, a homeless 48-year-old transgender woman, was shot to death in Los Angeles after being subjected to transphobic and derogatory comments. Her alleged killer has been charged with a hate crime.
- 2022 – Five people were killed in the Colorado Springs nightclub shooting at the LGBTQ nightclub Club Q in Colorado Springs on the night of 19–20 November 2022. At least two of the victims, Daniel Aston and Kelly Loving, were transgender. The shooter, who had a history of hatred against the gay and transgender communities (though they self-identified as non-binary during court proceedings), later pleaded guilty to hate crimes charges.
- 2023 – Brianna Ghey, 16, was stabbed to death in Culcheth Linear Park on 11 February 2023 by two assailants. One killer, Eddie Ratcliffe, referred to Ghey repeatedly as "it", rather than "she", with the judge stating that Ratcliffe "undoubtedly displayed hostility to Brianna based on her transgender identity". Transphobia was recognised as a motive by the court; the Crown Prosecution Service successfully argued for a harsher sentence for both killers given hate served as a motive.
- 2024 – Abuja Area Mama, a Nigerian transgender woman, was found murdered on August 8, 2024. Her body was found along the Katampe-Mabushi Expressway in the Banex, Wuse 2 area of the Federal Capital Territory.
- 2024 – Kesaria Abramidze, a Georgian transgender model, was stabbed to death by her partner Beka Jaiani in September 2024. The crime was linked to a law passed the previous day which severely restricted the rights of the LGBTQ community. The prosecution alleged that transphobia was the motive for the crime, with witnesses accusing Jaiani of subjecting Abramidze to transphobic abuse during their relationship. Jaiani was convicted of murder with an aggravating circumstance of gender identity hatred.
- 2025 – Sara Millerey González, 32, a trans woman from Bello, Antioquia, Colombia, was killed in April 2025. Millerey was raped, tortured, and thrown into a ravine by a group of men. Denounced as a hate crime by press and Antioquia's mayor, the Colombian National Working Group on Violence Based on Victims' Sexual Orientation or Gender Identity is collaborating with the Attorney's General's Office on identifying remaining suspects.
- 2025 – Christina Hayes, a 28-year-old transgender woman, was murdered behind a laundromat in Detroit, Michigan on June 21, 2025. In 2026, an 18-year-old man pleaded guilty to a hate crime for killing Hayes.
- 2025 – Daquan "Dream" Johnson, a 28-year-old transgender woman, was fatally shot in Northeast Washington, D.C., in July 2025. A suspect was arrested in North Carolina in September 2025. The suspect allegedly became enraged upon learning that Johnson was transgender, telling her "no disrespect but you are a male" and calling her homophobic slurs before shooting her.

== See also ==
- Violence against transgender people
- Transphobia
- Transgender genocide
- Violence against transgender people in the United States
