= Murder of Angie Zapata =

American murdered trans woman (1989–2008)

Angie Zapata
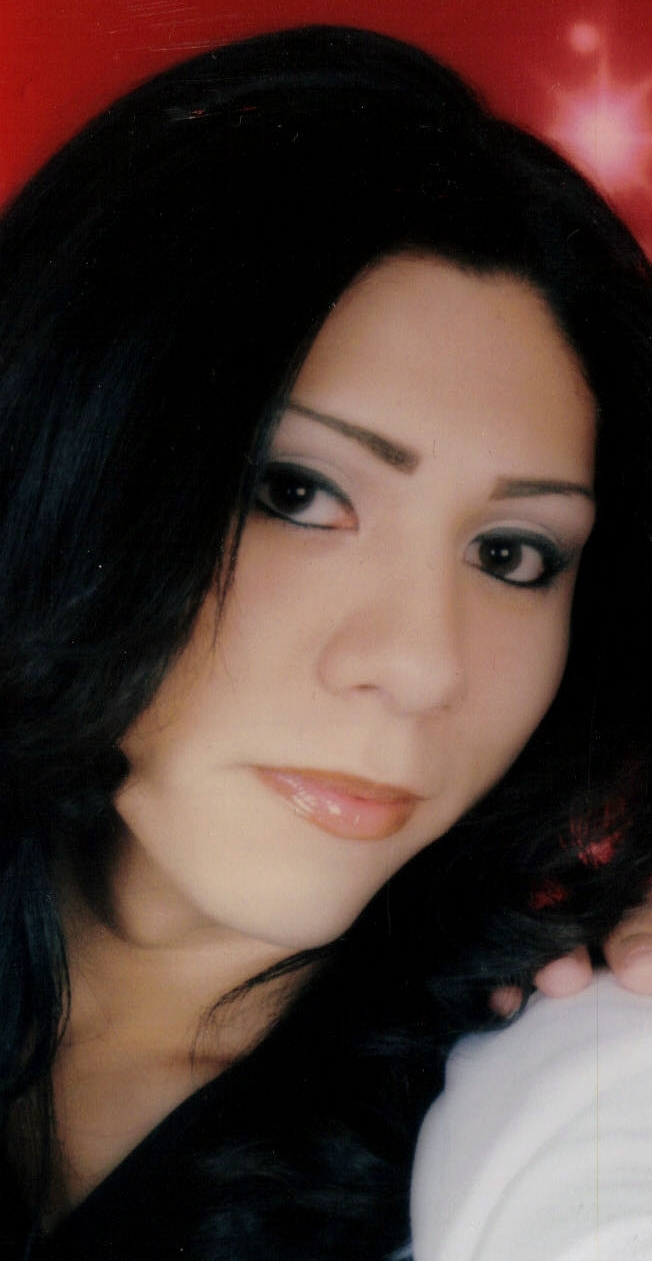
- Born: August 5, 1989; Brighton, Colorado, U.S.
- Died: July 17, 2008 (aged 18); Greeley, Colorado, U.S.

Angie Zapata (August 5, 1989 – July 17, 2008) was an American trans woman beaten to death in Greeley, Colorado. Her killer, Allen Andrade, was convicted of first-degree murder and committing a hate crime, because he murdered her after learning she was transgender. The case was the first in the nation to get a conviction for a hate crime involving a transgender victim, which occurred in 2009. Zapata's story and murder were featured on Univision's November 1, 2009 Aquí y Ahora television show.

== Early life ==
Zapata was born on August 5, 1989, in Brighton, Colorado. From an early age, Zapata was feminine and expressed an attraction to boys. In middle school, Zapata disclosed her female gender identity to family and close friends. She adopted the name "Angie" when amongst family, while presenting as male in public. At the age of 16, she began living full-time as a woman.

Zapata had three sisters and an older brother, Gonzalo. Her family was supportive, although her mother worried for her safety.

== Murder and trial ==
Zapata was 18 when she met Allen Andrade (aged 31 at the time) through the mobile phone social network MocoSpace. According to Andrade, the two met on July 15, 2008, and spent nearly three days together, during which Zapata performed oral sex on Andrade but refused to let Andrade touch her. Andrade suspected Zapata was transgender after seeing photographs of her and confirmed she was transgender after grabbing her genitals after confronting her, to which she said "I am all woman".

He subsequently began beating her—first with his fists and then with a fire extinguisher —until she was dead. Zapata attempted to sit up and "gurgled” but Andrade hit her on the head again to make sure she was dead.

In the arrest affidavit, Andrade said he thought he had "killed it" before leaving in Zapata's car with the murder weapon and other incriminating evidence. Andrade was arrested near his residence driving Zapata's car.

The possibility of prosecuting the case as a hate crime was pressed by Zapata's family. The actual trial began on April 16, 2009. During the trial, the jury heard jailhouse conversations in which Andrade told a girlfriend that "gay things must die". Part of Andrade's confession was deemed inadmissible as police had ignored Andrade's attempt to invoke his right to remain silent.

On April 22, 2009, Andrade was found guilty of first-degree murder, hate crimes, aggravated motor vehicle theft, and identity theft. He was sentenced to life in prison without the possibility of parole. As Andrade had six prior felony convictions, the judge dubbed him a "habitual criminal" at his May 8, 2009 sentencing trial for the hate crime and theft convictions. This added an additional 60 years to his sentence. As of October 2015, Andrade was serving his time at Limon Correctional Facility.

== Dedication ==
The 2011 novel The Butterfly and the Flame by Dana De Young was dedicated in part to Zapata's memory.

Ozomatli references Zapata in their song "Gay Vatos in Love", on their 2010 album Fire Away.

== See also ==
- Murder of Gwen Araujo
- Brandon Teena
- List of people killed for being transgender
