= Violence against transgender people in the United States =

Social and political issue in the U.S.

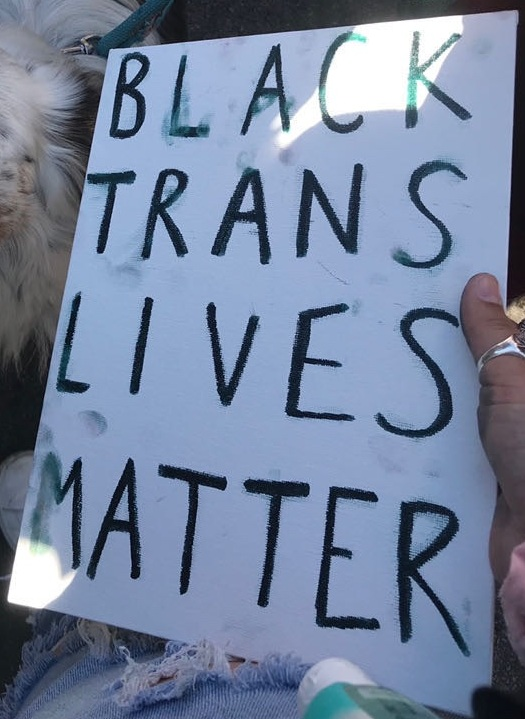
Poster from the Drag March for Change in Chicago, Illinois. The march was held in June 2020.

Violence against transgender people in the United States includes sexual and physical violence against transgender people, and which may, on occasion, result in death. Statistically, transgender people are more likely to be violently attacked. Between 2008 and 2020, 271 murders on trans people were reported in USA, giving c. 0.83 murders per 1,000,000 inhabitants and placing USA somewhere in the middle between "safe" and "unsafe" states, with reservation for inaccuracies and possible underreporting from some locations.

In December 2025, the Williams Institute published a study finding that hate crimes targeting transgender and gender nonconforming people tripled in the state of California between 2013 and 2024.

== Sexual violence ==
Sexual violence is defined by the Centers for Disease Control and Prevention as an "experience of a sexual act (e.g., rape, unwanted sexual touching, pressure or coercion to engage in sexual acts) committed against an individual without their freely given consent". The documentation of sexual assault cases against transgender individuals is limited. According to the 2015 U.S. Transgender Survey, 37% of transgender women and 51% of transgender men have been sexually assaulted in their lifetime.

Instances of sexual violence against transgender women happen for the first time at the median age of 15 years old. The notion that transgender youth are more likely to experience acts of sexual violence has been verified by several other studies. These acts occur most often by peers and other young people. This is attributed to the way that their peers view their gender identity.

Sexual violence against transgender women is often committed by people known by the victim, such as romantic partners or family members. A 2008 study found that, out of 80 perpetrators reported by transgender men and women, 81% of the perpetrators were cis men, 16% were cis women, and 2% were transgender.

== Physical violence ==
Physical violence in this context is used to describe any physical interaction between two or more individuals with the intent to cause bodily harm. Physical violence against the transgender community occurs at a rate similar to that of sexual violence. A study of transgender individuals in Virginia, published in 2007, found that 40% of those interviewed had experienced an instance of physical violence. Around 69% of such attacks were, according to interviewees, due to their gender identity. The assaults occurred at a median age of 16 and were reported as early as 13 years old. Of those participants who reported at least one assault, at least 12% said they had experienced over 20 instances of physical violence in their lifetime.

A study published in 2021 by the Williams Institute at UCLA School of Law found that transgender people in the United States are more likely to be violently attacked than cisgender people. The study found 86.1 attacks for every 1,000 transgender women and 23.7 attacks for every 1,000 cisgender women; it also found 107.5 attacks for every 1,000 transgender men and 19.8 attacks for every 1,000 cisgender men.

Transgender women who are sex workers experience a disproportionately higher level of violence in the United States. A study of transgender female sex workers conducted in Washington, D.C., found that approximately 65% of those interviewed reported an instance of physical assault, most often by their customers. When asked why they believe that they are assaulted, the transgender sex workers answered that it was because their client misunderstood their anatomy as a transgender woman. One participant stated that if the male clients see "female" breasts and "male" genitals, they expect to get a "knife through [the] throat".

=== Homicide ===
A 2017 analysis published by Alexis Dinno in the American Journal of Public Health attempted to estimate the transgender murder rate using homicide data from the Transgender Day of Remembrance and National Coalition of Anti-Violence Programs, along with estimates of the overall transgender population in the United States. The study generated a number of potential estimates of the trans murder rate, ranging from around 7 times lower than the rate for cis people (assuming no undercounting of trans murders, and a trans prevalence of 0.6% of the population) up to 4 times higher (assuming 80% of trans murders are not accounted for, and a trans prevalence of 0.1%), ultimately concluding that the trans murder rate was "likely to be less than that of cisgender individuals". Dinno described this as a surprising result, given that transgender people are more likely to be financially vulnerable and report experiencing high rates of violence. However, Dinno found that young (aged 15 to 34) black and Latina trans women were "almost certainly" killed at a higher rate than cis women.

In 2026, the civil rights organization JULIAN released a report, "A Crimson Record: Seven State Modern-Day Lynching Report 2000–2025", which questioned whether hate crimes against trans women were being misclassified as suicides.

== Verbal abuse ==
In a recent study of crimes reported against transgender individuals, the researchers found that in many instances there were reports of verbal abuse directed towards the victims. The examples of verbal abuse reported during the crimes included homophobic and transphobic slurs and language. These attacks were mainly towards their gender and perceived identity.

== Violence against transgender women of color ==
Young transgender women of color experience violence and murder at a rate much higher than that of their white transgender counterparts. A study conducted by the Gender Public Advocacy Coalition sought to examine the transgender murder rate from 1995 to 2005. The study focused on victims that were under the age of 30. Of the 51 victims that they analyzed, 91% of them were people of color. In a separate study conducted by Garofalo et al. (2006), the self-report survey revealed that 52% of the 51 transgender women of color had been raped. This study also found that MTF transgender youth of color are at risk of homelessness, substance abuse, and contracting HIV.

Violence towards trans women of colour is often perpetrated by a romantic partner or a potential romantic partner. Cisgender men have been found to dehumanize transgender women of color based on stereotypes that they associate with the community, for example that transgender women of color perform sex work or suffer from substance abuse. These stereotypes has been perpetuated by both straight and gay cisgender men that are seeking a romantic relationship with a transgender woman of color. Transgender women of color also report that cisgender men often engage in the hyper-sexualization of the community, leading to trans women feeling objectified.

Cisgender men that enter a romantic relationship with a transgender woman of color often conceal their romantic involvement; this includes refusal to be seen with a transgender woman in public, on social media, or in any way that might suggest a relationship. This has been attributed to the social stigma surrounding these women.

These forms of rejection, concealment, and over sexualization may result in psychological trauma. Some transgender women of color have reported that they have never been in a healthy relationship. This deeply affects their feelings of self worth.

== Resources for transgender people experiencing violence ==
There are several resources available for members of the LGBTQ+ community when they are in times of crisis. One leading national organization for the LGBTQ+ youth is The Trevor Project, which assists with crisis intervention and suicide prevention.

Another available resource is the Trans Lifeline, which is an organization that provides a hotline for direct emotional and financial support to transgender individuals.

== See also ==
- List of people killed for being transgender
- Trans panic
- Transgender genocide
- Violence against prostitutes
- Violence against LGBT people
- Violence against transgender people
