= Murder of Sonia Rescalvo Zafra =

Murder of Spanish trans woman murdered by a group of neo-Nazis in 1991

Sonia Rescalvo Zafra
- Born: 1946; Cuenca, Spain
- Died: 6 October 1991 (aged 44–45); Barcelona, Catalonia, Spain
- Cause of death: Blunt trauma (murder)
- Known for: First known victim of transphobic murder in Spain

Sonia Rescalvo Zafra (Spanish pronunciation: [ˈsonja resˈkalβo ˈθafɾa]; 1946 – 6 October 1991) was a Spanish trans woman who was murdered by a group of neo-Nazis in the Parc de la Ciutadella in Barcelona on 6 October 1991. Her murder is notable for being the first known case in Spain of a person being murdered for being transgender.

== Background ==
Sonia was born in Cuenca, Spain in 1946 to parents Leopoldo Rescalvo and Dolores Zafra. She moved to Barcelona at the age of 16 and began working as a showgirl in theatres on the Avinguda del Paral·lel. Later in life, she fell on hard times and became homeless and addicted to drugs, turning to sex work to survive.

== Murder ==
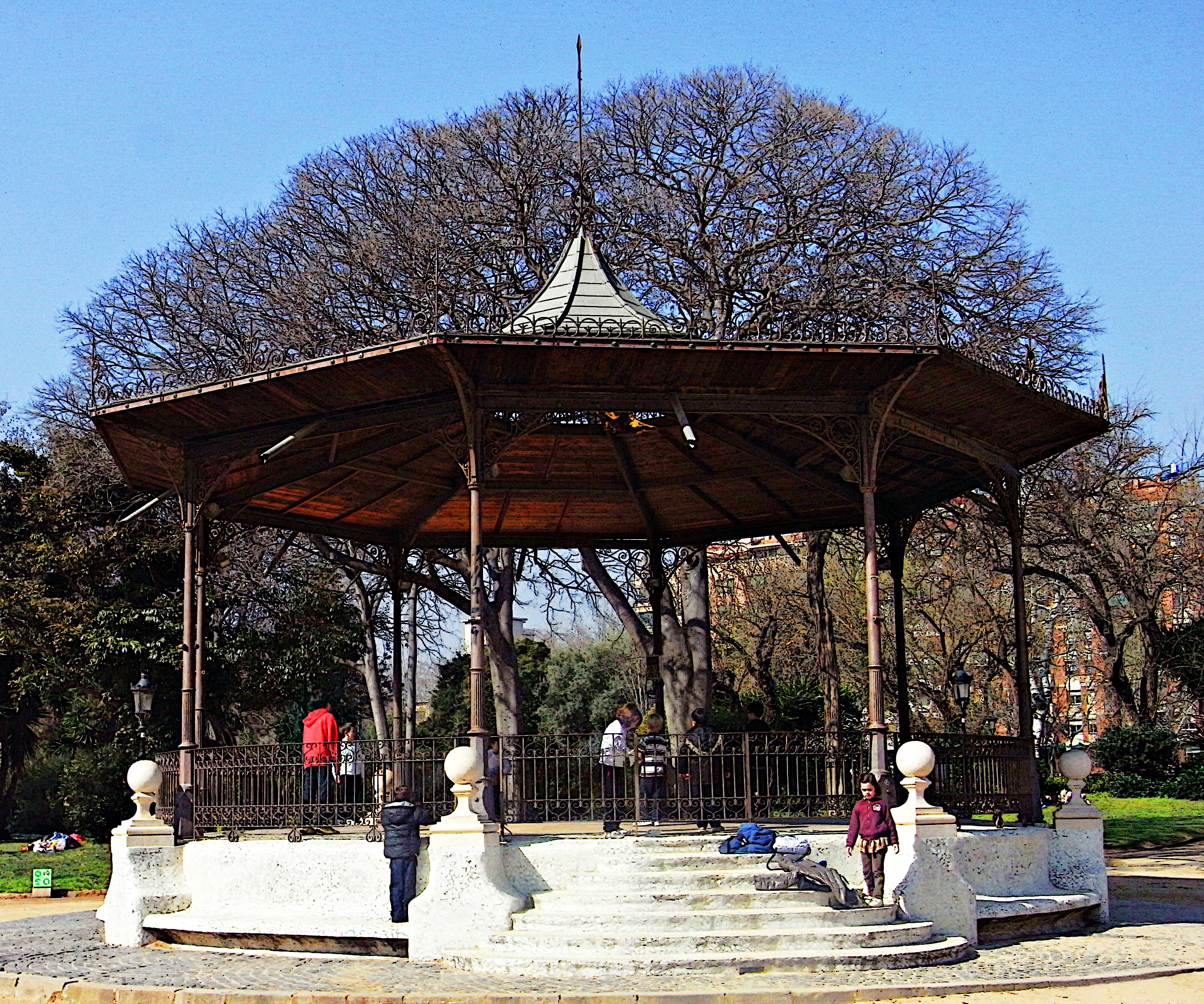
The bandstand where Sonia was murdered

Sonia and a friend, Doris Romero, were sleeping rough at a bandstand in Barcelona's Parc de la Ciutadella in the early hours of 6 October 1991 when they were abruptly attacked by a group of six teenage skinheads from the Boixos Nois, who beat them with a broomstick and repeatedly kicked them in the head while wearing steel-toe boots. Sonia was killed in the attack, while Doris was seriously injured and left unconscious. The perpetrators went on to attack three other people sleeping near the bandstand. One of the three other victims, Miguel Pérez Barreiros, was able to contact police after the attack, despite being left completely blind from his injuries. When police discovered Sonia's body, she was so badly bruised that media reports initially misidentified her as a black woman.

=== Investigation and trial ===
An investigation was launched by the Mossos d'Esquadra and became the force's first murder inquiry since its recent redeployment in Catalonia. Police treated the attack as a hate crime, even though Spanish criminal law at that time did not distinguish between crimes motivated by prejudice and others.

In March 1992, seven people were arrested and charged in connection with the murder: Pere Alsina Llinares, David Parladé Valdés, Héctor and Isaac López Frutos, Andrés Pascual Prieto, Oliver Sánchez Riera and Óscar Lozano. Police found weapons such as brass knuckles and baseball bats, as well as neo-Nazi and Boixos Nois paraphernalia in searches of their homes. The court in Barcelona found that the attackers were hostile to LGBTQ people and knew the bandstand was regularly used by LGBTQ people as a place to sleep.

In June 1994, six of the suspects were convicted of participating in the attack and given prison sentences ranging from 23 to 50 years, while the seventh, Lozano, was fined 100,000 pesetas for knowing of the murder and not reporting it. In 1996, the attackers' sentences were reduced by the Supreme Court of Spain. All six have since been released from prison.

== Aftermath ==
Her assassination has been deemed a "turning point" in the LGBTQ community in Catalonia in which awareness of neo-Nazi Skinheads groups like Boixos Nois became widespread.

In 1993, a plaque commemorating Rescalvo was installed on the bandstand where she was murdered. In 2013, the bandstand was officially renamed "Glorieta de la Transsexual Sònia" in her memory.

Further hommages took place specially in 2021 for the 30th anniversary of the event. "Plaça de Sonia Rescalvo Zafra" was added in the official city nomenclator as a 400 square meter area. In other municipalities like Molins de Rei naming of public spaces after Sonia took place. A yearly gathering takes place in this square organized by the city council and local LGBTQ rights organizations.
