= Murder of Dandara dos Santos =

2017 murder in Brazil

Coordinates: 3.79°S 38.60°W

On 15 February 2017, Dandara Kettley, (Note: Brazilian Portuguese pronunciation: [dɐ̃ˈdaɾɐ ˈkɛtʃilej]. According to an interview given by inspector Vitória Holanda to the website Tribuna do Ceará, the name "Dandara dos Santos" (pronounced [dɐ̃ˈdaɾɐ dus ˈsɐ̃tus]) does not exist and she believes it was "created to respect the gender or something like that.") a Brazilian travesti, was beaten and shot to death in Bom Jardim, a neighborhood in Fortaleza, Ceará. The crime received widespread attention when images of the beating were released on social media.

== Background ==
Dandara's murder occurred on 15 February 2017, in the Bom Jardim neighborhood, but only became public 16 days later, when two videos of the event began circulating on social media.

One of the videos shows Dandara alone, already injured and bleeding. She is sitting on a cemented area of the sidewalk with a yellow shirt in her hand, which she used to wipe away the blood. Other people incite further beatings, and she begs not to be hit anymore. Another video shows Dandara being tortured by three men for not being able to get into a wheelbarrow due to her condition. She was kicked and slapped in the head, and also hit with a sandal on the head and a piece of wood, while being insulted. At the end of the recording, five men come together to put Dandara in the wheelbarrow and take her to another location. Later, she was shot twice and hit hard in the head with a rock, dying from a traumatic brain injury.

== Investigation ==
The investigation into the case was coordinated by detectives Bruno Ronchi Vieira, from the 32nd Police District (32nd DP) of Bom Jardim, and Arlete Silveira, from the Child and Adolescent Police Station (DCA). After the murder gained widespread attention with the release of videos of the incident on the internet, Ronchi stated that those involved in the crime had been identified, but had not yet been arrested. He reported that the video of the assault was sent two days after the murder and that, in addition to the people appearing in the video, other criminals were identified as responsible for the crime. According to him, case was not being widely publicized so as not to hinder the investigations. The special coordinator of public policies for LGBTQ people, Narciso Júnior, told the O Povo Online portal that one of those involved was already in custody.

== Trials ==
On 30 November 2017, Judge Danielle Pontes de Arruda Pinheiro, of the 1st Jury Court of Fortaleza, announced the names of the five defendants who would face a jury trial for the crimes of aggravated homicide (vile (morally reprehensible) motive, cruelty, and use of means that prevented the victim's defense) and corruption of minors. The defendants' lawyers had requested the dismissal of the charges, arguing that they had not committed the homicide. Of the accused, only two were fugitives and one had been arrested for another crime. The teenagers were facing charges for offenses analogous to the crimes of aggravated homicide, criminal organization, and illegal possession of a firearm.

Both trials took place in the 1st Jury Room of the Clóvis Beviláqua Forum, in Fortaleza. The first trial was scheduled for 5 April 2018 and began at 09:46, lasting 14 hours and 45 minutes until the reading of the sentence, ending around 00:30 The defendants were heard separately during the morning and afternoon. Four of them confessed to the assaults, claiming that they did not intend to kill Dandara. The session had a break at 14:00. and resumed at 14:30, with the prosecution's statement, remaining until 16:30 The defendants' defense began presenting their arguments around 16:50.

The sentencing took place in the early hours of 6 April. The sentences were individualized according to each defendant's participation in the crime. Francisco José Monteiro de Oliveira Junior was sentenced to 21 years in prison for shooting Dandara. Jean Victor Silva Oliveira, Rafael Alves da Silva Paiva, and Francisco Gabriel dos Reis received 16-year sentences; the first for using the wooden board in the beating, the second for kicking the victim, and the third for the assaults with the sandal. The last defendant, Isaías da Silva Camurça, was sentenced to 14 years and 6 months for offensive words directed at Dandara. The defense attorneys for Jean and Rafael announced that they would appeal the decision, arguing that the sentences were excessive, justifying that the aggression they caused was not a factor in the victim's death. It was the first time in Brazilian courts that a judge mentioned, in the sentence, a base motive, specifically cited as transphobia, as an aggravating factor in homicide.

The sixth defendant, Júlio César Braga da Costa, was not tried along with the others because he had appealed to avoid a jury trial due to "lack of evidence," which was denied. His trial was subsequently scheduled for 23 October 2018, where he was tried for aggravated homicide (vile motive, cruel means, and use of a method that prevented the victim's defense) and corruption of minors. The trial was scheduled to begin at 09:30, but the start was postponed to 13:00 due to the absence of two defense witnesses—Dandara's brothers. Judge Danielle Pontes then ordered the coercive transport of the absent witnesses during this period. The jury trial began around 13:50.

After collecting testimonies from three people (one as a declarant and two as witnesses), the prosecution's case was heard, followed by the defense's case. The trial began only at 16:30. At 22:30, Judge Danielle Pontes read the sentence and condemned Júlio César Braga da Costa to 16 years of imprisonment in a closed regime for vile motive, cruel means, and a method that prevented the victim's defense—aggravating circumstances imposed in the indictment filed by the Public Prosecutor's Office. The defendant was acquitted of the charge of corruption of minors.

== Aftermath ==
The case became notorious after the images were released via Facebook. One of the images was released by the coordinator of Sexual Diversity of the Secretariat of Citizenship and Human Rights of Fortaleza, Paulo Diógenes, who also commented that it was "a fatality that authorities need to provide the necessary clarifications for!". In a statement released on the same social network, Governor of Ceará Camilo Santana expressed solidarity with Dandara's family and friends and judged the case as "repugnant and unacceptable", in addition to instructing the Secretary of Security to work with "total commitment to identify and punish each of the criminals".

On 10 March 2017, the Grupo de Resistência Asa Branca (Grab), together with the Fórum Cearense LGBT, and with the support of the Conselho Municipal LGBT, held an Act Against LGBTphobia in Luíza Távora Square in homage to Dandara and other LGBT people killed by discrimination. On 13 September 2017, the State Day of Combating Transphobia was instituted in the State of Ceará, with 15 February chosen as the date in homage to Dandara.

=== Book ===
Between October 2018 and January 2019, civil police officer Vitória Holanda wrote the book Casulo Dandara. A childhood friend of Dandara, Vitória took the initiative to publish the material because of comments on the internet that attributed to the travesti criminal factions or allegations that she sold drugs. The book narrates Dandara's trajectory from childhood to her death and the international repercussions of the crime. Until the month she finished the book, Vitória sought support from publishers to publish it. It was launched in August 2019, during the Ceará Book Biennial. She states:

No one becomes a police officer expecting to investigate the murder of someone they love. Discovering how it happened and who the perpetrators of Dandara's murder were was the most difficult task I received from fate in all my years as a police officer.

=== Sculpture in the US ===
On 14 December 2019, the day Dandara would have turned 45 years old, artist Rubem Robierb honored her with a sculpture in a square in Tribeca, Manhattan. Titled Dream Machine: Dandara, the work was scheduled to remain in New York until May 2020 before being permanently displayed in Miami. In a report to GloboNews, Rubem said that Dandara's family thanked him for the work, which, in a way, fulfilled her wish to one day be famous. The sculpture left Tribeca Park on 8 August 2020.

== See also ==
- LGBTQ rights in Ceará
- Discrimination against LGBTQ people in Brazil
- List of people killed for being transgender
