= Gisberta Salce Júnior =

Brazilian murder victim (1960–2006)

Gisberta Salce (1960–2006) was a Brazilian trans woman who was murdered in Porto, Portugal in 2006.

Salce grew up in Brazil, but left for France at the age of 18 to escape a wave of homicides against transgender people in São Paulo and ended up in Portugal two years later. In 2006 at the age of 45, she was physically and sexually assaulted over the course of several days by a group of boys ranging in age from 12 to 16. As a result of her murder and the subsequent investigation and trial, multiple controversies erupted over corruption and abuse at the Oficina de São José.

== Life ==
=== Early life ===
Angelina Muro Salce and Gisberto Salce, Gisberta's parents, had eight children. Gisberta was the youngest, and was named after her father, Gisberto. She was nicknamed "Júnior". She would later feminize her given name, from Gisberto to Gisberta.

According to her sister Jacine, 12 years her senior, she had “delicate, very white skin” and "really liked to dance". Jacine said that Salce regularly wore her sister's clothes and that she considered Gisberta to be her "toy doll." According to her sister, Salce "liked to play with the girls and we didn't care". While Salce was still a child, her mother expressed concern over her behavior. At some point, she was taken to a doctor and told that she was like that due to "excessive pampering". At the age of 14, after her father died, she told her mother that she “was going to be a woman”. Salce was known to wear girl's clothes when visiting friends; however, around her family, she opted for clothes that were more "gender neutral". At the age of 18, she decided to leave the country for France after news surfaced of homophobic discrimination and murders in Casa Verde, São Paulo.

She temporarily returned to Brazil for hormone replacement therapy, silicone breast implants and other feminizing procedures. She spent two years in France before moving to Portugal and settling in Porto.

=== In Portugal ===
Salce started doing stage performances at a bar named Invictus in the galleries of Hotel Malaposta, where Salce would hang out, which occupied a space formerly used by Kilt, one of the first gay bars in the city. From there, she moved on to stages at other bars, including Bustos and Syndicato. Salce, in her shows, often impersonated Marilyn Monroe. During the day, Salce enjoyed having coffee with her friends and walking her two Yorkshire Terriers around the city. Nuno Câmara Lima, a nurse who worked on a Espaço Pessoa project that “supported people who performed sex work”, some of whom also struggled with drug addiction or sexually transmitted infections, spent time with Salce. He had first met Salce during her first few years in the city, saying she was a "...very active in the trendy nightclubs in Porto, like Swing. She was a very beautiful woman. If I saw her on the street, she would be a woman with good makeup, nice clothes, nice shoes."

While living in Porto, Salce was known to engage in sex work on Rua de Santa Catarina, as she earned little money from her stage performances. At some point in 1996, she contracted an HIV infection, which had an adverse impact on her health and was complicated by her drug use. She began to frequent the social welfare associations Migalha de Amor and Espaço Pessoa to eat, bathe and talk. Upon learning of her HIV-positive status, Salce refused treatment.

At one point, Salce was treated at Hospital Joaquim Urbano over a 22 day period. Afterwards, she spent a week in a therapeutic community for rehabilitation in Setúbal, but left before being released.

=== Homelessness ===
After leaving the therapeutic community she began to consume “heavier” drugs. This led to the loss of her home and primary source of income.

“She started going to houses with lower and lower incomes, then she passed through several social districts, until she fell into that hole”, says Nuno Lima, referring to the tent that she set up in a building on Avenida Fernão de Magalhães. The disease (HIV) took away her livelihood: sex work.

Salce was “loved by all the nurses” and “showed pictures of her family, showed pictures of herself as a young girl, a girl”. In her 40s, she arrived at Espaço Pessoa, drank coffee, ate something, watched television, talked for a while, stayed for a few hours. "She would come at midnight and go to her corner."

They visited the space only after her death, in photographs, part of the material to report the events.

Salce was also supported by “Coração da Cidade”, the social department of “Migalha de Amor”. This association, founded by La Salete Correia dos Santos, offered dinner to about a thousand homeless people, and Salce was one of them.

=== Last months ===
At the end of 2005, three teenagers, Fernando, Ivo and Flávio started to get together to spray paint "graffiti" in an abandoned building in Porto, the same one Salce was living in a tent inside. Fernando's mother was a sex worker and the child was often left with a babysitter. Their house was frequented "by people associated with the nightlife of Porto" and it was precisely there that Fernando's mother and her son began to have a connection with Salce. Although contact was lost for some time between them, it was Fernando who later, at the age of 14, identified Salce in the abandoned building where he, along with his friends, were painting murals.

The three boys talked to her and, from there, began to visit her regularly. During these visits, Salce "told them about the health problems she suffered from", verbalized her weakness, AIDS, a syndrome "the external physical signs of which the boys were well aware of". From there, the three boys began to bring Salce some food. In addition, they even “cooked meals for her on the spot”, as stated in the process.

==== Disclosure of Gisberta Salce's existence ====
Fernando, Ivo and Flávio spoke of "a man who 'had breasts' and 'really looked like a woman'" to colleagues at Escola Augusto César Pires de Lima and Oficina de São José, an institution under the tutelage of the Catholic Church that hosted 11 of the 14 boys who would torture and kill Gisberta, that was eventually closed after several scandals related to sexual abuse and embezzlement, in addition to the suicide of a principal in the most critical phase of the trial. The three youngsters who first met Gisberta were then joined by eleven, who were eager to see Salce.

==== First aggressions ====
That building became a meeting point to attack the Brazilian immigrant. Not every one of the boys attacked her, nor did they all do so on the same day. But, as of February 15, 2006, the 14 youths had divided into groups and were in the building to attack Gisberta Salce.

In one of the first episodes, the boys noticed that Salce was inside the tent and one of them ordered her to get up and shouted: "Didn't I tell you that I didn't want you here?" Salce left the tent, while replying that she had nowhere to go. Flávio wielded a stone that he had picked up and threw it in the direction of the transgender woman, hitting her in the frontal region and in anterior part of the left parietal region of her skull.

Salce fell to the ground, bleeding. When she managed to get up a few minutes later, one of the boys, named David, jumped on her, which caused her to fall again. There, all the elements of the group, with the exception of Vítor Santos, threw themselves on Salce and together attacked her by kicking her and hitting her with sticks. Salce started to scream from the pain and the group ran away in fear of being caught by the security guards in the parking lot that was close to the building.

The initial group of three boys, who had before cooked rice for Gisberta in that same building, met the next day, on February 16, to now attack her there. When they arrived at her tent, they realized that Salce's illness had worsened due to the attacks of the previous day, preventing her even from standing up. Salce was lying on a mattress, shivering, spoke in an almost inaudible tone and had dried blood on her head. The three minors asked Salce if she wanted help, and she replied that she "just wanted a cigarette and to be left alone".

The three left and went to their classes, but were soon replaced by six from the group. José António told José Alexandre to undress “Gi” but he refused because Salce “smelled bad and had AIDS”. So the former teamed up with Jorge Ismael and together they busied themselves by throwing stones at the woman and hitting her on the knees and legs with sticks. Salce shouted and the group once again fled for a few moments.

They then returned to Salce, ordered her to get up again, and when she again told them that she couldn't, they assaulted her once more with sticks and kicks, according to the case file. Lying on the floor and unable to defend herself due to her physical weakness and the number of aggressors, Salce just curled up and covered herself with the blanket, shouting "don't do this, hooligans!" Not satisfied after this physical assault, the youngsters also destroyed Gisberta's tent before leaving.

=== Last days ===
==== February 18, 2006 ====
By 2:30pm, Gisberta Salce was outside her tent, lying on her side under a blanket, only her head uncovered. David, one of the six who had again agreed to go to the building to attack Salce, ordered Salce to get up. She replied that she couldn't do it “because she was in a very bad state”. He kicked her once more. "During the assaults, the victim cried convulsively, due to the pain she felt." Even so, “the boys continued to attack her in the same way”. David even grabbed a wooden beam about 1.5 meters long and 20 centimeters in diameter and dropped it on Gisberta's body, striking her at stomach level. This blow "caused great suffering", concluded the investigators of the case.

==== February 19, 2006 ====
Part of the group was about to continue their routine of violence when they came across Salce lying on the floor, dressed in a nightgown and naked from the waist down, completely still. They called her name, but Salce was unable to speak and just let out a very low moan. She was then touched on the legs with a stick but didn't move.

==== February 21, 2006 ====
A day passed and, on February 21, another part of the group returned. Salce was outside the tent, lying on some rocks, "with her legs curled up". On her legs were “scratches and eccymoses”. Salce was still naked from the waist down.

They thought Salce was dead due to the lack of an answer to their questions, the pale shade of her face and some "signs that she was not breathing, despite having placed the flame of a lighter next to her mouth". That day, they warned other members of the group that Salce had died.

The next day's meeting was now to "dispose of the body" - because they were scared they would be held responsible, and because "some of them thought that the victim was entitled to 'a funeral'". The possibility of burial was ruled out, as the boys lacked the tools to make a hole, and setting Gisberta on fire was also impossible as they feared that the smoke might attract the attention of someone, namely the car park security guards.

After some discussion, they chose to throw her into an existing well in the building, as it contained enough water to hide the victim. Then they agreed to collect all the sticks that had been used for the attacks and dispose of them in the same way.

==== Final day: February 22, 2006 ====
It was 8:30 when Ivo put on a woollen glove on his right hand, gave the other to José Alexandre, and Fernando wrapped his hands in a plastic bag. They rolled Salce up in blankets and transported her to the well, about 100 meters away.

The water line was about 10 meters from the surface. The three pushed her inside and Salce was submerged in the water. It was this act that caused her death: Gisberta Salce Júnior, a trans woman, Brazilian immigrant, sex worker and homeless person, who lived with HIV, was still alive at this time, and died by drowning, a fact confirmed by her autopsy report.

The group that killed Salce warned the rest of the members that everything had been resolved. The information was passed on to Flávio and from him to the rest of the world: when he returned to school, Flávio told his Civic Education teacher about everything that had happened, because he “couldn't take it anymore”.

The teacher later confirmed in court that both Flávio and Ivo were “very pale” and that “when Fernando also confirmed what had happened, he cried a lot”. It was Flávio who gave the authorities the exact location of the well. The agents followed his directions, and the corpse was retrieved at 6:50pm.

=== Homicide Process ===
Thus began six months of investigation and trial, which involved more than just a group of kids and a trans woman. Scandals at Oficina de São José entered the process, LGBT associations were involved and it all appeared on newspapers.

The news of her death (and the systematic assaults prior) aroused in the technicians a feeling of responsibility for what had happened.

The authorities seized several objects at the scene. Among them were:

- A yellow blanket
- A blue knitted sweater
- Pieces of newspaper
- Empty drink containers
- A black shoe
- Various condoms
- Parlodel 2.5 mg tablets
- A comb
- An eyeliner
- Two lipsticks
- A user card from the institution “Coração da Cidade” with the number 132
- A prescription from Hospital Joaquim Urbano

==== Autopsy ====
The autopsy confirmed injuries to the head, neck, lower and upper limbs, larynx and trachea, abdomen, intestines and kidneys; multiple ecchymoses, hemorrhagic infiltrations, excoriations and blood infiltrations.

==== Sentences ====
===== Vitor Santos =====
Vítor Santos was the oldest in the group and the only one at 16 years old. Since he had already reached the age of criminal responsibility, which is 16 in Portugal, the process went to Criminal Courts and he was tried as an adult. He was sentenced to eight months in prison for committing the crime of omission of aid, since everyone confirmed that Santos did not attack Salce. He did, however, take the position of observer of events several times.

In a first phase, the other 13 minors were held responsible for the “committing a crime of aggravated murder, of attempted form and with possible intent”. But, as the autopsy found drowning to be the cause of death and not aggression, eleven of these boys were charged with qualified bodily harm and the remaining two were only charged with the crime of omission of aid. The measures applied also differed: the former eleven were admitted to an Educational Center for between 11 and 13 months, and the remaining two were charged with the tutelary measure of educational follow-up for 12 months. Between July and September 2007, they were free.

===== José António =====
After being heard by the court, José António's mother described her son as "an affable young man", always "well behaved". Experts found “flaws” in his emotional expressiveness and difficulties in dealing with emotions.

After serving time at the Educational Center, José António returned to his mother's house, on the south bank of the Tagus. The incident was never talked about at home again.

===== Rodolfo =====
After the trial that ended the case, Rodolfo fulfilled the internment measure at the educational center and kept in touch with his family. In an initial phase, the grandfather adopted an “excusing” attitude towards his grandson and showed a critical attitude towards the rules of the institution.

===== Fernando =====
During the sessions, the boy's mother confirmed the acquaintance and assured that Fernando “always dealt with Gisberta's differences with no problem”. She said that her son did not tell her that he had found the woman again, but "she had noticed that sometimes some food went missing at home". The mother stressed that her son “never managed to give her an explanation for what had happened”.

Fernando went to his mother's house when he finished serving time.

== Legacy ==
Gisberta Salce was then seen as a symbol of multiple discrimination: she was a trans woman, Brazilian immigrant, sex worker, homeless person and a person living with HIV, simultaneously. The violence she suffered was adopted by LGBT associations as an example of prejudice.

=== Marcha do Orgulho LGBT do Porto ===
This event that had its genesis with the brutal death of Gisberta Salce Júnior, in 2006, has been increasing its participants with each edition.

The march started in Praça 24 de Agosto to July 2006, a place chosen to remember the trans woman murdered by a group of minors, who started the same week of the march to be tried in Porto.

"We want to remember Gisberta and all the Gisbertas in this country, as well as all the abused, murdered children, thrown into the river, those who disappear and women raped by their husbands, because this action was organized in defense of human rights," said João Paulo, of the organization and the Portugal Gay association. In honor of Salce, bouquets of flowers were deposited at the place where she was found dead.

Many of the protesters sported pictures of Salce and others displayed banners where messages such as "I am a transsexual and I do not want to be murdered", "I am not ashamed, I have reasons" and "Educating without discrimination", among others.

At the end of the march, a manifest was read and distributed with the demands of the organizers of the initiative. The demands included a restructuring of the protection system for minors at risk in Portugal and the inclusion of gender identity in anti-discriminatory legislation and protection in criminal legislation against hate crimes motivated by transphobia.

=== Inspiration for artists ===
The case has inspired artists.

==== Poem "Indulgência Plenária" ====
A year after the events, Alberto Pimenta published “Indulgência Plenária”, a poem in the form of elegy that evokes the figure of Gisberta Salce.

==== "Balada de Gisberta" ====
That year, Pedro Abrunhosa composed “Balada de Gisberta”, which he included in the album Luz. Later, Maria Bethânia interpreted this song, closing with her the first act of her show Amor Festa Devoção (2009).

==== Short-film "A Gis" ====
Thiago Carvalhaes dedicated a short film, “A Gis”, in 2016. "What got me involved first was the song, 'Balada de Gisberta', composed by Pedro Abrunhosa, in the version sung by Maria Betânia", revealed Carvalhaes. “I wanted to know more. The information was scarce, difficult to find. "Some were wrong”, he continues. The fact that Brazil is one of the countries that have the most cases of violence against transgender people has only helped to increase his “indignation”.

==== Gisberta Salce in the theatrical world ====
The same interpretation by Maria Betânia awoke the actor Luis Lobianco. The play “Gisberta”, with text by Rafael Souza-Ribeiro and staging by Renato Carrera, was on stage on 27 and 28 November 2018 at Teatro Sá da Bandeira, in Porto, and on 4,5 and 6 December 2018 at the Tivoli Theater in Lisbon.

In a short exchange of messages with Ípsilon, the production director for that show, Cláudia Marques, speaks of “indignation”, but also of “hope for change”. "Brazil lives in dark days, when setbacks threaten historical conquests and threaten individual freedoms", she comments. “I believe in the theater because it is an agent of resistance and transformation. Through Gis's story, I believe that we can speak to the public about respect for diversity and life.”

There was a theatrical show in Portugal before. Inventing a mother, Eduardo Gaspar first wrote a short version of the monologue “Gisberta” for actress Rita Ribeiro, who in 2013 sold out Teatro Rápido. He later made a longer version, which debuted in Funchal the following year.

==== Pão de Açúcar ====
Pão de Açúcar, the second novel by Afonso Reis Cabral, is fiction that springs from reality, the death of Gisberta Salce Júnior. Starting from a research work, he invents the perspective of one of the 14 boys who assaulted the trans woman in 2006.

In 2016, several media outlets tried to mark the tenth anniversary of that death, which paved the way for the fight for the right to gender identity in Portugal. When confronted with that crime again, Afonso Reis Cabral realized that his second novel was there.

=== #AnoGisberta ===
The Ação pela Identidade defined 2016 as the #AnoGisberta, regarding the 10 years of the death of the trans woman. There were posters scattered around Lisbon with the image of the woman and an exhibition of works at Maus Hábitos, in Porto, and a debate at the Confraria Vermelha Livraria de Mulheres on invisibility and transphobia, also in Porto.

=== Centro Gis ===
The Centro Gis, responding to LGBTI populations (Lesbian, Gay, Bisexual, Trans and Intersex) created by Associação Plano i, opened in 2017, pays homage to Gisberta Salce Júnior, with her name.

=== Street Gisberta Salce Júnior ===
In May 2024, a street in Porto’s Bonfim neighborhood was named after Gisberta Salce Junior, following years of advocacy. While the Toponymy Commission initially rejected similar proposals in 2010 and 2020, a renewed petition narrowly passed in October 2023 and was subsequently approved unanimously by the Porto City Council in January 2024.

Efforts to honor Gisberta Salce by naming a street after her began in 2010 with the “Viver a Rua” project, part of FITEI, the International Festival of Iberian Expression Theater. Participants were asked to submit a list of ten individuals they felt should be commemorated in Porto's street names, and Gisberta’s name was the most frequently mentioned. The project organizers submitted a petition to the Toponymy Commission, but received no response. Nine years later, actress Sara Barros Leitão led a similar initiative, encouraging audiences of her show Todos Os Dias Me Sujo De Coisas Eternas to sign a new petition. Submitted in March 2020, this petition also received no response, and it was later disclosed that both proposals had been rejected by the commission.
