= Boixos Nois =

Ultras supporter group of FC Barcelona

- The logo of Els Boixos Nois
- Established: 7 July 1981; 45 years ago
- Type: Supporters' group, Ultras group
- Club: FC Barcelona
- Location: Spain
- Coordinates: 41.396556°N 2.160094°E
- Website: boixosnois.com

The Boixos Nois (Catalan: [ˈbɔʃuz ˈnɔjs]; "Crazy Boys", from the Catalan word "Bojos" meaning crazy) is an ultras supporter group organised around the La Liga football club FC Barcelona, based in Catalonia and founded in 1981. During the 1980s the group's political position shifted. For many years, the Boixos Nois enjoyed a close relationship with FC Barcelona until president Joan Laporta banned their presence at games in 2003.

They are notorious in Spain for their violent behaviour and frequent clashes with authorities, with some members being convicted for death threats, murder, illegal firearms possession, extortion and drug trafficking.

== Name ==
"Boixos Nois" literally translates as "crazy boys" or "mad boys" in English. The name intentionally uses the nonstandard spelling boixos instead of the correct Catalan plural bojos (singular: boig [bɔtʃ]), changing the pronunciation from [ˈbɔʒus] to [ˈbɔʃus]. The second word, nois, simply means "boys" in Catalan.

== History ==
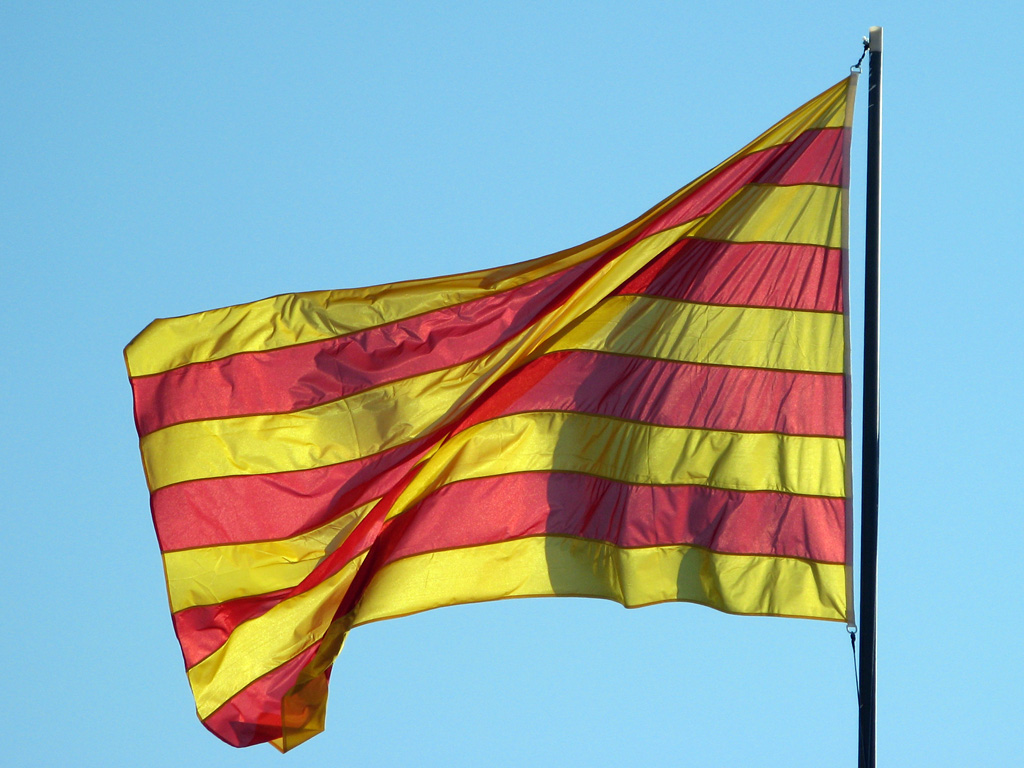
The Senyera, often waved during matches by the Boixos Nois as a symbol of Catalan nationalism.

Founded in 1981, the Boixos is a penya (Catalan), a Catalan mix between a financial support group and a fan club; where financial, political and social support are mixed. The Boixos Nois penya started as a small group of no more than 50 young fans, who strongly identified with pro-independence Catalan nationalism and left-wing socialism. They repeatedly demanded the resignation of president Josep Núñez, who they saw as authoritarian, and openly defied his presidency through chants and banners on matches.

In the following years, the city of Barcelona experienced an eruption in skinheads, who identified with right-wing separatism. The skinheads joined the Boixos Nois and slowly moved their political ideology from social-liberalism to fascism, causing factions within the group. Inspired by British hooligans, the remaining Boixos Nois became violent, causing havoc leading to mass-scale arrests. By now a mix of supporters of anti-independence neo-fascists and of Catalan independence Boixos Nois featured prominently in racist violence. They had an alliance with Frente Atletico, but that ended with the rise of Catalonian separatism.

They have also had disputes with fellow Barcelona supporters group the Penya Almogàvers, who support Catalan independence, but are also, anti-fascist and non-violent with liberal, social democratic and democratic socialism ideologies; contrasting with the position taken by Boixos Nois.

The groups began to gain a sharp rise in membership and the ties between the club and Boixos began to grow. The club gave the group free tickets to matches, transportation facilities and storage room for their banners at the stadium, Camp Nou.

In 1985 after the Heysel disaster, where 39 people died due to hooligan riots and a collapsing wall, the Boixos Nois raised a banner at the Camp Nou South-end with the text "¡Gracias Liverpool!" (Thanks Liverpool!) and replaced the traditional Catalan flag, the Senyera, with a swastika. The former president Núñez reacted by relocating the group to the third tier of Camp Nou. The Boixos responded by adopting a slogan of no-violence inside the stadium, but insisted on maintaining freedom outside. The promises worked and they were subsequently moved back to the southern goal.

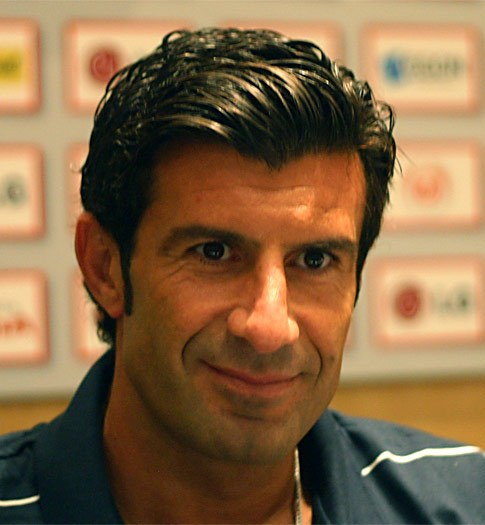
Luís Figo's transfer to Real Madrid turned him from the group's most beloved person to the most hated.

Increasingly violent, the Boixos was the center of several controversies in 1991: On 22 August a member of the Boixos murdered Frederic Rouquier, a supporter of the rival team Espanyol, and was sentenced to 26 years in jail. The same year, an investigation began into the murder of Sonia Rescalvo Zafra on 6 October. The events, widely reported in the Spanish media, created a sense of fear among the general public, mainly because of the supposed irrationality of the acts.

Several acts were taken by the Spanish government to alleviate the issues regarding Boixos Nois and other support groups in the country. A Royal decree created the "Comisión Nacional Contra la Violencia en Espectáculos Deportivos" (National Commission against Violence at Sporting Events), with the task of investigating violence in Spanish football and imposing penalties on fans or clubs. Coming to no binding solution, the commission decreed the "urgent necessity for clubs to give no direct or indirect support to groups which do not have associative status". Having little effect on the problem of fan behaviour at matches, the demand from UEFA in 1993 to install all-seater stadiums saw the Boixos' freedom reduced, as it obstructed the active involvement they regarded as essential to their activities.

According to a protest organisation, formed in part by Joan Laporta, L'Elephant Blau, the former president Núñez promoted the emergence of skinheads among the Boixos and gave them permission to roam freely around the stadium, using them for his own political gain. When Núñez resigned in 2000, his vice-president Gaspart took over as president. Gaspart publicly expressed his sympathies for Boixos Nois, claiming that he would join the group as soon as he resigned as chairman. The comment caused the Boixos Nois members to occasionally be referred to as 'the chairman's boys'.

The same year saw the controversial transfer of the Barcelona vice-captain Luís Figo to arch-rivals Real Madrid. When Figo returned with Real Madrid to Camp Nou in November 2002 the Boixos responded to the perceived treachery by whistling and jeering whenever he went near the ball. The abuse peaked when the Boixos threw a cut-off pig's head next to Figo, while he was taking a corner. The match was suspended for 13 minutes by the referee, who took the players off the pitch because of fears for their safety. It ended in a 0–0 draw.

When Joan Laporta won the presidential election in 2003 he ran against the Jewish front-runner Lluis Bassat after Bassat's campaign was subject to widespread harassment from the Boixos Nois, including frequent shouts of "Fucking Jew". After Laporta won the election he banned the group from matches and withdrew their earlier privileges at the club. The Boixos reacted by painting death threats on the walls of his house and in February 2004 two Boixos attacked him as he left the house. Later that year, a Police phone tap in March revealed a security guard of Camp Nou saying that "there is money for anyone who wants to give Laporta a good hiding".

== Current issues ==
Though formally banned from Camp Nou, the Boixos still attend matches where they now gather behind the northern goal. They have traditionally had a mixed social composition. In 2010, various members of the far-right Spanish ultranationalist Casuals FCB, the most violent faction of the group were arrested in seven Spanish cities with the charge of stealing drugs from Moroccan and Colombian drug traffickers with the intent of reselling them. Their members were released because the court didn't have evidence of their wrongdoings. In 2014, members of Boixos Nois stabbed two PSG supporters and heated up the debate about eradicating Ultras in Spain that rose in December of that year.

The main ideology in the group is far-right Spanish and Catalan ultranationalism, as well as anti-communism. They are allied with United Family, a Real Betis ultra group.

== See also ==
- Football hooliganism
- Supporters of FC Barcelona
- FC Barcelona
