= Brandon Teena =

American murder victim (1972–1993)

- Born: December 12, 1972; Lincoln, Nebraska, U.S.
- Died: December 31, 1993 (aged 21); Humboldt, Nebraska, U.S.
- Cause of death: Murder by gunshots and stabbing
- Other name: Billy Brinson
- Known for: Hate crime and mass murder victim

Brandon Teena (Note: Since "Brandon Teena" was never his legal name, it is uncertain the extent to which this name was used before his death. Stacey D'Erasmo of Out stated that Teena did not call himself "Brandon Teena". It is the name most commonly used by the press and other media. Other names may include his legal name, as well as "Billy Brenson" and "Teena Ray".) (December 12, 1972 – December 31, 1993) was an American transgender man who was murdered, along with Phillip DeVine and Lisa Lambert, in Humboldt, Nebraska, by John Lotter and Tom Nissen, in what would become known as the Humboldt Murders. His life and death are the subject of the films The Brandon Teena Story and Boys Don't Cry. The murders (specifically Teena's), along with that of Matthew Shepard nearly five years later, led to increased lobbying for hate crime laws in the United States.

== Life ==
Brandon Teena was born on December 12, 1972, in Lincoln, Nebraska, to JoAnn Brandon. His father died in a car accident in Lancaster County eight months before he was born, and he was raised by his mother. Teena and his older sister Tammy lived with their maternal grandmother in Lincoln, before they were reclaimed by their mother when he was three years old and Tammy was six. The family resided in the Pine Acre Mobile Home Park in northeast Lincoln. JoAnn received disability checks and worked as a clerk in a women's retail store in Lincoln to support the family. As young children, both siblings were sexually abused by their uncle for several years, and Teena sought counseling for this in 1991. JoAnn remarried in 1975, divorcing in 1980. Teena's family described him as being a tomboy since early childhood; he began identifying as male during adolescence and dated a female student during this period. His mother rejected his male identity and continued referring to him as her daughter. On several occasions, he claimed to be intersex.

Teena and his sister attended St. Mary's Elementary School and Pius X High School in Lincoln, where some remembered him as being socially awkward. During his second year, he rejected Christianity after he protested to a priest at Pius X regarding Christian views on abstinence and homosexuality. He also began rebelling at school by violating the school dress-code policy to dress in a more masculine fashion. During the first semester of his senior year, a U.S. Army recruiter visited the high school, encouraging students to enlist in the armed forces. Teena enlisted in the United States Army shortly after his eighteenth birthday and hoped to serve a tour of duty in Operation Desert Shield. However, he failed the written entrance exam by listing his sex as male.

In December 1990, Teena went to Holiday Skate Park with his friends, binding his chest to pass as male. In the months nearing his high school graduation, he became unusually outgoing and was remembered by classmates as a "class clown." He also began skipping school and receiving failing grades. He was expelled from Pius X High School in June 1991, three days before graduation.

In mid-1991, Teena began his first serious relationship, with a girl named Heather. Shortly after, he secured employment as a gas station attendant in an attempt to secure funds to purchase a trailer home for himself and his girlfriend. However, his mother disapproved of the relationship and convinced her daughter Tammy to follow Teena to determine whether his relationship with Heather was platonic or sexual.

In January 1992, Teena underwent a psychiatric evaluation, which concluded that he had a severe "sexual identity crisis". He was later taken to the Lancaster County Crisis Center to ensure that he was not suicidal. He was released from the center three days later and began attending therapy sessions, sometimes accompanied by his mother or sister. He was reluctant to discuss his sexuality during these sessions but revealed that he had been raped. The sessions ended after two weeks.

In 1993, after some legal trouble, Teena moved to the Falls City region of Richardson County, Nebraska, where he presented as a man. He became friends with several residents. After moving into the home of Lisa Lambert, Teena began dating Lambert's friend, 19-year-old Lana Tisdel, and began associating with ex-convicts and his eventual murderers John L. Lotter (born May 31, 1971) and Marvin Thomas "Tom" Nissen (born October 22, 1971).

On December 19, 1993, Teena was arrested for forging checks; Tisdel used money from her father to pay his bail. Because Teena was in the female section of the jail, Tisdel learned that he was transgender. When Tisdel later questioned him about his gender, he told her he was a hermaphrodite pursuing a sex change operation, and they continued dating. In a lawsuit regarding the film adaptation Boys Don't Cry, this was disputed by Tisdel. Teena's arrest was posted in the local paper under his birth name and thereupon his acquaintances learned that he was assigned female at birth.

== The Humboldt murders ==
During a Christmas Eve party, Nissen and Lotter grabbed Teena and forced him to remove his pants, proving to Tisdel that he had a vulva. Tisdel looked only when forced to and said nothing. Lotter and Nissen later assaulted Teena and forced him into a car. They drove to an area by a meat-packing plant in Richardson County, where they assaulted and gang-raped him. They then returned to Nissen's home, where Teena was ordered to take a shower. He escaped from Nissen's bathroom by climbing out the window and going to Tisdel's house. He was convinced by Tisdel to file a police report, though Nissen and Lotter had warned Teena they would kill him if he did so. Teena also went to the emergency room, where a standard rape kit was assembled but later lost. Sheriff Charles B. Laux questioned Teena about the rape. Reportedly, he seemed especially interested in his transgender status, to the point that Teena found his questions rude and unnecessary and refused to answer. Nissen and Lotter were taken in for police questioning. Despite ample evidence, Laux neglected to arrest and charge Nissen and Lotter, and Laux told them both a rape had been reported. Laux declined to have them arrested because, "What kind of a person was she? The first few times we arrested her, she was putting herself off as a guy." Teena's mother later filed a wrongful death suit, where the Nebraska Supreme Court found Laux's inaction resulted in Teena's death (see § Cultural and legal legacy for more information).

Around 1:00 a.m. on December 31, 1993, Nissen and Lotter drove to Lambert's house and broke in. They found Lambert in bed and demanded to know where Teena was. Lambert refused to tell them. Nissen searched and found him hiding under a blanket at the foot of the bed. The men asked Lambert if there was anyone else in the house, and she replied that Phillip DeVine, who at the time was dating Tisdel's sister, was staying with her. The duo then shot Teena in the stomach. Nissen testified in court that he had noticed that Teena was twitching, and asked Lotter for a knife, with which Nissen stabbed Teena in the chest, to ensure that he was dead. Nissen later testified that he shot Lambert in the stomach. After leaving the room to find DeVine, and then returning with him, Nissen shot Lambert a second time. The two men then took DeVine into the living room, sat him on the couch, and shot him twice. Nissen then returned to the bedroom where he shot Lambert a few more times. The two men then left, threw their weapons and gloves onto a frozen river, and returned to Falls City. They were arrested that afternoon, after which Nissen told deputies that he had witnessed John Lotter shoot three people to death in Humboldt. Police went to the river, where they retrieved the gloves and weapons, including the knife's sheath marked with Lotter's name, tying them to the crime.

Brandon Teena is buried in Lincoln Memorial Cemetery in Lincoln, Nebraska. His headstone is inscribed with his deadname and the epitaph daughter, sister, & friend.

Mugshot of John Lotter

Mugshot of Thomas Nissen

Nissen accused Lotter of committing the murders. In exchange for a reduced sentence, Nissen admitted to being an accessory to the rape and murder. Nissen testified against Lotter and was sentenced to life in prison. Lotter denied the veracity of Nissen's testimony, and his testimony was discredited. The jury found Lotter guilty of murder and sentenced him to death. Lotter and Nissen both appealed their convictions. In September 2007, Nissen recanted his testimony against Lotter. He claimed that he was the only one to shoot Teena and that Lotter had not committed the murders. In 2009, Lotter's appeal, using Nissen's new testimony to assert a claim of innocence, was rejected by the Nebraska Supreme Court, which held that since—even under Nissen's revised testimony—both Lotter and Nissen were involved in the murder, the specific identity of the shooter was legally irrelevant. In August 2011, a three-judge panel of the United States Court of Appeals for the Eighth Circuit rejected John Lotter's appeal in a split decision. In October 2011, the Eighth Circuit rejected Lotter's request for a rehearing by the panel or the full Eighth Circuit en banc. Lotter next petitioned the Supreme Court of the United States for a review of his case. The Supreme Court declined to review Lotter's case, denying his petition for writ of certiorari on March 19, 2012, and a further petition for rehearing on April 23, 2012, leaving his conviction to stand. On January 22, 2018, Lotter was denied a third appeal by the U.S. Supreme Court.

== Cultural and legal legacy ==
Because Teena had neither commenced hormone replacement therapy nor had gender confirmation surgery, he has sometimes mistakenly been identified as a lesbian by media reporters. However, some reported Teena's plans to have sex reassignment surgery.

Following Lotter's sentencing in February 1996, Saturday Night Live aired a segment in which comedian Norm Macdonald joked:

And finally, in Falls City, Nebraska, John Lotter has been sentenced to death for attempting to kill three people in what prosecutors called a plot to silence a cross-dressing female who had accused him of rape. Now, this might strike some viewers as harsh, but I believe everyone involved in this story should die.

The comments were met with sharp criticism from trans and queer communities and organizations including The Transexual Menace, who threatened to picket SNL in the absence of an apology. Upon reviewing the show, NBC agreed the line was inappropriate and should not have aired, and said it would ensure that similar incidents would not happen in the future.

JoAnn Brandon sued Richardson County and Sheriff Laux for failing to prevent Teena's death and being an indirect cause. She won the case, which was heard in September 1999 in Falls City, and was awarded $80,000. District court judge Orville Coady reduced the amount by 85 percent based on the responsibility of Nissen and Lotter and by one percent for Brandon's alleged contributory negligence. This led to a remaining judgment of responsibility against Richardson County and Laux of $17,360.97. In 2001, the Nebraska Supreme Court reversed the reductions of the earlier award reinstating the full $80,000 award for "mental suffering", plus $6,223.20 for funeral costs. In October 2001, the same judge awarded the plaintiff an additional $12,000: $5,000 for wrongful death, and $7,000 for the intentional infliction of emotional distress. Laux was also criticized after the murder for his attitude toward Teena – at one point, Laux referred to Teena as "it." After the case was over, Laux served as commissioner of Richardson County and later as part of his community's council before retiring as a school bus driver. He refused to speak about his actions in the case and called one reporter who contacted him for a story on the murder's twentieth anniversary "a pain in the ass". Sheriff Laux died on March 30, 2021 at the age of 73.

In 1999, Teena became the subject of a biographical film entitled Boys Don't Cry, directed by Kimberly Peirce and starring Hilary Swank as Teena and Chloë Sevigny as Tisdel. For their performances, Swank won, and Sevigny was nominated for an Academy Award. Tisdel sued the film's producers for unauthorized use of her name and likeness before the film's release. She claimed the film depicted her as "lazy, white trash, and a skanky snake". Tisdel also claimed that the film falsely portrayed that she continued the relationship with Teena after discovering that he was transgender. She eventually settled her lawsuit against the movie's distributor for an undisclosed sum.

JoAnn Brandon publicly objected to the media referring to her child as "he" and "Brandon." Following Hilary Swank's Oscar acceptance speech, JoAnn Brandon took offense at Swank for thanking "Brandon Teena" and referring to him as a man. "That set me off," said JoAnn Brandon. "She should not stand up there and thank my child. I get tired of people taking credit for what they don't know." However, in 2013, JoAnn told a reporter that she accepted Teena being referred to as transgender in the media. Although she was unhappy with how Boys Don't Cry portrayed the situation, she said about the film, "It gave them [gay and transgender advocates] a platform to voice their opinions, and I'm glad of that. There were a lot of people who didn't understand what it was [Teena] was going through ... We've come a long way". When asked how the murder affects her life today, JoAnn replied, "I wonder about how my life would be different if she was still here with me. She would be such a joy to have around. She was always such a happy kid. I imagine her being a happy adult," adding she would accept Teena living as a man.

Brandon, an interactive web artwork created in 1998 by Shu Lea Cheang, was named for Brandon Teena. The artwork was commissioned by the Solomon R. Guggenheim Museum. Much of the site's content relates to Brandon's story.

The Vancouver-based pop-punk band Hotel Mira released the song "Brandon", off their debut 2014 album Circulation, in memory of Brandon Teena.

In 2018, Donna Minkowitz, the journalist whose reporting on Teena's murder first brought the story to a wider audience, wrote a piece for the Village Voice in which she expressed her regret for not understanding transgender people when she wrote her original report.

== See also ==
- Capital punishment in Nebraska
- Corrective rape
- Trans bashing
- Transphobia
- History of transgender people in the United States
- History of violence against LGBT people in the United States
- Transgender Day of Remembrance
- List of people killed for being transgender
- Murder of Gwen Araujo
- Murder of Brianna Ghey
- Discrimination against transgender men
