= Murder of Gwen Araujo =

2002 murder of trans girl in California

- Gwen Araujo
- Location: Newark, California, U.S.
- Date: October 3, 2002
- Attack type: Murder by strangulation, battery
- Weapon: Multiple
- Victims: Gwen Amber Rose Araujo, aged 17
- Perpetrator: Jason Cazares, aged 22; Michael Magidson, aged 22; José Merel, aged 22; Jaron Nabors, aged 19
- Motive: Revenge against Araujo for not disclosing she was transgender
- Verdict: Nabors: Pleaded guilty Cazares, Magidson, Merel: First trial: Mistrial; Second trial: All not guilty of first-degree murder; Magidson, Merel guilty on the lesser included offense of second-degree murder; Hung jury on Cazares's charge of second-degree murder, guilty of voluntary manslaughter; All not guilty of hate crime enhancement
- Convictions: Magidson, Merel: Second-degree murder Nabors, Cazares: Voluntary manslaughter

Gwen Amber Rose Araujo (February 24, 1985 – October 4, 2002) was an American teenager who was murdered in Newark, California, at the age of 17. She was murdered by four men who beat and strangled her after discovering that she was transgender. Two of the defendants were convicted of second-degree murder, but not the requested hate-crime enhancements to the charges. The other two defendants pleaded guilty or no-contest to voluntary manslaughter. In at least one of the trials, a "trans panic defense"—an extension of the gay panic defense—was employed. Under California law at the time of the murder, the sexual intimacy by Magidson and Merel, both 22 years of age, with Gwen Araujo was statutory rape.

Merel and Magidson were sentenced to life imprisonment with the possibility of parole after 15 years. Merel was granted early parole in 2016, after reportedly showing extensive remorse to Araujo's mother, who supported the decision. Magidson, however, has reportedly never shown remorse and has been denied parole three times since his sentencing.

== Victim ==
Gwen Araujo was born on February 24, 1985, in Brawley, California, to Edward Araujo and Sylvia Guerrero. Her parents divorced when she was 10 months old.

Araujo came out as transgender in 1999 at the age of 14, and began using the name Gwen after her favorite musician, Gwen Stefani, but also went by Wendy and Lida. She began to grow her hair long and planned to undergo hormone treatment and surgery. Her older sister said that she was bullied in junior high school because of her voice and bearing. She transferred to an alternative high school, but did not return for the 2002–03 academic year.

== Background ==
Araujo first met Michael Magidson, José Merel, Jaron Nabors, and Jason Cazares in late August or early September 2002. The night they met Araujo, she flirted with all four men and they smoked marijuana together. After she left, Nabors asked the other three, "Could this be a dude?", but none of the four men took the thought seriously. Later, she engaged in oral sex with Magidson and anal sex with Merel. She claimed to be menstruating and, during sex, would push her partners' hands away from her genitalia to prevent them from discovering that she had a penis.

Nicole Brown, who was dating Paul Merel (José's older brother) and was acquainted with Araujo, said that she and Araujo had engaged in a physical fight after Brown challenged Araujo to strip for the men. Araujo surprised her with a strong blow during the fight, and Brown said the men "were tripping, because she was smaller than me and just as strong. She fought like a guy." The four men debated in late September whether Araujo was female, concluding that "something bad could happen" to her if she was not.

=== Confrontation ===
On the night of October 3, 2002, Araujo attended a party at a house rented by José and Paul Merel, attended by them, their younger brother Emmanuel Merel, Michael Magidson, Jaron Nabors, Jason Cazares, and Nicole Brown. Nabors later testified that José Merel said that night, "I swear, if it's a f— man, I'm gonna kill him. If it's a man, she ain't gonna leave." According to Nabors, Magidson added "I don't know what I'm going to do", and Nabors replied, "Whatever you do, make sure you don't make a mess." Brown said the four men were out at a club together and did not return to the house until after midnight.

In the early morning hours of October 4, Magidson asked Araujo to reveal her sex or allow him to touch her genitals, which she refused. Brown suggested that one of them should inspect Araujo, and Magidson took Araujo to the bathroom. After half an hour, during which José Merel later confessed he had sex with Araujo, Brown went to the bathroom, where she discovered Araujo had male genitalia during a forced inspection. Brown was surprised and blurted out, "It's a f— man!", and the men with whom she had had sexual relations became enraged and violent. Brown testified that she warned Araujo that the men were "very angry", but upon exiting through the front door, Araujo was confronted and forced back inside the house by Magidson, Nabors, and Cazares. Emmanuel Merel testified that he also tried to escort Araujo away from the house, but was prevented by Magidson and Nabors.

José Merel vomited upon learning Araujo had male genitalia, then began to cry in disbelief, saying "I can't be f— gay." Brown testified that she tried to comfort Merel after the discovery, saying "It's not your fault. I went to high school with you, and you were on the football team. Any woman that knows you after this, it's not going to matter. Just let her go."

After Araujo was brought back into the house, Magidson grabbed at her skirt and underwear in an attempt to expose her genitals. He then proceeded to punch her in the face, knocking her to the ground, and put her in a chokehold, but he was pulled off by others. Araujo begged the men to stop, saying "No, please don't. I have a family." José Merel became angry and struck her in the head with a can of food, denting the can and opening a cut on her head, and then he struck her again with a frying pan. The last words Merel heard Araujo speak were "I told you I was sorry."

At some point after that, Brown woke Paul Merel, and they left the house with Emmanuel Merel. Emmanuel Merel later testified he walked to a convenience store to buy gum, then went to a friend's house to spend the night.

Key locations
1. Newark, California, where Gwen Araujo was murdered
2. El Dorado National Forest, where Gwen Araujo's body was buried

Nabors and Cazares left in Magidson's truck to retrieve shovels and a pickaxe from Cazares's house, saying as they left the Merel house that the other men were going to "kill that b—". Brown recalled that after she had left with Paul Merel, they drove around the block and returned to the house to see Nabors and Cazares leaving in Magidson's truck.

=== Murder ===
When Nabors and Cazares returned, Araujo was still conscious, bleeding from her head wound and sitting on the couch. José Merel became concerned that Araujo was bleeding on the couch and ordered her off it. At some point, the assault resumed. Nabors and Cazares urged the others to "knock the b— out", according to Nabors's testimony. Magidson hit her head against the living room wall with his knee, rendering her unconscious. Nabors testified that Magidson's assault was so severe it left a dent in the wall and cracked the plaster. Cazares kicked her. Merel was concerned with cleaning Araujo's blood off the couch and carpet before retreating to his room so the others would not see him crying.

After Araujo was knocked unconscious, Magidson bound her wrists and ankles, then she was wrapped in a comforter to minimize the amount of blood staining the carpet, before being carried to the garage of the home. After this, the defendants' testimonies diverged.

Nabors testified that Magidson strangled her with a rope and that Cazares struck her with a shovel, but Nabors was returning from the garage and did not actually witness the act of strangulation. Referring to Araujo as Lida—the name she had used with them—Nabors testified that he saw Magidson raising the rope to her neck before he left the garage and that Magidson later told the others "that he had wrapped the rope around Lida's neck and twisted it."

Magidson testified that it was instead Nabors who strangled her and struck her with the shovel, and Cazares testified that he never struck her and did not see her die. José Merel testified he was cleaning Araujo's blood out of the carpets and couch as Magidson was binding her ankles, prior to her being taken to the garage. Merel also said he thought she was still alive until he saw her body in the bed of Magidson's truck. It is not clear at what point during this sequence of events she died. However, the autopsy showed that she died from strangulation associated with blunt force trauma to the head. According to Nabors, Magidson "wasn't sure if Lida had died from twisting the rope, but once Jason hit her twice with the shovel, he knew she was dead".

She was then placed in the bed of a pick-up truck, and the four men drove her body four hours away, burying her near the Sierra Nevada mountains in a shallow grave in the El Dorado National Forest near Silver Fork Road in El Dorado County. On their way home, they purchased breakfast at a McDonald's drive-through window. Later that morning, during a phone conversation, Brown asked José Merel what happened, to which he replied "Let's just say she had a long walk home."

== Arrests ==
The partygoers did not report the crime and the assailants said nothing to anyone about the murder. Araujo usually checked in with her mother, so when she did not come home the day after the party, her mother called the police on October 5 to report her missing. Police did not initially take the missing persons case seriously, partly because she was transgender, and also because she was known to stay away from home overnight. Rumors reached her family that a girl who had been outed as transgender at a party had been killed and buried in Tahoe, and her aunt called the police on October 9 to pass on the story. Police began to interview the partygoers, and one of them led the police to the Merels' house.

Two days after Araujo was reported missing, a friend of Jaron Nabors described him as appearing distraught. Nabors had confessed to a friend what the four had done shortly after returning from the grave site. That friend tipped off the police and agreed to wear a microphone during a subsequent conversation with Nabors about the murder. Confronted with the recording, Nabors agreed to lead authorities to the body on October 15.

The Alameda County Sheriff's Office dispatched four crime scene investigators and two detectives to recover Araujo's body from the grave site. The four who were initially arrested and accused of the murder were Magidson (age 22); Nabors (19), José Merel (22), and Paul Merel (22).

Paul Merel was released after Brown and Emmanuel Merel told the police that he had left the scene with them. Magidson, Nabors, and José Merel were charged with murder on October 17 and held without bail. On October 24, Nabors pleaded not guilty, Magidson was still looking for an attorney, and José Merel was still reviewing the evidence against him. In an interview with the Los Angeles Times, Merel was confident that charges would be dropped.

After he was arrested, Nabors wrote a letter to a girlfriend in which he stated the defendants had discussed a "Soprano-type plan" to "kill the b— and get rid of her body". The letter was intercepted by sheriff's officials and led to the arrest of Cazares on November 19. Cazares had been identified as a potential witness on October 22. At the first trial, defense attorney Tony Serra accused Nabors of writing the letter knowing it would be intercepted and implicate Cazares.

== Trials ==
=== Jaron Nabors ===
Nabors pleaded guilty on February 24, 2003, to a lesser charge of voluntary manslaughter, which carried an 11-year prison sentence, along with a promise to testify against the other three defendants. During the formal entry of his plea, Judge Kenneth Burr warned Nabors that he could still be charged with murder if prosecutors found he was not "living up to your end of the bargain".

During the February 2003 indictment proceedings, Nabors gave a detailed account of the murder and burial. As they were burying her, the men continued to disparage her. Nabors testified that he stated he "couldn't believe that someone would ever do that, would be that deceitful" and that José Merel added "he was so mad he could still kick her a couple more times".

Nabors received an 11-year sentence on August 25, 2006. With credit for time served, he was expected to spend approximately five years in jail from that point on.

=== Magidson, Merel, and Cazares ===
==== First trial ====
Before the first trial, the prosecuting attorney, Alameda County deputy district attorney Chris Lamiero argued that simply being transgender should not have been a death sentence:

One can debate the propriety of one choosing to identify with a gender other than the one they were born with. But I trust juries to understand that people don't get to make life or death decisions simply based on someone's lifestyle. That's not a world in which I want to live or most people want to live in.

Jury selection for the trial of Magidson, José Merel, and Cazares began on March 15, 2004. Prospective jurors were asked if they knew any lesbian, gay, bisexual, or transgender people; whether they knew any recently married same-sex couples; whether they had met any transgender people; or whether they had seen a "movie or theatrical performance depicting the activities of a transgender person". One of the defense attorneys explained the last question had specifically asked if prospective jurors had watched the film Boys Don't Cry or the play The Laramie Project, but was changed over defense concerns that by being so specific, those who had not would be prompted to watch them.

The first trial began on April 14, 2004. Prosecuting attorney Lamiero deadnamed Araujo, using he/him pronouns and her birth name to refer to her, saying the defendants had decided "that the wages of [Gwen] Araujo's sin of deception were death". In his opening statement, the defense attorney for Magidson argued that he should not be charged with murder, rather manslaughter at worst, under California law. Magidson's attorney said that his client was not biased but had been shocked "beyond reason" to learn he had unwittingly had sex with a "man": a variant of the gay panic defense. During his testimony, Nabors said he felt his friends had been raped, since Araujo (whom he referred to as male) "did not come clean with being what he really was. I feel like he forced them into homosexual sex, and my definition of rape was being forced into sex." When asked how she forced them, Nabors answered, "Through deception."

The first trial ended in a mistrial on June 22 following nine days of deliberations, when the jurors were unable to reach a unanimous decision for the three men. While the jury agreed that Araujo had been murdered, they could not agree whether it was premeditated. The final votes were 10–2 in favor of acquitting Merel and Cazares of first-degree murder, and 7–5 in favor of convicting Magidson of first-degree murder. Although they were given the option of convicting the men of second-degree murder or manslaughter, they were unable to proceed past the first-degree murder deliberations.

One of the jurors wrote a newspaper article after the mistrial; in it, he credited Cazares's defense attorney, Tony Serra, with introducing enough reasonable doubt about the veracity of the prosecution's witnesses, including both Brown (who had admitted to consuming more than a dozen beers that night) and Nabors (who was characterized as a liar and "chameleon", prone to exaggeration and eager to please in every social situation).

==== Second trial ====
The second trial began on May 31, 2005. Publicity by transgender activists was credited with informing the public about the tactics the defense lawyers had adopted to blame Araujo for her own death, changing the approach to the case. The day after the first trial ended in a mistrial, a court granted Araujo's mother's petition for a posthumous name change, requiring the defense lawyers to refer to the victim with female pronouns. Magidson, Merel, and Cazares were charged with first-degree murder with hate-crime enhancements.

[Gwen] lived every day of her life yearning and longing to be a girl in every sense of the word, so if anyone who didn't know her made her feel that way, why would she reveal that she is transgender? Especially in today's society, she would have been rejected if not harmed had she been so open about it.

— Emma Rodrigues, Gwen Araujo's aunt, Statement at sentencing hearing, January 27, 2006

The three defendants testified in this trial—and blamed each other as well as Nabors. Nabors, testifying for the prosecution, stated that Magidson admitted to strangling Araujo. Merel testified that Nabors was responsible for the major head injuries to Araujo, but supported the assertion that Magidson had strangled her. Magidson testified that Nabors admitted he had strangled Araujo. During Magidson's testimony, a tape of his initial interview with the police was shown, in which an investigator was recorded coaching him to use the trans panic defense: "You'd be surprised. Moms—especially moms—if they knew the facts—you'd be surprised."

During the closing statements of the second trial, Cazares' defense lawyer Tony Serra argued that the three defendants were "ordinary human beings" who were guilty, at most, of manslaughter for their role in the death in a "classic state of heat and passion". Serra also argued that Cazares took no active role in killing her. To avoid a second mistrial, prosecuting attorney Chris Lamiero argued for a first-degree murder conviction, but gave jurors the option of a second-degree murder conviction for the three, or even manslaughter for Merel. He asked the jury to return first-degree murder convictions of Magidson and Cazares, fingering Magidson as the main culprit who had strangled Araujo and calling him "a poor excuse for a man" with a "stupid and moronic" list of excuses for murdering her.

On September 8, the jury announced that it had reached verdicts on two of the three defendants. As Judge Harry Sheppard instructed, the verdicts were kept secret.

On September 12, after a week of deliberation, the jury announced its verdicts. It had deadlocked on Cazares, voting 9–3 in favor of convicting him for murder. Magidson and Merel were each convicted on the charge of second-degree murder, but not convicted of the hate-crime enhancement allegations. After the trial, one of the jurors stated in an interview with the San Francisco Chronicle that the murder conviction was because "The community standard is not and cannot be that killing is something a reasonable person would have done that night" but not hate crimes since the murder was believed to have been committed not because Araujo was transgender, but to "cover up a situation that had gotten out of control".

Lamiero had undermined criminal intent by commenting, "Gwen being transgender was not a provocative act. It's who she was. However, I would not further ignore the reality that Gwen made some decisions in her relation with these defendants that were impossible to defend ... I don't think most jurors are going to think it's OK to engage someone in sexual activity knowing they assume you have one sexual anatomy when you don't."

Michael Magidson and José Merel were sentenced in January to 15 years to life in prison, for second-degree murder. While Merel expressed deep sorrow and regret to Araujo's family, Magidson was angry about his verdict and expressed "no remorse" for his role in murdering Araujo, according to presiding Judge Harry Sheppard.

==== Jason Cazares ====
To avoid a third trial, Cazares pleaded no contest to manslaughter on December 16, 2005, and was sentenced to six years in prison, with credit for time already served. Attorney Gloria Allred represented Araujo's family. Cazares asked to begin serving his sentence after the birth of his third child, scheduled for March or April 2006, which was granted, although Lamiero noted "it's difficult for me to entertain a request like that when Gwen Araujo is dead". According to Lamiero, Cazares was willing to plead guilty to being an accessory after the fact, but that deal was rejected because the sentence was just three years and admitted no culpability in the murder.

== Aftermath ==
Araujo was mourned in a public funeral at St. Edwards Catholic Church in Newark on October 25, 2002. Fred Phelps and the members of Phelps's Westboro Baptist Church promised to picket the funeral, but did not. There were people there that picketed with signs, but friends wore angel wings to block the casket from the signs. She was cremated, and her mother Sylvia Guerrero retained the urn with her ashes.

TransVision, a comprehensive health and social services program for transgender people in Alameda County, was founded in 2002 and operated by Tri-City Health Center after the murder of Gwen Araujo.

At the request of Guerrero, a judge posthumously changed the victim's legal name to Gwen Amber Rose Araujo on June 23, 2004. Amber Rose was the name Guerrero had chosen before her child was born, in the event it was a girl.

On the first anniversary of the murder, Horizons Foundation created the Gwen Araujo Memorial Fund for Transgender Education. The fund's purpose was to support school-based programs in the nine-county Bay Area that promote understanding of transgender people and issues through annual grants. Through this fund, Sylvia Guerrero and her family spoke in middle and high schools about transgender awareness and understanding. By 2005, Guerrero had spoken to more than 20 schools. The fund was closed sometime before September 2020.

Sylvia Guerrero, Araujo's mother, worked as a legal assistant at a San Jose law firm, but, as of 2016, was homeless due to PTSD from the incident. Guerrero has been unable to return to work and now moves her belongings from relatives' houses using a borrowed car from her friend. As of 2022, Guerrero was staying with her son but was still too traumatized to return to work.

=== Media portrayals ===
- The song Ballad of Gwen Araujo was released in 2004 by Phil and the Osophers.
- A Lifetime movie titled A Girl Like Me: The Gwen Araujo Story, starring J. D. Pardo and Mercedes Ruehl, first aired in June 2006.
- The case was also the subject of a 2007 documentary, Trained in the Ways of Men. This documentary by Michelle Prevost examines the 2002 murder, and aims to debunk the so-called gay panic (or trans panic) defense.
- "Deadly ID", an episode of Investigation Discovery's Fatal Encounters (season 1 episode 8, first aired May 7, 2012) explored the crime's timeline from both Araujo's and Magidson's dramatized perspectives.
- An episode of the Investigation Discovery's Murder Among Friends titled "Murder Party" (season 2 episode 4) aired on July 6, 2017. The episode examines the case using dramatizations of the background of Araujo, events leading up to her murder and the aftermath. It also examines the backgrounds of the killers and their friends, how they got caught, and interviews with the victim's mother, friends, and the victim's advocates, along with showing actual photos of her and her murderers and explaining how the court trials went.

=== California legislation ===
In September 2006, California Governor Arnold Schwarzenegger signed the "Gwen Araujo Justice for Victims Act" (AB 1160) into law. The law limited the use by criminal defendants of the "gay/trans panic defense" by allowing parties to instruct jurors not to let bias influence their decisions, including "bias against the victim" based on his or her "gender identity, or sexual orientation". The law put California on record as declaring it contrary to public policy for defendants to be acquitted or convicted of a lesser included offense on the basis of appeals to "societal bias".

In September 2014, California Governor Jerry Brown signed Assembly Bill No. 2501 into law. The law further restricted the use of the gay/trans panic defense by amending California's manslaughter statute to prohibit defendants from claiming that they were provoked to murder by discovering a victim's sexual orientation or gender identity. AB 2501 was introduced by Assemblywoman Susan A. Bonilla in partnership with Equality California. In announcing the bill's introduction they cited the murder of Araujo and the 2008 murder of gay California teen Larry King.

=== Parole and release ===
Jason Cazares was released from prison in July 2012.

Jaron Nabors was released from prison some time before 2016.

José Merel was granted parole in 2016 with the support of Sylvia Guerrero.

Michael Magidson said he was not ready for release at his first parole board hearing in 2016, and his request for parole was also opposed by Guerrero. Magidson has since had two more parole hearings, which occurred in September 2019 and August 2024, and was denied parole both times. He will be eligible for parole again in 2029.

== See also ==
- Brandon Teena
- Murder of Angie Zapata
- Trans bashing
- Transgender history in the United States
- History of violence against LGBTQ people in the United States
- List of people killed for being transgender
- Transgender Day of Remembrance
