= Velikovo, Gorokhovetsky District, Vladimir Oblast =

Velikovo Великово
- Village
- Location within Vladimir Oblast Location within Russia
- Coordinates: 56°09′N 42°48′E
- Country: Russia
- Region: Vladimir Oblast
- District: Gorokhovetsky District
- Time zone: UTC+3:00

Velikovo (Russian: Великово) is a rural locality (a village) in Kupriyanovskoye Rural Settlement, Gorokhovetsky District, Vladimir Oblast, Russia. The population was 618 as of 2010. There are 34 streets.

== Geography ==
Velikovo is located 12 km southeast of Gorokhovets (the district's administrative centre) by road. Semyonovka is the nearest rural locality.
