= Violence against transgender people =

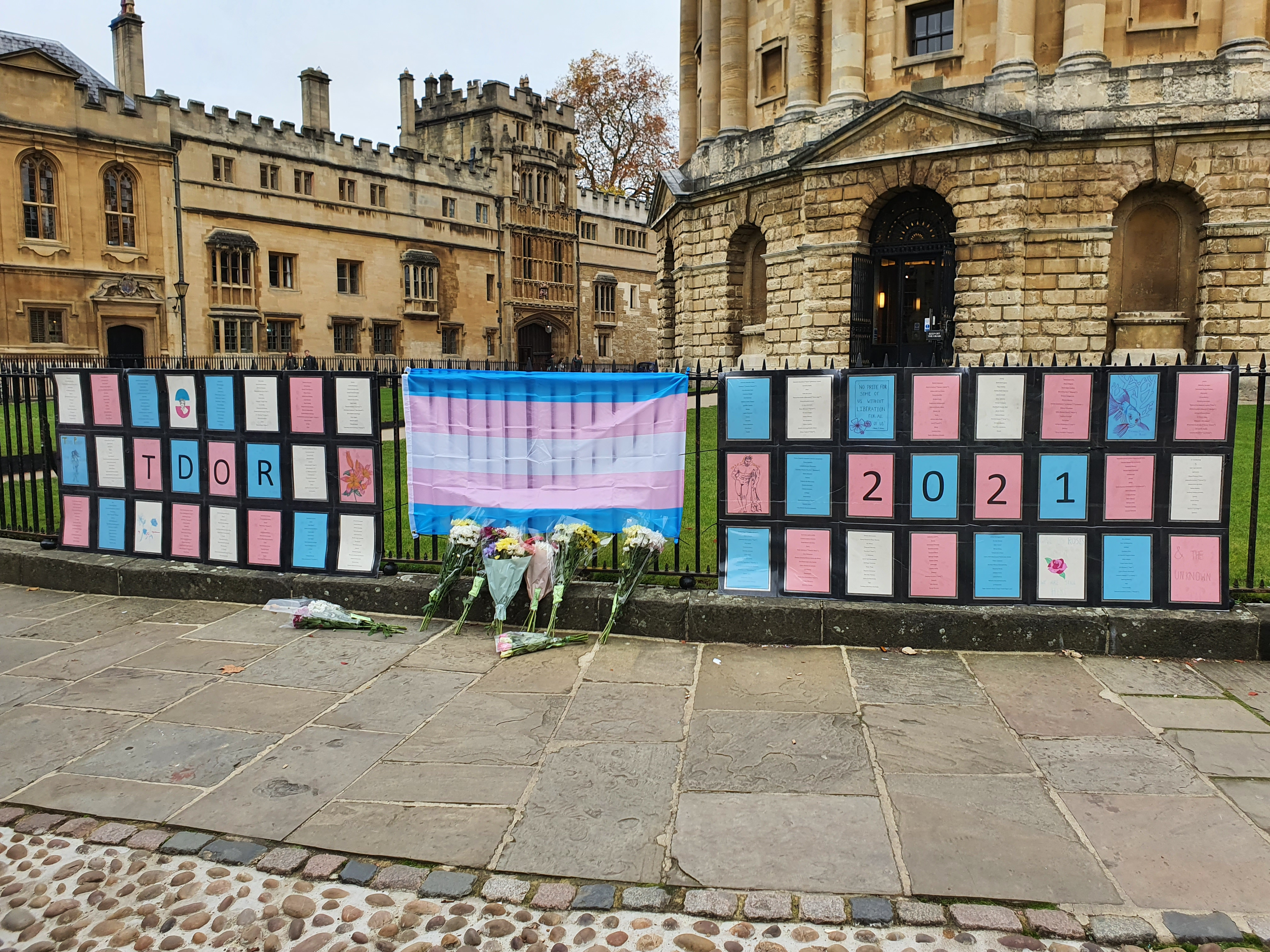
A 2021 Transgender Day of Remembrance memorial in Radcliffe Square, Oxford

Violence against transgender people includes both physical and sexual violence targeted towards transgender people. These and other hate crimes against trans people are common, and "in some instances, inaction by police or other government officials leads to the untimely deaths of transgender victims." Protections against violence for transgender people vary by jurisdiction. Due to continued violence and murder of transgender people, communities have observed Transgender Day of Remembrance since 1999.

Some believe that hate speech directed at transgender people should be regarded as violence as well as depictions of transgender people in the media that reinforce negative stereotypes.

When compared to their cisgender peers, trans and non-binary gender adolescents in the USA are also at increased risk of victimisation by bullying and harassment.

Institutional discrimination against trans people due to transphobia or homophobia is a common occurrence for trans people.

== Differentiation from gay bashing ==
Unlike gay bashing, anti-trans violence is committed because of the target's actual or perceived gender identity or gender expression, not sexual orientation.

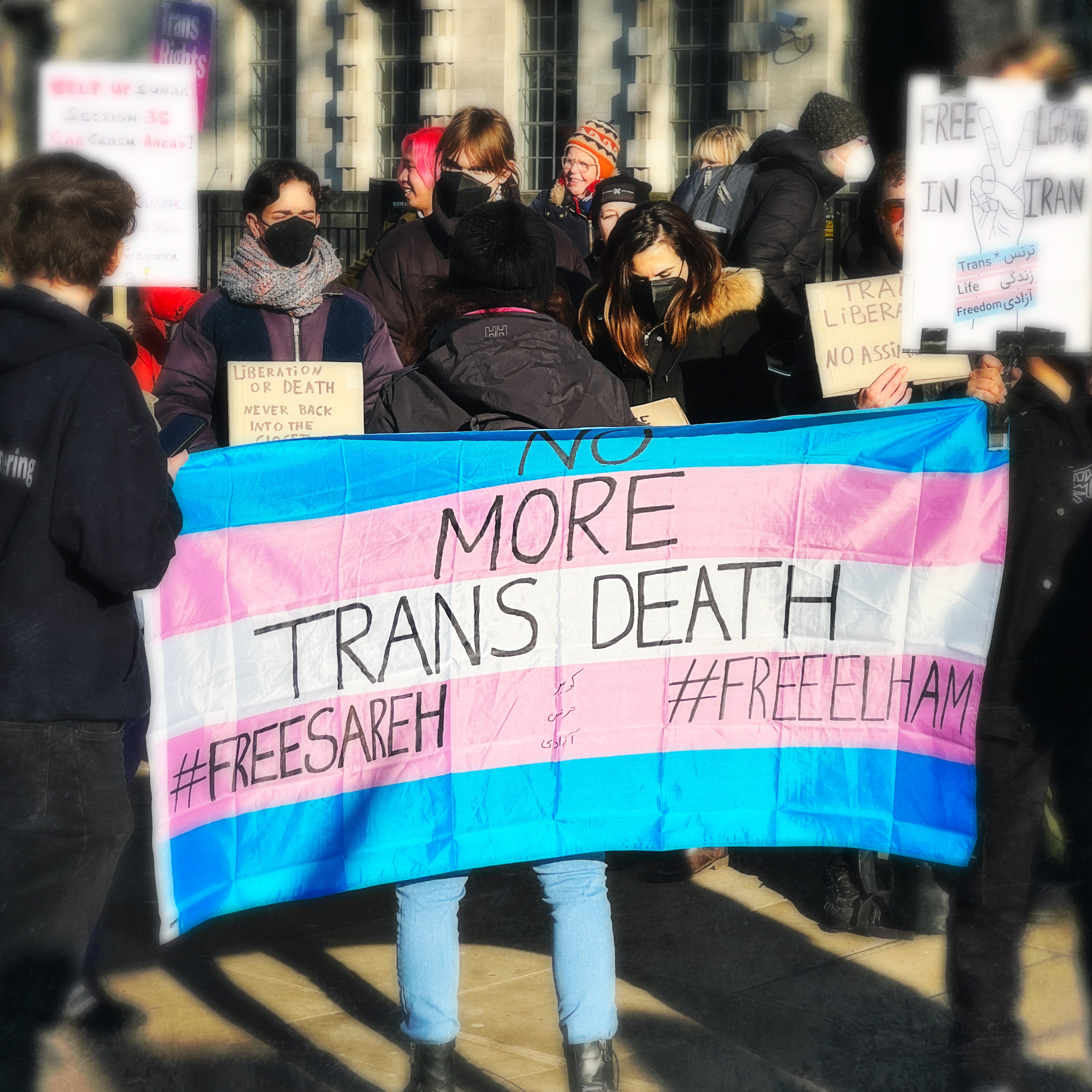
Protest at London for transgender rights with flag reading, "No More Trans Death" on the transgender flag

At least since the Stonewall riots in 1969, people from the greater trans communities have often been politically aligned with the lesbian, gay, and bisexual communities. However, researchers and some activists from the greater trans communities argue trans bashing should be categorized separately from violence committed on the basis of sexual orientation ("gay-bashing"). Anti-trans bias crimes have been conceptually and characteristically distinguished from homophobic crimes in the scholarly research. One argument is that conflating violence against trans people with violence against gay people erases the identities of people in the greater trans communities and the truth of what happens to them. However, campaigns against gay bashing and trans bashing are often seen as having a common cause.

In the murder case of Gwen Araujo, the perpetrators accused of hate crimes against her tried to use a trans panic defense, an extension of the gay panic defense. The jury deadlocked, but there is evidence they rejected the trans panic defense. One law journal provided an analysis of the trans-panic defense, arguing in part that the emotional premise of a trans panic defense (shock at discovering unexpected genitals) is different from the emotional premise of a gay panic defense (shock at being propositioned by a member of the same sex, perhaps because of one's repressed homosexuality).

== Laws covering gender identity ==
=== International ===
When the United Nations adopted their Universal Declaration of Human Rights in 1948 as the first global declaration of human rights, LGBT rights were not included. Despite this, some of the articles in the declaration could be interpreted as relevant:

- Article 2 entitles individuals to all of the rights and freedoms set forth in the declaration "without distinction of any kind, such as race, colour, sex, language, religion, political or other opinion, national or social origin, property, birth or other status".
- Article 5 states that "[n]o one shall be subjected to torture or to cruel, inhuman or degrading treatment or punishment."
- Article 7 states that "[a]ll are equal before the law and are entitled without any discrimination to equal protection of the law. All are entitled to equal protection against any discrimination in violation of this Declaration and against any incitement to such discrimination".
- Article 9 bans "arbitrary arrest, detention or exile" (which, according to Article 2, is protected from distinction based on identity or belief).
- Article 20 states that "[e]veryone has the right to freedom of opinion and expression; this right includes freedom to hold opinions without interference and to seek, receive and impart information and ideas through any media and regardless of frontiers."

=== Pakistan ===
Transgender rights are legally protected by the law of Pakistan via the Transgender Persons (Protection of Rights) Act, 2018 which prohibits discrimination and violence against trans people in the country.

=== United States ===
Current U.S. LGBT hate crimes laws by state. A national hate crimes law encompasses both sexual orientation and gender identity. Sexual orientation and gender identity recognized in state hate crimes law Sexual orientation recognized in state hate crimes law Sexual orientation recognized for data collection about hate crimes State hate crimes law uninclusive of sexual orientation or gender identity

In the United States, currently seventeen states plus the District of Columbia have hate crime laws to protect people from being victimized on the basis of their gender identity (they are California, Colorado, Connecticut, Delaware, Hawaii, Illinois, Maryland, Massachusetts, Minnesota, Missouri, Nevada, New Jersey, New Mexico, New Hampshire, Maine, Oregon, Rhode Island, Tennessee, Vermont, Virginia, Utah, Washington, and Washington, D.C.).

The Matthew Shepard Act expanded the federal hate crime laws to include gender, gender identity, and sexual orientation. In order to qualify as a federal hate crime in the United States, the crime must include successful or attempted bodily injury due to the use of a firearm, explosives, weapons, fire, or incendiary devices. Hate crimes are covered by state, rather than federal laws unless the victim or defendant travel across state lines or national borders; using an interstate commuting route; the weapon has been brought across state lines; or if the conduct interferes with or otherwise affects commerce across state lines. This means that, unless hate crimes under the federal definition occur in a way that does not just affect one state, states have the freedom to implement their own hate crime laws. The protections of these laws range widely. Pennsylvania, for example, has not included gender identity in its hate crime protections since it was rescinded from the law in 2008.

== By country ==
=== Americas ===
==== United States ====
In the late 2000s in Seattle's gay village of Capitol Hill, there was evidence of an increase in incidents of violence against trans people.

===== 'Bathroom bills' to enforce gendered bathroom use =====
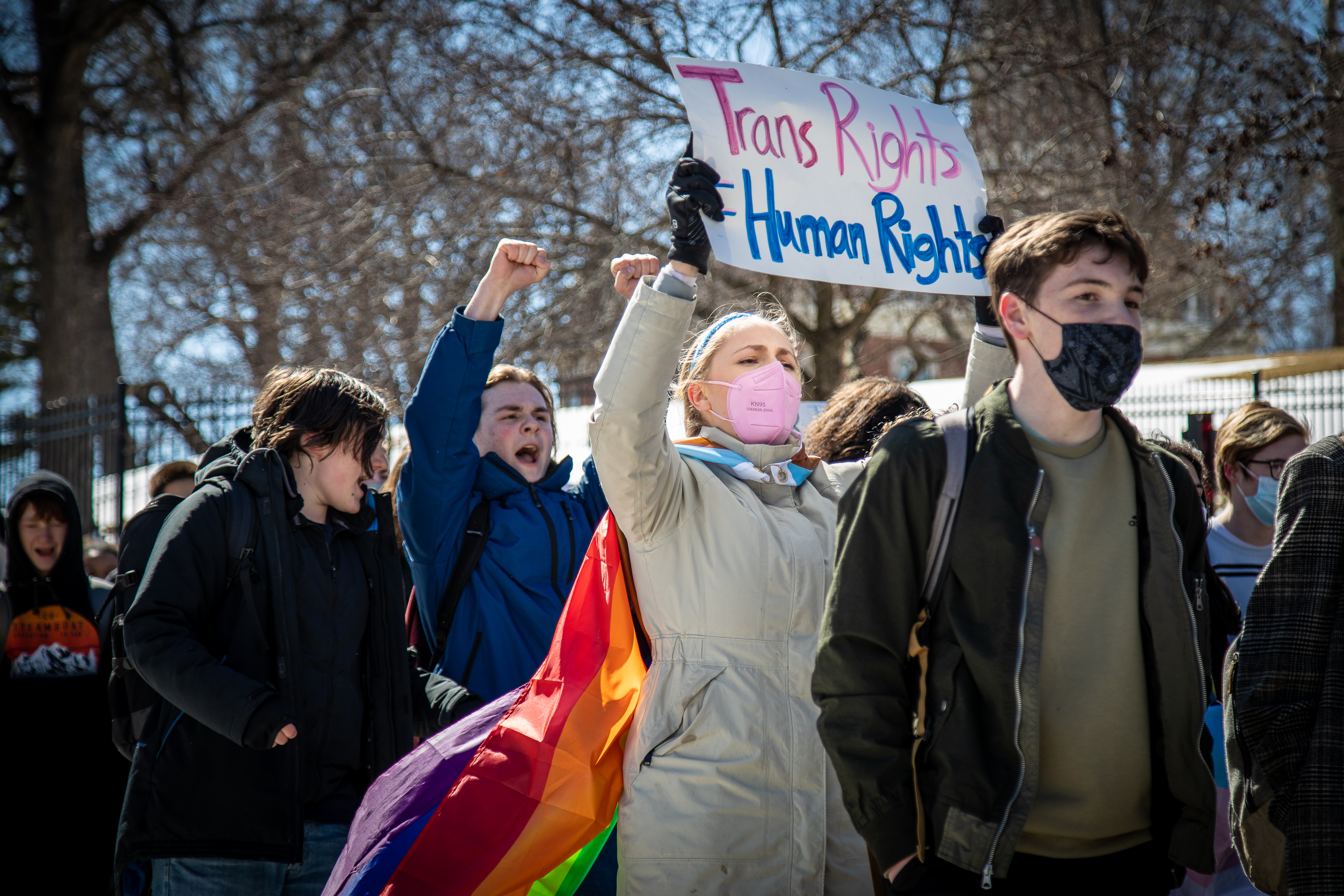
Students protest over anti-transgender bill in Iowa, 11 March 2022

Bathroom bills are bills proposed in relation to bathroom access and gender identity. There have been a number of bills proposed in the United States intended to limit access to restrooms for those who do not identify with their sex as assigned at birth. Some of these bills are justified with the rationale of protecting cisgender women from violent acts committed by cisgender men entering their facilities under the pretense of identifying as transgender women, although there is no evidence thus far of any instances of this.

Some transgender people are content, and may even prefer using gender-neutral bathrooms, but others expect the right to use the bathroom of the gender with which they identify. The Gay, Lesbian & Straight Education Network found that singling out trans students by offering them alternative facility options may backfire by increasing their chances of disengaging from school or dropping out entirely. Using bathrooms that are incongruent with the gender one presents as breaks social norms while following laws, and one study found that cisgender people report discomfort at the incongruous appearance between someone's gender presentation and the bathroom they're in even when the bathroom matches their assigned sex.

===== Harassment of transgender people in bathrooms =====
Transgender people are more likely to be harassed in bathrooms by cisgender people than vice versa. In one survey, 70 percent of the transgender respondents had faced discrimination when attempting to use a restroom of their gender identity, including "denial of access to facilities, verbal harassment, and physical assault." An example of such harassment occurred in 2018, when California Republican Congressional candidate Jazmina Saavedra said she heard the "voice of a man" from a locked stall in the women's restroom of a fast-food restaurant in Los Angeles and filmed herself chasing the person out of the restaurant with assistance from the restaurant manager. In the video, Saavedra said she was prepared to use pepper spray and a stun gun against the transgender woman. This kind of tactic can result in public outing of a transgender person's current or former gender identity.

One survey of transgender populations conducted in Washington, DC, by the group DC Trans Coalition, "found that 70 percent of survey respondents report experiencing verbal harassment, assault, and being denied access to public toilets." It also found that "54 percent of all respondents reported having some sort of physical problem from trying to avoid using public toilets, such as dehydration, kidney infections, and urinary tract infections" making access to safe restrooms a public health issue.

On 23 February 2020, a restaurant patron in Toa Baja, Puerto Rico made a police report that a transgender woman had entered the women's bathroom. Police arrived at the restaurant and spoke to the transgender woman. Someone filmed the police interaction and posted the video to social media. Later that day, the transgender woman—Alexa Negrón Luciano, also known as Neulisa Luciano Ruiz—was murdered.

=== Asia ===
==== India ====
In 2018, a transgender woman was killed by a mob in Hyderabad, India, following false WhatsApp rumors that transgender women were sex trafficking children. Three other transgender women were injured in the attack.

==== Pakistan ====
Despite having legal protections, trans people in Pakistan continue to be targets of violence. Between 2015 and September 2020, 68 transgender people were killed in Pakistan, and 1,500 were sexually assaulted in multiple incidents. In 2018, 479 violent incidents against transgender people were reported in Khyber Pakhtunkhwa.

In 2019, Amnesty International published a report indicating Shama, a transgender journalist, was raped by nine men in one of Pakistan's cities, Peshawar.

In September 2020, a prominent transgender activist, Gul Panra, was shot six times. Nayyab Ali was allegedly sexually assaulted and attacked by acid as a result of her being transgender.

=== Europe ===
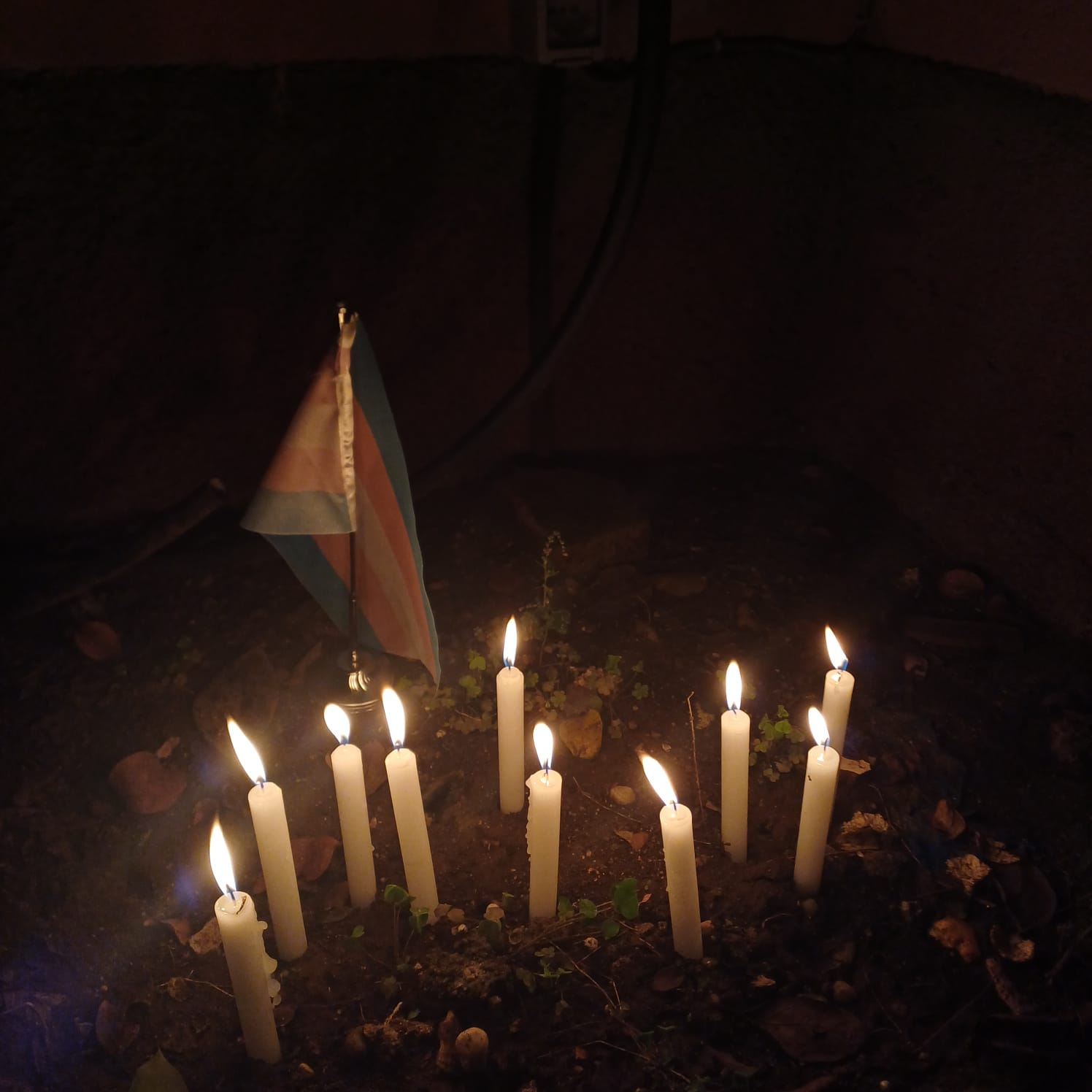
Candlelight vigil for Transgender Day of Remembrance in Tirana, Albania, 2023

Reports of hate-motivated violence against LGBTQ+ people increased from 11 percent in 2019 to 14 percent in 2023. Violence against transgender people in Europe is significantly more prevalent than that against other members of the continent's LGBTQ+ community.

==== United Kingdom ====
Hate crimes against transgender people in England and Wales and Scotland, as recorded by police, increased 81% from the 2016–17 fiscal year (1,073 crimes) to the 2018–19 fiscal year (1,944 crimes).

=== Africa ===
South Africa is the only African country with explicit constitutional rights protection against discrimination based on gender identity. Across the continent, transgender people experience violence and discrimination, often alongside other LGBTQ+ communities. Individuals who identify as LGBTQ+ continue to face discrimination and violence in many African countries. According to Amnesty International, twelve African countries have weaponized their legal system to discriminate against LGBTIQ+ people.

== In the media ==
The media can contribute to trans bashing through misinformation and scare tactics. Transgender individuals are oftentimes misrepresented negatively in media, or not represented in media at all. Transgender individuals may be portrayed in the media as curiosities or oddities, as mentally unstable persons, as predators or as thieves. A public example of this is the attention paid to the transition of Chelsea Manning, a transgender U.S. Army soldier imprisoned for releasing classified documents to WikiLeaks. A Fox News story on Manning's transition was introduced with the Aerosmith song "Dude (Looks Like a Lady)", while host Gretchen Carlson referred to Chelsea by her deadname, mocking The New York Times for "helping him" by using Manning's preferred gender pronoun. The Army refused to let her grow her hair as long as female prisoners, and continued referring to her using her deadname so as "to avoid confusion" until a court mandated her correct gender pronouns.

== Trans health ==
According to the 2011 National Transgender Discrimination Survey Report on Health and Health Care (NTDSR), which surveyed 6,450 transgender and gender non-conforming people, people who do not identify with their birth sex face obstacles to getting healthcare and have a greater likelihood of facing health issues related to their gender identity.

=== Mental health ===
Transgender people experience greater mental health problems, such as depression, anxiety, eating disorders, and post traumatic stress disorder (PTSD), as well as physical health disparities (e.g., cardiovascular disease). From the 2015 National Transgender Survey Report out of 27,715 respondents "forty-eight percent (48%) have seriously thought about killing themselves in the past year, compared to 4% of the U.S. population, and 82% have had serious thoughts about killing themselves at some point in their life." Trans people also have a higher rate of suicide attempts than the population as a whole. In 2013, 2.2% of U.S. adults had attempted suicide while 41% of trans people had attempted suicide at some point in their life in 2011. The rate of attempted suicide in transgender individuals increased to 51% for those bullied or harassed in school, 55% for those who recently lost a job due to bias, and 61% and 64% for those who were victims of physical and sexual assault, respectively. Low self-esteem in transgender people has been linked to being at high-risk for HIV transmission. In 2008, the rate of HIV in transgender women in North America was 27.7%.

=== Access to healthcare ===
In the 2010 and 2011 NTDSRs, 19% of the people surveyed reported having been refused medical care due to their gender identity and 50% reported lack of provider knowledge of transgender health needs. Under the Affordable Care Act, it is illegal for any health program receiving federal funding to discriminate based on gender identity. Discrimination includes refusal to admit, treat or provide any services that are available for other patients; subjection of patients to intrusive examination; harass or refuse to respond to harassment by other staff or patients; refusal to provide support services; obligation to participate in conversion therapy; and any sort of interference in the pursuit of health care rights.

=== Racial disparities ===
Race has been shown to compound manifestations of existing discrimination on the basis of gender identity. Black trans women have the highest suicide rate of any other group in the United States, at almost half attempting in their lives, while cisgender black women attempt suicide at a rate of 1.7% on average. Trans students of color face higher rates of harassment and violence in schools. American Indian transgender students face the highest rates of sexual assault in school at 24%, followed by multiracial (18%), Asian (17%), and black (15%) students. White transgender students face a 9% rate of sexual assault in K–12. Black trans women have a higher rate of HIV infection than other groups, with a 30.8–56.3% rate, versus 27.7% of MTF transgender people on average.

==== Police and incarceration ====
In the 2011 National Transgender Discrimination Survey, 22% of respondents who had interacted with the police reported harassment due to bias. 20% reported denial of equal services. 48% reported being uncomfortable asking for police assistance. Respondents who had served time in jail reported a higher rate of harassment by officers than by others in jail. For all respondents, 7% reported being held in a jail cell solely due to gender identity expression, while this number was 41% for black and 21% for Latino trans respondents. Transgender people have reported being refused medical care, particularly hormone therapy, in prison, with black trans people and American Indian trans people reporting the highest rates.

== See also ==
- Discrimination against intersex people
- Discrimination against non-binary people
- Discrimination against transgender men
- List of LGBTQ awareness periods
- LGBTQ movements
- Transgender genocide
- Transgender rights movement
- Transmisogyny
- Trust and safety issues in online dating services
- Violence against LGBTQ people
