= First Step Act =

United States federal statute

- Long title: Formerly Incarcerated Reenter Society Transformed Safely Transitioning Every Person Act
- Acronyms (colloquial): First Step Act
- Enacted by: the 115th United States Congress
- Effective: December 21, 2018

Citations
- Public law: Pub. L. 115–391 (text) (PDF)

Legislative history
- Introduced in the Senate as S. 756 by Dan Sullivan (R–AK) on March 29, 2017; Committee consideration by Senate Committee on Commerce, Science, and Transportation and House Committee on Transportation and Infrastructure; Passed the Senate on August 3, 2017 (Unanimous consent); Passed the House on July 25, 2018 (Voice vote) with amendment; Senate agreed to House amendment on December 18, 2018 (Yeas: 87; Nays: 12) with further amendment; House agreed to Senate amendment on December 20, 2018 (Yeas: 358; Nays: 36); Signed into law by President Donald Trump on December 21, 2018

United States Supreme Court cases
- Terry v. United States, No. 20-5904, 593 U.S. ___ (2021); Concepcion v. United States, No. 20-1650, 597 U.S. ___ (2022); Pulsifer v. United States, No. 22-340, 601 U.S. ___ (2024); Hewitt v. United States, No. 23-1002, 604 U.S. ___ (2025); Fernandez v. United States, No. 24-556, 608 U.S. ___ (2026); Rutherford v. United States, No. 24-820, 608 U.S. ___ (2026); Maxwell v. Thomas, No. 25-5930, ___ U.S. ___ (2027)

The First Step Act, formally known as the Formerly Incarcerated Reenter Society Transformed Safely Transitioning Every Person Act, is a bipartisan criminal justice bill passed by the 115th U.S. Congress and signed by President Donald Trump in December 2018. The act enacted several changes in U.S. federal criminal law aimed at reforming federal prisons and sentencing laws in order to reduce recidivism, decreasing the federal inmate population, and maintaining public safety.

== Procedural history ==
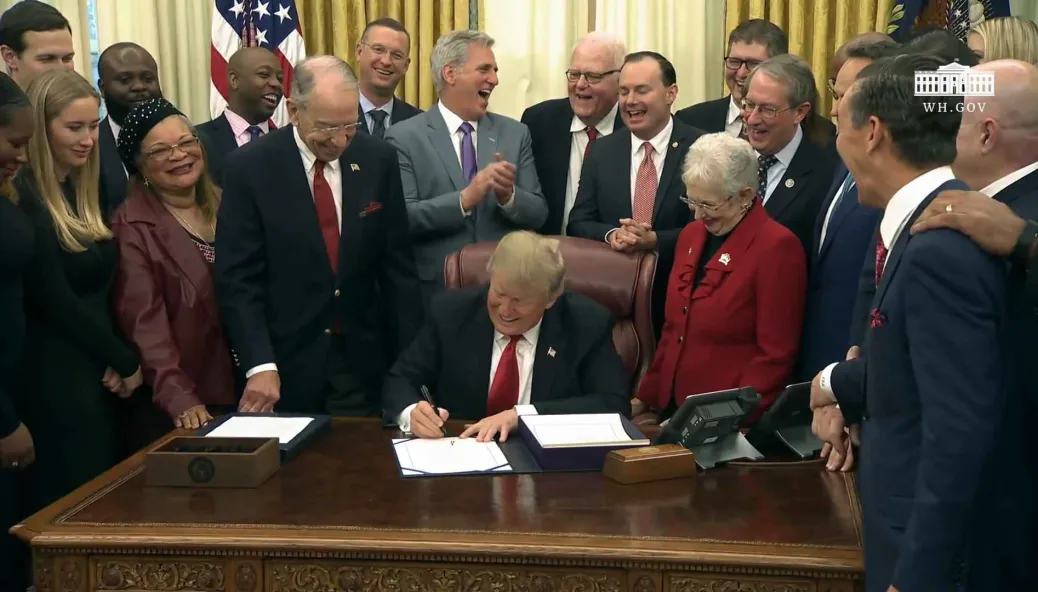
President Donald Trump holds a ceremony for the signing of the bill in the White House on December 21, 2018.

The first version of the First Step Act, H.R. 5682, was sponsored and introduced by Rep. Doug Collins (R-GA-9) with original cosponsor Rep. Hakeem Jeffries (D-NY-8) on May 7, 2018. This bipartisan bill primarily focused on recidivism reduction through the development of a risk and needs assessment system for all federal prisoners. The bill directed the U.S. attorney general to develop this system along with evidence-based recidivism reduction programs for federal prisoners. Under the bill, prison administrators would use the national risk and needs assessment system to classify a prisoner's risk of recidivism, to make decisions about which recidivism reduction programs might be appropriate for each individual, and to determine when a prisoner is prepared to transfer into prerelease custody. The draft legislation also included a number of other criminal justice reform provisions, including ones that permit Bureau of Prison (BOP) employees to store firearms in designated off-site firearms storage facilities or vehicle lockboxes and carry concealed weapons outside of the prison (Section 202); prohibit the use of restraints on prisoners during pregnancy, labor and postpartum recovery, except where a health care provider determines otherwise or where the prisoner is an unreasonable flight risk or public safety threat (Section 301); place prisoners as close as possible to (and no more than 500 miles away from) their primary residence where practicable (Section 401); expand compassionate release (also "reduction in sentencing" or "RIS") for terminally ill patients and reauthorize the Second Chance Act of 2007 (Section 403); mandate the Bureau of Prisons to provide identification to returning citizens (Section 404); authorize new markets for Federal Prison Industries (Section 406); mandate de-escalation training for correctional officers and employees (Section 407); direct reporting on opioid treatment and abuse in prisons (Section 408); improve availability of feminine hygiene products in prison (Section 412); and other actions.

After introduction, the bill was immediately referred to the House Committee on the Judiciary, and was subsequently voted out of committee—accompanied by a report—on a 25–5 vote on May 22, 2018. The House Committee's report highlighted Bureau of Prison data about recidivism, and warned of the fiscal and social costs of repeated arrest, conviction and incarceration. It also expressed concern with shrinking educational and vocational opportunities for inmates, given the proven potential of those activities to reduce criminal tendencies. The bill passed the House of Representatives by a 360–59 vote the same day, with remarks from many congressional members, including Rep. Jerry Nadler (D-NY-10), who acknowledged that though the bill did not include sentencing reform as some would have liked, it was an "important first step" that was able to unify groups as divergent as #cut50 and the Koch Foundation. After passage, the bill was referred to the Senate.

The Senate did not ultimately vote on H.R. 5682, nor did it consider S. 2795—a companion bill to H.R. 5682 that was introduced in the Senate on May 7, 2018, by Senator John Cornyn (R-TX) and referred to the Senate Judiciary Committee. The Senate did not actually vote on criminal justice reform until December 2018 due to disagreement about the scope of the First Step Act. Without the inclusion of meaningful sentence reform akin to the measures proposed in the Sentencing Reform and Corrections Act of 2015, many Senate Democrats were unwilling to support it. After months of intense brokering in the Senate, Senator Chuck Grassley (R-IA) introduced a version of bill (S. 3649) on November 15, 2018, that incorporated the correctional reforms from S. 2795/H.R. 5682, added supplemental measures, and—importantly—included new sentencing reform provisions. It garnered more than 40 cosponsors.

On December 12, Senator Grassley (R-IA), along with cosponsor Senator Dick Durbin (D-IL), introduced a revised version of S. 3649 as S. 3747, which preserved S. 3649's content and added an additional title reauthorizing and amending the Second Chance Act of 2007. In an unusual procedural move, and after reversing his statement that he would not proceed on a vote until 2019, the Senate Majority Leader Mitch McConnell (R-KY) on December 13, 2018, substituted the content of The First Step Act (S. 3747) into a S. 756—a substantively unrelated bill called the Save Our Seas Act, which was originally introduced by Senator Dan Sullivan (R-AK) on March 29, 2017—in order to solicit final amendments and bring the matter to a vote. (Due to this procedural move—known as "amendment in the nature of a substitute"—congressional records in various places reflect two wholly unrelated versions of S. 756 from the 115th Congress). Many Senators moved to submit amendments, among them Senators Tom Cotton (R-AR) and John Kennedy (R-LA). They introduced controversial amendment 4109 to S. 756 to expand the types of convictions that would render an inmate ineligible for good-time credits (the crime "exclusion list") and to require prison wardens to notify every crime victim of the release date of the inmate associated with their offense, among other information-sharing measures. They argued that these reforms were necessary to protect victims, but bill-backers viewed the move as a last-minute effort to derail months of consensus building.

In his statement to the Senate prior to the vote encouraging bill passage and discouraging the Cotton-Kennedy amendments, Senator Dick Durbin (D-IL) stated that the notification requirements of the Cotton-Kennedy amendments duplicated already-existing notification and information-sharing provisions of the Crime Victim Rights Act while undesirably disallowing victims to opt out of notifications. He also suggested that the Cotton-Kennedy amendments attempted to add crimes to the exclusion list that they had previously opposed. The Cotton-Kennedy Amendments were rejected in a 37–62 vote, and did not become a part of the bill. On December 18, 2018, the revised First Step Act passed the U.S. Senate as S. 756 on a bipartisan 87–12 vote.

The House approved the bill with the Senate revisions on December 20, 2018 (358–36). The act was signed by President Donald Trump on December 21, 2018, and became Public Law 115–391.

=== Support and opposition ===
Senators Chuck Grassley (R-IA), Dick Durbin (D-IL), Cory Booker (D-NJ), and Mike Lee (R-UT) championed the First Step Act in the Senate and built a bipartisan coalition to pass the legislation. In the House, Representatives Doug Collins (R-GA-9), Hakeem Jeffries (D-NY-8) and John Lewis (D-GA-5) promoted similar legislation, albeit without sentencing reform provisions. Though President Donald Trump was initially skeptical of the legislation, intense lobbying by his son-in-law and senior adviser Jared Kushner eventually persuaded him to back the bill and push for a floor vote in 2018. Kushner's efforts included contacting the Murdoch family (who own Fox News) to encourage positive coverage, appearing on Fox, securing Vice President Mike Pence's support, scheduling policy time discussions with Trump, and arranging meetings with celebrities like Kanye West and Kim Kardashian and media players like Van Jones to lobby Trump. Prominent conservatives from political and advocacy backgrounds also wrote to President Donald Trump on August 22, 2018, addressing criticisms of the First Step Act, assuring him of conservative support for the measure (including its sentencing provisions), and urging him to support it.

Republican lawmakers who opposed the bill included Senators Tom Cotton (R-AR), John Kennedy (R-LA), Ben Sasse (R-NE), and Lisa Murkowski (R-AK). Twelve Republican senators in total voted against the First Step Act. Though Senator Ted Cruz (R-TX) was originally opposed to the legislation, he ultimately backed the bill after an amendment he drafted to expand the crime exclusion list was adopted.

No Democratic congressional members voted against the First Step Act. However, some liberal commentators such as Roy L. Austin Jr., who worked on criminal justice in the Obama administration, criticized the act for not delivering more relief to more prisoners.

== Main legislative provisions ==
The law as enacted is divided into six titles and codified at various parts of Titles 18, 21, and 34 of the United States Code, based on the subject of legislation.

=== Title I ===
Title I directs the U.S. Attorney General to develop and publicly announce a risk and needs assessment system for all Federal Bureau of Prison inmates within 180 days of enactment, and to recommend evidence-based recidivism reduction activities. This risk and needs assessment system, once developed, is to be used under the First Step Act to classify prisoner risk of recidivism, match prisoners with suitable recidivism reduction activities based on their classification, inform housing decisions so that prisoners in similar risk categories are grouped together, and create incentives for participation in and completion of recidivism-reduction activities. These incentives include increased access to phone privileges, transfer to penal institutions closer to a prisoner's primary residence, and time credits to reduce sentence length. However, time credit rewards are not available to all prisoners; 18 U.S.C. § 3632(d)(4)(D)—where Title I of the First Step Act was codified—details nearly 70 types of convictions that render an inmate ineligible to accrue time credits for successfully completing recidivism-reduction activities. Additionally, prisoners subject to "a final order of removal"—which renders an individual deportable—are also ineligible from receiving good time credit incentives. Those who participate in risk and needs assessment activities may be eligible for prerelease custody or supervised release as described in 18 U.S.C. 3624(g). This title also increases the number of good-time credits per year—small sentenced reductions earned by prisoners for good behavior—from 47 to 54, which many believe was consistent with the original intent behind 18 U.S.C. § 3624(b)(1). Importantly, the law retroactively applies the good-time credits, making some prisoners immediately eligible for release based on accrual of seven additional good-time credits per year.

Title I of the First Step Act, as codified at 18 U.S.C. § 3621(h), also directs the Director of Bureau of Prisons to perform an initial risk and needs assessment of all federal prisoners within 180 days of the Attorney General's release of the risk and needs assessment system, and to begin expanding recidivism-reduction activities.

=== Title II ===
Title II, as codified at 18 U.S.C. § 4050, stipulates that the Director of the Bureau of Prisons must ensure that federal prison directors provide employees a secure place to store firearms outside of the prison, or allow employees to store firearms in an authorized and approved vehicle lockbox. It also allows federal BOP employees to carry concealed firearms outside of the prison.

=== Title III ===
Title III, codified at 18 U.S.C. § 4322, prohibits the use of restraints on prisoners during pregnancy, labor and postpartum recovery, subject to limited exceptions. If a correctional officer determines that the prisoner is a flight risk or poses serious harm to herself or the community, or if a healthcare professional concludes that use of restraints is consistent with medical safety, restraints must be used. However, they must be the least restrictive means possible to prevent escape.

=== Title IV ===
Title IV makes a variety of sentencing reforms. Section 401 amends the Controlled Substance Act (21 U.S.C. § 801 et seq.) to constrain the application of sentencing enhancements for defendants with prior drug felony convictions by redefining "serious drug felony" and "serious violent felony," to reduce the mandatory minimum sentence for a second violation from 20 years to 15 years, and to reduce the mandatory minimum sentence for a third violation from life to 25 years. It makes similar revisions to the Controlled Substance Import and Export Act at 21 U.S.C. § 960(b).

Section 402 expands the number of defendants who may be eligible for "safety valve" relief. Prior to the First Step Act, only defendants with one "criminal history point" could receive sentences below the mandatory minimums, but under the Act, defendants with up to four points (depending on the type of offense) may be eligible.

Section 403 eliminates the "stacking" provision of 18 U.S.C. § 924(c). Prior to this legislation, 18 U.S.C. § 924(c)—which stipulated that an enhanced mandatory minimum sentence could be added when a gun was used in the commission of a "second or subsequent" conviction—was interpreted to permit the imposition of enhanced mandatory minimum sentences where a gun was used in a concurrently charged offense. The First Step Act clarified that gun enhancements can only be added where the defendant was previously (i.e. non-concurrently) convicted of a gun violation, so as to restrict sentencing enhancements to "true" repeat offenders.

Section 404 applies the Fair Sentencing Act of 2010—which, among other things, reduced the discrepancy between sentences for crack cocaine and powder cocaine convictions—retroactively. Under the First Step Act, prisoners who committed offenses "covered" by the Fair Sentencing Act are permitted to petition a court directly to reconsider their sentence (after certain administrative steps are satisfied). Prior to this law, the Bureau of Prisons acted as the "gatekeeper" of prisoner petitions, and prisoners were not able to make motions to federal courts directly for back-end sentencing review.

=== Title V ===
Title V reauthorizes the Second Chance Act of 2007 from 2019 to 2023. This reauthorization directs the Attorney General to make grants to state and local projects which support the successful reentry of juvenile and adult prisoner populations into their communities after incarceration—including projects which improve academic and vocational education for offenders during incarceration.

=== Title VI ===
Title VI includes more than ten miscellaneous provisions, including those that place prisoners as close as possible to (and no more than 500 miles away from) their primary residence where practicable (Section 601); encourage home confinement for low risk prisoners (Section 602); lower the eligibility age and reduce to the time-served requirement for compassionate release, and broaden the prisoner population eligible for compassionate release to include terminally ill offenders (Section 603); mandate the Bureau of Prisons to provide identification to returning citizens (Section 604); authorize new markets for Federal Prison Industries (Section 605); mandate de-escalation training for correctional officers and employees (Section 606); direct reporting on opioid treatment and abuse in prisons (Section 607); direct data collection on various metrics for inclusion in the National Prisoner Statistics Program (Section 610); improve availability of feminine hygiene products in prison (Section 611); and prohibit the use of solitary confinement for federally-incarcerated juveniles, excepting certain circumstances (Section 613).

== Early achievements and implementation critiques ==
Scope of impact

Within the first year of enactment, more than 3,000 federal prisoners were released based on changes to the good-time credits calculation formula under the First Step Act, and more than 2,000 inmates benefited from sentence reductions from the retroactive application of the Fair Sentencing Act of 2010. Additionally, nearly 350 people were approved for elderly home confinement and more than 100 received compassionate release sentence reductions. While many groups applauded those developments, both liberal and conservative critics suggest that the Trump administration's Department of Justice (DOJ) did not properly apply the law, resulting in fewer prisoners enjoying the release and sentencing adjustment reforms than Congress intended. In many cases, DOJ prosecutors are opposing inmates' motions for sentence reduction under the First Step Act by arguing that the relevant drug quantity is not what the offender was convicted of possessing or trafficking, but the quantity that records suggest the offender possessed or trafficked. The latter figure is typically substantially larger. In some instances, DOJ prosecutors are trying to "reincarcerate offenders already released under the First Step Act."

Budget

Though the First Step Act authorizes Congress to appropriate $75 million per year between 2019 and 2023, only $14 million was explicitly earmarked for funding the legislation when President Trump released his 2020 budget priorities in March 2019. This lead First Step Act advocates to worry that the bill's underfunding represented an attempt to "starve it to death".

Transparency of risk and needs assessment system

In July 2019, the Department of Justice announced the creation of the risk and needs assessment tool mandated by the First Step Act legislation. Dubbed PATTERN ("Prisoner Assessment Tool Targeting Estimated Risk and Needs"), the tool is "designed to predict the likelihood of general and violent recidivism for all BOP inmates." The initial report detailed the mechanics of the assessment tool and its implementation, and invited a 45-day comment period. The Leadership Conference on Civil and Human Rights, The Leadership Conference Education Fund, the American Civil Liberties Union, the Center on Race, Inequality, and the Law at NYU Law, The Justice Roundtable, Media Mobilizing Project, and Upturn replied in a joint letter to DOJ outlining concerns about the transparency of PATTERN's algorithmic development, and its potential for exacerbating existing racial discrepancies in the criminal justice system.

In January 2020, the DOJ announced that all BOP prisoners had undergone an initial risk and needs assessment with the PATTERN tool as required by the law, and that the department was making changes to the PATTERN algorithm in response to feedback. However, allegations of racial algorithmic bias in the PATTERN tool persist.

== Compassionate release during the COVID-19 pandemic ==
On April 3, 2020, Attorney General William Barr issued a memo pursuant to § 12003(b)(2) of the CARES Act directing the BOP to review the sentences of all prisoners with COVID-19 risk factors and prioritize their transfer to home confinement, starting with the most at-risk facilities. Given the expanded eligibility for transfer to home confinement, many federal prisoners are trying to utilize the First Step Act's amended compassionate release provisions at 18 U.S.C. § 3582(c)(1)(A) to get out of prison. These provisions permit a federal judge to modify an inmate's sentence by motion of the BOP or by motion of the inmate after the inmate exhausts administrative requirements if "extraordinary and compelling reasons" warrant reduction or if the inmate meets certain age and sentence criteria, and so long as such a reduction is consistent with the U.S. Sentencing Guidelines. Some inmates argue that risk of contracting COVID-19 in prison is an "extraordinary and compelling reason" justifying sentence modification pursuant to 18 U.S.C. § 3582(c)(1)(A)(i). In United States v. McCarthy, Judge Hall of the United States District Court of Connecticut agreed with an inmate, finding that a for a 65-year-old prisoner suffering from COPD, asthma, and other lung-related ailments, the risk of infection from COVID-19 in prison was an "extraordinary and compelling reason" to justify his release from BOP custody, subject to post-release supervision conditions. However, not all courts have held that people with conditions "such as hypertension, heart disease, lung disease, or diabetes, which might make them more likely to suffer from serious complications if they were to contract COVID-19 meet any of the 'extraordinary and compelling reasons' specified in the U.S. Sentencing Guidelines."

In addition to differing on the merits of compassionate release petitions during the COVID-19 pandemic, federal courts are split as of May 2020 on the question of whether the administrative requirements of 18 U.S.C. § 3582(c)(1)(A)—which stipulate that an inmate may only move for compassionate release (1) "after the defendant has fully exhausted all administrative rights to appeal a failure of the Bureau of Prisons to bring a motion on the defendant's behalf" or (2) "the lapse of 30 days from the receipt of such a request by the warden of the defendant's facility"—are waivable. District Courts in the Second and Sixth Circuits (among others) have found the administrative requirements may be waived, such that the prisoner need not exhaust all appeal rights or wait 30 days after requesting that the warden petition a federal court for sentence review in order to directly seek relief. For example, in United States v. Scparta, S.D.N.Y. District Judge Nathan found that a 55-year-old petitioner ailing from high blood pressure, high cholesterol, sleep apnea, and hypertension was entitled to compassionate release even though he failed to exhaust the administrative requirements at 18 U.S.C. § 3582(c)(1)(A). However, the Court of Appeals for the Third Circuit in United States v. Raia and district courts around the country (such as S.D.N.Y in United States v. Roberts, N.D. Cal in United States v. Reid, E.D. Mich in United States v. Alam and E.D. Ky in United States v. Hofmeister) have held that the administrative exhaustion requirements are not subject to equitable waiver even during the COVID-19 pandemic, and must be complied with before federal courts can review the substance of the petitions.

== Subsequent legislation ==
On March 7, 2019, Senator Cory Booker introduced the Next Step Act to build off the First Step Act. At a celebration designating April 2019 First Step Act Month, President Trump announced that the next criminal justice priority for his administration would be a Second Step Act focusing on easing employment barriers for formerly incarcerated people. The legislation would include an $88 million funding request for prisoner reentry programs.

== Litigation ==
In June 2020, a unanimous panel of the United States Court of Appeals for the Seventh Circuit including then-Judge Amy Coney Barrett, held that during resentencing under the Act, a previous sentence over double the United States Federal Sentencing Guidelines range could not simply be reimposed without explanation.

In the Supreme Court case, Terry v. United States (2021), the Court decided unanimously that the resentencing provisions of Section 404, applying to changes in the 2010 Fair Sentencing Act, only apply to possession crimes that carried mandatory minimum sentences (tier 1 and 2 charges, both which were evoked on carrying minimum quantities of crack cocaine), and not tier 3 possession crimes.

In the Supreme Court case Rutherford v. United States (2026), the Court decided 6-3 that amendments to section 924(c) do not apply to defendants sentenced before the Act was passed and that excessively long sentences resulting from disparities decades prior, including life sentences for non-violent offenses, are not "extraordinary and compelling" reasons for a compassionate release, greatly reducing the power of the Act to reform the federal justice system.
