= Prison Legal News v. Secretary, Florida Department of Corrections =

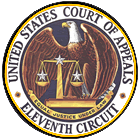
- Court: United States Court of Appeals for the Eleventh Circuit
- Decided: May 17, 2018
- Citation: 890 F.3d 954 (11th Cir. 2018)

Case history
- Prior actions: District court verdict, Prison Legal News v. Jones, 126 F. Supp. 3d 1233 (N.D. Fla. 2015)
- Appealed from: United States District Court for the Southern District of Florida
- Subsequent action: Petition for certiorari denied (2019)

Prison Legal News v. Secretary, Florida Department of Corrections, 890 F.3d 954 (11th Cir. 2018), was a case before the 11th Circuit Court of Appeals in which the Court held that a prison's ban of the Prison Legal News (PLN) monthly magazine did not violate the First Amendment, but its failure to give notice as required by its own rules violated the Fourteenth Amendment. In doing so, it affirmed the decision of the District Court from which the appeal came. PLN appealed to the U.S. Supreme Court on just the First Amendment issue, but the Supreme Court denied their petition for certiorari, declining to hear the case.

== Background ==
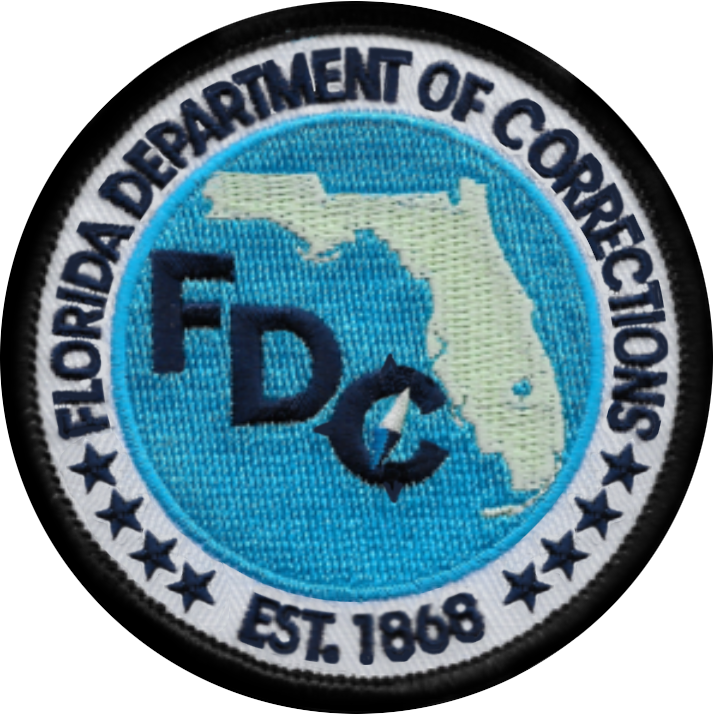
Florida Department of Corrections Patch since 2016

Prison Legal News (PLN) is a monthly magazine focused on legal events and developments that would be of interest to prisoners, often reporting on civil rights ligitation or criminal justice issues. It is a project of the Human Rights Defense Center (HRDC), a 501(c)(3) non-profit organization, and has been published since 1990. In 2003, the Florida Department of Corrections (FDOC) began to impound issues of PLN that were sent to inmates, due to advertisements they contained "accepting postage stamps as payment, three-way calling services, pen pal services, and offers to purchase inmate artwork." In Fla. Admin. Code R. 33–501.401(3), the FDOC had decided that each of these types of ads posed an unacceptable risk to prison security. Allowing inmates to pay for things with stamps encouraged the use of stamps as currency in black-market deals between inmates; three-way calling services might allow inmates to call people outside their approved phone contact list, possibly including criminal associates, or members of the public they might want to harass; pen pal services could be a way for inmates to defraud "kind-hearted but gullible people"; and inmates selling artwork would violate prison rules against running a business from a prison cell.

In 2004, PLN responded with a lawsuit, titled Prison Legal News v. Crosby, which argued that its First Amendment rights had been violated. In March 2005, while that case was pending, the FDOC amended its rules to allow such ads, as long as they were "merely incidental to, rather than being the focus of, the publication." The FDOC thus stopped impounding PLN issues, and the case was dismissed as moot. PLN still tried to get an injunction against the FDOC so they couldn't resume impounding later, but the District Court denied the motion for being moot, as did the 11th Circuit on appeal (in an unpublished decision, Prison Legal News v. McDonough, 200 Fed.Appx. 873 (11th Cir.2006)).

Then, in 2009, the FDOC added rule (3)(l), which prohibited publications with these ads if they were "prominent or prevalent". The rule went into effect in June, and the FDOC impounded every issue of PLN from September 2009 onward. This change was motivated in part by a slight increase in ad coverage, mostly in the form of more half-page and full-page ads. FDOC also objected to new kinds of ads they found in PLN after 2005, offering "prisoner concierge" and "people locator" services. "Prisoner concierge" services offered to manage almost anything on inmates' behalf, especially financial services, or communications tools like websites or cell phones. People locators offered simply to locate people, even "hard to find people [and] unlisted numbers and address[es]." The former could made it much easier to break the rule against running a business from a prison cell, and the latter could make it possible to harass people, including judges, attorneys, witnesses, jurors, etc. At the same time, the total ad coverage of objectionable ads was increasing. The total percentage of the magazine had only "increased only from an average of 9.21% in 2005 to 9.80% in 2009", but then from "9.80% in 2009 to 15.07% in 2014".

== Trial in the District Court ==
PLN sued in federal court on November 17, 2011, again alleging violations of the First Amendment, and this time adding claims of violation of due process under the Fifth and Fourteenth Amendments. Pre-trial litigation lasted four years, including a transfer to the Southern District of Florida in April 2012, settlements with private defendants Corrections Corporation of America and GEO Group in January 2013, and cross-motions for summary judgment (denied in August 2014).

=== Trial and findings of fact ===
During the bench trial, many facts were undisputed, such as the history listed above, and the fact that only Florida prisons banned PLN because of its ads. The parties at trial focused on evidence which supported or undermined the reasonableness of the FDOC's rules., e.g.:

- Whether the vendor for inmate's outgoing phone calls, Securus, was effective at preventing third-party calls (the court found that Securus' service was not perfect, but there was no evidence another vendor would do better);
- Whether PLN's ads could be shown to actually lead to security problems (FDOC had made no attempt to study this, but the court decided this was irrelevant as a matter of law)
- Whether PLN's ad coverage had changed significantly before the rule change in 2009 (although the numerical increase from 9.21% to 9.80% was small, the court noted the increase in half-page and full-page ads, such as an objectionable ad covering the back cover of all recent issues, and moreover the magazine was longer, so it contained more ads);
- Whether the FDOC had targeted PLN with the 2009 rule change (the court found FDOC was conscious of PLN, but the evidence was insufficient to support "targeting", given that no evidence was produced about how other publications were treated); and
- Whether the objectionable ads "implicated legitimate security concerns" (the court found they did).

Beyond that, PLN produced evidence that the FDOC's track record for sending notice of each impoundment was spotty, at best. Of the 64 issues printed (all impounded) between September 2009 and the trial in January 2015, PLN only received notice for 36 issues, and of those 36, only 8 gave any reason for the impoundment. There were even three times that PLN received a notice of rejection by the Literature Review Committee ("LRC")—a notice that a prison's on-site impounding decision had been upheld—before PLN received notice of the impounding, thus denying PLN a chance to appeal and be heard.

=== Trial court's verdict ===
The Court rejected a number of PLN's claims. It rejected a claim of judicial estoppel—that the FDOC's position was legally inconsistent with its earlier position during Prison Legal News v. Crosby—because the factual circumstances had changed. It rejected PLN's free speech claims, ruling that their free speech rights were outweighed by the prison's responsibility to maintain security, and that there was enough evidence to support the FDOC's concerns. In doing so, it applied the standards developed by the Supreme Court in Turner v. Safley. Although the Court had some concerns—including the fact that no other state found it necessary to censor PLN, the fact that LRC never reviews the entirety of impounded publications, and the basic vagueness of the world of the rules—they still found that "in this case, all Turner factors support the FDOC." Remarking, "running a prison system is not easy," it ruled in favor of the FDOC on the First Amendment claims.

However, it did find that the FDOC had violated PLN's due process rights under the Fourteenth Amendment by failing to provide proper notice. According, the Court issued a permanent injunction that the FDOC should provide proper notice in the future.

Both parties appealed, with the FDOC appealing the due process verdict, and the PLN appealing the rest of the verdict.

== Case of the Court of Appeals ==
=== Amici Curiae ===
The case attracted the attention of some legal scholars, and a group of 16 law professors filed an amicus brief to support PLN's position. They argued that the court should not give the FDOC too much deference, since "[m]odern First Amendment jurisprudence trends toward more protections for speech rights, a direction that should inform this Court's analysis." However, the Court of Appeals did not think Supreme Court caselaw had done much, if anything, to change free speech rules in the context of prisons, so this suggestion was mostly ignored.

=== Applying the Turner standard ===
The Turner standard governs nearly all prison regulations that affected constitutional rights, and it instructed judges to consider four factors: 1) whether there was a valid connection between the rule and a legitimate government interest, 2) whether prisoners have alternatives that remain open, 3) what effect any accommodations might have on inmates or the prison system, and 4) whether the rule is an "exaggerated response" to the problem. Rather than the more demanding level of scrutiny urged by the amici, the Court of Appeals said it would give " 'wide-ranging' and 'substantial' deference to the decisions of prison administrators." As such, the Court readily agreed with the analysis of the trial court in a de novo review.

==== 1) The existence of a rational connection ====
The Court found the FDOC's evidence and reasoning regarding each category of banned ad more than reasonable. It noted that PLN had even printed news stories about some of these problems, such that "an inmate reading Prison Legal News not only reads articles about inmates putting the prohibited services to dangerous use, but also sees ads that enable him to obtain those same prohibited services." It was not important that the FDOC had not studied whether PLN's particular ads had ever led to security problems before, since prison administrators had authority to anticipate problems.

==== 2) Alternative means ====
Although the Court conceded that this was "a close call", because Turner did not require "exact, one-for-one substitutes," it found there were adequate alternatives. Although PLN could not send its regular magazine, it could still send other publications, such as its "Prisoners' Guerrilla Handbook," which the FDOC allowed.

==== 3) Impact of accommodating the asserted right ====
The impact of allowing inmates to receive PLN magazines, the Court reasoned, would be that more inmates would try to use the banned services, and the FDOC would need to spend more of its resources on detecting and thwarting these attempts. Much as the Court found the first prong to favor the FDOC, it found that the cost-of-accommodation analysis favored the FDOC.

==== 4) Exaggerated response ====
Analysis of the fourth factor focused on comparison to approaches taken by other states. While it was true that other states did not ban PLN, the Court of Appeals saw no need to force Florida to adopt their approaches; it was enough that the FDOC had a reasonable system and was following it. One such comparison drew derision from the Court:

Last and most definitely least, PLN proposes that the Department follow New York's lead and simply attach to each issue of Prison Legal News a flyer reminding inmates not to use the prohibited services. Really? . . . the Constitution does not require Florida to join New York in la-la-land.

— Prison Legal News v. Secretary, Florida Department of Corrections, 890 F.3d 954 at 975 (Judge Carnes, writing for the three-judge panel)

=== Due process ===
The Court of Appeals, applying an "abuse of discretion" standard of review to the trial court's finding that the FDOC violated due process, found nothing wrong with that ruling, either. After all, the FDOC's rules on Admissible Reading Material would provide the "notice and an opportunity to be heard" required by the Constitution, if only those rules were followed. The Court of Appeals also had little interest in a suggestion by the FDOC that "the Secretary cannot be enjoined" without evidence of "a Department policy or custom to deprive PLN of notice."

The Department asserts that PLN should find the mailroom workers who are responsible for the failure to provide notice and sue them. No. PLN doesn't have to hunt and peck throughout Florida's correctional system for negligent mailroom workers to sue. The buck stops with the Secretary.

— Prison Legal News v. Secretary, Florida Department of Corrections, 890 F.3d 954 at 977 (Judge Carnes, writing for the three-judge panel)

== Aftermath ==
PLN appealed the ruling on its First Amendment claims to the Supreme Court in August 2018, but the petition was denied.
