= Concepcion v. United States =

- Supreme Court of the United States

Argued January 19, 2022 Decided June 27, 2022
- Full case name: Carlos Concepcion v. United States
- Docket no.: 20-1650
- Citations: 597 U.S. 481 (more) 2022 WL 2295029; 2022 U.S. LEXIS 3070
- Argument: Oral argument

Holding
- Section 404(b) of the First Step Act of 2018, 132 Stat. 5222, allows district courts to consider intervening changes of law or fact in exercising their discretion to reduce a sentence.

Court membership
- Chief Justice John Roberts Associate Justices Clarence Thomas · Stephen Breyer; Samuel Alito · Sonia Sotomayor; Elena Kagan · Neil Gorsuch; Brett Kavanaugh · Amy Coney Barrett

Case opinions
- Majority: Sotomayor, joined by Thomas, Breyer, Kagan, Gorsuch
- Dissent: Kavanaugh, joined by Roberts, Alito, Barrett

Laws applied
- Fair Sentencing Act; First Step Act

Concepcion v. United States, 597 U.S. 481 (2022), is a United States Supreme Court decision that concerns district courts' ability to consider changes of law or fact in exercising their discretion to reduce a sentence.

== Background ==
In 2006, Carlos Concepcion was arrested on felony drug charges for an illegal sale of cocaine. He pleaded guilty to the distribution of five grams of crack cocaine in 2008. His penalty carried a mandatory minimum sentence of five years in prison but with his previous criminal conviction, the mandatory minimum sentence was elevated to ten years. Ultimately, he was subsequently sentenced to 19 years' imprisonment.

In 2010, Congress passed the Fair Sentencing Act of 2010, which increased the minimum threshold for the mandatory minimum sentence to be triggered to twenty-eight grams of crack cocaine. But because the Fair Sentencing Act didn't apply retroactively, his sentence remained the same. However, in 2018, Congress passed the First Step Act, which allowed for the Fair Sentencing Act's sentence reduction to apply retroactively and granted discretion to district courts to "impose or withhold" reducing a sentence. Subsequently, Concepcion filed a motion for sentence reduction due to Section 404(b) of the First Step Act. He also argued that the district court should no longer consider him a career offender under the 2018 Federal Sentencing Guidelines, since one of his convictions was previously vacated. The district court denied Concepcion's motion.

Concepcion appealed to the United States Court of Appeals for the First Circuit. The First Circuit affirmed, stating that Section 404(b) does not grant a new proceeding and that resentencing is "discretionary." He subsequently filed a petition for a writ of certiorari.

== Supreme Court ==
The court granted certiorari on September 30, 2021, and heard oral arguments on January 19, 2022. On June 27, 2022, the Supreme Court reversed the First Circuit's ruling in a 5–4 vote and held that the "First Step Act allows district courts to consider intervening changes of law or fact in exercising their discretion to reduce a sentence." Justice Sotomayor wrote the majority opinion, while Justice Brett Kavanaugh authored the dissent.
