= Keathley v. Buddy Ayers Construction, Inc. =

- Supreme Court of the United States

Decided June 11, 2026
- Full case name: Keathley v. Buddy Ayers Construction, Inc.
- Docket no.: 25-6
- Citations: 608 U.S. ___ (more)

Holding
- To determine whether an omission of a claim in the bankruptcy context was inadvertent or mistaken for purposes of judicial estoppel, courts should look to the totality of the circumstances surrounding the omission.

Court membership
- Chief Justice John Roberts Associate Justices Clarence Thomas · Samuel Alito; Sonia Sotomayor · Elena Kagan; Neil Gorsuch · Brett Kavanaugh; Amy Coney Barrett · Ketanji Brown Jackson

Case opinions
- Majority: Jackson, joined by unanimous
- Concurrence: Thomas, joined by Gorsuch
- Concurrence: Sotomayor

Keathley v. Buddy Ayers Construction, Inc., 608 U.S. ___ (2026), was a United States Supreme Court case in which the court held that, to determine whether an omission of a claim in the bankruptcy context was inadvertent or mistaken for purposes of judicial estoppel, courts should look to the totality of the circumstances surrounding the omission.

== Background ==
Thomas Keathley and his wife filed a Chapter 13 bankruptcy petition in United States Bankruptcy Court in December 2019. The Bankruptcy Code requires debtors to file bankruptcy schedules listing their property, including "[c]laims against third parties, whether or not [the debtor] ha[s] filed a lawsuit or made a demand for payment." Debtors must swear "[u]nder penalty of perjury" that the information provided is "true and correct." In April 2020, based on the Keathley's disclosures, the Bankruptcy Court confirmed an amended repayment plan providing for interest-free repayment of 100% of creditors' claims over five years. In August 2021, while the bankruptcy case remained open, Keathley was involved in a car crash in Mississippi with a driver employed by Buddy Ayers Construction, Inc. Keathley retained a personal-injury attorney and informed his bankruptcy counsel that he intended to sue Buddy Ayers Construction. Neither Keathley nor his bankruptcy counsel disclosed the potential personal-injury claim to the Bankruptcy Court. Keathley then filed a personal-injury action in federal District Court in December 2021, asserting negligence claims against the company, again without notifying the Bankruptcy Court.

In March 2023, Buddy Ayers Construction moved for summary judgment on grounds of judicial estoppel based on Keathley's failure to disclose his personal-injury claims in the pending bankruptcy proceeding. Keathley immediately filed an amended schedule notifying the Bankruptcy Court of his pending claims. He then submitted affidavits in response to the motion for summary judgment, explaining that his omission had been inadvertent. The District Court, relying on Fifth Circuit Court of Appeals precedent, found that Keathley knew of the facts underlying his claims and hypothetically had a motive to conceal, and therefore held the omission was not inadvertent or a mistake, entering summary judgment for Buddy Ayers Construction. The Fifth Circuit affirmed, with one judge concurring but expressing doubt that judicial estoppel's goals were advanced by its application given evidence the omission was an "honest mistake."

The Supreme Court granted certiorari.

== Opinion of the court ==
The Supreme Court issued an opinion on June 11, 2026.
