= Jules v. Andre Balazs Properties =

- Supreme Court of the United States

Decided May 14, 2026
- Full case name: Jules v. Andre Balazs Properties
- Docket no.: 25-83
- Citations: 608 U.S. ___ (more)

Holding
- After a federal court has stayed claims in a pending action under Section 3 of the Federal Arbitration Act, that court has jurisdiction to confirm or vacate a resulting arbitral award on those claims under Sections 9 and 10 of the act.

Court membership
- Chief Justice John Roberts Associate Justices Clarence Thomas · Samuel Alito; Sonia Sotomayor · Elena Kagan; Neil Gorsuch · Brett Kavanaugh; Amy Coney Barrett · Ketanji Brown Jackson

Case opinion
- Majority: Sotomayor, joined by unanimous

Laws applied
- Federal Arbitration Act

Jules v. Andre Balazs Properties, 608 U.S. ___ (2026), was a United States Supreme Court case in which the court held that, after a federal court has stayed claims in a pending action under Section 3 of the Federal Arbitration Act, that court has jurisdiction to confirm or vacate a resulting arbitral award on those claims under Sections 9 and 10 of the act.

== Background ==
Between 2017 and 2020, Adrian Jules worked at the Chateau Marmont Hotel in Los Angeles, California. When the hotel ended his employment in March 2020, Jules sued in federal District Court in New York, alleging that Andre Balazs Properties, the owner of the hotel, unlawfully discriminated against him in violation of federal and state law. Citing an arbitration agreement Jules had signed before beginning work at the hotel, respondents moved to stay federal proceedings pending arbitration under §3 of the Federal Arbitration Act. The District Court ruled that the arbitration agreement covered Jules's claims and stayed proceedings. Jules then commenced arbitration against the hotel owner. The arbitrator issued a final award, ruling against Jules on all claims and awarding approximately $34,500 in sanctions to the hotel owner.

Back in the same District Court that had previously stayed Jules's claims pending arbitration, respondents moved to confirm the award under §9. Jules opposed confirmation while cross-moving to vacate the arbitral award under §10 on various grounds. Jules argued that, under Badgerow v. Walters, the District Court lacked jurisdiction to confirm the award because the §9 and §10 motions neither presented federal questions nor satisfied the requirements for diversity jurisdiction. The District Court disagreed and confirmed the arbitral award. The Second Circuit Court of Appeals affirmed, reasoning that Badgerow involved a freestanding action commenced for the sole purpose of vacating an arbitral award, but that the present action was distinct because it started as a federal-question suit before it was stayed pending arbitration. The Second Circuit held that a court with the power to stay an action under §3 has the further power to confirm any ensuing arbitration award, regardless of whether there is an independent jurisdictional basis for the §9 and §10 proceedings.

The case presented the question whether a federal court that had previously stayed claims in a pending action under §3 of the Federal Arbitration Act (FAA) had jurisdiction to confirm or vacate a resulting arbitral award on those claims, even when the motion to confirm under §9 or the motion to vacate under §10 did not independently present a basis for federal jurisdiction on its face.

The Supreme Court granted certiorari.

== Opinion of the court ==
The Supreme Court issued an opinion on May 14, 2026.
