= Terry v. United States =

- Supreme Court of the United States

Argued May 4, 2021 Decided June 14, 2021
- Full case name: Tarahrick Terry v. United States
- Docket no.: 20-5904
- Citations: 593 U.S. ___ (more) 141 S. Ct. 1858; 210 L. Ed. 2d 108

Case history
- Prior: United States v. Terry, No. 1:08-cr-20194, 2020 WL 8022235 (S.D. Fla. Jan. 27, 2020); Affirmed, 828 F. App'x 563 (11th Cir. 2020); Cert. granted, 141 S. Ct. 975 (2021)

Holding
- A crack offender is eligible for a sentence reduction under the First Step Act only if convicted of a crack offense that triggered a mandatory minimum sentence.

Court membership
- Chief Justice John Roberts Associate Justices Clarence Thomas · Stephen Breyer; Samuel Alito · Sonia Sotomayor; Elena Kagan · Neil Gorsuch; Brett Kavanaugh · Amy Coney Barrett

Case opinions
- Majority: Thomas, joined by Roberts, Breyer, Alito, Kagan, Gorsuch, Kavanaugh, Barrett
- Concurrence: Sotomayor (in part and in judgment)

Laws applied
- Fair Sentencing Act; First Step Act

Terry v. United States, 593 U.S. ___ (2021), was a United States Supreme Court case dealing with retroactive changes to prison sentences for drug-possession crimes related to the Fair Sentencing Act of 2010, its retroactive nature established by the First Step Act of 2018. In a unanimous judgement, the Court ruled that while the First Step Act does allow for retroactive considerations of sentence reductions for drug-possession crimes prior to 2010, this only covers those that were sentenced under minimum sentencing requirements.

== Background ==
Prior to 2010, the United States had strict federal laws related to drug possession under 21 U.S.C. § 841, which established a three-tier penalty system depending on the amount and type of drug, a response due to the crack epidemic of the 1980s. For crack cocaine, tier 1 crimes carried a ten-year mandatory minimum sentence for possessing more than 50 grams (1.8 oz), tier 2 crimes carried a five-year mandatory minimum sentence for more than 5 grams (0.18 oz), and tier 3 crimes did not have any mandatory sentence for amounts less than 5 g. Congress passed the Fair Sentencing Act in 2010 which altered the possession levels for crack cocaine to higher levels as to bring these in line with the possession levels established for powder cocaine. For example, the tier 2 possession level was increased to 28 grams (0.99 oz) of crack cocaine. Later, in 2018, the First Step Act was passed that, among other provisions, allowed those sentenced on drug-possession charges prior to the 2010 Fair Sentencing Act's altered levels to seek resentencing.

Tarahrick Terry had been charged with possession of 4 grams (0.14 oz) of crack cocaine in 2008, treated as a tier 3 violation, and was sentenced to 15 years in prison. Terry sought a resentencing hearing after the passage of the Fair Sentencing Act but was denied by both the United States District Court for the Southern District of Florida and on appeal at the Eleventh Circuit as his drug possession had been determined to be an act of recidivism. Following passage of the First Step Act, Terry again sought a resentencing hearing, arguing his possession fell under the retroactive considerations of this new act. Again, both the District Court and Eleventh Circuit ruled against this, stating that Terry's possession charge as a tier 3 act was not a covered crime under the First Step Act.

== Supreme Court ==
Terry petitioned to the Supreme Court, arguing there was a split circuit decision on whether tier 3 possession crimes could be resentenced under the First Step Act. At the time that Terry filed his petition, the United States government under the Donald Trump administration intended to defend its position in alignment with the Eleventh Circuit's decision. The Court granted certiorari on January 9, 2021, a few weeks before Joe Biden took office as president. Normally, once the Court had granted certiorari, the petitioner and respondent file briefs along with amicus curiae from third parties. However, with the change in the administration, the U.S. government did not file any brief, but instead on the brief deadline, filed a letter stated that it no longer intended to defend its position as respondent, believing that Terry's crime was a covered crime under the First Step Act. The Court had planned oral hearings in April 2021, but due to the government effectively dropping out from the case, the case's oral hearings were rescheduled to May 4, 2021, and the Court appointed law professor Adam Mortara to present the respondent arguments as to resolve the split circuit, rather than deem the case moot.

The Court issued its decision on June 14, 2021. The judgement was unanimous, upholding the Eleventh Circuit's decision that Terry's charge was not a covered crime eligible for resentencing under the First Step Act. The majority opinion was written by Justice Clarence Thomas, joined by all but Justice Sonia Sotomayor, who wrote a concurrence joining in judgement and in the opinion in part. Thomas's decision identified that within the First Step Act, the covered cases eligible for resentencing hearings were those that were "a violation of a Federal criminal statute, the statutory penalties for which were modified by [the Fair Sentencing Act]", principally those that carried mandatory minimum sentences and not tier 3 crimes which were not modified by the Fair Sentencing Act.

Sotomayor's concurrence had stressed that the Court's decision was bound by the current language of the First Step Act, and urged Congress to pass a new law that would remedy situations like Terry.
