= Montgomery v. Caribe Transport II, LLC =

- Supreme Court of the United States

Decided May 14, 2026
- Full case name: Montgomery v. Caribe Transport II, LLC
- Docket no.: 24-1238
- Citations: 608 U.S. ___ (more)

Holding
- A claim that one company negligently hired another to transport goods is not preempted by the Federal Aviation Administration Authorization Act because states retain authority to regulate safety "with respect to motor vehicles" under the act.

Court membership
- Chief Justice John Roberts Associate Justices Clarence Thomas · Samuel Alito; Sonia Sotomayor · Elena Kagan; Neil Gorsuch · Brett Kavanaugh; Amy Coney Barrett · Ketanji Brown Jackson

Case opinions
- Majority: Barrett, joined by unanimous
- Concurrence: Kavanaugh, joined by Alito

Laws applied
- Federal Aviation Administration Authorization Act

Montgomery v. Caribe Transport II, LLC, 608 U.S. ___ (2026), was a United States Supreme Court case in which the court held that a claim that one company negligently hired another to transport goods is not preempted by the Federal Aviation Administration Authorization Act because states retain authority to regulate safety "with respect to motor vehicles" under the act.

== Background ==
Shawn Montgomery sustained severe and permanent injuries after his tractor trailer was struck by a truck driven by Yosniel Varela-Mojena. Varela-Mojena was driving a load of plastic pots through Illinois for Caribe Transport II, LLC, a motor carrier. C.H. Robinson Worldwide, Inc.—a transportation broker—had coordinated Caribe Transport's shipment. Montgomery sued in federal District Court and alleged, among other things, that C.H. Robinson was liable for his injuries because it negligently hired Varela-Mojena and Caribe Transport. Montgomery claimed that C.H. Robinson knew (or should have known) from Caribe Transport's safety rating that hiring it to transport goods was reasonably likely to result in crashes that would injure others. The District Court held that the Federal Aviation Administration Authorization Act (FAAAA)—which preempts state laws related to the prices, routes, and services of the trucking industry in 49 U.S.C. §14501(c)(1)—expressly preempted Montgomery's negligent-hiring claim against C.H. Robinson. The District Court further held that the claim did not fall within the FAAAA's safety exception, which provides in §14501(c)(2)(A) that the FAAAA's preemption provision "shall not restrict the safety regulatory authority of a State with respect to motor vehicles." The Seventh Circuit Court of Appeals affirmed.

The Supreme Court granted certiorari to resolve whether the FAAAA's safety exception permits negligent-hiring claims against brokers like C.H. Robinson that coordinate shipments in the transportation industry.

== Opinion of the court ==
The Supreme Court issued an opinion on May 14, 2026.
