= T.M. v. University of Maryland Medical System Corp. =

T.M. v. University of Maryland Medical System Corporation
- Supreme Court of the United States

Argued April 20, 2026 Decided June 18, 2026
- Full case name: T.M. v. University of Maryland Medical System Corporation
- Docket no.: 25-197
- Citations: 608 U.S. __ (more)
- Argument: Oral argument

Case history
- Prior: 139 F. 4th 344 (CA4 2025), certiorari granted, 607 U. S. 1079 (2025)

Holding
- The Rooker–Feldman doctrine bars federal district court jurisdiction over cases brought by state-court losers complaining of injuries caused by state-court judgments rendered before the district court proceedings commenced and seeking district court review and rejection of those judgments, regardless of whether the state-court judgment remains subject to further review in state appellate proceedings.

Court membership
- Chief Justice John Roberts Associate Justices Clarence Thomas · Samuel Alito; Sonia Sotomayor · Elena Kagan; Neil Gorsuch · Brett Kavanaugh; Amy Coney Barrett · Ketanji Brown Jackson

Case opinions
- Majority: Sotomayor, joined by Thomas, Alito, Kavanaugh, Jackson
- Concurrence: Thomas
- Dissent: Barrett, joined by Roberts, Kagan, Gorsuch

T.M. v. University of Maryland Medical System Corporation, 608 U.S. ___ (2026), was a United States Supreme Court case concerning the Rooker–Feldman doctrine. In a 5-4 decision authored by Justice Sonia Sotomayor, the Court held that this doctrine bars federal court review of state court decisions even if those decisions are subject to further review in state court.
