= First Choice Women's Resource Centers, Inc. v. Davenport =

- Supreme Court of the United States

Argued December 2, 2025 Decided April 29, 2026
- Full case name: First Choice Women's Resource Centers, Inc., Petitioner v. Jennifer Davenport, Attorney General of New Jersey
- Docket no.: 24-781
- Citations: 608 U.S. ___ (more)
- Argument: Oral argument
- Decision: Opinion

Holding
- Federal courts can review constitutional challenges to state investigative subpoenas, particularly when the aggrieved party claims that the subpoena violates the First Amendment. That sort of claim can satisfy the standing requirement.

Court membership
- Chief Justice John Roberts Associate Justices Clarence Thomas · Samuel Alito; Sonia Sotomayor · Elena Kagan; Neil Gorsuch · Brett Kavanaugh; Amy Coney Barrett · Ketanji Brown Jackson

Case opinion
- Majority: Gorsuch, joined by unanimous

Laws applied
- U.S. Const. art. III

First Choice Women Resource Centers, Inc. v. Davenport, (Note: Formerly First Choice Women's Resource Centers, Inc. v. Platkin. On January 20, 2026, Jennifer Davenport succeeded Matthew Platkin as Attorney General of New Jersey. See First Choice Women Resource Centers, Inc. v. Davenport, 608 U.S. ___, ___ n.1 (2026).) 608 U.S. ___ (2026), is a United States Supreme Court case in which the Court ruled that federal courts can review constitutional challenges to state investigative subpoenas—particularly when those allegedly chill First Amendment rights such as donor association and advocacy. That sort of claim can satisfy the Article III standing requirement.

== Background ==
A crisis pregnancy center (CPC) is a nonprofit organization that provides counseling and support to women facing an unplanned or difficult pregnancy. Most operate as charitable organizations and offer their services free of charge.

CPCs typically provide pregnancy tests, counseling about pregnancy options, referrals for prenatal care or adoption services, and material assistance such as diapers, clothing, or baby supplies. Some centers also offer ultrasounds or other limited medical services, usually under the supervision of licensed medical professionals.

Many crisis pregnancy centers are mission-driven and encourage carrying the pregnancy to term rather than seeking an abortion. A large number are affiliated with religious organizations, though some operate independently. They generally do not provide abortions or abortion medication.

== Legal history ==
First Choice Women's Resource Centers (First Choice) is a nonprofit operating several crisis pregnancy centers in New Jersey. The case began when the New Jersey Attorney General opened a consumer-fraud investigation into First Choice. As part of that investigation, the Attorney General issued a civil investigative subpoena seeking documents and information, including internal communications and donor records. First Choice filed a lawsuit in federal court, rather than complying with the subpoena or waiting for the state to initiate enforcement proceedings in state court.

First Choice sued the Attorney General in the United States District Court for the District of New Jersey, seeking declaratory and injunctive relief under 42 U.S.C. § 1983. The complaint alleged that the subpoena violated the organization's constitutional rights, including the First Amendment (particularly associational rights related to donor disclosure) and the Fourth Amendment (on the theory that the subpoena was overly broad). The organization asked the federal court to block enforcement of the subpoena. The district court dismissed the suit and concluded that federal intervention was inappropriate at that stage because the subpoena had not yet been enforced and the organization could raise its constitutional objections if and when the Attorney General sought enforcement in state court. The court therefore declined to entertain the pre-enforcement challenge.

First Choice appealed to the United States Court of Appeals for the Third Circuit, which affirmed the dismissal. The Third Circuit held that federal courts generally should not intervene in ongoing state investigative processes where the target of a subpoena has an adequate opportunity to assert constitutional defenses in state enforcement proceedings. Because First Choice could contest the subpoena in state court, the panel agreed that the federal suit should not proceed.

== Supreme Court ==
On January 21, 2025, First Choice filed a petition for a writ of certiorari in the United States Supreme Court. On June 16, the Court granted the petition. Oral arguments were heard on December 2, and the case was decided April 29, 2026.
