= FS Credit Opportunities Corp. v. Saba Capital Master Fund =

- Supreme Court of the United States

Decided June 11, 2026
- Full case name: FS Credit Opportunities Corp. v. Saba Capital Master Fund
- Docket no.: 24-345
- Citations: 608 U.S. ___ (more)

Holding
- Section 47(b) of the Investment Company Act does not impliedly empower private parties to sue for rescission of any contract that allegedly violates the act.

Court membership
- Chief Justice John Roberts Associate Justices Clarence Thomas · Samuel Alito; Sonia Sotomayor · Elena Kagan; Neil Gorsuch · Brett Kavanaugh; Amy Coney Barrett · Ketanji Brown Jackson

Case opinions
- Majority: Barrett, joined by Roberts, Thomas, Alito, Gorsuch, Kavanaugh
- Dissent: Kagan
- Dissent: Jackson, joined by Sotomayor; Kagan (Parts I & II)

Laws applied
- Investment Company Act

FS Credit Opportunities Corp. v. Saba Capital Master Fund, 608 U.S. ___ (2026), was a United States Supreme Court case in which the court held that Section 47(b) of the Investment Company Act does not impliedly empower private parties to sue for rescission of any contract that allegedly violates the act.

== Background ==
The Investment Company Act (ICA) comprehensively regulates investment companies. The ICA designates the Securities and Exchange Commission as its primary enforcer and expressly permits shareholders and issuers of securities to enforce two of its provisions. The question presented in this case is whether Section 47(b) of the ICA impliedly empowers private parties to sue for rescission of any contract that allegedly violates the Act.

Investment companies including FS Credit Opportunities Corp. (collectively, Funds) managed closed-end mutual funds. These funds were "closed" because each contained a fixed number of shares issued at one time, and the price of each share was determined by trading on the open market. Saba Capital Master Fund, Ltd., and Saba Capital Management, L. P., (collectively, Saba) engaged in activist investing—a practice that involves identifying low-performing closed-end funds and purchasing a large enough stake to alter the funds' investment strategies. The Funds were incorporated in Maryland, which has enacted the Maryland Control Share Acquisition Act (MCSAA), and have adopted resolutions opting into MCSAA provisions that limit voting rights for shareholders holding a disproportionate number of shares (like activist investors) unless other shareholders approve. In June 2023, Saba sued the Funds, alleging that the Funds' resolutions violate the ICA's requirement that every share of stock shall be a voting stock with equal voting rights. Saba's suit invoked Section 47(b) of the ICA, which provides that "a court may not deny rescission" of contracts that violate the ICA "at the instance of any party" unless the court finds that doing so would be consistent with equity and the ICA's goals. 15 U. S. C. §80a–46(b)(2). The federal District Court held that Section 47(b) creates an implied private right of action to sue for contract rescission and granted Saba summary judgment. The Second Circuit Court of Appeals summarily affirmed.

The Supreme Court granted certiorari.

== Opinion of the court ==
The Supreme Court issued an opinion on June 11, 2026.
