= Human Rights Defense Center =

U.S. nonprofit organization

- Founded: 1996; 30 years ago
- Founder: Paul Wright
- Type: Non-profit, NGO
- Purpose: Criminal justice reform, free speech
- Headquarters: Lake Worth Beach, Florida, United States
- Region served: United States
- Product: Non-profit human rights advocacy
- Key people: Paul Wright(Executive Director); Susan Schwartzkopf (Chief Financial Officer); Dan Marshall (Litigation Director)
- Website: humanrightsdefensecenter.org

Human Rights Defense Center (HRDC) is a non-profit 501(c)(3) organization that campaigns on behalf of prisoner rights across the United States. The organization advocates for the rights of people in "state and federal prisons, local jails, immigration detention centers, civil commitment facilities, Bureau of Indian Affairs jails, juvenile facilities and military prisons." Some of the major focuses of the HRDC include work on free speech issues, government transparency and accountability, as well as opposition to the private prison industry.

HRDC is also the parent organization of Prison Legal News (PLN), a monthly publication that covers litigation and other criminal justice news, which is the nation's longest running newspaper produced by and for prisoners. Through PLN, HRDC also publishes and offers books to prisoners pertaining to legal and self-help resources designed to help "prisoners navigate through the legal system" The organization is currently running a number of campaigns, including its Campaign for Prison Phone Justice, the Stop Prison Profiteering campaign, and the Prison Ecology Project. A major part of HRDC's funding is through revenue earned from its publishing and litigation, as well as book sales, but the organization also receives individual donations as well as crowdfunding efforts on its behalf.

== Notable staff ==
Members of staff include:

- Paul Wright, founder, President, executive director, Editor of PLN
- Dan Marshall, General Counsel and Litigation Director

== Founding ==
HRDC's founder, president, and executive director is Paul Wright, who is also the founding editor of Prison Legal News. In 2003 Wright, a former military policeman and a graduate of the University of Maryland, was released from prison in Washington State after having served 17 years.

Wright co-founded the monthly newsletter Prison Legal News together with Ed Mead in 1990 while still incarcerated. He first mailed it to friends, then began to distribute it more widely. During that period Wright also "successfully litigated a wide variety of censorship and public records cases against prison systems around the country... both as a plaintiff and on behalf of PLN."

== Funding ==
The HRDC is mainly funded through revenue generated from its publishing and litigation activities, largely through PLN subscriptions as well as advertising revenue that amounts to more than $165,000 annually. The organization holds fundraisers and is also supported by the following foundation funders: Community Foundation of Massachusetts, Funding Exchange, Jewish Community Fund, Open Society Foundation, Proteus Fund, Sonya Staff Foundation, Irvin Stern Foundation, and Youth Emergency Services.

== Litigation ==
The main focus of HRDC's litigation and activism is the condition of the incarcerated, and the incarceration's lasting effect on their lives. The cases brought by HRDC often involve First Amendment issues regarding prisons' attempt at censorship of Prison Legal News and other literature published or produced by PLN.

This however is not the limit of their activities. The organization has and continues to litigate plenty of cases involving "individual prisoners who suffer death by serious injury as a result unconstitutional prison or jail policies." They also file class action lawsuits aimed at stopping the financial exploitation of prisoners' and their families. Examples of cases filed:

- After learning about sporadic censorship of Prison Legal News in the U.S. Penitentiary, Administrative Maximum Facility (ADX), HRDC filed a suit on behalf of PLN against the Federal Bureau of Prisons in October 2015. The Bureau of Prisons had refused to deliver PLN's monthly issue due to it containing information "related to legal proceedings involving ADX prisoners and staff" but PLN argued that the "refusal to deliver served no legitimate penological interest." The suit resulted with the government amending its policies regarding the distribution of PLN's monthly newsletter. See: Prison Legal News'' ''v. Federal Bureau of Prisons, Case No. 15-cv-2184.
- In October 2015, Prison Legal News filed a lawsuit against the Knox County, Tennessee Sheriff for adopting a 'postcards only' mail policy; by this policy the department banned all mail sent by PLN to prisoners. PLN claimed the Sheriffs Office "refused to deliver all [PLN] publications and enveloped mail" from "November 2014 to October 6. 2015" and therefore the prisoners were denied access to PLN. See: PLN v. Knox County Sheriff, Case No. 3:15-cv-00452.
- In response to the statewide ban on Prison Legal News by the Florida Department of Corrections (FDOC), PLN filed a lawsuit in November 2014, challenging the ban. Although the FDOC changed their policy, certain private prison companies continued to censor PLN. In August 2015 "the district court ruled that FDOC's censorship of PLN was permissible but that FDOC had violated PLN's due process rights." In December 2015, PLN filed its opening brief to the Eleventh Circuit asking the court to "reverse the district court's judgment as to the First Amendment censorship claim, to affirm the court's ruling as to the due process claim and to expand the latter." See: Prison Legal News v. Secretary, Florida Department of Corrections, U.S. Court of Appeals for the Eleventh Circuit, Case No, 15-14220 & 15–14221.
- In January 2015, PLN together with other plaintiffs challenged the constitutionality of Pennsylvania's Revictimization Relief Act which "allowed victims of personal injury crimes to bring a civil action against the perpetrator of that crime, 'for conduct which perpetuates the continuing effect of the crime on the victim'." if they are able to provide evidence of mental anguish resulting from an offender exercising their free speech. The law was struck down as unconstitutional and the court ruled in favor of PLN. See: PLN v. Kane, PA, Case No. 1:15-cv-00045.

== Other activities and campaigns ==
The Campaign for Prison Phone Justice, which was co-founded by HRDC, started in 2011 in order to challenge the high fees for telephone use being charged by contractors in jails in the U.S. On October 22, 2015, the Federal Communications Commission (FCC) moved to cap the rates for prisoner phone calls in order to rein in what the FCC called "excessive rates and egregious fees on phone calls paid by some of society's most vulnerable." The US Supreme Court ruled that the FCC could not cap rates charged by contract providers but could cap associated fees for service.

The Stop Prison Profiteering Campaign (SPP) is intended to fight the financial exploitation of prisoners and aims at stopping companies who charge excessive fees when people attempt to help their incarcerated friends and family. HRDC has been working in conjunction with the Consumer Financial Protection Bureau to investigate "the fees associated with debit cards" in order to prohibit them and give "prisoners the ability to opt out of debit cards when they are released from prison."

The Prison Ecology Project (PEP) states as its mission "to map the intersections of mass incarceration and environmental degradation, and create action plans to address the multitude of problems found there." The PEP is concerned with the environmental impact of poorly regulated prison facilities, sewage systems, industrial waste and construction, on the threatened species and communities in the area.
