= Hencely v. Fluor Corp. =

- Supreme Court of the United States

Argued November 3, 2025 Decided April 22, 2026
- Full case name: Hencely v. Fluor Corp.
- Docket no.: 24-924
- Citations: 608 U.S. ___ (more)

Case history
- Prior: 120 F. 4th 412 (CA4 2024), certiorari granted, 605 U. S. 968 (2025)

Holding
- A suit in state court based on a military contractor's actions in a war zone is not preempted when the contractor was neither required nor authorized to take the challenged actions.

Court membership
- Chief Justice John Roberts Associate Justices Clarence Thomas · Samuel Alito; Sonia Sotomayor · Elena Kagan; Neil Gorsuch · Brett Kavanaugh; Amy Coney Barrett · Ketanji Brown Jackson

Case opinions
- Majority: Thomas, joined by Sotomayor, Kagan, Gorsuch, Barrett, Jackson
- Dissent: Alito, joined by Roberts, Kavanaugh

Laws applied
- Federal Tort Claims Act

Hencely v. Fluor Corp., 608 U.S. ___ (2026), was a United States Supreme Court case in which the court held that a suit in state court based on a military contractor's actions in a war zone is not preempted when the contractor was neither required nor authorized to take the challenged actions.

== Background ==
Military contractor Fluor Corporation hired Ahmad Nayeb to work at a US base in Afghanistan as part of the "Afghan First" initiative, a military program that required contractors to hire Afghans to help stimulate the local economy and stabilize the Afghan Government. Nayeb, a Taliban operative, later carried out a suicide-bomb attack at the base that killed 5 and wounded 17. The Army's investigation found Fluor primarily responsible for the attack because it negligently supervised Nayeb in complying with base procedures. Former Army specialist Winston T. Hencely, who suffered a fractured skull and brain injuries in the course of stopping Nayeb before he could reach a larger crowd, sued Fluor in the United States District Court for the District of South Carolina seeking damages under South Carolina law for negligent supervision, negligent entrustment of tools, and negligent retention of Nayeb. The federal District Court entered summary judgment for Fluor, and the Fourth Circuit Court of Appeals affirmed. It held that, during wartime, state-law claims against military contractors under military command arising out of combatant activities were preempted. The Fourth Circuit reasoned that the Federal Tort Claims Act's combatant-activities exception, which preserves the federal government's immunity against claims "arising out of the combatant activities of the military" during wartime, 28 U. S. C. §2680(j), also reflected a congressional intent to bar tort suits against contractors connected with those combatant activities, even when the contractor was alleged to have violated its instructions from the military.

The Supreme Court granted certiorari.

== Opinion of the court ==
The Supreme Court issued an opinion on April 22, 2026. The Supreme Court disagreed with the Fourth Circuit and reversed.
