= Second Chance Act (2007) =

United States federal criminal legislation

Second Chance Act of 2007
- Long title: An act to reauthorize the grant program for reentry of offenders into the community in the Omnibus Crime Control and Safe Streets Act of 1968, to improve reentry planning and implementation, and for other purposes
- Enacted by: the 110th United States Congress

Citations
- Public law: Pub. L. 110–199 (text) (PDF)
- Statutes at Large: 122 Stat. 657

Codification
- Acts amended: Omnibus Crime Control and Safe Streets Act of 1968

Legislative history
- Introduced in the House as H.R. 1593 by Danny K. Davis (D–IL) on March 20, 2007; Passed the House on November 13, 2007 (347-62); Passed the Senate on March 11, 2008 (unanimous consent); Signed into law by President George W. Bush on April 9, 2008

The Second Chance Act of 2007 (H.R. 1593), titled "To reauthorize the grant program for reentry of offenders into the community in the Omnibus Crime Control and Safe Streets Act of 1968, to improve reentry planning and implementation, and for other purposes," was submitted to the House by Representative Danny Davis (D-IL) to amend the Omnibus Crime Control and Safe Streets Act of 1968 to reauthorize, rewrite, and expand provisions for adult and juvenile offender state and local reentry demonstration projects to provide expanded services to offenders and their families for reentry into society. H.R. 1593 was signed into law April 9, 2008.

== Purpose ==
The Second Chance Act serves to reform the Omnibus Crime Control and Safe Streets Act of 1968. The purpose of the Second Chance Act is to reduce recidivism, increase public safety, and assist states and communities to address the growing population of inmates returning to communities. The focus has been placed on four areas: jobs, housing, substance abuse/mental health treatment and families. It also requires all federal facilities to document and report "the use of physical restraints on pregnant female prisoners during pregnancy, labor, delivery, and post-delivery and justify the use of restraints with documented security concerns".

== History ==
On April 20, 2005 Representative Robert Portman (R-OH2) introduced H.R.4676 and Senator Samuel Brownback (R-KS) introduced S.2789 Second Chance Act 2005 during the 108th Congressional Session however both bills died in committee. During the 109th Congressional Legislative Session, Senator Arlen Specter (D-PA) introduced S.1934 and Representative Robert Portman (R-OH2) reintroduced the Second Chance Act (2007) S 1934 without success. However, during the 110th Congressional Legislative Session, Sen. Joseph Biden (D-DE) and Representative Danny K. Davis (D-IL7) successfully ushered the passage of H.R.1593 Second Chance Act of 2007 receiving bipartisan support from 218 Democrats, 129 Republicans enacting the bill into legislation on April 9, 2008.

In 2011, Senator Patrick Leahy (D-VT) introduced S.1231 requesting reauthorization of the Second Chance Act during the 112th Congressional Legislative Session. Since that time, the submission has been placed on the Senate Legislative Calendar (July 21, 2011) where it has remained for further review. The Reauthorization of the Second Chance Act provides for the expansion of state and local reentry demonstration projects to provide expanded services to offenders and their families for reentry into society, as well as the necessary services to remain productive members of society.

As of July 2008, the United States House of Representatives appropriated $45 million while the Senate tentatively appropriated $20 million for grants authorized under the Act. The Second Chance Act provides a number of grants, over a two-year period, to state and local governments in order to:

- promote the safe and successful reintegration of offenders into the community upon their release,
- provide employment services, substance abuse treatment, housing, family programming, mentoring, victim services, and methods to improve release and relocation,
- provide mentoring services to adult and juvenile offenders,
- implement family-based treatment programs for incarcerated parents who have minor children,
- provide guidance to the Bureau of Prisons for enhanced reentry planning procedures,
- provide information on health, employment, personal finance, release requirements and community resources

The bill was reauthorized again in December of 2018 as part of the First Step Act.

== Recidivism ==
Each year, as approximately 650,000 people are released from state and federal prisons and between 10 and 12 million more are released from local jails, they struggle with substance abuse, lack of adequate education and job skills, and mental health issues, and a large number of these people return to prison within three years of their release due to inadequate services and opportunities. Two-thirds of released inmates are expected to be rearrested for a felony or serious misdemeanor within three years of release. Such high recidivism rates translate into thousands of new crimes each year.

== Jobs ==
The National Institute of Justice Reports that 60 percent of former inmates remain jobless a year after their release because of their criminal records and the low literacy levels that hamper them in their search for employment. Employment rates and earnings histories of people in prisons and jails are often low before incarceration as a result of limited education experiences, low skill levels, and the prevalence of physical and mental health problems; incarceration only exacerbates these challenges.

== Housing ==
Current laws deny housing to former offenders with drug-related convictions. A report by Human Rights Watch, No Second Chance, focuses on the unfairness of the one-strike policy in public housing. More than 10 percent of those entering prisons and jails are homeless in the months before their incarceration. For those with mental illness the rates reach 20 percent. Released prisoners with a history of shelter use were almost five times as likely to have a post-release shelter stay.

== Substance abuse/mental health treatment ==
Over a fourth of all offenses are drug-related and over 70 percent of the recidivists return to prison with drug or alcohol problems, in part because little treatment has been made available during earlier incarceration and little was made available after their release. In a study of more than 20,000 adults entering five local jails, researchers documented serious mental illness in 14.5 percent of the men and 31 percent of the women, which taken together, comprises 16.9 percent of those studied. The incidence of serious mental illness is two to four times higher among prisoners than it is in the general population.

== Measures ==
The Second Chance Act legislation authorizes federal grants to government agencies and nonprofit organizations to provide employment assistance, housing, substance abuse treatment, family programming, mentoring, victim's support and other related services that help reduce recidivism. The Second Chance Act also establishes the National Offender Re-entry Resource Center as support and a guide assisting those in search of second chance advocates. for the purpose of managing, monitoring, and disseminating information to the service providers and community organizations delivering services under the Second Chance Act.

== Funding History ==
	Budget Request	Senate	House	Final
FY2009	N/A	$20 million	$45 million	$25 million
FY2010	$100 million	$50 million	$100 million	$100 million
FY2011	$100 million	$50 million	$10 million	$70 million

== See also ==
- Second Chance Program
