= Pitchford v. Cain =

- Supreme Court of the United States

Argued March 31, 2026 Decided May 28, 2026
- Full case name: Pitchford v. Cain
- Docket no.: 24-7351
- Citations: 608 U.S. ___ (more)

Case history
- Prior: 706 F. Supp. 3d 614 (N.D. Miss. 2023)

Holding
- After a prosecutor responds to a Batson challenge by asserting race-neutral reasons for a peremptory strike, the defense counsel must always have an opportunity to argue that the asserted race-neutral reasons were pretextual.

Court membership
- Chief Justice John Roberts Associate Justices Clarence Thomas · Samuel Alito; Sonia Sotomayor · Elena Kagan; Neil Gorsuch · Brett Kavanaugh; Amy Coney Barrett · Ketanji Brown Jackson

Case opinions
- Majority: Kavanaugh, joined by Roberts, Sotomayor, Kagan, Jackson
- Dissent: Gorsuch, joined by Thomas, Alito, Barrett

Laws applied
- Batson v. Kentucky; Antiterrorism and Effective Death Penalty Act of 1996

Pitchford v. Cain, 608 U.S. ___ (2026), was a United States Supreme Court case in which the court held that, after a prosecutor responds to a Batson challenge by asserting race-neutral reasons for a peremptory strike, the defense counsel must always have an opportunity to argue that the asserted race-neutral reasons were pretextual.

== Background ==
In 2004, two Black teenagers, Terry Pitchford and Eric Bullins, robbed a grocery store near Grenada, Mississippi. During the robbery, Bullins shot and killed the white store owner. Bullins reached a plea agreement and received a 20-year sentence for the homicide. The state charged Pitchford with capital murder and sought the death penalty. During jury selection at Pitchford's trial, the prosecutor used peremptory strikes against four of the five Black potential jurors.

The Supreme Court held in Batson v. Kentucky (1986) that the Equal Protection Clause bars prosecutors from exercising peremptory challenges based on race. In Batson and subsequent cases, the Supreme Court created a three-step process for a trial court to determine whether a prosecutor employed a peremptory challenge based on race.

Pitchford's counsel raised an objection under Batson and made a prima facie showing that the strikes of the four Black jurors were based on race (step one). The trial court asked the prosecutor for race-neutral reasons for each strike, and the prosecutor offered reasons (step two). The trial court declared the prosecutor's stated reasons to be race neutral. However, the trial court did not afford defense counsel an opportunity to rebut the prosecutor's race-neutral reasons as pretextual (step three), nor did it make any findings regarding whether the prosecutor's stated reasons were pretextual. At the close of jury selection, defense counsel sought to raise the Batson issue again, but the trial court twice cut off defense counsel. The empaneled jury, consisting of 11 white jurors and 1 black juror, convicted Pitchford of capital murder and sentenced him to death.

On direct appeal, the Mississippi Supreme Court concluded that Pitchford had waived his Batson objection by not arguing to the trial court that the prosecutor's proffered explanations were pretextual. Pitchford later filed a habeas corpus petition in federal District Court. Applying the applicable standard to obtain federal habeas relief under the Antiterrorism and Effective Death Penalty Act of 1996, the District Court concluded that the Mississippi Supreme Court had unreasonably applied Batson and had unreasonably determined that Pitchford waived his Batson objection. The District Court explained that no state court had conducted the full three-step Batson inquiry and that the trial court had "thwarted" the "attempt by Pitchford's counsel to argue pretext." The Fifth Circuit Court of Appeals reversed the District Court, concluding that the Mississippi Supreme Court's waiver finding was reasonable.

The Supreme Court granted certiorari.

== Opinion of the court ==
The Supreme Court issued an opinion on May 28, 2026. The result was a 5-4 majority opinion. The conviction and death penalty for Terry Pitchford was overturned. The high court had ruled that the state court failed to properly evaluate whether the prosecution used racially discriminatory methods during the selection of the jury. This verdict was delivered by associate justice Brett Kavanaugh.
