= Hunter v. United States =

- Supreme Court of the United States

Decided June 18, 2026
- Full case name: Hunter v. United States
- Docket no.: 24-1063
- Citations: 608 U.S. ___ (more)

Holding
- An appeal waiver included in a plea bargain is unenforceable when it would result in a miscarriage of justice.

Court membership
- Chief Justice John Roberts Associate Justices Clarence Thomas · Samuel Alito; Sonia Sotomayor · Elena Kagan; Neil Gorsuch · Brett Kavanaugh; Amy Coney Barrett · Ketanji Brown Jackson

Case opinions
- Majority: Kagan, joined by Roberts, Alito, Sotomayor, Gorsuch, Kavanaugh, Barrett, Jackson
- Concurrence: Gorsuch, joined by Sotomayor, Jackson
- Concurrence: Kavanaugh, joined by Alito, Barrett
- Concurrence: Barrett
- Dissent: Thomas

Hunter v. United States, 608 U.S. ___ (2026), was a United States Supreme Court case in which the court held that an appeal waiver included in a plea bargain is unenforceable when it would result in a miscarriage of justice. That is, "when it would leave in place the kind of egregious error that would bring the judicial system into disrepute."

== Background ==
Munson Hunter III was charged with 10 counts of bank and wire fraud for a years-long scheme costing various financial institutions about half a million dollars. He entered into a written plea agreement with the government under which he pleaded guilty to one count of aiding and abetting wire fraud in exchange for dismissal of the remaining nine charges and a promise not to prosecute him for the described conduct in the future. The agreement included an appeal waiver under which Hunter waived the right to appeal his conviction and sentence, except that he did not waive the right to raise a claim of ineffective assistance of counsel. The agreement further provided that "any modification" of its terms "must be in writing and signed by all parties." The federal District Court accepted the plea after deeming it knowing and voluntary.

At sentencing, the probation office recommended that as a condition of supervised release Hunter be required to participate in a mental-health treatment program and take all mental-health medications prescribed by his treating physician. Hunter objected to the mandatory-medication part of that condition. The District Court told Hunter that if "the treatment provider prescribes drugs, you should take them," while also telling Hunter that he could "address" any future dispute about medication "to the probation officer" or, if needed, "to me." The District Court then imposed a sentence of 51 months in prison followed by three years of supervised release, including the contested medication condition. At the close of the hearing, the court told Hunter: "All right. You have a right to appeal. If you wish to appeal, [your trial counsel] will continue to represent you." When asked if either party wished to say anything else, Hunter's lawyer said "Nothing from the defense," and the prosecutor replied: "Your Honor, I believe—well, no. I—no."

Hunter appealed, challenging the mandatory-medication condition as infringing on his "fundamental due process liberty interest in being free of unwanted mental health medication." The government sought dismissal based on the appeal waiver. Hunter acknowledged he had knowingly and voluntarily signed the waiver but argued that an appeal waiver is unenforceable when the disputed aspect of a sentence violates a fundamental constitutional right, and alternatively that the District Court's statement at sentencing about appeal rights, along with the prosecutor's failure to object, voided the waiver. The Court of Appeals for the Fifth Circuit dismissed the appeal, holding that the District Court's misstatement "did not impact the validity of the appeal waiver" and that under Circuit precedent the "general rule" that appeal waivers are enforceable has only two exceptions: when the waiver was tainted by ineffective assistance of counsel and when the sentence exceeded the statutory maximum. Because neither exception applied, the Fifth Circuit held that Hunter's appeal could not go forward.

The Supreme Court granted certiorari.

== Opinion of the court ==
The Supreme Court issued an opinion on June 18, 2026.

Justice Gorsuch's concurrence, joined by Justices Sotomayor and Jackson, discussed systemic issues regarding the plea bargaining process. He recounted that the trial court had not just sentenced Hunter based on the conduct the he had admitted (a single theft of $38,648.77); it sentenced him based on the totality of the conduct of which he had been accused (several thefts totaling $488,352.25). This increased Hunter's sentence significantly. Gorsuch summarized this by observing that "A guilty plea to a single charge enabled prosecutors to secure a punishment based on other charges they had agreed to drop or had not even brought." He then discussed the development of the plea bargaining process over the twentieth century, from something considered highly unusual to a practice the Supreme Court described as "highly desirable" in Santobello v. New York (1971). He concluded, "Today, the Court finally begins to correct course, taking an important step toward reining in appeal waivers. It is not a solution to all of plea bargaining’s excesses, and perhaps not even those associated with appeal waivers. But it is a start."
