= M & K Employee Solutions, LLC v. Trustees of the IAM National Pension Fund =

- Supreme Court of the United States

Argued January 20, 2026 Decided May 21, 2026
- Full case name: M & K Employee Solutions, LLC, et al., Petitioners v. Trustees of the IAM National Pension Fund
- Docket no.: 23-1209
- Citations: 608 U.S. ___ (more)
- Argument: Oral argument

Case history
- Prior: Arbitral awards vacated.; 1. Trs. of the IAM Nat’l Pension Fund v. Ohio Magnetics, Inc., No. 21-cv-928 (D.D.C. 2023).; 2. Trs. of the IAM Nat’l Pension Fund v. Toyota Logistics Servs., Inc., No. 21-cv-931 (D.D.C. 2023).; 3. Trs. of the IAM Nat’l Pension Fund v. Phillips Liquidating Tr., No. 21-cv-2132 (D.D.C. 2023).; 4. Trs. of the IAM Nat’l Pension Fund v. M & K Emp. Sols., LLC, 656 F. Supp. 3d 112 (D.D.C. 2022).; Affirmed. 92 F.4th 316 (D.C. Cir. 2024).; Cert. granted. 606 U.S. ___ (2025).

Questions presented
- Whether 29 U.S.C. 1391's instruction to compute withdrawal liability "as of the end of the plan year" requires the plan to base the computation on the actuarial assumptions to which its actuary subscribed at the end of the year, or allows the plan to use different actuarial assumptions that were adopted after the end of the year.

Holding
- The provisions of ERISA governing the calculation of withdrawal liability—§§1391 and 1393—do not require the actuarial assumptions underlying that calculation to be selected on or before the measurement date.

Court membership
- Chief Justice John Roberts Associate Justices Clarence Thomas · Samuel Alito; Sonia Sotomayor · Elena Kagan; Neil Gorsuch · Brett Kavanaugh; Amy Coney Barrett · Ketanji Brown Jackson

Case opinion
- Majority: Jackson, joined by unanimous

Laws applied
- Employee Retirement Income Security Act of 1974.

M & K Employee Solutions, LLC v. Trustees of the IAM National Pension Fund, 608 U.S. ___ (2026), was a United States Supreme Court case in which the court held that the provisions of ERISA governing the calculation of withdrawal liability do not require the actuarial assumptions underlying that calculation to be selected on or before the measurement date.

== Background ==
The Employee Retirement Income Security Act of 1974 (ERISA) is an act passed by Congress "to provide comprehensive regulation for private pension plans.” Congress later amended ERISA by enacting the Multiemployer Pension Plan Amendments Act of 1980 (MPPAA). Prior to the passage of MPPAA, employers enrolled in multi-employer pension plans would often exit the plan as soon as it headed to insolvency. Under this regime, “a plan’s financial troubles could trigger a stampede for the exit doors, thereby ensuring the plan’s demise.” MPPAA solved this problem by requiring all withdrawing employers to pay their share of the plan's underfunding. Though MPPAA allows multiple ways of calculating an employer's withdrawal liability, each method requires that the liability be calculated "as of the end of the plan year" preceding the year in which the employer withdraws from the plan. The final day of such year is often called the "measurement date."

=== Lower court history ===
Petitioners are four companies that withdrew from the IAM National Pension Fund ("the Fund") in 2018. In November 2017, the plan actuary used a 7.5% interest rate or "discount rate" to value the plan's underfunding. However, when the actuary later calculated the companies’ withdrawal liability, it used a 6.5% discount rate. The actuary had changed several of its actuarial assumptions as a result of a January 24, 2018 meeting with the trustees of the Fund. Using the 7.5% rate, the actuary calculated the plan's underfunding for the 2016 plan year as just over $448 million. Using the 6.5% rate, the underfunding increased to over $3 billion for the 2017 plan year. At arbitration, the Fund's actuary was found to have violated ERISA by calculating the companies' withdrawal liability using actuarial assumptions that postdated the December 31, 2017 measurement date. In reaching this conclusion, the arbitrators relied on the holding of the United States Court of Appeals for the Second Circuit in National Retirement Fund v. Metz Culinary Management, Inc. (Metz), which held that actuaries must calculate withdrawal liability using the actuarial assumptions that they endorsed as of the measurement date.

The Fund moved to vacate the arbitral awards by filing suit in the United States District Court for the District of Columbia. The District Court vacated the awards, holding that the arbitrators had erred in relying on Metz. The United States Court of Appeals for the District of Columbia Circuit affirmed. It too held that the arbitrators' reliance on Metz was erroneous, and that Metz was neither persuasive nor controlling precedent in the D.C. Circuit.

== Supreme Court ==
On May 9, 2024, the companies petitioned the Supreme Court for a writ of certiorari. On June 30, 2025, the court granted review of the following question: "Whether 29 U.S.C. 1391's instruction to compute withdrawal liability "as of the end of the plan year" requires the plan to base the computation on the actuarial assumptions to which its actuary subscribed at the end of the year, or allows the plan to use different actuarial assumptions that were adopted after the end of the year. On July 3, the court altered the question slightly: "Whether 29 U. S. C. §1391’s instruction to compute withdrawal liability 'as of the end of the plan year' requires the plan to base the computation on the actuarial assumptions most recently adopted before the end of the year, or allows the plan to use different actuarial assumptions that were adopted after, but based on information available as of, the end of the year."

Oral arguments were heard on January 20, 2026. The case was argued by Michael E. Kenneally Jr. (for the petitioners), John E. Roberts (Note: No relation to Chief Justice John Roberts. See Tr. of Oral Arg. 36.) (for the respondents), and Kevin J. Barber (for the United States, as amicus curiae in support of respondents).

The court issued an opinion on May 21, 2026. Written by Justice Ketanji Brown Jackson, the opinion was unanimous.
