= Flowers Foods, Inc. v. Brock =

- Supreme Court of the United States

Decided May 28, 2026
- Full case name: Flowers Foods, Inc. v. Brock
- Docket no.: 24-935
- Citations: 608 U.S. ___ (more)

Holding
- A worker who contributes to the intrastate leg of an interstate journey can qualify for the Federal Arbitration Act's exemption under Section 1 without crossing state lines or interacting with any vehicles that do.

Court membership
- Chief Justice John Roberts Associate Justices Clarence Thomas · Samuel Alito; Sonia Sotomayor · Elena Kagan; Neil Gorsuch · Brett Kavanaugh; Amy Coney Barrett · Ketanji Brown Jackson

Case opinion
- Majority: Gorsuch, joined by unanimous

Laws applied
- Federal Arbitration Act

Flowers Foods, Inc. v. Brock, 608 U.S. ___ (2026), was a United States Supreme Court case in which the court held that a worker who contributes to the intrastate leg of an interstate journey can qualify for the Federal Arbitration Act's exemption under Section 1 without crossing state lines or interacting with any vehicles that do.

== Background ==
The Federal Arbitration Act (FAA) requires courts to enforce many private arbitration agreements, but Section 1 of the act also provides that "nothing" in the law shall be used to compel arbitration in disputes involving the "contracts of employment" of any class of workers "engaged in... interstate commerce."

Flowers Foods, Inc., was a large producer of packaged baked goods with bakeries in 19 States. To get its products to market, the company depended in part on franchisees who bought the distribution rights to Flowers's products in specific geographic territories. Angelo Brock was one such franchisee serving the Denver area; he picked up Flowers's products from a warehouse in Colorado and delivered them to local stores, all without leaving the State. In 2022, Brock sued Flowers in federal district court alleging that the company had underpaid him and other distributors in violation of various federal and state laws. Flowers moved to compel arbitration, arguing that the FAA generally requires courts to stay or dismiss cases when the parties have agreed to resolve their disputes by arbitration and that Brock had signed a distribution agreement promising to arbitrate any disagreement. The district court denied Flowers's motion, and the Tenth Circuit Court of Appeals affirmed. Resting its decision on Section 1, the Tenth Circuit reasoned that Brock belonged to a class of workers engaged in interstate commerce and thus the court lacked authority to compel arbitration.

The case posed the question whether someone can qualify as a worker under the §1 exemption if they never crossed state lines and never interacted with vehicles that did.

The Supreme Court granted certiorari.

== Opinion of the court ==
The Supreme Court issued an opinion on May 28, 2026.
