= Enbridge Energy, LP v. Nessel =

- Supreme Court of the United States

Decided April 22, 2026
- Full case name: Enbridge Energy, LP v. Nessel
- Docket no.: 24-783
- Citations: 608 U.S. ___ (more)

Holding
- The 30-day deadline for removing a lawsuit to federal court in 28 U.S.C. §1446(b)(1) cannot be equitably tolled.

Court membership
- Chief Justice John Roberts Associate Justices Clarence Thomas · Samuel Alito; Sonia Sotomayor · Elena Kagan; Neil Gorsuch · Brett Kavanaugh; Amy Coney Barrett · Ketanji Brown Jackson

Case opinion
- Majority: Sotomayor, joined by unanimous

Laws applied
- 28 U.S.C. §1446(b)(1)

Enbridge Energy, LP v. Nessel, 608 U.S. ___ (2026), was a United States Supreme Court case in which the court held that the 30-day deadline for removing a lawsuit to federal court in 28 U.S.C. §1446(b)(1) cannot be equitably tolled.

== Background ==
Petitioners (collectively Enbridge) owned and operated Line 5, a 645-mile petroleum pipeline, 4 miles of which traverse the Straits of Mackinac pursuant to a 1953 easement granted to Enbridge's predecessor by the State of Michigan. On June 27, 2019, the Michigan Attorney General filed suit in Michigan state court seeking to halt Enbridge's operation of Line 5 by having the 1953 easement declared void and Enbridge's continuing operations declared unlawful. Enbridge was served with the complaint on July 12, 2019. Rather than removing the case to federal court within the 30-day deadline required by 28 U.S.C. §1446(b)(1), Enbridge litigated in state court for months. In November 2020, more than a year after Enbridge's removal deadline had lapsed, Michigan Governor Gretchen Whitmer issued a notice revoking the 1953 easement and filed a separate lawsuit in state court against Enbridge. In that suit, unlike in the Attorney General's suit, Enbridge timely removed to federal court, and the parties agreed to hold the Attorney General's case in abeyance while federal proceedings progressed. After the District Court denied the Governor's motion to remand, finding federal-question jurisdiction satisfied, the Governor voluntarily dismissed her lawsuit. On December 15, 2021—887 days after receiving the Attorney General's complaint—Enbridge removed this action to federal court. The Attorney General moved to remand, arguing that removal was untimely under §1446(b)'s 30-day deadline. The District Court denied the motion, holding that equitable principles justified excusing Enbridge's untimely removal, and certified its order for interlocutory appeal. The Sixth Circuit Court of Appeals reversed, holding that although §1446(b)(1)'s deadline is nonjurisdictional, several features of §1446(b)(1) and the overall removal scheme rebutted any presumption of equitable tolling. Thus, the lawsuit had to be remanded to the Michigan state court.

The Supreme Court granted certiorari to resolve a divide among the courts of appeals over whether §1446(b)(1) was subject to equitable tolling.

== Opinion of the court ==
The Supreme Court issued an opinion on April 22, 2026.
