= Hikma Pharmaceuticals USA Inc. v. Amarin Pharma, Inc. =

- Supreme Court of the United States

Decided June 4, 2026
- Full case name: Hikma Pharmaceuticals USA Inc. v. Amarin Pharma, Inc.
- Docket no.: 24-889
- Citations: 608 U.S. ___ (more)

Holding
- The necessary inducement element of a patent infringement claim must be clear to the relevant audience and affirmative.

Court membership
- Chief Justice John Roberts Associate Justices Clarence Thomas · Samuel Alito; Sonia Sotomayor · Elena Kagan; Neil Gorsuch · Brett Kavanaugh; Amy Coney Barrett · Ketanji Brown Jackson

Case opinion
- Majority: Jackson, joined by unanimous

Hikma Pharmaceuticals USA Inc. v. Amarin Pharma, Inc., 608 U.S. ___ (2026), was a United States Supreme Court case in which the court held that the necessary inducement element of a patent infringement claim must be clear to the relevant audience and affirmative.
