= Rutherford v. United States =

Rutherford v. United States Carter v. United States
- Supreme Court of the United States

Argued November, 2025
- Full case name: Rutherford v. United States
- Docket nos.: 24-820; 24-860
- Citations: 608 U.S. ___ (more)

Case history
- Prior: Rutherford v. United States, No. 24-820.; Defendant convicted. United States v. Rutherford, 05-cr-126 (E.D. Pa. 2006).; Convictions affirmed. 236 F. App’x 835 (3d Cir. 2007).; Cert. denied. 552 U.S. 1127 (2008).; Compassionate release denied. 05-cr-126 (E.D. Pa. 2023).; Affirmed. 120 F.4th 360 (3d Cir. 2024).; Cert. granted. 605 U.S. ___ (2025).; Carter v. United States, No. 24-860.; Defendant convicted. United States v. Carter, 07-cr-374 (E.D. Pa. 2011).; Convictions affirmed. No. 11-3377 (3d Cir. 2014).; Compassionate release denied. 07-cr-374 (E.D. Pa. 2024).; Affirmed. No. 24-1115 (3d Cir. 2024).; Cert. granted. 605 U.S. ___ (2025).

Questions presented
- 1. Whether, as four circuits permit but six others prohibit, a district court may consider disparities created by the First Step Act's prospective changes in sentencing law when deciding if "extraordinary and compelling reasons" warrant a sentence reduction under 18 U.S.C. § 3582(c)(1)(A)(i).; 2. Whether the Sentencing Commission acted within its expressly delegated authority by permitting district courts to consider, in narrowly cabined circumstances, a nonretroactive change in law in determining whether "extraordinary and compelling reasons" warrant a sentence reduction.

Holding
- The First Step Act's amendments to 18 U.S.C. § 924(c) are not retroactively "extraordinary and compelling reasons" for granting compassionate release.

Court membership
- Chief Justice John Roberts Associate Justices Clarence Thomas · Samuel Alito; Sonia Sotomayor · Elena Kagan; Neil Gorsuch · Brett Kavanaugh; Amy Coney Barrett · Ketanji Brown Jackson

Case opinions
- Majority: Barrett, joined by Roberts, Thomas, Alito, Gorsuch, Kavanaugh
- Dissent: Sotomayor, joined by Kagan, Jackson

Rutherford v. United States (consolidated with Carter v. United States), 608 U.S. 454 (2026), was a United States Supreme Court case regarding federal sentencing laws. The Court held the First Step Act's amendments to 18 U.S.C. § 924(c) are not retroactively "extraordinary and compelling reasons" for granting compassionate release.

== Background ==
=== Legal background ===
Prior to 1984, federal criminal sentencing was carried out by all three branches of government. Under this scheme, Congress was responsible for defining statutory maximum sentences, courts were responsible for imposing sentences consistent with those maxima, and the Executive—through the United States Parole Commission—determined the actual period of incarceration. This resulted in wide disparities in actual sentences served for a given crime—

If, for example, a judge imposed a prison term of 15 years, the Parole Commission might have released the prisoner after only 5 years. And it routinely did so. See United States Sentencing Commission, Guidelines Manual § 1A3, p. s., p. 1.2 (Oct. 1987) (USSG) (“[D]efendants often serv[ed] only about one-third of the sentence handed down by the court”). The result was “confusion and implicit deception.” Ibid.

— Barber v. Thomas, 560 U.S. 474, 482 (2010)

Congress responded by enacting the Sentencing Reform Act, part of the Comprehensive Crime Control Act of 1984. The Act created the United States Sentencing Commission (USSC), an independent agency charged with crafting the United States Sentencing Guidelines. In the 1984 Act, Congress authorized the USSC to open "safety valves" to reduce an inmate's sentence in the presence of "extraordinary and compelling reasons" upon a motion of the Bureau of Prisons (BOP). Congress delegated to the USSC the authority to define what qualified as "extraordinary and compelling reasons."

In 2018, Congress passed the First Step Act, a bipartisan criminal justice reform law. Section 603 of the Act removed the conditioning of safety valve relief upon the action of the BOP. Instead, individual prisoners could themselves petition for compassionate release upon exhaustion of other administrative remedies.

Section 403 of the First Step Act clarified the sentencing requirements under 18 U.S.C. 924(c). Section 924(c) prohibits carrying or using a firearm during certain felonies. Prior to the First Step Act, the section carried a 5-year mandatory minimum penalty for carrying (or a 7-year mandatory minimum for brandishing) a firearm during a felony upon a defendant's first conviction, and a 25-year mandatory minimum penalty for carrying a firearm during a felony upon a defendant's "second or subsequent" conviction, even if they occurred in the same case as the defendant's first conviction. The First Step Act changed this practice by requiring that a defendant's first § 924(c) conviction be "final" before applying the 25-year mandatory minimum in future cases. However, Congress only applied this new standard to cases that were pending as of or subsequent to the enactment of the Act.

=== Rutherford ===
In 2003, Daniel Rutherford committed two armed robberies in Philadelphia. Rutherford was convicted in the Eastern District of Pennsylvania of one count of Hobbs Act conspiracy, two counts of Hobbs Act robbery, and two counts of carrying and brandishing a firearm during a crime of violence (in violation of 18 U.S.C. § 924(c)). For his firearms convictions, Rutherford received stacked 7- and 25-year sentences, to run consecutively to each other and to any other sentences. For his Hobbs Act convictions, Rutherford was sentenced to 125 months' imprisonment, for a total sentence of 42.5 years. The Third Circuit affirmed, and the Supreme Court denied certiorari. In his concurring opinion in the Court of Appeals, Judge Thomas Ambro said:

[B]y prosecuting Daniel Rutherford for two Hobbs Act violations in which he brandished firearms, the Government achieved a mandatory 32-year sentence for the gun crimes, and a Guidelines-recommended range of 10–12 additional years for the Hobbs Act violations. Thus, we have Rutherford’s 42-year sentence—a length that would be unthinkable in many state systems for these underlying facts.

— United States v. Rutherford, 236 F. App’x 835 (3d Cir. 2007) (Ambro, J., concurring).

In 2021, Rutherford moved pro se for compassionate release under the First Step Act. He argued that his sentence was significantly longer than one that would be received for a first-time offender after the First Step Act, and that this disparity is an "extraordinary and compelling reason" for granting safety valve relief, notwithstanding the Act's non-retroactivity. The district court denied Rutherford's petition. Its decision relied on United States v. Andrews (3d Cir. 2021), which held that district courts may not consider the First Step Act’s non-retroactive changes to § 924(c) when deciding if a defendant’s circumstances are “extraordinary and compelling.” The following day, the Sentencing Commission passed revised guidance indicating that sentencing disparities could indicate the presence of extraordinary or compelling reasons. On appeal, the Third Circuit affirmed the denial of Rutherford's petition. The Court of Appeals held that, given Congress express denial of retroactive relief under the First Step Act, Andrews still controlled notwithstanding the USSC's guidance to the contrary.

=== Carter ===
In 2011, Johnnie Markel Carter was convicted in the Eastern District of Pennsylvania of bank robbery and firearms offenses. For his crimes, Carter (then 29 years old) was sentenced to 70 years' imprisonment—13 years for the bank robberies and 57 (equal to 7 and 25 and 25) years for three stacked § 924(c) convictions. In light of the Sentencing Commission's 2021 guidance, Carter moved for compassionate release. The district court, also relying on Andrews, denied Carter's motion, holding that the Commission could not abrogate the clear text of the First Step Act's non-retroactivity provision. Carter appealed to the Third Circuit. While his appeal was pending, the Court of Appeals decided Rutherford's case, holding that Andrews foreclosed the Commission's new guidance as to the First Step Act. Based on that conclusion, the Third Circuit affirmed the denial of Carter's motion.

== Supreme Court ==
On January 30, 2025, Rutherford petitioned the Supreme Court for review. On February 11, Carter also petitioned the Court for review. Both petitions argued that the United States Sentencing Commission validly authorized courts to consider pre- and post-First Step Act sentencing disparities in its new guidance. The petitions also both pointed out that the Courts of Appeals were split on the question of whether non-retroactive sentencing changes may be considered in the "extraordinary and compelling" analysis. The First, Fourth, Ninth, and Tenth Circuits did so allow, while the Third, Sixth, Seventh, Eighth, and D.C. Circuits did not.

On June 6, the Supreme Court granted both petitions, and consolidated the two cases. Oral arguments were heard on November 12, 2025. A ruling was issued on May 28, 2026 in favor of the United States.
