= Sripetch v. SEC =

- Supreme Court of the United States

Decided June 4, 2026
- Full case name: Sripetch v. SEC
- Docket no.: 25-466
- Citations: 608 U.S. ___ (more)

Holding
- A showing of pecuniary loss to investors is not required before the SEC may obtain a disgorgement award.

Court membership
- Chief Justice John Roberts Associate Justices Clarence Thomas · Samuel Alito; Sonia Sotomayor · Elena Kagan; Neil Gorsuch · Brett Kavanaugh; Amy Coney Barrett · Ketanji Brown Jackson

Case opinion
- Majority: Gorsuch, joined by unanimous

Sripetch v. SEC, 608 U.S. ___ (2026), was a United States Supreme Court case in which the court held that a showing of pecuniary loss to investors is not required before the Securities and Exchange Commission may obtain a disgorgement award.

== Background ==
Ongkaruck Sripetch engaged in numerous fraudulent schemes involving at least 20 penny-stock companies. On discovering the schemes, the Securities and Exchange Commission (SEC) brought a civil enforcement action against Mr. Sripetch, charging him with six counts of securities fraud and one count of selling unregistered securities. Mr. Sripetch consented to the entry of judgment against him and agreed that the court could order disgorgement. When the SEC proceeded to seek over $4.1 million in disgorgement, however, Mr. Sripetch objected. He argued that the SEC's request violated Liu v. SEC, because the SEC lacked evidence that his schemes caused investors to suffer any financial losses. On appeal, the Ninth Circuit Court of Appeals rejected Mr. Sripetch's argument, deepening a split among the courts of appeals.

The Supreme Court granted certiorari.

== Opinion of the court ==
The Supreme Court issued an opinion on June 4, 2026.
