= Judicial estoppel =

Legal device

In the common law, judicial estoppel (also known as estoppel by inconsistent positions) is an estoppel that precludes a party from taking a position in a case that is contrary to a position it has taken in earlier legal proceedings. Although, in the United States, it is only a part of common law and therefore not sharply defined, it is generally agreed that it can only be cited if the party in question successfully maintained its position in the earlier proceedings and benefited from it.

== In U.S. case law ==
Judicial estoppel is a doctrine that may apply in matters involving closed bankruptcies, wherein the former debtor attempts to lay claim to an asset that was not disclosed on the bankruptcy schedules. In an early U.S. articulation of the doctrine, the United States Supreme Court, in First National Bank of Jacksboro v. Lasater, 196 U.S. 115 (1905), held at 119:

It cannot be that a bankrupt, by omitting to schedule and withholding from his trustee all knowledge of certain property, can, after his estate in bankruptcy has been finally closed up, immediately thereafter assert title to the property on the ground that the trustee had never taken any action in respect to it. If the claim was of value (as certainly this claim was, according to the judgment below), it was something to which the creditors were entitled, and this bankrupt could not, by withholding knowledge of its existence, obtain a release from his debts and still assert title to the property.

The principle was used in 2001 by a unanimous U.S. Supreme Court in the Piscataqua River border dispute, in which New Hampshire argued that the Portsmouth Naval Shipyard was in New Hampshire after having previously joined a consent decree that agreed on a border that would put it in Maine. In a concurring opinion in the case of Keathley v. Buddy Ayers Construction, Inc., 608 U.S. ___ (2026), Justice Clarence Thomas criticized the doctrine, writing that it "appears to have no basis in any statute, any Federal Rule of Civil Procedure, or any traditional inherent power of federal courts."
