= List of United States Supreme Court cases, volume 608 =

This is a list of all the United States Supreme Court cases from volume 608 of the United States Reports:

Note: As of December 2025, final bound volumes for the U.S. Supreme Court's United States Reports have been published through volume 585 (June 2018). Newer cases from subsequent future volumes do not yet have official page numbers and typically use three underscores in place of the page number; e.g., Example v. United States, 700 U.S. ___ (2050).

Case name	Docket no.	Date decided
Chevron USA Inc. v. Plaquemines Parish	24–813	April 17, 2026
Chevron demonstrated a connection between its crude oil production and its federal wartime aviation fuel production, thus qualifying for removal to federal courts.
District of Columbia v. R.W.	25–248	April 20, 2026
When determining whether an officer had reasonable suspicion, the totality of the circumstances standard prohibits the evaluation and rejection of factors in isolation from each other.
Hencely v. Fluor Corp.	24–924	April 22, 2026
A suit in state court based on a military contractor's actions in a war zone is not preempted when the contractor was neither required nor authorized to take the challenged actions.
Enbridge Energy, LP v. Nessel	24–783	April 22, 2026
The 30-day deadline for removing a lawsuit to federal court in 28 U.S.C. §1446(b)(1) cannot be equitably tolled.
Louisiana v. Callais	24–109	April 29, 2026
Compliance with the Voting Rights Act did not require Louisiana to use race as the basis for redistricting. No compelling State interest justified the use of race in creating SB8, and that map is an unconstitutional racial gerrymander.
First Choice Women's Resource Centers, Inc. v. Davenport	24–781	April 29, 2026
Federal courts can review constitutional challenges to state investigative subpoenas, particularly when the aggrieved party claims that the subpoena violates the First Amendment. That sort of claim can satisfy the standing requirement.
Jules v. Andre Balazs Properties	25–83	May 14, 2026
After a federal court has stayed claims in a pending action under Section 3 of the Federal Arbitration Act, that court has jurisdiction to confirm or vacate a resulting arbitral award on those claims under Sections 9 and 10 of the act.
Montgomery v. Caribe Transport II, LLC	24–1238	May 14, 2026
A claim that one company negligently hired another to transport goods is not preempted by the Federal Aviation Administration Authorization Act because states retain authority to regulate safety “with respect to motor vehicles” under the act.
Havana Docks Corp. v. Royal Caribbean Cruises, Ltd.	24–983	May 21, 2026
The "property which was confiscated" in the Helms–Burton Act can refer both to the physical property and the plaintiff's interest in that property. Therefore, the property is tainted such that anyone who uses the property can be liable to those who had an interest in the tainted property when it was confiscated.
M & K Employee Solutions, LLC v. Trustees of the IAM National Pension Fund	23–1209	May 21, 2026
The provisions of ERISA governing the calculation of withdrawal liability do not require the actuarial assumptions underlying that calculation to be selected on or before the measurement date.
Hamm v. Smith	24–872	May 21, 2026
Dismissed as improvidently granted.
Margolin v. NAIJ	25–767	May 26, 2026
Reversed because the circuit court vacated and remanded based on an issue the parties had not raised, violating the principle of party presentation.
Flowers Foods, Inc. v. Brock	24–935	May 28, 2026
A worker who contributes to the intrastate leg of an interstate journey can qualify for the Federal Arbitration Act's exemption under Section 1 without crossing state lines or interacting with any vehicles that do.
Pitchford v. Cain	24–7351	May 28, 2026
After a prosecutor responds to a Batson challenge by asserting race-neutral reasons for a peremptory strike, the defense counsel must always have an opportunity to argue that the asserted race-neutral reasons were pretextual.
Fernandez v. United States	24–556	May 28, 2026
An incarcerated person who collaterally attacks the validity of his conviction must proceed through 28 U.S.C. §2255, not 18 U.S.C. §3582; the supposed invalidity of a conviction is not among the "extraordinary and compelling reasons" that justify compassionate release.
Rutherford v. United States	24–820	May 28, 2026
The First Step Act's amendments to 18 U.S.C. § 924(c) are not retroactively "extraordinary and compelling reasons" for granting compassionate release.
Whitton v. Dixon	25–580	June 1, 2026
Appellate courts cannot consider evidence that was not presented at trial when making a harmless error determination about how the jury would have been affected by evidence that was admitted at trial.
Allen v. Milligan	25A1314	June 2, 2026
While federal courts should not impose changes close to an election, states are free to decide for themselves whether last-minute changes to an election are in their best interests.
FCC v. AT&T Inc.	25–406	June 4, 2026
Because forfeiture orders issued under §503(b)(4) do not definitively resolve the parties' legal obligations, and the FCC's factual findings in forfeiture proceedings are not conclusive, it does not violate the Seventh Amendment for the FCC to issue forfeiture orders without a jury trial.
Sripetch v. SEC	25–466	June 4, 2026
A showing of pecuniary loss to investors is not required before the SEC may obtain a disgorgement award.
Hikma Pharmaceuticals USA Inc. v. Amarin Pharma, Inc.	24–889	June 4, 2026
The necessary inducement element of a patent infringement claim must be clear to the relevant audience and affirmative.
Abouammo v. United States	25–5146	June 11, 2026
A person charged with violating §1519 must be tried in the district where the falsification occurred; they cannot be tried in a different district where the investigation was located because no "conduct constituting the offense" happened there.
FS Credit Opportunities Corp. v. Saba Capital Master Fund	24–345	June 11, 2026
Section 47(b) of the Investment Company Act does not impliedly empower private parties to sue for rescission of any contract that allegedly violates the act.
Keathley v. Buddy Ayers Construction, Inc.	25–6	June 11, 2026
To determine whether an omission of a claim in the bankruptcy context was inadvertent or mistaken for purposes of judicial estoppel, courts should look to the totality of the circumstances surrounding the omission.
T. M. v. University of Md. Medical System Corporation	25–197	June 18, 2026
The Rooker–Feldman doctrine bars federal district court jurisdiction over cases brought by state-court losers complaining of injuries caused by state-court judgments rendered before the district court proceedings commenced and seeking district court review and rejection of those judgments, regardless of whether the state-court judgment remains subject to further review in state appellate proceedings.
Hunter v. United States	24–1063	June 18, 2026
An appeal waiver included in a plea bargain is unenforceable when it would result in a miscarriage of justice.
United States v. Hemani	24–1234	June 18, 2026
It is an unconstitutional violation of the Second Amendment to use the federal law banning unlawful users of controlled substances from possessing firearms to criminalize the possession of a gun by anyone who habitually uses such a substance.
McCarthy v. Hernandez	25–748	June 22, 2026
No clearly established federal law requires the trial court to instruct the jury about the rule from Justice Kennedy's concurrence to Missouri v. Seibert, so federal habeas relief is not available under AEDPA.

== See also ==
- List of United States Supreme Court cases by the Roberts Court
- 2025 term opinions of the Supreme Court of the United States
