= List of United States Supreme Court cases, volume 597 =

This is a list of all the United States Supreme Court cases from volume 597 of the United States Reports:

Note: As of December 2025, final bound volumes for the U.S. Supreme Court's United States Reports have been published through volume 585 (June 2018). Newer cases from subsequent future volumes do not yet have official page numbers and typically use three underscores in place of the page number; e.g., Example v. United States, 700 U.S. ___ (2050).

Case name	Docket no.	Date decided
New York State Rifle & Pistol Association, Inc. v. Bruen	20–843	June 23, 2022
The Second and Fourteenth Amendments protect an individual's right to carry a handgun for self-defense outside the home. New York's proper-cause requirement violates the Fourteenth Amendment in that it prevents law-abiding citizens with ordinary self-defense needs from exercising their right to keep and bear arms in public for self-defense.
Vega v. Tekoh	21–499	June 23, 2022
A Miranda violation does not provide a basis for a Section 1983 claim.
Nance v. Ward	21–439	June 23, 2022
Section 1983 remains an appropriate vehicle for a prisoner's method-of-execution claim where, as here, the prisoner proposes an alternative method not authorized by the State's death-penalty statute.
Berger v. North Carolina State Conference of the NAACP	21–248	June 23, 2022
North Carolina legislative leaders are entitled to intervene in a federal constitutional challenge to the state's new voter identification law.
Dobbs v. Jackson Women's Health Organization	19–1392	June 24, 2022
The Constitution does not confer a right to abortion; Roe and Casey are overruled; and the authority to regulate abortion is returned to the people and their elected representatives. Court of Appeals for the Fifth Circuit reversed.
Becerra v. Empire Health Foundation, For Valley Hospital Medical Center	20–1312	June 24, 2022
In calculating the Medicare fraction, individuals entitled to Medicare Part A benefits are all those qualifying for the program, regardless of whether they receive Medicare payments for part or all of a hospital stay.
Ruan v. United States	20–1410	June 27, 2022
Section 841's "knowingly or intentionally" mens rea applies to the statute's "except as authorized" clause. Once a defendant meets the burden of producing evidence that his or her conduct was "authorized," the Government must prove beyond a reasonable doubt that the defendant knowingly or intentionally acted in an unauthorized manner.
Concepcion v. United States	20–1650	June 27, 2022
Section 404(b) of the First Step Act of 2018, 132 Stat. 5222, allows district courts to consider intervening changes of law or fact in exercising their discretion to reduce a sentence.
Kennedy v. Bremerton School District	21–418	June 27, 2022
The Free Exercise and Free Speech Clauses of the First Amendment protect an individual engaging in a personal religious observance from government reprisal; the Constitution neither mandates nor permits the government to suppress such religious expression.
Torres v. Texas Department of Public Safety	20–603	June 29, 2022
State sovereign immunity does not prevent states from being sued under federal law related to the nation's defense.
Oklahoma v. Castro-Huerta	21–429	June 29, 2022
The Federal Government and the State have concurrent jurisdiction to prosecute crimes committed by non-Indians against Indians in Indian country.
West Virginia v. Environmental Protection Agency	20–1530	June 30, 2022
Congress did not grant the Environmental Protection Agency in Section 111(d) of the Clean Air Act the authority to devise emissions caps based on the generation shifting approach the Agency took in the Clean Power Plan.
Biden v. Texas	21–954	June 30, 2022
The Government's rescission of the Migrant Protection Protocols did not violate section 1225 of the INA, and the October 29 Memoranda constituted final agency action.

== See also ==
- List of United States Supreme Court cases by the Roberts Court
- 2021 term opinions of the Supreme Court of the United States
