= Prison Legal News =

Monthly American magazine founded in 1990

- Editor: Paul Wright
- Categories: Prisons, law
- Frequency: Monthly
- Total circulation: 9,000 (2014)
- First issue: May 1990
- Country: United States
- Based in: Lake Worth, Florida
- Language: English
- Website: www.prisonlegalnews.org

Prison Legal News (PLN) is a monthly American magazine and online periodical published since May 1990. It primarily reports on criminal justice issues and prison and jail-related civil litigation, mainly in the United States. It is a project of the Human Rights Defense Center (HRDC), a 501(c)(3) non-profit organization.

Prison Legal News is the longest running newspaper produced by and for current and former prisoners in U.S. history.

PLN covers all aspects of the criminal justice system, including court access, prison conditions, privatization, disciplinary hearings, excessive force, mail censorship, jails, wrongful convictions, crime labs, visitation, prison phone services, immigration detention, religious freedom, free speech, prison rape, abuse of women prisoners, retaliation, the Prison Litigation Reform Act (PLRA), medical treatment, HIV and hepatitis C, prison slave labor, disenfranchisement, the death penalty and control units/supermax facilities. However, the mainstay of PLN's coverage from the beginning has been the issue of conditions of confinement.

== Origins and function ==
Prison Legal News was inspired by the need for prisoners and their families to have a voice in criminal justice policy and to provide timely, accurate news about justice-related issues and progressive reform efforts. PLN has been admired and disliked for its strong advocacy of prisoner rights, including its extensive litigation involving jails and prison systems.

As of February 2017, PLN had an average circulation of over 9,000 hardcopy issues per month. The Human Rights Defense Center estimates that about 70% of PLN's subscribers are state and federal prisoners, and PLN has incarcerated subscribers in all fifty states. Based on PLN's media pack, each subscriber's magazine is read by an average of almost 10 people, so monthly readership is around 90,000. As of February 2017, subscriptions were $30/year for prisoners, $35/year for non-incarcerated individuals and $90/year for attorneys, government agencies and corporations.

The PLN website has over 18,000 news and law articles in its database. The publication section has more than 5,600 reports, audits and other documents related to criminal justice topics, and the brief bank contains over 7,500 assorted legal pleadings - including complaints, motions, appeal briefs, verdicts, judgments and settlements in prison and jail cases. The site receives over 150,000 visitors each month and also functions as a resource for media and community outreach as well as a platform for public education on criminal justice issues. A website subscription is $149.95/year and gives full access to all of PLN's online content.

Prison Legal News also publishes and distributes legal reference and self-help educational books, ranging from their own in-house-published The Habeas Citebook: Ineffective Assistance of Counsel by Brandon Sample and the Prison Education Guide by Christopher Zoukis, to the Nolo legal how-to series, the Prisoners' Self-Help Litigation Manual, and the Federal Prison Handbook. PLN also distributes (free upon request) the Prisoner Diabetes Handbook, and is the exclusive distributor of Protecting Your Health & Safety: A Litigation Guide for Inmates, a book published by the Southern Poverty Law Center.

In addition to the monthly magazine and website, PLN has published three anthologies related to mass incarceration: The Celling of America: An Inside Look at the U.S Prison Industry (Common Courage Press, 1997); Prison Nation: The Warehousing of America's Poor (Routledge) (2003); and Prison Profiteers: Who makes Money from Mass Imprisonment (2008).

== Litigation ==
PLN has been involved in litigation concerning First Amendment and censorship issues in the prison and jail context since 1994. Co-editor Ed Mead was prevented from assisting in publishing Prison Legal News due to a condition of his parole prohibiting association with other felons – a policy specifically enacted to prevent him from further involvement with PLN.

In 1997, PLN, represented by the ACLU of Washington, joined with other publishers and prisoner plaintiffs in a suit challenging the state of Washington DOC's wide-ranging censorship of incoming mail, publications and mail classifications, among other issues. The lawsuit was settled in 2000, with the state agreeing to change its censorship policies and pay the plaintiffs' attorney fees and costs.

Prison Legal News obtained a preliminary injunction against the Nevada DOC's statewide ban on PLN, followed by a consent decree in which the DOC agreed to pay damages and change its policies concerning mail and publications. The matter was settled in September 2000.

ADX Florence, run by the federal Bureau of Prisons, enacted a policy banning all books related to prisons and prisoners. PLN filed suit in 2003 and withdrew the lawsuit in 2005 after the ADX mooted the claim by changing its unconstitutional policy.

In 2006, PLN and the California Department of Corrections and Rehabilitation (CDCR) settled the magazine's claims that CDCR mail policies violated a number of federal and state rights, under precedents established by PLN. As a result of the settlement, CDCR ordered five-year subscriptions to PLN for all of its facilities and is being monitored by PLN for compliance.

In 2012, PLN settled with the State of New York, reversing a statewide ban on the magazine in New York prisons. That year, it also settled with Berkeley County, South Carolina, reaching the largest ever jail-related censorship settlement in the United States, totaling almost $600,000 in damages and attorney fees. The U.S. Department of Justice joined PLN in its lawsuit against the unconstitutional mail policies enacted by Berkeley County.

In 2015, PLN settled a case with the U.S. Department of Homeland Security after PLN filed a FOIA request for records related to telephone services and other documents concerning the ability of immigration prisoners to communicate with people outside the Northwest Detention Center in Tacoma, Washington; this is operated by the GEO Corporation, a private for-profit company.

In addition to battling unconstitutional censorship through litigation (see the May 2010 issue of PLN for a full listing of cases), Prison Legal News has also filed numerous lawsuits related to public records and Freedom of Information Act requests in order to pursue its investigative reporting on detention facility issues.

These cases have led to landmark rulings. including PLN v. Washington Department of Corrections, 115 P.3d 316 (Wash. 2005). At the time it was the largest penalty and attorney fee payout in a Washington state public records case in history and disclosed serious misconduct among Washington prison doctors.

PLN v. Lappin held that PLN was entitled to fee waivers in Freedom of Information Act requests where the information sought would educate the public about government operations. PLN v. Lappin, 436 F. Supp.2d 17 (D DC 2006). Additional cases include: PLN v. The GEO Group, Inc., Circuit Court of the 15th Judicial Circuit of Florida, Case No. 50 2005 CA 011195 AA; Friedmann v. CCA, Chancery Court for Davidson County (TN), Case No. 01-1105-I; and PLN v. EOUSA, USDC (D. Col.), Case No. 1:08-cv-01055-MSK.

== Developments and advocacy ==
Founded as Prisoners Legal News, in 2009 PLN's parent organization was renamed as the Human Rights Defense Center. It is a non-profit organization dedicated to protecting the human rights of people held in U.S. detention facilities. HRDC also supports Prison Legal News in national campaigns in coordination with other advocacy groups to lower prison phone rates and demand transparency and accountability of private prison contractors, and is involved with numerous other activities related to the human rights of prisoners.

PLN's managing editor is a former prisoner. The magazine features contributions from nationally recognized scholars and activists involved in criminal justice reform or advocacy efforts. Contributors include Mumia Abu-Jamal, Noam Chomsky, Marie Gottschalk, Prison Policy Initiative Director Peter Wagner, Prison Law Office Director Donald Specter, ACLU National Prison Project Director David Fathi, and Christopher Zoukis, founder of PrisonEducation.com and PrisonerResource.com. The bulk of PLN's content is written by current and former prisoners. As of 2017, Prison Legal News has published continuously for 27 years.
