= Fernandez v. United States =

- Supreme Court of the United States

Decided May 28, 2026
- Full case name: Fernandez v. United States
- Docket no.: 24-556
- Citations: 608 U.S. ___ (more)

Case history
- Prior: 569 F.Supp.3d 169 (S.D. N.Y. 2021)

Holding
- An incarcerated person who collaterally attacks the validity of his conviction must proceed through 28 U.S.C. §2255, not 18 U.S.C. §3582; the supposed invalidity of a conviction is not among the "extraordinary and compelling reasons" that justify compassionate release.

Court membership
- Chief Justice John Roberts Associate Justices Clarence Thomas · Samuel Alito; Sonia Sotomayor · Elena Kagan; Neil Gorsuch · Brett Kavanaugh; Amy Coney Barrett · Ketanji Brown Jackson

Case opinions
- Majority: Barrett, joined by Roberts, Thomas, Alito, Gorsuch, Kavanaugh
- Concurrence: Sotomayor (in judgment), joined by Kagan
- Dissent: Jackson

Fernandez v. United States, 608 U.S. ___ (2026), was a United States Supreme Court case in which the court held that an incarcerated person who collaterally attacks the validity of his conviction must proceed through 28 U.S.C. §2255, not 18 U.S.C. §3582; the supposed invalidity of a conviction is not among the "extraordinary and compelling reasons" that justify compassionate release.

== Background ==
Joe Fernandez was indicted in 2013 for his role in the assassination of two gang members. The prosecution's theory was that members of a drug ring had paid Fernandez to act as the backup shooter, and when the primary shooter's gun jammed, Fernandez fired 14 rounds and killed both victims. Fernandez's alleged co-conspirator, Patrick Darge, testified against Fernandez at trial. The jury convicted Fernandez of murder for hire and a firearms offense, and the federal District Court imposed two consecutive life sentences.

Fernandez pursued multiple avenues of relief. He first asked the District Court to reconsider, alleging Brady violations related to the government's failure to disclose that another alleged co-conspirator, Luis Rivera, had denied driving the getaway car. The District Court reviewed the Government's notes from interviewing Rivera and concluded that they did not contain relevant information, though the judge noted he was "troubled" by the Government's lenient treatment of Rivera. The Second Circuit Court of Appeals affirmed the conviction and sentence, rejecting both the Brady claim and Fernandez's insufficiency-of-evidence argument. It held that a reasonable jury could credit Darge's testimony and that the evidence was sufficient to support conviction. Fernandez then twice moved for post-conviction relief under 28 U.S.C. §2255. The first motion, arguing actual innocence based on witness credibility, was described by the Second Circuit as "plainly meritless." The second succeeded only in vacating his firearms conviction based on United States v. Davis, thus leaving in place Fernandez's murder-for-hire conviction. In the order vacating the firearms conviction, the District Judge speculated that the government had offered Rivera a lenient plea deal because it "kn[ew] something" inconsistent with Darge's testimony, and pointedly noted that if Fernandez's life sentence on the murder-for-hire charge "were to be commuted, or held unlawful, [Fernandez] would be released immediately."

Fernandez finally filed a motion for compassionate release under 18 U.S.C. §3582(c)(1)(A)(i), arguing that extraordinary and compelling reasons—above all, that he was innocent—warranted a sentencing reduction. The District Court granted the motion, citing unease about whether Darge's testimony had been truthful, concerns about the government's charging decisions, and doubts about the correctness of the jury's verdict. The Second Circuit reversed, holding that challenges to the validity of a conviction are not cognizable as "extraordinary and compelling reasons" under §3582(c)(1)(A). At the time, seven circuits agreed with the Second Circuit on that legal issue, while two circuits took the other side.

The Supreme Court granted certiorari.

== Opinion of the court ==
The Supreme Court issued an opinion on May 28, 2026.

=== Jackson's dissent ===
Justice Jackson dissented, saying "The majority's atextual and unsupported limitation on a district court’s sentencing discretion is an unnecessary rewriting of the statute Congress wrote and an unwarranted revision of the compassionate-release scheme Congress intended to establish."

=== Sotomayor's concurrence ===
Justice Sotomayor concurred with the majority's result in an opinion joined by Justice Kagan. Sotomayor began by endorsing Jackson's dissent, saying "[the majority's approach] superimposes a technical, and likely unworkable, habeas analysis on top of a sentence-reduction framework that broadly calls for holistic review." However, Sotomayor believed the lower court needed to be affirmed on "a different, far simpler ground": "A motion for compassionate release cannot justify a reduced sentence if it relies solely on facts a court already considered in imposing the initial sentence, rather than any changed circumstances that developed after sentencing."
