= 2025 term opinions of the Supreme Court of the United States =

October 2025 to October 2026 opinions

The 2025 term of the Supreme Court of the United States began on October 6, 2025, and concluded on October 4, 2026. The table below illustrates which opinion was filed by each justice in each case and which justices joined each opinion.

== Table key ==
- Delivered the court's opinion
- Joined the court's opinion
- Filed a concurrence
- Joined a concurrence
- Filed a dissent
- Joined a dissent
- Filed a concurrence/dissent
- Joined a concurrence/dissent
- Filed a statement
- Joined a statement
- Did not participate in the decision
- Decisions that do not note an argument date were decided without oral argument. Decisions that do not note a justice delivering the court's opinion are per curiam.
- Multiple concurrences and dissents within a case are numbered, with joining votes numbered accordingly. Justices frequently join multiple opinions in a single case; each vote is subdivided accordingly.
- An asterisk ( * ) in the court's opinion denotes that it was only a majority in part or a plurality. An asterisk in a joining vote denotes that the justice joined it only in part.
- A dash ( - ) denotes that the justice voted without filing or joining an opinion.

== 2025 term opinions ==
#	Case name and citation	Argued	Decided	Roberts	Thomas	Alito	Sotomayor	Kagan	Gorsuch	Kavanaugh	Barrett	Jackson
1	Pitts v. Mississippi, 607 U.S. 1		November 24, 2025									
2	Clark v. Sweeney, 607 U.S. 7		November 24, 2025									
3	Doe v. Dynamic Physical Therapy, LLC, 607 U.S. 11		December 8, 2025									
4	Bowe v. United States, 607 U.S. 13	October 14, 2025	January 9, 2026								*	
5	Bost v. Illinois State Board of Elections, 607 U.S. 71	October 8, 2025	January 14, 2026									
6	Case v. Montana, 607 U.S. 107	October 15, 2025	January 14, 2026				1		2			
7	Barrett v. United States, 607 U.S. 128	October 7, 2025	January 14, 2026		*	*			*	*	*	
8	Coney Island Auto Parts Unlimited, Inc. v. Burton, 607 U.S. 155	November 4, 2025	January 20, 2026									
9	Ellingburg v. United States, 607 U.S. 163	October 14, 2025	January 20, 2026									
10	Berk v. Choy, 607 U.S. 187	October 6, 2025	January 20, 2026									
11	Klein v. Martin, 607 U.S. 213		January 26, 2026									-
12	Learning Resources, Inc. v. Trump, 607 U.S. 229	November 5, 2025	February 20, 2026		1 2	2	* 3	* 3	1	2	2	* 3 4
13	Postal Service v. Konan, 607 U.S. 391	October 8, 2025	February 24, 2026									
14	Hain Celestial Group, Inc. v. Palmquist, 607 U.S. 421	November 4, 2025	February 24, 2026									
15	GEO Group, Inc. v. Menocal, 607 U.S. 438	November 10, 2025	February 25, 2026		* 1	2						
16	Villarreal v. Texas, 607 U.S. 465	October 6, 2025	February 25, 2026		2	1			2			
17	Mirabelli v. Bonta, 607 U.S. 492		March 2, 2026				-					
18	Galette v. New Jersey Transit Corp., 607 U.S. 509	January 14, 2026	March 4, 2026									
19	Urias-Orellana v. Bondi, 607 U.S. 537	December 1, 2025	March 4, 2026									
20	Olivier v. City of Brandon, 607 U.S. 552	December 3, 2025	March 20, 2026									
21	Zorn v. Linton, 607 U.S. 568		March 23, 2026									
22	Cox Communications, Inc. v. Sony Music Entertainment, 607 U.S. 583	December 1, 2025	March 25, 2026									
23	Rico v. United States, 607 U.S. 609	November 3, 2025	March 25, 2026									
24	Chiles v. Salazar, 607 U.S. 627	October 7, 2025	March 31, 2026									
25	Chevron USA Inc. v. Plaquemines Parish, 608 U.S. 1	January 12, 2026	April 17, 2026									
26	District of Columbia v. R.W., 608 U.S. 22		April 20, 2026				-					
27	Hencely v. Fluor Corp., 608 U.S. 31	November 3, 2025	April 22, 2026									
28	Enbridge Energy, LP v. Nessel, 608 U.S. 67	February 24, 2026	April 22, 2026									
29	Louisiana v. Callais, 608 U.S. 85	October 15, 2025	April 29, 2026									
30	First Choice Women's Resource Centers, Inc. v. Davenport, 608 U.S. 174	December 2, 2025	April 29, 2026									
31	Jules v. Andre Balazs Properties, 608 U.S. 200	March 30, 2026	May 14, 2026									
32	Montgomery v. Caribe Transport II, LLC, 608 U.S. 219	March 4, 2026	May 14, 2026									
33	Havana Docks Corp. v. Royal Caribbean Cruises, Ltd., 608 U.S. 235	February 23, 2026	May 21, 2026									
34	M & K Employee Solutions, LLC v. Trustees of the IAM National Pension Fund, 608 U.S. 264	January 20, 2026	May 21, 2026									
35	Hamm v. Smith, 608 U.S. 278	December 10, 2025	May 21, 2026	2*	1 2	2			2*			
36	Margolin v. NAIJ, 608 U.S. 339		May 26, 2026									
37	Flowers Foods, Inc. v. Brock, 608 U.S. 380	March 25, 2026	May 28, 2026									
38	Pitchford v. Cain, 608 U.S. 391	March 31, 2026	May 28, 2026									
39	Fernandez v. United States, 608 U.S. 411	November 12, 2025	May 28, 2026									
40	Rutherford v. United States, 608 U.S. 454	November 12, 2025	May 28, 2026									
41	Whitton v. Dixon, 608 U.S. 493		June 1, 2026			*						
42	Allen v. Milligan, 608 U.S. 511		June 2, 2026									
43	FCC v. AT&T Inc., 608 U.S. 531	April 21, 2026	June 4, 2026									
44	Sripetch v. SEC, 608 U.S. 555	April 20, 2026	June 4, 2026									
45	Hikma Pharmaceuticals USA Inc. v. Amarin Pharma, Inc., 608 U.S. 580	April 29, 2026	June 4, 2026									
46	Abouammo v. United States, 608 U.S. 597	March 30, 2026	June 11, 2026									
47	FS Credit Opportunities Corp. v. Saba Capital Master Fund, Ltd., 608 U.S. 608	December 10, 2025	June 11, 2026				2	1 2*				2
48	Keathley v. Buddy Ayers Construction, Inc., 608 U.S. 647	March 24, 2026	June 11, 2026		1		2		1			
49	T. M. v. University of Md. Medical System Corporation, 608 U.S. 668	April 20, 2026	June 18, 2026									
50	Hunter v. United States, 608 U.S. 713	March 3, 2026	June 18, 2026			2	1		1	2	2 3	1
51	United States v. Hemani, 608 U.S. 772	March 2, 2026	June 18, 2026		1	3	2	3				2
52	McCarthy v. Hernandez, 608 U.S. 809		June 22, 2026				-	-				-
53	Blanche v. Lau, 609 U.S. 1	April 22, 2026	June 23, 2026									
54	Pung v. Isabella County, 609 U.S. 30	February 25, 2026	June 23, 2026		* 2		1		1 2*			1
55	Landor v. Louisiana Department of Corrections and Public Safety, 609 U.S. 59	November 10, 2025	June 23, 2026									
56	Exxon Mobil Corp. v. Corporación Cimex, S. A. (Cuba), 609 U.S. 108	February 23, 2026	June 23, 2026									
57	Cisco Systems, Inc. v. Doe, 609 U.S. 141	April 28, 2026	June 23, 2026					*				*
58	Wolford v. Lopez, 609 U.S. 185	January 20, 2026	June 25, 2026		*		2	1	*			2
59	Mullin v. Al Otro Lado, 609 U.S. 258	March 24, 2026	June 25, 2026				1	1				1 2
60	Mullin v. Doe, 609 U.S. 324	April 29, 2026	June 25, 2026						*		*	
61	Monsanto v. Durnell, 609 U.S. 371	April 27, 2026	June 25, 2026									
62	Trump v. Slaughter, 609 U.S. 422	December 8, 2025	June 29, 2026		*							
63	Trump v. Cook, 609 U.S. 528	January 21, 2026	June 29, 2026		1	2			2	1	3	2
64	Chatrie v. United States, 609 U.S. 605	April 27, 2026	June 29, 2026		1*	1	1		2		2 1*	1
65	Watson v. Republican National Committee, 609 U.S. 672	March 23, 2026	June 29, 2026							*		
66	Trump v. Barbara, 609 U.S. ___	April 1, 2026	June 30, 2026		1	2	*		1 3			
67	National Republican Senatorial Committee v. FEC, 609 U.S. ___	December 9, 2025	June 30, 2026									
68	West Virginia v. B. P. J., 609 U.S. ___	January 13, 2026	June 30, 2026		1		1	1	2			1 2
69	Trump v. California, 609 U.S. ___		August 24, 2026				1	1				2
70	National Park Service v. National Trust for Historic Preservation in the United States, 609 U.S. ___		August 31, 2026									
71	National Republican Congressional Committee v. Brown, 609 U.S. ___		September 4, 2026									
72	Department of Homeland Security v. League of Women Voters, 609 U.S. ___		September 25, 2026									
73	People Not Politicians v. Onder, 609 U.S. ___		September 25, 2026									
#	Case name and citation	Argued	Decided	Roberts	Thomas	Alito	Sotomayor	Kagan	Gorsuch	Kavanaugh	Barrett	Jackson

== 2025 term membership and statistics ==
This is the twenty-first term of Chief Justice Roberts's tenure and the fourth term with the current membership.

Justice		Appointment history		Agreement with judgment		Opinions filed				
Seniority	Name	President	Date confirmed	%	#					Total
Chief Justice	John Roberts	George W. Bush	September 29, 2005	94.5%	69/73	6	0	0	1	7
Associate Justice	Clarence Thomas	George H. W. Bush	October 15, 1991	84.9%	62/73	6	15	0	7	28
Associate Justice	Samuel Alito	George W. Bush	January 31, 2006	81.9%	59/72	6	3	0	7	16
Associate Justice	Sonia Sotomayor	Barack Obama	August 6, 2009	68.5%	50/73	6	7	1	7	21
Associate Justice	Elena Kagan	Barack Obama	August 7, 2010	68.5%	50/73	6	3	0	9	18
Associate Justice	Neil Gorsuch	Donald Trump	April 7, 2017	87.7%	64/73	7	7	0	3	17
Associate Justice	Brett Kavanaugh	Donald Trump	October 6, 2018	94.5%	69/73	6	3	1	1	11
Associate Justice	Amy Coney Barrett	Donald Trump	October 26, 2020	93.2%	68/73	7	5	0	3	15
Associate Justice	Ketanji Brown Jackson	Joe Biden	April 7, 2022	61.6%	45/73	6	8	2	13	29
Notes on statistics: Opinion counts only include the bench opinions listed above; opinions relating to orders or in-chambers opinions are not included.; Agreement with the Court's judgment does not guarantee agreement with the reasoning expressed in its opinion. A justice is not considered in agreement if they dissented even in part. Agreement percentages are based only on the listed cases in which a justice participated and are rounded to the nearest one-tenth of one percentage point.; Individual opinion counts may not match the Supreme Court's totals due to cases where justices jointly author opinions, which is counted separately here, but only once in the Supreme Court's records.						Totals				
						56	51	4	51	162
