= 2026 term per curiam opinions of the Supreme Court of the United States =

The Supreme Court of the United States has so far handed down two per curiam opinions during its 2026 term. This term began on October 5, 2026, and will end on October 3, 2027.

Because per curiam decisions are issued from the Court as an institution, these opinions all lack the attribution of authorship or joining votes to specific justices. All justices on the Court at the time the decision was handed down are assumed to have participated and concurred unless otherwise noted.

== Court membership ==
Chief Justice: John Roberts

Associate Justices: Clarence Thomas, Samuel Alito, Sonia Sotomayor, Elena Kagan, Neil Gorsuch, Brett Kavanaugh, Amy Coney Barrett, Ketanji Brown Jackson

== FCC v. Brown ==
- Full caption: Federal Communications Commission, Applicant v. Sherrod Brown, et al.
- Citations: 610 U.S. ___ (2026)
- Prior history: Petition for review granted. Brown v. FCC, No. 26-1785 (4th Cir. 2026).; Stayed. National Republican Congressional Committee v. Brown, 609 U.S. 1082 (2026).; Writ of mandamus issued. In re Brown, No. 26-2230 (4th Cir. 2026).
- Full text of the opinion: Official slip opinion · Justia

610 U.S. ___ (2026)
Decided October 14, 2025.
Under 47 U.S.C. § 315(b)(1)(A), television broadcasters must offer favorable rates to political advertisers in the weeks leading up to an election. By law, such rates may not exceed the "lowest unit charge" the station charges its commercial advertisers for the same class of airtime, spot length, and period. On March 30, 2026, the Federal Communications Commission issued a public notice stating that political candidates, joint fundraising committees with non-candidate members, and political parties engaged in coordinated political activity are entitled to the LUC.

Four congressional candidates filed an application with the FCC, asking it to set aside the public notice as unlawful. While that application was pending, the candidates filed a petition for review of the public notice in the United States Court of Appeals for the Fourth Circuit, asking the Court to also set aside the public notice as unlawful. The Fourth Circuit panel held that it had jurisdiction over the candidates' petition, granted the petition, and vacated the FCC's public notice. On September 4, 2026, the Supreme Court stayed the Fourth Circuit's mandate, holding that the Court of Appeals likely lacked jurisdiction to hear the candidates' petition for review while their application to the FCC for the same relief was still pending.

On October 7, 2026, the same Fourth Circuit panel issued a writ of mandamus to the FCC, ordering it to resolve the candidates' application by October 9, so that it could proceed to adjudicate the candidates' petition for review. The FCC filed an application with the Supreme Court seeking a stay of the mandamus order.

The Supreme Court granted the FCC's application for a stay, finding that the Fourth Circuit's issuance of a writ of mandamus was inappropriate under the circumstances.

Justices Sotomayor and Jackson would have denied the application.
