= List of United States Supreme Court cases, volume 607 =

This is a list of all the United States Supreme Court cases from volume 607 of the United States Reports:

Note: As of December 2025, final bound volumes for the U.S. Supreme Court's United States Reports have been published through volume 585 (June 2018). Newer cases from subsequent future volumes do not yet have official page numbers and typically use three underscores in place of the page number; e.g., Example v. United States, 700 U.S. ___ (2050).

Case name	Docket no.	Date decided
Pitts v. Mississippi	24–1159	November 24, 2025
The Confrontation Clause of the Sixth Amendment requires an individualized finding that a screen is necessary to protect a child from trauma before it can be placed between the child and the defendant during testimony in a criminal trial.
Clark v. Sweeney	25–52	November 24, 2025
Reversing a conviction on appeal based on a claim of constitutional error that the petitioner had never alleged violated the party presentation principle.
Doe v. Dynamic Physical Therapy, LLC	25–180	December 8, 2025
States have no power to create immunity for federal causes of action.
Bowe v. United States	24–5438	January 9, 2026
Under AEDPA, people in federal custody may (1) petition the Supreme Court for review when a court of appeal denies them authorization to file a successive habeas petititon, and (2) reraise arguments that were dismissed during their first habeas petition in the successive petition.
Bost v. Illinois State Board of Elections	24–568	January 14, 2026
A candidate for federal office has standing to challenge time, place, and manner regulations created by a state that affect the candidate's federal election.
Case v. Montana	24–624	January 14, 2026
An officer may enter a home without a warrant if they have an objectively reasonable basis for believing that an occupant is seriously injured or imminently threatened with such injury.
Barrett v. United States	24–5774	January 14, 2026
Two separate convictions under both 18 U.S.C. § 924(c)(1)(a)(i) and § 924(j) for a single act are not permitted because Congress did not intend that result.
Coney Island Auto Parts Unlimited, Inc. v. Burton	24–808	January 20, 2026
Federal Rule of Civil Procedure 60(c)(1)'s requirement that parties make Rule 60(b) motions within a "reasonable time" applies to a motion seeking relief from an allegedly void judgment under Rule 60(b)(4).
Ellingburg v. United States	24–482	January 20, 2026
Restitution under the Mandatory Victims Restitution Act of 1996 is criminal punishment for purposes of the Ex Post Facto Clause.
Berk v. Choy	24–440	January 20, 2026
A state law requiring an affidavit of merit to be filed with a complaint is unenforceable in federal court because it conflicts with Rule 8 of the Federal Rules of Civil Procedure.
Klein v. Martin	25–51	January 26, 2026
The state court applied the proper Brady test, and the Fourth Circuit did not sufficiently defer to the state court under AEDPA because there was enough other evidence suggesting that the defendant would have been convicted regardless of the claimed Brady material.
Learning Resources, Inc. v. Trump	24–1287	February 20, 2026
IEEPA does not authorize the President to impose tariffs.
Postal Service v. Konan	24–351	February 24, 2026
The United States Postal Service cannot be sued for failure to deliver the mail even when postal employees intentionally and maliciously refuse to deliver the mail.
Hain Celestial Group, Inc. v. Palmquist	24–724	February 24, 2026
The erroneous dismissal of a non-diverse party after a case has been removed to federal court does not permit the federal court to exercise diversity jurisdiction over the case; such a case must be returned to state court.
GEO Group, Inc. v. Menocal	24–758	February 25, 2026
An order denying a government contractor's claim of derivative sovereign immunity cannot be immediately appealed.
Villarreal v. Texas	24–557	February 25, 2026
Prohibiting discussion of a defendant's testimony during a mid-testimony overnight recess does not violate the Sixth Amendment.
Mirabelli v. Bonta	25A810	March 2, 2026
Stay granted for the parents and denied for other plaintiffs. It is likely that California cannot require a child's consent before a school may tell a parent about that child's gender transitioning at school or require that schools use children's preferred names and pronouns regardless of their parents' wishes.
Galette v. New Jersey Transit Corp.	24–1021	March 4, 2026
NJ Transit is not an arm of New Jersey and thus is not entitled to share in New Jersey's interstate sovereign immunity.
Urias-Orellana v. Bondi	24–777	March 4, 2026
When reviewing an immigration court's decision to deny asylum, a reviewing court must apply a substantial-evidence standard. Under that standard, to reverse an immigration court that has found that an asylum applicant was not fleeing persecution, the reviewing court must find that the applicant proved that they were persecuted with evidence that is so compelling that no reasonable factfinder could fail to find the requisite fear of persecution.
Olivier v. City of Brandon	24–993	March 20, 2026
A plaintiff can sue the government under Section 1983 to seek wholly prospective relief from a law that they believe is unconstitutional even though they cannot use Section 1983 to challenge a prior conviction.
Zorn v. Linton	25–297	March 23, 2026
Because the Second Circuit failed to identify a case where an officer taking similar actions in similar circumstances was held to have violated the Constitution, Zorn was entitled to qualified immunity.
Cox Communications, Inc. v. Sony Music Entertainment	24–171	March 25, 2026
The provider of a service is contributorily liable for a user's infringement only if it intended that the provided service be used for infringement, which can be shown only if the party induced the infringement or the provided service is tailored to that infringement.
Rico v. United States	24–1056	March 25, 2026
The Sentencing Reform Act does not authorize a rule automatically extending a defendant's term of supervised release when the defendant fails to report to probation.
Chiles v. Salazar	24–539	March 31, 2026
The First Amendment to the United States Constitution requires strict scrutiny review of a state's policy of using its licensing power to restrict topics that therapists may discuss with clients.

== See also ==
- List of United States Supreme Court cases by the Roberts Court
- 2025 term opinions of the Supreme Court of the United States
