= Dana Leigh Marks =

American lawyer and retired immigration judge

Dana Leigh Marks is an American lawyer and retired immigration judge. She served as president of the National Association of Immigration Judges for fourteen years. Since her retirement, she has vocally advocated for reforms for the immigration court system, including moving these courts out of the executive branch to make them more independent.

In 1986, she argued the United States Supreme Court case Immigration and Naturalization Service v. Cardoza-Fonseca, ultimately persuading the Court to rule in her clients' favor. This case made it easier to apply and qualify for asylum in the United States. Shortly thereafter, in January 1987, she became an immigration judge in San Francisco, and remained one until her retirement on December 31, 2021. She is noted for her witty descriptions of the reality of immigration courts in the United States. For example, her remark that "Immigration judges do death penalty cases in a traffic court setting" has been widely referenced.
