= Barrett v. United States =

Barrett v. United States could refer to:

- Barrett v. United States, 169 U.S. 218 (1898)
- Barrett v. United States, 607 U.S. ___ (2026)
- Barrett v. United States, 423 U.S. 212 (1976)
