= 2025 term per curiam opinions of the Supreme Court of the United States =

The Supreme Court of the United States handed down sixteen per curiam opinions during its 2025 term. This term began on October 6, 2025, and ended on October 4, 2026.

Because per curiam decisions are issued from the Court as an institution, these opinions all lack the attribution of authorship or joining votes to specific justices. All justices on the Court at the time the decision was handed down are assumed to have participated and concurred unless otherwise noted.

== Court membership ==
Chief Justice: John Roberts

Associate Justices: Clarence Thomas, Samuel Alito, Sonia Sotomayor, Elena Kagan, Neil Gorsuch, Brett Kavanaugh, Amy Coney Barrett, Ketanji Brown Jackson

== Pitts v. Mississippi ==
- Full caption: Jeffrey Clyde Pitts v. Mississippi
- Citations: 607 U.S. 1 (2025)
- Prior history: Pitts v. State, 405 So. 3d 1238 (Miss. 2025)
- Laws applied: Confrontation Clause of the Sixth Amendment to the United States Constitution
- Full text of the opinion: official slip opinion · Justia

607 U.S. 1 (2025)
Decided November 24, 2025.
The Supreme Court summarily reversed (i.e., without briefing or oral argument beyond the petition for certiorari) the Mississippi Supreme Court because the Confrontation Clause of the Sixth Amendment requires an individualized finding that a screen is necessary to protect a child from trauma before it can be placed between the child and the defendant during testimony in a criminal trial.

In May 2020, petitioner Jeffrey Pitts's four-year-old daughter, pseudonymously referred to as A.G.C., told her mother that Pitts had sexually abused her. The state of Mississippi subsequently prosecuted Pitts for child sexual abuse. A.G.C. was to testify during Pitts's trial. A Mississippi statute states that a child who testifies in a criminal case always has the right to a screen that obscures the child's view of the defendant. Mississippi moved for A.G.C. to be provided this screen, but Pitts objected on the basis that the screen violated the Confrontation Clause. The trial court denied the objection. Pitts was convicted in February 2021. The Mississippi Court of Appeals and ultimately the Mississippi Supreme Court rejected Pitts's arguments for a new trial, prompting his appeal to the U.S. Supreme Court. Pitts was represented by Stuart Banner, a professor at the UCLA School of Law.

Under the Supreme Court precedents of Coy v. Iowa and Maryland v. Craig, placing a screen between a defendant and witness may only occur if there is a case-specific finding that the screen is necessary. Because the Mississippi trial court never made such a finding, Pitts's Confrontation Clause rights had been violated. The Supreme Court remanded the case to the Mississippi Supreme Court to determine if the violation warranted a new trial.

== Clark v. Sweeney ==
- Full caption: Terence Clark v. Jeremiah Antoine Sweeney
- Citations: 607 U.S. 7 (2025)
- Prior history: Sweeney v. Graham, 2025 WL 800452 (4th Cir. 2025)
- Laws applied: Principle of party presentation
- Full text of the opinion: official slip opinion · Justia · SCOTUSblog

607 U.S. 7 (2025)
Decided November 24, 2025.
The Supreme Court summarily reversed the Fourth Circuit's erroneous grant of habeas corpus relief to the respondent based on a claim of constitutional error that he had never alleged.

Jeremiah Sweeney was convicted of second-degree murder and multiple related crimes in Maryland state court. At trial, a juror unlawfully visited the crime scene on his own initiative. That juror reported the findings to the jury, who reported his visit to the court. After Sweeney's defense and the prosecution conferred, they agreed that the judge should not call a mistrial, but instead remove the delinquent juror and allow deliberations to go ahead with one less juror. The jury convicted Sweeney.

Sweeney later sought post-conviction relief in state court, alleging ineffective assistance of counsel. He claimed that his trial counsel should have sought to voir dire the entire jury to ensure that the delinquent juror's misconduct did not influence the other jurors. The state court denied relief. Sweeney then sought habeas relief in federal district court, alleging that the state court had unreasonably applied the Supreme Court precedent of Strickland v. Washington, which defines ineffective assistance of counsel. The federal district court denied relief.

The Fourth Circuit Court of Appeals reversed the district court, stating that a "combination of extraordinary failures from juror to judge to attorney" deprived Sweeney of many of his fair trial rights, permitting habeas relief. The Supreme Court reversed the Fourth Circuit on appeal because Sweeney had only raised the voir dire issue as a reason for relief; under the principle of party presentation, the Fourth Circuit thus should not have granted relief based on the "combination of extraordinary failures," which Sweeney never invoked and the government had no opportunity to respond to.

== Doe v. Dynamic Physical Therapy, LLC ==
- Full caption: John Doe v. Dynamic Physical Therapy, LLC
- Citations: 607 U.S. 11 (2025)
- Prior history: Trial court judgment affirmed, 404 So. 3d 1008 (La. Ct. App., 1st Cir. 2024), writ denied, 407 So. 3d 623 (La. 2025)
- Laws applied: Supremacy Clause of Article Six of the United States Constitution
- Full text of the opinion: official slip opinion · Justia

607 U.S. 11 (2025)
Decided December 8, 2025.
The Supreme Court summarily reversed the Louisiana Court of Appeal's decision holding that a Louisiana state law barred federal claims against health care providers, because states have no power to create immunity for federal causes of action.

The plaintiff (known only as John Doe) was a patient at a physical therapy clinic during the COVID-19 pandemic. He wanted to use the clinic's pool, but the clinic barred him from doing so because he had HIV. In 2021, Doe sued the clinic for disability discrimination under the federal Americans with Disabilities Act. However, he brought the action in Louisiana state court. The state court threw out the case because a Louisiana state statute grants healthcare providers immunity from civil lawsuits during public health emergencies; the clinic was a healthcare provider, and the COVID-19 pandemic was a public health emergency. The Louisiana Court of Appeal affirmed and the Louisiana Supreme Court denied further review, prompting Doe to appeal to the Supreme Court.

The Supreme Court reversed the Louisiana Court of Appeal's decision because, per the Supremacy Clause, states do not have power to confer immunity from federal causes of action. The Louisiana state statute thus could not be used to bar Doe's lawsuit, which arose under federal law.

== Klein v. Martin ==
- Full caption: Christopher Klein, Superintendent, Department of Detention Facilities for Anne Arundel County, et al., Petitioners v. Charles Brandon Martin
- Citations: 607 U.S. 213 (2026)
- Prior history: Martin v. Nines, 2025 WL 215521 (4th Cir. 2025)
- Subsequent history: Martin v. Klein, 2026 WL 583290 (4th Cir. 2025)
- Laws applied: Antiterrorism and Effective Death Penalty Act of 1996
- Full text of the opinion: official slip opinion · Justia

607 U.S. 213 (2026)
Decided January 26, 2026.
The Supreme Court summarily reversed the Fourth Circuit's affirmation of habeas relief for the respondent because it failed to apply the proper, deferential standard.

Charles Martin was convicted of murdering his girlfriend Jodi Torok's unborn child in Maryland state court. Torok had been shot in the head with a pistol by an unknown assailant, and while Torok survived, the fetus did not. Among the evidence gathered from the crime scene was a Gatorade bottle modified for use as a suppressor. DNA evidence gathered from the bottle strongly pointed to Martin, though forensic experts could not rule out others. Testimony from a variety of people associated with Martin also implicated him in the murder in a variety of ways, including that he had been searching for suppressors on the internet using his laptop. The jury ultimately convicted Martin of murder as an accessory.

Martin sought post-conviction relief in state court, alleging that prosecutors had failed to disclose exculpatory evidence, in violation of Martin's rights under Brady v. Maryland. Martin claimed that the exculpatory evidence in question was a forensic report of his computers, which would have revealed that his laptop had not been used since 2005 and that it had not been used to search for suppressors or Gatorade. While the lower court agreed, the Maryland Court of Special Appeals reversed and denied Martin relief on the basis that the forensic report was not material to the case; the other evidence against Martin was too strong.

Martin then sought habeas relief in federal district court, alleging that the Maryland courts had unreasonably applied Brady. The district court granted relief on the basis of the forensic report, and the Fourth Circuit affirmed, claiming that the Maryland appellate court's opinion had failed to discuss certain evidence and was not nuanced. The Supreme Court reversed because the standard for habeas relief focuses on whether the court misapplied precedent, not whether the opinion was of good quality, and because a fairminded jurist could have upheld Martin's conviction, even accounting for the forensic report.

Justice Jackson dissented from the grant of certiorari without comment.

== Mirabelli v. Bonta ==
- Full caption: Elizabeth Mirabelli, et al. v. Rob Bonta, Attorney General of California, et al.
- Citations: 607 U.S. 492 (2026)
- Prior history: Stay granted, 2026 WL 44874 (9th Cir. 2026)
- Laws applied: Free Exercise Clause of the First Amendment to the United States Constitution, Due Process Clause of the Fourteenth Amendment to the United States Constitution
- Full text of the opinion: official slip opinion · Justia

607 U.S. 492 (2026)
Decided March 2, 2026.
The Supreme Court partially granted an application to vacate the Court of Appeals for the Ninth Circuit's stay of an injunction against California state officials from enforcing the state's policies regarding student gender identity.

The case began as a challenge to California education laws that prevented school districts from disclosing students' gender transitions at school unless the student consented. A class of parents and teachers sued various California state officials in a federal district court, alleging that the laws violated their rights under the Free Exercise Clause of the First Amendment, which protects religious liberty, and Due Process Clause of the Fourteenth Amendment, which protects unenumerated rights under the theory of substantive due process. The district court entered an injunction requiring the defendants to disclose students' gender transitions and to follow parents' instructions regarding their children's gender presentations. The Ninth Circuit stayed the injunction, stating that it was overly broad and was not supported on the merits. The plaintiffs applied to the Supreme Court to vacate the stay.

The Supreme Court vacated the stay with respect to the parents because it was not justified under the traditional multi-factor test used for stays, as described in Nken v. Holder:

- Likelihood of success on the merits: The parents were likely to succeed because California's policies interfered with parents' rights to "guide the religious development of their children," a right identified in Mahmoud v. Taylor. Because the parents' objections to the California policies rested on their religious beliefs regarding gender, the policy triggered strict scrutiny, where only those policies justified by a "compelling interest" may survive First Amendment review. California's policies were not justified under this standard; Supreme Court precedent identifies parents as the main protectors of children's interests, meaning that a blanket application of the policy without a parental exception likely violated the Free Exercise Clause. The parents who challenged the law on substantive due process grounds only also had a right to control "the upbringing and education of [their] children" according to Pierce v. Society of Sisters, which encompassed a right to participate in decisions regarding mental health and gender dysphoria.
- Irreparable harm: The parents demonstrated irreparable harm because they alleged a constitutional injury.
- Balance of equities: The balance of equities disfavored the stay because the central point of the stay was to protect the safety of children, but the injunction better promoted that safety versus the stay.

The Supreme Court also determined that the procedural issues the Ninth Circuit identified were unlikely to prevail; the injunction was not overbroad.

Justices Thomas and Alito stated without further comment that they grant the application in full (i.e. vacate the stay with regard to both the parents and teachers). Justice Sotomayor stated without further comment that she would deny the application in full.

Justice Barrett wrote a concurring opinion, joined by Chief Justice Roberts and Justice Kavanaugh. She wrote, in response to the dissent, that the decision was not incompatible with Dobbs v. Jackson Women's Health Organization because parental rights were protected by a line of tradition. She also emphasized that the decision was preliminary, but a longer opinion than typical stay judgments was warranted due to the Ninth Circuit's apparently significant misunderstanding of Mahmoud.

Justice Kagan wrote a dissenting opinion, joined by Justice Jackson. She wrote that the Supreme Court had abused emergency docket procedures to issue a decision on the merits of the case, and that the status of substantive due process, which the opinion had relied upon, was precarious in light of Dobbs.

== Zorn v. Linton ==
- Full caption: Jacob P. Zorn v. Shela M. Linton
- Citations: 607 U.S. 568 (2026)
- Prior history: Linton v. Zorn, 135 F.4th 19 (2d Cir. 2025)
- Subsequent history: Linton v. Zorn, 2026 WL 1615029 (2d Cir. 2026)
- Laws applied: Section 1983 of the Ku Klux Klan Act
- Full text of the opinion: official slip opinion

607 U.S. 568 (2026)
Decided March 23, 2026.
The Supreme Court summarily reversed the Second Circuit's denial of qualified immunity to a police officer who used a wristlock on a protester after issuing a verbal warning because the court failed to identify a case holding that such an act violated the Constitution.

On January 8, 2015, a group of around 200 protesters staged a sit-in at the Vermont State Capitol during Peter Shumlin's third inauguration as Governor of Vermont, demanding universal healthcare. By nighttime, 29 protesters were still in the Capitol, including the respondent, Shela Linton. The protesters had seated themselves in the legislative chamber and linked their arms together. Police officers warned the protesters that they would be arrested for trespassing if they did not leave; some left voluntarily, while others had to be forced to their feet or be dragged out. One of the officers, Jacob Zorn, used a rear wristlock on Linton as a pain compliance technique to get her to stand up, but was not successful in removing her from the Capitol; Linton ultimately had to be carried out by three officers.

Linton later sued Zorn in federal district court under Section 1983, alleging that Zorn violated her Fourth Amendment right not to be subject to excessive force. The district court granted summary judgment to Zorn, finding that no case clearly established that, in the context of Zorn and Linton's situation, Zorn violated the Fourth Amendment. The Second Circuit reversed, holding that one of its prior decisions, issued in 2004, clearly established that using a rear wristlock on a protester passively resisting arrest constituted excessive force.

The Supreme Court reversed the Second Circuit because the 2004 opinion did not clearly establish that Zorn's actions were unconstitutional. Firstly, the 2004 case involved a wide array of violent conduct by officers, including throwing protesters against the ground and dragging them, of which wristlocks were but a part. Secondly, in the 2004 case, the defendant officers had not issued verbal warnings before using force, while Zorn did. Thirdly, the 2004 opinion never held that using wristlocks violated the Fourth Amendment, but rather remanded the issue for a jury trial. Thus, the 2004 opinion was not particular enough to have put an officer in Zorn's position on notice that using a wristlock would violate the Fourth Amendment.

Justice Sotomayor filed a dissenting opinion, joined by Justices Kagan and Jackson. She argued that in the 2004 case, the court had singled out wristlocks as constituting excessive force, the officers had in fact issued verbal warnings before using excessive force, and that the remand to a jury was only because there was a dispute over the material facts of the case, not over whether the conduct complained of legally constituted excessive force.

== District of Columbia v. R.W. ==
- Full caption: District of Columbia v. R.W.
- Citations: 608 U.S. 22 (2026)
- Prior history: In re R.W., 334 A.3d 593 (D.C. 2025)
- Laws applied: Fourth Amendment of the United States Constitution
- Full text of the opinion: official slip opinion

608 U.S. 22 (2026)
Decided April 20, 2026.
The Supreme Court summarily reversed the judgment of the District of Columbia Court of Appeals vacating the respondent's juvenile delinquency adjudication on Fourth Amendment grounds, as the officer who stopped the respondent clearly had reasonable suspicion to do so.

In February 2023, D.C. Metropolitan Police officer Clifford Vanterpool received a dispatch report directing him to check out a suspicious vehicle parked at an apartment complex. Upon his arrival, two people immediately fled from the vehicle, which began backing up with a passenger door still open. Vanterpool parked behind the vehicle, preventing its exit, and arrested the driver, a minor pseudonymously identified as R.W.

Using evidence gathered from the stop, R.W. was charged with unauthorized use of a motor vehicle, felony receipt of stolen property, unlawful entry of a motor vehicle, and operating a vehicle without a permit. R.W. moved to suppress the evidence on the theory that it violated his Fourth Amendment rights, but the trial court denied the motion and found R.W. delinquent on all counts. The D.C. Court of Appeals reversed the denial of the motion and vacated R.W.'s delinquency finding, finding that neither the dispatch call nor the flight of the two passengers gave Vanterpool reasonable suspicion for a stop. The prosecution appealed.

The Supreme Court reversed the D.C. Court of Appeals. According to the Supreme Court, the D.C. Court of Appeals erred by considering the dispatch call and the flight of the passengers separately; because reasonable suspicion is based upon the totality of the circumstances, the two events should have been considered together as part of the wider context informing Vanterpool's stop. The Supreme Court concluded that, taking all of the facts together, Vanterpool's decision to stop the vehicle and arrest R.W. was informed by a "commonsense inference" that the people in the vehicle had been trying to hide illegal conduct from police; he thus had reasonable suspicion.

Justice Jackson filed a dissenting opinion. She argued that the D.C. Court of Appeals had not made an error of law or method, but had at best incorrectly weighed certain facts, which is typically not for the Supreme Court to review.

Justice Sotomayor dissented without comment from the grant of certiorari.

== Hamm v. Smith ==
- Full caption: John Q. Hamm, Commissioner, Alabama Department of Corrections v. Joseph Clifton Smith
- Citations: 608 U.S. 278 (2026)
- Prior history: Smith v. Commissioner, Alabama Department of Corrections, 2024 WL 4793028 (11th Cir. 2024)
- Full text of the opinion: official slip opinion · oral argument

608 U.S. 278 (2026)
Argued December 10, 2025.
Decided May 21, 2026.
The Supreme Court dismissed as improvidently granted a petition for certiorari by the state of Alabama seeking to clarify how a court assessing a challenge to the death penalty under Atkins v. Virginia should consider multiple different IQ scores.

Joseph Clifton Smith was convicted in Alabama for capital murder after a 1997 robbery and sentenced to death. Smith filed a habeas corpus petition challenging the death sentence, claiming to have an intellectual disability. Under Atkins, it is cruel and unusual punishment, and thus unconstitutional, to execute an inmate with an intellectual disability.

Smith scored 75, 74, 72, 78, and 74 on five full-scale IQ tests, while a score of 70 or lower is considered as evidence of intellectual disability in Alabama, making one ineligible for execution.The Southern District of Alabama vacated Smith's death sentence, and the Eleventh Circuit affirmed.

The case first reached the Supreme Court in the 2024 term. In a per curiam opinion, the court summarily reversed and remanded the case for lack of clarity. On remand, the Eleventh Circuit stated that it had affirmed the district court "based on the complete record, including any relevant expert testimony." Alabama appealed again, and the Supreme Court granted certiorari as to "whether and how courts may consider the cumulative effect of multiple IQ scores in assessing an Atkins claim." The Supreme Court heard oral arguments on December 10, 2025, but dismissed the case on May 21, 2026 without a ruling.

Justice Sotomayor concurred in the dismissal, joined by Justice Jackson. She wrote that the court could not provide "any meaningful guidance" in the case because the evaluation of IQ "raise[s] complicated questions on which even experts may disagree," and the factual record was not developed enough to issue a well-reasoned decision.

Justice Alito dissented, joined by Chief Justice Roberts and Justices Gorsuch and Thomas, arguing that the case provided an opportunity to clarify Atkins. Justice Thomas also separately dissented, arguing that Atkins should be overruled.

== Margolin v. NAIJ ==
- Full caption: Daren K. Margolin, Director of the Executive Office for Immigration Review v. National Association of Immigration Judges
- Citations: 608 U.S. 339 (2026)
- Prior history: National Association of Immigration Judges v. Owen, 139 F.4th 293 (4th Cir. 2025)
- Subsequent history: National Association of Immigration Judges v. Owen, 2026 WL 2428750 (4th Cir. 2026)
- Laws applied: Principle of party presentation
- Full text of the opinion: official slip opinion

608 U.S. 339 (2026)
Decided May 26, 2026.
The Supreme Court summarily reversed the Fourth Circuit's judgment vacating and remanding a district court's finding that it lacked jurisdiction over a lawsuit involving federal employees, because the Fourth Circuit vacated and remanded based on an issue the parties had not raised, violating the principle of party presentation.

In October 2021, the Executive Office for Immigration Review implemented a rule that required immigration judges to obtain supervisory review before making a public speech relating to their official duties. The National Association of Immigration Judges (NAIJ), the professional association for immigration judges, challenged the rule in a federal district court in Virginia, alleging that it violated judges' free speech rights. The district court threw out the case because the Civil Service Reform Act of 1978 (CSRA) stripped federal district courts of jurisdiction over federal employees' work-related grievances.

The NAIJ appealed to the Fourth Circuit, arguing that the challenge to the rule did not constitute a work-related grievance. The Fourth Circuit vacated and remanded. It theorized that, due to changes in the working conditions of federal employees, the CSRA possibly did not strip federal district courts of jurisdiction over any claims at all, including work-related grievances, and remanded for factfinding on that question. The government appealed.

On appeal, the Supreme Court reversed and remanded. It determined that the Fourth Circuit's decision violated the principle of party presentation because the NAIJ had only argued that their challenge was not a work-related grievance; they had not argued that the CSRA did not strip district courts of jurisdiction over any claims, as the Fourth Circuit had speculated.

Justice Thomas concurred, joined by Justice Barrett. He argued that the Fourth Circuit's decision was also wrong on the merits; changed conditions did not mean that the CSRA no longer stripped jurisdiction over work-related claims.

== Whitton v. Dixon ==
- Full caption: Gary Richard Whitton v. Ricky D. Dixon, Secretary, Florida Department of Corrections
- Citations: 608 U.S. 493 (2026)
- Prior history: Whitton v. Secretary, Florida Department of Corrections, 2025 WL 1305158 (11th Cir. 2025)
- Laws applied: Antiterrorism and Effective Death Penalty Act of 1996
- Full text of the opinion: official slip opinion

608 U.S. 493 (2026)
Decided June 1, 2026.
The Supreme Court summarily reversed the Eleventh Circuit's decision affirming a lower court's denial of habeas relief to the petitioner, because federal appellate courts cannot consider evidence that was not presented at trial when making a harmless error determination about how the jury would have been affected by evidence that was admitted at trial.

The petitioner, Gary Whitton, had been convicted of murder and sentenced to death in Florida. During Whitton's trial, the prosecution called as a witness Jake Ozio, who had spent a stint in jail as Whitton's cellmate. Ozio testified that he heard Whitton confess to the murder. Ozio also testified that, aside from the crime which had landed him in jail, he had no prior criminal history.

Following his conviction, Whitton sought post-conviction relief in Florida state court. He argued that the prosecution knew that Ozio's testimony regarding what he had heard was false and that it influenced the jury's verdict, resulting in a constitutional error under Giglio v. United States. The Florida Supreme Court ultimately denied such relief on the basis that the evidence against Whitton was so overwhelming that Ozio's testimony made no difference; any constitutional error was thus harmless.

Whitton then sought habeas relief in a federal district court. He argued that the Florida Supreme Court's decision was unreasonable and that the constitutional error had a "substantial and injurious" effect on the jury, permitting habeas relief. During an evidentiary hearing, Ozio admitted before the district court that he did not hear Whitton confess and that he did, in fact, have a juvenile criminal record. Whitton subsequently expanded his Giglio claim to include Ozio's testimony regarding his criminal record. The district court ultimately denied relief on the grounds that the alleged error could not have influenced the jury's verdict; Florida law does not allow juvenile criminal records to be used to impeach a witness. Whitton appealed.

The Eleventh Circuit Court of Appeals affirmed the denial of habeas. It held, contrary to the district court, that Ozio's record could have been used against him. However, it also held that Ozio's testimony as a whole was immaterial to Whitton's conviction. It based this finding on the Florida Supreme Court decision, which the Eleventh Circuit found to be reasonable. However, to make this decision, it considered DNA evidence that had not been presented at trial; in fact, the evidence was gathered a decade after Whitton was convicted.

The Supreme Court vacated and remanded the Eleventh Circuit's decision because it should not have considered the DNA evidence. The evidence had no effect on the jury's verdict and was not considered by the Florida state courts, meaning that it also had no influence on whether the Florida Supreme Court's decision was reasonable. The Supreme Court remanded the case back to the Eleventh Circuit to determine if the Florida Supreme Court's decision was reasonable in light of the evidence actually presented at trial.

Justice Thomas dissented, partially joined by Justice Alito. He argued that the Eleventh Circuit's consideration of the DNA evidence was harmless in light of the evidence against Whitton, and that Whitton had no right to raise the Giglio claim regarding Ozio's criminal record in federal court, as he did not raise it in state court.

== McCarthy v. Hernandez ==
- Full caption: Kevin McCarthy, Superintendent, Elmira Correctional Facility v. Pedro Hernandez
- Citations: 608 U.S. 809 (2026)
- Prior history: Hernandez v. McIntosh, 146 F.4th 142 (2d Cir. 2025)
- Laws applied: Antiterrorism and Effective Death Penalty Act of 1996
- Full text of the opinion: official slip opinion

608 U.S. 809 (2026)
Decided June 22, 2026.
The Supreme Court summarily reversed the Second Circuit's grant of habeas relief to the respondent because no clearly established federal law requires the trial court to instruct the jury about the rule from Justice Anthony Kennedy's concurrence to Missouri v. Seibert.

The respondent, Pedro Hernandez, had been convicted of murdering Etan Patz. Patz disappeared in 1979, sparking significant public attention; he was one of the first children to be depicted on a missing-children milk carton, and his disappearance contributed to the creation of the National Center for Missing and Exploited Children. Despite this, Hernandez was not implicated in Patz's disappearance until 2012, when Hernandez's brother-in-law reported that Hernandez had made statements about his involvement in Patz's disappearance.

Detectives subsequently interrogated Hernandez, who confessed to strangling Patz to death. However, they did not give him a Miranda warning prior to his confession. The detectives subsequently gave the warning, after which Hernandez waived his Miranda rights and made a second confession on videotape. Hernandez later made a second videotaped confession to a prosecutor, also after receiving a Miranda warning and waiving his rights.

Hernandez was convicted in 2016 before a New York jury. He had sought to have his confessions either suppressed or disregarded by the jury. His argument was that his first confession was obtained in violation of his Miranda rights, which tainted the following videotaped confessions and made all three inadmissible. The court ruled that the first confession was not obtained in violation of Miranda, and also issued a jury instruction stating that, even if the first confession was obtained in violation of Miranda, it did not require the jury to disregard the following two confessions. Hernandez's conviction was upheld on appeal, with the appellate court agreeing that Hernandez's Miranda rights were not violated. The New York Court of Appeals denied further review.

Hernandez subsequently petitioned for a writ of habeas corpus in a federal district court. He argued that the trial and appellate court had erred in its jury instruction because it did not instruct the jury on Justice Kennedy's concurrence in Missouri v. Seibert. Seibert held, by a plurality, that police officers cannot circumvent Miranda requirements by interrogating suspects, then giving the warning and asking the suspect to repeat their confession. Kennedy's concurrence stated that only a "deliberate" application of such a process is unconstitutional. Hernandez claimed that under Marks v. United States, Kennedy's concurrence, as the narrowest holding among those who formed the majority in Siebert, was the case's holding for stare decisis purposes.

The district court initially denied habeas, but the Second Circuit reversed. The Second Circuit stated that Kennedy's concurrence stated a binding rule of federal law and that it was thus unreasonable for the New York courts to not instruct the jury on the concurrence. The Supreme Court reversed because, even assuming that Kennedy's concurrence was Siebert's holding, it had never been applied to jury instructions. It was thus not unreasonable for the New York courts to not instruct the jury on Kennedy's concurrence.

Justices Sotomayor, Kagan, and Jackson dissented without comment from the grant of certiorari.

== Trump v. California ==
- Full caption: Donald J. Trump, President of the United States, et al. v. California, et al.
- Citations: 609 U.S. ___ (2026)
- Prior history: California v. Trump, 183 F.4th 52 (1st Cir. 2026)
- Laws applied: Case or Controversy Clause of Article Three of the United States Constitution
- Full text of the opinion: official slip opinion

609 U.S. ___ (2026)
Decided August 24, 2026.
The Supreme Court stayed the District of Massachusetts's injunction against the executive order directing the Secretary of Homeland Security to create and distribute lists of citizens eligible to vote in upcoming elections, the Attorney General to prioritize investigating and prosecuting those who issued ballots to ineligible voters, and the Postal Service to initiate a notice of proposed rulemaking regarding mail-in ballot envelopes.

The executive order in question was challenged in federal district court shortly after its issuance by several states and the District of Columbia, arguing that the order was unconstitutional. The district court ruled in favor of the states and issued a final judgment forbidding the order's implementation. The government petitioned for a stay from the First Circuit, but the First Circuit declined; the government subsequently petitioned the Supreme Court for a stay.

The Supreme Court granted the stay. It found that the government was likely to succeed on the merits because the states did not have standing to sue the government:

- The part of the executive order directing the Secretary of Homeland Security was an internal directive which did not impose any obligations on the states; thus, the states lacked injury, a key component of standing. The only possible source of injury was potential future action from the Secretary to implement it, which was too speculative to create standing
- The part of the executive order directing the Attorney General likewise imposed no obligations on the states. Importantly, the order imposed no requirement that the states use the Secretary of Homeland Security's lists, so the order did not threaten the states for not using those lists.
- The part of the executive order directing the Postal Service only directed it to issue a notice of proposed rulemaking, not an actual proposed or final rule. Any potential injury to be caused by the rule was too speculative to create standing.

The potential of irreparable harm also favored the government because the district court's order interfered with the executive power, and without a stay, a reversal on appeal would after the 2026 elections, which would contravene the essential goals of the order. The balance of equities also favored the government; the order did not injure anyone, so the states had no equitable justification for a stay.

Justice Sotomayor, joined by Justice Kagan, dissented. She argued that the government had already admitted that the states' failure to use the lists could be the basis for law enforcement activity, and that it intended to implement the order immediately, defeating any claims of speculation.

Justice Jackson dissented separately. She argued that the orders were illegal because they interfered with the states' power to conduct federal elections. She also wrote that the government could not show irreparable harm because the orders were illegal to begin with, and that the balance of equities favored the states because the order disrupted their normal election-organization activity.

== National Park Service v. National Trust for Historic Preservation in the United States ==
- Full caption: National Park Service, et al. v. National Trust for Historic Preservation in the United States
- Citations: 609 U.S. ___ (2026)
- Prior history: National Trust for Historic Preservation in the United States v. NPS, 185 F.4th 1185 (D.C. Cir. 2026)
- Laws applied: Case or Controversy Clause of Article Three of the United States Constitution
- Full text of the opinion: official slip opinion

609 U.S. ___ (2026)
Decided August 31, 2026.
The Supreme Court stayed the D.C. District Court's injunction against the demolition of the East Wing of the White House.

The challenged demolition began in October 2025, with the goal of replacing the East Wing with a ballroom. The National Trust for Historic Preservation, a D.C. nonprofit, sued the federal government, additionally moving for an injunction blocking the East Wing's demolition. The district court granted the injunction on March 31, 2026. On April 17, 2026, the D.C. Circuit stayed the injunction, but on August 7 of that year, the appeals court upheld the injunction and stated that the stay would expire on August 21. The federal government subsequently petitioned the Supreme Court for a second stay, with Chief Justice Roberts initially granting an administrative stay to permit the Court to consider the petition.

The Court granted the stay:

- The government was likely to succeed on the merits because the National Trust lacked standing to sue. The National Trust's sole injury was that one of its members professed a personal distaste for the proposed ballroom's aesthetics. The Court stated that "mere offense, disagreement, or distaste" is not an injury sufficient to confer standing to sue, and to hold otherwise would be to over-expand standing.
- The government was likely to suffer irreparable harm because the court had exceeded its lawful authority to enjoin the actions of the executive.
- The balance of equities favored the government because the proposed ballroom, or at least an object of its dimensions and mass, was necessary to protect an underground military installation being built at the same time; the national security interests underlying the underground installation far outweighed the National Trust's interest in aesthetics.

Chief Justice Roberts dissented, joined by Justices Sotomayor, Kagan, and Jackson. He wrote that the National Trust's injury was more than "mere offense" because "the White House is an iconic American building whose symbolism and history are wrapped up in its architecture;" and because the National Trust member who would suffer injury had a strong interest in preserving historic structures, being a long-time member of the Trust with a leadership role, as well as a history professor.

== National Republican Congressional Committee v. Brown ==
- Full caption: National Republican Congressional Committee, et al. v. Sherrod Brown, et al.
- Citations: 609 U.S. ___ (2026)
- Prior history: Brown v. Federal Communications Commission, 189 F.4th 362 (4th Cir. 2026)
- Laws applied: Communications Act of 1934
- Full text of the opinion: official slip opinion

609 U.S. ___ (2026)
Decided September 4, 2026.
The Supreme Court stayed the Fourth Circuit's mandate setting aside the Federal Communications Commission's (FCC) public notice extending the lowest unit charge to groups other than candidates for political office.

On March 30, 2026, the FCC issued a public notice stating that "political candidates, joint fundraising committees with noncandidate members, and political parties engaged in coordinated political activity" were entitled to a favorable broadcast charge known as the "lowest unit charge" (LUC). On April 29, four Democratic Party candidates for office filed an application for review within the FCC, arguing that only political candidates themselves were eligible for the LUC. While the application was pending, the candidates also filed for review in the Fourth Circuit Court of Appeals.

On August 25, the Fourth Circuit determined that it had jurisdiction and set aside the public notice as unlawful. The National Republican Congressional Committee and the National Republican Senatorial Committee, who were intervenors in the Fourth Circuit case, petitioned the Supreme Court for a stay.

The Supreme Court granted the stay. It concluded that the Fourth Circuit probably lacked jurisdiction to review the FCC's decision because the candidates still had a pending application for review before the FCC; according to the Supreme Court, the FCC had to complete its review before the candidates could petition the Fourth Circuit. Furthermore, the NRCC and NRSC showed a risk of irreparable harm because broadcasters were already rescinding LUC rates as a result of the Fourth Circuit's decision.

Justice Jackson dissented. She believed that the Fourth Circuit had jurisdiction.

== Department of Homeland Security v. League of Women Voters ==
- Full caption: Department of Homeland Security, et al. v. League of Women Voters, et al.
- Citations: 609 U.S. ___ (2026)
- Prior history: League of Women Voters v. Department of Homeland Security, 2026 WL 2643439 (D.C. Cir. 2026)
- Laws applied: Illegal Immigration Reform and Immigrant Responsibility Act of 1996
- Full text of the opinion: official slip opinion

609 U.S. ___ (2026)
Decided September 25, 2026.
The Supreme Court stayed the D.C. District Court's judgment setting aside the usage of the Systematic Alien Verification for Entitlements to verify the citizenship status of registered voters.

The Department of Homeland Security (DHS) began using SAVE to verify voters' citizenship in May 2025, additionally beginning to add files from the Social Security Administration to the SAVE database. Several organizations challenged the DHS's usage of SAVE, arguing that it violated provisions of the Social Security Act, Privacy Act of 1974, and Administrative Procedure Act. The D.C. District Court agreed with the plaintiffs on all three counts and vacated the new SAVE system. The D.C. Circuit denied the federal government's application for a stay, prompting the government to seek a stay from the Supreme Court.

The Supreme Court granted the stay:

- The government was likely to succeed on the merits because the Illegal Immigration Reform and Immigrant Responsibility Act of 1996 (IIRIRA) expressly granted the government the ability to obtain "information regarding the citizenship or immigration status, lawful or unlawful, of any individual" without impediment from any other laws. The IIRIRA thus overrode the laws which the plaintiffs had challenged the new SAVE system under.
- The government was likely to suffer irreparable harm because it had "an obligation to respond to requests from state and local election officials seeking to verify the citizenship of voters," which the district court's order prevented.

Justice Jackson dissented, joined by Justices Sotomayor and Kagan. She argued that the Court has misread the IIRIRA, which prevented government agencies from restricting DHS's access to citizenship information, rather than affirmatively granting the government any power, and that the government faced no harm from the district court's order because the new SAVE system was unlawful to start.

== People Not Politicians v. Onder ==
- Full caption: People Not Politicians, et al. v. Robert Onder, et al.
- Citations: 609 U.S. ___ (2026)
- Prior history: Onder v. Missouri, 2026 WL 2824043 (8th Cir. 2026)
- Laws applied: Purcell principle
- Full text of the opinion: official slip opinion

609 U.S. ___ (2026)
Decided September 25, 2026.
The Supreme Court stayed the Eighth Circuit's mandate and order requiring Missouri to use its 2025 redistricting map instead of its 2022.

The case centered around two redistricting maps passed by the Missouri legislature: one from 2022, and one from 2025. The distinction mattered for the upcoming 2026 House of Representatives elections because the 2025 map would likely grant the Republican Party one more seat in the House than the 2022 map.

Under Missouri's constitution, the 2025 map could not go into effect until it was approved by a referendum in the next state elections, which was simultaneous with the House elections. The Missouri Supreme Court accordingly held that the 2025 map had not gone into effect and that the 2026 House election was to be conducted using the 2022 map. A group of voters and candidates sued in a Missouri-based federal district court on the theory that the U.S. Constitution required the 2025 map.

The case had been subject to two prior stays. On September 3, 2025, Missouri's secretary of state petitioned the Supreme Court to stay the Missouri Supreme Court decision; five days later, Justice Kavanaugh acted unilaterally as circuit justice to deny the petition. The same day, the federal district court issued a temporary restraining order requiring Missouri to use the 2025 map. Two days later, the Court stayed the order. On September 21, the Eighth Circuit ordered the district court to issue a permanent injunction, again requiring Missouri to use the 2025 map.

The Supreme Court stayed the Eighth Circuit order because there was no case law supporting the idea that Missouri had to use the 2025 map, and because the Purcell principle of federal courts not interfering with state election rules just before the election takes place applied (particularly because absentee voting had already begun). The Court also noted that the Missouri Supreme Court decision did not violate the principle, which does not apply to state courts.
