= Villarreal v. Texas =

- Supreme Court of the United States

Argued October 6, 2025 Decided February 25, 2026
- Full case name: David Asa Villarreal, Petitioner, v. Texas, Respondent.
- Docket no.: 24-557
- Citations: 607 U.S. 465 (more)
- Argument: Oral argument
- Decision: Opinion

Case history
- Prior: Texas District Court, 186th Judicial District, Bexar County: Villarreal v. State, No. 2016-CR-0549 (June 25, 2018).; Court of Appeals of Texas: Villarreal v. State, No. 04-18-00484-CR (December 27, 2019); Court of Criminal Appeals of Texas: Villarreal v. State, No. PD-0048-20 (October 9, 2024); Cert. granted. 606 U.S. ___ (2025).

Questions presented
- Whether a trial court abridges a defendant's Sixth Amendment right to counsel by prohibiting the defendant and his counsel from discussing the defendant's testimony during an overnight recess.

Holding
- Prohibiting discussion of a defendant's testimony during a mid-testimony overnight recess does not violate the Sixth Amendment.

Court membership
- Chief Justice John Roberts Associate Justices Clarence Thomas · Samuel Alito; Sonia Sotomayor · Elena Kagan; Neil Gorsuch · Brett Kavanaugh; Amy Coney Barrett · Ketanji Brown Jackson

Case opinions
- Majority: Jackson, joined by Roberts, Alito, Sotomayor, Kagan, Kavanaugh, Barrett
- Concurrence: Alito
- Concurrence: Thomas (in judgment), joined by Gorsuch

Laws applied
- Sixth Amendment

Villarreal v. Texas 607 U.S. 465 (2026) is a United States Supreme Court case in which the court held that prohibiting discussion of a defendant's testimony during a mid-testimony overnight recess does not violate the Sixth Amendment's right to counsel.

== Background ==
In 2018, the 186th Texas District court trial of David Villarreal was being conducted over the murder of his boyfriend and drug supplier, Aaron Estrada. Villarreal, who was on drugs and suffering from paranoia at the time of the murder, claimed self defense in his stabbing of Estrada. Villarreal was the only defense witness in the trial, and he was being questioned on direct examination for an hour until the Judge ordered a planned 24 hour recess, due to a scheduling conflict of the Judge. Villarreal would be allowed to continue his testimony the next day. During this recess, though Villarreal would be allowed to confer with his defense lawyers, the judge ordered him not to talk about that day's testimony with them. The Judge told the lawyers "I don’t want you discussing what you couldn’t discuss with him if he was on the stand in front of the jury". His lawyers object, citing the Sixth Amendment, but complied with the order. Villarreal was later convicted and sentenced to sixty years in prison.

Villarreal argued that not being able to talk to his lawyers during the recess violated his Sixth Amendment right to counsel. The Court of Appeals affirmed his conviction in a 2-1 vote. The Texas Court of Criminal Appeals then also affirmed his conviction, noting that the trial court did not violate the Sixth Amendment if it only placed barriers on talking about the ongoing testimony.

== Supreme Court ==
On November 13, 2024, Villarreal petitioned the Supreme Court for review. On April 7, 2025, the Court granted certiorari. The case was argued on October 6, with an opinion expected by the summer of 2026. At oral arguments, the petitioner was represented by Stuart Banner, a legal historian and the director of UCLA's Supreme Court Clinic. The respondent was represented by Assistant Criminal District Attorney Andrew Warthen, who was first lawyer to argue a case in front of the Supreme Court in a wheel chair in 20 years, due to him throwing his back out that morning.
