= Cruel and unusual =

Cruel and unusual may refer to:

- Cruel and Unusual (novel), a novel by Patricia Cornwell
- Cruel and Unusual (comics), a 1999 comic book series
- Cruel and Unusual: Bush/Cheney's New World Order, a book by Mark Crispin Miller
- Cruel and Unusual, a 2005 album by Black Sun Empire
- Cruel and Unusual (2006 film), a 2006 documentary film
- Cruel and Unusual (2014 film), a 2014 thriller film
- Cruel and Unusual Films, an American film production company
- Watchtower (2001 film), a 2001 Canadian thriller film also released under the title Cruel and Unusual

== See also ==
- Cruel and unusual punishment
