= Rico v. United States =

- Supreme Court of the United States

Argued November 3, 2025 Decided March 25, 2026
- Full case name: Isabel Rico v. United States
- Docket no.: 24-1056
- Citations: 607 U.S. (more)
- Argument: Oral argument
- Decision: Opinion

Case history
- Prior: Defendant pled guilty. United States v. Rico, No. 10-cr-381 (C.D. Cal. 2010).; Defendant sentenced. No. 10-cr-381 (C.D. Cal. 2023).; Remanded for resentencing. No. 23-807 (9th Cir. 2023).; Defendant resentenced. No. 10-cr-381 (C.D. Cal. 2024).; Sentence affirmed. No. 24-2662 (9th Cir. 2025).; Cert. granted. 606 U.S. ___ (2025).

Questions presented
- Whether the fugitive-tolling doctrine applies in the context of supervised release.

Holding
- The Sentencing Reform Act does not authorize a rule automatically extending a defendant's term of supervised release when the defendant fails to report to probation.

Court membership
- Chief Justice John Roberts Associate Justices Clarence Thomas · Samuel Alito; Sonia Sotomayor · Elena Kagan; Neil Gorsuch · Brett Kavanaugh; Amy Coney Barrett · Ketanji Brown Jackson

Case opinions
- Majority: Gorsuch, joined by Roberts, Thomas, Sotomayor, Kagan, Kavanaugh, Barrett, Jackson
- Dissent: Alito

Laws applied
- Sentencing Reform Act

Rico v. United States, 607 U.S.___ (2026), was a United States Supreme Court case in which the court held that the Sentencing Reform Act does not authorize a rule automatically extending a defendant’s term of supervised release when the defendant fails to report to probation. This case was about the fugitive-tolling doctrine.

== Background ==
In 2010, Isabel Rico pled guilty to a drug trafficking offense in the Central District of California, and was sentenced to 84 months' imprisonment to be followed by a four-year term of supervised release. After her release from prison in 2017, Rico violated the terms of her supervised release, and was sentenced to 2 additional months' imprisonment to be followed by 42 months' supervised release. Rico was again released from prison in December 2017, with her 42-month term of supervised release set to end in June 2021. After failing a drug test, a probation officer attempted to place Rico in an outpatient drug rehabilitation program. However, Rico did not report and subsequently lost contact with the officer. The probation officer determined that Rico had absconded, and a bench warrant for her arrest issued.

Rico was rearrested in January 2023, nearly a year and a half after the expiration of her term of supervised release. The probation office determined that, in addition to her absconding, Rico had committed state law offenses while she was a fugitive. In January 2021 (prior to the June 2021 supervised release expiration) Rico evaded police and drove without a license. In January 2022 (after the supervised release expiration) Rico possessed drugs with the intent to distribute. The United States Sentencing Guidelines classified the former two as Class C violations, and the latter as a Class A violation. Rico admitted to the violations, but argued that the district court lacked jurisdiction to sentence her for violations that occurred after the June 2021 supervised release expiration. Prosecutors countered that the term of supervised release was tolled when Rico absconded in May 2018, and that she was thus still technically on supervised release when she committed the 2022 drug offense. The district court, bound by Ninth Circuit precedent, held that the fugitive-tolling doctrine applied in the supervised release context, and sentenced her on the Grade A drugs offense. She was resentenced to 16 months' imprisonment (below the sentencing guidelines range, but above the alternative range had the June 2022 offense not been included) to be followed by 2 years' supervised release. Rico appealed her sentence to the Ninth Circuit, which, applying Circuit precedent, affirmed. The Court of Appeals additionally declined to revisit its position on the fugitive-tolling doctrine en banc.

== Supreme Court ==
On April 3, 2025, Rico petitioned the Supreme Court for review. On June 30, the Court granted certiorari. The case was heard for oral arguments on November 3, 2025. The court published an opinion on March 25, 2026.
