= Mullin v. Al Otro Lado =

- Supreme Court of the United States

Decided June 25, 2026
- Full case name: Markwayne Mullin, Secretary of Homeland Security, et al., Petitioners v. Al Otro Lado, a California Corporation, et al.
- Docket no.: 25-5

Holding
- A non-citizen "arrives in the United States" under the Immigration and Nationality Act only when they cross the border, so the INA neither entitles a non-citizen standing in Mexico to apply for asylum nor requires an immigration officer to inspect them.

Court membership
- Chief Justice John Roberts Associate Justices Clarence Thomas · Samuel Alito; Sonia Sotomayor · Elena Kagan; Neil Gorsuch · Brett Kavanaugh; Amy Coney Barrett · Ketanji Brown Jackson

Case opinions
- Majority: Alito, joined by Roberts, Thomas, Gorsuch, Kavanaugh, Barrett
- Concurrence: Thomas
- Dissent: Sotomayor, joined by Kagan, Jackson
- Dissent: Jackson

Mullin v. Al Otro Lado (formerly Noem v. Al Otro Lado) (No. 25-5) is a United States Supreme Court case in which the court held that a non-citizen "arrives in the United States" under the Immigration and Nationality Act only when they cross the border, so the INA neither entitles a non-citizen standing in Mexico to apply for asylum nor requires an immigration officer to inspect them. The case was about whether a non-citizen who is stopped on the Mexican side of the U.S.–Mexico border has "arrived in the United States" for purposes of asylum eligibility and inspection under the Immigration and Nationality Act.

== Background ==
Section 1158(a)(1) of the Immigration and Nationality Act (INA) states that "[a]ny alien who is physically present in the United States or who arrives in the United States (whether or not at a designated port of arrival)" may apply for asylum. Likewise, § 1225(a)(1) of the INA provides that an alien "present in the United States who has not been admitted or who arrives in the United States … shall be deemed for purposes of this chapter an applicant for admission," and § 1225(a)(3) requires that such applicants "shall be inspected by immigration officers."

Since at least 2016, U.S. Customs and Border Protection (CBP) directed individuals seeking inspection and asylum to remain in Mexico when ports of entry were deemed at capacity rather than letting them queue on U.S. soil. Under this system, officers instructed asylum-seekers to wait outside the United States—sometimes placing them on informal waitlists maintained in Mexico—though there was no statute explicitly authorizing the refusal to inspect. The metering policy intersected with other executive measures adopted in the same period, heightening its practical and legal consequences. For example, in July 2019, the administration promulgated a rule limiting asylum eligibility based on transit through third countries—a so-called "Transit Rule."

== Lower court history ==
=== District court ===
In 2017, the immigrant-rights organization Al Otro Lado, Inc. together with thirteen individual asylum-seekers filed a putative class-action complaint in the U.S. District Court for the Southern District of California, challenging CBP's "metering" policy. They alleged that when asylum-seekers reached a land port of entry but were instructed to remain on the Mexican side due to "capacity" constraints, CBP unlawfully withheld the inspection or processing required by the INA and the Administrative Procedure Act (APA). The complaint included claims under APA § 706(1) for withholding agency action, APA § 706(2), the INA's inspection and asylum-eligibility provisions, the Alien Tort Statute, and the Due Process Clause of the Fifth Amendment. The district court denied in relevant part the government's motion to dismiss, concluding that the plaintiffs stated a valid claim that CBP's metering practice could violate the INA's inspection duties.

Following class certification and both parties motioning for summary judgment, the district court in September 2021 granted summary judgment in the plaintiffs' favor on the APA § 706(1) and Due Process claims, holding that the metering policy unlawfully withheld inspection or asylum-processing obligations. It reserved the APA § 706(2) claim, which it did not reach. In August 2022, the court entered a final judgment declaring that the government may not deny inspection or asylum processing to noncitizens "in the process of arriving in the United States at Class A Ports of Entry" absent express statutory authority, and issued a permanent injunction prohibiting application of the later "Asylum Transit Rule" to affected class-members and ordering reopenings of past denials.

=== Court of appeals ===
In its opinion of October 23, 2024, the Ninth Circuit confronted whether the government's "metering" policy—under which the U.S. Customs and Border Protection (CBP) directed non-citizens seeking asylum to wait on the Mexican side of a U.S.–Mexico land border port of entry before being processed—violated the inspector-and-asylum-eligibility provisions of the Immigration and Nationality Act (INA) and the Administrative Procedure Act (APA). The panel held that noncitizens who present themselves at the threshold of a U.S. port of entry—even if physically located in Mexico—have "arrived in the United States" under 8 U.S.C. § 1158(a)(1) and § 1225(a)(1), and consequently must be inspected under § 1225(a)(3). The court thus affirmed the district court's conclusion that the metering policy unlawfully withheld inspection and asylum-processing duties owed to the class of asylum‐seekers.

The Ninth Circuit further addressed remedy: it largely upheld the district court's nationwide injunctive relief, including the prohibition on applying the so-called "Asylum Transit Rule" to class members who were turned away under metering before that rule's effective date. In doing so, the panel rejected the government's mootness argument despite the fact that CBP's formal metering guidance had been rescinded, holding that ongoing or forward-looking relief remains appropriate because class members continue to face consequences of the prior policy. The court then denied rehearing en banc on May 14, 2025.

== Supreme Court ==
On July 1, 2025, the petitioners (Secretaries of Homeland Security and CBP) filed a petition for a writ of certiorari, seeking review of the Ninth Circuit's decision that an alien stopped on the Mexican side of the U.S.–Mexico border "arrives in the United States" under the INA. On November 17, 2025, the Supreme Court granted certiorari. Oral arguments were heard on March 24, 2026, as part of the 2025 term.

=== Decision ===
The Court issued its decision on June 25, 2026. In a 6–3 ruling split along ideological lines, it held that a non-citizen "arrives in the United States" under the Immigration and Nationality Act only when they cross the border, so the INA neither entitles a non-citizen standing in Mexico to apply for asylum nor requires an immigration officer to inspect them.
