= Bost v. Illinois State Board of Elections =

- Supreme Court of the United States

Argued October 8, 2025 Decided January 14, 2026
- Full case name: Michael J. Bost, et al., v. Illinois State Board of Elections, et al.
- Docket no.: 24-568
- Citations: 607 U.S. 71 (more)
- Argument: Oral argument
- Opinion announcement: Opinion announcement

Questions presented
- Whether petitioners, as federal candidates, have pleaded sufficient factual allegations to show Article III standing to challenge state time, place, and manner regulations concerning their federal elections.

Holding
- A candidate for federal office has standing to challenge time, place, and manner regulations created by a state that affect the candidate's federal election.

Court membership
- Chief Justice John Roberts Associate Justices Clarence Thomas · Samuel Alito; Sonia Sotomayor · Elena Kagan; Neil Gorsuch · Brett Kavanaugh; Amy Coney Barrett · Ketanji Brown Jackson

Case opinions
- Majority: Roberts, joined by Thomas, Alito, Gorsuch, Kavanaugh
- Concurrence: Barrett (in judgment), joined by Kagan
- Dissent: Jackson, joined by Sotomayor

Laws applied
- Article III standing

Bost v. Illinois State Board of Elections, 607 U.S. 71 (2026), is a United States Supreme Court case, in which the court held that a candidate for federal office has standing to challenge time, place, and manner regulations created by a state that affect the candidate's federal election.

== Background ==
Federal law sets Election Day as the Tuesday after the first Monday in November. There is no provision in federal election law that allows ballots to be collected after the polls close on Election Day.

Illinois sets Election Day on the same Tuesday. Mail-in ballots there are still collected after the polls close if they are postmarked no later than Election Day. Ballots collected with a valid postmark or certification and received within two weeks of Election Day are counted. The two sets of rules were at odds. A lawsuit was filed to resolve the discrepancy.

== Lower court history ==
In May 2022, Illinois representative Mike Bost, joined by two presidential elector nominees, Laura Pollastrini and Susan Sweeney, sued the Illinois State Board of Elections. The plaintiffs, represented by Judicial Watch, contended that a state law allowing postal ballots postmarked on or before Election Day to be counted if they are received within fourteen days, while ballots with an illegible postmark or lacking a postmark may be counted so long as the ballot was signed and dated before Election Day. The lawsuit cited the establishment of Election Day and claimed that Bost was subject to harm. The plaintiffs filed their lawsuit in the District Court for the Northern District of Illinois. In November, hours after midterm elections had closed, Judge John F. Kness set oral arguments over a motion to dismiss the lawsuit for December, averting uncertainty over the counting of ballots in the states. Kness dismissed the lawsuit in July 2023, stating that the plaintiffs lacked legal standing to sue the board of elections. In August 2024, the Court of Appeals for the Seventh Circuit upheld Kness's decision in a 2–1 vote.

== U.S. Supreme Court ==
On November 20, 2024, the plaintiffs appealed to the U.S. Supreme Court. The Court agreed to hear the case on June 2, 2025 and heard oral arguments on October 8, 2025.

The case was then reversed and remanded, 7–2, in an opinion by Chief Justice Roberts on January 14, 2026. Justice Barrett filed an opinion concurring in the judgment, joined by Justice Kagan. Justice Jackson filed a dissenting opinion, joined by Justice Sotomayor. The court held that as a candidate for office, member of Congress Michael Bost has standing to challenge the rules that govern the counting of votes in his election.

== See also ==
- Watson v. Republican National Committee
- Lujan v. Defenders of Wildlife
