= GEO Group, Inc. v. Menocal =

- Supreme Court of the United States

Argued November 10, 2025 Decided February 25, 2026
- Full case name: The GEO Group, Inc. v. Alejandro Menocal, et al.
- Docket no.: 24-758
- Citations: 607 U.S. 438 (more)
- Argument: Oral argument
- Decision: Opinion

Questions presented
- Under 28 U.S.C. § 1291, the courts of appeals "have jurisdiction of appeals from all final decisions of the district courts." This Court has held that certain orders are immediately appealable under Section 1291 even though they do not terminate the litigation. Such "collateral orders" include orders denying claims of absolute immunity, qualified immunity, and state sovereign immunity. The question presented, which has divided the circuit courts 5-3, is whether an order denying a government contractor's claim of derivative sovereign immunity is immediately appealable under the collateral-order doctrine.

Holding
- An order denying a government contractor's claim of derivative sovereign immunity cannot be immediately appealed.

Court membership
- Chief Justice John Roberts Associate Justices Clarence Thomas · Samuel Alito; Sonia Sotomayor · Elena Kagan; Neil Gorsuch · Brett Kavanaugh; Amy Coney Barrett · Ketanji Brown Jackson

Case opinions
- Majority: Kagan, joined by Roberts, Sotomayor, Gorsuch, Kavanaugh, Barrett, Jackson; Thomas (parts I and III)
- Concurrence: Thomas (in part and in judgment)
- Concurrence: Alito (in judgment)

The GEO Group, Inc. v. Menocal, 607 U.S. 438 (2026), is a United States Supreme Court case in which the court held that an order denying a government contractor's claim of derivative sovereign immunity cannot be immediately appealed.

== Background ==
The GEO Group operates the Aurora Immigration Processing Center under United States Immigration and Customs Enforcement contract. The center ran a Voluntary Work Program where detainees could work for compensation of $1.00 per day, which Menocal filed suit under the Trafficking Victims Protection Act and Colorado's prohibition against unjust enrichment. GEO claimed its actions were protected under derivative sovereign immunity which was denied by the District of Colorado. The 10th Circuit dismissed the appeal by the GEO Group for lack of appellate jurisdiction.

The Supreme Court granted certiorari.
