= Case v. Montana =

- Supreme Court of the United States

Argued October 15, 2025 Decided January 14, 2026
- Full case name: William Trevor Case, Petitioner v. Montana
- Docket no.: 24-624
- Citations: 607 U.S. 107 (more)
- Argument: Oral argument
- Decision: Opinion

Case history
- Prior: Defendant convicted. State v. Case, Case No. 21-100 (2023).; Affirmed. 553 P.3d 985 (Mont. 2024).; Cert. granted. 605 U.S. ___ (2025).

Questions presented
- Whether law enforcement may enter a home without a search warrant based on less than probable cause that an emergency is occurring, or whether the emergency-aid exception requires probable cause.

Holding
- An officer may enter a home without a warrant if they have an objectively reasonable basis for believing that an occupant is seriously injured or imminently threatened with such injury.

Court membership
- Chief Justice John Roberts Associate Justices Clarence Thomas · Samuel Alito; Sonia Sotomayor · Elena Kagan; Neil Gorsuch · Brett Kavanaugh; Amy Coney Barrett · Ketanji Brown Jackson

Case opinions
- Majority: Kagan, joined by unanimous
- Concurrence: Sotomayor
- Concurrence: Gorsuch

Laws applied
- U.S. Const. amend. IV

Case v. Montana 607 U.S. 107 (2026) is a United States Supreme Court case regarding the scope of the Fourth Amendment’s "emergency aid" exception—specifically, whether police may enter a home without a warrant based solely on a reasonable belief that someone inside needs help, or whether probable cause is required. The court held that "an officer may enter a home without a warrant if he has “an objectively reasonable basis for believing that an occupant is seriously injured or imminently threatened with such injury," and that "the officers' entry satisfied that test."

== Background ==
=== Factual background ===
In September 2021, William Trevor Case was at home in Anaconda, Montana, during what his partner reported as a mental health crisis. She called 911 saying Case was suicidal, describing a loud "click" like a gun and then silence on the line. Officers arrived and tried repeatedly to call out and make contact, but received no response. Concerned someone inside might be hurt or dead, they entered the home about 40 minutes after they first arrived without a warrant under the "emergency aid" exception to the Fourth Amendment. The officers announced themselves upon entry to the home. In an upstairs bedroom, Case emerged from a closet with a handgun, leading one officer to shoot Case in the abdomen.

=== Legal background ===
After the warrantless entry, Case was charged with felony assault of a police officer. He filed a motion to suppress, arguing that the police violated his Fourth Amendment rights because they entered without a warrant or probable cause of any actual emergency. The Montana trial court denied the motion, holding that officers had an objectively reasonable belief that someone inside needed emergency aid. Case was convicted. He appealed to the Montana Supreme Court, which affirmed the trial court’s ruling. That court applied the "emergency aid" exception as articulated in past U.S. Supreme Court decisions, holding that officers do not need probable cause of an actual emergency, only an objectively reasonable basis to believe someone needs help.

== Supreme Court ==
On December 4, 2024, Case petitioned the United States Supreme Court for review. On June 2, 2025, the Court granted certiorari. A decision was rendered on January 14, 2026.

== See also ==
- Brigham City v. Stuart, 547 U.S. 398 (2006) (9–0): "Emergency aid" exception to the warrant requirement allows police to make a warrantless entry into a home when they have "an objectively reasonable basis for believing that an occupant is seriously injured or imminently threatened with such injury."
