= Bowe v. United States =

- Supreme Court of the United States

Decided January 9, 2026
- Full case name: Bowe v. United States
- Docket no.: 24-5438
- Citations: 607 U.S. 13 (more)
- Opinion announcement: Opinion announcement

Holding
- Under AEDPA, people in federal custody may (1) petition the Supreme Court for review when a court of appeal denies them authorization to file a successive habeas petititon, and (2) reraise arguments that were dismissed during their first habeas petition in the successive petition.

Court membership
- Chief Justice John Roberts Associate Justices Clarence Thomas · Samuel Alito; Sonia Sotomayor · Elena Kagan; Neil Gorsuch · Brett Kavanaugh; Amy Coney Barrett · Ketanji Brown Jackson

Case opinions
- Majority: Sotomayor, joined by Roberts, Kagan, Kavanaugh, Jackson
- Concurrence: Jackson
- Dissent: Gorsuch, joined by Thomas, Alito; Barrett (Part I only)

Laws applied
- Antiterrorism and Effective Death Penalty Act

Bowe v. United States, 607 U.S. 13 (2026), was a United States Supreme Court case in which the court decided how a jurisdiction stripping provision of the Anti-terrorism and Effective Death Penalty Act applied to the Supreme Court. The court held that the provision stripped the court of the ability to review the decision to deny an incarcerated person an additional habeas corpus opportunity when the person is held by states but not when they are held by the federal government. Additionally, the court held that a restriction on what an incarcerated person may argue in their additional habeas petition applies to people in state custody but not federal custody.
