= Mirabelli v. Bonta =

Ongoing Ninth Circuit court case

Mirabelli v. Bonta is a case in the Ninth Circuit Court of Appeals challenging a California law that requires a school to support a transgender child in social transitioning and prohibits the schools from telling the child's parents about the transition without the child's consent. The trial court permanently enjoined enforcement of the policies, and the Ninth Circuit stayed the injunction pending appeal. Then in 2026, the United States Supreme Court granted an application to vacate the stay and sent the case back down to the Ninth Circuit holding that the stay was warranted, at the preliminary stage in litigation, because parents were likely to succeed on their free exercise and substantive due process claims.

== Background ==
In 2023, two teachers filled a lawsuit in the United States District Court for the Southern District of California, seeking an exemption from their school district's policies regarding students' gender. During litigation, the school district claimed that state law, as interpreted by the California attorney general and California Department of Education, required it to adopt these policies. So, the teachers added state officials as defendants and parents of California schoolchildren joined the lawsuit as plaintiffs. The plaintiffs objected to California's policies prohibiting the disclosure of a student's gender transitioning at school to a parent only if the student consented. The plaintiffs claimed that these policies violated their rights under the Free Exercise Clause of the First Amendment and the Due Process Clause of the Fourteenth Amendment.

Later, the plaintiffs sought classwide relief, and the federal District Court certified a class with separate subclasses for parents and teachers. One subclass of parents comprised all those who objected to the challenged policies, while a separate subclass was limited to those who seek a religious exemption. Two similar subclasses of teachers were also certified.

The court granted summary judgment for all plaintiffs and entered a permanent injunction in their favor. The injunction prevented the schools from "misleading" parents about their children's gender presentation at school and their social transitioning efforts. It also required the schools to follow parents' directions regarding their children's names and pronouns. And it compelled defendants to include in state-created or approved instructional materials a notice of the rights protected by the injunction.

The Ninth Circuit Court of Appeals granted the defendants' motion to stay the injunction pending appeal. It began by raising procedural objections to the District Court's injunction. It claimed that the District Court had granted class certification without undertaking the "rigorous analysis" required by Federal Rule of Civil Procedure 23. And it stated that the injunction appeared to be overly broad because it "covers every parent of California's millions of public school students and every public school employee in the state." As a result, it opined, the injunction seemed to grant relief to uninjured class members who lacked Article III standing.

The Ninth Circuit also expressed doubts about the District Court's decision on the merits. On the free exercise issue, it relied on a not-precedential Sixth Circuit Court of Appeals decision and described Mahmoud v. Taylor as "a narrow decision focused on uniquely coercive 'curricular requirements.'" The Ninth Circuit expressed skepticism about the parents' and teachers' Fourteenth Amendment due process claim because it viewed those claims as seeking to expand the protection afforded by established precedent.

When the Ninth Circuit stayed the injunction, the parents and teachers filed an application to the Supreme Court seeking vacatur of the Ninth Circuit’s stay pending appeal.

== Supreme Court ==
Mirabelli v. Bonta
- Supreme Court of the United States

Decided March 2, 2026
- Full case name: Mirabelli v. Bonta
- Docket no.: 25A810
- Citations: 607 U.S. 492 (more)

Holding
- Stay granted for the parents and denied for other plaintiffs. It is likely that California cannot require a child's consent before a school may tell a parent about that child's gender transitioning at school or require that schools use children's preferred names and pronouns regardless of their parents' wishes.

Court membership
- Chief Justice John Roberts Associate Justices Clarence Thomas · Samuel Alito; Sonia Sotomayor · Elena Kagan; Neil Gorsuch · Brett Kavanaugh; Amy Coney Barrett · Ketanji Brown Jackson

Case opinions
- Per curiam
- Concurrence: Barrett, joined by Roberts, Kavanaugh
- Dissent: Kagan, joined by Jackson

The Supreme Court approved the stay as it related to the parents with a per curiam order on March 2, 2026. The court denied the stay for the other plaintiffs. The court determined the parent plaintiffs seeking religious exemptions to California's school district policies requiring schools to keep students' gender transitioning information and knowledge confidential are likely to succeed on their Free Exercise and Due Process claims. The Ninth Circuit's procedural objections regarding parent and teacher class certifications were deemed unlikely to prevail.

Justices Clarence Thomas and Samuel Alito would have granted the application in full. Justice Sonia Sotomayor would have denied the application in full. Justice Amy Coney Barrett wrote a concurrence with the order that Justices John Roberts and Brett Kavanaugh joined. Justice Elena Kagan wrote a dissent joined by Justice Ketanji Brown Jackson.

=== Reactions ===
The justices' opinions discussed substantive due process, prompting responses in opposition to that doctrine. Ian Millhiser wrote "Mirabelli is one of the most consequential constitutional decisions the Roberts Court has ever handed down" and "the height of judicial hypocrisy".

== Current status ==
The case returned to the Ninth Circuit for further proceedings. The Supreme Court's order vacating the Ninth Circuit's stay, and therefore reinstating the district court judge's injunction as litigation proceeded, stated that "when gender incongruence is observed... parents have a right to be informed." The exact contours of the ruling, such as what it means to have "observed" "gender incongruence", are unclear.
