= Galette v. New Jersey Transit Corp. =

- Supreme Court of the United States

Argued January 14, 2026 Decided March 4, 2026
- Full case name: Galette v. New Jersey Transit Corp.
- Docket no.: 24-1021
- Citations: 607 U.S. 509 (more)

Holding
- NJ Transit is not an arm of New Jersey and thus is not entitled to share in New Jersey's interstate sovereign immunity.

Court membership
- Chief Justice John Roberts Associate Justices Clarence Thomas · Samuel Alito; Sonia Sotomayor · Elena Kagan; Neil Gorsuch · Brett Kavanaugh; Amy Coney Barrett · Ketanji Brown Jackson

Case opinion
- Majority: Sotomayor, joined by unanimous

Galette v. New Jersey Transit Corp., 607 U.S. 509 (2026), was a United States Supreme Court case in which the court held that "NJ Transit is not an arm of New Jersey and thus is not entitled to share in New Jersey's interstate sovereign immunity."

== Background ==
In 1979, the New Jersey Legislature created the New Jersey Transit Corporation (NJ Transit) as a "body corporate and politic with corporate succession" and constituted it as an "instrumentality of the State exercising public and essential governmental functions" but "independent of any supervision or control" by the New Jersey Department of Transportation. New Jersey gave NJ Transit significant authority, including the power to make bylaws, sue and be sued, make contracts, acquire property, raise funds, own corporate entities, adopt regulations, and exercise eminent domain powers. NJ Transit's organic statute provides that "[n]o debt or liability of the corporation shall... constitute a debt [or] liability of the State," and that "[a]ll expenses... shall be payable from funds available to the corporation." NJ Transit is governed by a board of directors (Board). The New Jersey Governor may remove Board members and may veto Board actions; the Legislature may veto some eminent domain actions. NJ Transit is now the third largest provider of bus, rail, and light rail transit, operating within an area that includes New Jersey, New York City, and Philadelphia.

In 2017, Jeffrey Colt was struck by an NJ Transit bus in Midtown Manhattan; a year later, Cedric Galette was injured when an NJ Transit bus crashed into a car in which he was a passenger in Philadelphia. Both sued NJ Transit for negligence in their respective home state courts. NJ Transit moved to dismiss both lawsuits, arguing that it is an arm of New Jersey entitled to sovereign immunity. The highest court of New York held that NJ Transit is not an arm of New Jersey; the Pennsylvania Supreme Court held the opposite, concluding NJ Transit is an arm of New Jersey. The Supreme Court consolidated the cases and granted certiorari to resolve the conflict.

== Opinion of the court ==
The case was argued in the Supreme Court on January 14, 2026. On March 4, 2026, the Supreme Court issued a unanimous opinion, authored by Justice Sonia Sotomayor, affirming the judgment of the New York Court of Appeals and reversing the judgment of the Pennsylvania Supreme Court.
