= Ellingburg v. United States =

- Supreme Court of the United States

Argued October 14, 2025 Decided January 20, 2026
- Full case name: Holsey Ellingburg, Jr. v. United States
- Docket no.: 24-482
- Citations: 607 U.S. 163 (more) 146 S.Ct. 564, 223 L.Ed.2d 446
- Argument: Oral argument
- Opinion announcement: Opinion announcement
- Decision: Opinion

Holding
- Restitution ordered under the Mandatory Victims Restitution Act (MVRA) is criminal punishment subject to the constitution's Ex Post Facto Clause.

Court membership
- Chief Justice John Roberts Associate Justices Clarence Thomas · Samuel Alito; Sonia Sotomayor · Elena Kagan; Neil Gorsuch · Brett Kavanaugh; Amy Coney Barrett · Ketanji Brown Jackson

Case opinions
- Majority: Kavanaugh, joined by unanimous
- Concurrence: Thomas, joined by Gorsuch

Laws applied
- Mandatory Victims Restitution Act of 1996

Ellingburg v. United States, 607 U.S. 163 (2026), was a United States Supreme Court case in which the court held that restitution ordered under the Mandatory Victims Restitution Act of 1996 (MVRA) is criminal punishment subject to the constitution's Ex Post Facto Clause. Accordingly, the MVRA cannot be applied retroactively in a way that makes a defendant's sentence harsher than the law allowed at the time of the offense.

== Background ==
Holsey Ellingburg Jr. robbed a bank in 1995 and was later convicted. As part of his sentencing, he was ordered to pay $7,567.25 in restitution to the bank under the Mandatory Victims Restitution Act of 1996 (MVRA). After leaving prison in 2022, he challenged the restitution obligation ruling arguing that the government could not enforce the remaining payments because the law used to impose and collect it had been enacted after his crime occurred. He claimed that applying the newer law extended his punishment in violation of the Ex Post Facto Clause. Lower federal courts rejected his argument, reasoning that restitution was mainly meant to compensate victims and therefore was not punishment covered by the Constitution's restriction. The Supreme Court granted certiorari.

=== Mandatory Victims Restitution Act of 1996 ===
The Mandatory Victims Restitution Act requires federal courts to order defendants convicted of certain offenses to pay restitution to victims for losses directly caused by the offense. The statute applies primarily to crimes of violence and offenses against property, including crimes involving fraud or deceit, when an identifiable victim has suffered physical injury or financial loss. When the statute applies, courts must order restitution as part of the defendant's sentence. Restitution may include the return of stolen or damaged property or payment equal to the value of the property if it cannot be returned. In cases involving bodily injury, restitution may also include medical and rehabilitation costs, lost income, and related expenses, and in cases resulting in death it may include funeral expenses. Restitution orders are issued during sentencing and are enforced through federal procedures for the collection of criminal debts.

== Lower-court proceedings ==
After his release from prison in 2022, Holsey Ellingburg, Jr. asked a federal district court to end enforcement of his restitution order. He argued that applying the Mandatory Victims Restitution Act to his case violated the Constitution's Ex Post Facto Clause. Ellingburg said that because he committed the bank robbery in 1995, before the MVRA was enacted, the government could not apply the newer law's longer restitution liability period or its interest requirement to him. The district court rejected his motion, holding that the MVRA's provisions did not increase his punishment. The court reasoned that restitution mainly serves to compensate victims rather than punish the defendant, and therefore applying the newer law was allowed.

Ellingburg appealed to the United States Court of Appeals for the Eighth Circuit. The court affirmed the district court's decision. The Eighth Circuit relied on its earlier precedent holding that criminal restitution is not punishment for purposes of the Ex Post Facto Clause. According to that precedent, restitution operates as a civil remedy designed to reimburse victims for their losses rather than as a criminal penalty imposed on the defendant. Because of this, the court concluded that applying the MVRA's expanded restitution rules to Ellingburg did not violate the Constitution.

Two judges on the three judge panel wrote a concurring opinion questioning the circuit's precedent and suggesting that restitution imposed as part of a criminal sentence looks much like punishment. However, they explained that the panel was required to follow existing circuit precedent unless it was overturned by the full court or by the Supreme Court. The Eighth Circuit later declined to rehear the case en banc. Ellingburg then filed a petition for certiorari asking the Supreme Court of the United States to review the case, and the Court agreed to hear it.

== Oral arguments ==
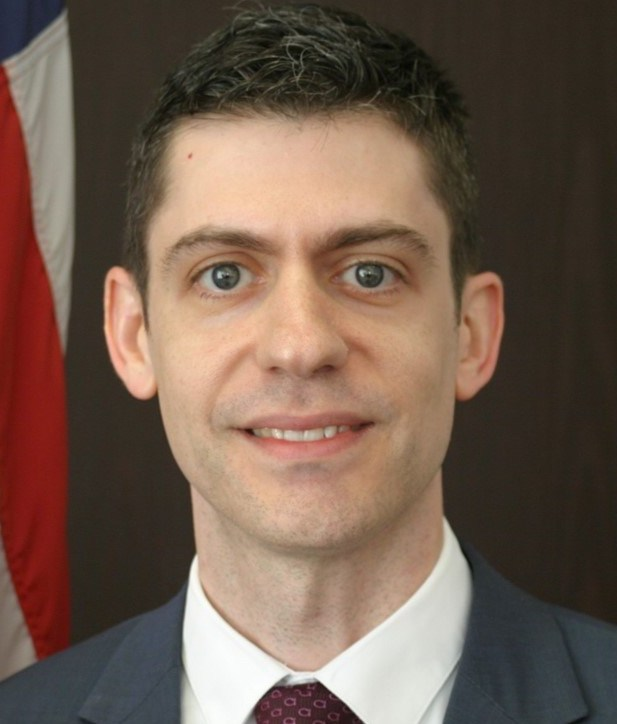
John F. Bash served as amicus curiae to defend the judgment of the United States Court of Appeals for the Eighth Circuit.

Oral argument in Ellingburg v. United States was held on October 14, 2025 before the Supreme Court of the United States. The petitioner, Holsey Ellingburg Jr., was represented by attorney Amy M. Saharia. The United States was represented by Ashley Robertson of the Office of the Solicitor General, who argued in support of vacating the lower court's judgment. The Court also appointed attorney John F. Bash as amicus curiae to defend the judgment of the United States Court of Appeals for the Eighth Circuit.

Counsel for Ellingburg argued that restitution imposed under the Mandatory Victims Restitution Act functions as criminal punishment and therefore cannot be retroactively extended without violating the Constitution's Ex Post Facto Clause. She contended that restitution is imposed as part of a criminal sentence, enforced by the government, and accompanied by significant legal consequences, making it punitive in nature.

Representing the United States, Robertson agreed that the lower court's judgment should be vacated and argued that restitution under the statute should be treated as criminal punishment for purposes of the Ex Post Facto Clause. She emphasized that restitution is imposed during sentencing and enforced through the federal criminal justice system.

John F. Bash, appearing as court-appointed amicus, defended the judgment below and argued that restitution under the statute primarily serves a compensatory function. He maintained that restitution is designed to reimburse victims for losses caused by criminal conduct rather than to punish the defendant, and therefore should not be treated as punishment for ex post facto purposes.

During the argument, several justices questioned the parties about how restitution differs from other monetary penalties imposed in criminal cases and whether its placement within the federal sentencing framework indicates a punitive character. Members of the Court also examined how restitution is enforced and whether its practical consequences resemble those of criminal punishment. The discussion focused on whether restitution should be classified as punishment for constitutional purposes and what implications that classification would have for the retroactive application of restitution statutes.

== Opinion of the court ==
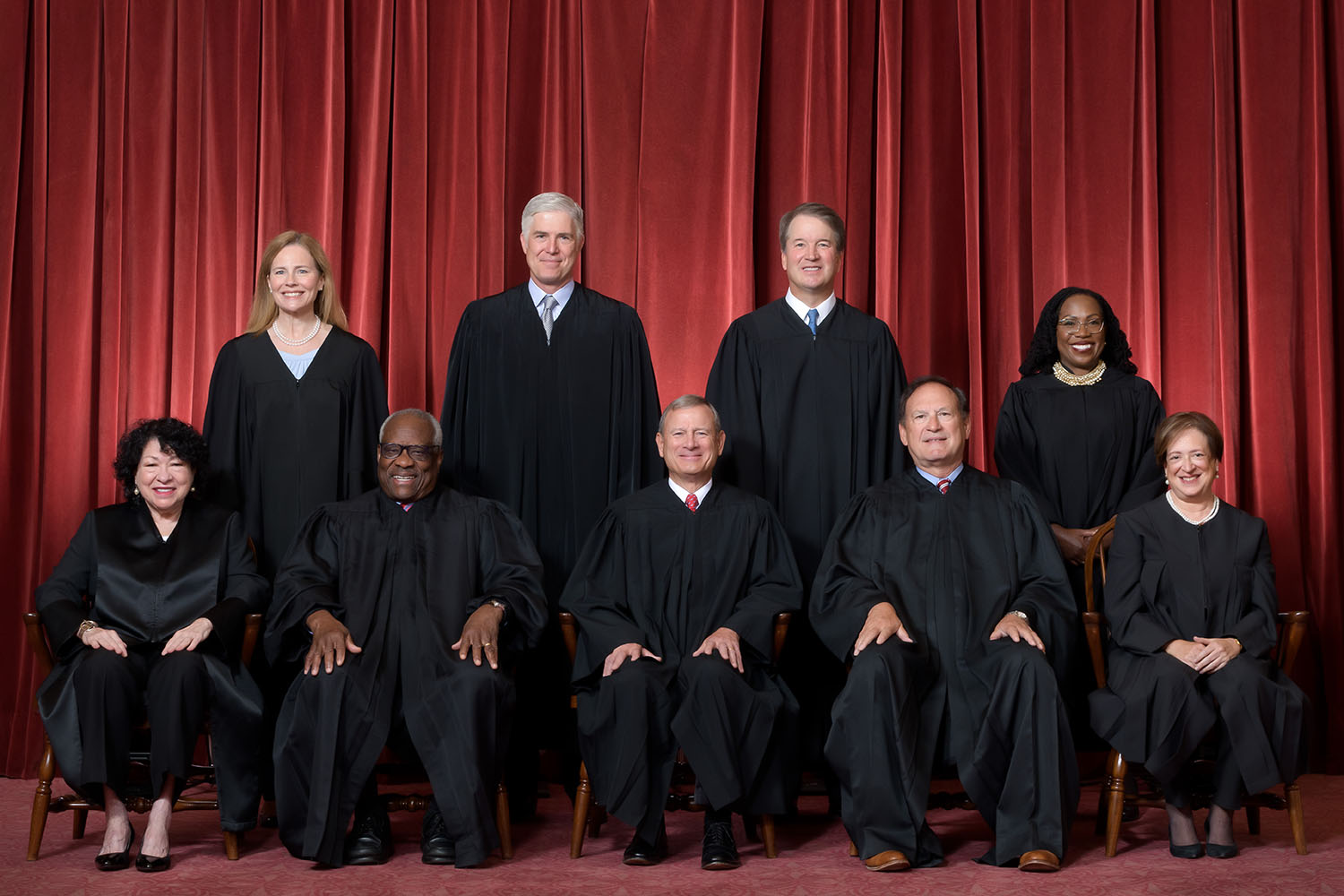
The Roberts Court at the time of the ruling

The Supreme Court issued an opinion on January 20, 2026. Writing for a unanimous Court, Justice Brett Kavanaugh announced that restitution under the MVRA functions as part of a criminal sentence rather than a civil payment. The court pointed out that restitution is imposed only after a criminal conviction, ordered during sentencing alongside penalties such as imprisonment or fines, and enforced by the government as part of a criminal prosecution. Although restitution also helps compensate victims, the Court concluded that its legal structure shows Congress intended it to punish offenders as well. Because restitution is punishment, constitutional protections against retroactive criminal penalties apply. Justice Clarence Thomas filed a concurring opinion, joined by Justice Neil Gorsuch, arguing that the court should eventually return to an earlier historical understanding of the Ex Post Facto Clause focused on whether a law imposes a coercive penalty for a public wrong.
