= Hain Celestial Group, Inc. v. Palmquist =

- Supreme Court of the United States

Argued November 4, 2025 Decided February 24, 2026
- Full case name: Hain Celestial Group, Inc. et al. v. Palmquist, Individually and as next friend of E.P., a minor, et al.
- Docket no.: 24-724
- Citations: 607 U.S. 421 (more)
- Argument: Oral argument
- Decision: Opinion

Case history
- Prior: United States Court of Appeals for the Fifth Circuit, No. 23-40197 (May 28, 2024); United States District Court for the Southern District of Texas, No. 3:21-CV-90 (February 17, 2023)

Questions presented
- Whether a district court's final judgment as to completely diverse parties must be vacated when an appellate court later determines that it erred by dismissing a non-diverse party at the time of removal.

Holding
- The erroneous dismissal of a non-diverse party after a case has been removed to federal court does not permit the federal court to exercise diversity jurisdiction over the case; such a case must be returned to state court.

Court membership
- Chief Justice John Roberts Associate Justices Clarence Thomas · Samuel Alito; Sonia Sotomayor · Elena Kagan; Neil Gorsuch · Brett Kavanaugh; Amy Coney Barrett · Ketanji Brown Jackson

Case opinions
- Majority: Sotomayor, joined by unanimous
- Concurrence: Thomas

Hain Celestial Group, Inc. v. Palmquist, 607 U.S. 421 (2026), was a United States Supreme Court case in which the court held that, when a federal court cannot cure a jurisdictional defect in a case that is removed from state to federal court, the federal court's decision must be vacated and returned to state court. Particularly, the federal court in this case dismissed a party in an attempt to exercise diversity jurisdiction, but the dismissal was erroneous. Thus, the Supreme Court invalidated the federal court's determinations and returned the case to state court.

== Background ==
Sarah and Grant Palmquist purchased baby food from Whole Foods Market that was made by Hain Celestial Group, Inc. They fed their son, E.P. (born in 2014), with the food. Several years later, E.P. "began exhibiting serious developmental disorders and was diagnosed with a range of physical and mental conditions." Some medical professionals identified metal poisoning as the likely cause of the problems. The Palmquists sued Hain and Whole Foods in Texas state court, alleging various state-law claims.

Hain removed the case to federal court. However, because Whole Foods is headquartered in Texas, it is considered a citizen of that state for purposes of jurisdiction. Under federal law, complete diversity of citizenship is required for a district court to have jurisdiction under 28 U.S.C. §1332. Hain argued that Whole Foods had been improperly joined to the case and should be dismissed. The District Court agreed with Hain, dismissed Whole Foods from the case, and denied the Palmquist's motion to remand the case to state court.

After trial in federal court, the District Judge granted Hain's motion for judgment as a matter of law. The Palmquists appealed to the Fifth Circuit and the court reversed the lower court's ruling on joinder of Whole Foods as a party. In addition, because the dismissal of Whole Foods had been in error, there was no longer the required complete diversity of parties. Thus, the Court of Appeals ruled that the judgment should be vacated.

Hain and Whole Foods filed a petition for certiorari, asking the Supreme Court to overrule the Fifth Circuit on the issue of vacating the District Court's judgment.

== Opinion of the court ==
Writing for a unanimous Court, Justice Sonia Sotomayor held that when a court of appeals finds that the district court lacked jurisdiction when a case was filed or removed to federal court, any judgment on the merits must be vacated. The only exception is for cases in which the district court corrects the problem with jurisdiction before final judgment.

Because Whole Foods "was only temporarily and erroneously removed from the case," the Court held, the Fifth Circuit's holding restored them to the case, and this "meant that the defect [in jurisdiction] 'lingered through judgment.'" Sotomayor also concluded that to rule for Hain, agreeing that the erroneous ruling on joinder was irrelevant, would allow a district court to "create jurisdiction through its own mistakes" and that is something the Supreme Court has never held.

Finally, the Court declined to adopt Hain's additional argument that Whole Foods should be dismissed pursuant to Rule 21 of the Federal Rules of Civil Procedure, which permits a court to “to dismiss a dispensable non-diverse party.” Sotomayor wrote that Hain could point to "no cases in which a court used Rule 21, over the plaintiff’s consistent objections, to dismiss a properly joined defendant to preserve jurisdiction over an incorrectly removed case that never should have been in federal court."
