= Berk v. Choy =

Harold R. Berk v. Wilson C. Choy, et al.
- Supreme Court of the United States

Argued October 6, 2025 Decided January 20, 2026
- Full case name: Harold R. Berk v. Wilson C. Choy, M.D. and Beebe Medical Center, Inc.
- Docket no.: 24-440
- Citations: 607 U.S. 187 (more)
- Argument: Oral argument
- Opinion announcement: Opinion announcement
- Decision: Opinion

Case history
- Prior: Dismissed ( D. Del. 2022) No. 1-22-cv-01506; Affirmed, (3rd Cir. 2024); certiorari granted (March 10, 2025)

Holding
- A state law requiring an affidavit of merit to be filed with a complaint is unenforceable in federal court because it conflicts with Rule 8 of the Federal Rules of Civil Procedure.

Court membership
- Chief Justice John Roberts Associate Justices Clarence Thomas · Samuel Alito; Sonia Sotomayor · Elena Kagan; Neil Gorsuch · Brett Kavanaugh; Amy Coney Barrett · Ketanji Brown Jackson

Case opinions
- Majority: Barrett, joined by Roberts, Thomas, Alito, Sotomayor, Kagan, Gorsuch, and Kavanaugh
- Concurrence: Jackson

Laws applied
- Federal Rules of Civil Procedure 8; 28 U.S.C. § 2072 (Rules Enabling Act); Del. Code, Tit. 18, § 6853

Berk v. Choy, 607 U.S. 187 (2026), is a United States Supreme Court case in which the court held that a state law requiring an affidavit of merit to be filed with a complaint is unenforceable in federal court because it conflicts with Rule 8 of the Federal Rules of Civil Procedure. In this case, it was Delaware's statute requiring plaintiffs in medical malpractice cases to file an affidavit that triggered the controversy.

== Background ==
Delaware passed a law stating that a medical negligence complaint may not be filed in Delaware courts without an affidavit of merit ("AoM"). The AoM needs to be signed by a doctor, who attests that he or she reasonably thinks that the plaintiff's case has merit as to each defendant.

This law would impact Harold Berk. While in Delaware, he fell out of bed, injuring his ankle. He was taken to Beebe Medical Center where he was treated by Dr. Choy. Dr. Choy decided to try a protective boot. While medical staff tried to fit Berk's foot into the boot, complications arose.

Being a citizen of Florida, Berk sued Choy and two other defendants for his injuries, in the District of Delaware, invoking the court's diversity jurisdiction, and applying Delaware law. On Berk's motion, the court gave him 60 days to comply with the AoM requirement. After Berk was unable to find a doctor willing to submit an AoM for him, he submitted his medical records instead. The defendants brought a motion to show cause, which procedure was not included in the Federal Rules, but was part of the Delaware procedures. The judge inspected the "AoM," found it lacking, and dismissed Berk's lawsuit, over his claim that the AoM was not required in federal court. Berk appealed. The Third Circuit affirmed in an unpublished opinion, finding no conflict between the state and federal laws. The Supreme Court granted the petitioner's writ of certiorari to resolve the circuit split regarding the applicability of AoM requirements in federal courts.

== Applicable Legal Principles ==
When federal courts sit in diversity, they respect the principles of federalism. The court applies federal procedural law and state substantive law. When there's a question of whether to apply state law or federal law, the Erie doctrine governs. Under this test, the court asks whether the state law is outcome determinative, then whether applying the federal law would violate the twin aims of Erie: discouragement of forum shopping and the absence of inequitable applications of the law.

On the other hand, a District Court applies the Federal Rules of Civil Procedure, and displaces any state law that "answers the same question" as a federal rule, unless the federal rule in question violates the Rules Enabling Act. This case would turn on which of these two interpretations of the law governed, or, in other words, whether the Delaware law conflicted directly with a federal rule of civil procedure.

== Supreme Court ==
The Supreme Court reversed and remanded. In a majority opinion written by Associate Justice Amy Coney Barrett, the Supreme Court found that the Delaware AoM requirement answered the same question as Rule 8. The question forming the conflict was "What must be filed with the complaint?" Rule 8 answered the question by requiring only three elements of notice pleading. Although Rule 8 does not explicitly state that a short and plain statement is both necessary and sufficient, it clearly does so implicitly. Barrett further held that the Federal Rule did not violate the Rules Enabling Act because the rule only involved the mode of enforcing rights, not the substance of those rights.

=== Concurrence ===
Concurring in the judgment, Associate Justice Ketanji Brown Jackson opined that the conflicts between the state law and the Federal Rules of Civil Procedure were with rules 3 and 12, not rule 8. The Delaware statute required the Prothonotary (clerk) not to docket the complaint without the AoM. This violated Rule 3, which states that a lawsuit commences when a complaint is filed.
