= United States Postal Service v. Konan =

- Supreme Court of the United States

Argued October 8, 2025 Decided February 24, 2026
- Full case name: United States Postal Service, et al. v. Lebene Konan
- Docket no.: 24-351
- Citations: 607 U.S. 391 (more)

Questions presented
- Whether a plaintiff's claim that she and her tenants did not receive mail because Postal Service employees intentionally did not deliver it to a designated address arises out of "the loss" or "miscarriage" of letters or postal matter. 28 U.S.C. 2680(b).

Holding
- The United States Postal Service cannot be sued for failure to deliver the mail even when postal employees intentionally and maliciously refuse to deliver the mail.

Court membership
- Chief Justice John Roberts Associate Justices Clarence Thomas · Samuel Alito; Sonia Sotomayor · Elena Kagan; Neil Gorsuch · Brett Kavanaugh; Amy Coney Barrett · Ketanji Brown Jackson

Case opinions
- Majority: Thomas, joined by Roberts, Alito, Kavanaugh, Barrett
- Dissent: Sotomayor, joined by Kagan, Gorsuch, Jackson

Laws applied
- Federal Tort Claims Act

United States Postal Service v. Konan, 607 U.S. 391 (2026), was a United States Supreme Court case in which the court held that the United States Postal Service is immune to suits for money damages for failure to deliver the mail even when postal employees intentionally and maliciously refuse to deliver the mail.

== Background ==
Lebene Konan and the local post office in Euless, Texas, had an extended dispute concerning mail delivery to two rental properties owned by Konan. Konan alleged that, among other things, United States Postal Service employees intentionally withheld mail addressed to her and her tenants and otherwise interfered with the mail's delivery. Konan believed the employees were racially discriminating against her because they did not believe that a Black woman could own multiple properties. Konan filed dozens of complaints over various obstructions to getting her mail delivered, such as changing the keys to her mailbox without her consent while demanding that she prove that she was the owner and marking the parcels as "Return to Sender".

After administrative complaints proved unsuccessful, Konan sued the United States in federal district court, bringing various state-law tort claims alleging that the United States Postal Service intentionally and wrongfully withheld her mail. The District Court dismissed Konan's complaint pursuant to the Federal Tort Claims Act's "postal exception", under which the United States government retains sovereign immunity for all claims "arising out of the loss, miscarriage, or negligent transmission of letters or postal matter". This is codified in 28 U.S.C. § 2680(b).. The District Court concluded that the United States enjoys sovereign immunity from Konan's claims because they all relate to personal or financial harms arising from nondelivery of mail. The District Court further held that the postal exception is not limited to merely negligent failure to properly carry the mail.

The Fifth Circuit Court of Appeals reversed, holding that the terms "loss", "miscarriage", and "negligent transmission" do not encompass the intentional act of not delivering the mail at all. In contrast, the First and Second Circuits had interpreted the postal exception to apply to suits even when they arose from harms caused by intentional misconduct. The Supreme Court granted certiorari to resolve the circuit split.

== Opinion of the court ==
In an opinion authored by Justice Clarence Thomas and issued on February 24, 2026, the Supreme Court held that the United States retains sovereign immunity for claims arising out of the intentional nondelivery of mail. The majority examined the common usage of the terms "miscarriage" and "loss" and concluded that in 1946, when Congress passed the FTCA's postal exception, neither term carried a meaning limited to negligent activities. The majority cited examples newspapers and other sources from around 1946 referring to the "miscarriage" or "loss" of mail in contexts that included or contemplated intentional conduct. The majority also rejected Konan's argument that a "miscarriage" required delivery to the wrong address, similarly citing 1940s sources that labeled any failure to deliver on time or at all a "miscarriage".

The majority also argued that postal exception's purpose – to prevent endless litigation related to delivery of the mail – was consistent with the majority's reading of the text.

Justice Sonia Sotomayor wrote a dissenting opinion, joined by Justices Kagan, Gorsuch, and Jackson, stating that she would have upheld the circuit court. The postal exception to the waiver of sovereign immunity, she argued, was significantly narrower than other exceptions to the waiver. Prior decisions had already held that the Postal Service could be liable for money damages in vehicular accidents while delivering mail and slip-and-fall cases related to package placement, and she would have recognized intentional acts as outside the scope of the postal exception.
