= Cox Communications, Inc. v. Sony Music Entertainment =

Cox Communications v. Sony Music
- Supreme Court of the United States

Argued December 1, 2025 Decided March 25, 2026
- Full case name: Cox Communications, Inc. et al. v. Sony Music Entertainment et al.
- Docket no.: 24-171
- Citations: 607 U.S. ___ (more)
- Argument: Oral argument
- Decision: Opinion

Questions presented
- 1. Whether an ISP that continues to provide internet access to particular subscribers, after being notified that those subscribers' accounts have been used to commit acts of copyright infringement, is contributorily liable for future copyright infringement on those accounts.; 2. Whether a contributory copyright infringer "willfully" violates the Copyright Act under 17 U.S.C. 504(c)(2) when it acts with knowledge that the direct infringer's actions are unlawful but does not know that its own conduct is unlawful.

Holding
- The provider of a service is contributorily liable for a user's infringement only if it intended that the provided service be used for infringement, which can be shown only if the party induced the infringement or the provided service is tailored to that infringement.

Court membership
- Chief Justice John Roberts Associate Justices Clarence Thomas · Samuel Alito; Sonia Sotomayor · Elena Kagan; Neil Gorsuch · Brett Kavanaugh; Amy Coney Barrett · Ketanji Brown Jackson

Case opinions
- Majority: Thomas, joined by Roberts, Alito, Kagan, Gorsuch, Kavanaugh, Barrett
- Concurrence: Sotomayor (in judgment), joined by Jackson

Cox Communications, Inc. v. Sony Music Entertainment, 146 S.Ct. 959 (2026), was a United States Supreme Court case regarding the liability of an internet service provider (ISP) when its subscribers engage in copyright infringement.

Cox Communications, an ISP, was sued by multiple music companies for lax enforcement against its paying subscribers who engaged in sharing the companies' copyrighted music, arguing that Cox financially benefited from the actions of those users. A jury at the district court level found Cox to be liable for contributory and vicarious copyright infringement. On appeal to the Fourth Circuit, that court reversed the lower court decision on vicarious infringement, but held that Cox was still liable for contributory infringement, with Cox potentially owing at least $1 billion to the music companies. That ruling was appealed to the United States Supreme Court, which held in a 9-0 decision that Cox was not contributorily liable for the actions of its subscribers, reversing the circuit court decision.

== Background ==
Music piracy became a significant issue for the music industry with widespread adoption of the Internet. Home copying of copyrighted entertainment programs for personal use was supported by the 1984 Supreme Court ruling in Sony Corp. of America v. Universal City Studios, Inc. but with the assumption that the copying technology was used primarily by the user in the home, with no intention of making numerous illegal copies that could damage the marketplace for the original content. That precedent was partially readdressed with the advent of file sharing on the Internet, with services like Napster and Grokster being shut down by the courts because most or all of their users created copies that infringed on copyright and damaged the marketplaces for original music and movie content.

The Cox case was noteworthy in that the Supreme Court addressed the allegedly copyright infringement liability of an Internet service provider (ISP), as opposed to individual users or the websites and platforms that they used. Holding an ISP responsible for the actions of its subscribers is difficult due to the anonymity which the Internet Protocol (IP) system allows, particularly with peer-to-peer sharing clients; despite the fact that millions of ISP customers allegedly engage in infringing activity. To help fight such copyright infringement at this scale, a clause of the Digital Millennium Copyright Act (DMCA) requires that ISPs first warn and then terminate the service of customers found to be repeat infringers, in exchange for reducing their liability from copyright infringement lawsuits. Music publishers have used the DMCA to press ISPs to take action when they find such repeat infringers.

== Lower court proceedings ==
Most of the major ISPs voluntarily joined the Copyright Alert System to allow music distributors to notify the ISP when they discovered a repeat infringer, allowing the ISP then to take action. Cox Communications refused to join this system, but did have a takedown policy in place by 2014. BMG Rights Management and Round Hill Music sued Cox anyway, however, claiming that its policy was too lax and that Cox did not enforce it strongly enough, as it allowed repeat infringers who had their service terminated to reapply at a later date. A jury at the District Court for the Eastern District of Virginia ruled against Cox in 2015, finding the company liable for the subscribers' piracy and requiring it to pay $25 million. Cox appealed to the Fourth Circuit, where the court in 2018 affirmed that Cox's repeat infringer policy failed to meet the standards expected by the DMCA, but overturned the verdict due to faulty jury instructions, remanding the case (in part) back to the lower court. Cox, BMG, and Round Hill settled for an undisclosed sum before the case was reheard in lower court.

Other music publishers had been watching the BMG case, anticipating that if the verdict was upheld, they would also seek damages from Cox. Prior to the BMG settlement in 2018, Sony Music, EMI, Warner Music Group, and Universal Music led several other music labels in suing Cox for damages over $1 billion, accusing the ISP of ignoring thousands of warnings on repeat infringers and liable for the piracy of over 10,000 songs. On remand, the jury in the Eastern District of Virginia found Cox liable for willful copyright infringement by its customers, and awarded the music labels $1 billion in damages.

Cox again appealed to the Fourth Circuit. The Electronic Frontier Foundation, Center for Democracy and Technology, American Library Association, Association of College and Research Libraries and Public Knowledge filed a amicus curiae brief urging the circuit court to overturn the district court verdict. In February 2024, the Fourth Circuit overturned the verdict, affirming that Cox was liable for willful contributory infringement due to its lax takedown policies, but not for vicarious infringement, in which the entity knowingly profits from the copyright infringement of its subscribers that had been the basis of the music label's monetary damages. The Fourth Circuit vacated the $1 billion award and remanded the case to be heard by a second jury to reassess the damages.

== Supreme Court ruling ==
Cox petitioned to the Supreme Court to challenge the Fourth Circuit's decision that found it liable for contributory infringement, asserting that as an ISP, it is not the "Internet police", and should not be required to punish subscribers based on automatic takedown notices targeting a single IP address. Sony Music Entertainment took over from BMG as lead plaintiff. The various music companies separately petitioned the Court to review the decision related to vicarious infringement by Cox. The Supreme Court granted certiorari for Cox's appeal request in June 2025 but denied the music label's petition, limiting the case to the questions Cox raised on contributory infringement.

Amicus briefs supporting Cox were submitted by free speech groups like the American Civil Liberties Union, as well as major technology companies like Google and X Corp., while the music label's position was supported by briefs from entertainment industry groups like the Motion Picture Association. Cox's position was also supported by the U.S. Solicitor General's office, arguing that the labels had not met the standard to demonstrate that Cox was liable for copyright infringement.

Oral arguments were held December 1, 2025. Court journalists reported that the Justices from both ends of the political spectrum were skeptical of arguments from both Cox and the music labels, with Sonia Sotomayor saying "We are being put to two extremes here, how do we announce a rule that deals with those two extremes?" The justices questioned whether Cox's policy was too laissez-faire and whether this influenced the jury in the original district court proceeding. The Justices also opined that some of the proposed remedies from the music labels were too strict, such as slowing Internet speeds at colleges due to the number of repeat infringers found there, of which Justice Samuel Alito said "I just don't see how it's workable at all". Journalists noted that the discussions among the Justices appeared to favor Cox, following from the high court's previous rulings in Gonzalez v. Google and Twitter v. Taamneh which favored liability protection for ISPs from the actions of their subscribers. Justice Neil Gorsuch said the court would need to use a "flag of caution in expanding [the definition of contributory liability] too broadly" due to lack of congressional action.

The Court issued its decision on March 25, 2026, with all nine justices agreeing in favor of Cox that it was not liable for contributory infringement, reversing the Fourth Circuit's decision and remanding the case. Justice Clarence Thomas wrote for the majority, joined by all but Justices Sonia Sotomayor and Ketanji Brown Jackson. Thomas said "Under our precedents, a company is not liable as a copyright infringer for merely providing a service to the general public with knowledge that it will be used by some to infringe copyrights."

Sotomayor wrote a concurring opinion, joined by Jackson, agreeing with the outcome but saying that "The majority's artificial limiting of secondary liability is supported by neither precedent nor statute." Sotomayor also suggested the law of aiding and abetting, which could have worked in favor of the music companies, but they could not prove that Cox knowingly helped its subscribers commit copyright infringement. Sotomayor called this a fatal "informational gap" since the plaintiffs only told Cox about the connections in a location that violated the copyrights, but not who actually violated the law among the subscribers. Sotomayor noted that Cox might be indifferent to the music industry's concerns, but concluded that "Mere indifference, however, is not enough for aiding and abetting liability to attach."

== Impact ==
Following the decision, the Supreme Court granted certiorari to an appeal from the Fifth Circuit in Grande Communications v. UMG Recordings, and immediately vacated the circuit court's ruling against the ISP Grande Communications for contributory infringement. That case was sent back to the circuit court with instructions to review its previous ruling per the outcome of the Cox case.

Ars Technica concluded that the Cox ruling at the Supreme Court would "doom other copyright lawsuits," adding that big tech and AI companies have begun to cite Cox in copyright lawsuits that have been filed against them. In particular, Nvidia cited Cox in its responses to lawsuits claiming its involvement in the use of copyrighted material to train artificial intelligence tools. Since the Supreme Court held that Cox did not intend to enable infringement by its subscribers, Nvidia argued that its platform "cannot be deemed 'tailored to infringement' under Cox." Citing Cox, Google and Meta also claimed that similar lawsuits they were facing from book publishers, due to use of copyrighted books for AI training, should be tossed out of court.
