= Coney Island Auto Parts, Inc. v. Burton =

2026 U.S. Supreme Court case

- Supreme Court of the United States

Argued November 4, 2025 Decided January 20, 2026
- Full case name: Coney Island Auto Parts Unlimited, Inc. v. Jeanne Ann Burton, Chapter 7 Trustee for Vista-Pro Automotive, LLC
- Docket no.: 24-808
- Citations: 607 U.S. 155 (more)
- Argument: Oral argument
- Decision: Opinion

Case history
- Prior: Burton v. Coney Island Auto Parts Unlimited, Inc. (In re Vista-Pro Automotive, LLC), 109 F.4th 438 (6th Cir. 2024).

Questions presented
- Whether Federal Rule of Civil Procedure 60(c)(1)’s requirement that parties make Rule 60(b) motions within a “reasonable time” applies to a motion seeking relief from an allegedly void judgment under Rule 60(b)(4).

Holding
- Rule 60(c)(1)’s reasonable-time limit applies to a motion alleging that a judgment is void under Rule 60(b)(4).

Court membership
- Chief Justice John Roberts Associate Justices Clarence Thomas · Samuel Alito; Sonia Sotomayor · Elena Kagan; Neil Gorsuch · Brett Kavanaugh; Amy Coney Barrett · Ketanji Brown Jackson

Case opinions
- Majority: Alito, joined by Roberts, Thomas, Kagan, Gorsuch, Kavanaugh, Barrett, Jackson
- Concurrence: Sotomayor (in judgment)

Laws applied
- Fed. R. Civ. P. 60(b)(4), 60(c)(1)

Coney Island Auto Parts, Inc. v. Burton, 607 U.S. 155 (2026), was a case before the Supreme Court of the United States concerning whether the "reasonable time" requirement in Federal Rule of Civil Procedure 60(c)(1) limits when a party may move under Rule 60(b)(4) to set aside a default judgment as void for lack of personal jurisdiction.

The dispute arose from an adversary proceeding in the bankruptcy of Vista-Pro Automotive, LLC, in which the bankruptcy court in the Middle District of Tennessee entered a default judgment against Coney Island Auto Parts Unlimited, Inc. (a New York corporation). After Coney Island sought to vacate that judgment several years later, lower courts denied the motion as untimely under Rule 60(c)(1).

The Supreme Court granted certiorari on June 6, 2025, and heard oral arguments on November 4, 2025. On January 20, 2026, the Court issued its decision unanimously affirming the Sixth Circuit's decision.

== Background ==
In November 2014, Vista-Pro Automotive, LLC, a Tennessee-based auto-parts manufacturer, entered bankruptcy proceedings in the United States Bankruptcy Court for the Middle District of Tennessee. During the Chapter 11 phase of the case, Vista-Pro filed adversary complaints against multiple entities that it alleged owed unpaid invoices, including Coney Island Auto Parts Unlimited, Inc.

In the adversary proceeding against Coney Island, Vista-Pro served the summons and complaint by first-class mail addressed to the corporation, without directing the mailing to the attention of an officer, a managing or general agent, or another authorized agent. Coney Island did not respond, and the bankruptcy court entered a default judgment in May 2015. (In its merits briefing to the Supreme Court, Coney Island stated that the judgment required payment of $48,696.21 plus a per diem amount of $7.00.)

The Vista-Pro bankruptcy later converted to a Chapter 7 liquidation, and Jeanne Ann Burton was appointed as trustee in 2016. The trustee sought to collect on the default judgment and, according to the Sixth Circuit, Coney Island had actual notice of the judgment no later than April 2016.

After years of collection efforts, the trustee registered the Tennessee judgment in New York and served a subpoena on Coney Island's bank. The bank placed a hold on Coney Island's account in February 2021. In October 2021, Coney Island filed a Rule 60(b)(4) motion in the Southern District of New York bankruptcy court seeking to vacate the Tennessee default judgment as void for lack of personal jurisdiction (arguing defective service). The New York bankruptcy court declined to intervene on comity grounds and directed Coney Island to seek relief in Tennessee. A district court affirmed in April 2022.

== Lower-court proceedings ==
In July 2022, Coney Island filed a Rule 60(b)(4) motion in the Middle District of Tennessee bankruptcy court seeking to set aside the 2015 default judgment as void for lack of personal jurisdiction. The bankruptcy court denied the motion as untimely, holding that Rule 60(c)(1) requires Rule 60(b)(4) motions to be filed "within a reasonable time." The district court affirmed, and Coney Island appealed to the Sixth Circuit.

In July 2024, the Sixth Circuit affirmed. The majority (Judge Joan Larsen) held that Rule 60(c)(1)'s text provides that all Rule 60(b) motions must be filed within a reasonable time, including motions under Rule 60(b)(4). Relying on circuit precedent (including United States v. Dailide), the court rejected Coney Island's argument that motions to vacate void judgments are categorically exempt from timeliness limits, and it concluded that the multi-year delay – given Coney Island's admitted notice by 2016 – was unreasonable. The court acknowledged that its approach was not the majority view in other courts of appeals, but stated it was bound by its precedent and by its reading of Rule 60(c)(1).

Judge David McKeague dissented, arguing that a judgment entered without personal jurisdiction is void and should not become enforceable merely because time has passed.

== Supreme Court ==
=== Certiorari and question presented ===
The Supreme Court granted certiorari on June 6, 2025. The Court framed the case as involving a disagreement among the courts of appeals about how Rule 60(c)(1)’s "reasonable time" requirement applies to motions under Rule 60(b)(4) that claim a judgment is void for lack of personal jurisdiction.

The question presented was:

Whether Federal Rule of Civil Procedure 60(c)(1) imposes any time limit to set aside a void default judgment for lack of personal jurisdiction.

The case was argued on November 4, 2025.

=== Arguments ===
Coney Island contended that a default judgment entered without personal jurisdiction was void "ab initio" and that such a "void" judgment could not be insulated from challenge by the passage of time. It argued that many courts treat void judgments as legal nullities for which equitable defenses and strict time limits have limited, if any, role and that allowing Rule 60(b)(4) challenges would not necessarily undermine orderly procedure because a plaintiff who lost a judgment on service or jurisdictional grounds could attempt to correct the defect and refile or re-serve where permitted.

Burton responded that Rule 60(c)(1) by its terms required that "a motion under Rule 60(b) must be made within a reasonable time" and that applying that requirement to Rule 60(b)(4) motions promoted finality and protected judgment creditors and third parties from disruption long after a case's conclusion. Burton also argued that unlimited time to challenge judgments would invite gamesmanship and risk prejudice from the loss of evidence and fading memories, and that timeliness rules could limit remedies without "curing" underlying legal defects.

=== Oral argument ===
At oral argument, the justices questioned whether allowing challenges to allegedly void judgments without any temporal limitation would be inconsistent with the Court’s broader approach to procedural deadlines and finality, particularly where a party had notice of the judgment and delayed seeking relief. SCOTUSblog reported that several justices explored the distinction between declaring a judgment "valid" and enforcing a rule that limits how long a party has to ask a court to reopen a final judgment. Counsel for Coney Island argued that a judgment void from the outset cannot be subject to a time bar and suggested that imposing a strict time limit would raise due process concerns. Counsel for Burton emphasized the text of Rule 60(c)(1) and argued that some lower-court decisions declining to enforce the “reasonable time” language do not align with modern textualist approaches to procedural rules.

=== Opinion of the Court ===
Responding to the petitioner's assertion that a “void judgment is a legal nullity,” Justice Alito wrote that the "argument cannot bear the weight that Coney Island and others have placed on it." Parties do not have unlimited time to "seek relief from an allegedly void judgment" and the "reasonable time" allowed under Rule 60 "may well be all that due process demands." The opinion acknowledged that "courts have granted relief from void judgments long after their entry," but held that the petitioner's contention regarding the practice was not so clear, because there has been "no historical consensus that a party could request such relief at any time" (emphasis in original).

== Significance ==
The case is expected to clarify whether and how Rule 60(c)(1)’s "reasonable time" requirement constrains Rule 60(b)(4) motions asserting that a judgment is void for lack of personal jurisdiction, a question that has divided lower federal courts. The dispute has been described as highlighting tension between Rule 60's text and long-standing legal concepts treating void judgments as nullities without legal effect.

Because the underlying litigation arose in a bankruptcy adversary proceeding, the Court's ruling may affect how quickly judgment debtors must challenge alleged defects in service or personal jurisdiction in bankruptcy-related collection litigation, and how bankruptcy estates can rely on final judgments when distributing assets to creditors.
