= Olivier v. City of Brandon =

- Supreme Court of the United States

Argued December 3, 2025 Decided March 20, 2026
- Full case name: Gabriel Olivier v. City of Brandon, Mississippi
- Docket no.: 24-993
- Citations: 607 U.S. ___ (more)
- Argument: Oral argument
- Decision: Opinion

Holding
- A plaintiff can sue the government under Section 1983 to seek wholly prospective relief from a law that they believe is unconstitutional even though they cannot use Section 1983 to challenge a prior conviction.

Court membership
- Chief Justice John Roberts Associate Justices Clarence Thomas · Samuel Alito; Sonia Sotomayor · Elena Kagan; Neil Gorsuch · Brett Kavanaugh; Amy Coney Barrett · Ketanji Brown Jackson

Case opinion
- Majority: Kagan, joined by unanimous

Laws applied
- Section 1983

Olivier v. City of Brandon, 607 U.S. ____ (2026), was a United States Supreme Court case in which the court held that a plaintiff can sue the government under Section 1983 to seek wholly prospective relief from a law that they believe is unconstitutional even though they cannot use Section 1983 to challenge a prior conviction.

== Background ==
Gabriel Olivier was a street preacher in Mississippi who believed that sharing his religious views with fellow citizens was an important part of exercising his faith. His vocation sometimes took him to the sidewalks near an amphitheater in Brandon, Mississippi, where he could find sizable audiences attending events. In 2019, the city adopted an ordinance requiring all individuals or groups engaging in "protests" or "demonstrations," at around the time events were scheduled, to stay within a "designated protest area." In 2021, Olivier was arrested for violating that ordinance. He pleaded no contest in municipal court. The court imposed a $304 fine, one year of probation, and 10 days of imprisonment to be served only if he violated the ordinance during his probation. Olivier declined to appeal, paid the fine, and served no prison time. Because he still wanted to preach near the amphitheater, Olivier filed suit against the city in federal court under 42 U.S.C. §1983, alleging that the city ordinance violates the Free Speech Clause of the First Amendment by consigning him and other speakers to the amphitheater's protest area. The complaint sought, as a remedy, a declaration that the ordinance infringed the First Amendment and an injunction preventing city officials from enforcing the ordinance in the future. In other words, the relief requested was only prospective; Olivier sought neither the reversal of, nor compensation for, his prior conviction.

The parties contested in the lower courts whether the Supreme Court's decision in Heck v. Humphrey—which prohibits the use of §1983 to challenge the validity of a prior conviction or sentence to obtain release from custody or monetary damages—bars the suit from going forward. On the city's view of Heck, a person previously convicted of violating a statute could not challenge its constitutionality under §1983 because success in the suit would cast doubt on the prior conviction's correctness. On Olivier's contrary view, Heck did not apply when a plaintiff sought wholly prospective relief, rather than relief relating to the prior conviction. The federal District Court agreed with the city's understanding of Heck and found Olivier's suit barred. The Court of Appeals for the Fifth Circuit affirmed on the same reasoning.

The Supreme Court granted certiorari.

== Opinion of the court ==
The Supreme Court issued an opinion on March 20, 2026.
