= Watson v. Republican National Committee =

- Supreme Court of the United States

Argued March 23, 2026 Decided June 29, 2026
- Full case name: Michael Watson, Mississippi Secretary of State v. Republican National Committee, et al.
- Docket no.: 24-1260
- Citations: 609 U.S. ___ (more)
- Argument: Oral argument
- Decision: Opinion

Holding
- The federal election statutes do not prohibit state election officials from counting a mail-in ballot that arrives after Election Day when the ballot was postmarked by that date.

Court membership
- Chief Justice John Roberts Associate Justices Clarence Thomas · Samuel Alito; Sonia Sotomayor · Elena Kagan; Neil Gorsuch · Brett Kavanaugh; Amy Coney Barrett · Ketanji Brown Jackson

Case opinions
- Majority: Barrett, joined by Roberts, Sotomayor, Kagan, Jackson
- Dissent: Alito, joined by Thomas, Gorsuch; Kavanaugh (except Parts II–C–2 and III)

Watson v. Republican National Committee is a 5–4 United States Supreme Court decision in which the court ruled that mail-in ballots cast and postmarked by Election Day can be counted if they are received after Election Day.

== Background ==
In January 2024, the Republican National Committee and Mississippi Republican Party filed a federal lawsuit seeking to enjoin the Mississippi secretary of state, the Harrison County circuit court clerk, and the Harrison County election commissioners from counting mail-in absentee ballots after Election Day. In February, the Libertarian Party of Mississippi filed a companion case. In July 2024, the U.S. District Court for the Southern District of Mississippi rejected their arguments, granted summary judgment in favor of the election officials, and dismissed the case. They promptly appealed.

In October 2024, the Fifth Circuit reversed in part and vacated in part the judgment, holding that federal election-day statutes require ballots for federal office to be both cast and received by Election Day, and therefore preempt Mississippi's law. In March 2025, the intervenor defendants-appellees' petition for rehearing en banc was denied by the circuit court. In June, Mississippi petitioned the Supreme Court for a writ of certiorari, and in November it was granted.

In June 2025 in a related case, the U.S. District Court for the District of Massachusetts held that nineteen states were likely to succeed on the merits that their post-election day receipt deadlines were consistent with the Election Day statutes and issued a preliminary injunction against enforcement of Executive Order 14248.

== Supreme Court ==
In a 5–4 decision written by Justice Amy Coney Barrett, the Supreme Court upheld that the federal election-day statutes do not preempt the Mississippi's law, ruling that federal statutes do not require mail-in ballots to arrive by Election Day. Chief Justice John Roberts and Justices Sotomayor, Kagan, and Jackson joined her opinion. In her opinion, Justice Barrett cited the Uniformed and Overseas Citizens Absentee Voting Act (UOCAVA) that "while federal law dictates when ballots must be cast, state law dictates when they must be received." Therefore affirming that "the election-day statutes do not set a deadline for ballot receipt, so they do not prevent Mississippi from counting ballots postmarked before election day yet received afterward."

Responding to the argument from the plaintiff and dissent about election fraud, such as ballot harvesters, Justice Barrett made a point that this case was not about the manner of ballot delivery, as the dissent also concedes that "the relevant statutes regulate 'only the timing of election processes, not their manner.'"

Justice Barrett also addressed the plaintiff's argument that Mississippi's law could increase an "appearance of fraud because election results may appear to flip after election day", but she gave a reminder that "last-minute flips are possible, because the election-day statutes set no deadline for counting ballots or certifying election results."

In his dissent, Alito wrote "It is undeniable that a prohibition on counting late-arriving ballots would provide an additional hurdle for bad actors seeking to stuff ballot boxes when early election results suggest a tight race. The majority incorrectly removes this safeguard from federal law."

== Reaction ==
Donald Trump, a longtime critic of mail-in voting, called the decision "a tremendous loss." Senate Minority Leader Chuck Schumer, D-N.Y., celebrated the high court’s ruling, saying in a statement that the justices "upheld this bedrock American principle: if you cast your ballot on time, your vote will count."

Justice Amy Coney Barrett received criticism from the conservatives for not siding with President Trump in her ruling. Republican Senator Eric Schmitt described her decision as "a shockingly wrong opinion." Several conservative commentators also criticized Justice Barrett. Josh Hammer complained how Justice Barrett was disappointing "in far too many high-profile cases", and Megyn Kelly criticized how Justice Barrett joined the "libs" justices while she was "supposed to be ours".

== See also ==
- Bost v. Illinois State Board of Elections
- Election subversion § United States
