= Urias-Orellana v. Bondi =

- Supreme Court of the United States

Argued December 1, 2025 Decided March 4, 2026
- Full case name: Urias-Orellana v. Bondi
- Docket no.: 24-777
- Citations: 607 U.S. 537 (more)

Holding
- When reviewing an immigration court's decision to deny asylum, a reviewing court must apply a substantial-evidence standard. Under that standard, to reverse an immigration court that has found that an asylum applicant was not fleeing persecution, the reviewing court must find that the applicant proved that they were persecuted with evidence that is so compelling that no reasonable factfinder could fail to find the requisite fear of persecution.

Court membership
- Chief Justice John Roberts Associate Justices Clarence Thomas · Samuel Alito; Sonia Sotomayor · Elena Kagan; Neil Gorsuch · Brett Kavanaugh; Amy Coney Barrett · Ketanji Brown Jackson

Case opinion
- Majority: Jackson, joined by unanimous

Laws applied
- Immigration and Nationality Act

Urias-Orellana v. Bondi, 607 U.S. 537 (2026), was a United States Supreme Court case in which the court held that, when reviewing an immigration court's decision to deny asylum, a reviewing court must apply a substantial-evidence standard. Under that standard, to reverse an immigration court that has found that an asylum applicant was not fleeing persecution, the reviewing court must find that the applicant proved that they were persecuted with evidence that is so compelling that no reasonable factfinder could fail to find the requisite fear of persecution.

== Background ==
In 2021, Douglas Humberto Urias-Orellana, his wife Sayra Iliana Gamez-Mejia, and their minor child (collectively, Urias-Orellana) traveled from El Salvador to the United States. They entered the latter without documentation. After being placed in deportation proceedings, Urias-Orellana applied for asylum. Under the Immigration and Nationality Act (INA), the federal government "may grant asylum" to a non-citizen if it "determines" that they are a "refugee". An asylum seeker qualifies as a "refugee" if they are "unable or unwilling to return" to their country of nationality "because of persecution or a well-founded fear of persecution on account of race, religion, nationality, membership in a particular social group, or political opinion."

In support of his family's applications for asylum, Urias-Orellana testified that he was being targeted by a hitman in El Salvador. The immigration judge found Urias-Orellana's testimony credible but concluded that it did not establish past persecution or a well-founded fear of future persecution under the INA. The immigration judge accordingly denied the petitioners' asylum applications and ordered their removal. The Board of Immigration Appeals (BIA) affirmed. On petition for review, the Court of Appeals for the First Circuit also affirmed, holding that, under the substantial-evidence standard of review discussed in INS v. Elias-Zacarias, the record did not compel a contrary finding.

The Supreme Court granted certiorari.

== Opinion of the court ==
The Supreme Court issued an opinion on March 4, 2026. The majority opinion was given by Ketanji Brown Jackson, and was unanimous.
