= Barrett v. United States (2026) =

- Supreme Court of the United States

Argued October 7, 2025 Decided January 14, 2026
- Full case name: Dwayne Barrett, Petitioner v. United States
- Docket no.: 24-5774
- Citations: 607 U.S. 128 (more)
- Argument: Oral argument
- Opinion announcement: Opinion announcement

Case history
- Prior: Defendant convicted and sentenced. United States v. Barrett, 12-cr-45 (S.D.N.Y. 2014).; Affirmed. 903 F.3d 166 (2d Cir. 2018).; Granted, vacated, and remanded, 139 S. Ct. 2774 (2019).; Vacated and remanded for resentencing, 937 F.3d 126 (2d Cir. 2019).; Defendant resentenced, 12-cr-45 (S.D.N.Y. 2021).; Affirmed in part and remanded in part. 102 F.4th 60 (2d Cir. 2024).; Cert. granted, 604 U.S. ___ (2025).

Questions presented
- Whether the Double Jeopardy Clause permits two sentences for an act that violates 18 U.S.C. § 924(c) and § 924(j), that is, whether a single act that violates both provisions may yield two convictions—one under each provision—or only one.

Holding
- Two separate convictions under both 18 U.S.C. § 924(c)(1)(a)(i) and § 924(j) for a single act are not permitted because Congress did not intend that result.

Court membership
- Chief Justice John Roberts Associate Justices Clarence Thomas · Samuel Alito; Sonia Sotomayor · Elena Kagan; Neil Gorsuch · Brett Kavanaugh; Amy Coney Barrett · Ketanji Brown Jackson

Case opinions
- Majority: Jackson (parts I through IV–B)
- Plurality: Jackson (part IV–C), joined by Roberts, Sotomayor, Kagan
- Concurrence: Gorsuch

Laws applied
- Blockburger v. United States

Barrett v. United States 607 U.S. 128 (2026) is a United States Supreme Court case in which the Court held that two separate convictions under both 18 U.S.C. § 924(c)(1)(a)(i) and § 924(j) for a single act was not intended by Congress.

== Background ==
=== Factual background ===
In 2011 and 2012, Dwayne Barrett acted as the getaway driver of a robbery crew. In December 2011, Barrett and his two accomplices, Jermaine Dore and Taijay Todd, planned to rob a van carrying $10,000 in proceeds from the sale of untaxed cigarettes. While Barrett remained in the car, Dore and Todd forced the driver and passenger of the van from the vehicle at gunpoint, got in the vehicle, and then drove off. Unbeknownst to Barrett's accomplices, a third man, Gamar Dafalla, remained in the back of the van. After they drove off, Dafalla threw a bag containing the vast majority of the $10,000 out the van to his compatriots. Upon realizing what Dafalla had done, Dore shot and killed him.

=== Legal background ===
For his role in the robbery, Barrett was charged in the Southern District of New York with (among other things) conspiracy to commit Hobbs Act Robbery (Count One), discharging a firearm in relation to Hobbs Act conspiracy (Count Two), aiding a robbery (Count Five), aiding the use of a discharged firearm (Count Six), and aiding the use of a firearm used to commit murder (Count Seven). Barrett was convicted in March 2013, and sentenced to 90 years in prison. The Second Circuit affirmed, but Barrett's Count Two conviction would later be vacated by the Supreme Court in light of United States v. Davis (2019).

Section 924(c)(1)(A)(i) criminalizes the possession, use, or carrying of a firearm to advance a crime of violence or a drug-trafficking offense. Section 924(j) criminalizes when someone, "in the course of a violation of subsection (c), causes the death of a person through the use of a firearm."

At resentencing in 2021, Barrett was sentenced to fifty years in prison: twenty years on Counts One, Three, and Five to run concurrently to each other; and five and twenty-five years on Counts Four and Seven, respectively, to run consecutively to each other, and consecutively to the sentence imposed for Counts One, Three, and Five. For Count Six (stemming from the Dafalla murder), the district court imposed no sentence, arguing that his §924(c) offense is a lesser-included offense of the §924(j) conduct. On appeal, Barrett filed supplemental briefing in light of Lora v. United States, arguing that his §924(j) offense did not warrant consecutive sentencing. The Second Circuit agreed, but reversed the district court's finding that §924(c) and §924(j) could be punished with a single sentence. The Court found that the two are separate offenses that required separate sentences, despite one being a lesser-included offense contained within the other. The Circuit further held that such sentences would not violate the Double Jeopardy Clause. It then remanded to the district court for resentencing on Count Seven, followed by resentencing on Count Six.

== Supreme Court ==
On October 15, 2024, Barrett filed a petition for certiorari. In its brief in opposition, the United States recognized that it had "long taken the position that cumulative punishment under Section 924(c) and (j) for the same use of a firearm is not permitted," and that the Courts of Appeals are split on the issue, but nevertheless opposed review given the case's interlocutory posture. On March 3, 2025, the Supreme Court granted certiorari. On March 19, the Court appointed an amicus to defend the Second Circuit's opinion.

The case was decided on January 14, 2026, holding that only one conviction is permitted, as Congress did not clearly authorize cumulative convictions under both provisions for the same act.
