= Stuart Banner =

American legal historian

- Born: November 20, 1963 (age 62)
- Education: Yale University; Stanford Law School
- Occupations: Historian; Professor of Law
- Employers: University of California, Los Angeles; Washington University in St. Louis

Stuart Alan Banner (born November 20, 1963) is an American legal historian and the Norman Abrams Professor of Law at the UCLA School of Law. Banner also directs UCLA's Supreme Court Clinic, which offers students the opportunity to work on real cases before the U.S. Supreme Court.

== Education and early career ==
Banner received his B.A. from Yale University in 1985 and his J.D. from Stanford Law School in 1988, where he was an articles editor of the Stanford Law Review.

Following his graduation from law school, Banner clerked for Judge Alex Kozinski of the U.S. Court of Appeals for the Ninth Circuit and for Justice Sandra Day O'Connor of the U.S. Supreme Court.

== Academic career ==
Before joining the UCLA law faculty in 2001, Banner worked as an associate at Davis Polk & Wardwell in New York City, practiced law at the New York Office of the Appellate Defender, and taught at Washington University School of Law.

At UCLA, Banner teaches courses on property law, American legal thought, and the Supreme Court.

Banner is the recipient of fellowships from the National Endowment for the Humanities, the Fulbright Scholar Program, the John Simon Guggenheim Memorial Foundation, and the Woodrow Wilson International Center for Scholars.

A 2014 study found that Banner is the seventh most-cited legal scholar in the field of legal history.

== Publications ==
Banner's scholarship has been published in numerous law journals, including the Stanford Law Review, Harvard Law Review, Virginia Law Review, and The Journal of Legal Studies.

Banner has authored 11 books:

- The Most Powerful Court in the World: A History of the Supreme Court of the United States (Oxford University Press, 2024)
- The Decline of Natural Law: How American Lawyers Once Used Natural Law and Why They Stopped (Oxford University Press, 2021).
- Speculation: A History of the Fine Line between Gambling and Investing (Oxford University Press, 2016).
- The Baseball Trust: A History of Baseball's Antitrust Exemption (Oxford University Press, 2013).
- American Property: A History of How, Why, and What We Own (Harvard University Press, 2011).
- Who Owns the Sky? The Struggle to Control Airspace from the Wright Brothers On (Harvard University Press, 2008).
- Possessing the Pacific: Land, Settlers, and Indigenous People from Australia to Alaska (Harvard University Press, 2007).
- How the Indians Lost Their Land: Law and Power on the Frontier (Harvard University Press, 2005).
- The Death Penalty: An American History (Harvard University Press, 2002).
- Legal Systems in Conflict: Property and Sovereignty in Missouri, 1750-1860 (University of Oklahoma Press, 2000).
- Anglo-American Securities Regulation: Cultural and Political Roots, 1690-1860 (Cambridge University Press, 1998).

== See also ==
- List of law clerks for the eighth seat of the Supreme Court of the United States
