= National Association of Immigration Judges =

American professional association

The National Association of Immigration Judges is an American professional association (formerly a union) of judges, with the stated mission "to promote independence and enhance the professionalism, dignity, and efficiency of the Immigration Courts". Members are judges that work in the United States' Executive Office for Immigration Review, commonly known as the "Immigration Court".

For employment purposes, Immigration judges are categorized as attorneys, not judges, by their employer, the Justice Department.

== History ==
The union was founded in 1971, and was designated as the collective bargaining representative in 1979. In 2000, the union became affiliated with the International Federation of Professional and Technical Engineers.

=== Decertification attempts ===
In 2000, the Clinton administration attempted to decertify the union, arguing that the judges are managers who can’t form unions under the Federal Service labor-Management Relations statute but the Federal Labor Relations Authority (FLRA) determined that the immigration judges were not managers.

In 2019, the Trump administration also began efforts to decertify the union. This was again rejected by the FLRA on July 31, 2020. However in November 2020 the FLRA agreed, 2-1, that immigration judges are "management officials" which renders them ineligible to be represented by a union.
