= Cuban Democracy Act =

1992 United States sanction

- Other short titles: Armament Retooling and Manufacturing Support Act of 1992; Army National Guard Combat Readiness Reform Act of 1992; Cuban Democracy Act of 1992; Defense Conversion, Reinvestment, and Transition Assistance Act of 1992; Former Soviet Union Demilitarization Act of 1992; Iran-Iraq Arms Non-Proliferation Act of 1992; Military Construction Authorization Act for Fiscal Year 1993; Panama Canal Commission Authorization Act for Fiscal Year 1993; Service Members Occupational Conversion and Training Act of 1992; Weapons of Mass Destruction Control Act of 1992
- Long title: An Act to authorize appropriations for fiscal year 1993 for military activities of the Department of Defense, for military construction, and for defense activities of the Department of Energy, to prescribe personnel strengths for fiscal year for the Armed Forces, to provide for defense conversion, and for other purposes.
- Nicknames: National Defense Authorization Act for Fiscal Year 1993
- Enacted by: the 102nd United States Congress
- Effective: October 23, 1992

Citations
- Public law: 102-484
- Statutes at Large: 106 Stat. 2315 aka 106 Stat. 2575

Codification
- Titles amended: 22 U.S.C.: Foreign Relations and Intercourse
- U.S.C. sections created: 22 U.S.C. ch. 69 § 6001 et seq.

Legislative history
- Introduced in the House as H.R. 5006 by Les Aspin (D–WI) on April 29, 1992; Committee consideration by House Armed Services, Senate Armed Services; Passed the Senate on September 19, 1992 (passed voice vote, in lieu of S. 3140); Passed the House on September 24, 1992 (276-135 Roll call vote 423, via Clerk.House.gov, in lieu of H.R. 5323); Reported by the joint conference committee on October 1, 1992; agreed to by the House on October 3, 1992 (304-100, Roll call vote 461, via Clerk.House.gov) and by the Senate on October 5, 1992 (agreed unanimous consent); Signed into law by President George H. W. Bush on October 23, 1992

The Cuban Democracy Act (CDA), also known as the Torricelli Act or the Torricelli-Graham Bill, was a bill introduced and sponsored by U.S. Congressman Robert Torricelli and aimed to tighten the U.S. embargo on Cuba. It reimplemented the ban of U.S. subsidiaries in other countries from trading with Cuba, hindered the ability for ships docked within Cuban ports to travel to U.S. ports, and worked to circumvent other aspects of the embargo to provide humanitarian aid to Cuba in an attempt to draw the Cuban people closer to the United States.

The act was passed as "A bill to promote U.S. intervention through the application of sanctions directed at the Castro government and support for the Cuban people." Congressman Torricelli stated that the act was intended to "wreak havoc on that island."

== Context ==
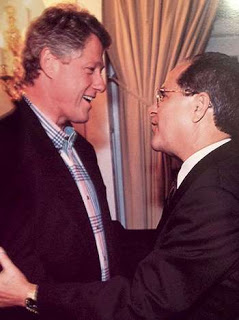
President Bill Clinton (left) talking to Jorge Mas Canosa, leader of the Cuban American National Foundation (CANF)

Since Fidel Castro flocked into the embrace of the Soviets for economic stronghold after the Cuban Missile Crisis, the United States worked to cripple the Cuban economy and destabilize Castro's rule. After the fall of the Soviet Union in 1991, Castro led a “Special Period” in Cuban economics, generating some financial upturn as Cuba grappled with a lack of Soviet assistance. As a result, the Cuban American National Foundation (CANF) worked with Floridian politicians Connie Mack III and Bob Graham to expand the embargo by banning subsidiary trade with Cuba, informally known as the Mack Amendment. Congressman Torricelli of New Jersey also formed a political relationship with CANF president Jorge Mas Canosa, and it was Torricelli who then penned the Cuban Democracy Act in 1991.

The CANF wished to work with Senators Mack and Graham due to the lack of action from President George H. W. Bush later in his first term, who opted for a more pragmatic, anti-embargo approach in a similar vein to the policies of Gerald Ford. However, the 1992 presidential election caused Bush to sway towards a more hardline approach to Cuba, in an effort to win over the large Cuban American population in his favor from his main opponent, Arkansas governor Bill Clinton.

Bush's change in faith of the Cuban Democracy Act was the result of his office at stake in addition to the ability for the president to suspend the act in the event of “national security,” creating a means of escape from the aspects Bush disagreed with, namely the Mack Amendment. Despite Bush's efforts to pass the Cuban Democracy Act, Clinton still won the support of Mas Canosa and many in the Cuban-American community, yet he was not able to win the electoral support of Florida.

== Contents ==
=== Sanctions and the Mack Amendment (Track I) ===
The bill itself lays out America's criticism of the Castro government, noting that "The government of Fidel Castro has demonstrated consistent disregard for internationally accepted standards of human rights and for democratic values." The first track of the bill tightened sanctions on the island and attacked countries that provided assistance to Cuba by denying said countries debt reduction or forgiveness. In other words, Track I stipulated that, if a nation gave a certain amount of aid to Cuba, then the U.S. would cut off the same sum of aid to said nation. Another aspect of the bill's first track was the Mack Amendment, tackling the trade between Cuba and U.S. subsidiaries in other countries, which generated $700 million (~$1.43 billion in 2024) in 1991 alone. The Mack Amendment became effective in diverting needs to the island, as the bulk of trade with the banned subsidiaries consisted of food and medicine.

=== Humanitarian Aid (Track II) ===
Deviating from the economic war on Cuba, the CDA's second track worked to provide aid to the Cuban people in an effort to destabilize Castro and put faith in the United States. This included opening up exports for food and medicine, as well as allowing family remittances, postal services, and telecommunications to and from Cuba. Bush's signing statement for the bill emphasized the public rationale for the second track of the bill by saying "Our policy and this bill allow for humanitarian donations of food and medicine to nongovernment organizations in Cuba, help that will get to the Cuban people. And it allows for improved communications between the United States and Cuba, so that all of you can maintain contact with family members." While originally the bill included the exchange of educational services and news offices in both Havana and Washington, groups against Castro led congress to balk against these additions.

== Legacy ==
=== Domestic reaction ===
==== Criticism ====
From the U.S. perspective, the New York Times argued that sanctions would only amplify Castro's fight against American hegemony in Latin America and put more faith and confidence in the regime. The editorial additionally notes that the collapse of the Soviet Union and economy already had detrimental effects on Cuban trade that relied heavily on the Soviets. In addition, Kam S. Wong from the University of Pennsylvania Law School argued in 1994 that the bill is in violation of international law along with foreign sovereign compulsion and crackdown on trade.

==== Effects on the Clinton Administration ====
The Cuban Democracy Act both fostered and broke apart the relationship between Clinton and the CANF. This was due to Mas Canosa's expectations regarding the position of the assistant secretary of state for Inter-American affairs, which instead was planned to go to Mario L. Baeza, an Afro-Cuban lawyer. However, Baeza's distance from the Cuban-American community ultimately led to the CANF leading a campaign to thwart his appointment, leading to the instatement of Alexander F. Watson. Once in office, Clinton utilized a loophole within the act that allowed him to suspend it under the guise of "national security." This dodging of a law in order to avoid true implementation further frustrated Cuban-American groups.

=== International reaction ===
Only days after Bush signed the bill into law on October 23, the European Commission protested that the act violated the conventions of international trade. Likewise, the United Kingdom used the Protection of Trading Interests Act 1980 as a means of political protest against the Mack Amendment specifically. Canada and many Latin American nations also expressed concern and condemnation of the bill's implications on international trade with Cuba.

This opposition manifested into a Cuban-sponsored resolution in the United Nations on ending the embargo shortly after the bill was signed. The resolution was carefully written to create content with the international community, as many were still wary of Castro's track record but still wished to block the U.S.'s attempts to control trade between Cuba and other countries.

== See also ==
- Cuba and democracy
- Cuba–United States relations
- Godfrey–Milliken Bill
- Helms–Burton Act
