= Bill C-14 =

Bill C-14 refers to various legislation introduced into the House of Commons of Canada, including:

- Foreign Extraterritorial Measures Act, introduced in 1984 to the first session of the 33rd Parliament
- Canada Transportation Act, establishing the Canadian Transportation Agency, introduced in 1996 to the second session of the 35th Parliament
- An Act to amend the Criminal Code and to make related amendments to other Acts (medical assistance in dying), introduced in 2016 to the only session of the 42nd Parliament
- Preserving Provincial Representation in the House of Commons Act, introduced in 2022 to the first session of the 44th Parliament
