= Helms–Burton Act =

US federal law concerning embargo against Cuba

- Other short titles: Cuban Liberty and Democratic Solidarity (LIBERTAD) Act of 1995
- Long title: An Act to seek international sanctions against the Castro government in Cuba, to plan for support of a transition government leading to a democratically elected government in Cuba, and for other purposes.
- Acronyms (colloquial): CLDSA, LIBERTAD
- Nicknames: Cuban Liberty and Democratic Solidarity (LIBERTAD) Act of 1996
- Enacted by: the 104th United States Congress
- Effective: March 12, 1996

Citations
- Public law: 104-114
- Statutes at Large: 110 Stat. 785

Codification
- Titles amended: 22 U.S.C.: Foreign Relations and Intercourse
- U.S.C. sections created: 22 U.S.C. ch. 69A § 6021 et seq.

Legislative history
- Introduced in the House as H.R. 927 by Dan Burton (R–IN) on February 14, 1995; Committee consideration by House International Relations, House Ways and Means, House Judiciary, House Banking and Financial Services; Passed the House on September 21, 1995 (294–130, Roll call vote 683, via Clerk.House.gov); Passed the Senate on October 19, 1995 (74-24, Roll call vote 494, via Senate.gov); Reported by the joint conference committee on March 1, 1996; agreed to by the Senate on March 5, 1996 (74-22, Roll call vote 22, via Senate.gov) and by the House on March 6, 1996 (336–86, Roll call vote 047, via Clerk.House.gov); Signed into law by President Bill Clinton on March 12, 1996

United States Supreme Court cases
- Havana Docks Corp. v. Royal Caribbean Cruises, No. 24-983, 608 U.S. ___ (2026); Exxon Mobil Corp. v. Corporación Cimex, S. A. (Cuba), No. 24-699, 609 U.S. ___ (2026)

The Cuban Liberty and Democratic Solidarity (Libertad) Act of 1996 (Helms–Burton Act), Pub. L. 104–114 (text) (PDF), 110 Stat. 785, 22 U.S.C. §§ 6021–6091) is a United States federal law which strengthens and continues the United States embargo against Cuba. It extended the territorial application of the initial embargo to apply to foreign companies trading with Cuba, and penalized foreign companies allegedly "trafficking" in property formerly owned by U.S. citizens but confiscated by Cuba after the Cuban Revolution. It also covers property formerly owned by Cubans who have since become U.S. citizens.

The Act is named for its original sponsors, Senator Jesse Helms, Republican of North Carolina, and Representative Dan Burton, Republican of Indiana.

It was passed by the 104th Congress on March 6, 1996, and enacted into law by President Bill Clinton, on March 12, 1996. The bill, which had been tabled in late 1995 after Senator Helms was unable to overcome several Democratic filibusters, was reintroduced prompted by an episode a month earlier. On February 24, 1996, Cuban fighter jets shot down two private planes. Whether they were shot down over Cuban territory or international airspace is a matter of debate.

== Content ==
This law includes a wide variety of provisions intended to bring about "a peaceful transition to a representative democracy and market economy in Cuba":

- International Sanctions against the Cuban Government. Economic embargo, any non-U.S. company that deals economically with Cuba can be subjected to legal action and that company's leadership can be barred from entry into the United States. Sanctions may be applied to non-U.S. companies trading with Cuba. This means that internationally operating companies have to choose between Cuba and the U.S., which is a much larger market.
- United States opposition against Cuban membership in International Financial Institutions.
- Television broadcasting from the United States to Cuba.
- Authorization of United States support for "democratic and human rights groups" and international observers.
- Declares United States policy towards a "transition government" and a "democratically elected government" in Cuba.
- Protection of property rights of certain United States nationals.
- Exclusion of certain aliens from the United States, primarily senior officials or major stock holders, and their families, of companies that do business in Cuba on property expropriated from American citizens. To date, executives from Italy, Mexico, Canada, Israel, and the United Kingdom have been barred.
- Provides power to the Legislative Branch to override an Executive Branch cancellation of the embargo, although such a legislative veto had been ruled unconstitutional by the Supreme Court 13 years earlier. Unlike in that case though, which concerned a review only by the House of Representatives, the Helms–Burton Act (sec. 204(e)) subjects the President's decision to a review by joint resolution of both chambers of Congress.
- Prohibits the completion of the Juragua Nuclear Power Plant. (Note: These requirements under the Helms–Burton Act have been fulfilled.) (Note: In December 2000 Fidel Castro announced that Cuba was terminating plans for the construction of the Juragua nuclear plant in his meeting with Russian President Vladimir Putin.)
- Prompts for the retirement of former Soviet Union personnel out of Cuban military and intelligence facilities, including the military and intelligence facilities at Lourdes and Cienfuegos. (Note: In October 2001, Russia announced plans to shut down the Lourdes Signals Intelligence facility, which it did in August 2002.)
- Prohibits recognition of a transitional government in Cuba that includes Fidel or Raúl Castro.
- Prohibits recognition of a Cuban government that has not provided compensation for U.S. certified claims against confiscated property, defined as non-residential property with an excess of $50,000 value in 1959.
- Prompts for extradition or otherwise rendition to the United States of all persons sought by the United States Department of Justice for crimes committed in the United States.

== Summary ==
Title I strengthened sanctions against the current Cuban Government. Among many other provisions, it codified the U.S. embargo on trade and financial transactions which had been in effect pursuant to a Presidential proclamation since the Kennedy Administration.

Title II describes U.S. policy toward and assistance to a free and independent Cuba. It required the President to produce a plan for providing economic assistance to a transition or democratic government in Cuba. (The President delivered the plan to Congress in January 1997.)

Title III creates a private cause of action and authorizes U.S. nationals with claims to confiscated property in Cuba to file suit in U.S. courts against persons that may be "trafficking" in that property. The filing fee for the Title III action is set by US Courts at $6,458 (from December 2016), a level that would discourage all but serious claims. The Act grants the President the authority to suspend the lawsuit provisions for periods of up to 6 months if it is necessary to the national interest of the United States and will expedite a transition to democracy in Cuba. Successive presidents have exercised this authority, most recently in June 2018, pursuant to a non-binding declaration of intention in April 1997 that came out of a trade dispute with the European Union. In 2019 President Trump allowed the suspension to expire, and Carnival Cruise was promptly sued under the act.

Title IV requires the denial of visas to and exclusion from the U.S. of persons who, after March 12, 1996, confiscate or "traffic" in confiscated property in Cuba claimed by U.S. nationals. The objective of this provision is to protect the status of confiscated U.S. property and to support existing sanctions against the current regime. The State Department reviews a broad range of economic activity in Cuba to determine the applicability of Title IV. The results of this effort appear not only in the actual determinations of "trafficking," but also in the deterrent to investment in confiscated U.S. property and in the exacerbation of the uncertainty of investing in Cuba.

== Legislative history ==
- October 19, 1995: Passed Senate, 74–24.
- March 6, 1996: Passed House, 336–86.
- March 12, 1996: Signed by President Bill Clinton.

== Reactions ==
The Helms–Burton Act was condemned by the Council of Europe, the European Union, Britain, Canada, Mexico, Brazil, Argentina and other U.S. allies that enjoy normal trade relations with Cuba. The governments argued that the law ran counter to the spirit of international law and sovereignty.

After a complaint by the European Union with the World Trade Organization, a dispute settlement panel was established. Later, the work of the panel was suspended to find a solution through negotiations. After a year, the panel lost its jurisdiction over the matter, and the EU did not pursue the matter any further before the WTO.

The law has also been condemned by humanitarian groups because these groups argue that sanctions against an entire country will affect only the innocent population.

The law provides for compensation of only the largest of claims for confiscated property, primarily only the claims of large multinational companies (valued at roughly $6 billion). It fails to provide for the claims of individuals of the exiled Cuban-American community whose personal residences were confiscated.

The European Union introduced a Council Regulation (No 2271/96) (law binding all member states) declaring the extraterritorial provisions of the Helms–Burton Act to be unenforceable within the EU, and permitting recovery of any damages imposed under it. The EU law also applied sanctions against US companies and their executives for making Title III complaints.

The United Kingdom had previously introduced provisions by statutory instrument extending its Protection of Trading Interests Act 1980 (originally passed in the wake of extraterritorial claims by the U.S. in the 1970s) to United States rules on trade with Cuba. United Kingdom law was later extended to counter-act the Helms–Burton Act as well. This included criminal sanctions for complying with extraterritorial provisions of the Helms–Burton Act whilst in the UK.

Mexico passed the Law of Protection of Commerce and Investments from Foreign Policies that Contravene International Law in October 1996, aimed at neutralizing the Helms–Burton Act. The law provides for a fine of 2.2 million pesos, or $280,254, against anyone who while in Mexican territory obeys another country's laws aimed at reducing Mexican trade or foreign investment in a third country. This law was used against the Sheraton Maria Isabel Hotel and Towers in Mexico City, which had expelled a group of Cuban officials upon pressure from the United States government and confiscated their funds.

Similarly, Canada passed the "An Act to amend the Foreign Extraterritorial Measures Act" (C-54), a law to counteract the effect of Helms–Burton. In addition, its legislature proposed (but did not pass) the tongue-in-cheek Godfrey–Milliken Bill, so named in the American style, that mirrored Helms–Burton, replacing the Cuban revolution with the American revolution. Sponsored by Loyalist descendants, it demanded recompense for United Empire Loyalists and proposed travel restrictions on those trafficking in property confiscated during the American Revolution. One of its sponsors, MP Peter Milliken, went on to serve as Speaker of the Canadian House of Commons.

Presidents Bill Clinton, George W. Bush, Barack Obama and Donald Trump all signed a waiver of parts of the law.

Effective May 10, 1999, with CFR Title 31 Part 515, the act was amended. In 2000, the law was further amended with the passage of the Trade Sanction Reform and Export Enhancement Act, which allowed the export of US agriculture and medical goods to Cuba so long as certain conditions were met.

== Legal Usage ==
The Helms–Burton Act has served as the legal basis for numerous lawsuits by the title owners of pre-1959 Cuban property. Travel website Expedia, Carnival Cruise Line, and American Airlines have all been the target of such suits since 2019, when several waivers related to the law were revoked. The 2026 United States Supreme Court case Havana Docks Corp. v. Royal Caribbean Cruises provided further legal guidelines for the usage of the law.

== See also ==
- Godfrey–Milliken Bill
- Cuba–United States relations
