= Law of Protection of Commerce and Investments from Foreign Policies that Contravene International Law =

The Law of Protection of Commerce and Investments from Foreign Policies that Contravene International Law (Spanish: Ley de Protección al Comercio y la Inversión de Normas Extranjeras que Contravengan el Derecho Internacional) is the law passed by the government of Mexico in response to the Helms-Burton Act, a United States federal law. The Helms-Burton Act, passed in March 1996, was designed to strengthen the United States embargo against Cuba.

The law was published on October 23, 1996 in the Official Journal of the Federation during the Ernesto Zedillo administration. In its first article, this law explicitly prohibits individuals or organizations, whether public or private, that are within the borders of Mexico from participating in any action that affects commerce or investment if those acts correspond to the application of laws of foreign countries.

== Sheraton Hotel incident ==
The first instance of a violation to this law happened almost ten years later when employees of the American-owned Sheraton Mexico City Maria Isabel Hotel of Mexico City expelled a group of Cuban officials upon pressure from the United States government and confiscated their funds. The Cuban officials were meeting U.S. energy executives from organizations that included Valero, the United States' biggest oil refiner, the Louisiana Department of Economic Development, and the Texas port of Corpus Christi.

Voices of opposition were soon heard from the government of Mexico, the Government of Cuba, and most candidates in the 2006 presidential election. The Chamber of Deputies publicly condemned the violation of Mexican law and the rights of a group of consumers who were subjected to discrimination. On February 7, the United States Department of State declared on this matter that American law imposed upon American companies is applied regardless of the location of the company.

== See also ==
- Law of Mexico
- Foreign Extraterritorial Measures Act (FEMA), a similar act passed in Canada.
