= Havana Docks Corp. v. Royal Caribbean Cruises =

Havana Docks Corporation v. Royal Caribbean Cruises
- Supreme Court of the United States

Argued February 23, 2026 Decided May 21, 2026
- Full case name: Havana Docks Corporation v. Royal Caribbean Cruises, LTD., Norwegian Cruise Line Hondings, LTD., Carnival Corporation, MSC Cruises S.A., and MSC Cruises (USA), Inc.
- Docket no.: 24-983
- Argument: Oral argument
- Decision: Opinion

Holding
- The "property which was confiscated" in the Helms–Burton Act can refer both to the physical property and the plaintiff's interest in that property. Therefore, the property is tainted such that anyone who uses the property can be liable to those who had an interest in the tainted property when it was confiscated.

Court membership
- Chief Justice John Roberts Associate Justices Clarence Thomas · Samuel Alito; Sonia Sotomayor · Elena Kagan; Neil Gorsuch · Brett Kavanaugh; Amy Coney Barrett · Ketanji Brown Jackson

Case opinions
- Majority: Thomas, joined by Roberts, Alito, Sotomayor, Gorsuch, Kavanaugh, Barrett, Jackson
- Concurrence: Sotomayor, joined by Kavanaugh
- Dissent: Kagan

Laws applied
- Cuban Liberty and Democratic Solidarity (Libertad) Act of 1996 (Helms–Burton Act); 22 U.S.C. §§ 6081(6) & 6082(a)(1).

Havana Docks Corp. v. Royal Caribbean Cruises, Ltd., 608 U.S. ___ (2026), was a United States Supreme Court case in which the court held that the "property which was confiscated" under Title III of the Helms–Burton Act can refer both to the physical property and the plaintiff's interest in that property. Therefore, the property is tainted such that anyone who uses the property can be liable to those who had an interest in the tainted property when it was confiscated. In the 8–1 decision issued on May 21, 2026, the Court held that U.S. cruise lines can be held liable for "trafficking" in confiscated Cuban docks, even if the original American claimant's time-limited property lease for those docks would have expired prior to the cruise lines' use of the property. During oral arguments, Richard D. Klingler represented Havana Docks Corporation, supported by Assistant to the Solicitor General Aimee Brown arguing for the United States as amicus curiae. Paul D. Clement argued on behalf of the cruise lines.

== Background ==
=== Havana Docks Corporation ===
The three docks that were seized by the Cuban government from Havana Docks Corp. as they appeared at the time of seizure

In 1905, the Cuban government granted Compañia del Puerto a 50-year "usufructuary concession" of the Port of Havana. A usufructuary concession is the combination of a "usufruct" - the "right to use, enjoy, or profit from another’s property”, and a "concession" - a “privilege granted by the government". The usufructuary concession between the Cuban government and Compañia del Puerto required the company to build the docks for Cuba and then allowed them to exclusively profit from those docks for a limited time (50 years).

In 1928, the usufructuary concession was transferred from Compañia del Puerto to the US based Havana Docks Corporation. Havana Docks Corporation was founded by Sosthenes Behn, the founder of ITT Corporation. When the Cuban government granted this property-interest, the original 50-year lease was extended to a 99-year lease (expiring in 2004). This agreement gave Havana Docks Corp. "the exclusive possession of, and the right to receive the economic benefits from, the physical property subject to the concession (i.e., the docks, terminal building, and associated land" of Havana Harbor.

Cuban revolutionaries on tanks seizing the Havana Docks Corporation on November 21st, 1960

On November 21st, 1960 following the Cuban Revolution, the Havana Docks Corporation's property interest was seized and subsequently nationalized by the Cuban government. During the physical takeover, the company was managed by Sosthenes Behn's son William Behn. At the time of seizure, the concession was valued at $9.5 million (equivalent to US$103,388,639 in 2025).

Between 2015 and 2019, following the Cuban Thaw under President Barack Obama, Carnival Corporation, MSC Cruises, Royal Caribbean Cruises Ltd and Norwegian Cruise Line Holdings "disembarked nearly one million tourists on those docks" for which they paid the Cuban government "at least $130 million in hard currency without paying a penny to either Havana Docks or any Cuban person or entity unaffiliated with the regime".

=== Helms-Burton Act ===
The Helms–Burton Act, formally the Cuban Liberty and Democratic Solidarity (Libertad) Act of 1996, is a U.S. federal law that strengthened the United States embargo against Cuba. The statute penalizes foreign and domestic companies that do business in Cuba, specifically targeting those that "traffic" in property confiscated by the Cuban government following the Cuban Revolution.

Title III of the Act is the central mechanism for these penalties. It creates a private cause of action, allowing U.S. nationals whose property was expropriated to sue individuals or corporations that subsequently profit from, or traffic in, that property. However, the legislation granted the President the authority to suspend Title III lawsuits for six-month intervals if deemed necessary to the national interest. From the Act's passage in 1996, successive presidential administrations continuously suspended this provision, largely to avoid diplomatic and trade conflicts with international allies.

In 2019, the Trump administration allowed the Title III suspension to expire, ending the decades-long freeze. This policy change activated the private right of action, allowing the Havana Docks Corporation to file a lawsuit against the cruise lines that had used their confiscated Cuban assets.

The Supreme Court granted certiorari.

== Opinion of the court ==
The Supreme Court issued an opinion on May 21, 2026.

=== Kagan's dissent ===
Justice Elena Kagan dissented. Because the Cuban government had always owned the docks, she said that the docks did not qualify as "property which was confiscated by the Cuban government" She pointed out that Havana Docks's property interest (its lease) in the docks had expired in 2004. "At the end of the day," she wrote, "the Court's interpretation of [the Helms-Burton Act] treats all property interests as if they were perpetual ones." Her interpretation of the act was that "a plaintiff can recover under [the Helms-Burton Act] only when the defendant traffics in the actual property that was confiscated from the plaintiff. Here, that means Havana Docks’ claim should fail, because the cruise lines did not traffic in Havana Docks’ time-limited—and long-ago expired—concession."

== See also ==
- Exxon Mobil Corp. v. Corporación Cimex
