= Bill C-339: Godfrey–Milliken Act =

Parody bill in the Canadian House of Commons

Parliament of Canada
- Long title: Bill C-339: An Act to permit descendants of United Empire Loyalists who fled the land that later became the United States of America after the 1776 American Revolution to establish a claim to the property they or their ancestors owned in the United States that was confiscated without compensation, and claim compensation for it in the Canadian courts, and to exclude from Canada any foreign person trafficking in such property
- Considered by: House of Commons of Canada

Legislative history
- Bill citation: Bill C-339, House of Commons Bills, 35th Parliament, Second Session
- Introduced by: Peter Milliken; John Godfrey
- First reading: October 22, 1996

Related legislation
- Helms–Burton Act
- Status: Not passed

Bill C-339: Godfrey–Milliken Act (French: Projet de loi C-330: Loi de Godfrey–Milliken) was a private member's bill introduced in the Parliament of Canada by Liberal MPs John Godfrey and Peter Milliken. The bill was intended as a parody of the American Helms–Burton Act.

The Helms–Burton Act set up stringent punishments on any business or person that profited from property of American businesses and people that had been seized in the Cuban Revolution. The bill included a policy of punishing foreign nations and companies who had profited from this seized property (which in practice means trading with Cuba at all, since everything in Cuba is in some way connected to such property). This included a number of Canadian companies.

The 1996 bill responded by calling for descendants of United Empire Loyalists who fled the American Revolution to be able to reclaim land and property that had been confiscated during the revolution. The bill would have also allowed the Canadian government to exclude corporate officers, or controlling shareholders of companies that possess property formerly owned by Loyalists, as well as the spouse and minor children of such persons from entering Canada.

In total some three million Canadians are descendants of United Empire Loyalists, including Godfrey and Milliken. The current value of the land and property seized during the American Revolution is many billions of dollars.

The bill received widespread attention in Canada and also some publicity in the United States, including a feature on 60 Minutes. In some cases it was also called the American Liberty and Democratic Solidarity (Loyalty) Act.

The Godfrey–Milliken Bill was not enacted by Parliament. Godfrey later supported Bill C-54, a government bill which amended the Foreign Extraterritorial Measures Act. The amendments neutralized any attempt to enforce the Helms–Burton Act against Canadians or Canadian companies. The amendments blocked access to Canadian records for the prosecution of any case under the Helms–Burton Act, allowed the Attorney General of Canada to block Canadian courts from enforcing judgments emanating from US jurisdictions against Canadian defendants, and permitted Canadian defendants to counter-sue in Canadian courts. It also imposed a fine of up to $1.5 million on any Canadian entity that aided any prosecution under Helms–Burton, and a fine of up to $150,000 on any individual Canadian who did so. (Note: Equivalent to $2,765,886 and $275,587, respectively, in 2025: Bank of Canada Inflation Calculator.)

== See also ==
- Canada–Caribbean relations
- Canada–Cuba relations
- Canada–Latin America relations
- Cuban Canadian
- Foreign relations of Canada
- Foreign relations of Cuba
- United States embargo against Cuba
