= Exxon Mobil Corp. v. Corporación Cimex, S. A. (Cuba) =

- Supreme Court of the United States

Decided June 23, 2026
- Full case name: Exxon Mobil Corp. v. Corporación Cimex, S. A.
- Docket no.: 24-699
- Citations: 609 U.S. ___ (more)

Case history
- Prior: 111 F.4th 12

Holding
- The Helms–Burton Act itself abrogates the sovereign immunity of Cuban agencies and instrumentalities, so plaintiffs who sue Cuban agencies or instrumentalities under the act do not need to also satisfy one of Foreign Sovereign Immunities Act's exceptions to foreign sovereign immunity.

Court membership
- Chief Justice John Roberts Associate Justices Clarence Thomas · Samuel Alito; Sonia Sotomayor · Elena Kagan; Neil Gorsuch · Brett Kavanaugh; Amy Coney Barrett · Ketanji Brown Jackson

Case opinions
- Majority: Kavanaugh, joined by Roberts, Thomas, Alito, Gorsuch, Barrett
- Dissent: Kagan, joined by Sotomayor, Jackson

Exxon Mobil Corp. v. Corporación Cimex, S. A. (Cuba), 609 U.S. ___ (2026), was a United States Supreme Court case in which the court held that the Helms–Burton Act itself abrogates the sovereign immunity of Cuban agencies and instrumentalities, so plaintiffs who sue Cuban agencies or instrumentalities under the act do not need to also satisfy one of Foreign Sovereign Immunities Act's exceptions to foreign sovereign immunity.

== Background ==
In 1960, after Fidel Castro seized power in Cuba, the Cuban Government confiscated many foreign-owned assets, including Exxon's oil refinery, terminals, packaging plants, and more than a hundred service stations. Since that time, two Cuban government-owned companies—Unión Cuba-Petróleo (CUPET) and Corporación CIMEX, S. A. (Cuba) (CIMEX)—operated and profited from Exxon's expropriated assets. Exxon had no good way to sue the Cuban government entities and seek compensation for its confiscated property until Congress passed and President Bill Clinton signed the Helms-Burton Act in 1996. As relevant here, the act created a private right of action for US nationals whose property was confiscated by the Cuban Government against "any person that... traffics in" the confiscated property with "person" defined to include "any agency or instrumentality of a foreign state". Exxon sued CUPET, CIMEX, and later CIMEX's Panamanian alter ego under the Helms-Burton Act in the United States District Court for the District of Columbia, seeking more than $1 billion in damages. The Cuban government-owned companies moved to dismiss, asserting immunity under the generally applicable Foreign Sovereign Immunities Act (FSIA). Exxon countered that the Helms-Burton Act itself waived the defendants' sovereign immunity. The District Court sided with the Cuban government defendants, and a divided panel of the United States Court of Appeals for the D.C. Circuit affirmed.

The Supreme Court granted certiorari.

== Opinion of the court ==
The Supreme Court issued an opinion on June 23, 2026.

== See also ==
- Havana Docks Corp. v. Royal Caribbean Cruises
