= St. Regis New York =

Hotel in Manhattan, New York

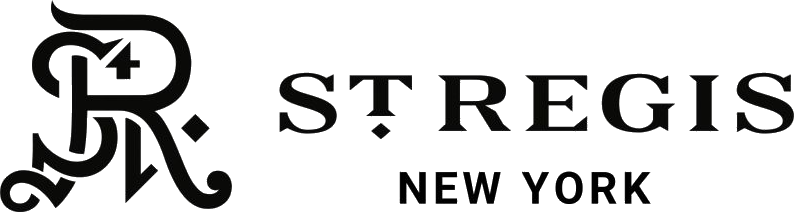

- The hotel's Fifth Avenue facade in 2026
- Hotel chain: St. Regis Hotels & Resorts

General information
- Architectural style: Beaux-Arts
- Location: 2 East 55th Street; Manhattan, New York
- Coordinates: 40°45′41″N 73°58′29″W
- Opened: September 4, 1904; 122 years ago
- Owner: Qatar Investment Authority
- Operator: Marriott International

Technical details
- Floor count: 20

Design and construction
- Architects: Trowbridge & Livingston (original building); Sloan & Robertson (1927 addition)
- Developer: John Jacob Astor IV

Other information
- Number of rooms: 171
- Number of suites: 67
- Number of restaurants: 2

Website
- www.stregisnewyork.com

New York City Landmark
- Designated: November 1, 1988
- Reference no.: 1552

The St. Regis New York is a luxury hotel at 2 East 55th Street, at the southeast corner with Fifth Avenue, in the Midtown Manhattan neighborhood of New York City. The hotel was originally developed by John Jacob Astor IV and was completed in 1904 to designs by Trowbridge & Livingston. An annex to the east was designed by Sloan & Robertson and completed in 1927. The hotel is operated by Marriott International and holds Forbes five-star and AAA five-diamond ratings. In addition, it is a New York City designated landmark.

The 18-story hotel was designed in the Beaux-Arts style. The facade of the original hotel is made of limestone and is divided into three horizontal sections similar to the components of a column, namely a base, shaft, and capital. The St. Regis required a large amount of mechanical equipment, which was placed on three basement levels. When the St. Regis opened, the interior was extensively decorated in marble and bronze. The first floor contained a restaurant, café, palm court, and hotel office, while the second floor contained a banquet hall, ballroom, and private dining room.

Astor began constructing the hotel in 1901 and named it after Upper St. Regis Lake in the Adirondack Mountains. The hotel opened on September 4, 1904, and quickly became known as an upscale hostelry. Rudolph Haan operated the hotel from its opening until 1926. Astor's son Vincent Astor sold the St. Regis in 1927 to Benjamin Newton Duke, who developed the annex. After an acrimonious dispute in 1934, Vincent Astor re-acquired the hotel the next year and continued to own it until his death in 1959. The hotel was sold several times in the early 1960s, and Cesar Balsa operated the hotel briefly before the St. Regis joined the Sheraton Hotels and Resorts chain in 1966. The St. Regis has been renovated several times over the years, and it became part of the Marriott chain in 2016. The Qatar Investment Authority bought the hotel building in 2019.

== Site ==
The St. Regis New York is at 2 East 55th Street in the Midtown Manhattan neighborhood of New York City. It is on the southeast corner of Fifth Avenue to the west and 55th Street to the north. The land lot is L-shaped and covers 22,544 ft^{2} (2,094.4 m^{2}), with a frontage of 250 ft (76 m) on 55th Street and a depth of 100 ft (30 m). Nearby sites include the University Club of New York to the southwest; The Peninsula New York hotel to the west; the Fifth Avenue Presbyterian Church and 712 Fifth Avenue to the northwest; 550 Madison Avenue to the northeast; 19 East 54th Street to the east; and 689 Fifth Avenue and the William H. Moore House to the south.

When the St. Regis was announced in 1900, the L-shaped site measured 150 ft (46 m) wide on 55th Street to the north and 75 ft (23 m) wide on Fifth Avenue to the west. The eastern end of the site measured 100 ft (30 m) deep. The L-shaped site spanned 12,500 ft^{2} (1,160 m^{2}), though the developers obtained an additional 7,500 ft^{2} (700 m^{2}) by acquiring another site on 55th Street. Before the St. Regis Hotel was developed, there were proposals to develop a clubhouse for the New York Republican Club on the site. The plot was expanded to 25,000 ft^{2} (2,300 m^{2}) in early 1927, with a frontage of 100 feet on Fifth Avenue and 250 feet on 55th Street.

== History ==
=== Background ===
Fifth Avenue between 42nd Street and Central Park South (59th Street) was relatively undeveloped through the late 19th century, and many row houses were developed on the avenue. By the early 1900s, that section of Fifth Avenue was becoming a commercial area. Lily Churchill, Duchess of Marlborough, owned the site at the southwest corner of Fifth Avenue and 55th Street until 1891, when she sold it to William Backhouse Astor Jr. for $55,000. After William Astor's death, the site passed first to his widow Caroline Schermerhorn Astor, then to their son John Jacob Astor IV.

John Jacob Astor IV was a co-owner of the original Waldorf-Astoria Hotel at Fifth Avenue and 34th Street; his great-grandfather John Jacob Astor had built one of the first modern hotels in the world, the Astor House in Lower Manhattan, in 1836. Although Astor had considered building a residence at Fifth Avenue and 55th Street in 1896, he ultimately decided to develop against it because of the area's increasingly commercial character. Astor announced plans for a three-story commercial structure on the site in 1899 but then changed his plans to those for a hotel. At his niece's suggestion, Astor named the new hotel after Upper St. Regis Lake in the Adirondacks, which in turn was named for French Jesuit priest Jean-François Régis.

=== Construction ===
At the end of December 1900, Astor leased the proposed Hotel St. Regis to hotelier Rudolph Haan for 20 years, with options for three 20-year extensions. New York City police commissioner Theodore Roosevelt had introduced Haan to the Astor family shortly before the hotel's development. The structure was budgeted at $1.25 million, excluding the $600,000 cost of the land. Excavation of the site began immediately after Haan leased the hotel. Trowbridge & Livingston had completed their designs for the project in early 1901. The original plans were similar to the final design, except that the roof had multiple chimneys. Astor acquired a row house at 6 East 55th Street, just east of the new hotel, in February 1901. Astor also acquired an option on the residence of Sarah Fox at 3 East 54th Street, next to William Rockefeller Jr.'s residence. By early 1902, the hotel's stonework was almost completed, and contractors were applying interior finishes. Haan acquired a second house at 8 East 55th Street in February 1902, which he planned to use for an annex to the hotel.

==== Controversies and delays ====
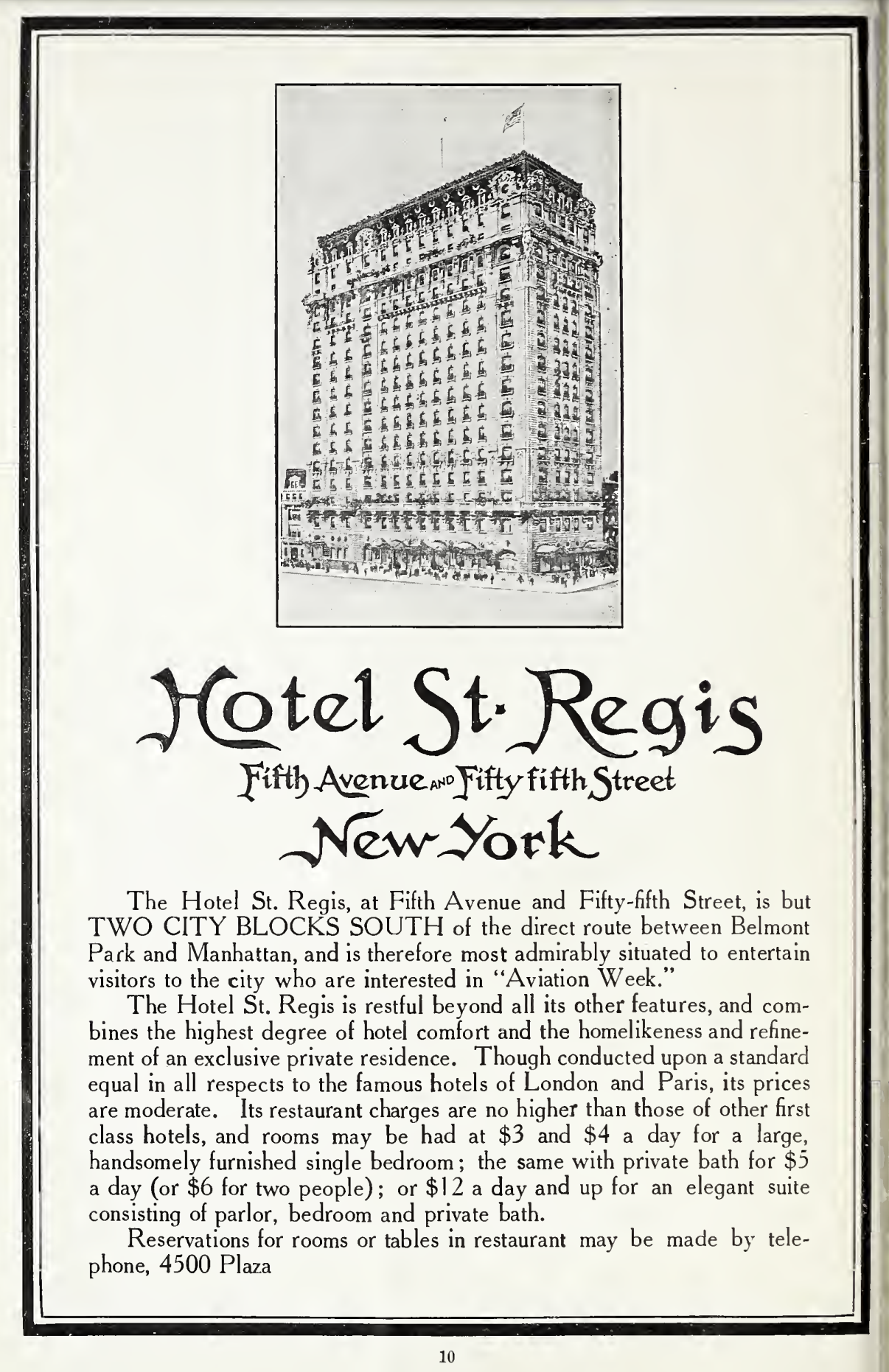
1910 Hotel St. Regis advertisement

The hotel was next to numerous wealthy New Yorkers' homes and, as such, was controversial from the start. Even as other commercial developments were being built along the midtown section of Fifth Avenue, concerned locals bought up nearby houses to prevent the construction of similar hotels in the area. Rockefeller, who opposed the project, bought Fox's house to prevent Astor from expanding the hotel to 54th Street. Several nearby properties were also damaged during the hotel's construction. For instance, city officials found in late 1901 that the excavations had ruptured a sewage pipe and flooded nearby houses, and a construction accident in early 1902 caused a marble block to smash through the roof of a neighboring house. One neighbor sued the construction contractor, the Thompson–Starrett Company, after his house was repeatedly damaged by debris, construction materials, and leaks. Construction was temporarily halted in May 1902 after the Bureau of Buildings discovered that the hotel's yellow-pine wood decorations were not sufficiently fireproofed. The contractors agreed to replace the yellow pine with another wood, and work resumed shortly afterward. Haan traveled for two years to procure furniture and furnishings from Europe.

Midway during construction, Astor decided to lease only part of the hotel to families, rather than the entire hotel as originally planned. In addition, plans for the hotel were revised to include an annex at 6 and 8 East 55th Street. Construction of the annex began in February 1903, but work was temporarily delayed by a labor strike in June 1903. Astor also acquired a site at 10 East 55th Street from local residents who had bought it in an attempt to block a further annex to the hotel. A covenant required the site to be used as a private residence for 15 years, and Astor planned to erect a house for Haan on the site. The sites at 6–10 East 55th Street were excavated simultaneously to save money, and workers built three basements on the site of Haan's house. Several residents filed a lawsuit to halt the excavations, contending that the basements were being excavated for the hotel because no private residence would need such deep basements. A New York Supreme Court judge ruled against them in November 1903, saying that the covenant did not prevent multiple basements at 10 East 55th Street.

Astor and Haan wanted to obtain a liquor license to offset the high construction costs, to the annoyance of local residents who already opposed the hotel's construction. At the time, New York state law required that any establishment with a liquor license was required to gain the approval of the owners of two-thirds of all private property within 200 ft (61 m), and was required to be at least 200 feet from any church. The Fifth Avenue Presbyterian Church, which objected to the liquor license, was diagonally across from the hotel. (Note: Fifth Avenue is 100 ft (30 m) wide, while 55th Street is 30 ft (9.1 m) wide. As such, the distance between the church and the St. Regis is approximately 104 ft (32 m).) A significant number of local residents also objected to the liquor license. In early 1904, the New York State Legislature passed a bill that only required any churches within a 200-foot radius to consent to the license. The sponsors of this legislation did not attempt to hide the fact that the law targeted the St. Regis, and they knew the church would never provide such consent. Accordingly, Haan bought the house at 697 Fifth Avenue in June 1904, and he relocated the hotel's main entrance from Fifth Avenue to 55th Street, which was more than 200 feet away from the church. Haan obtained a liquor license the next month, and the church dropped its formal opposition to the license.

=== Opening and early years ===
The Hotel St. Regis opened on September 4, 1904, almost simultaneously with the completion of the Hotel Astor, operated by John Jacob Astor's cousin and rival, William Waldorf Astor. Thousands of people had sought invitations to the hotel's opening-night dinner. Haan said the new hotel would serve guests on a "first come, first served" basis. The hotel had cost $5.5 million to develop; the building itself had cost $4 million, while the furnishings had cost another $1.5 million. (Note: The total cost is equivalent to $197 million in 2025. The building cost the equivalent of $143 million, while the furnishings had cost the equivalent of $54 million. (Note: 1634–1699: McCusker, J. J. (1997). How Much Is That in Real Money? A Historical Price Index for Use as a Deflator of Money Values in the Economy of the United States: Addenda et Corrigenda (PDF). American Antiquarian Society. 1700–1799: McCusker, J. J. (1992). How Much Is That in Real Money? A Historical Price Index for Use as a Deflator of Money Values in the Economy of the United States (PDF). American Antiquarian Society. 1800–present: Federal Reserve Bank of Minneapolis. "Consumer Price Index (estimate) 1800–".))

==== John Jacob Astor ownership ====
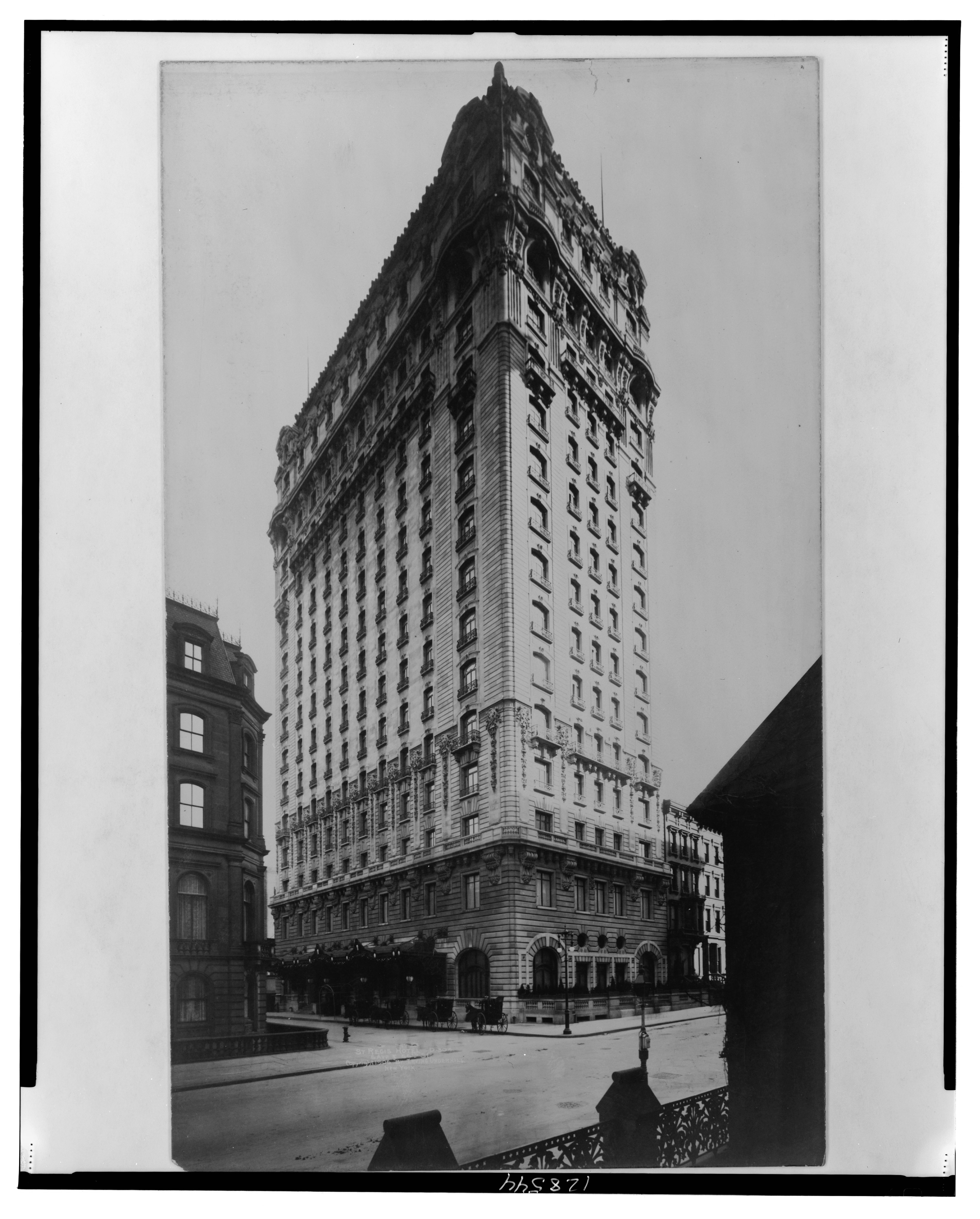
The St. Regis as seen circa 1905

In the months after the St. Regis opened, there was much coverage of its costs and expenses; for instance, one of the beds cost $10,000 (Note: This is equivalent to $358,000 in 2025.) and a turkey cost $4.50. (Note: This is equivalent to $161 in 2025.) Daily room rates ranged from $4 for the smallest suites to $125 for the state apartment. (Note: Equivalent to between $143 and $4,479 in 2025.) Haan disavowed claims that the hotel was expensive, saying: "We charge $14 a day for salon, bedchamber, and bath." Media reports still exaggerated the hotel's high prices. According to Town and Country magazine, the public was given the impression that guests had to spend "two or three figures" on food and "a small fortune" on the rooms. Another rumor circulated that the chambermaids' keys were attached to strings of pearls around their waists. These reports scared away all except the wealthiest guests. Haan described media coverage of the hotel as a "positive injury" to business, saying that the reports were "frightening away millionaires". Nonetheless, the St. Regis was still a luxury hotel; access to the public rooms and the guestrooms was restricted to those who could pay.

William Rockefeller bought an adjacent mansion at 7 East 54th Street in October 1904. This purchase may have been intended to prevent a southward expansion of the St. Regis or to get the hotel's liquor license revoked. Early the next year, several of the hotel's opponents filed a lawsuit to request revocation of the St. Regis's liquor license; they claimed that, in his license application, Haan had provided false statements about the number of local residents who consented to the license. A state judge rejected the suit in April 1905, saying that the plaintiffs had to file a lawsuit individually. Opponents then requested that a state judge enjoin Astor from developing an annex to the hotel at 10 East 55th Street. A further amendment to the liquor law, exempting all hotels with over 200 rooms from having to obtain permission from nearby churches, failed in 1905 and again in 1907. An outdoor restaurant opened at the St. Regis in 1906. The outdoor restaurant, placed along a terrace facing Fifth Avenue, quickly became popular during dinners.

According to one critic, the hotel was specifically intended for those "who were rich, and who were or wanted to be fashionable, but [who wanted a hotel] which would also be somewhat quieter and more exclusive". The hotel was relatively close to many theaters and stores, but the immediate vicinity was still largely composed of private residences. Despite recurring reports about the hotel's exorbitant prices, the St. Regis's rates were no higher than those of similar upscale hotels in New York City. Many of the hotel's first patrons were upper-class but not ultra-wealthy. Town and Country reported in 1907 that many rooms were being rented at nightly rates of $5 to $10, while the more expensive suites rented for $14 to $20. By then, the hotel had become a popular venue for wealthy New Yorkers' dinner-dances, which had previously been hosted at the Delmonico's or Sherry's restaurants. In keeping with the St. Regis's upscale character, the hotel's operators trained the staff extensively and branded it as "The Best in America". According to the 1910 United States census, many of the hotel's permanent residents were families who had relocated from townhouses in Midtown and lived with one or two servants. The St. Regis's terrace restaurant was demolished after Fifth Avenue was widened in 1911, since the terrace protruded 14 ft (4.3 m) into the street.

==== Vincent Astor ownership ====
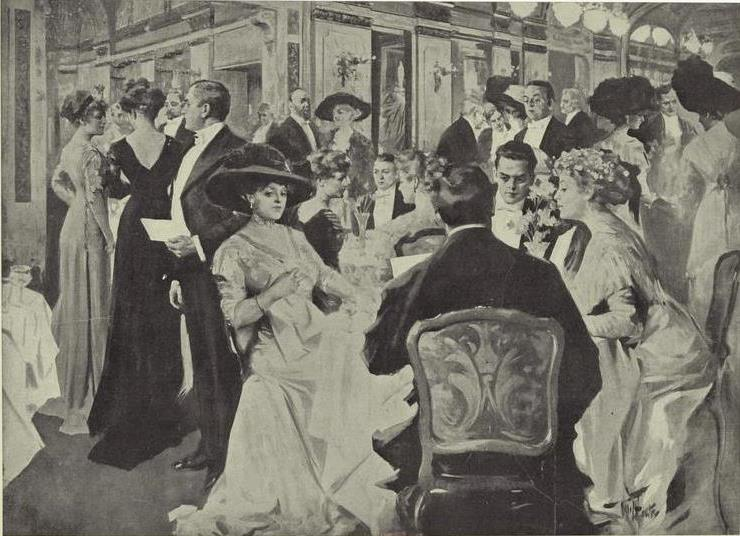
Dining room of the St. Regis, 1912

John Jacob Astor died when the RMS Titanic sank in 1912. His 20-year-old son Vincent Astor inherited $150 million of real estate, including the St. Regis Hotel, which had been valued at $2.675 million. That year, amid rumors that Vincent was planning to expand the St. Regis, William Rockefeller bought the house at 12 East 55th Street, immediately east of the hotel. Rockefeller already owned the houses at 3–9 East 54th Street, preventing Vincent from expanding the hotel to the south, and the hotel's other two sides faced the street. Haan announced in May 1921 that he would build an 18-story annex, with 150 rooms, to the east of the existing hotel, although this did not happen. Rockefeller's houses on 54th and 55th Streets, which had long prevented the hotel's expansion, were sold in 1924.

The residences on the adjacent blocks of Fifth Avenue had been replaced with stores by the mid-1920s. In July 1925, Vincent filed plans with the New York City Department of Buildings to construct six storefronts at ground level at a cost of $200,000. One of the storefronts would be placed in the ground-level dining room, and another storefront would be constructed within a structure that was used as an employee break room. C. A. Platt designed the alterations. Over the next several months, the storefronts were leased to such tenants as jeweler E. M. Gattle, haberdasher Joseph Holstein, and menswear firm William A. McLaughlin & Co. In May 1926, Vincent bought out the operating lease of Rudolph Haan, who had managed the hotel since it opened. Vincent then leased the hotel to Julius and William Manger of Manger Hotels, who announced that they would retain the hotel's existing staff and policies.

=== Duke ownership ===
Vincent sold the St. Regis to Benjamin Newton Duke's Durham Realty Corporation in February 1927. It was the only hotel in New York City that the Astor family still owned, as the family had previously sold off its other hotels. Architecture firm Sloan & Robertson immediately filed plans for an eastward annex to the hotel. Duke bought an adjacent row house at 12 East 55th Street the next month, extending the hotel's 55th Street frontage to 250 ft (76 m). Duke planned to add 317 rooms, nearly doubling the hotel's size to 615 rooms. A new dining room, grill room, and rooftop garden were also planned as part of the project. The work also included minor upgrades to the existing hotel, including elevators and bathrooms. Leddy & Moore Inc. was hired as the general contractor for the alterations in June 1927. To protect views from the annex, Duke leased Rockefeller's old row houses at 3–9 East 54th Street, for 63 years in October 1927.

The roof garden atop the annex opened in early June 1928, and the annex itself was completed on July 1, 1928. Prior to the opening of the annex, the St. Regis had never contained a roof garden. In January 1933, the Durham Realty Corporation transferred ownership of the hotel to the Hotel St. Regis Inc.; at the time, the hotel owed $1.2 million to various creditors. The hotel's resident manager, Eugene T. Hartigan, died the same year. The St. Regis Tropical Garden opened on the hotel's roof in November 1934. The bartender Fernand Petiot, who invented the Bloody Mary cocktail, started working at the hotel that year.

=== Re-acquisition by Astor ===
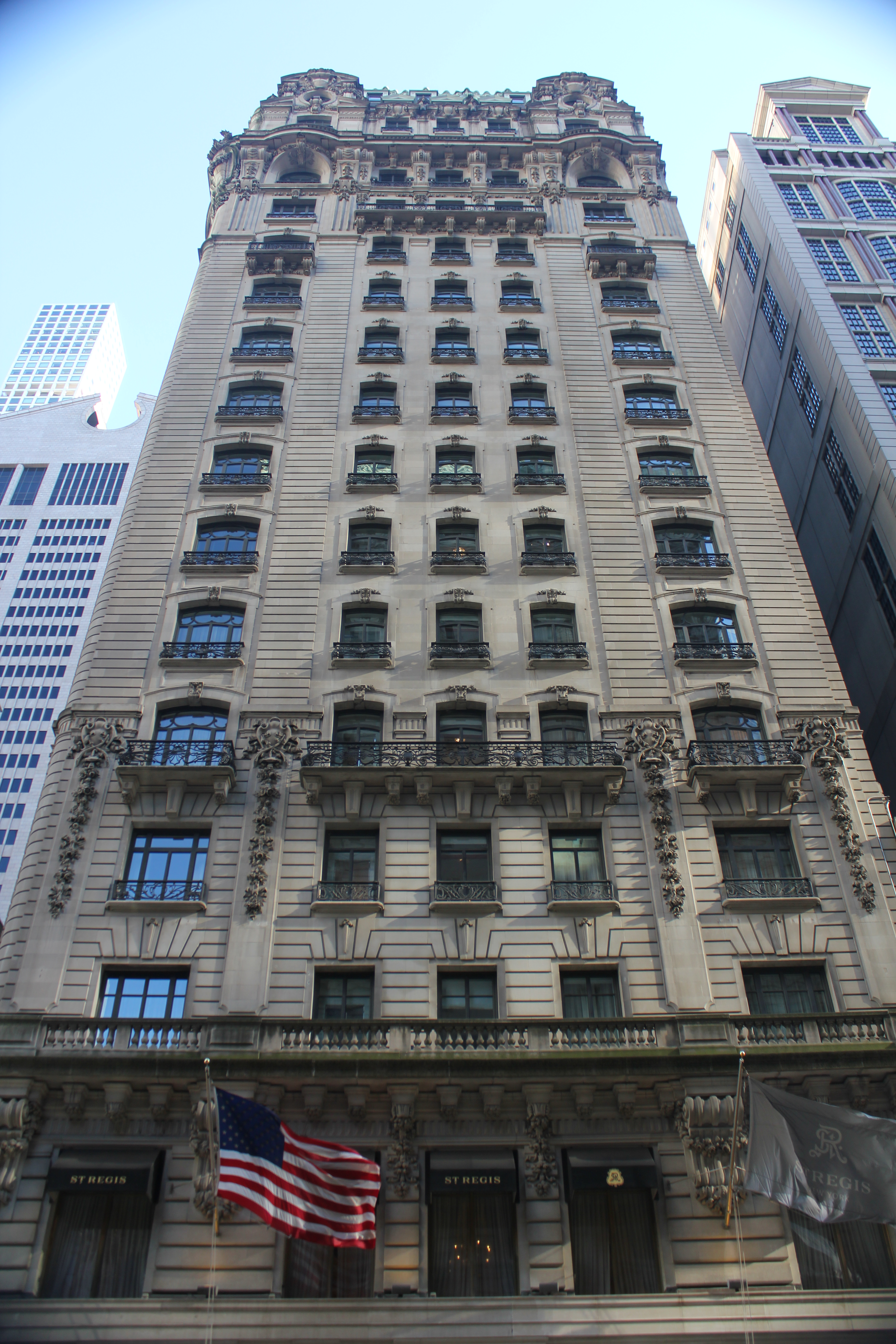
Fifth Avenue facade seen in 2022

Vincent Astor foreclosed on the hotel's $5 million mortgage in May 1934. Astor retained the right to buy the St. Regis's furniture for $100,000 if he foreclosed on the hotel. Accordingly, Astor sought and received a temporary injunction in early June 1934, preventing the Dukes from selling the furniture; a state court granted another injunction the same month. The dispute stemmed from the fact that the Dukes believed the furniture was severely undervalued. Raymond Moley was appointed as the receiver for the hotel shortly afterward. The Dukes sued Moley in July 1934, as they wanted him to pay $16,000 per month for the right to use the hotel's furniture. A state judge ruled that a foreclosure auction for the hotel could not be hosted until the disputes over the furniture were resolved. The New York Supreme Court ruled the next month that Moley had to pay rent for the furniture. The Supreme Court's Appellate Division ruled in December 1934 that Astor had the right to foreclose on the mortgage.

The Dukes and Astor agreed to a settlement in May 1935. The St. Regis would be brought out of receivership, and Vincent would pay Mary Duke Biddle $300,000 for the hotel's furniture. (Note: The furniture is equivalent to $7.04 million in 2025.) Astor paid $5.09 million for the hotel at a foreclosure auction on June 11, 1935. (Note: This is equivalent to $119.53 million in 2025.) The hotel's staff praised Moley for his work as the hotel's receiver, saying that he helped the St. Regis turn a net profit at a time when many hotels were operating at a loss. Vincent began remodeling the St. Regis, and he appointed James Otto Stack as the hotel's general manager in September 1935. The Maisonette Russe restaurant, modeled on an eponymous restaurant in Paris, opened within the St. Regis in October 1935, and the King Cole Room opened the same month. In part because of the repeal of Prohibition, the hotel's restaurant business increased by 300 percent between 1935 and 1937. Astor also installed air conditioning in more than 250 rooms, reusing the hotel's original ventilation ducts. The annex's roof garden reopened in May 1936 as a Viennese roof garden, and the King Cole Room became an event venue called the Iridium Room that October.

The renovations were completed in June 1937 at a cost of $500,000. Stack resigned as the hotel's general manager in 1938. Jewelry company Brand-Chatillon moved to the hotel in 1940, occupying the basement and parts of the first and second stories. The hotel's Iridium Room closed permanently in 1948. The Iridium Room's closure was attributed to federal excise taxes on live entertainment in hotels, as well as declining demand for live hotel entertainment. The annex's rooftop garden remained relatively popular through the late 1950s, but it was only open five days a week by 1959. At the time, it was the only remaining rooftop garden at a hotel in New York City. Serge Obolensky designed the La Boite nightclub in the hotel's basement; in the late 1950s, the nightclub frequently hosted Russian royals during Russian New Year celebrations.

=== Post-Astor period ===
Vincent Astor died in February 1959. Because he was the only person with access to the hotel's bank accounts, the hotel's assets were essentially frozen when Vincent died. The executors of his estate quickly filed his will for probate, allowing the executors to continue paying the hotel's expenses. William Zeckendorf of Webb and Knapp expressed interest in acquiring the St. Regis from Astor's estate. By early 1960, Zeckendorf had beat out more than twenty other bidders for the rights to the hotel. Zeckendorf and Obolensky, the latter of whom now worked at the Zeckendorf Corporation, agreed to buy the St. Regis that February for $14 million. (Note: This is equivalent to $152.36 million in 2025.) The buyers paid $5 million in cash and assumed a $9 million mortgage. In April 1960, Webb and Knapp agreed to sell the hotel building to the Kratter Corporation. Kratter took title to the hotel the next month and leased the St. Regis back to Webb and Knapp for 200 years. Webb and Knapp sold its leasehold that September to Mexican hotel mogul Cesar Balsa, who took over the hotel in December 1960.

The St. Regis had two restaurants at the time of Balsa's takeover: the Oak Room, open during the summer, and the King Cole Bar, open for lunch and dinner. The St. Regis still provided highly personalized service, and the hotel employed 700 staff members, more than one for each of the 600 rooms. The staff catered to a daily average of 500 guests; the kitchen alone employed 90 people. Twenty percent of guests at the time were from Europe. Balsa wished to make the hotel "like a private home", so he began giving flowers, scales, and hangers to female guests. Balsa began renovating the hotel again in early 1961, in advance of the 1964 New York World's Fair. Balsa restored the original ballroom, which had long been used as a brokerage office, and reopened it as the Versailles Ballroom. The project also involved refurbishing all of the rooms, as well as restoring old furniture that had been stored in the basement.

The Glickman Corporation (later the Franchard Corporation) acquired the St. Regis Hotel from the Kratter Corporation in July 1961 for $22 million; (Note: This is equivalent to $237.03 million in 2025.) this was the third time the hotel had been sold in less than two years. Balsa received a $1.2 million loan for the hotel the next year. Balsa bought the hotel's leasehold from the Kratter Corporation in April 1963 for $2.5 million. In November 1964, Balsa agreed to buy the building itself and the land under it from the Franchard Corporation for $6 million. Balsa outbid two other buyers who both wanted to demolish the hotel and replace it with an office building. Balsa resold the hotel in May 1965 to Wellington Associates, led by Sol Goldman and Alex DiLorenzo Jr., for between $14 million and $16 million. Wellington appointed Frank C. Bromber as the St. Regis's executive director.

=== Sheraton operation ===
==== 1960s to mid-1980s ====
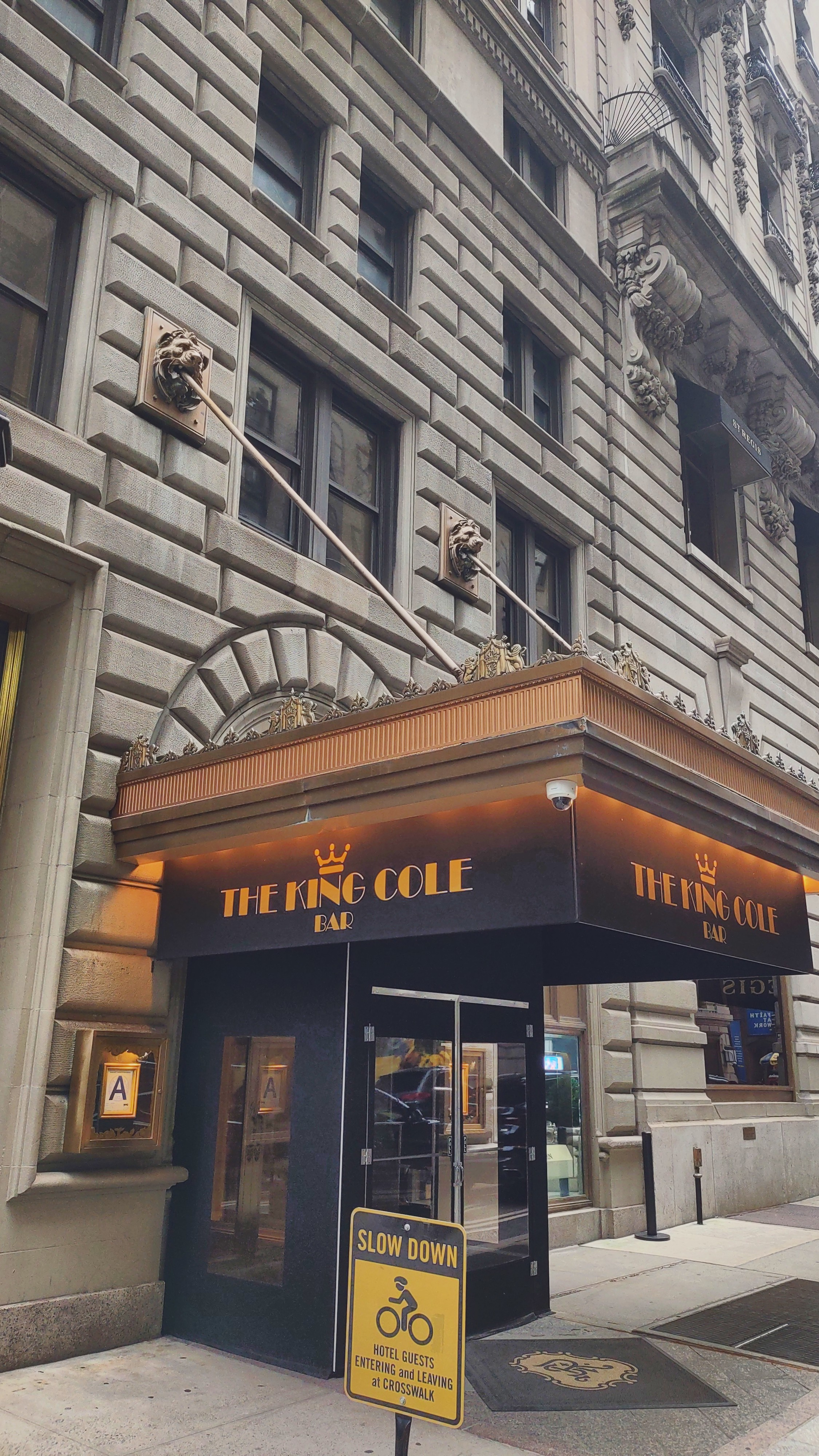
Entrance to the King Cole bar in the 55th Street annex

Sheraton Hotels leased the St. Regis from Wellington in February 1966. At the time, many old hotels in New York City were being demolished, including the Sheraton East (formerly Ambassador Hotel) on Park Avenue. However, a clause in Sheraton's lease prevented the chain from converting the hotel to offices or changing the hotel's character. The next month, the hotel became the St. Regis-Sheraton. Sheraton planned to renovate the hotel with French-style furnishings. The St. Regis-Sheraton's general manager, Charles Carey, relocated some of the Sheraton East's furnishings to the St. Regis. The chain reopened the roof garden in June 1966, renaming it the St. Regis-Sheraton Roof and Penthouse. By the end of 1967, Sheraton had spent over $1 million on renovations, including a restoration of the King Cole mural. La Cave du St. Regis, a small dining room for private parties, opened at the hotel in early 1968.

Sheraton completely remodeled the hotel in 1977. The project included the restoration of the dining room in the annex, which was rebranded as the Old King Cole Restaurant. In 1980, Equitable Holdings bought a 50 percent stake in the St. Regis-Sheraton. By then, the hotel's stature had declined, and it was being compared to cheaper hotels that served business guests, such as the Drake Swissotel, InterContinental New York, and the Parker Meridien. The St. Regis-Sheraton underwent a $25 million renovation in the early 1980s. The hotel's retail tenants in the 1980s included menswear shop Bijan (which replaced a Gucci store at the same location) and jeweler Fred. The St. Regis hosted many weddings during that decade; the number of weddings at the hotel increased by 35 percent from 1985 to 1988.

==== Late 1980s renovation and 1990s changes ====
At the beginning of June 1988, Sheraton announced that it would close the St. Regis's 521 rooms and 84 suites for renovations. The hotel closed on June 30, 1988; at the time, the renovation was expected to cost $50 million. Sheraton announced in October 1988 that it had bought out Equitable's ownership stake and that it would begin renovating the St. Regis. The hotel's closure prompted a dispute with Bijan, which refused to pay rent for several months because of the planned renovation. Architecture firm Brennan Beer Gorman Monk designed the renovation. The work included restoring the interior; adding a bar, cocktail lounge, and tea garden; and replacing mechanical systems. The King Cole restaurant was converted into the Lespinasse restaurant, operated by Gray Kunz, and the kitchen was overhauled for $1 million. In addition, mid-20th-century decor was removed, and the original plasterwork, marble floors, and chandeliers were restored. Most of the units were enlarged, so the average number of units on each story decreased from 16 to 10, but the facade remained intact and was restored.

The renovation was supposed to take 18 months, but the reopening date was postponed to late 1990, then to early 1991. Fashion house Dior opened a store at the base of the hotel in late 1990. The hotel reopened in September 1991 as The St. Regis. After the renovation, the hotel had about 360 units, including a suite themed to Tiffany & Co. The project's reported cost was over $100 million, although hospitality-industry experts estimated that the project actually cost twice that amount. The hotel industry in New York City was in decline at the time, but officials of Sheraton (which by then had been renamed ITT Sheraton) expressed optimism that the St. Regis would be profitable. The St. Regis's managers planned to cater to businesspeople, but they did not wish to host conventions. Room rates at the time ranged between $350 and $3,000; in exchange, guests received such amenities as a minibar, a health club, and butler service.

In January 1992, ITT Sheraton designated 28 of its premier hotels as the ITT Sheraton Luxury Collection, with the St. Regis in New York as the division's flagship. The hotel's Lespinasse restaurant remained popular through the 1990s. Starwood acquired Sheraton from ITT Corporation in 1997 and decided to create the St. Regis Hotels & Resorts luxury hotel chain, with the New York City hotel as the chain's flagship. The New York hotel was renamed The St. Regis New York to differentiate it from the numerous other St. Regis hotels in the new chain. The other St. Regis hotels provided butler service for all guests, similar to the New York hotel. Starwood appointed Richard Cotter as the St. Regis New York's managing director, in which capacity he served until 2001.

==== Early 21st century ====
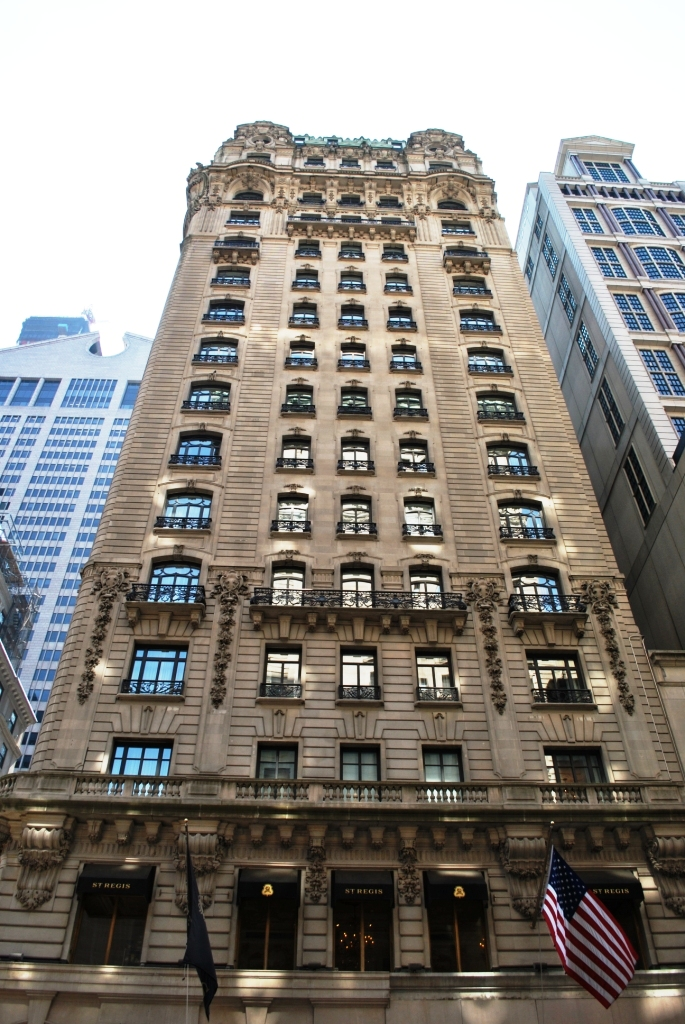
Seen in 2005

At the beginning of the 21st century, the average guest was in their late 50s, and four-fifths of guests were American. The hotel's marketing director said in 2000 that, in part because of the hotel's butler service, 65 percent of guests were repeat visitors. In addition, the hotel employed 600 staff members, almost twice the 315 guests that stayed at the hotel on an average night. The Lespinasse restaurant at the St. Regis closed in 2003, and a large De Beers store opened in the hotel the next year. By 2005, there were plans to convert 59 rooms into up to 33 condominium apartments, which would be rented to guests seasonally and occupied by their owners at other times. St. Regis Hotels and Resorts started offering the full-ownership condominiums for $1.5 million to $7 million at the end of 2005, and it started selling memberships for the timeshare condominiums in February 2006. Additionally, to celebrate the hotel's centennial, Stephen Sills and James Huniford renovated all of the guestrooms, redecorating the units with new furniture. The hotel's 8th to 11th floors reopened as the St. Regis Residences in 2006. Alain Ducasse opened the Adour restaurant at the St. Regis in 2008, but the restaurant closed after four years.

The St. Regis New York added two designer suites in the early 2010s: the Dior Suite in 2011 and the Bentley Suite in 2012. The entire hotel was renovated in 2013 at a cost of $90 million. The work, designed by HDC Design and Stonehill Taylor Architects, involved restoring all hotel rooms and most public spaces, and it added a new restaurant and gym. In addition, the little-used Astor Court was converted into the King Cole Bar and Salon. The hotel catered to a younger and more diverse clientele; about half of the guests were foreign nationals, and the median guest was 45 years old. Most of the work was completed in October 2013, but the spa and health club were not finished until early 2014. The St. Regis New York's operators ran a yearlong advertising campaign, "Introducing a New Era of Glamour", to advertise the renovated hotel. Meanwhile, Richemont had bought the hotel's ground-level retail condominium in 2012 for $380 million. Vornado Realty Trust and Crown Acquisitions bought the retail condominium, as well as the adjacent house at 697 Fifth Avenue, in 2014 for $700 million.

The St. Regis New York launched a luxury car service in 2015, with two cars manufactured by Bentley, and the hotel began lending guests Amazon Kindles with titles from the hotel's library. In May 2016, news media reported that Starwood was in talks with the Qatar Investment Authority to sell the St. Regis New York, along with the St. Regis San Francisco, for up to $1 billion. (Note: The QIA bought the San Francisco property in December 2016.) Marriott International acquired Starwood the same year, including the St. Regis New York. In November 2019, the QIA bought the St. Regis New York for $310 million. Under the agreement, Marriott would lease the St. Regis from the QIA and would continue to operate the hotel. The hotel was temporarily closed to the public in 2020 due to the COVID-19 pandemic in New York City, and the space was instead used by hospital patients who were not undergoing critical care. The St. Regis began offering a "champagne butler" service in 2024, and the King Cole Bar was renovated from January to September 2024.

== Architecture ==
The 18-story French Beaux-Arts style hotel, the tallest in the city when completed, was designed by Trowbridge & Livingston, with interiors by Arnold Constable & Company. Trowbridge & Livingston's original structure occupies the corner of Fifth Avenue and 55th Street. Sloan & Robertson designed the hotel's eastern annex on 55th Street, which was completed in 1927. The Thompson–Starrett Company was the general contractor, and John H. Shipway & Bros. was responsible for the marble work.

=== Facade ===
The facade of the original hotel is made of limestone and is divided vertically into five bays on Fifth Avenue and ten bays on 55th Street. Similar to other Beaux-Arts buildings, the facade is divided into three horizontal sections similar to the components of a column, namely a base, shaft, and capital. When the hotel was built in the early 1900s, New York City construction codes forbade developers from placing any decorative elements outside their property's lot line. Additionally, the hotel's developers wished to maximize the amount of interior space by placing the facade as close to the lot line as possible. The corner of Fifth Avenue and 55th Street is curved, similar to at 689 Fifth Avenue just to the south. Sloan and Robertson's annex on 55th Street is similarly divided into three horizontal sections.

According to Architecture magazine, Trowbridge & Livingston had "a great deal of freedom in designing the ornament". The hotel's decorations were heavily inspired by natural forms, although the St. Regis's facade contains custom balusters, consoles, keystones, and other ornaments. The ornamentation is concentrated at selected locations throughout the facade; at the time of construction, the facade could only be seen from a distance or from immediately outside the hotel. The largest windows are placed on the lower stories, which contained the largest suites in the hotel. Most of the hotel's windows are of the same design, with two movable casements topped by a transom. The outermost bays contain more ornate windows, which consist of sidelights on either side of each casement, as well as curving brackets and ovals in each transom.

==== Original hotel ====
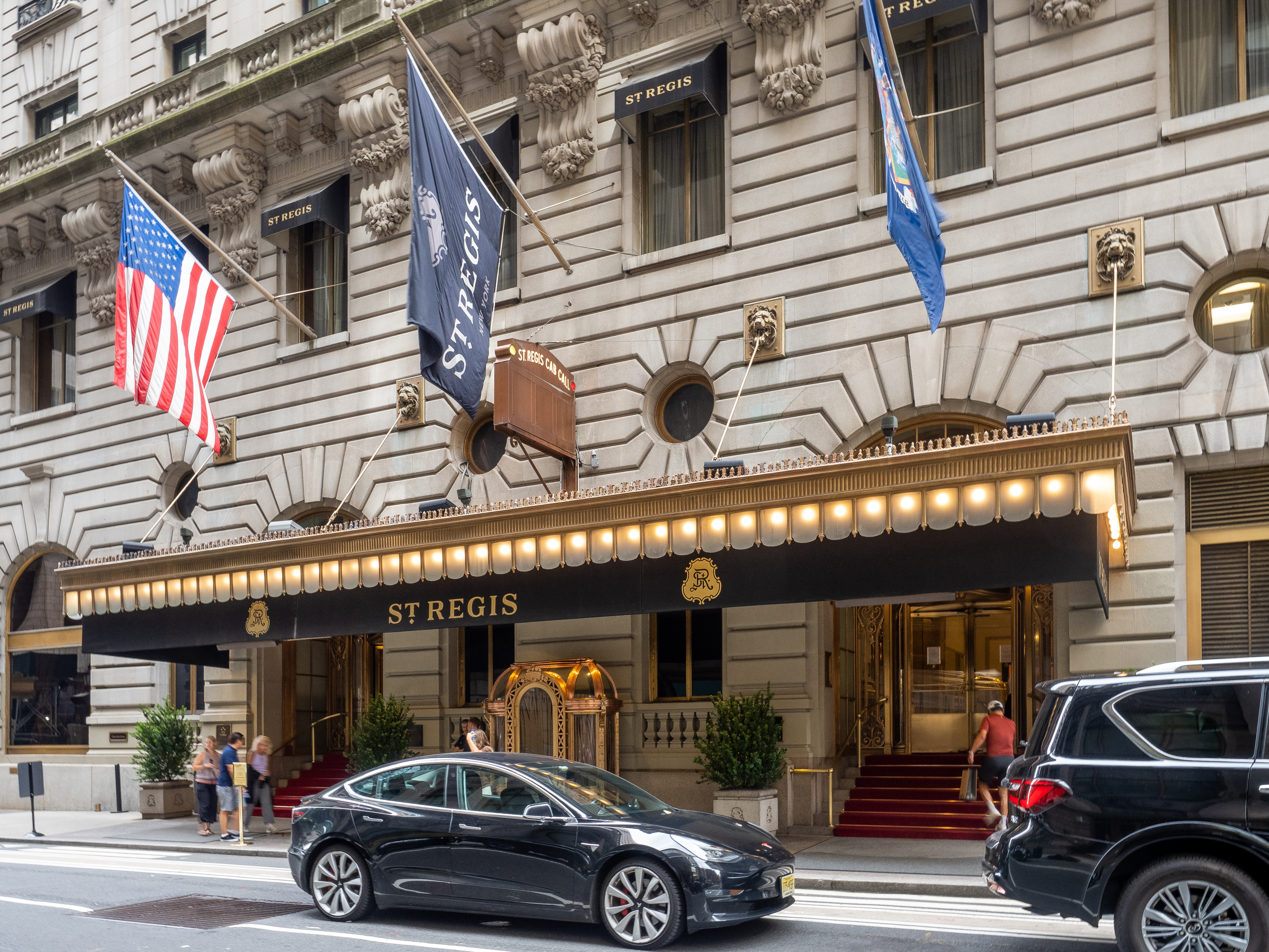
Main entrance to the St. Regis on East 55th Street

The base consists of the ground through 5th stories. The lowest two stories are clad with deeply rusticated masonry blocks. The 55th Street elevation was constructed with three arched entrance portals with glass and metal doors; two of the portals remain. The portals originally contained revolving doors with bronze baldachinos. Between the two remaining entrance portals is an elliptical, brass-and-copper doorman's booth with curved windows and a rounded door; it is sometimes described as a "sentry box". The remainder of the ground story contains round-arched windows, while the 2nd story contains rectangular windows. Above the 2nd story are large console brackets ornamented with garlands.

Still within the base, the 3rd story contains a balcony, which wraps across the Fifth Avenue and 55th Street elevations. Above the 3rd story, the facade is clad in rusticated blocks that extend to three-fourths of the height of the 5th-story windows; a horizontal band course runs above the rusticated portions of the facade. The 3rd and 4th stories contain a rusticated facade and square-headed windows, and the 4th story also includes balconettes with ornate iron railings. The 5th story contains segmentally arched windows, as well as projecting balconies with iron railings. Each bay is separated by large garlands and contains its own balconies on the 4th and 5th stories, except for the three middle bays on Fifth Avenue, which have no garlands and a shared balcony.

The original facade's central section comprises the 6th through 12th stories. There are segmentally arched windows in each bay, which contain balconettes with iron railings; the windows are surrounded by moldings and topped by keystones. The center bays on these stories are clad in smooth stone. The two outer bays on the Fifth Avenue and 55th Street elevations are flanked by rusticated piers; this was done to "limit and define the design", according to Architecture magazine. The thirteenth story is designed as a "transitional story", with square-headed windows in each bay, as well as ornate pilasters flanking the outer bays. The eight center windows on 55th Street, and the three center windows on Fifth Avenue, each share a balcony with an iron railing, which is supported by brackets.

The top section rises above the 13th story. The 14th story contains segmentally arched windows, which are flanked by console brackets. These brackets support a balcony with a balustrade, which curves slightly outward in the outermost bays. This balcony visually separates the roof from the lower stories. Trowbridge & Livingston chose to use a balcony instead of a cornice, as they believed that a cornice would be visually jarring. On the 15th and 16th stories, the windows in each bay are connected to each other. In the outermost bays, there are smooth pilasters on either side of the 15th- and 16th-story windows, as well as a broken pediment above the 16th story. The other bays contain paneled pilasters and rounded pediments. The mansard roof, which is made of slate and copper, encompasses the 17th and 18th stories. On the 17th story, the outermost bays contain oval windows, flanked by brackets that support a rounded pediment. The center bays contain simple eared frames and triangular pediments; there are urns with garlands between each of the center bays. The 18th story originally contained oval windows with frames; on the Fifth Avenue elevation, all except one of these windows has been replaced with a simple dormer window. Above the 18th story, the mansard roof contains a copper crest with shell designs.

==== 55th Street annex ====
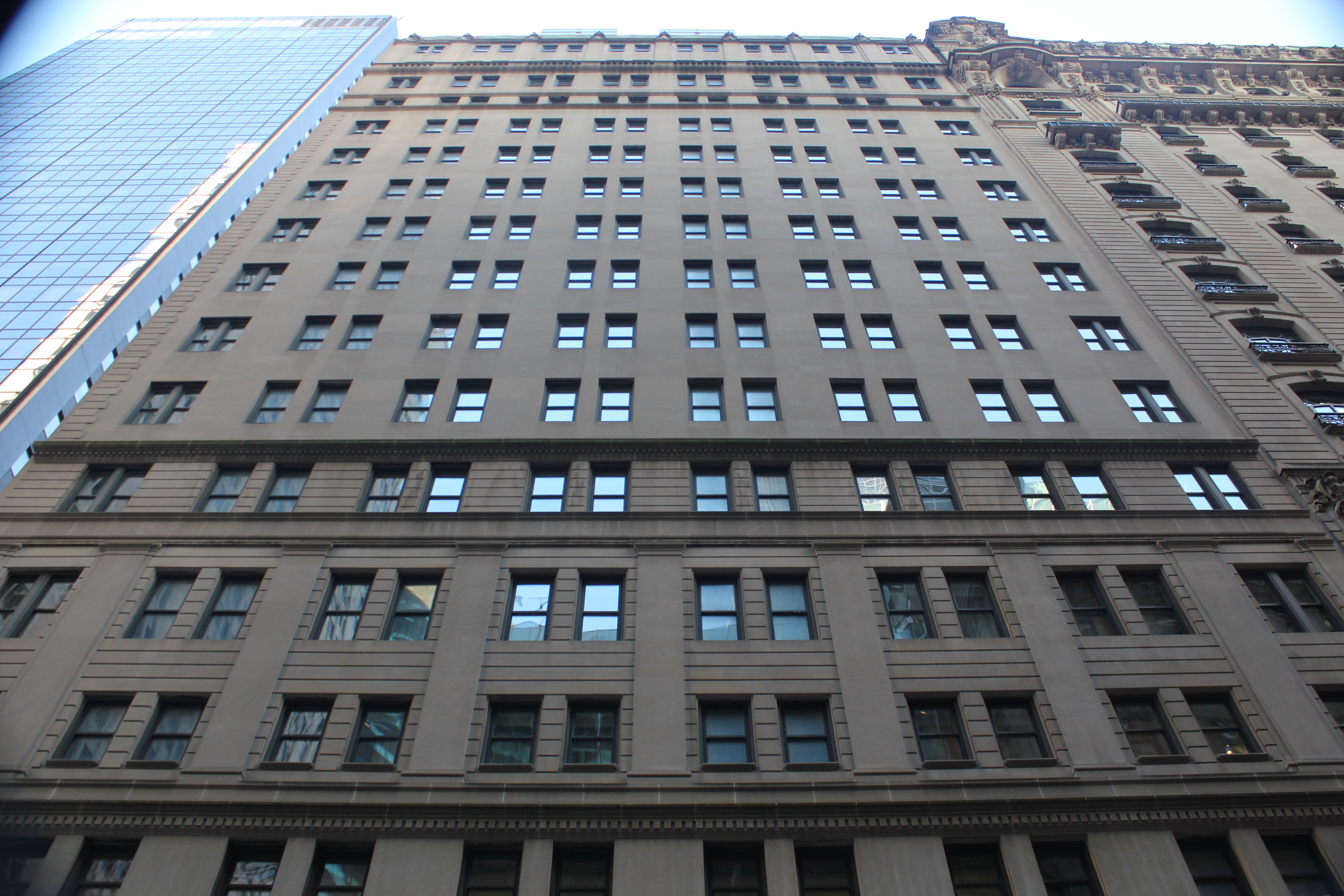
55th Street annex

The annex on 55th Street contains a limestone facade similar to that of the original hotel. The facade of the annex lacks ornamentation and has recessed rectangular windows. The ground story, first mezzanine, and second story contain deeply rusticated blocks, above which is a simple molding. The annex's 2nd mezzanine corresponds to the cornice above the original hotel's second story. There is a projecting band course above the 2nd mezzanine, which corresponds to the balcony above the original 2nd story. The annex's 3rd to 5th stories are clad with lightly rusticated limestone and serve as a transitional section for the facade, similar to in the original hotel. On the 3rd and 4th stories, each bay is flanked by smooth double-height pilasters. (Note: Landmarks Preservation Commission 1988, p. 7, describes the annex's first mezzanine as the 2nd story and the annex's second mezzanine as the 4th story. As a result, the third through 16th stories of the annex are respectively characterized as the fifth through 18th stories.)

The annex's central section comprises the 6th through 12th stories and is clad in smooth stone. The 13th story of the annex is rusticated and contains band courses both below and above it. The annex's 14th story has a simple design and is topped by a cornice with a balustrade. On the 15th and 16th stories of the annex, each bay is flanked by double-height pilasters; in addition, there is a parapet with urns above the 15th story. The top two stories of the annex are within a double-height mansard window. The annex's eastern elevation is made of buff brick and contains rectangular windows.

Placed atop the annex was a roof garden, designed by Joseph Urban. The roof garden was redesigned in 1936 as a Viennese-style roof garden, with a ballroom painted pink, gold, and gray. There was also a dance floor with an ice-skating platform underneath. By the 1990s, the ballroom on the roof was known as the St. Regis Roof.

=== Structural and mechanical features ===
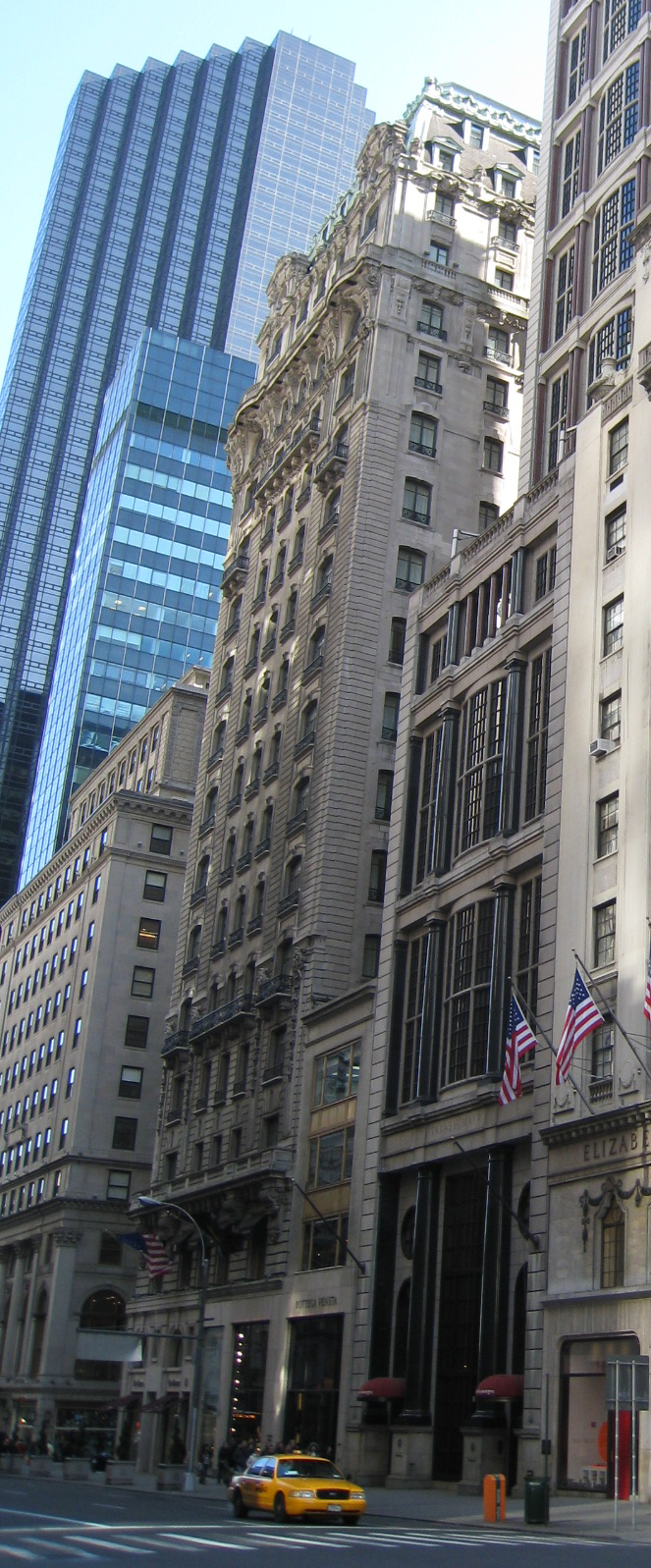
The narrow Fifth Avenue facade of the St. Regis

The St. Regis required a large amount of mechanical equipment, which was spread across three basement levels because of the relatively small site. When the hotel opened, a team of 36 engineers maintained its mechanical systems; the engineering team had a bathhouse in the subbasement.

As designed, the hotel contained both an indirect heating system and a forced-ventilation system. There were fresh-air intakes on the southern elevation of the facade at the 3rd, 7th, and 12th stories. These stories contained chambers where the fresh air was filtered, warmed by steam coils, and moistened. Electric blowers in each chamber supplied fresh air to four or five stories each. Additional filters, coils, and electric fans were placed in the third basement, supplying air to the other basements and the first three above-ground stories. Dirty air was exhausted through chimney flues in each room and collected at the top of the building, where large exhaust fans discharged the air. This obviated the need for guests to open their windows to exhaust dirty air. Each room and corridor had its own thermostat. There was also a pneumatic vacuum cleaning system, with ten ducts on each floor, which blew dust into the basement. Ventilation openings and air intakes were concealed behind ornamental panels or bronze decorations.

Otis Elevator manufactured the elevators, and Hecla Iron Works created grilles for the elevators. There were two passenger elevators, as well as a service elevator, which provided access to a pantry in each apartment. According to a contemporary New York Times article, the service elevators could deliver food from the basement kitchen to the top story within 90 seconds. Two more elevators were added in the early 1990s, serving the second floor and the roof. Each room contained an electric clock; they were synchronized with a master clock in the basement, which in turn received the exact time once a day from Western Union. This was a novel feature when the St. Regis opened, as there was no standard timekeeping in New York City at the time. The basement also had a large wine cellar, and the hotel also included numerous mail chutes.

The hotel's kitchen, on the second basement, was decorated with marble floors, tiled walls, and white marble tables. The kitchen alone cost $200,000 in 1904 dollars, while the refrigerating plant cost another $50,000. (Note: The kitchen is equivalent to $7.167 million, and the refrigeration plant is equivalent to $1.792 million in 2025.) This kitchen, covering 1,400 ft^{2} (130 m^{2}), was restored in the early 1990s.

Because of the presence of massive column-free spaces on the lower stories, the hotel building's steel framework contains large girders and trusses. The foundations extend 40 ft (12 m) deep to the underlying bedrock. To protect the hotel from fires, the contractors used large amounts of concrete and steel, in addition to marble, bronze, and wire glass. The fireproofing material was manufactured by the Roebling Company.

=== Interior ===
When the St. Regis opened, the interior was extensively decorated in marble and bronze. Marble was used extensively in the corridors on each story; in the trim around the doors; and on all stairways, including those to the basement. John Jacob Astor had opted to use French marble in the St. Regis because he considered Italian marble to be too common a material. The hotel also used large amounts of fireproof wood, which was used for some decorative moldings, in contrast to many buildings of the time. The doors to each guestroom were made of white or red mahogany or Circassian walnut. The public rooms were paneled in imported English oak and illuminated by massive chandeliers. The sash windows and window frames were made of metal.

Generally, exposed floor surfaces were made of tile or marble, except in some of the suites on the second and third floors. The bedrooms had cement floors covered with carpets. Many of the interior spaces had white-tile wainscoting, while elevator cabs and balustrades were made of bronze.

==== Public rooms ====
===== First floor =====
The first floor contained a lobby, restaurant, café, palm court, and hotel office; all were decorated with ornate marble paneling. The public rooms' ornate materials compensated for their small size compared with New York City's other luxury hotels. The restaurant occupied the western side of the ground floor and could fit 350 people. A large mirror, evoking the Hall of Mirrors at Versailles, gave the appearance that the restaurant was larger than it actually was. The palm court was placed at the center of the southern side and was furnished in a Persian style, with Turkish tapestries. The palm court also contained six murals by Robert V. V. Sewell, depicting the story of Cupid and Psyche; the central panel measured 19 by 8.5 ft (5.8 by 2.6 m), while the others measured 13 by 7.5 ft (4.0 by 2.3 m). The palm court also contained three stained-glass skylights, supported by marble arches. At the southeast corner of the ground story was a café. There was a private reception room at the northeast corner. The original dining room was closed in 1925, when six storefronts were constructed along Fifth Avenue.

The 1928 annex contained a main dining room and a ballroom at ground level, as well as storefronts on 55th Street. The annex also included a large entrance to a grill room in the basement. In the early 1990s, three new public rooms were created. These included a restaurant named Lespinasse, decorated in white and gold; the Astor Court, a double-height tea room; and Le Petit Salon, a large lounge.

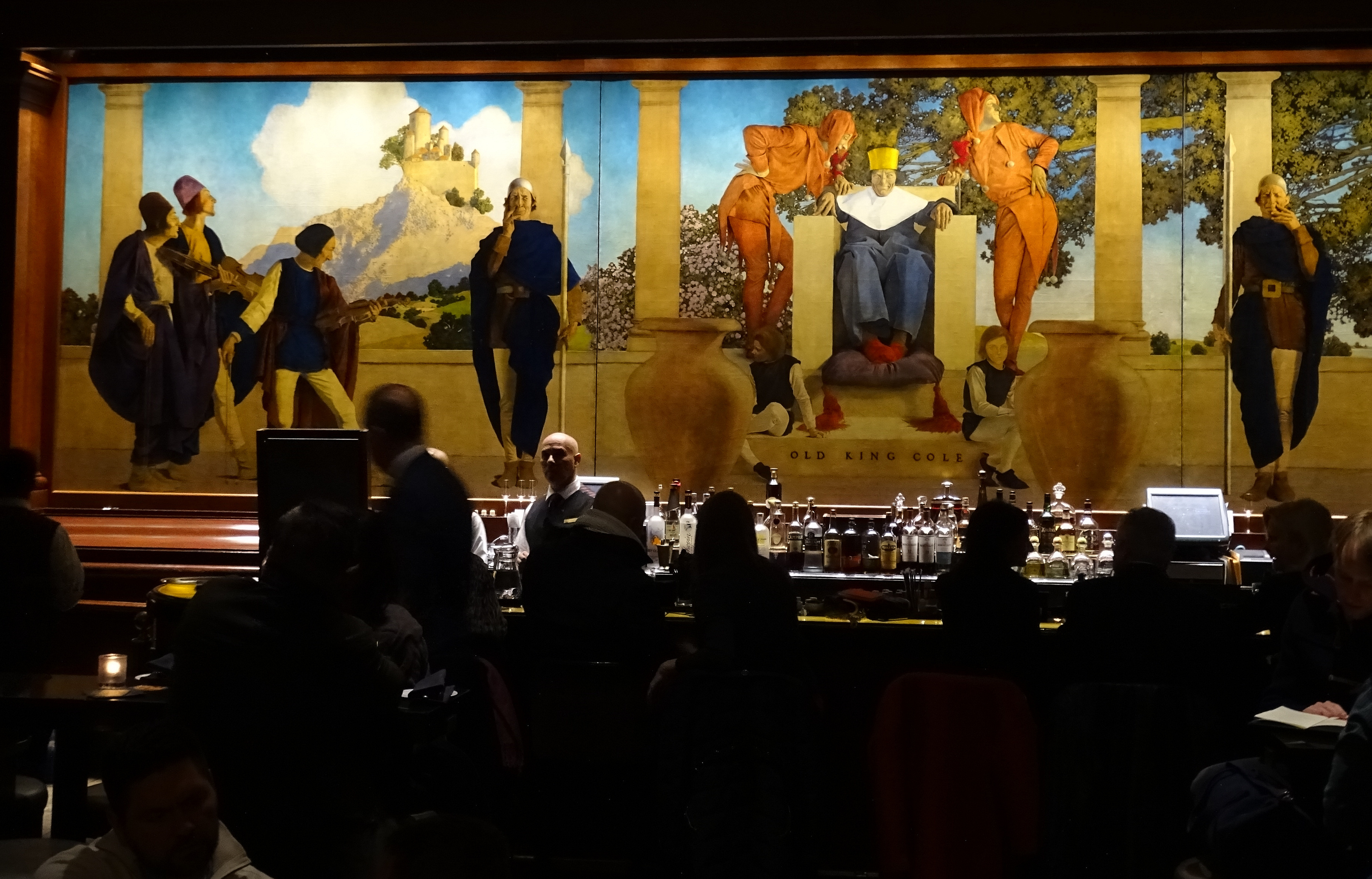
The King Cole Bar, seen in 2016

The King Cole Room was constructed at ground level in 1935. The bar contained the iconic "Old King Cole" painting by Maxfield Parrish, originally created for the Knickerbocker Hotel; the painting was hung on the north wall of the King Cole Room. The painting was restored in 1957 and again in 2007. The space itself is a wood-paneled room adjacent to the lobby; the Old King Cole mural is placed on one wall. As of 2013, the King Cole Bar was part of the King Cole Bar and Salon, which occupies part of the old Astor Court.

===== Second floor =====
On the second floor, the Fifth Avenue frontage was occupied by a banquet hall and ballroom. The banquet hall could fit 150 people. The ballroom had marble-paneled walls and ornate yellow-and-white velvet tapestries; it was known as the Versailles Ballroom by 1962.

A library occupied the north side of the second level; it was originally staffed by its own librarian. The library could fit 2,150 or 3,000 books, with titles cataloged and selected by publishing firm Charles Scribner's Sons. It was frequented by many of the same literary personalities that patronized the King Cole Room. Also on the north side of the second story were two reception rooms; one of the reception rooms was paneled in mahogany, while the other was decorated with oak paneling. In the early 1990s, the library and reception rooms became a business center. A private dining room suite with three rooms was on the southeast corner of the same floor.

==== Guestrooms ====
The St. Regis originally had 350 units starting at the third floor. The St. Regis was originally planned as an apartment hotel, with apartments that contained as many as 15 to 20 rooms; there were to be nine apartments per floor. Plans for the large apartments were scrapped before the hotel opened, and the interior was divided into suites with up to three rooms. Excluding the first and second floors, the furnishings were originally planned to cost $700,000. (Note: This is equivalent to $26.05 million in 2025.) It reportedly cost between $1,500 and $3,000 to furnish each of the rooms. (Note: This is equivalent to between $53,750.00 and $107,500.00 in 2025.) Each salon originally contained a Steinway grand piano, and there were 47 such pianos in the hotel. All units had large bathrooms and closets, and every bedroom had an attached bathroom. Many of the most popular rooms were furnished with 16th-century European tapestries. When the annex opened in 1928, it had 200 suites, each consisting of two rooms.

The third through 16th floors were devoted to rooms and suites. On the third floor was the state apartment (or state suite), which faced Fifth Avenue. Designed in the Louis XV style, the state apartment included two bedrooms, a bathroom, a dining room, sitting room, library, and reception room. The state apartment's main bedroom cost $8,000 to furnish, while the other five rooms cost $25,000. (Note: The main bedroom is equivalent to $297,692, and the other five rooms are equivalent to $930,288 in 2025.) Each suite had an antechamber and drawing room, and some of the suites also had private dining room. Smaller units contained a fireplace, closet, desk, and other furnishings arranged in an open plan. Three units on each floor faced an interior light court, while the remaining units faced the street. The rooms at the southwest, northwest, and northeast corners of the original hotel were generally the largest on each floor, measuring 17 by 20 ft (5.2 by 6.1 m) each. Each guestroom floor was served by its own waiter; by 1962, the Ritz Hotel in Boston was the only other hotel in the U.S. that provided such a service.

After the 1990s renovation, the hotel had approximately 360 units, compared with more than 550 before the renovation. The average room spanned 450 ft^{2} (42 m^{2}). Each of the renovated rooms contained a multilingual computer system and three phones. The rooms had replicas of Louis XVI-style and Louis XV-style furniture. The bathrooms were decorated in gray marble and had European bathtubs. Since 2006, the 8th through 11th floors have operated as a set of condominiums known as the St. Regis Residences. The residences consist of 24 full-ownership condos and 22 fractional-ownership timeshare condos, a part of "The Residence Club". Memberships for the fractional-ownership condos are sold in 28-day increments; members are only required to use their condo for seven days, and the condo could be rented out for the remaining time.

===== Branded suites =====
The modern hotel contains several branded suites created in partnership with Tiffany & Co., Dior, and Bentley. The Tiffany Suite, which was created in the late 20th century, measures 1,700 ft^{2} (160 m^{2}) and contains Tiffany Blue decorations. It includes an entrance foyer; a living room with a fireplace; a dining room; a bedroom; and two bathrooms. The Dior Suite, completed in 2011, also covers 1,700 square feet and replaces an earlier Dior suite that opened in 1991. The current Dior Suite includes gray-and-cream Louis XVI style furnishings, spread across a dining room, a bedroom, and one-and-a-half bathrooms. The Bentley Suite on the 15th floor was completed in 2012 and contains wooden and leather furnishings, as well as items depicting the luxury carmaker's products. It includes an entrance foyer; a living room; a dining room; a bedroom; and one-and-a-half bathrooms.

Another branded suite, themed to the film Chevalier, opened at the St. Regis in May 2023. It is decorated with 18th-century Parisian memorabilia inspired by the film, as well as artwork from the film.

== Notable people and events ==
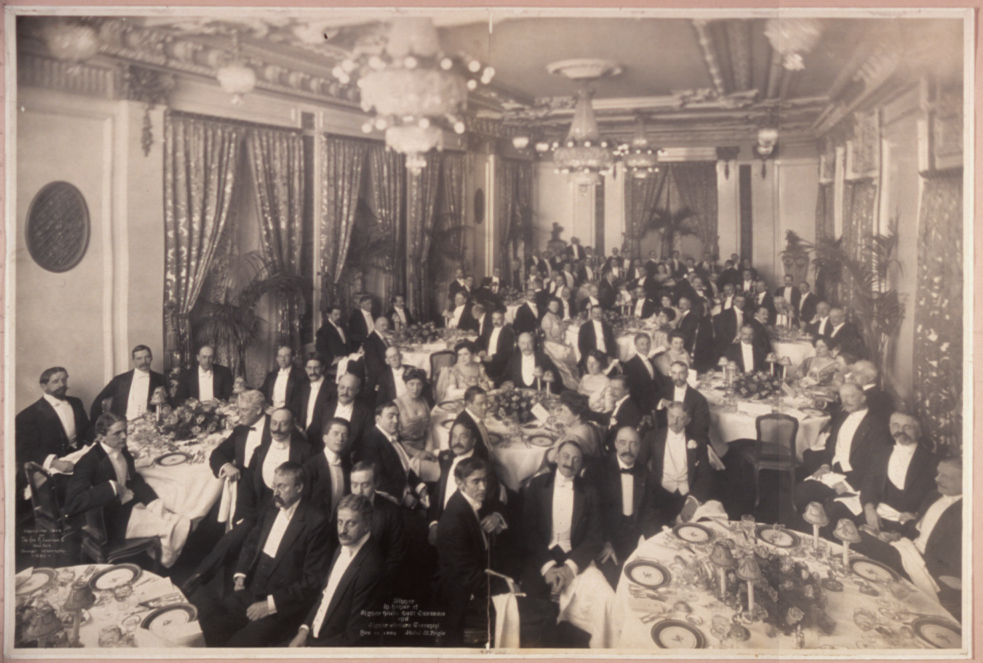
Banquet in honor of Arturo Toscanini at the St. Regis, 1908

Among the earliest events at the St. Regis Hotel was a 1904 banquet for Japanese Prince Fushimi Sadanaru, as well as a dinner dance in honor of then-U.S. president Theodore Roosevelt's niece Corinne Robinson. The King Cole Room hosted literary personalities such as Michael Arlen, Lucius Beebe, John McClain, and Quentin Reynolds. By the 1960s, the hotel was frequented by film and theatrical personalities such as Marlene Dietrich, Mary Martin, Joan Fontaine, Leland Hayward, Rex Harrison, and Alfred Hitchcock, as well as Marilyn Monroe. Guests also included noble families and heads of state, such as former Belgian king Leopold III and his wife Lilian; Italian countess Marina Cicogna; and former Swiss president Max Petitpierre. In addition, it hosted "society regulars" such as the Astor, Gould, and Whitney families. In the 1980s, The Globe and Mail said the hotel had hosted "every U.S. president since its opening".

The hotel has had a number of permanent residents. The hotel's residents in the early 20th century included mining magnate Daniel Guggenheim and inventor Nikola Tesla. Regulars at the St. Regis's residents in the 1960s included television executive William Paley and his wife Babe, as well as O. O. McIntyre's wife. The artist Salvador Dalí and his wife Gala lived at the hotel every fall and winter from 1966 to 1973. In addition, by the 1970s, the hotel's guests included Gerald Ford, Bob Hope, Elizabeth Taylor, and several American astronauts. John Lennon recorded a demo of "Happy Xmas (War Is Over)" in his room.

The St. Regis Roof has hosted performers such as the Count Basie Orchestra and Edie Adams. The New York Times wrote in 1967: "A sure sign that summer has arrived in the city, socially at least, is the opening of the St. Regis-Sheraton Roof." In addition, the St. Regis New York first served Abrau-Durso's Nazdorovya champagne during détente in 1975, the first Soviet champagne exported to the United States.

== Impact ==
=== Critical reception ===
==== Contemporary reviews ====
When the hotel opened, the New-York Tribune wrote: "In spite of the luxury everywhere, the handsome tapestries, the great bronze doors and marble mantels, the hotel does not seem gaudy or garish." The New York Times wrote that "one has but to enter the place to be impressed with its magnificence", while The Washington Post called the St. Regis an "admirable hotel, admirably situated". The Atlanta Constitution said the St. Regis "establishes a new and higher standard for the construction and decoration of hotels in a city that, in this department of building, establishes the standard for the whole country".

A month after the hotel opened, W. F. Dix of Town and Country magazine wrote that the St. Regis was "an extraordinary token of the wealth, good taste and prosperity of the nation". American architect George W. Maher was critical of the design, saying "it destroys Americanism in the Americans who stop there", but Russian writer Maxim Gorky said that "neither the Grand Dukes, nor even the Czar, have anything like this".

==== Later reviews ====
The St. Regis remained popular in the late 20th century. In 1962, Irene Corbally Kuhn wrote for Town and Country: "When hotels everywhere are going in for plastic longevity and jealously measuring every foot of space for its commercial return, the St. Regis is still selling elegance." Upon the hotel's 60th anniversary in 1964, the Times wrote that the hotel was known as the "grand dame of East 55th Street". After the 1991 renovation, a Times critic wrote, "On the one hand, there is sure-handed preservation of what has always had something of the quality of a grand Parisian apartment building. [...] On the other hand, late-20th-century technology is quietly ubiquitous." The Times also described the King Cole Bar as among the "Parises and Romes of hotel bars". A writer for the Montreal Gazette wrote: "Maxfield Parrish's King Cole mural in the bar looks fresher than ever; and the Watteau rooms on the second floor are worth a snoop." A reporter for USA Today called the first floor "an explosion of marble" and said that "even the little things at the St. Regis are high class".

Describing the hotel's service, Terry Trucco of the Times wrote in 1991 that the St. Regis was, "in short, a wonderful blend of landmark preservation and late-20th-century technology, with dozens of delightful details. Among the best: the St. Regis initials embossed on every door knob, brass window handle and carved on every air vent." A Wall Street Journal critic wrote in 2000 that "the St. Regis positively gleams with marble, gilt and crystal" and that the "heavily international clientele has an elegant look, but when enough of the elite set pack in, the popular lobby lounge can be uncomfortable, noisy and smoky." Similarly, USA Today wrote in 2003: "A hipster's palace this isn't. Some might even call it stuffy." Another Times critic said: "It struck me that for people of a certain age, and I am one, it is an exquisite representation of grand hotels imagined as a child."

Architectural writer Christopher Gray said the St. Regis was "opulent, even showy" when compared with the neighboring Gotham (now Peninsula) Hotel. The Times said the St. Regis and Gotham hotels, along with the University Club Building, "formed the core of a new elegant precinct of Fifth Avenue before the building of the Plaza Hotel to the north and Rockefeller Center to the south". The hotel ranked 16th among 150 buildings in the American Institute of Architects' 2007 survey List of America's Favorite Architecture.

=== Landmark designations ===
The New York City Landmarks Preservation Commission (LPC) had considered designating the St. Regis Hotel as an official city landmark in 1966. The LPC again considered designating the St. Regis as a landmark in 1985. Although Sheraton did not express an opinion on whether the hotel should be landmarked, the LPC designated the St. Regis as a New York City landmark on November 1, 1988. During that decade, preservationists had proposed designating the St. Regis as a contributing property to a planned historic district along the midtown section of Fifth Avenue. The historic district was never created.

== See also ==
- List of hotels in New York City
- List of New York City Designated Landmarks in Manhattan from 14th to 59th Streets
