= Cesar Balsa =

Hotelier and restaurateur (1923–2007)

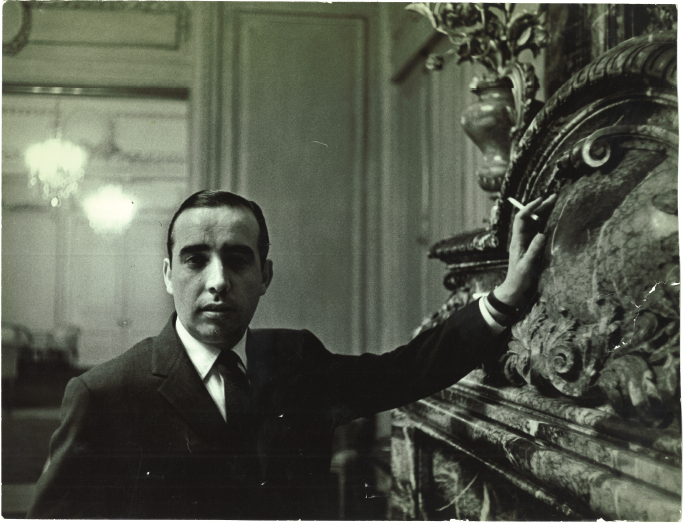
Balsa at The St. Regis Hotel in New York City, New York, United States

Cesar Balsa (1923–2007) was a Spanish-born hotelier and restaurateur who worked in the hotel and restaurant industry in Mexico in the 1950s and 1960s.

== Early life and early career ==
He was the only child of Elisa Carralero and Antonio Balsa, a Spanish barber.

At the age of twelve he started his career as a bellhop at a Spanish hotel. Over the course of ten years, he worked his way up to restaurant management and hotel operation, and at age 21 was appointed General Manager of Food and Beverage Services at the Palace Hotel in Madrid.

== Emigration to Mexico and later career ==
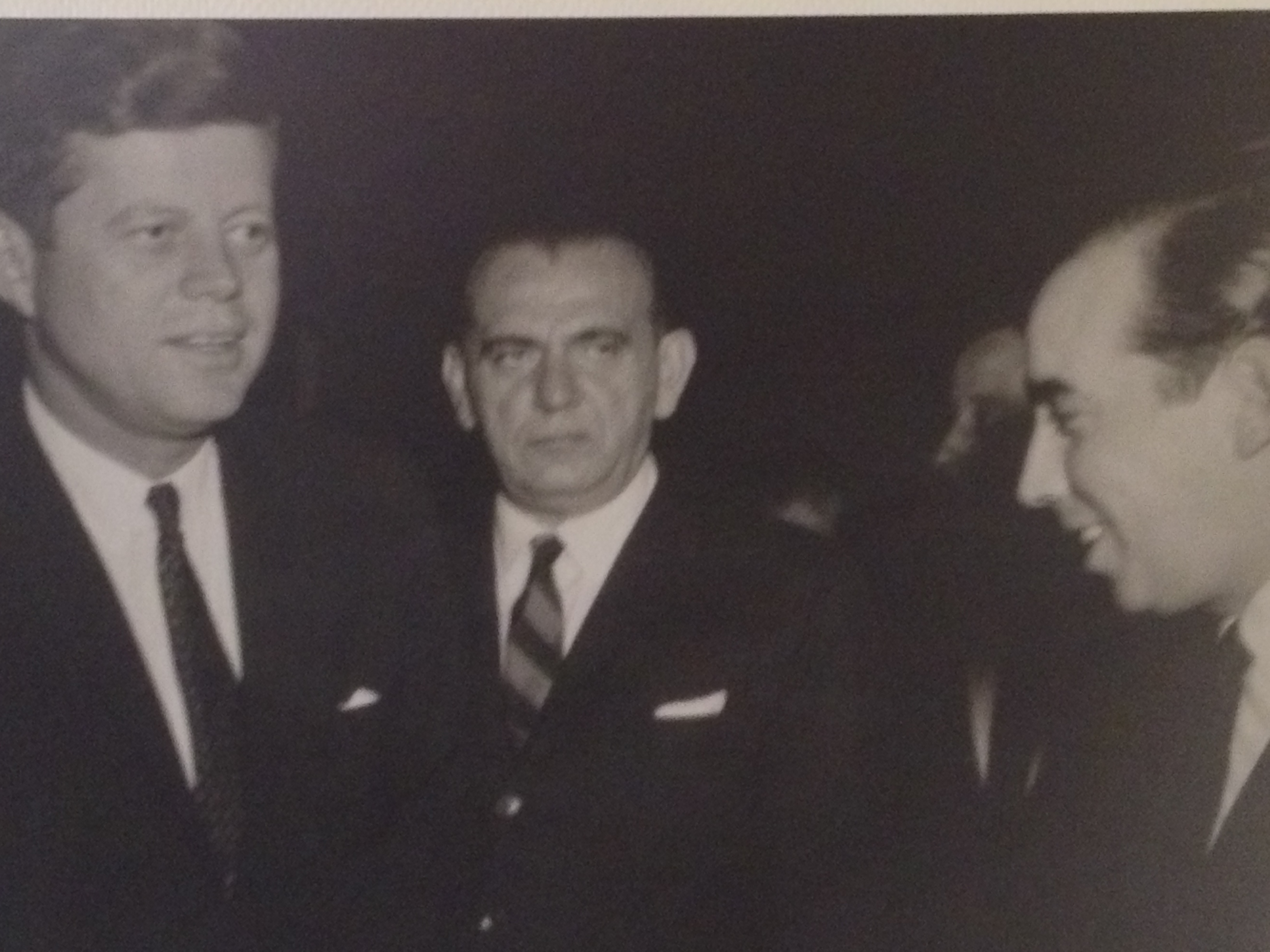
U.S. President John F. Kennedy is greeted by Balsa in Mexico City, Mexico

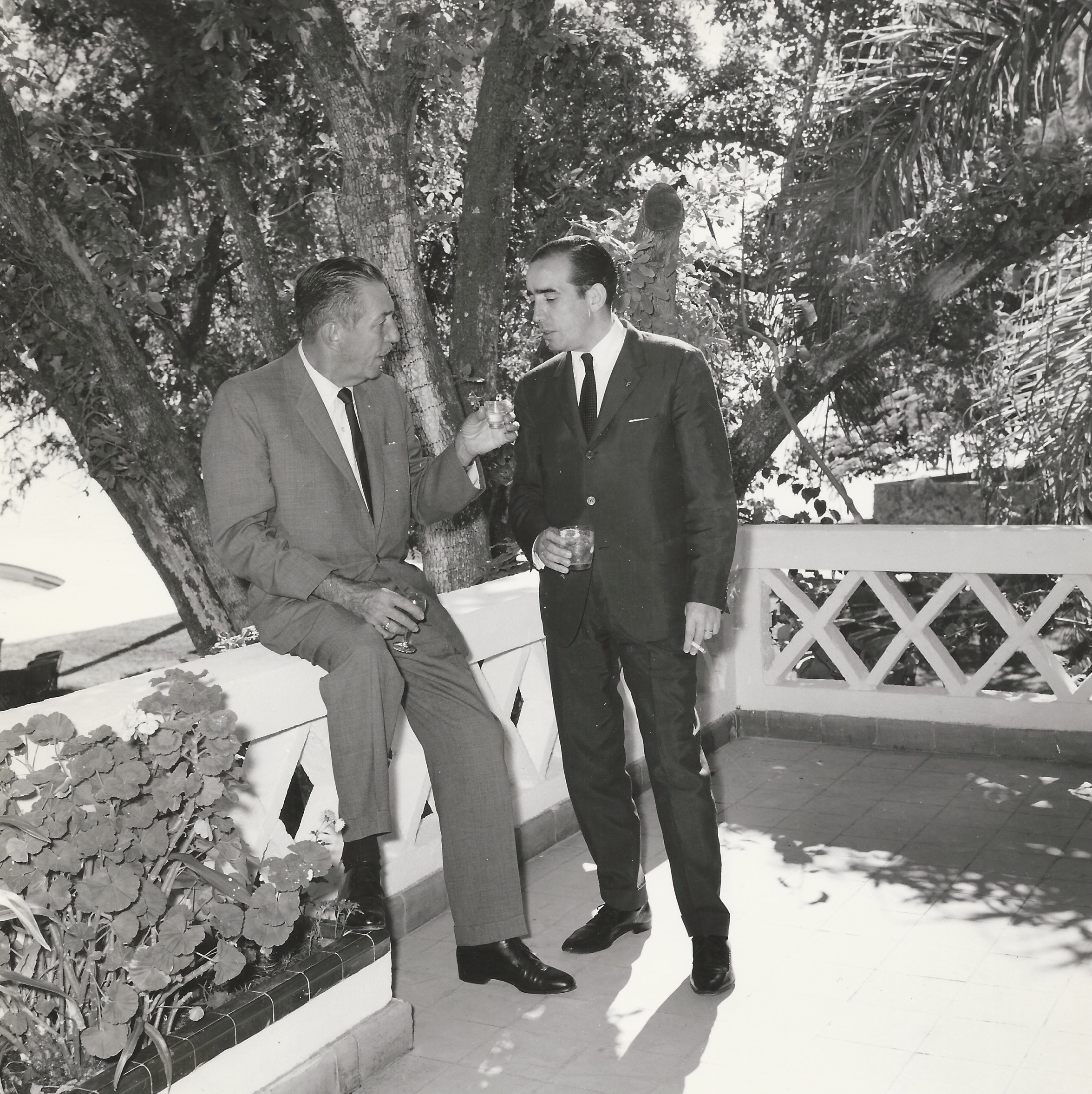
Balsa with Walt Disney in Chapala, Jalisco, Mexico

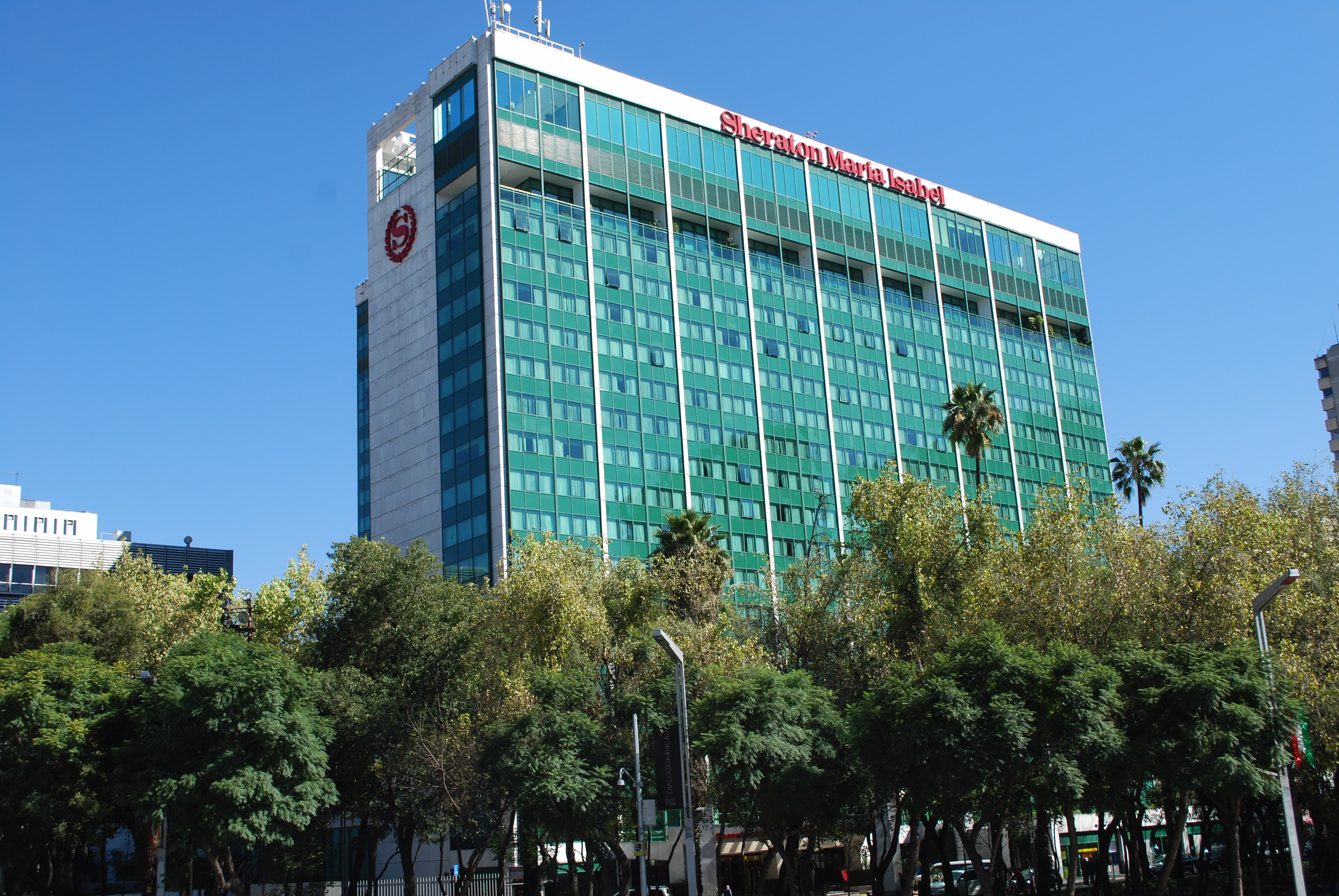
Sheraton Maria Isabel Hotel and Towers, Mexico City, Mexico

In 1948, he emigrated to Mexico City, Mexico, and went on to become the head of the hotel and restaurant conglomerate Nacional Hotelera S.A., which included The Presidente Hotel chain in Mexico. Among them, the first air-conditioned luxury hotel in Acapulco and Cozumel, as well as several popular restaurants and night clubs such as Can-Can and Focolare, in Zona Rosa.

In 1958, Balsa signed a contract to operate the Prado-Alfer Hotel in Mexico City; in 1960, he acquired the Hotel Del Prado, then the largest hotel in Mexico. When he took over the Hotel De Prado, the dining room had a 1946–1947 mural, Sueño de una Tarde Dominical en la Alameda Central (Dream of a Sunday Afternoon in the Alameda Central), by Diego Rivera. The mural, twenty meters long and seven meters high, was hidden by columns, so he moved it to the middle of the lobby, where it could be seen.

In 1960, Balsa bought the operating lease to the St. Regis Hotel in New York City, New York. He bought the hotel's leasehold in 1963, and then the building itself and the land in 1964. Balsa sold the hotel to Sheraton in 1966.

In April 1963, Balsa signed a partnership and management contract with Antenor Patiño to operate the newly built 600-room Maria Isabel Hotel (now known as the Sheraton Mexico City Maria Isabel Hotel) in Mexico City, at the time the largest hotel in Latin America. In November that year Sheraton and Balsa Hotels signed a collaboration agreement in which Sheraton would represent Balsa Hotels in the United States and Balsa would represent Sheraton in Mexico.

International ventures included the Hotel Villa Magna in Madrid.

Together with ARA Inc., Balsa handled the catering for the 1968 Summer Olympics in Mexico City, serving 10,000 athletes and 30,000 meals a day.

In 1963, he became president of the Mexican Association of Hotels and Motels.

== Legacy ==
The Secretariat of Tourism and the Sociedad Mexicana de Geografía y Estadística grant a medal every year that bears his name to recognise those who excel in the tourism industry.

== See also ==
- List of people from Madrid
- List of Mexicans
