= Sheraton Mexico City Maria Isabel Hotel =

Hotel in Mexico City, Mexico

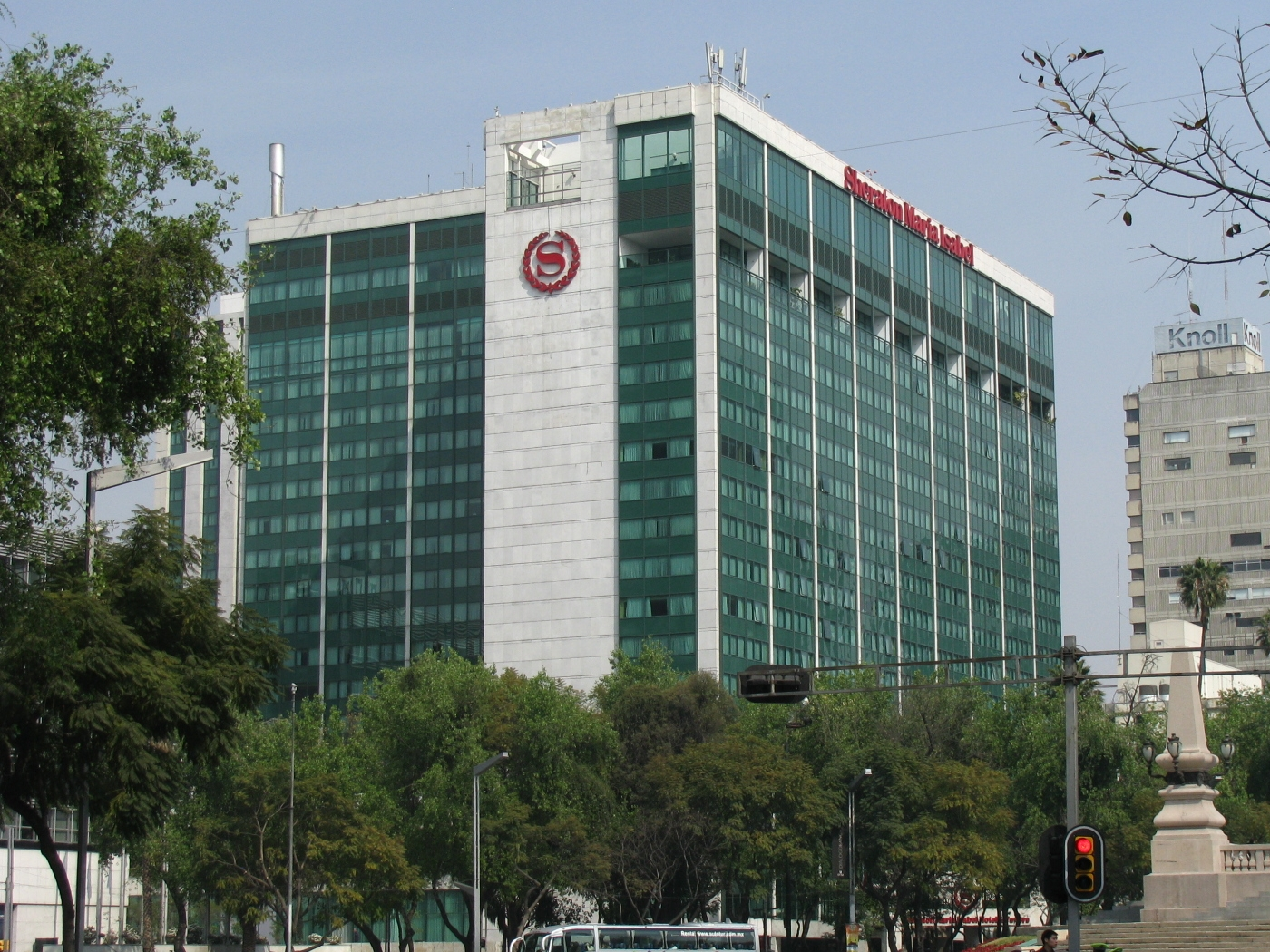
- Sheraton Maria Isabel Hotel and Towers
- Interactive map of the Sheraton Mexico City Maria Isabel Hotel area
- Hotel chain: Sheraton Hotels

General information
- Location: Mexico City, Mexico, Paseo de la Reforma 325
- Coordinates: 19.427964781746056°N 99.16719455783547°W
- Opening: 1962
- Management: Sheraton Hotels

Other information
- Number of rooms: 755

Sheraton Mexico City Maria Isabel Hotel
- Interactive map of the Sheraton Mexico City Maria Isabel Hotel area

Design and construction
- Architects: Main building, 1962 : Juan Sordo Madaleno and his team of architects Second tower, 1969: Manuel De Santiago-de Borbón González Bravo

The Sheraton Mexico City Maria Isabel Hotel is a business hotel operated by Sheraton Hotels and Resorts and located on Paseo de la Reforma in the Zona Rosa business and shopping district just across from El Ángel de la Independencia in Mexico City.

== History ==
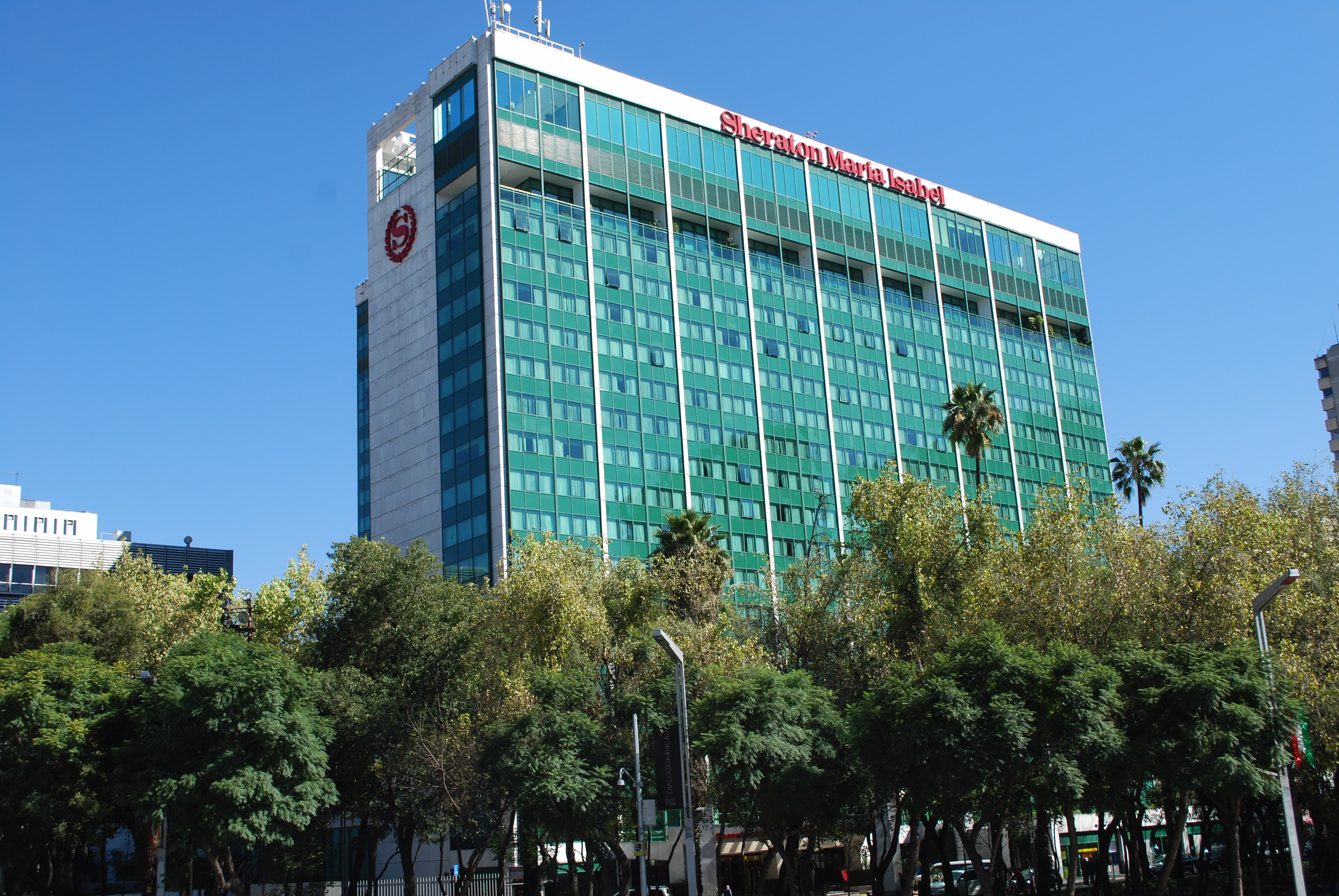
Sheraton Maria Isabel Hotel

The Maria Isabel Hotel was built in 1962 by Bolivian tycoon Antenor Patiño. He named the hotel after his late daughter, Maria Isabel Patiño de Goldsmith, who died in 1954, at the age of 17, from complications in the seventh month of pregnancy, after eloping with 20-year-old British heir James Goldsmith. The hotel was designed by renowned Mexican architect Juan Sordo Madaleno, working with architects José Villagrán García, Ricardo Legorreta, and José Adolfo Wiechers. In April 1963, the Maria Isabel was taken over by Mexican hotel magnate Cesar Balsa's Balsa Hotels. In November 1963, Balsa Hotels became represented by Sheraton Hotels in the US.

In 1969, the Maria Isabel was sold to Sheraton. They renamed it the Maria Isabel-Sheraton Hotel and added a new rear tower, designed by Mexican architect Manuel de Santiago de la Torre, increasing the number of rooms from 502 to 747. The hotel was later renamed the Sheraton Maria Isabel Hotel and Towers.

== Controversy and Incidents ==
On March 18, 1981, at around 8:30 PM, a fire began inside the 17th floor of the hotel building, completely burning that floor, with the flames burning much of the next floor (18th floor), and of the floor below (16th floor), also hitting some of the floors above.

The Mexican Red Cross with local hospitald Mexico City sent out 26 ambulances to treat injured guests. 10 fire trucks were also sent out to take out the fire, with 50 firefighters. Most guests on floors below were evacuated, while Hotel Staff worked with emergency responders. Some guests above and near the fire were stuck due to bellowing smoke, which caused stairs and passageways to be blocked. After the fire reportedly began, at 10:09 PM, all floors that had flames (including the engulfed 17th floor) were fully burnt out. This let responders head up to the floors and evacuate all guests who were stuck from above the 15th floor, plus assisting guests who had injuries, mostly coming from burns and inhaling of toxic fumes.

After a full investigation, the Mexican Res Cross reported that 3 people had died from their injuries while being stuck in the hotel. They were identified as Mexico City firefighter Juan Manuel Cruz Carmona, aged 23, bellboy Francisco Galvan Trejo, and Victor Daniel Gonzalez, a Mexican guest at the hotel, aged 30. It was unknown what caused fully caused the ignition of the fire, but reports given indicated it was caused by both a short circuit plus paint that was used during a refurbishment of the 17th floor.

On February 4, 2006, this hotel was involved in an international incident when a group of Cuban delegates were expelled from the hotel upon pressure from the United States Department of Commerce to enforce the embargo against Cuba. This act, however, is in violation of the 1996 Law of Protection of Commerce and Investments from Foreign Policies that Contravene International Law that prohibits companies that are located in Mexico from blocking commerce and investments that are caused by the application of foreign laws.

Hotel Sheraton released a statement, on February 8, denying discrimination based on national origin. They also mentioned that the rooms were booked and paid for by an American company it could not possibly have kept any funds and send them to the government of the United States.

The unit of the government of Mexico responsible for the protection of consumers, the Procuraduría Federal del Consumidor (Profeco), declared it is unable to close the hotel because such measure is only applicable on repeated violations. However, it has estimated a fine for the hotel for up to a million pesos (roughly 96,000 dollars) but none of the Cuban officials had presented a complaint.

After this incident, a written complaint of zoning violations was presented to the borough delegate, Virginia Jaramillo of the Party of the Democratic Revolution, of Cuauhtémoc, D.F., the borough of Federal District (D.F.) where the hotel is located. After a revision it was found that the hotel was in violation of zoning regulations because of 3,000 unauthorized square meters and lack of parking spaces. After this revision the borough delegate of Cuauhtémoc declared the closing of this establishment to be imminent. Other violations such as lack of restaurant menus in braille may be corrected by the deadline given by the delegate, but Jaramillo explains it is impossible to destroy part of the building or to build more parking spaces before that time.

== See also ==
- List of hotels in Mexico
- List of companies of Mexico
