= Protection of Trading Interests Act 1980 =

Act of the Parliament of the United Kingdom

Protection of Trading Interests Act 1980 (Note: Section 6(1).)
- Act of Parliament
- Parliament of the United Kingdom
- Long title: An Act to provide protection from requirements, prohibitions and judgments imposed or given under the laws of countries outside the United Kingdom and affecting the trading or other interests of persons in the United Kingdom.
- Citation: 1980 c. 11
- Territorial extent: United Kingdom (Note: Section 6(7).)

Dates
- Royal assent: 20 March 1980
- Commencement: 20 March 1980 (Note: Section 4(b) of the Interpretation Act 1978.)

Other legislation
- Amends: Criminal Law Act 1977
- Repeals/revokes: Shipping Contracts and Commercial Documents Act 1964
- Amended by: Magistrates' Courts Act 1980; Civil Jurisdiction and Judgments Act 1982; Statute Law (Repeals) Act 1993

Status: Amended

Text of statute as originally enacted

Revised text of statute as amended

Text of the Protection of Trading Interests Act 1980 as in force today (including any amendments) within the United Kingdom, from legislation.gov.uk.

The Protection of Trading Interests Act 1980 (c. 11) is an act of the Parliament of the United Kingdom to counter American assertions of extraterritorial jurisdiction.

Introducing the bill in the House of Commons, the Secretary of State for Trade, John Nott, claimed that its purpose was "to reassert and reinforce the defences of the United Kingdom" against attempts by the United States "to enforce their economic and commercial policies unilaterally on us" by "the most objectionable method" of "the extra-territorial application of domestic law".

The act gives the Secretary of State for Trade the authority to "give to any person in the United Kingdom who carries on business there such directions for prohibiting compliance" with laws of a foreign state which control or regulate international trade in a way which damages British trading interests.

The act also prohibits British corporations from giving documentation to a potentially hostile foreign interest and empowers British courts to seize the assets of any overseas power which impounded assets of British corporations.

The act restricts the enforceability of judgments for multiple damages. Section 5 provides that British courts will not enforce a judgment for "an amount arrived at by doubling, trebling or otherwise multiplying a sum assessed as compensation".
