= Foreign Extraterritorial Measures Act =

Act of the Parliament of Canada

Parliament of Canada
- Long title: An Act to authorize the making of orders relating to the production of records and the giving of information for the purposes of proceedings in foreign tribunals, relating to measures of foreign states or foreign tribunals affecting international trade or commerce and in respect of the recognition and enforcement in Canada of certain foreign judgments.
- Citation: Foreign Extraterritorial Measures Act, R.S.C. 1985, c. F-29
- Enacted by: Parliament of Canada
- Assented to: December 20, 1984
- Commenced: February 14, 1985
- Bill citation: Bill C-14
- Introduced by: Mark MacGuigan
- Status: In force

The Foreign Extraterritorial Measures Act (French: Loi sur les mesures extraterritoriales étrangères) is a statute of Canada. The Act was enacted by the Canadian Parliament in 1984 and became effective February 14, 1985, in an attempt to block the extraterritorial application of United States anti-Cuba laws to Canadian corporations. The term Canadian corporation includes Canadian subsidiaries and branches of U.S. companies.

== Intent ==
The general intent of the Act was to preclude the implementation of US law, as it relates to restrictions on trade with Cuba, to businesses in Canada. After passage of the US Act, The Cuban Liberty and Democratic Solidarity (Libertad) Act of 1996 (Helms–Burton Act, Pub.L. 104–114, 110 Stat. 785, 22 U.S.C. §§ 6021–6091) further changes to the Act were approved effective January 1, 1997.

== Orders ==
Orders implementing this Act include:

1. The Foreign Extraterritorial Measures (United States) Order (1990) dated October 31, 1990 (SOR/90-751)
2. The Foreign Extraterritorial Measures (United States) Order (1992) (SOR/92-584)
3. The Foreign Extraterritorial Measures (United States) Order (1996) (SOR/96-84)
