= Transphobia in the United States =

Prejudice against Americans of other gender identity than assigned at birth

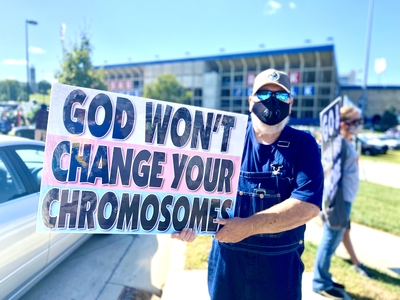
Member of the Westboro Baptist Church protesting against transgender people in October 2020

Transphobia in the United States has changed over time. Understanding and acceptance of transgender people have both decreased and increased during the last few decades depending on the details of the issues which have been facing the public.

The 2020s saw the emergence of an anti-LGBTQ movement, closely associated with Trumpism. This movement places particular emphasis on opposing transgender rights. Targeting of transgender people has escalated under the second Trump administration. As a result, there are few federal protections left for transgender Americans. President Donald Trump's executive orders have rolled back protections. Some orders even erase the legal existence of transgender people. State, local, and other governmental bodies in the United States have enacted anti-transgender legislation. Social issues in the United States also reveal a level of transphobia. Because of transphobia, transgender people in the U.S. face increased levels of violence and intimidation.

== American viewpoints on transgender people ==
A February 2025 Pew Research Center survey found that 66% of U.S. adults favored requiring transgender athletes to compete on teams matching their sex assigned at birth and 56% favored banning gender-transition medical care for minors, while 56% favored laws protecting transgender people from discrimination in jobs, housing and public spaces; support for the restrictions had risen since 2022 and support for anti-discrimination protections had fallen. An AP VoteCast survey of more than 120,000 voters in the 2024 election found that "more than half of voters said support for transgender rights in government and society has gone too far." A 2023 poll found that a slight majority of Americans opposed legislation restricting transgender rights. A 2021 Gallup poll found that 62% of Americans believed that transgender people should only play sports on teams that match their gender assigned at birth, and that support for openly transgender people serving in the military had fallen from 71% to 66% since 2019. Data published in 2024 showed that 80% of Americans supported LGB people living as they choose and 67% supported the same for transgender people. Gender nonconforming people often face discrimination, shaming, or other types of gender policing in their daily lives.

Many professional sports leagues in the United States allow transgender players to participate with various types of guidelines and inclusion levels. The Connecticut Interscholastic Athletic Conference allows transgender students to compete according to their gender identities.

Native Americans in the US often use different terminology to describe their non-binary gender identities based on their cultural values. Two-Spirit is used in some cultures, and the Navajo have nádleehé. The Ojibwe, Potawatomi, and Zuni Pueblo, also have specific terms for individuals who present outside of the gender binary.

=== Government protections ===
Historically, transgender individuals and communities in the US have been marginalized and received few legal protections. Attempts to protect LGBT people legally in the US workplace has been tried unsuccessfully since 1994 with the Employment Non-Discrimination Act (ENDA). However, individual court cases, such as Price Waterhouse v. Hopkins, prohibit discrimination of employees "based on their perceived failure to conform to socially constructed characteristics of males or females."

The United States State Department amended its policy in 2010 affecting gender markers on Social Security cards and United States passports. The change, which was still in effect in 2018, allowed individuals to provide information from their physician about updating gender on these documents. State IDs and driver's licenses are updated for gender on a state by state basis.

In 2020, the Supreme Court of the United States ruled that under Title VII of the Civil Rights Act of 1964, transgender employees are protected from discrimination in the workplace. The Biden administration has created some protections for transgender people. In July 2022, the United States Department of Health and Human Services proposed the restoration of nondiscrimination policies that would protect transgender people. In April 2023, Governor Phil Murphy established New Jersey as a "safe haven for gender-affirming health care."

States reflecting a more conservative population are more likely "to have more restrictive views on civil rights issues" which also informs their attitudes on transgender people.

The second Trump administration has rolled back most protections that transgender people once had in the US. Executive Order 14168 made it federal policy to recognize two sexes, male and female, and to treat them as unchangeable. The government bans the use of federal funds for gender-affirming care for youth 19 and under. The administration is working to ban transgender people in the military and in the civilian government.

=== Negative attitudes and opposition ===
Public opinion in the United States about transgender people is often similar to attitudes about LGBTQ individuals, with the difference being that "attitudes towards transgender individuals are significantly more negative." Writing in Sapiens, anthropologist Alex Hinton argues that some opposition rests on the idea that gender is "natural and so, by extension, transgender people are unnatural", and that people who hold this view then perceive transgender people as dangerous. Others argue that their religious beliefs prohibit them from using gender identity in place of biological sex.

Some anti-trans activists associate trans women with predatory sexual behaviors. This idea is rooted in certain forms of second-wave feminism, advocates of this idea describe trans women as "rapists and boundary-violators trying to invade women's space", while trans men are regarded as "tokens". Supporters of bathroom restrictions say they protect the privacy and safety of women and girls. A study of the effects of Massachusetts' anti-discrimination laws for restrooms found no evidence that cisgender women were placed at risk by the laws. Further, evidence has been found that the risk of assault for transgender children is reduced when they are allowed access to restrooms and locker rooms which match their gender identity. Some anti-trans activists believe that "LGBT ideology" will destabilize the United States government and that LGBT people are a security threat. Some groups and individuals have also argued that transgender soldiers are a threat to military readiness, while a 2017 analysis published by the Center for Strategic and International Studies argued that banning them would harm U.S. security.

Some socially conservative Americans also conflate people who dress in drag with transgender presentations. Christopher Rufo has implored conservatives to call drag queens "trans strippers", which, according to Nathan J. Robinson, is an inaccurate description of drag performances. Michigan Republican, Tudor Dixon, has called drag queens "sexualized performers."

Some people who oppose transgender rights argue that "irresponsible parents" and young people are rushing to make decisions about their trans identities, and that these decisions are largely based on social contagion. Conservative activists question the need to talk to children about their gender or sexual identities. A 2018 paper published by Lisa Littman in PLOS One described a hypothesis of rapid onset gender dysphoria (ROGD). Despite the fact that follow ups on Littman's study did not show support for her ideas, the paper she published has been used to justify anti-transgender legislation and policies in Florida and other US states. Social contagion ideas suggest that being transgender is a transmissible "disease" between vulnerable individuals. It also implies that being transgender is a medical issue to eradicate from the population, rather than a difference in gender identity. Activists who oppose gender-affirming care claim that physicians and parents are putting children through "irreversible medical treatments" without proper safeguards. Some states have pushed for laws banning gender-affirming care by claiming that medical treatment for transgender youth is "child abuse." Social media accounts, such as Libs of TikTok, have helped spread a moral panic about gender-affirming care. Gender-affirming care has become a focus of a wider culture war over transgender people. Major U.S. medical organizations, including the American Academy of Pediatrics, the American Medical Association and the Endocrine Society, support access to this care for minors. In England, the 2024 Cass Review judged the evidence for puberty blockers and hormones in minors to be weak, and the NHS stopped routine prescribing of puberty blockers to under-18s. In 2026 the American Medical Association said that surgery for minors should generally be deferred to adulthood, while continuing to support other gender-related care.

Hispanic LGBTQ+ organization, QLatinx, describes how "racism, sexism, heterosexism, xenophobia, and transphobia share a common root source of oppression that ultimately works to sustain white supremacy and heteropatriarchy." According to Gayle Salamon, the structures of racism, homophobia and transphobia all share the feature of inciting violence against people perceived as part of those categories. Anti-trans beliefs also have a negative effect on some Native American cultures that have two-spirit or indigenous transgender individuals.

Some transphobic ideas are also internalized by transgender people. This is called Internalized transphobia and can be expressed by the individual feeling shame, isolation, "and a harmful internalization of cisnormative gender expectations."

According to a 2023 report on anti-transgender violence, transgender lives are often treated as less important than cisgender lives, and violence and discrimination against them can become normalized.

== Early history ==
When European settlers colonized North America, they came into contact with indigenous people who had different ideas about gender and gender identity. Europeans used many tactics to impose their own gender roles and ideas onto Native peoples. The French colonizers called many third gender indigenous people "berdaches."

Encounters with Spanish colonizers led to a massive genocide of many of the Indigenous peoples of California, including "third-gender people, who were lost not by 'passive' colonizing collateral damage such as disease or starvation, but through active, conscious, violent extermination." When colonists discovered other genders among indigenous people, they worked to end the practice "through the twin disciplinary actions of physical and spiritual punishment and regendering".

As roles for indigenous non-binary people disappeared in their cultures these individuals "found themselves rejected by their families and communities."

Colonists themselves often did not fit into binary gender roles. Many non-conforming people fought in the American Revolutionary War and the American Civil War, signing up and continuing to live in their chosen gender role afterwards. Many anti-transgender ideas were already being pushed into American colonial culture by the eighteenth century. Transgender women in the 18th century faced violence and "even capital punishment." By the late nineteenth century, the idea that gender and sexuality are part of a spectrum began to spread.

== 20th century ==
Before the 1910 publication of Transvestism by Magnus Hirschfeld, most individuals who would now be considered transgender were termed "inverts," a term that also included homosexuals. The term transsexual was described by doctor David Oliver Cauldwell in the American medical literature in 1949. Prior to these medical terminologies, there were categories created by transgender people themselves, such as "men-women" and "women-men." In 1900, a transgender woman, then known as a "man-woman," was killed, and her body salted and stuffed into a trunk by her father. Her story was one of many violent accounts such people faced in the early 20th century.

After 1953, Christine Jorgensen's widely popularized "sex change operation" led to a depiction of her in both medical literature and popular media as a "sick, abnormal" person who was "rescued" by modern medicine.

During the 1960s, transgender people were not welcome in gay bars in San Francisco. By the middle of the 1960s, the Johns Hopkins University created the first "official gender-identity clinic" in the US. The clinic was described by media and press releases as being a project designed to help "unfortunate individuals, trapped in the wrong body" and would "rehabilitate" "deviant" transsexual people.

In the 1970s, the word "transsexual" was often used to describe transgender people. In the medical establishment in the United States, professionals had a pervasive sense of mistrust for their transgender patients. Doctors and psychologists who worked with the trans community had negative feelings about the people they worked with, calling them manipulative and "possibly incapable of love".

During the 1970s, transgender women were frequently rejected in lesbian spaces and they were also accused of being fake women and "male infiltrators". Beth Elliott was discriminated against by the Daughters of Bilitis, who originally allowed her to become a member in 1971, but they later succumbed to pressure to force Elliot out. Robin Morgan was one of the most prominent detractors of Elliot, who she accused of being a man who was "leeching off women", with the "mentality of a rapist". This high-profile attack led to other attacks against other transgender women who attempted to enter other types of women's spaces. Later, Sandy Stone, who had worked at Olivia Records, was subjected to a hate mail campaign which was aimed at getting her fired from the record label. Academics also sent hate mail to Stone during this time.

In 1973, more conservative lesbian and gay men in San Francisco created their own pride parade which "banned transgender people and individuals in drag". In New York City that same year, Jean O'Leary almost provoked a riot when she read a statement in which she denounced drag queens. In response to the event in New York City, the LGBT movement in the United States intensified its marginalization of transgender people.

In 1979, Janice Raymond wrote The Transsexual Empire, which is "often cited as the basis for anti-trans feminism", according to the Progressive. Raymond believed that people chose to become transgender in order to opt out of the sex roles which were assigned to them at birth. Raymond's book affected not only people involved in women's spaces, but also medical professionals. In 1979, Johns Hopkins closed its gender identity clinic after psychiatrist Jon Meyer and research assistant Donna Reter published a follow-up study concluding that surgery offered patients no objective advantage. The closure was driven by Paul McHugh, chair of psychiatry since 1975, who had stated his intention to end the surgeries. The Meyer–Reter study was widely criticized as methodologically flawed.

During the 1980s, transgender people, still more often known as transsexuals, were "treated as sick, perverse, abnormal," in society in the US. This continued into the 1990s, where individuals who do not adhere to "normal" gender roles lack a "safe social space." Thomas Szasz describes transsexualism in the 1980s in his book, Sex by Prescription as a type of castration. Szasz also felt that the diagnosis of transsexualism was too medicalized and that it was more important to look at the nature of the condition itself. Despite the criticism by Szasz and others, the idea of transsexualism as a medical disorder helped people in the medical profession to accept the idea more readily.

The Michigan Womyn's Music Festival did not allow transgender women at their events and kicked out a transsexual woman in 1991. Transsexual women were also banned from the 1991 National Lesbian Conference. Transgender people were also quietly excluded from the March on Washington for Lesbian, Gay and Bi Equal Rights and Liberation in 1993.

In 1993, Brandon Teena was raped and later killed after his transgender identity was revealed. Two men that Teena had thought were his friends were the assailants. The reporting on Teena's murder was also transphobic, often misgendering him.

Tyra Hunter was injured in 1995 in Washington, D.C. and the paramedics who responded stopped treating her and instead made fun of her because she was transgender. Hunter later died because of the injuries and no charges were made against the paramedics.

In 1996, a trans man, Robert Eads, discovered that he had ovarian cancer. Eads experienced medical discrimination with gynecologists refusing to treat him until 1997. The cancer, however, had progressed too far and Eads died in 1999.

To honor the memory of transgender people who have been lost to violence, Gwendolyn Ann Smith created the first Transgender Day of Remembrance in 1999.

== 21st century ==
=== Government actions ===
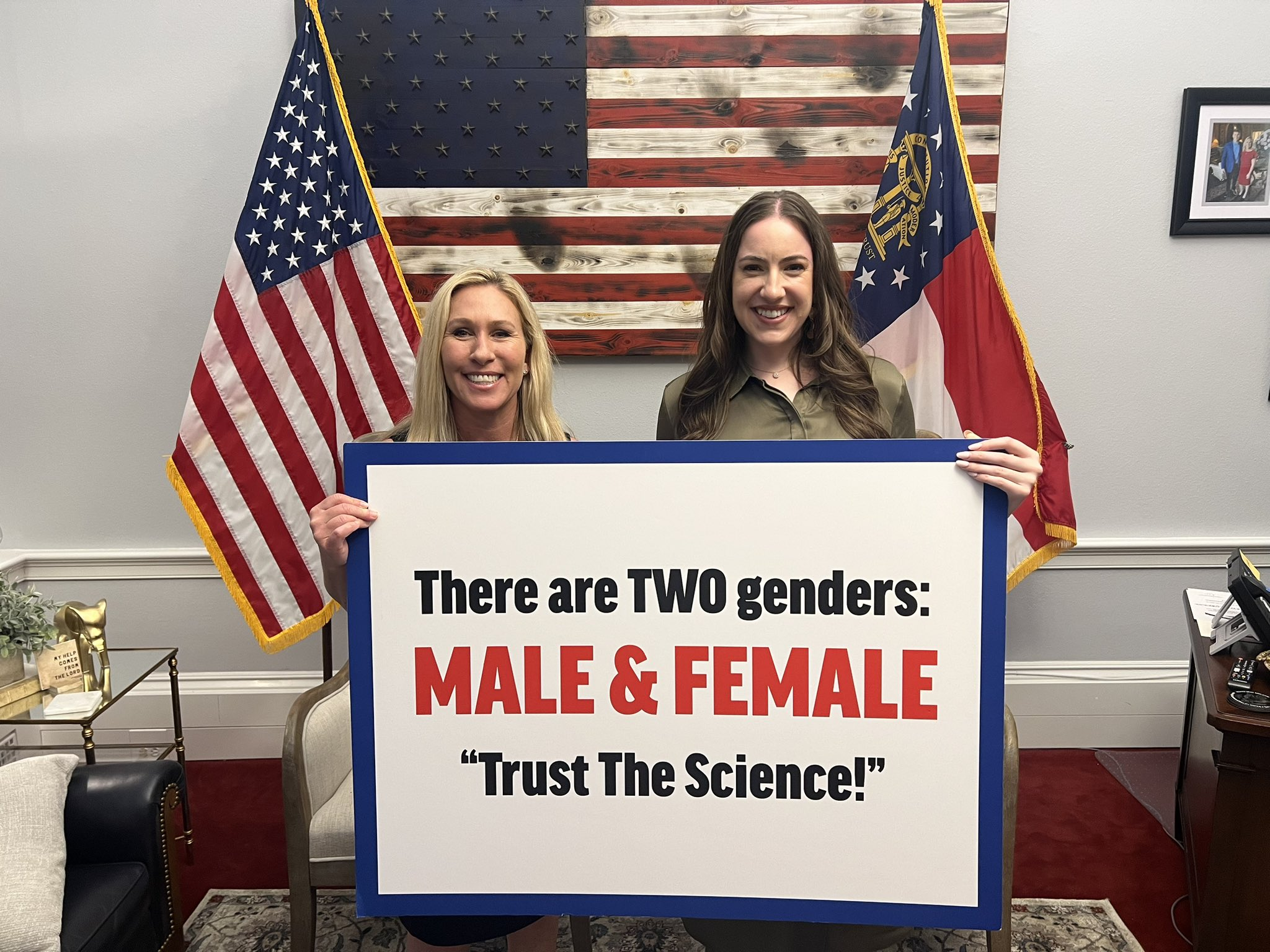
Libs of TikTok founder Chaya Raichik and Representative Marjorie Taylor Greene at the US Capitol

Government entities in the United States that create anti-transgender legislation and policies are using "medical gatekeeping" as a "tool whereby the state can use medical language and practice to barriers around gender affirming care." In 2021, professor Eric Stanley describes transgender people "props in the latest culture war," and goes on to describe how "anti-trans bills are rooted in an obsession with the idea of trans people's bodies."

When the federal Employment Non-Discrimination Act was proposed in 2007, it contained language protecting sexual orientation and gender identity. However, the sponsors eventually removed gender identity protections because President George W. Bush said he would veto the bill if they were included.

Arkansas passed the 2015 Intrastate Commerce Improvement Act which prohibited local governments from enacting laws protecting LGBTQ people at greater levels than are already afforded at the state level. Because Arkansas does not provide protections for LGBTQ people at the state level, this bans local governments from also protecting LGBTQ individuals as well. In addition, this act was passed right after Fayetteville, Arkansas worked to pass civil rights protections for LGBTQ people in the city.

In 2016, when a large number of "bathroom bills" were proposed in the country, the result was that all women faced harassment due to increased policing on who was using what bathroom. In Kansas, a proposal was created that would give students $2,500 as a bounty for reporting trans people using unapproved restrooms. Washington State proposed a similar law which would allow students to sue their schools for $2,500 if they "encounter a trans person in the bathroom." In March 2016, North Carolina passed their bathroom bill, the Public Facilities Privacy & Security Act, which led to a national outcry and several large businesses threatening not to do business in the state. Later in 2016, a case, Franciscan Alliance v. Burwell, was filed which sought to have regulations protecting trans people accessing healthcare struck down.

The Trump administration reversed Title VII policies that protected transgender people based on sex, stating that these protections applied only to cisgender individuals. On February 20, 2017, the Trump administration "withdrew guidance...stating federal law requires transgender students to have access to bathrooms and locker rooms matching their gender identity." In July of the same year, President Trump announced a ban on transgender people serving in the United States military. In October 2018, Trump proposed a roll back of civil rights protections in healthcare for transgender people.

The first state to ban transfeminine athletes from participating in youth sports was Idaho. On March 30, 2020, the bill was signed by Governor Brad Little. During 2020, 16 other states also drafted bills that were similar to the one passed in Idaho. Supporters say the laws keep girls' and women's competition fair, on the view that transgender athletes may have a biological advantage; opponents call them discriminatory and dispute that transgender girls necessarily have one. In 2020, the Alliance Defending Freedom (ADF) filed a lawsuit to challenge Connecticut's rule allowing transgender students to participate in youth sports according to their gender identity. The case was dismissed in 2021 and the dismissal was affirmed by a Second Circuit panel in 2022, but in December 2023 the full Second Circuit revived it, ruling that the plaintiffs had standing, and it remains pending.

In 2021 and 2022, a "historic wave of bills" targeting transgender people were developed and proposed in state legislatures around the country. This amounted to around 200 bills, all proposed by Republican lawmakers. Governor Tate Reeves signed a bill in 2021 that banned transgender students from participating in school sports that match their gender identities. Governor Kristi Noem in March 2021 issued an executive order banning trans girls from girls' sports teams in South Dakota. Arkansas passed a bill in April 2021 blocking youth from accessing gender-affirming care.

Legislators in Alabama created a bill in February 2022 that would require transgender students in grades K-12 to use the restroom matching the sex on their birth certificate. April 2022, Alabama Governor Kay Ivey signed a bill that would make gender-affirming care for youth a felony. Later, that bill was blocked from going into effect with a partial injunction from the state court. State attorneys in Alabama have vowed to appeal the ruling and believe that there is no constitutional right to gender affirming healthcare for children or adults.

In March 2022, Florida Governor Ron DeSantis signed the Florida Parental Rights in Education Act, which banned the ability to discuss sexual orientation or gender identity in a classroom setting for specific grades. In November 2021, Oklahoma Governor, Kevin Stitt, signed an executive order to prohibit changing gender identity on Oklahoma birth certificates. Also in 2022, Iowa created a bill to prevent transgender youth from participating in sports matching their gender identity.

In February 2022, Governor Greg Abbott declared transitioning and HRT to be "child abuse" and ordered Child Protective Services (CPS) to investigate parents who allowed their children to transition. Texas Attorney General, Ken Paxton, had earlier issued a legal opinion that gender-affirming care was a form of child abuse. Paxton also requested a list from the Texas Department of Public Safety of all people who "had switched the gender identifier on their Texas driver's license within the past two years." The order from Abbott and Paxton also required that therapists report any clients receiving gender-affirming care. In Dallas, one hospital stopped providing gender-affirming care at their facility after Abbott's directive was made public and Texas Children's Hospital also stopped providing HRT. Several families were investigated by CPS after the directive was ordered. In June 2022, a judge from Travis County blocked these kinds of investigations into families with transgender kids. After the directive, families began to look for ways to leave the state. A political strategist for Greg Abbott described the matter as a "winning issue" for the governor as he runs for office again. By November 2024, Paxton had sued three Texas doctors for allegedly prescribing HRT for minors after Texas banned gender affirming care.

In May 2022, a Title IX investigation took place at a Wisconsin school when several middle school students allegedly misgendered another student. The case received attention from conservative media outlets, including The Laura Ingraham Show. The investigation was dismissed after the school and much of the city of Kiel, Wisconsin received bomb threats.

In June 2022, the Texas Republican Party adopted bans for gender-affirming care as part of their party platform. Later, the Texas GOP claimed that drag shows are more of a threat to children than guns. Michigan Republicans proposed a bill in June 2022 that would let parents sue any public school that allowed their children to see a drag show. DeSantis, in Florida, worked on taking away Medicaid coverage for gender-affirming care from transgender people of any age. In June 2022, the Ohio House of Representatives passed House Bill 151, which would have required verification of an athlete's sex, including examination of "internal and external reproductive anatomy," where an athlete's sex was disputed. The Ohio Senate removed that provision in December 2022 and the bill did not become law.

In July 2022, attorneys general from twenty states, including Alabama, Alaska, Arizona, Arkansas, Georgia, Indiana, Kansas, Kentucky, Louisiana, Mississippi, Missouri, Montana, Nebraska, Ohio, Oklahoma, South Carolina, South Dakota, Tennessee, Texas, Utah, Virginia, and West Virginia filed suit against the United States Department of Agriculture over their prohibition of discrimination against LGBTQ people receiving school meals. This included discrimination against gender identity. In Florida, state education officials told schools to "disregard recent guidance from the Biden administration" that would help protect transgender students under Title IX. Florida Education Commissioner, Manny Diaz Jr., called the guidance regarding transgender protections "woke insanity." In mid-July, the GOP in the US House of Representatives supported bills that would target transgender athletes with the "Protection of Women and Girls in Sports Act" sponsored by Greg Steube. Late in July 2022, Governor Ron DeSantis used a 1947 Florida Supreme Court Decision as guidance in his complaint over a drag show. DeSantis alleged that the drag venue violated a public nuisance law.

Marjorie Taylor Greene, a US Representative, introduced a bill called Protect Children's Innocence Act in August 2022 that would make providing gender-affirming care to minors a class C felony. The bill specifies sending anyone who provides such care a prison sentence of 10 to 25 years and would also prohibit the use of federal funds for gender affirming care. This would effectively stop anyone who is using Affordable Healthcare Act plans from accessing gender affirming care.

In November 2022, the Florida medical board restricted most gender-affirming care for minors. In December 2023, Monarch High School in Florida was fined $16,500 total for allowing a transgender athlete to compete in girls' volleyball. In 2022, Kentucky banned transgender girls from participating in sports, banning the only girl playing in the state at the time.

In preparation of the Texas legislative session in January 2023, Republican lawmakers pre-filed bills that will target transgender people and make gender-affirming care illegal for youth. By January 19, 2023, over 124 bills were introduced that would target LGBTQ and transgender people in the U.S. In Florida, a number of bills affecting transgender people were introduced in February 2023. Bills filed targeted drag shows, gender-affirming care, libraries containing LGBTQ books, and one bill would prohibit teachers from using a students' preferred pronouns. In Tennessee early in March 2023, Governor Bill Lee signed a law banning minors from watching drag shows. On March 3, Florida submitted SB254 which would allow the state to take away children from parents who allow gender-affirming care for them, even if they live outside of the state. At the end of March 2023, Kentucky legislature overrode the governor's veto and put into law that bans gender affirming care in the state and requires doctors to de-transition minors who are already receiving care. In addition, schools may not allow conversations around gender or sexual identity for all grades.

In April 2023, Montana removed transgender lawmaker, Zooey Zephyr, from the floor and then proceeded to pass a bill banning gender affirming care for minors. Idaho passed a law banning gender affirming care for minors with a punishment of up to 10 years in prison for any doctor providing gender affirming care.

In May 2023, Missouri passed a bill to restrict gender affirming care and sports participation for transgender minors. Oklahoma also passed a bill that month making it a felony to provide gender-affirming care to minors. Transgender people were arrested and removed from the Texas Capitol in May 2023 for protesting a ban on gender-affirming care for minors. Early in May 2023, the governor of Indiana, Eric Holcomb, signed a bill that would potentially out transgender students to their families. North Dakota governor, Doug Burgum, signed a bill in May 2023 that prohibits public schools and government entities from creating policies about pronouns.

In August 2023, Katy Independent School District (KISD) passed gender identity policies that many LGBTQ people and allies called an "attack" on non gender conforming students in the school. KISD was one of the first school districts in the Houston area to pass guidelines that have negative effects on transgender students. In February 2024, Texas Governor, Greg Abbott responded negatively to a Joint Allegation Letter from the United Nations (UN) that outlines a "comprehensive assault on the rights of the queer community" in Texas. Abbott only responded to the legal allegations by writing on X (formerly Twitter), "The UN can go pound sand."

In February 2024, Nassau County prohibited transgender athletes from competing with cisgender athletic teams through an executive order signed by Bruce Blakeman. In March, New York Attorney General Letitia James ordered the county to cease and desist from violating the New York State Human Rights Law. Blakeman is seeking to overturn the ruling in order to continue to prohibit transgender athletes from equally using "more than 100 public venues" in the county.

Governor Kristi Noem of South Dakota warned the Board of Regents to stop allowing diversity initiatives in state Universities. This affected several faculty members who used their pronouns and tribal affiliations in official communications, such as email.

By the end of 2023, 22 states had passed bans on gender affirming care for minors. In early 2024, 10 states were considering bills that would restrict transgender and non-binary individuals for using public services.

Early in June 2024, two professors from the University of Texas filed a lawsuit against the federal government for protecting nonbinary students. The professors claim that the guidance for Title IX does not cover the use of "they" as a singular pronoun. A Texas judge, Reed O'Connor, blocked the Title IX protections by June 12 with an injunction, claiming that the Biden Administration "had overstepped its authority" in "requiring schools to respect trans and nonbinary students' pronouns and allow them access to the restrooms of their choice." In late June 2024, the Texas Republican party celebrated when the Texas Supreme Court upheld the state's ban on gender affirming care for minors. The state representative who wrote the ban "called the win 'gratifying' and further proof that the state of Texas could continue to regulate medical practices."

The 2024 Republican National Convention in July featured repeated criticism of transgender people from speakers, which NBC News and The 19th described as prominent anti-LGBTQ rhetoric. The convention's themes matched positions in Project 2025, the Heritage Foundation's policy blueprint, which describes gender identity as "gender ideology" and calls for removing federal protections based on sexual orientation and gender identity across agencies.

In October 2024, Odessa, Texas passed an ordinance making it a Class C misdemeanor to use a restroom in a city facility that does not match the sex on one's birth certificate, and creating a private right of action allowing any person to sue a violator for statutory damages of at least $10,000 per violation, which critics described as a bounty. On November 12, 2024, the city council amended the ordinance to extend the private right of action beyond city facilities to restrooms in privately owned buildings, and to allow suits by anyone regardless of whether they live in Odessa. Opponents, including the ACLU of Texas, said the ordinance would make the city more dangerous for transgender people and that because the civil damages apply per occurrence, businesses and residents could face repeated lawsuits.

During the 2024 Presidential election the Republican Party used transgender people as a "wedge issue," airing anti-transgender attack ads during "high-profile sports events." Many of these ads contained misinformation and false claims. The ads also used images of transgender people and drag performers without getting these individuals' consent.

Starting in 2025, new anti-transgender legislation has been proposed. In Oklahoma, the state legislature also began in early 2025 to look at rules, proposed by State Representative Molly Jenkins, that would allow only "biological females" to use women's restrooms in the state House. In Nebraska, Senator Kathleen Kauth, is pushing a bill that would "regulate" transgender people in any area the state has jurisdiction. Kauth named the bill, LB 89, aka the Stand With Women Act.

==== United States Congress transgender bathroom dispute ====
In November 2024, U.S. House Representative Nancy Mace introduced a resolution to ban transgender people from using bathrooms that match their gender identity at the U.S. Capitol, in anticipation of the swearing in of Sarah McBride, who is the first trans person elected to Congress. Mace misgendered McBride in several statements. She confirmed that McBride was "absolutely" the target of her bathroom resolution. Mace previously claimed she was "pro-transgender rights," but went on to post anti-transgender rhetoric on her social media that month. Speaker of the House Mike Johnson announced the ban going into effect in Congress two days later on Transgender Day of Remembrance. Following the ban, Mace announced the filing of a bill with the goal of banning transgender people from using restrooms that match their gender identity on any federal property. The expanded bill was introduced as H.R.10186 on the same day as the announcement of the ban and was co-sponsored by Representative Marjorie Taylor Greene and Michael Rulli.

==== Second Trump administration ====
One of the first acts of the Second Trump administration on January 20, 2025, was to reduce protections and civil rights for LGBTQ people and especially transgender people. The administration will "only recognize a person's gender assigned at birth." Trump is preparing to ban transgender service members from serving in the military and finalized the ban in an executive order issued on January 27, 2025. The administration describes the orders as protecting women. Many of the executive orders use dehumanizing terminology when they describe gender-affirming care. On February 21, 2025, Trump threatened to take away federal funding for the state of Maine over issues related to transgender athletes and his recent executive orders.

Transgender people have already been affected by the changes made by the 2nd Trump administration. US passport applications for transgender people were halted. After the temporary halt, transgender people have been receiving their passports, but without correct gender markers and with expected delays. Transgender prisoners are also being affected with prisons planning to move these inmates to facilities that do not correspond to their gender identity. This order would affect "about 16" transgender women who are imprisoned by the Bureau of Prisons.

Within the federal government, transgender people have been fired. In late February 2025, the Trump administration ordered the Pentagon to identify and discharge transgender service members. By mid-March, the Veterans Administration (VA) stated that the department will stop providing health care covering gender dysphoria for veterans. In April 2025, the Trump administration was warning the Smithsonian Institution to remove information about transgender people from the American Women's History Museum or they would lose federal funding.

By February 2025, the Trans Legislation Tracker counted 379 active bills in state legislatures that it classified as anti-transgender. As of February 2025, the state legislature of Iowa has been considering a bill that would remove civil rights protections from transgender people in the state. In the same month, the state of Ohio started prohibiting transgender students from using restrooms that match their gender identity. Early in March, Indiana Governor Mike Braun signed an executive order banning transgender women in state sports and also prohibiting the use of certain types of language used at the state level.

In late February, the Department of Homeland Security (DHS) changed their policy and will now allow specific and targeted surveillance of LGBTQ+ individuals. Agencies, like DOGE, can use government data it collects to create databases which identify transgender Americans. Elon Musk, the head of DOGE, has been criticized for anti-transgender statements. In March 2025, Musk posted a series of comments about his estranged daughter, Vivian Wilson, that were described as transphobic.

The first arrest of a transgender person violating a bathroom law happened on March 19 in Tallahassee, Florida. Marcy Rheintgen was arrested in the Florida State Capitol when she attempted to use the women's restroom. In March 2025, the Mississippi Library Commission ordered its libraries to delete databases that include information and history relating to "Gender identity."

On June 18, 2025, the Supreme Court ruled on United States v. Skrmetti and upheld a Tennessee ban on gender affirming care for minors. Writing for the majority, Chief Justice John Roberts said the case carried "fierce scientific and policy debates about the safety, efficacy, and propriety of medical treatments in an evolving field" and left the policy question to legislatures. The dissenting justices said the law drew a sex-based line that deserved closer judicial scrutiny. In June 2025, the Supreme Court ordered lower courts to revisit their decisions favoring transgender rights in cases from North Carolina, West Virginia and Oklahoma in light of their decision on United States v. Skrmetti.

In September 2025, the Trump administration called on the FBI to target transgender people. Vice president JD Vance claimed that transgender people present a "domestic terrorist threat", despite a lack of evidence to support the claim. The FBI has been directed by the Trump administration to label transgender people as "nihilistic violent extremists". The federal government also removed mentions of transgender people from official bulletins that monitored threats to the LGBTQ community ahead of Pride Month. In December 2025, the Trump administration published "regulatory actions designed to effectively ban gender-affirming care for minors."

On February 26, 2026, a Kansas law, House Substitute for Senate Bill 244, which affects transgender people, went into effect. The law invalidates current driver's licenses for Kansas residents who have a changed gender marker. The law, which has no grace period, affects more than 1,000 people. The law also requires people using public restrooms in government buildings to match their assigned sex at birth.

On March 10, 2026 the United States Court of Appeals for the Fourth Circuit ruled that West Virginia can ban gender affirming procedures for adults from being covered by Medicaid.

In September of 2026, the Oklahoma Supreme Court decided that no changes were allowed to "sex designation" on a person's birth certificate.

=== Transphobia in US culture ===
In 2019, Ditch the Label published an analysis of 10 million online social media and forum posts from a time period starting around 2016. This analysis revealed a large amount of transphobic language and ideas being shared in the United States. Many of the transphobic ideas and commentary have been shared on Facebook, which left-leaning media watchdog Media Matters called "one of the biggest bad actors" in this area. The Daily Wire was also involved in spreading misinformation about transgender people online during this time, using transphobia to increase engagement with their website.

The Westboro Baptist Church protested at Morehouse College in 2019 when the school allowed trans men to enroll for the first time.

During the Conservative Political Action Conference (CPAC) held in 2021, Caitlyn Jenner found herself attacked by attendees who deadnamed her and called her names.

Dave Chappelle's 2021 Netflix special, The Closer, contained jokes that some considered transphobic. Chappelle's live shows continue to receive protests from people who oppose the way he has talked about transgender people. Netflix employees asked the company to recognize that "transphobic content causes harm." The company's trans employee resource group sent demands to Netflix management and planned to organize a walkout in response to the continued support of Chappelle. A protest was held on October 20, 2021, in Los Angeles where employees of Netflix supporting trans rights held a rally that included Joey Soloway as a speaker. Chappelle fans also appeared at the protest, carrying their own signs supporting the comedian and his content.

In May 2022, State Farm faced attacks from conservative activists over their GenderCool Project which would donate children's books with LGBTQ themes to schools and libraries. The project was meant to "raise awareness around what it means to be transgender, inclusive and nonbinary." Due to the backlash, State Farm dropped the project.

In June 2022, pride month, The Daily Wire commentator Matt Walsh released a documentary called What Is a Woman?. Walsh is also the publisher of the children's book Johnny the Walrus, which allegorically compares being transgender to pretending to be a walrus. Media Matters reported that on the first day of pride month alone there were eight instances of transgender people being disparaged on Fox News, especially transgender swimmer Lia Thomas.

In Nashville, Tennessee on October 21, 2022, The Daily Wire organized a rally titled "The Rally to End Child Mutilation" in protest to gender-affirming care for minors. Between 1,500 and 3,000 people attended, which included supporters, protesters, and Tennessee senators and representatives.

After the 2023 Nashville school shooting, perpetrated by a transgender shooter, there was an increase in transphobia on public platforms. Transgender people in Tennessee faced backlash, though many pushed back, saying it is more important to restrict gun access.

A law passed in North Dakota, banning gender affirming care for minors, went into effect in April 2023. As of June 2024, the ban continues to be upheld for most minors in the state.

In the lead up to Pride in April 2023 a commercial for Bud Light featuring the actress Dylan Mulvaney caused a conservative boycott of the company. The week before Pride in late May 2023, Target released their Pride collection featuring products to celebrate the LGBTQ+ community. Subsequently, conservative anti-LGBTQ groups spread misinformation about some of the products and after receiving threats against stores and employees from anti-LGBTQ groups, the company decided to remove some merchandise and move their Pride displays into the back of some stores, causing a heavy backlash by GLAAD and other LGBTQ advocacy groups requesting that Target return the merchandise and release a statement in support of the LGBTQ+ community.

Sey created a line of athletic clothing in March 2024 called XX-XY Athletics which she says is intended "to help protect women and girls from being forced to compete and share locker rooms with transgender athletes." Those who have joined her include Chloe Cole, Adam Coleman, Riley Gaines, Tabia Lee, and Paula Scanlan. Also in March 2024, conservative blogger Michael Shellenberger and the group Genspect released leaked files about transgender care, which Media Matters said were taken out of context and contained some false claims. Media Matters has characterized Shellenberger's writing as portraying transgender people as mentally ill, unnatural, and part of "foundational woke ideologies." His newsletter "has increasingly focused on the supposed threats that trans people pose to society, including to women's sports, women in general, the family and Western civilization." In May 2024, Gaines used social media to show her support of a crowd booing the win of a transgender athlete in the Oregon School Activities Association (OSAA) women's 200 meter run. A Florida employee, and parent of a transgender athlete, at Monarch High School is still waiting as of June 2024 to find out if she will be suspended for a potential violation of the Fairness in Women's Sports Act.

In early 2024, Best Buy was contacted by the National Center for Public Policy Research (NCPPR), a conservative think tank, over donations the company had made to LGBTQ groups, such as The Trevor Project and GLAAD. NCPPR accused Best Buy of donating to groups they believe are "seeking to mutilate the reproductive organs of children before they finish puberty," and that donations to LGBTQ groups was out of the scope of an electronics company. After NCPPR went after Best Buy, the company agreed to "screen" their donations and their pages supporting LGBTQ people were taken down. Because NCPPR is a shareholder of Best Buy, they were able to threaten monetary sanctions against the company and they filed a complaint with the SEC.

In April 2024, police were called on a transgender high school student attending her high school prom in Jackson County, Alabama because she wore a dress and would not change into pants.

Early in 2025, Meta severely loosened restrictions on its "Hateful Conduct" policy which now allows users to accuse LGBTQ, and especially transgender people, as having a mental illness or being "abnormal."

Because of the executive orders issued early in the Second Trump administration, many hospitals providing gender affirming care had to re-evaluate their programs. By early February 2025, several hospitals were issuing statements that they had ended such care for their patients. A community health clinic in Los Angeles was also impacted by the executive orders which stopped grant funds supporting transgender patients. The Children's Hospital Los Angeles halted their gender affirming care after the executive orders.

After the January 2025 Potomac River mid-air collision, right-wing commentator Matthew S. Wallace was one of several people on social media who claimed without evidence that a transgender pilot caused the crash. A WIRED investigation published in July 2025 found that this collision and the July 2024 attempted assassination of Donald Trump in Pennsylvania were two of a dozen incidents since 2022 where a transgender person was falsely blamed for a tragedy or violent incident.

In February 2026, Lawrence B. Jones said that transgender people should not be allowed to own guns because of the 2026 Pawtucket shooting.

=== Violent incidents and threats ===
In October 2002, transgender teen, Gwen Araujo, was beaten and then strangled at a house party in Newark. Her assault took place after she was discovered to be transgender and the men responsible used the "trans panic" defense in their murder trial. Latisha King, a non-gender conforming student, aged 15, was shot twice by a 14 year old fellow student who felt that she had disrespected him. King was "taunted and teased for the way she lived her gender, for its style."

CeCe McDonald was assaulted outside a bar in 2011 in Minneapolis. When a fight broke out, McDonald was stabbed and one of her attackers was killed during the fight. McDonald was charged with second-degree murder, despite having acted in self-defense. She accepted a plea agreement and spent two years in a men's prison.

Kiwi Farms was founded in 2013 as an offshoot of a forum devoted to harassing a single autistic web personality, and later grew into a platform for coordinated harassment of many people, disproportionately those who are neurodivergent or LGBT. Users of Kiwi Farms would find people on the internet to stalk, dox, and harass. The "site has been blamed for the deaths of several victims," many of whom were transgender.

In 2019, 25 transgender or gender nonconforming people died after they were subjected to acts of violence. 2021 became one of the "deadliest on record in America," for transgender and gender nonconforming people in the United States with 29 deaths by June and at least 50 by the end of the year.

The Tenacious Unicorn Ranch, an all-transgender farm in Colorado, faced alleged armed threats on March 6, 2021. After this event, Kiwi Farms facilitated further harassment of the ranchers online. In 2022, the Kiwi Farms forum had over 800 posts targeting the ranch.

On March 24, 2022, former Mississippi legislator, Robert Foster, used Twitter to express his opinion that allies of transgender people should be "lined up against [a] wall before a firing squad to be sent to an early judgment." Foster did not apologize for his tweet, instead saying that the law should be changed to allow such executions. In June 2022, Mark Burns, a pastor and a candidate running in South Carolina, said that allies, teachers, and parents who support LGBTQ+ rights should be arrested and executed.

In June 2022, a drag brunch in Arlington, Texas was targeted by alleged Proud Boys, as was a California library that same month. At the San Francisco Bay Area event, "The [Proud Boys] were described as extremely aggressive with a threatening violent demeanor causing people to fear for their safety." The Proud Boys may have been tipped off by Libs of TikTok.

In July 2022, a cafe in Chicago that was planning to host a drag performance was vandalized. Libs of TikTok was also involved in a campaign to target Jewish summer camps in California that accepted transgender children. The camps had to take additional "steps to ensure security."

In the same month, 20-year-old transgender man Noah Ruiz was assaulted by three men while camping in Camden, Ohio. After being advised to use the women's restroom, despite identifying as male, he was angrily confronted by a woman in the bathroom before she stormed out. Upon exiting, he was approached by three men, who proceeded to beat him up while reportedly using homophobic slurs. When Preble County sheriff's deputies arrived, Ruiz was arrested for "disorderly conduct and obstructing official business"; The Preble Country Sheriff claimed they were not aware of the assault, and that Ruiz was highly intoxicated and belligerent. Ruiz was able to file an assault report with the sheriff's office, demanding the men to be held accountable.

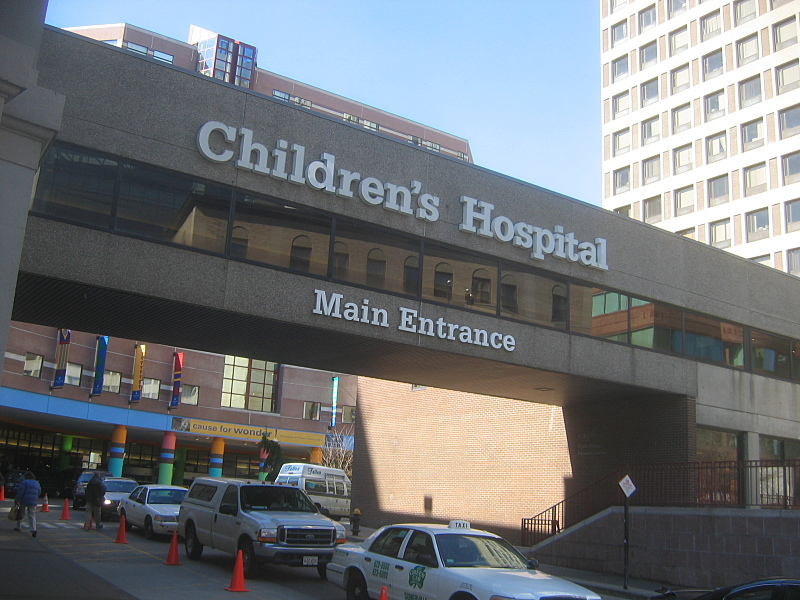
Boston Children's Hospital received bomb threats in 2022.

In August 2022, the social media account Libs of TikTok falsely claimed that Boston Children's Hospital (BCH) was performing hysterectomies on minors. Hospital staff received violent threats, and the volume of harassment left some patients unable to reach providers by phone. The account made a similar false claim about Children's National Hospital in Washington, D.C., which then received bomb and death threats, and children's hospitals in Pittsburgh and Phoenix were also targeted. A bomb threat on August 30 put BCH into lockdown, and a second threat followed on September 9. A woman from Westfield, Massachusetts was arrested on September 15 and charged with making one of the threats, and the FBI said BCH had received "well over a dozen".

In September 2022, Matt Walsh of The Daily Wire said that doctors at Vanderbilt University Medical Center (VUMC) in Tennessee "drug", "castrate" and "mutilate" children, and that the hospital offered gender-affirming care because it was a "money-maker". VUMC said Walsh had "misrepresent[ed] facts" and took down its transgender clinic's webpage. After Tucker Carlson showed the names and photographs of VUMC doctors on Fox News, the hospital reported online harassment that included calls for the doctors to be arrested or killed. Tennessee Republicans, including Governor Bill Lee, called for an investigation of the clinic, and state investigators later obtained patient records from VUMC for Attorney General Jonathan Skrmetti. A class-action lawsuit over the release of the records was filed in July 2023.

In October 2022, the American Academy of Pediatrics, the American Medical Association and the Children's Hospital Association asked U.S. Attorney General Merrick Garland to investigate the threats against children's hospitals and physicians.

On November 19, 2022, the Colorado Springs Club Q shooting took the lives of 5 people and injured 25 others. The club was considered a safe place for transgender people in the city. During the December 14, 2022, Congressional hearing, LGBTQ+ shooting survivors shared their fears about the "rising hate" towards their community, especially towards people who are transgender or who perform in drag. In December 2022, a transgender teacher who had been a target of Fox News stories faced bomb threats.

During the March 2023 Conservative Political Action Conference, Daily Wire contributor Michael Knowles stated that "transgenderism should be eradicated from public life entirely." Knowles' comments sparked outrage, and were characterized as genocidal by various outlets, human rights organizations, and scholars. In August 2023, Libs of TikTok shared an edited video of a school librarian in Tulsa, Oklahoma which led to "several consecutive days of bomb threats to schools in the district." During the summer of 2023, a Los Angeles County Sheriff's deputy allegedly assaulted a transgender man and later plead guilty in court for the incident.

On February 3, 2024, Mark Robinson, current Lieutenant Governor of North Carolina and candidate for Governor, threatened trans women with arrest over bathroom use and suggested that they "find a corner outside somewhere".

On February 7, 2024, a sixteen-year-old non-binary student was beaten inside the girls' restroom at the Owasso High School. The student, Nex Benedict, received "months of intensifying bullying" which started after Oklahoma passed legislation in 2023 that outlawed students from using bathrooms that match their gender identity. After being assaulted by three female students in the girls' restroom, a teacher intervened, but did not call an ambulance for Benedict. The day after the incident, Benedict collapsed in their living room and was taken to the hospital. They were declared deceased at the hospital, and the medical examiner ruled the cause of death as suicide.

In early June 2024, a Minnesota father of a transgender student called for criminal charges to be pressed on students that harassed and assaulted his daughter. His daughter was using the bathroom where she was bullied and then sustained a compound fracture during the ensuing fight. The school, Hopkins High, did not treat the incident "as an emergency," despite the injuries sustained by his daughter.

In November 2024, two transgender women were confronted and attacked by a group of people in Minneapolis. The women sustained injuries from the group of attackers and activists in the area are worried about additional violence against transgender people.

In March 2025, Libs of TikTok shared a video on its social media account featuring a transgender Texas teacher discussing her gender identity. The Libs of TikTok account also shared the name of the school of the teacher. Because of the video, the teacher was forced to resign because the school received death threats and harassment. In addition, politician Brian Harrison called for her to be fired.

== Effects ==
Transgender people experience violent victimization at roughly four times the rate of cisgender people, according to a Williams Institute analysis of 2017–2018 National Crime Victimization Survey data. Transgender people are subject to minority stress. This type of stress is created through stigma, prejudice, and discrimination. Many transgender people face bullying and harassment in many different venues in their lives. Transphobia is manifested through a "hostile political climate" and by marginalizing transgender individuals in society. Stigma against transgender people can lead to increased depression and anxiety. Chronic exposure to stressors can cause "biological weathering" that cause physical health issues. Transgender people who testified against anti-transgender bills in the Texas Capitol found the long hearings "exhausting and upsetting." Some transgender people have to file lawsuits over laws, such as bathroom bills, which restrict their civil rights. The effect of such laws is to "push" transgender people "out of public and civic life." During the 2nd Trump administration, transgender people have been having difficulty receiving their passports, affecting their everyday lives and ability to travel.

The legal actions and politics that have been passed against transgender youth have caused negative mental health outcomes for many young people and all transgender individuals. This can include high rates of suicidal ideation. Even if the bills do not pass, the stress of seeing the measures debated causes issues for many people. Crisis calls to The Trevor Project have seen high rates in states like Texas in 2022. In 2017, there was also an increase in calls to the crisis hotline after Texas considered a bathroom bill that year. Some families are looking to move out of states that have passed transphobic legislation. A 2015 study found that 90 percent of young transgender people were rejected in some way by their families. When their families are not supportive of them, "trans young people seek out alternative forms of support and affirmation." When young trans people are allowed to socially transition, it eases both anxiety and depression for them. Transphobia creates both "stigma and discrimination" which has a negative effect on transgender youth. Around 78 percent of transgender students in grades K through 12 described various types of harassment from other students, teachers, or school staff. Transgender youth who had gone through conversion therapy had a markedly increased rate of suicide attempts compared to LGBT youth who did not experience this type of abuse.

Many transgender people have difficulty accessing health care. Transgender women "experience critical barriers to healthcare and significant health inequities due to their minoritized status." According to a 2008 study conducted by the National Center for Transgender Equality, around 19 percent of the respondents reported being refused care by healthcare professionals because they were transgender. A study in 2015 found that health insurance denied coverage of gender affirming surgery to 55% of transgender adults attempting to access that care. During the COVID-19 pandemic, transgender people were left out demographically because public health organizations rarely collect data on sexual or gender minorities (SGM).

Transgender and gender diverse people may also avoid accessing healthcare due to their "fear of mistreatment" and lack of provider knowledge. In 2011, a study found that medical students only receive on average five hours of "LGBT-related content" during their years in school. Transgender individuals accessing health care while in prison have "filed numerous lawsuits detailing substandard care and withholding of transition-related care." Biases and lack of education on transgender topics by healthcare providers often leads to transgender women not seeking health care, even if they have insurance. In other cases, family members have also blocked transgender individuals access to gender affirming care. Many transgender children hide their gender identities from their families due to "parent adopting transphobic and cisnormative beliefs and actions." Transgender patients may also avoid necessary health screenings because of their anxiety in dealing with reactions from healthcare providers who may be ignorant of transgender issues or may display transphobic tendencies. Because of many of these factors, many transgender adults seek access to hormones from non-licensed sources.

Transphobia in the United States can also lead to higher rates of unemployment and discrimination in the workplace. Transgender and gender diverse people have twice the unemployment rates in the US when compared to the general population. The National Center for Transgender Equality (NCTE) found in a 2015 survey that the unemployment rate for transgender people in the US was three times the rate of cisgender people. The same survey described that 15% of trans people who were employed faced various levels of harassment on the job, ranging from verbal to physical assault. Because many transgender people face employment discrimination, they are more likely to experience insecurity in housing. The NCTE survey found that almost 1/3 of transgender respondents experienced homelessness.

Transgender athletes face the reality that from one day to the next they may be prohibited from participating in their chosen activity. Ending a sports career can be damaging for an athlete's mental health. Framing the issue of trans women in sports as "biological males competing against girls" is how opponents both misgender and "deny the humanity of transgender girls."

Some scholars and commentators argue that conservative American politicians have used opposition to transgender rights to mobilize their voters. Polling has found rising public support for some restrictions on transgender people. After Donald Trump won the presidential race in November 2024, it led to the Democratic Party to rethink their stance on transgender rights. As moderate and centrist Democratic politicians evaluated the 2024 electoral races, many believed that Democratic support for transgender issues may have cost them the election. Because the Republican Party ran so many anti-transgender attack ads, Democratic party supporters also blamed transgender people for their electoral losses in November 2024. Writing in The Advocate, John Casey argued that blaming transgender people for the loss put them in danger. Transgender people are increasingly facing backlash and erosion of their civil rights under the second Trump administration. Germany has issued a warning for transgender and nonbinary citizens visiting the United States because of the Trump administration's policies on transgender people.

=== Effects on cisgender people ===
Cisgender people can experience the effects of transphobia. Human Rights Watch reported in 2001 that "many students are wrongly perceived as transgender, yet such persons are similarly subject to persecution." In August 2022, a school investigated a girl who "outclassed" the rest of her peers in a high school sporting event. The parents of the girls who placed second and third complained to the Utah High School Activities Association (UHSAA) where they "questioned the winner's gender." UHSAA investigated the girl, opening up her enrollment records back to kindergarten, all without informing the student or her family. States that have passed anti-transgender laws find that many cisgender athletes often become wrongly accused of being transgender.

In July 2023, a cisgender woman, Michelle Dionne Peacock, was allegedly murdered in Indiana. Her killer believed that Peacock was "a male acting like a woman," and despite complaints that she was being harassed, "nothing was done." Cisgender women are at risk of transphobic violence if they do not conform to gender stereotypes. In situations where people with disabilities need care from someone of the opposite gender, their lives can be complicated by bathroom bills. In Odessa, Texas as of October 2024, any person who goes into a restroom that does not match their gender assigned at birth may be sued for statutory damages of at least $10,000, even if they are aiding a person with a disability.

=== Effects of violence and intimidation ===
Recently, hate violence has increased in the United States. The Human Rights Campaign (HRC) started to document acts of "fatal violence" against transgender and gender nonconforming people in the United States in 2013. The National Coalition of Anti-Violence Programs found in 2013 that 72% of "hate-crime murder victims were trans women, and almost all were women of color." In 2015, 46% of transgender adults reported "oral harassment" and 9% reported that they had been assaulted. Most of the victims of this transphobic violence are Black gender non-conforming and trans women. Black transgender people are also more likely to face discrimination. In Chicago, fewer deaths of transgender women than homicides overall are solved by police. Transgender people are far more likely to be the victims of violent crime, as much as "four times more likely than cisgender people." Trans women are twice as likely than other trans people to experience sexual assault than other victims of violence. Hate crimes against LGBTQ students doubled across the country between 2015–2019 and again between 2021 and 2022. Overall, since 2021, the rates of violent and deadly incidents for transgender people has increased since groups began to track the numbers. In states that have passed anti-transgender legislation, the rise in hate crimes was even higher, according to The Washington Post.

Students, ranging from elementary to college, are reporting a recent increase in bullying for being part of the LGBTQ community or for being non-gender conforming. Young LGBTQ people face social stigma and often family rejection.

Despite the increases in violence, the true statistics are not fully understood. The data being used to track hate crimes against transgender and non-gender conforming people is not consistently reported due to differences in the way that some cities in the United States categorize victims of these crimes. In addition, not every organization reports hate crimes to the FBI. Many transgender people also do not report their own harassment for fear of greater repercussions in their lives, including stalking and doxing.

In the 2015 U.S. Transgender Survey, an online survey run by the National Center for Transgender Equality, 58% of respondents who had dealt in the past year with police officers who knew or thought they were transgender reported some form of mistreatment. The category covered being repeatedly referred to by the wrong gender, verbal harassment, physical assault and sexual assault.

Because of the threats of violence the Tenacious Unicorn Ranch faced, they had security on their property. All staff carried guns and visitors were provided bulletproof vests.

Threats made against children's hospitals that provide gender affirming care affect a wide range of people. During a 2022 lockdown due to transphobic threats, a mother was unable to visit her newborn in the neonatal intensive care unit (NICU). Threats of violence are also made to medical professionals who care for transgender people, especially young people.

== Link to conspiracy theories ==
Some transphobic conspiracy theories share antisemitic themes. White nationalists believe that Jews and transgender people are jointly plotting to commit a "white genocide." Both groups are portrayed as "elites" which are "controlling society" and need to be removed from it by any means necessary. The Occidental Observer wrote that the transgender rights movement was a "form of Jewish warfare."

In an opinion essay, Mitchell Zimmerman argued that tactics historically used to spread antisemitism are being applied to transgender people, and that such rhetoric lets right-wing politicians use them as a scapegoat for larger societal problems.

In Canada and the United States in the early 2020s, several conservative and far-right media outlets and personalities promulgated the litter boxes in schools hoax, stating that some schools were providing litter boxes in bathrooms to students who identified as cats or furries, in response to several school districts enacting accommodations for transgender students. Many news outlets and academic researchers have debunked the litter box claims as false.

There has also been a recent attempt "to shift the blame to the trans community itself for the violence" enacted against them and others. Anti-transgender activists have also tried to claim that transgender people are becoming more violent because 10 mass shooters out of 4,400 in the last decade in the US have identified as transgender. After it was made public that shooter who caused the Annunciation Catholic Church shooting may have identified as transgender at some point in their life, many people on social promoted the idea that transgender people are violent. On Twitter, "Within hours, the platform was flooded with wild claims about the shooter" and anti-transgender rhetoric. U.S. Representative Marjorie Taylor Greene and Homeland Security Secretary Kristi Noem also pushed the unfounded theory that transgender people are mentally ill and therefore, violent, in the aftermath of the shooting.

Misinformation about transgender people has been deliberately spread by various people in order to create a "Misinformation-Legislation Pipeline." Opinion pieces, and poorly researched and biased information are often used as the basis for targeted legislation banning gender-affirming care to transgender people. This type of false information is used by politicians to ban this type of care for transgender people, despite the lack of medical science backing the claim. Politicians are using any "currently available evidence" they can find to back their claims, despite lack of medical research behind the claims. Media and news outlets that are not careful about vetting medical evidence can help spread medical misinformation to the public.

Anti-transgender activists, such as Moms for Liberty, believe that schools and public institutions are actively indoctrinating minors to think they are transgender. Many of these activists use "parents' rights" as a way to prevent gender affirming care for their own children and others' children.

== See also ==
- Anti-gender movement
- Bathroom bill
- Feminist views on transgender topics
- History of transgender people in the United States
- Homophobia
- Lavender scare
- Legal status of transgender people#United States
- LGBT grooming conspiracy theory
- LGBT rights in the United States
- Trans bashing
- Transgender military ban in the United States
- Transgender people and military service
- Transgender people in sports
- Transphobia
- Transphobia in Norway
- Transphobia in the United Kingdom
- Gender-critical feminism
- 2020s anti-LGBTQ movement in the United States
- Transgender health care misinformation
- Anti-transgender movement in the United Kingdom
- Persecution of transgender people under the second Trump administration
- Transgender disenfranchisement in the United States
