= List of United States Supreme Court cases, volume 609 =

This is a list of all the United States Supreme Court cases from volume 609 of the United States Reports:

Note: As of December 2025, final bound volumes for the U.S. Supreme Court's United States Reports have been published through volume 585 (June 2018). Newer cases from subsequent future volumes do not yet have official page numbers and typically use three underscores in place of the page number; e.g., Example v. United States, 700 U.S. ___ (2050).

In recent years, the court has been committing to citation page numbers before publication of the bound volume. Those commitments can be viewed on their website.

Case name	Docket no.	Date decided
Blanche v. Lau	25–429	June 23, 2026
The Immigration and Nationality Act of 1952 (INA) does not require a border officer to have clear and convincing evidence that a lawful permanent resident has committed a crime involving moral turpitude before deeming the resident an applicant for admission.
Pung v. Isabella County	25–95	June 23, 2026
The proper baseline for measuring "just compensation" following a tax sale is the auction sale price, not the property's hypothetical fair market value, at least when the sale is fairly conducted in light of the country's history of tax sales
Landor v. Louisiana Department of Corrections and Public Safety	23–1197	June 23, 2026
A federal employee may not be held liable in their personal capacity under a Spending Clause statute unless that person has voluntarily and knowingly consented to answer lawsuits under the statute.
Exxon Mobil Corp. v. Corporación Cimex, S. A. (Cuba)	24–699	June 23, 2026
The Helms–Burton Act itself abrogates the sovereign immunity of Cuban agencies and instrumentalities, so plaintiffs who sue Cuban agencies or instrumentalities under the act do not need to also satisfy one of Foreign Sovereign Immunities Act's exceptions to foreign sovereign immunity.
Cisco Systems, Inc. v. Doe	24–856	June 23, 2026
Courts may not create new rights of action to remedy violations of international law under the Alien Tort Statute; neither the ATS nor the Torture Victim Protection Act of 1991 cover aiding-and-abetting offenses.
Wolford v. Lopez	24–1046	June 25, 2026
A law prohibiting licensed concealed-carry permit holders from carrying handguns on private property open to the public without the property owner's express authorization violates the Second and Fourteenth Amendments.
Mullin v. Al Otro Lado	25–5	June 25, 2026
An non-citizen "arrives in the United States" under the Immigration and Nationality Act only when they cross the border, so the INA neither entitles a non-citizen standing in Mexico to apply for asylum nor requires an immigration officer to inspect them.
Mullin v. Doe	25–1083	June 25, 2026
The Temporary Protected Status statute bars judicial review of non-constitutional claims.
Monsanto v. Durnell	24–1068	June 25, 2026
The Federal Insecticide, Fungicide, and Rodenticide Act preempts a state-law labeling requirement that differs from the federal labeling requirements imposed under FIFRA.
Trump v. Slaughter	25–332	June 29, 2026
A subordinate who exercises the President's power is subject to removal by him, and the Constitution's separation of powers prohibits Congress from requiring the President to have cause before removing a subordinate.
Trump v. Cook	25A312	June 29, 2026
The Federal Reserve historically has independence from presidential control, and the organic statute gives the Governor a set term in office and permits removal only "for cause." Thus, the statute entitles the Governor to notice and some opportunity to respond before they may be terminated by the President.
Chatrie v. United States	25–112	June 29, 2026
A geofence warrant is a search subject to the Fourth Amendment.
Watson v. Republican National Committee	24–1260	June 29, 2026
The federal election statutes do not prohibit state election officials from counting a mail-in ballot that arrives after Election Day when the ballot was postmarked by that date.
Trump v. Barbara	25–365	June 30, 2026
People born in the United States to parents unlawfully or temporarily present are "subject to the jurisdiction" of the United States and are citizens at birth under the Fourteenth Amendment's Citizenship Clause.
National Republican Senatorial Committee v. FEC	24–621	June 30, 2026
The Federal Election Campaign Act's political-party coordinated-expenditure limits violated the First Amendment, because they were not proportionate, necessary, or narrowly tailored given the other less-speech-restrictive tools available to the government to prevent circumvention.
West Virginia v. B. P. J.	24–43	June 30, 2026
Title IX allows schools to provide separate women's and men's sports teams defined by biological sex, and to do so does not violate the Equal Protection Clause. Consolidated with Little v. Hecox.
Trump v. California	26A124	August 24, 2026
National Park Service v. National Trust for Historic Preservation in the United States	26A203	August 31, 2026
National Republican Congressional Committee v. Brown	26A274	September 4, 2026

== See also ==
- List of United States Supreme Court cases by the Roberts Court
- 2025 term opinions of the Supreme Court of the United States
