= Fairness in Women's Sports Act =

US laws restricting sport participation

Map of state laws which ban transgender athletes from participating in the sport of their gender identity, as of September 2022: Law enacted which bans trans athletes from participating in sports based on their gender identity; enforces gender classifications in sports based on registered biological sex Law preventing trans athletes from participating in sport in their gender identity enacted, but blocked from enforcement via court order

The Fairness In Women's Sports Act is a common title for legislation passed in Idaho, Florida, and Arkansas that restricts participation in interscholastic, intercollegiate, intramural, club athletic teams, and any sports sponsored by a public school or university based on the assigned sex of the individual. The legislation was introduced in response to concerns that allowing transgender women to compete in women's sports would create an unfair advantage due to their physiological differences. This bill generally prohibits school athletic programs from allowing individuals whose assigned sex at birth was male to participate in programs that are for women or girls. (R-AL)

Legislation of this nature has been introduced in several states across the US and is part of a national debate over whether transgender athletes should be allowed to compete in sports teams based on their gender identity. In January 2025, the United States House of Representatives passed similar legislation titled "Protection of Women and Girls in Sports Act" that restricts transgender women from playing on women's sports teams.

Supporters of the laws argue that it is necessary to maintain fair competition and protect the integrity of women's sports, while opponents argue that they are discriminatory and unjust. Such legislation has faced legal challenge but, on June 30, 2026, the Supreme Court of the United States upheld Idaho's "Fairness in Women's Sports Act" along with similar legislation in other states in the court case Little v. Hecox.

== Background ==
‌Research shows that men have increased muscle mass and strength, different skeletal structures, and better-adapted cardiorespiratory systems that put them at an advantage during sports over women, and that male physiology cannot be reformatted by estrogen therapy in transwoman athletes because testosterone has driven permanent effects through early life exposure. Due to these biological differences, there have been debates about whether transgender athletes, specifically transgender women, should be allowed to participate with cisgender athletes, specifically cisgender women. Opponents to the participation of transgender women in women's sport believe that transgender women have an unfair advantage over cisgender women due to the differences in human physiology and that these differences are not reversed enough with hormone therapies, while supporters believe that hormone therapies and puberty blockers reduce the competitive advantages.

The first transgender athlete who was banned from competing was Renee Richards. Renee Richards was an American tennis player who was banned from competing in the US Open in 1976. The following year Renee won the right to compete in the New York Supreme Court in 1977.

In 2003 the International Olympic Committee issued its first set of guidelines regarding transgender participation in sports. It required that transgender athletes undergo gender reassignment surgery followed by at least two years of hormone therapy in order to be eligible for competition. In 2016, the IOC revised its guidelines to remove the requirement for surgery and all restrictions on female-to-male transgender athletes. Male-to-female transgender athletes were required to prove their testosterone levels below 10 nanomols per liter for at least a year prior to competing. In November 2021, the IOC removed the testosterone cut off. Instead, it recommended each sport design their own rules, including banning transgender competitors if necessary.

In March 2026, the IOC issued a new policy banning transgender women from competing in women's events. The IOC said women's events would be restricted to "biological females" whose sex would be determined by a mandatory gene test.

== Scientific basis ==
Alison Heather, a professor of physiology at the University of Otago in New Zealand studied the physiological differences between biological females and biological males and how gender-affirming hormone therapy affects those differences. She asserts there are immutable differences between the sexes in the brain, skeletal structure, and cardiorespiratory system and differences in muscle mass, strength, and aerobic capacity which can be modified through hormone therapy. Heather attributes these cardiorespiratory differences to the levels of testosterone exposure in the first years of life. While accounting for sex variation, cisgender women have a 10-12% smaller lung capacity than cisgender men and a shorter diaphragm. Similarly, a cis woman's heart is 85% the size of a cis man's heart. Additionally, Heather found biological males have an advantage in spatial ability, visual memory tasks, and perception. When compared with trans women after a year of estrogen therapy, there was no decrease in these cognitive advantages. Prolonged estrogen therapy can diminish some of these advantages. Heather also found that estrogen therapy cannot alter skeletal structure, but it does diminish muscle mass.

The British Journal of Sports Medicine published research by Dr. Timothy Roberts, Joshua Smalley, and Dale Ahrendt, MD. which examined the effects of gender-affirming hormone therapy on the athletic performance of trans men and trans women in the U.S. Air Force. They found prior to hormone therapy transgender women performed 31% more push ups, ran 1.5 miles 12% faster than cisgender women, and performed 15% more sit-ups. After two years of hormone therapy, trans women had no advantage in push-ups or sit-ups but maintained a 12% advantage in running. Additionally, prior to hormone therapy, transgender men accomplished 43% fewer push-ups than cis men and ran the 1.5 miles approximately 15% slower. After one year of hormone therapy, there was no difference between cis men and trans men in push-ups or run times, but trans men accomplished more sit-ups on average than cisgender men.

== Legislation ==
=== Idaho ===
On March 30, 2020, the Governor of Idaho signed into Law House Bill No. 500 entitled "Fairness in Women's Sports Act." The bill amended Title 33 of the Idaho Code with the addition of a new chapter 62 to be known and cited as the "Fairness in Women's Sports Act." This bill established that only female students who were biologically female at birth can participate in female sports teams and athletics. It states that public schools, any school that is a member of the Idaho High School Activities Association, and any higher education institution that is a member of the NCAA, NAIA, or NJCAA must ensure that athletic teams are designated based on biological sex, rather than gender identity, and prohibits transgender females from participating in female sports teams. The bill made Idaho the first state to outright ban transgender participation in athletics.

The bill was introduced in response to growing concerns that allowing transgender females to compete in women's sports would create an unfair advantage due to their physiological differences. Males, as the bill outlines, having naturally higher levels of testosterone, higher red blood cell counts, high hemoglobin, larger hearts, greater lung volume per body mass, and other biologically advantageous traits, are able to generate greater power and speed during physical activity than their female counterparts. Citing Neil Burton's article "The Battle of the Sexes" published in 2012, Gina Kolata's article "Men, Women, and Speed. 2 Words: Got Testosterone?" published in 2008, and the work of Doriance Lambelet Coleman among others, the bill provides extensive scientific evidence to support its claim of an inherent male advantage over females in athletic pursuits.

The legal footing of the bill is found in the U.S. Supreme court ruling in United States v. Virginia (1996) which stated that "sex classifications may be used to compensate women for particular economic disabilities suffered, promote equal employment opportunity, [and] to advance full development of the talent and capacity of our Nation's people." Emphasizing the final clause, the Idaho legislature argues that sex classifications are necessary for the "full development of the talent and capacity of our Nation's people" in the context of sports and athletics. The bill also cites two cases, Kleczek v. Rhode Island Interscholastic League, Inc. and Petrie v. Illinois High School Association, wherein the courts have recognized the existence of inherent physiological differences between males and females and the unfair advantage those differences give males over females in athletics. Thus, it is only through teams and sports designated based on biological sex that the state of Idaho could fully realize gender equality in sports and athletics.

House Bill No. 500 specifies that a "student may establish sex by presenting a signed physician's statement that shall indicate the student's sex based solely on: the student's internal and external reproductive anatomy; the student's normal endogenously produced levels of testosterone; and an analysis of the student's genetic makeup." The bill makes clear that even those using puberty blockers and cross-sex hormones if born biologically males continue to have an absolute advantage over female athletes and should be excluded from female-designated athletics.

Supporters of the bill argue that it is necessary to protect the integrity of women's sports and ensure a level playing field for female athletes. Opponents of the bill argue that it is discriminatory against transgender individuals and violates their rights to equal treatment under the law as guaranteed in the Equal Protection Clause of the U.S. Constitution.

=== Florida ===
Florida Governor Ron DeSantis signed the "Fairness In Women's Sports Act" into law on July 1, 2021. This legislation is intended to maintain fairness and opportunities for female student-athletes. Similar to the Idaho bill, the Florida Act relies on biological sex at the time of birth as declared on the student's birth certificate but does not require anatomy to be certified by a physician. The bill requires all post-primary public institutions to designate sex-specific sports and teams. The bill designates three categories of teams and sports. The first is male-sex only but may allow athletes of the female sex. The second is female-sex only and this category cannot allow students of the male sex. The third category is co-ed and accepts students of both male and female sex.

Unlike the Idaho bill, the Florida legislation does not discuss biological differences between the male and female sex, and private schools are largely exempt from the sex-designation requirement. This bill is also designed to protect public educational institutions from investigations, lawsuits, or complaints on the basis of female-only sports and teams. It allows for any students or organizations who are harmed by institutions that do not maintain female-only teams to take action for injunctive relief to file private claims within two years of the harm occurring. Harm can be defined as the deprivation of athletic opportunity, or subjection to public, athletic, or educational retaliation for reporting violations of the law. If their claims are determined to be factual they can be rewarded monetary restitution for harms that may include, physical, emotional, and psychological damage as well as attorney fees and are eligible for "any other appropriate relief" as the civil courts see fit.

=== Arkansas ===
Arkansas Senate Bill 354 To Create The Fairness in Women's Sports Act was signed into law by the Governor on March 29, 2021. SB354, which draws heavily from the Idaho House Bill No. 500, amends the Arkansas Code Title 6, Chapter 1, Subchapter 1 to create a section entitled "Fairness in Women's Sports Act." The bill, like that of Idaho's, established that only female students may participate in female sports teams and athletics, and banned the participation of transgender students in any sport or athletic pursuit designated as female.

Subsequently, on April 29, 2021, the governor signed into law Senate Bill 450 To Create The Gender Integrity Reinforcement Legislation For Sports (Girls) Act; And To Create A Legal Cause Of Action For A Violation Of The Gender Integrity Reinforcement Legislation For Sports (Girls) Act. This bill included some of the more technical language that was originally left out of SB 354 regarding the determination of gender and the defining of a "school" or "covered entity." Pulling again from Idaho House Bill, Arkansas SB 450 defines sex as a "person's immutable biological sex as objectively determined by anatomy and genetics existing at the time of birth." Senate Bill 450 also makes clear that any elementary school, high school, secondary school, or postsecondary school that is located in Arkansas and whose students or teams compete in interscholastic, intercollegiate, intramural, or club athletic teams or sports against a public school or high education institution as outlined in SB 354, must as well adhere to the bill. Thus, private schools and educational institutions also fall under the jurisdiction of the bill. The Bill also provides an avenue for legal action to be taken against those schools and "covered entities" who are found in violation of Senate Bill 354 The Fairness in Women's Sports Act.

=== Similar legislation in other states titled differently ===
Not all legislation barring the participation of transgender students in sports and athletics is entitled "The Fairness in Women's Sports Act." Similar legislation also exists under names such as "Save Women's Sports Act," "Fairness Act," and others. As it stands, in addition to Idaho, Florida, and Arkansas, legislation of this nature has passed in Mississippi [see Senate Bill 2536], Montana [see House Bill 112], Tennessee [see House Bill No. 3 Senate Bill 228], and Texas [see House Bill No. 25]. Legislation of this nature is also pending in nearly 23 other states across the U.S.

=== Similar legislations by U.S. federal government (titled differently) ===
On January 14, 2025, the United States House of Representatives passed the "Protection of Women and Girls in Sports Act" of 2025 that restricts transgender students from playing on women's sports teams. The measure amends Title IX, the federal education law that bars sex-based discrimination, to define sex as based solely on a person's reproductive biology and genetics at birth. The Republican lawmakers argued the bill will protect equal opportunity in athletics for women, mentioning that cisgender women could have physical disadvantages against transgender athletes.

The legislation faces uncertain future in the United States Senate.

== Support ==
=== Polls ===
In January 2025, a New York Times/Ipsos survey found that 79% of Americans support restricting transgender athletes from competing in women's sports. The survey asked "transgender female athletes - meaning athletes who were male at birth but who currently identify as female - do you think they should or should not be allowed to compete in women's sports?", and 79% said transgender female athletes should not be allowed to participate in women's sports. Previously, a poll conducted in 2023 by Gallup found that nearly 70% of U.S. adults say transgender athletes should be allowed to compete only on sports teams that correspond with the sexes they were assigned at birth.

== Mental health and wellness of Transgender athletes ==
One study performed a meta-analysis of 12 other papers, finding that transgender athletes experienced social prejudice and disparity in sports participation, which led to mental health issues and increased suicide rates. 7152 (33%) of the 21,565 study participants experienced prejudice when it came to playing sports and receiving medical treatment; this is a rate of 0.61 (95% confidence interval [CI]: 0.35, 0.81). However, 0.39 (95% CI: 0.19, 0.65) of the athletes were transgender and reported feeling accepted and supported by their teams. These findings showed notable distinctions in the treatment of transgender athletes in medical facilities and throughout their participation in sports.

== Criticism ==
=== Political criticism ===
These laws have all been subject to intense review and criticism. In response to Governor DeSantis signing the Florida bill into law, the Human Rights Campaign (HRC) filed a lawsuit on the basis of sex discrimination. The HRC had claimed that the law was in violation of Title IX because public schools receive federal funding. The HRC also asserted that the law was in violation of the Equal Protection Clause and Due Process Clause of the Fourteenth Amendment.

The National Collegiate Athletic Association (NCAA) also issued a statement after the Florida act became law saying they would only hold events in states "free of discrimination". As of 2022, the NCAA requires all transgender athletes to provide documentation of testosterone levels, as determined by their specific sport, four weeks before they are eligible to qualify for championships.

As a broad response to various "Fairness In Women's Sports" acts in different states, President Joe Biden issued an executive order to combat discrimination on the basis of sexual orientation and gender identity. The order reads, "Children should be able to learn without worrying about whether they will be denied access to the restroom, the locker room, or school sports."

The Athlete Ally and Women's Sports Foundation compiled a list of around 200 female athletes as signatories for a Lambda Legal brief urging the Ninth Circuit of Appeals Court to affirm the injunction against the Idaho bill. Famous athletes Billie Jean King, Megan Rapinoe, and Candace Parker were among the signatories.

=== Academic criticism ===
==== Elizabeth Sharrow ====
Elizabeth Sharrow, Associate Professor of Public Policy and History at the University of Massachusetts Amherst, examined how the politicization of transgender athletes upholds the sex binary while reinforcing male dominance and the subordination of women. In her article "Sports, Transgender Rights and the Bodily Politics of Cisgender Supremacy" she asserts these laws protect status quo gender norms in favor of cisgender people and the "androcentric world". These laws further harm all athletes when they establish the need to investigate genitalia and ignore the possibility these investigations could cause sexual trauma. Ultimately, Sharrow argues that these laws "advance a logic of cisgender supremacy".

==== Zein Murib ====
In their paper "Don't Read the Comments: Examining Social Media Discourse on Trans Athletes", Zein Murib asserts that this recent movement against transgender rights, not only in sports but in health care, schools, and public spaces, is a reflection of the threat perceived by evangelical Christian and far-right political actors against the established heteronormative, nuclear family, prototypical citizen tradition in American society. Having lost the marriage batter in Obergefell v. Hodges, the attention has turned to transgender rights. Thus, the goals of these bills are not fairness and equality but about reestablishing binary sex as natural, or as Elizabeth Sharrow calls it, cisgender supremacy.

Secondly, Murib seeks to challenge the belief that testosterone is the defining difference between male and female athletics by instead highlighting societal norms and gender stereotypes that shape the development of male and female athletes. Referring to a study done by Michael Messner on Little League Boys teams, Murib highlights that the ideas of males being innately competitive, aggressive, and less likely to cry are scripted into boys at a very young age by coaches and parents alike. Boys are consistently raised in an environment where displays of brute aggression and competitiveness, credited to their higher testosterone levels, are acceptable because they are boys. Therefore, weighting differences between male and female athletics entirely on their hormonal differences fails to recognize the gender roles and stereotypes that underpinned the formation of athletes from a young age. Maybe the issue is not whether female athletics are disadvantaged compared to male athletics due to biological differences, but the ways in which society instills passivity, submission, and softness in women from an incredibly young age.

=== Scientific criticism ===
Joshua D. Safer, MD, the executive director of the Mount Sinai Center for Transgender Medicine and Surgery asserts that transgender people are at great risk for not exercising due to a fear of discrimination or being "outed". Given the mental and physical benefits of exercise Safer believes that encouraging transgender people to participate in athletics should be an important health priority. Safer also offered expert testimony in Hecox v Little, where he attested to consensus in the medical community which posits the difference in testosterone between elite male and female athletes is what drives the differences in performance. He also asserts that many cisgender women naturally have testosterone outside what is considered normal for cisgender women. Additionally, Safer asserts that the Idaho bill unnecessarily excludes transgender girls and women who began hormone therapy before puberty. These girls have the same levels of hormones as cis girls when they go through puberty and develop "typically female" muscle and bone structure. He further maintains that after a transgender woman lowers her level of testosterone there is no reason why her physical characteristics should be treated differently than those of cisgender women as it relates to athletic performance.

An article published in Sports Medicine by Bethany Alice Jones, Jon Arcelus, Walter Pierre Bouman, and Emma Haycraft claims to be the first systematic review of literature as it concerns the participation of transgender athletes and subsequent policies. They assert there is no research that proves transgender female athletes have any advantage during any stage of their transition. They argue that the existing research on transgender athletes is mainly qualitative and thus does not lend itself to generalization.

== Supreme Court ==
In April 2020, a month after Idaho enacted the first "Fairness in Women's Sports Act", the American Civil Liberties Union, the law firm Cooley LLP, and the nonprofit organization Legal Voice on behalf of four plaintiffs: a transgender student at Boise State University who wished to compete on women's teams, a cisgender high school student concerned about invasive "sex verification" testing, and the high schooler's parents.

The plaintiffs won in district court and the Court of Appeals for the Ninth Circuit. Idaho then appealed to the United States Supreme Court. The Supreme Court consolidated the case with West Virginia v. B. P. J., a case challenging a similar law in West Virginia, and heard arguments in January 2026.

On June 30, 2026, the Supreme Court sided with the state governments. Justice Brett Kavanaugh wrote, “Consistent with Title IX and the Equal Protection Clause, we hold that the States may maintain women’s and girls’ sports for biological females. They may determine eligibility for women’s and girls’ sports based on biological sex. The Constitution and Title IX do not require an overhaul of women’s and girls’ sports throughout America.”

== See also ==
- Women in sports
- Transgender people in sports
- Transgender legal history in the United States
