= Pung v. Isabella County =

- Supreme Court of the United States

Decided June 23, 2026
- Full case name: Pung v. Isabella County
- Docket no.: 25-95
- Citations: 609 U.S. ___ (more)

Holding
- The proper baseline for measuring "just compensation" following a tax sale is the auction sale price, not the property’s hypothetical fair market value, at least when the sale is fairly conducted in light of the country's history of tax sales.

Court membership
- Chief Justice John Roberts Associate Justices Clarence Thomas · Samuel Alito; Sonia Sotomayor · Elena Kagan; Neil Gorsuch · Brett Kavanaugh; Amy Coney Barrett · Ketanji Brown Jackson

Case opinions
- Majority: Alito, joined by Roberts, Sotomayor, Kagan, Gorsuch, Kavanaugh, Barrett, Jackson; Thomas (except II-B)
- Concurrence: Sotomayor, joined by Gorsuch, Jackson
- Concurrence: Thomas (in part), joined by Gorsuch (except n.1)

Pung v. Isabella County, 609 U.S. ___ (2026), was a United States Supreme Court case in which the court held that the proper baseline for measuring "just compensation" following a tax sale is the auction sale price, not the property’s hypothetical fair market value, at least when the sale is fairly conducted in light of the country's history of tax sales.

== Background ==
The Pung family owed $2,241.93 in real-property taxes, so local tax authorities in Isabella County, Michigan, initiated foreclosure proceedings and sold the Pung home—which was assessed at $194,400 for tax purposes—for $76,008 at public auction. Michael Pung sued in federal district court, and the district court granted Pung partial summary judgment on his Fifth Amendment claim. The court held that Pung should receive only the surplus proceeds from the tax sale—i.e., the difference between the sale price and the tax debt—not the property’s fair market value. The district court also rejected Pung's claim under the Eighth Amendment Excessive Fines Clause. The Sixth Circuit Court of Appeals affirmed.

The Supreme Court granted certiorari.

== Opinion of the court ==
The Supreme Court issued an opinion on June 23, 2026.
