= Blanche v. Lau =

- Supreme Court of the United States

Argued April 22, 2026 Decided June 23, 2026
- Full case name: Todd Blanche, Acting Attorney General v. Muk Choi Lau
- Docket no.: 25-429
- Citations: 609 U.S. ___ (more)
- Argument: Oral argument
- Decision: Opinion

Case history
- Prior: 130 F. 4th 42

Holding
- The Immigration and Nationality Act (INA) does not require a border officer to have clear and convincing evidence that a lawful permanent resident has committed a crime involving moral turpitude before deeming the resident an applicant for admission.

Court membership
- Chief Justice John Roberts Associate Justices Clarence Thomas · Samuel Alito; Sonia Sotomayor · Elena Kagan; Neil Gorsuch · Brett Kavanaugh; Amy Coney Barrett · Ketanji Brown Jackson

Case opinions
- Majority: Thomas, joined by Roberts, Alito, Gorsuch, Kavanaugh, Barrett
- Dissent: Jackson, joined by Sotomayor, Kagan

Laws applied
- Immigration and Nationality Act of 1952

Blanche v. Lau, (Note: Also known as Bondi v. Lau.) 609 U.S. ___ (2026), was a United States Supreme Court case in which the court held that the Immigration and Nationality Act of 1952 (INA) does not require a border officer to have clear and convincing evidence that a Lawful Permanent Resident has committed a crime involving moral turpitude before deeming the resident an applicant for admission.

== Background ==
Under the Immigration and Nationality Act (INA), the Government can remove non-citizens applying for admission to the country if they are "inadmissible," and it can remove non-citizens already admitted if they are "deportable".

Under 8 U.S.C. §1101(a)(13)(C), lawful permanent residents generally must be regarded as already admitted to the country and usually do not have to reapply for admission when they return from temporary overseas travel. There is an exception in §1101(a)(13)(C)(v) allowing the Government to regard a lawful permanent resident as "seeking an admission" (and thus as not already admitted) if they have "committed an offense identified in section 1182(a)(2)," including a crime involving moral turpitude under §1182(a)(2)(A)(i)(I).

Muk Choi Lau, a Chinese citizen, was admitted to the United States as a lawful permanent resident in 2007. On May 7, 2012, New Jersey charged Lau with trademark counterfeiting. While awaiting trial, Lau temporarily left the United States for China. On June 15, 2012, Lau attempted to reenter the United States by presenting himself to a border officer at the airport.

Because of Lau's pending criminal charge, the border officer did not regard Lau as already admitted, but instead paroled him pending the resolution of his criminal case, meaning that Lau was allowed to physically enter the country without being formally admitted. After Lau pleaded guilty to his trademark-counterfeiting charge on June 24, 2013, the Government initiated removal proceedings against him. At those proceedings, the government charged Lau as an applicant for admission who was inadmissible for having been convicted of a crime involving moral turpitude. Lau argued that he was a lawful permanent resident already admitted and subject to removal only on deportability grounds. 130 F. 4th 42, 44. The Immigration Judge found Lau removable as charged, and the Board of Immigration Appeals affirmed.

Lau sought review in the Second Circuit Court of Appeals, which vacated the removal order. It concluded that Lau should have been regarded as already admitted upon arrival unless the border officer had "clear and convincing" evidence that Lau had committed the crime, which it held that the officer lacked. Without that evidence, the court concluded, border officers must regard lawful permanent residents as already admitted, which precludes removal on inadmissibility grounds. The court remanded to the agency without prejudice to the Government's ability to charge Lau with deportability.

Because the Second Circuit's decision conflicted with those of the Fifth and Ninth Circuits, the Supreme Court granted certiorari.

== Opinion of the court ==
In a 6-3 opinion written by Justice Clarence Thomas, who was joined by the Chief Justice, John Roberts, and Justices Samuel Alito, Neil Gorsuch, Brett Kavanaugh, and Amy Coney Barrett, the Supreme Court held that an immigration official did not require clear and convincing evidence before finding that a returning lawful permanent resident (LPR) could be deemed an "applicant for admission" under section 101(a)(13)(C)(v) of the Immigration and Nationality Act (8 U.S.C. § 1101(a)(13)(C)(v)) on grounds that the LPR had committed a crime involving moral turpitude. In addition, the Court held that the parole of Lau under section 212(d)(5)(A) of the Immigration and Nationality Act (8 U.S.C. § 1182(d)(5)(A)) was proper, since he was an "applicant for admission." Justice Ketanji Brown Jackson, who was joined by Justices Sonia Sotomayor and Elena Kagan, dissented from the opinion of Justice Thomas, "worry[ing] that the court ha[d] now handed the government a massive blank check" with its ruling in Lau.
