= Wolford v. Lopez =

- Supreme Court of the United States

Argued January 20, 2026 Decided June 25, 2026
- Full case name: Jason Wolford, et al. v. Anne E. Lopez, Attorney General of Hawaii
- Docket no.: 24-1046
- Citations: 609 U.S. 185 (more) 146 S. Ct. 2032; 2026 WL 1825723
- Decision: Opinion

Holding
- A law prohibiting licensed concealed-carry permit holders from carrying handguns on private property open to the public without the property owner's express authorization violates the Second and Fourteenth Amendments.

Court membership
- Chief Justice John Roberts Associate Justices Clarence Thomas · Samuel Alito; Sonia Sotomayor · Elena Kagan; Neil Gorsuch · Brett Kavanaugh; Amy Coney Barrett · Ketanji Brown Jackson

Case opinions
- Majority: Alito, joined by Roberts, Thomas, Gorsuch, Kavanaugh, Barrett
- Concurrence: Barrett, joined by Thomas, Gorsuch (Part II-B)
- Dissent: Kagan
- Dissent: Jackson, joined by Sotomayor

Wolford v. Lopez, 609 U.S. 185 (2026) is a United States Supreme Court case dealing with licensed concealed carry gun owners, private property, and the Second Amendment. The case centers on Hawaii's 2023 gun law that made it illegal to bring a permitted concealed gun onto certain types of private property open to the public without explicit permission from the property owner. The Supreme Court ruled 6–3 that a portion of the law in question was unconstitutional.

== Background ==
In a landmark decision regarding gun rights, the Supreme Court decided in New York State Rifle & Pistol Ass'n v. Bruen (597 U.S. 1 (2022)) that states may not impose restrictions on gun possession rights unless those laws are "consistent with the Nation's historical tradition" of gun laws.

Hawaii, which generally had some of the most restrictive gun laws in the United States, passed a new set of gun laws in 2023 to comply with the Bruen ruling. Among other aspects, the new laws included a "vampire rule", a term based on the mythos of vampires that they could not enter one's home without permission but now as applied to guns. The 2023 law made it illegal to bring a licensed concealed gun onto publicly-accessible private property, including retail and commercial properties, without previously getting permission from the property owner. Hawaii's legislature developed the new laws to address the impact of the Bruen ruling.

Portions of the new law were challenged by gun owners and the Hawaii Firearms Coalition shortly after its passage, filing their case in the United States District Court for the District of Hawaii, with attorney general Anne E. Lopez defending the state. in August 2023, Judge Leslie E. Kobayashi issued a temporary injunction blocking the state from enforcing portions of the law, including the "vampire rule", ruling that the plaintiffs had shown irreparable harm if the laws were allowed to be enforced.

The state appealed, and their appeal was heard in the Ninth Circuit alongside similar challenges to new post-Bruen gun laws passed in California. In September 2024, a three-judge panel upheld part of the laws of both states as constitutional under Bruen, but ruled that other parts of the laws were unconstitutional. Specifically related to the "vampire rule", the court upheld Hawaii's law while rejecting California's, as Hawaii's law allowed for the permission to be requested orally, in writing, or through signs placed outside the private property, while California's law only allowed for signs and was considered too restrictive. The panel also ruled that the Second Amendment did not consider the rights of gun possession with respect to private property. The Ninth Circuit denied an en banc rehearing in January 2025.

== Supreme Court ==
The original plaintiffs petitioned for writ of certiorari to the Supreme Court shortly following the denial of an en banc hearing from the Ninth Circuit. Among their arguments, the petitioners said that the Ninth Circuit's decision created a circuit split, urging the Supreme Court to resolve that disagreement among the circuit courts. The petitioners also questioned whether the Ninth Circuit correctly applied Bruen. The United States, under the second Trump administration, urged the Supreme Court to take the case so as to further refine the application of Bruen to other aspects of gun control laws.

The Supreme Court certified the petition on October 3, 2025, but limited the case to the question of how the Second Amendment applies to publicly accessible private property and not to address the question of the Bruen application. Oral hearings were held on January 20, 2026. Observers of the case predicted that the Court's conservative majority would likely rule the Hawaii law unconstitutional, dismissing claims that the law was more akin to a property right law than to gun rights.

=== Decision ===
On June 25, 2026, the Supreme Court ruled 6–3 that the "vampire rule" violated the Second and Fourteenth amendments.
