= Little v. Hecox =

2026 United States Supreme Court case

- Supreme Court of the United States

Argued January 13, 2026 Decided June 30, 2026
- Full case name: Little, Governor of Idaho, et al. v. Hecox, et al.
- Docket no.: 24-38
- Argument: Oral argument
- Opinion announcement: Opinion announcement

Case history
- Prior: Hecox v. Little, 479 F. Supp. 3d 930 (D. Idaho 2020); affirmed, Hecox v. Little, 79 F.4th 1009 (9th Cir. 2023)

Holding
- Both Title IX and the Equal Protection Clause allow schools to provide separate girls' and boys' sports teams defined by sex assigned at birth.

Court membership
- Chief Justice John Roberts Associate Justices Clarence Thomas · Samuel Alito; Sonia Sotomayor · Elena Kagan; Neil Gorsuch · Brett Kavanaugh; Amy Coney Barrett · Ketanji Brown Jackson

Case opinions
- Majority: Kavanaugh, joined by Roberts, Thomas, Alito, Gorsuch, Barrett
- Concurrence: Thomas
- Concurrence: Gorsuch
- Concur/dissent: Sotomayor, joined by Kagan, Jackson
- Concur/dissent: Jackson

Little v. Hecox (consolidated with West Virginia v. B. P. J.) is a United States Supreme Court case holding that schools can determine eligibility for women's and girls' sports teams based on sex assigned at birth. The case upheld state laws banning or restricting transgender athletes from participating on female athletic teams.

Little v Hecox challenged Idaho's 2020 "Fairness in Women's Sports Act", which explicitly defined sex based on genitalia and chromosomes rather than gender. It was argued alongside West Virginia v. B. P. J. which challenged a similar law in West Virginia.

The Court heard oral arguments on January 13, 2026. The case was significant as it tested the application of the Court's 2020 ruling in Bostock v. Clayton County—which held that Title VII's prohibition on sex discrimination includes gender identity—to the context of competitive sports and Title IX.

On June 30, 2026, the Court decided 6–3 that Idaho and West Virginia's laws did not violate the Equal Protection Clause of the 14th Amendment and in doing so, found laws banning trans girls and women from female sports to be constitutional.

== Background ==
In March 2020, the Idaho Legislature passed House Bill 500, titled the "Fairness in Women's Sports Act". Signed into law by Governor Brad Little on March 30, 2020, it made Idaho the first state to enact a categorical ban on transgender athletes competing in women's sports.

The act prohibits transgender women and girls from kindergarten through college from competing on women's sports teams, including intramural or club teams. If an athlete's sex is disputed, they must provide a signed statement from their personal healthcare provider. The law requires providers to "verify the student's biological sex as part of a routine sports physical examination" by "relying only on one or more of the following: the student's reproductive anatomy, genetic makeup, or normal endogenously produced testosterone levels."

Prior to the law's passage, the Idaho High School Activities Association and the National Collegiate Athletic Association (NCAA) permitted transgender women to compete in women's sports after completing one year of hormone treatment.

In February 2025, the NCAA revised its policy and banned transgender women from competing in women's sports in order to align with Executive Order 14201. By January 2026, over 25 U.S. states enacted laws similar to Idaho's.

=== Plaintiffs ===
The suit was filed by the American Civil Liberties Union, the law firm Cooley LLP, and the nonprofit organization Legal Voice on behalf of Lindsay Hecox, a transgender female student at Boise State University, and "Jane Doe," a cisgender female high school student who feared being subjected to the law's sex verification procedures. Hecox had been undergoing hormone therapy to lower her testosterone levels and sought to try out for the university's women's track and cross-country teams.

== Procedural history ==
=== District Court ===
The plaintiffs filed their lawsuit in April 2020. In August 2020, the United States District Court for the District of Idaho issued a preliminary injunction blocking the enforcement of the law.

Chief District Judge David Nye ruled that the Act likely violated the Equal Protection Clause because it discriminated on the basis of sex and transgender status without a sufficient justification. The court noted that the state failed to provide evidence that transgender women who suppress their testosterone maintain a significant athletic advantage over cisgender women, rendering the law's categorical ban unconstitutional under intermediate scrutiny.

=== Ninth Circuit ===
Idaho appealed to the United States Court of Appeals for the Ninth Circuit. In August 2023, a three-judge panel affirmed the preliminary injunction. The panel held that the law was subject to heightened scrutiny because it discriminated based on sex and transgender status. The court found that the "sweeping prohibition" was not substantially related to the state's interest in promoting athletic equity for cisgender women, particularly given the existing NCAA policies that Hecox followed.

Following the Supreme Court's shadow docket decision to issue an emergency stay in Labrador v. Poe (2024), which involved similar issues of state authority and gender transition, the Ninth Circuit briefly remanded the case for reconsideration but ultimately maintained the injunction.

== Supreme Court ==
On July 3, 2025, the Supreme Court granted certiorari, consolidating it with West Virginia v. B. P. J. (No. 24-43), a similar case from the United States Court of Appeals for the Fourth Circuit.

=== Mootness issue ===
Prior to oral arguments, Hecox attempted to voluntarily dismiss her claims, stating she had withdrawn from the university track team and did not intend to compete in the future. Idaho opposed the dismissal, arguing that the legal question remained "live" and required resolution to prevent future litigation under the "capable of repetition, yet evading review" doctrine. The Supreme Court deferred the question of mootness to the hearing on the merits.

=== Oral arguments ===
Oral arguments were held on January 13, 2026.

- For Idaho: Solicitor General Alan Hurst argued that the law's classification is based on birth sex, not transgender status, and is necessary because "sex is what matters in sports" due to alleged physiological advantages such as bone density and lung capacity. He contended that Title IX was originally written to protect cis females.
- For Hecox: Attorney Kathleen Hartnett argued that the law fails intermediate scrutiny because it is overbroad, excluding transgender women who have medically mitigated any supposed biological advantages through testosterone suppression. She contended that the law enforces sex stereotypes and subjects all female athletes to invasive medical scrutiny.

During questioning, Justices John Roberts, Brett Kavanaugh, and Amy Coney Barrett expressed concern over whether overturning the ban would "constitutionalize" a right for transgender athletes despite ongoing debate. Justice Neil Gorsuch expressed skepticism that the bans violated Title IX, suggesting that the 1972 statute was written with a strict definition of sex in mind.

=== Decision ===
The Supreme Court upheld the challenged state laws on June 30, 2026. In a 6–3 decision split along ideological lines, the Court ruled that laws excluding transgender athletes from women's and girls' sports teams did not violate the Equal Protection Clause of the Constitution. All nine justices agreed that the laws also did not violate Title IX, though the conservative and liberal justices used different legal reasons for reaching that agreement. The ruling was described as "narrow" by legal experts and was noted to only answer whether states are allowed to ban trans women from women's sports, but the ruling does not require states to ban it. The ruling also emphasized that sports are a distinct issue and that the same logic does not automatically apply to other transgender related contexts like restroom access.

==== Majority ====
Writing for the majority, Justice Brett Kavanaugh, joined by Justices John Roberts, Clarence Thomas, Samuel Alito, Neil Gorsuch, and Amy Coney Barrett, explained that although Title IX prohibits "discrimination on the basis of sex", its implementing regulations "expressly permit schools to maintain separate teams for 'members of each sex.'" Kavanaugh further argued that "Title IX regulations allowed separate sports teams precisely because of the biological differences between the sexes" and opined that "the term 'sex' in Title IX, the Javits Amendment, and the Title IX regulations cannot plausibly be interpreted to refer to anything other than biological sex."

In a short concurring solo opinion, Justice Clarence Thomas wrote "Men and boys with gender dysphoria are not women or girls even if they believe that they are. Sex is an immutable, 'biological' characteristic; it is binary; and 'man' and 'woman,' 'boy' and 'girl,' are the terms that correspond to adults and children of each sex. To use language to obscure reality—to show 'indifference regarding the truth'—is to lie to the public and cease to treat our fellow citizens 'as equal[s].'"

Justice Gorsuch also wrote a solo concurring opinion in which he focused on the history of Title IX and its power and use in the Constitution's spending clause, noting that the recipient of funds spent by Congress under Title IX "must 'voluntarily and knowingly' assent to those conditions for them to bear any legal force." Gorsuch said, "[n]othing in Title IX clearly and unambiguously alerts funding recipients that they are prohibited from restricting a school-sponsored sports team to biological women or girls."

Addressing the plaintiffs' constitutional claims, the Court applied intermediate scrutiny, which requires that a sex-based classification be substantially related to an important government objective. The Court concluded that the states had important interests in promoting safety and competitive fairness and that limiting women's and girls' sports to those assigned female at birth was substantially related to achieving those objectives. Kavanaugh wrote that this remained true even for transgender athletes who, like Pepper-Jackson, had taken puberty blockers or hormone therapy. He argued that "an enormous practical and administrability problem would arise if courts suddenly had to make such individualized exemptions" and that legislatures, rather than courts, should be responsible for designing appropriate policies for transgender athletes in different circumstances.

==== Dissent ====
Justice Sonia Sotomayor, joined by Justices Elena Kagan and Ketanji Brown Jackson, wrote a partial dissent. She narrowly agreed that the laws did not violate Title IX due to Pepper-Jackson's legal team having previously agreed with the state during oral arguments that "sex" means "biological sex" in Title IX and thus there was no violation. In her dissent, Sotomayor argued that, despite this, the majority should not have broadly ruled that "sex" in Title IX applies only to biological sex. Sotomayor said she would have remanded the case to the lower courts for additional fact-finding regarding Pepper-Jackson's constitutional claim. She argued that there were unresolved factual and scientific disputes over whether transgender athletes like Pepper-Jackson, who had not undergone male puberty, possessed a competitive advantage over cisgender girls. In her view, resolving that question was necessary to determine whether the state had a sufficiently important interest in excluding Pepper-Jackson from girls' sports.

Additionally, Justice Sotomayor opposed categorical bans and instead supported an "as applied" approach. She also criticized the majority for causing suffering on those it disfavors without giving them the fair and full chance to litigate their case and for generalizing people based on sex stereotypes and ignoring subcategories of individuals who may not fit those stereotypes and instead argued for an individualized approach saying "The ban eliminated this individualized approach in favor of categorical exclusion" and "the majority applies its diminished view of equal protection to the sports context today. One can only hope that the same misguided approach does not and will not extend to other contexts tomorrow."

In a separate dissent, Justice Jackson criticized the majority's interpretation of Title IX saying, "the majority is wrong to suggest that the term 'sex' in Title IX 'cannot plausibly be interpreted to refer to anything other than biological sex'" and that the majority's interpretation "might well run afoul of Title IX properly construed." Jackson also noted that a trans woman being penalized due to harmful stereotypes have "experienced discrimination 'on the basis of sex' just as much as a cisgender woman has, no matter that the transgender woman's behavior matches expectations of her sex assigned at birth".

== Reception ==
The ruling was praised by the Trump administration, Republican politicians and conservative groups like Independent Women's Law Center and the Family Research Council which called it "a good first step" in their broader goal of getting Obergefell v. Hodges overturned.

The conservative advocacy groups, Alliance Defending Freedom, America First Legal and Defending Education vowed to use the ruling to push for bans on trans athletes in Democrat-controlled states. Alliance Defending Freedom noted that they were already backing several cases making their way through lower courts attempting to not just allow bans on trans athletes, but require it, and also extend the logic in the court's decision to other areas like restroom access.

By contrast, the ruling was condemned by LGBT rights groups, some human rights groups, and several Democrat politicians including GLAD Law, Lambda Legal, the American Civil Liberties Union, the Human Rights Campaign and GLAAD.

== See also ==
- Bostock v. Clayton County (2020)
- United States v. Virginia (1996)
- Transgender rights in the United States
- United States v. Skrmetti
