= Neel Burton =

British psychiatrist and author

Neel Burton (born in Mauritius) is a British psychiatrist, philosopher, writer, and educator. He is an author of several books, including Psychiatry (2006), Living with Schizophrenia (with Phil Davison, 2007), The Meaning of Madness (2008), Master your Mind (2009), The Art of Failure – The Anti Self-Help Guide (2010), Growing from Depression: A Self-Help Guide (2010), Hide and Seek: The Psychology of Self-Deception (2012), Heaven and Hell: The Psychology of the Emotions (2015), and Hypersanity: Thinking Beyond Thinking (2019).
