= West Virginia v. B. P. J. =

- Supreme Court of the United States

Argued January 13, 2026 Decided June 30, 2026
- Full case name: West Virginia, et al., Petitioners v. B. P. J., By Her Next Friend and Mother, Heather Jackson
- Docket no.: 24-43
- Citations: 609 U.S. ___ (2026) (more)
- Opinion announcement: Opinion announcement

Holding
- Both Title IX and the Equal Protection Clause allow schools to provide separate girls' and boys' sports teams defined by sex assigned at birth.

Court membership
- Chief Justice John Roberts Associate Justices Clarence Thomas · Samuel Alito; Sonia Sotomayor · Elena Kagan; Neil Gorsuch · Brett Kavanaugh; Amy Coney Barrett · Ketanji Brown Jackson

Case opinions
- Majority: Kavanaugh, joined by Roberts, Thomas, Alito, Gorsuch, Barrett
- Concurrence: Thomas
- Concurrence: Gorsuch
- Concur/dissent: Sotomayor, joined by Kagan, Jackson
- Concur/dissent: Jackson

West Virginia v. B. P. J. (consolidated with Little v. Hecox), 609 U.S. ___ (2026), is a United States Supreme Court case holding that schools can provide separate girls' and boys' sports teams defined by sex assigned at birth. The case upheld state laws that banned or restricted transgender women athletes from participating in women's school sports teams.

In April 2024, the Fourth Circuit held that a West Virginia law barring transgender girls and women from participating on girls' and women's sports teams was unconstitutional. The case was argued on January 13, 2026, alongside Little v. Hecox, which challenges an Idaho law restricting girls' and women's teams to students who are assigned female at birth. The arguments took place amid widespread adoption of similar state laws and related national policy disputes.

On June 30, 2026, the Court ruled unanimously that allowing different sports teams for boys and girls does not violate Title IX and 6–3 that Idaho and West Virginia's laws did not violate the Equal Protection Clause of the Constitution by using sex assigned at birth as a requirement for female sports teams. Sotomayor, Kagan, and Jackson were concurring in the judgment in part and dissenting in part.

== Background and procedural history ==
In 2021, West Virginia passed the "Save Women's Sports Act", which restricts participation on public school sports teams "based solely on the individual's reproductive biology and genetics at birth." The law prohibited trans women and girls from joining sports teams designated for female athletes.

Becky Pepper-Jackson, a 12-year-old transgender girl taking puberty blockers, brought an as applied challenge against the state, arguing that the law violated her rights as it applied to her individual circumstances. According to her case, she "has not experienced and will not experience endogenous puberty" and, because of her hormonal therapies, would instead develop the "physiological characteristics consistent with hormonal puberty of typical girls."

While Pepper-Jackson did not dispute that male athletes typically possess inherent athletic advantages over female athletes, she contended that this generalization did not apply to transgender girls using hormonal therapies to avoid endogenous male puberty. She argued that such transgender girls did not have athletic advantages over cisgender girls and thus, that banning them from girls' sports teams was unreasonable. Pepper-Jackson challenged the law on Fourteenth Amendment, Equal Protection Clause, and Title IX sex discrimination grounds.

U.S. District Judge Joseph R. Goodwin originally blocked the law but, after full briefing, ultimately concluded the state's ban was lawful. A divided panel of the Fourth Circuit put the law on hold pending further review. West Virginia requested the Supreme Court of the United States to lift the hold, but the court denied the request on April 6, 2023. Justices Samuel Alito and Clarence Thomas dissented from the denial.

== Court of Appeals ==
On April 17, 2024, the United States Court of Appeals for the Fourth Circuit overturned the lower court decision and ruled that the "Save Women's Sports Act" was unconstitutional. The Court held the law preventing transgender girls from playing on girls' teams was not "substantially related to an important government interest." The Court also found "B.P.J. has shown that applying the Act to her would treat her worse than people to whom she is similarly situated, deprive her of any meaningful athletic opportunities, and do so on the basis of sex." The opinion states "we do not hold that state officials are forbidden from creating separate sports teams for boys and girls or that lack power to police the line drawn". It additionally provides that Title IX does not "require schools to allow every transgender girl to play on girls teams".

On July 11, 2024, West Virginia appealed the Fourth Circuit's decision to the U.S. Supreme Court. The high court granted the petition on July 3, 2025.

== Supreme Court ==
=== Oral arguments ===
The Court heard oral argument on January 13, 2026. The Solicitor General D. John Sauer participated as amicus curiae in support of West Virginia. News coverage of the argument reported that the Court's conservative majority appeared skeptical of the challengers' claims and emphasized fairness rationales and Title IX's longstanding accommodation of sex-separated teams, while the Court's liberal justices raised concerns about discrimination and suggested the possibility of narrower, as-applied relief or further factfinding in the lower courts. Pepper-Jackson argued that she does not have the competitive advantages the state attributes to a testosterone-based puberty because she began medical treatment earlier and did not undergo testosterone puberty.

=== Decision ===
The Supreme Court upheld the challenged state laws on June 30, 2026. In a 6–3 decision split along ideological lines, the Court ruled that laws excluding transgender athletes from women's and girls' sports teams did not violate the Equal Protection Clause of the Constitution. All nine justices agreed that the laws also did not violate Title IX, though the conservative and liberal justices used different legal reasons for reaching that agreement. The ruling was described as "narrow" by legal experts and was noted to only answer whether states are allowed to ban trans women from women's sports, but the ruling does not require states to ban it. The ruling also emphasized that sports are a distinct issue and that the same logic does not automatically apply to other transgender related contexts like restroom access.

==== Majority ====
Writing for the majority, Justice Brett Kavanaugh, joined by Justices John Roberts, Clarence Thomas, Samuel Alito, Neil Gorsuch, and Amy Coney Barrett, explained that although Title IX prohibits "discrimination on the basis of sex", its implementing regulations "expressly permit schools to maintain separate teams for 'members of each sex.'" Kavanaugh further argued that "Title IX regulations allowed separate sports teams precisely because of the biological differences between the sexes" and opined that "the term 'sex' in Title IX, the Javits Amendment, and the Title IX regulations cannot plausibly be interpreted to refer to anything other than biological sex."

In a short concurring solo opinion, Justice Clarence Thomas wrote "Men and boys with gender dysphoria are not women or girls even if they believe that they are. Sex is an immutable, 'biological' characteristic; it is binary; and 'man' and 'woman,' 'boy' and 'girl,' are the terms that correspond to adults and children of each sex. To use language to obscure reality—to show 'indifference regarding the truth'—is to lie to the public and cease to treat our fellow citizens 'as equal[s].'"

Justice Gorsuch also wrote a solo concurring opinion in which he focused on the history of Title IX and its power and use in the Constitution's spending clause, noting that the recipient of funds spent by Congress under Title IX "must 'voluntarily and knowingly' assent to those conditions for them to bear any legal force." Gorsuch said, "[n]othing in Title IX clearly and unambiguously alerts funding recipients that they are prohibited from restricting a school-sponsored sports team to biological women or girls."

Addressing the plaintiffs' constitutional claims, the Court applied intermediate scrutiny, which requires that a sex-based classification be substantially related to an important government objective. The Court concluded that the states had important interests in promoting safety and competitive fairness and that limiting women's and girls' sports to those assigned female at birth was substantially related to achieving those objectives. Kavanaugh wrote that this remained true even for transgender athletes who, like Pepper-Jackson, had taken puberty blockers or hormone therapy. He argued that "an enormous practical and administrability problem would arise if courts suddenly had to make such individualized exemptions" and that legislatures, rather than courts, should be responsible for designing appropriate policies for transgender athletes in different circumstances.

==== Dissent ====
Justice Sonia Sotomayor, joined by Justices Elena Kagan and Ketanji Brown Jackson, wrote a partial dissent. She narrowly agreed that the laws did not violate Title IX due to Pepper-Jackson's legal team having previously agreed with the state during oral arguments that "sex" means "biological sex" in Title IX and thus there was no violation. In her dissent, Sotomayor argued that, despite this, the majority should not have broadly ruled that "sex" in Title IX applies only to biological sex. Sotomayor said she would have remanded the case to the lower courts for additional fact-finding regarding Pepper-Jackson's constitutional claim. She argued that there were unresolved factual and scientific disputes over whether transgender athletes like Pepper-Jackson, who had not undergone male puberty, possessed a competitive advantage over cisgender girls. In her view, resolving that question was necessary to determine whether the state had a sufficiently important interest in excluding Pepper-Jackson from girls' sports.

Additionally, Justice Sotomayor opposed categorical bans and instead supported an "as applied" approach. She also criticized the majority for causing suffering on those it disfavors without giving them the fair and full chance to litigate their case and for generalizing people based on sex stereotypes and ignoring subcategories of individuals who may not fit those stereotypes and instead argued for an individualized approach saying "The ban eliminated this individualized approach in favor of categorical exclusion" and "the majority applies its diminished view of equal protection to the sports context today. One can only hope that the same misguided approach does not and will not extend to other contexts tomorrow."

In a separate dissent, Justice Jackson criticized the majority's interpretation of Title IX saying, "the majority is wrong to suggest that the term 'sex' in Title IX 'cannot plausibly be interpreted to refer to anything other than biological sex'" and that the majority's interpretation "might well run afoul of Title IX properly construed." Jackson also noted that a trans woman being penalized due to harmful stereotypes have "experienced discrimination 'on the basis of sex' just as much as a cisgender woman has, no matter that the transgender woman's behavior matches expectations of her sex assigned at birth".

== Reception ==
The ruling was praised by the Trump administration, Republican politicians and conservative groups like Independent Women's Law Center and the Family Research Council which called it "a good first step" in their broader goal of getting Obergefell v. Hodges overturned.

The conservative advocacy groups, Alliance Defending Freedom, America First Legal and Defending Education vowed to use the ruling to push for bans on trans athletes in Democrat-controlled states. Alliance Defending Freedom noted that they were already backing several cases making their way through lower courts attempting to not just allow bans on trans athletes, but require it, and also extend the logic in the court's decision to other areas like restroom access.

By contrast, the ruling was condemned by LGBT rights groups, human rights groups and Democrat politicians including GLAD Law, Lambda Legal, the American Civil Liberties Union, the Human Rights Campaign and GLAAD.

James Dale, the plaintiff in the 2000 United States Supreme Court case Boy Scouts of America v. Dale in which the court ruled that the Boy Scouts of America (BSA) could lawfully exclude a homosexual person from membership, wrote an open letter to B. P. J. comparing her loss at the Supreme Court to his 26 years prior, sympathizing with her and noting that in the years since his loss gay rights had become much more accepted, writing "Someday, I believe, America will understand with the same clarity why excluding transgender kids is wrong."

Ian Millhiser wrote, "B.P.J. isn’t just a lesson for trans rights advocates, it is a lesson for nearly everyone on the political left. (...) If you are an advocate for a left-leaning cause of any kind, it is a good idea to stay far away from this Supreme Court if you can."

== Analysis ==
The editorial board of The Wall Street Journal opined that the decision limited the reach of Bostock v. Clayton County (2020), a landmark Supreme Court case holding that Title VII's protections against discrimination based on sex in the workplace also protect transgender employees. Kavanaugh wrote that because Title VII governs employment while Title IX concerns sports, "the two factual contexts are vastly different." According to The Wall Street Journal, this distinction could make it more difficult to apply Bostock's precedent "to other sex-segregated spaces like locker rooms or bathrooms."

== See also ==
- LGBT rights in West Virginia
- Sex–gender distinction
- Transgender people in sports
- Transgender rights in the United States
- List of LGBTQ-related cases in the United States Supreme Court
- 2020s anti-LGBTQ movement in the United States
- United States v. Skrmetti
