= Tenacious Unicorn Ranch =

Queer and transgender community and ranch

- Established: 2018; 8 years ago
- Founder: Penny Logue
- Defunct: 2023
- Location: Custer County, Colorado, U.S.

The Tenacious Unicorn Ranch LLC is a business which served as a queer and transgender community and working ranch in Custer County, Colorado, United States for several years in the early 2020s. Located in a conservative part of Colorado, members of the ranch claimed that they carried firearms and wore body armor due to harassment and threats of violence against the community, particularly from local right-wing militias. The Tenacious Unicorn Ranch primarily raised alpaca, but was also home to several other kinds of livestock.

== History ==
Penellope "Penny" Logue founded the Tenacious Unicorn Ranch in 2018, and she co-owned it along with Bonnie Nelson and J Stanley. Logue began the project in the aftermath of the 2016 United States presidential election, fearing and responding to increased hostility and violence from society and the government towards transgender and queer people. The ranch aimed to provide a safe place for transgender and non-binary people who struggled to find housing, employment, or happiness. Speaking to the Socialist Rifle Association Podcast, Logue said, "We really saw the writing on the wall with the way that rhetoric was changing so quickly, how nasty the ramp-up to the election was, how damaging it was for queer people specifically. We didn’t really think it was going to get any better, so we tried to start coming up with ways to not only save ourselves, but bring that kind of safety net to other queer people as well." Logue and her partners adopted a herd of alpaca and moved to the ranch in Colorado. Logue had grown up in Longmont, Colorado, where she had worked on a farm with her grandfather, a professional programmer, on weekends.

Originally based in a rented ranch in Larimer County, Colorado, the Tenacious Unicorn Ranch bought and moved south to a 40-acre (16 ha) plot near Westcliffe in Custer County, Colorado, in March 2020.

The Tenacious Unicorn Ranch LLC fell into delinquent status with the State of Colorado in 2020 for failing to file a periodic report, and again in 2022, which has remained unchanged since. On April 13, 2024, the registered agent resigned and no agent has been appointed since.

== Community ==
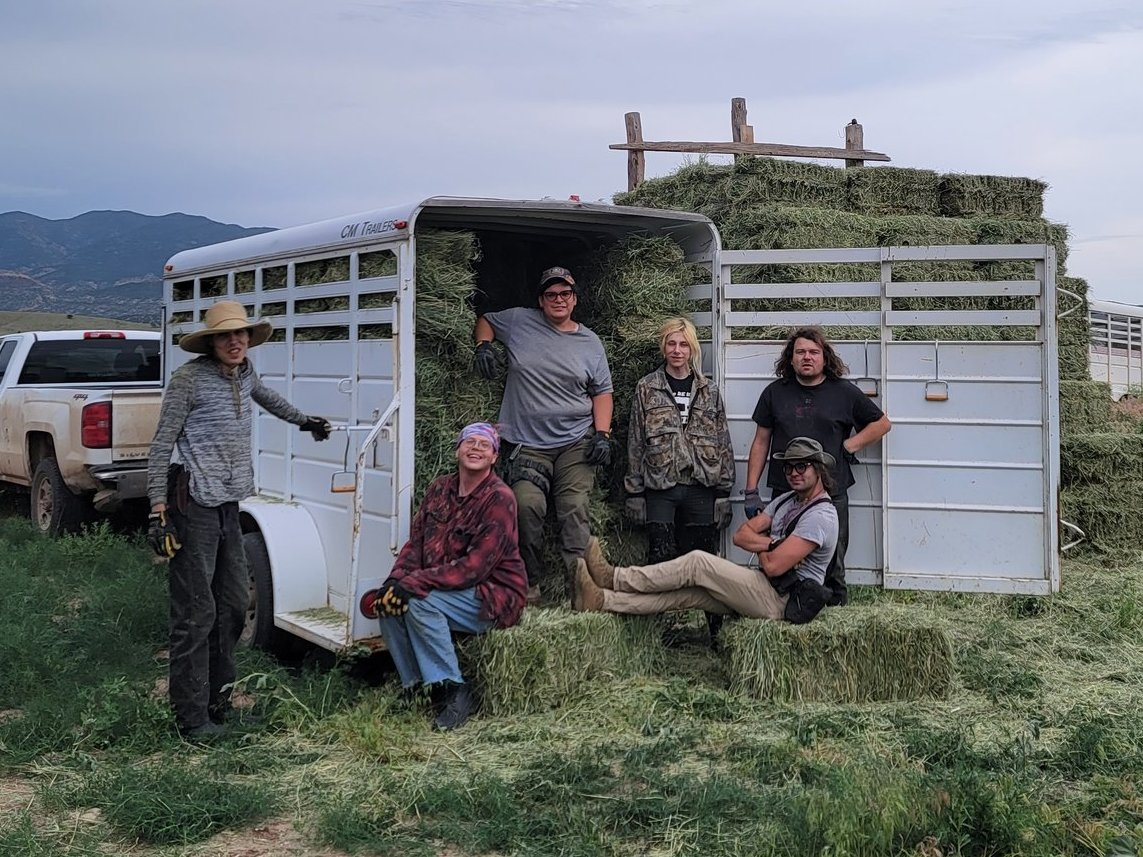
Ranchers at the Tenacious Unicorn Ranch

Members of the Tenacious Unicorn Ranch were anarchists, leftists, and antifascists. As of March 2020, the ranch had nine residents. The ranch's owners had said they intended to expand their community by buying more land and increasing the number of people who could live in their existing building.

The Tenacious Unicorn Ranch often shared photos of their alpaca and other animals on social media, and their social media presence attracted volunteers and visitors. Media coverage of the ranch also increased its visibility among the queer community, and attracted visitors and volunteers.

Logue and Nelson sought to build a sustainable business through the sale of agricultural products. They also raised money through online fundraising. In addition to maintaining the ranch, the group helped with community projects including establishing a recycling program at the county landfill and starting a community garden.

The Tenacious Unicorn Ranch also floated plans to help other queer collectives start similar projects. In July 2021, Logue said they intended to help a group create an Indigenous queer ranch in Arizona by cosigning for the property and providing the group with a herd of alpaca. Another queer collective inspired by the Tenacious Unicorn Ranch was independently seeking to establish a farm in Bellingham, Washington, with plans to buy five acres in August 2021.

== Ranch ==
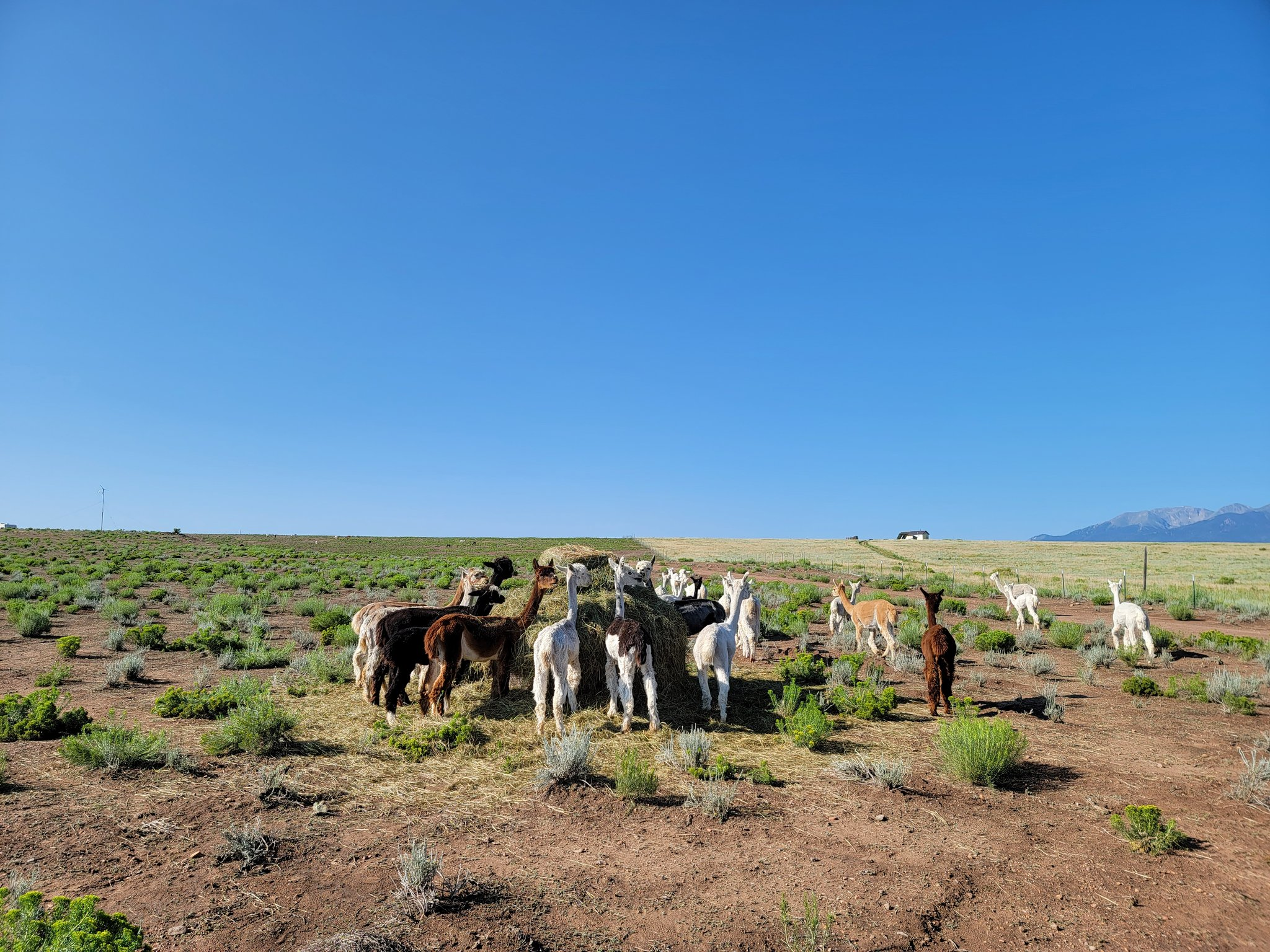
A herd of the ranch's alpaca

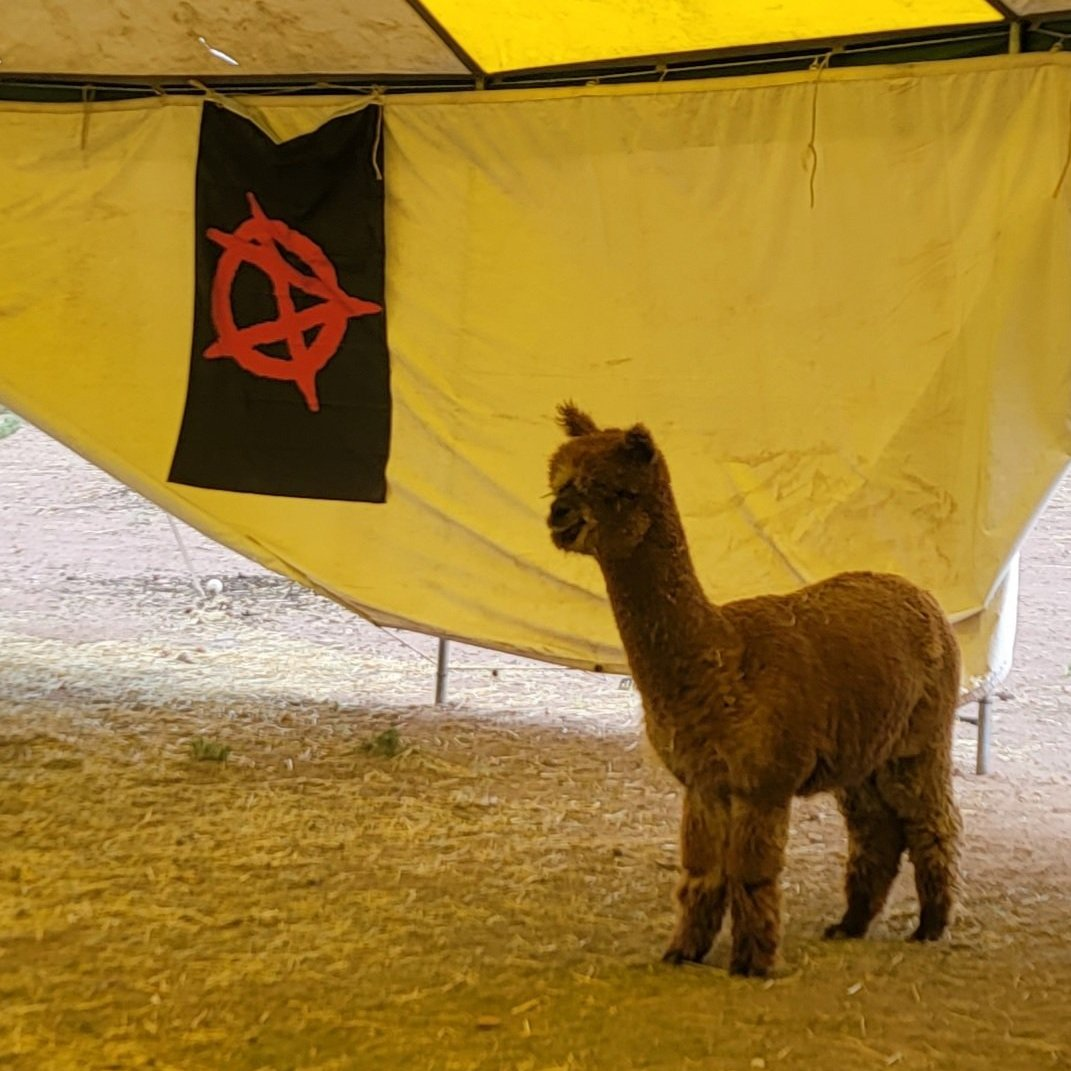
An alpaca on the ranch

=== Buildings and infrastructure ===
A solar-powered geodesic dome referred to as the Earthship provided the primary living space on the ranch. Residents built or relocated other small buildings and trailers for additional living space. The ranch operated entirely off the grid, powered by solar and wind energy as well as gasoline-powered generators.

=== Livestock ===
The Tenacious Unicorn Ranch primarily raised alpaca, most of which were donated or rescued. They processed the alpacas' wool into yarn and sold it online to help support the ranch. They also pooled fiber with other local alpaca farmers to have it processed into hats and socks. In 2021, the ranch had almost 170 alpaca, producing around 2,000 pounds (910 kg) of alpaca wool each year. They also raised sheep, goats, chickens, and ducks, cats, and dogs.

== Harassment and threats against the ranch ==
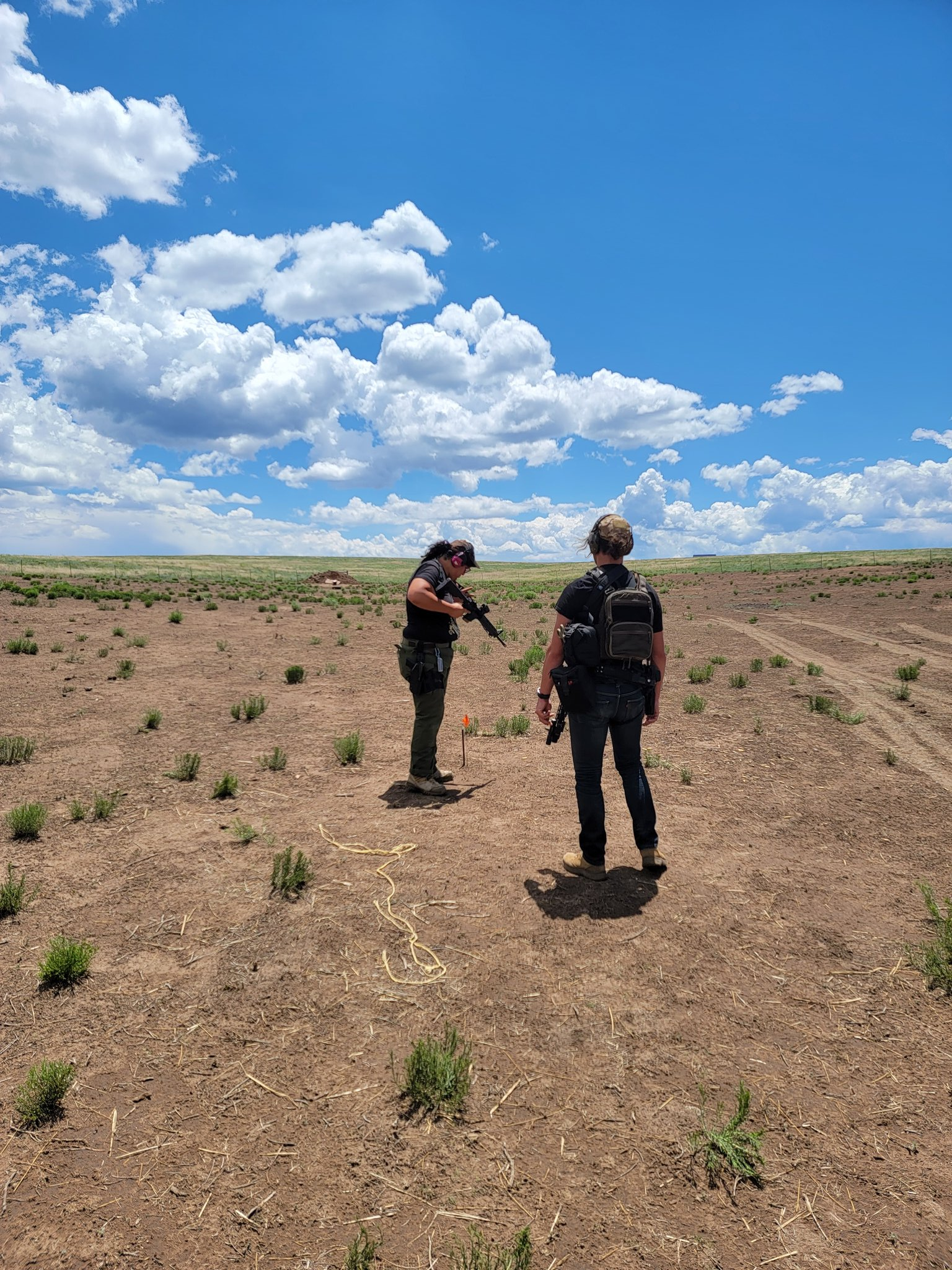
Armed members of the ranch

The ranch was located in a generally conservative part of Colorado, where 70% of the population voted for Donald Trump in both the 2016 and 2020 elections. Although the ranch's members said that the community was largely welcoming and supportive, they faced harassment and threats from a radical minority of community members including local right-wing militia groups, as well as online.

On July 4, 2020, Logue and Nelson traveled to Westcliffe for coffee and errands and saw a group protesting the COVID-19 pandemic-related cancellation of the town's Independence Day parade. Many protesters were heavily armed and armored; some carried Confederate flags or banners for the far-right militia group the Three Percenters, and one person wore a shirt with the white supremacist slogan "It's OK to be White". The ranchers posted about the event on social media; Logue tweeted that day, "The Fourth of July parade in #westcliffe was a Nazi propaganda parade, I've never been so unsettled". According to Logue, this marked the beginning of the often transphobic harassment and threats of violence towards the ranch and its community.

Threats intensified after the ranch became more widely known following increased media coverage in early 2021, and Logue said they began receiving death threats. According to the High Country News, it was rumored locally that militias were "patrolling" the borders of the ranch to "establish dominance". There were several incidents in which residents claimed they were followed in their truck or armed intruders were discovered on the property, although they declined to report any incident to the Custer County Sheriff's Department. Residents began to carry firearms and wear bulletproof vests while tending to the farm. The ranch's members and a group of volunteers began running 24-hour guards along the perimeter of the property, and according to Nelson, a patrolling guard encountered armed intruders trespassing on the property on March 6, 2021. After posting on social media about the incident, the ranch received widespread support, including from a local chapter of the Socialist Rifle Association, which donated body armor for all residents. The ranch subsequently raised $100,000 with a GoFundMe campaign, which allowed them to replace the patrols with six-foot-tall (1.8 m) fencing, lights, and security cameras.

According to Logue, the threats became less intense in mid-2021. Logue says that several residents had developed post-traumatic stress disorder as a result of the period, which she described as "taking a group of people and dropping them into what is a potential combat zone everywhere they go in their home".

=== Interactions with the Custer County Sheriff's Department ===
The Tenacious Unicorn Ranch did not report the threats to the Custer County Sheriff's Department, which they said was due to a 2015 video of Sheriff Shannon Byerly speaking at a rally held on the anniversary of the founding of the far-right anti-government Oath Keepers militia group. In the speech, he discussed gun rights and his beliefs that some leaders in the United States were demonstrating signs of "tyranny". In July 2021, Byerly confirmed to Reuters that he spoke at the rally, and said he was not a member of the Oath Keepers.

According to Byerly, his office investigated reports of threats against the Tenacious Unicorn Ranch after seeing media coverage of the incidents, but found no evidence. He said that the department did not contact any members of the ranch as a part of the investigation, claiming that his deputies felt unwelcome at the community. In an interview with Reuters, Byerly initially described an April encounter between his deputies and members of the ranch that occurred when deputies visited to investigate a car accident. Byerly described multiple armed and "confrontational" ranch residents, and alleged that they barred deputies from entering. After Reuters reviewed body camera footage of the alleged incident and found that it involved a single unarmed ranch resident who greeted deputies, answered questions, and offered contact information, Reuters reported that Byerly "acknowledged in a subsequent interview he had been mistaken in his account".

== Local reception ==
The majority of the local community was welcoming and supportive of the Tenacious Unicorn Ranch. The Associated Press quoted a Westcliffe resident and friend of the ranchers, who attributed local opposition to the ranchers to "'a small radical minority' that feels like they have more power in town than they do". According to Colorado's High Country News, the ranchers' presence helped to "[galvanize] other local rural progressives", who began expressing support for the ranchers and antifascism after the ranchers' social media posts about the July 2020 Westcliffe parade cancellation protest.

A January 2021 profile of the Tenacious Unicorn Ranch in the High Country News quoted Logue describing the July 2020 Westcliffe protest as a "fascist parade". The Sangre De Cristo Sentinel, a local conservative publication which has published transphobic material, republished the High Country News article with long editor's notes which called the article "very, very disturbing" and described the Tenacious Unicorn Ranch as a "hypocritical bunch of hate-filled xenophobes". The writer later walked back some of these comments in an interview in which he said that the ranchers were good people, and that he had felt they were attacking the community when they described the parade as "fascist".

The Sangre De Cristo Sentinel also published a letter to the editor in March 2021 which accused the ranchers of exaggerating the harassment they received in order to earn money via online fundraising. Logue criticized the writer for characterizing the problem "not [as] the abuse, but ... that they went public with the abuse", and said that the ranch earns most of its money from selling goods and services rather than from online fundraising.

== See also ==
- Mission: Wolf
