= Bathroom bill =

Laws restricting bathroom access

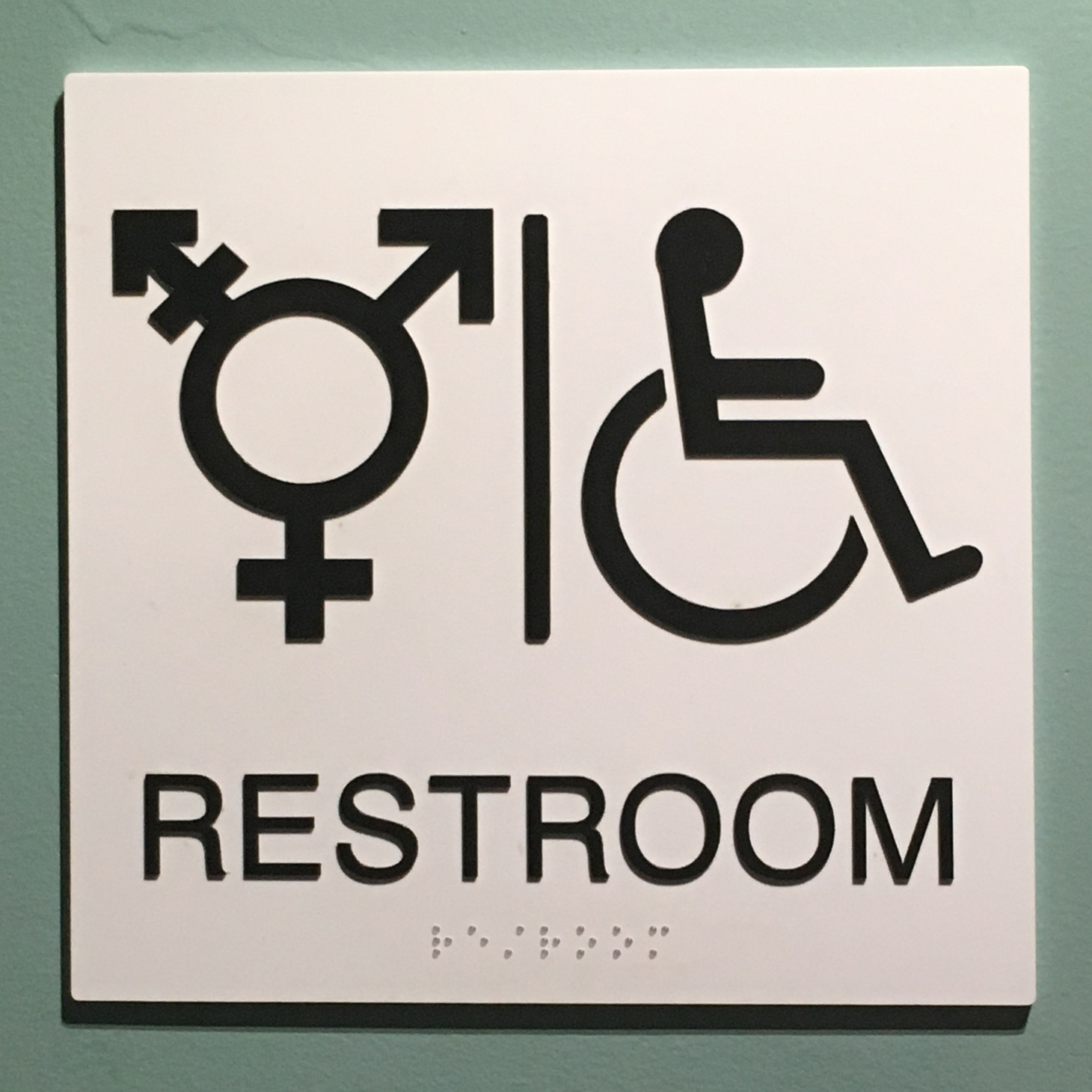
All gender restroom sign in San Diego Natural History Museum

A bathroom bill is the common name for legislation or a statute that defines access to public toilets by gender or transgender identity. Bathroom bills affect access to sex-segregated public facilities for an individual based on a determination of their sex as defined in some specific way, such as their sex as assigned at birth, their sex as listed on their birth certificate, or the sex that corresponds to their gender identity. A bathroom bill can either be inclusive or exclusive of transgender individuals, depending on the aforementioned definition of their sex.

Proponents of the bills argue that such legislation is necessary to maintain privacy, protect modesty held by most cisgender people, prevent voyeurism, assault, molestation, and rape, and ensure psychological comfort. Critics of the bills, including advocacy groups and researchers, argue that such legislation does not enhance safety for cisgender people and may increase risks for transgender and gender non-conforming cisgender people. The UCLA's Williams Institute has tracked prevalence of crimes in bathrooms since the passage of various protections for the transgender population and has found that there has been no significant change in the number of crimes. Organizations such as the American Medical Association, the American Psychological Association, and the American Academy of Pediatrics have expressed opposition to trans-exclusive bathroom bills, citing concerns about their impact on public health and safety.

Moreover, Vox found that "there's no evidence that nondiscrimination laws—and other policies that also let trans people use the bathroom for their gender identity—lead to sexual assault in bathrooms and locker rooms" and Media Matters "confirmed with experts and officials in 12 states and 17 school districts with protections for trans people that they had no increases in sex crimes after they enacted their policies".

The film Growing Up Coy documented a landmark 2013 case in which the Colorado Civil Rights Division ruled in favor of allowing transgender six-year-old Coy Mathis to use the girls' bathroom at her elementary school in Fountain, Colorado. The case has been credited with setting off a wave of bathroom bills across the United States in the years following. Though guidance was issued by the Obama administration in 2016 stating that schools which receive federal money must treat a student's gender identity as their sex (for example, in regard to bathrooms), this policy was revoked by the first Trump administration in 2017.

== United States ==
The maps below are out of date please refer to the list further down for more up to date information.

State-level enforcement mechanisms in the U.S. for transgender bathroom restrictions Criminal penalties for individuals (misdemeanor with jail time and/or fine); administrative and civil penalties for covered facilities ^{2} Administrative and civil penalties against covered facilities (civil lawsuits and loss of state funding) Civil penalties against covered facilities (civil lawsuits or fines) Administrative penalties against covered facilities (loss of state funding) Declaratory or injunctive relief against covered facilities Complaint-based enforcement against covered facilities No statutory penalty; covered facilities expected to comply voluntarily ^{2} / ^{3} No transgender bathroom restrictions ^{1} Notes:^{1} Montana's ban is currently blocked and unenforceable by court orders in the case of Plaintiffs v. State of Montana (Montana).^{2} In Florida, Montana, Ohio, and Wyoming, the bathroom bans don't just apply to government buildings—they also affect some private places. All other states with similar laws only apply them to government-run spaces like schools or public offices.^{3} Virginia's bathroom restrictions aren't based on a law passed by the legislature—instead, they come from a state agency policy that schools are required to follow. As of June 4, 2024, the following nine Virginia school districts have adopted bathroom restrictions in alignment with the model policy: Chesapeake City Public Schools, Hanover County Public Schools, Lynchburg City Public Schools, Newport News Public Schools, Pittsylvania County Public Schools, Roanoke County Public Schools, Rockingham County Public Schools, Spotsylvania County Public Schools, and Virginia Beach City Public Schools.

State-level restrictions in the United States on transgender people's use of public restrooms and facilities, showing where laws limit access based on gender identity in schools, government buildings, or both State laws don't allow transgender people to use bathrooms or other public facilities that match their gender identity in any government-owned place—this includes public schools, colleges, and all other public buildings ^{2} State laws block transgender people from using facilities that match their gender identity in K–12 schools and some government buildings, but not everywhere ^{2} State laws only restrict transgender people from using bathrooms that match their gender identity in K–12 schools ^{3} No state, district, or territory-wide laws that stop transgender people from using bathrooms or facilities that align with their gender identity ^{1} / ^{2} Notes:^{1} Montana's ban is currently blocked and unenforceable by court orders.^{2} In Florida, Montana, Ohio, and Wyoming, bans apply to some private facilities. Other states only apply them to government-run buildings.^{3} Virginia's restrictions come from state agency policy, not legislation, and affect schools as of June 4, 2024, in nine school districts.

Legal status of nondiscrimination protections based on gender identity and/or sex in public accommodations across U.S. states, the District of Columbia, and territories Bans discrimination in public accommodations based on both gender identity and gender or sex. Bans discrimination in public accommodations based only on sex, not gender identity. Limited federal protections apply in federally funded contexts (e.g., schools, shelters). Bans discrimination based only on sex.; explicitly excludes gender identity. Limited federal protections apply only in federally funded contexts. No public accommodations laws. Limited federal protections apply in federally funded contexts only.

Map of U.S. states, D.C., and territories by gender marker change policies on birth certificates Allows gender marker changes on birth certificates Does not allow gender marker changes on birth certificates

As of March 19, 2026, bathroom restrictions on transgender individuals are in effect in 22 U.S. states:

Table of state transgender bathroom restrictions in the U.S.
| Number | State | Effective date | Applies to | Maximum penalty | Exceptions |
|---|---|---|---|---|---|
| 2nd | Tennessee | July 1, 2021 | Public K–12 schools | Civil lawsuit allowed by students, parents, or employees | Single-occupancy facility may be requested as accommodation |
| 3rd | Alabama | April 8, 2022 | Public K–12 schools | No statutory penalty specified; institutions are expected to comply voluntarily | No exceptions specified |
| 4th | Oklahoma | May 25, 2022 | Charter schools; Public K–12 schools | 5% loss in state funding; Parents may sue | Single-occupancy facilities may be provided |
| 5th | Iowa | March 22, 2023 | Private K–12 schools; Public K–12 schools | Any citizen may file complaint with the Attorney General of Iowa | No exceptions specified |
| 6th | Kentucky | March 29, 2023 | Public K–12 schools | No statutory penalty specified; institutions are expected to comply voluntarily | No exceptions specified |
| 7th | Florida | July 1, 2023 | Public; K–12 schools; Colleges; College-run student housing; Correctional institutions; Domestic violence centers; Healthcare facilities; Homeless shelters; State government buildings with restrooms or changing facilities; Universities; Private (only if state-funded, state-licensed, or state-regulated); Colleges; College-run student housing; Correctional institutions; Universities; State-licensed; State colleges; Domestic violence centers; Healthcare facilities; Assisted living facilities; Massage establishments; Optical establishments; Shelters; Pain management clinics; Pharmacies; Substance abuse treatment facilities; State universities | Individuals who willfully enter a restroom or changing facility designated for the opposite sex and refuse to leave when asked commit trespass in a structure or conveyance, classified as a second-degree misdemeanor, punishable by up to 60 days in jail and a fine of up to $500; Covered entities that fail to comply with the law may face civil actions initiated by the Florida Attorney General, who can seek injunctive relief and impose fines of up to $10,000 per violation for willful non-compliance; Educational institutions, correctional facilities, detention centers, and public agencies must establish internal disciplinary procedures for staff, students, or inmates who violate the bill's provisions, with penalties that may include suspension, termination, or other appropriate disciplinary measures in accordance with institutional policies | Assisting someone due to age, disability, or medical need; Providing medical aid or emergency care; Responding to emergencies; Cleaning/maintenance when facility is unused; Opposite facility is empty and assigned one is out of order; Students and school staff excluded from criminal trespass; Juveniles and staff exempt in juvenile facilities; Public employees exempt in public buildings; Persons under medical treatment for intersex conditions (DSDs) |
| 8th | Arkansas | July 1, 2023 | Public K–12 schools | $1,000 minimum civil penalty per violation; Lawsuits allowed | Single-user accommodations may be offered |
| 10th | Virginia | July 18, 2023 (Model Policies on Ensuring Privacy, Dignity, and Respect for All Students and Parents in Virginia's Public Schools): August 30, 2022 (Hanover County Public Schools); August 14, 2023 (Spotsylvania County Public Schools); August 17, 2023 (Roanoke County Public Schools); September 12, 2023 (Pittsylvania County Public Schools); November 8, 2023 (Virginia Beach City Public Schools); November 10, 2023 (Newport News Public Schools); January 8, 2024 (Rockingham County Public Schools); February 12, 2024 (Chesapeake City Public Schools); June 4, 2024 (Lynchburg City Public Schools) | K–12 public schools: As of June 4, 2024, the following nine Virginia school districts have adopted bathroom restrictions in alignment with the model policy: Chesapeake City Public Schools; Hanover County Public Schools; Lynchburg City Public Schools; Newport News Public Schools; Pittsylvania County Public Schools; Roanoke County Public Schools; Rockingham County Public Schools; Spotsylvania County Public Schools; Virginia Beach City Public Schools | No statewide enforcement mechanism; state administrative guidance allows local school districts to adopt enforcement, though compliance is discretionary | No exceptions specified in state administrative guidance; local school districts may make exceptions under state guidance |
| 11th | North Dakota | August 1, 2023 | Public colleges; Public K–12 schools | No statutory penalty specified; institutions are expected to comply voluntarily | Single-user accommodation allowed with parental consent |
| 12th | Utah | May 1, 2024 | Government-owned facilities; Public colleges; Public schools | Class B misdemeanor (up to 6 months in jail and $1,000 fine); elevated to Class A misdemeanor (up to 1 year in jail and $2,500 fine) if trespass occurs in a dwelling; additional civil penalties may apply | Exception for post-op individuals with updated birth certificates |
| 13th | South Carolina | July 1, 2024 | Public K–12 schools | Loss of 25% of state operational funding for noncompliance; penalty enforced annually through budget provision | Single-user accommodation may be offered upon parental request |
| 14th | Mississippi | July 1, 2024 | Public colleges; Public schools | Civil lawsuits by individuals; Attorney General of Mississippi may also enforce | No exceptions specified |
| 15th | Louisiana | August 1, 2024 | Adult correctional facilities; Charter schools; Domestic violence shelters; Juvenile correctional facilities; Public K–12 schools | Civil lawsuits permitted by individuals alleging harm; Remedies include injunctions, protective orders, declaratory relief, actual damages, attorney fees, and costs | Assistance for young children; Assistance for individuals covered by the Americans with Disabilities Act; Custodial services; Maintenance services; Medical services; Law enforcement services; Emergencies; Single-occupancy restrooms, changing rooms, and sleeping quarters not designated by sex are allowed |
| 3rd (overall) 6th (public colleges only) | Alabama | October 1, 2024 | Public colleges | No statutory penalty specified; institutions are expected to comply voluntarily | No exceptions specified |
| 16th (overall) 7th (public colleges only) | Ohio | February 25, 2025 | Private colleges; Private schools; Public colleges; Public school; Residential educational programs allowing minors, including overnight stays | No statutory penalty specified; institutions are expected to comply voluntarily | Children under 10; People with disabilities; Staff on duty |
| 9th | Idaho | July 1, 2023 October 12, 2023 March 20, 2025 | Public K–12 schools | Civil action: $5,000 per incident, plus additional damages | Reasonable accommodations (e.g., single-occupancy facilities) |
| 18th (overall) 9th (public colleges only) | West Virginia | June 9, 2025 | Correctional institutions; Licensed domestic violence shelters receiving funding from the West Virginia Department of Human Services; Public K–12 schools; State institutions of higher education | No statutory penalty specified; institutions are expected to comply voluntarily | No exceptions specified |
| 2nd (overall) 3rd (residential educational programs allowing minors, including overnight stays only) | Tennessee | July 1, 2025 | Residential educational programs allowing minors, including overnight stays | Civil lawsuit allowed by students, parents, or employees | Single-occupancy facility may be requested as accommodation |
| 19th (overall) 10th (public colleges only) | South Dakota | July 1, 2025 | Public K–12 schools; State-owned buildings; State-owned facilities | Declaratory and injunctive relief may be sought if schools or state agencies fail to take reasonable steps to prevent access by someone of the opposite sex | No exceptions specified |
| 20th (overall) 11th (public colleges only) | Wyoming | July 1, 2025 | Government-owned buildings; Government-owned colleges; Government-owned spaces; Public K–12 schools | Parents or guardians may sue for violations in K–12 settings only; No statutory penalty specified for government-owned buildings, colleges, and spaces; institutions are expected to comply voluntarily | City jails; County jails |
| 9th (overall) 12th (public colleges only) | Idaho | July 1, 2025 | Correctional facilities; Domestic violence shelters; Juvenile correctional centers; State educational institutions | Civil action for declaratory; Injunctive relief if violations occur | Custodial services; Medical assistance; Law enforcement; Emergency services; Maintenance; Situations involving custodial care; Situations involving family members; Situations involving legal guardians; Situations involving assistance for individuals with disabilities |
| 8th (overall) 13th (public colleges only) | Arkansas | August 8, 2025 | Government-run shelters; Juvenile detention facilities; Other government-owned public buildings; State correctional facilities | Civil liability: private right of action for damages; Declaratory and injunctive relief | Aid to disabled; Aid to elderly; Aid to young children; Coach/athletic personnel; Custodial work; Emergency situations; Law enforcement duties; Medical aid |
| 21st (overall) 14th (public colleges only) | Texas | 91st day after adjournment sine die of the 89th Legislature, 2nd Called Session (likely December 13, 2025 if the session ends September 13, 2025) | Government-owned/controlled multiple-occupancy private spaces (restrooms, locker rooms, changing rooms, showers) in state agencies and political subdivisions (incl. public colleges/universities and school districts); Correctional facilities (housing by sex); Family violence shelters (female-only services if designated for female victims) | Civil penalty on state agencies/political subdivisions: $25,000 (first) / $125,000 (subsequent), each day a separate violation; Private civil right of action (declaratory/injunctive relief, fees); Attorney General enforcement incl. mandamus; fee-shifting for suits seeking to enjoin enforcement (Civil Practice & Remedies Code § 30.024) | Custodial, maintenance/inspection, medical or other emergency aid; Assisting a person who needs help; law enforcement; safety/order threats; Children ≤9 with caregiver; May provide single-occupancy accommodations; policies for disability/elderly/young child assistance |

Table of repealed or blocked state transgender bathroom restrictions in the U.S.
| Number | State | Effective date | Date blocked | Repeal date | Applies to | Maximum penalty | Exceptions |
|---|---|---|---|---|---|---|---|
| 1st | North Carolina | March 23, 2016 | N/A | March 30, 2017 | Public schools; Government buildings | No statutory penalty specified; institutions are expected to comply voluntarily | Accompanying individuals needing assistance; Children under seven with a caretaker; Custodial; Maintenance; Medical assistance; Transgender individuals who updated their birth certificates following sex reassignment surgery |
| 17th (overall) 8th (public colleges only) | Montana | March 27, 2025 | April 2, 2025 | N/A | Public buildings; Restrooms in facilities funded by the state; Locker rooms in facilities funded by the state; Sleeping areas in facilities funded by the state | No statutory penalty specified; institutions are expected to comply voluntarily | No exceptions specified |

The National Center for Transgender Equality, an LGBTQ advocacy group now part of Advocates for Trans Equality, calls these bills discriminatory.

=== Jurisdiction ===
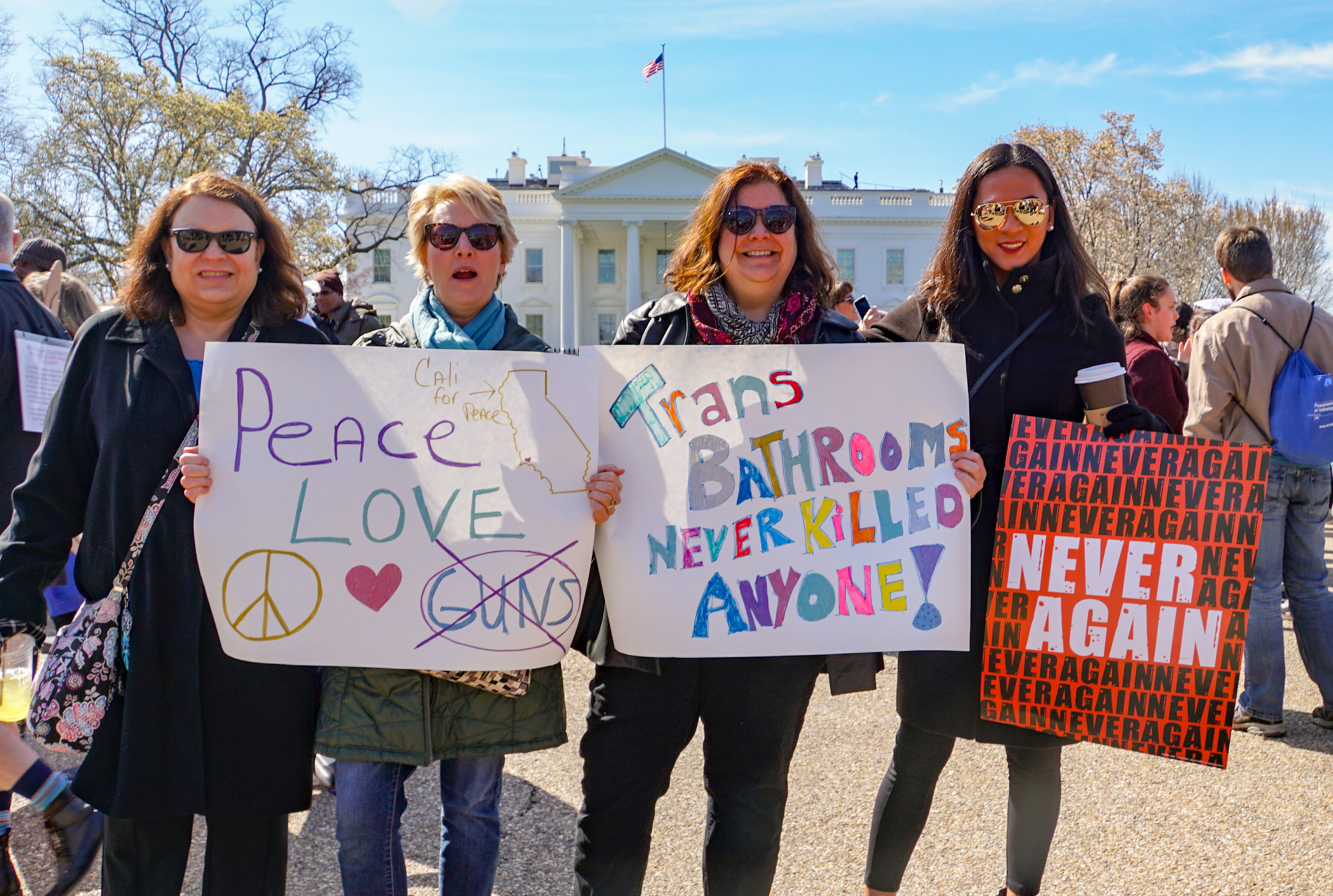
"Trans bathrooms never killed anyone!" sign at the 2018 March for Our Lives

Federal, state and local laws govern toilets and other intimate spaces.

- To pass federal (national) laws, the government has to cite a national interest (e.g., the law would affect federal property or a federal interest in state property).
- Each U.S. state is a sovereign entity that makes its own laws, which are secondary to federal law under the constitutional doctrine of federalism.
- Each state may delegate powers to its local governments.

Federal or state agencies may issue regulations to clarify laws but not to alter or contradict them.

While some universities and large cities have built unisex toilets (aka all-gender bathrooms), most offer sex-separated spaces too. Building laws in some states require public toilets to be separated by sex.

On August 28, 2025, the U.S. Education Department cited the federal law of Title IX to complain about Denver Public Schools' all-gender bathrooms and its policy allowing students to use gender-specific bathrooms corresponding to their gender identity.

=== Examples ===
In a landmark 2013 case, the Colorado Civil Rights Division ruled in favor of six-year-old transgender student Coy Mathis to use the girls' bathroom at her elementary school. It was the first ruling of its kind in the United States and one of the first high-profile transgender rights cases, garnering huge amounts of media attention.

In May 2016, the United States Department of Justice and the United States Department of Education released a joint guidance on the application of Title IX protections to transgender students. The guidance stated that for the purpose of Title IX, the Department of Justice and the Department of Education treat a student's gender identity as their sex. The guidance was followed by a formal "Dear Colleague" letter on May 13.

In October 2016, the U.S. Supreme Court agreed to take up the case of Gavin Grimm, a transgender male student who was barred from using the boys' bathrooms at his high school in Gloucester County, Virginia. The U.S. Court of Appeals for the 4th Circuit had previously ruled that Grimm could use these restrooms, but the Supreme Court stayed that decision in August.

In February 2016, the city of Charlotte, North Carolina, adopted an ordinance which, it said, was intended to allow transgender persons a right to access bathrooms according to gender identity. The preexisting ordinance, in § 12-58 prohibited discrimination race, religion or national origin. In addition, the preexisting ordinance in § 12-59 banned discrimination based on sex but specifically exempted bathrooms, changing rooms and other intimate spaces from sex discrimination prohibitions, thus allowing separation based on sex. The ordinance did not ban discrimination based on gender identity or sexual orientation. By the February 2016 amendment, the City Council added gender, gender identity, sexual orientation and marital status to the protected categories. It also deleted this provision that allowed separation based on "sex". In so doing, it essentially eliminated the word "sex" from the city ordinance, leaving the term gender. The North Carolina legislature reacted by passing the Public Facilities Privacy & Security Act (HB2). In addition to making other changes, the bill defined the issue of bathroom access as one of statewide concern, defined sex as biological. It required that all bathrooms be separated by biological sex. It did allow for business owners to apply for a waiver to make single-entry bathrooms all-gender/mixed-sex. Afterward, advocacy groups, celebrities, and businesses joined in a boycott of the state. Later, in a "compromise", the legislature agreed to repeal HB2, but it also barred localities from making any changes regarding bathrooms until 2020.

Shortly after HB2 was passed, in May 2016, in the last year of President Obama's presidency, the U.S. Justice Department sued North Carolina over its 'bathroom bill' in order to stop its implementation. Moreover, advocates, including LGBTQ rights organizations, have reported instances of businesses in North Carolina enforcing toilet restrictions on transgender customers.

In 2016, Mississippi also limited public toilet usage through the enactment of a law that protects religious beliefs, citing: "male (man) or female (woman) refers to an individual's immutable biological sex as objectively determined by anatomy and genetics at time of birth", which does not consider transgender and intersex people. Later, the Justice Department under Trump withdrew its opposition to this and similar state laws and policies. In 2024, Mississippi passed a bathroom ban that affects public schools.

As of 10 May 2024, according to the American Civil Liberties Union, 515 anti-LGBTQ bills had been introduced throughout the US during the 2024 legislative session, most targeting transgender people. Bills currently being considered include Kansas SB 180.

In November 2024, Representative Nancy Mace introduced a resolution to ban transgender people from using bathrooms other than those of their sex assigned at birth at the U.S. Capitol, in anticipation of the swearing in of U.S. House member-elect Sarah McBride from Delaware, who is the first openly trans woman elected to Congress. Speaker of the House Mike Johnson then issued a ruling requiring transgender people to use the bathroom corresponding to their sex assigned at birth within the House of Representatives.

On March 19, 2025, Marcy Rheintgen was arrested in the Florida State Capitol when she attempted to use the women's restroom in the building. She is being charged with possible jail time under a second-degree misdemeanor. In June 2025, charges were dropped and the case was dismissed as prosecutors failed to meet the deadline for filing charging documents.

=== Public perception ===
Public opinion regarding bathroom access rights for transgender individuals in the United States is divided:

| Date(s) conducted | Support laws that require transgender individuals to use bathrooms that correspond to their birth sex | Oppose laws that require transgender individuals to use bathrooms that correspond to their birth sex | Don't know / NA | Margin of error | Sample | Conducted by | Polling type |
|---|---|---|---|---|---|---|---|
| August 25, 2023 – August 30, 2023 | 54% | 40% | 5% | 2.19% | Representative sample of 2525 American adults | Public Religion Research Institute | Online interview |
| February 17, 2023 – March 3, 2023 | 45% | 40% | 16% | ? | "Approximately a thousand" adults under 75 | Ipsos | Online Survey |
| September 1, 2022 – September 11, 2022 | 52% | 44% | 4% | 2.3% | Representative sample of 2523 American adults | Public Religion Research Institute | Online interview |
| August 9, 2021 – August 30, 2021 | 47% | 50% | 2% | 1.86% | Representative sample of 5,415 adults | Public Religion Research Institute | Online interview |
| June 10, 2019 | 45% | 47% | | ± 3.5 percentage points | 1,100 American adults | Pew Research | Cellphone and landline phones |
| April 9, 2019 – April 20, 2019 | 45% | 47% | 8% | 3.5% | Random Sample of 1,100 adults | Public Religion Research Institute | Online interview |
| August 2, 2017 – August 8, 2017 | 38% | 50% | 12% | ? | 2,024 | Public Religion Research Institute | Landline and Cell phone |
| May 3, 2017 – May 7, 2017 | 48% | 45% | 7% | 4% | 1,011 adults American adults | Gallup | Cellphone and landline phones |
| March 2017 | 40% | 40% | | ? | ? | YouGov | ? |
| February 10, 2017 – February 19, 2017 | 39% | 53% | 8% | 2.6% | 2,031 adults | Public Religion Research Institute | Live interviews via RDD telephones and cell phones |
| August 16, 2016 – September 12, 2016, 2016 | 46% | 51% | 3% | 2.4% | 4,538 respondents | Pew Research | Web and mail |
| May 4, 2016 – May 8, 2016 | 50% | 40% | 10% | ? | ? | Gallup | ? |
| April 28, 2016 – May 1, 2016 | 38% | 57% | 5% | 3% | 1,001 adults | CNN / ORC International | Live interviews via landline telephones and cell phones |
| March 26, 2016 – March 28, 2016 | 37% | 37% | 26% | 4% | 1,000 adult American citizens | YouGov | Online interviews |
| June 3, 2015 – June 4, 2015 | 46% | 41% | 12% | 4.1% | 1,300 unweighted respondents | CBS / NYT | ? |

=== Reception ===
Proponents of bathroom bills argue that such legislation is necessary to maintain privacy, protect what they claim to be an innate sense of modesty held by most cisgender people, prevent voyeurism, assault, molestation, and rape, and retain psychological comfort.

Critics of bathroom bills have argued that they place transgender people in danger without making cisgender people any safer and that they even make things more dangerous for gender non-conforming cisgender people. Many national health and anti-sexual assault organizations oppose bathroom bills, such as the American Medical Association, American Psychological Association, and the American Academy of Pediatrics. The UCLA's Williams Institute has tracked prevalence of crimes in bathrooms since the passage of various protections for the transgender population and has found that there has been no significant change in the number of crimes. Marcie Bianco, writing for Mic in 2015, pointed out that there is not a single documented case of a transgender person attacking a cisgender person in a public restroom, although there has been one reported incident of voyeurism in a fitting room. Pacific Standard described the controversy as a moral panic and writer Dan Savage characterized it as an "anti-trans blood libel".

According to the largest U.S. survey of transgender people ever undertaken, carried out by the National Center for Transgender Equality (NCTE) in 2015 with 27,715 respondents, 1% of respondents reported being sexually assaulted in a public restroom for being transgender. 12% reported being verbally harassed in a public restroom, and another one percent reported being non-sexually physically assaulted for being transgender. 9% reported being denied the right to use a public restroom consistent with their expressed gender. The NCTE acknowledges in its report that this survey was undertaken before any bathroom bills had been passed or were in the news. Studies, including those cited by health organizations, have found that denying transgender individuals access to bathrooms aligned with their gender identity is associated with adverse mental health outcomes, including increased risk of suicide.

A 2018 study in the Journal of the American Academy of Psychiatry and the Law finds that "there is no current evidence that granting transgender individuals access to gender-corresponding restrooms results in an increase in sexual offenses".

=== Education ===
In 2016, the U.S. Department of Justice and U.S. Department of Education, under President Barack Obama issued "guidance" to state and private educational institutions stating that these institutions had to allow transgender students to use toilets according to their gender identity. The Obama guidance suggested that schools and private institutions risked federal funding if they did not comply.

How the guidance was issued was controversial. Guidance procedures are normally issued only to other federal agencies. These guidances are then sometimes shared with state entities and private institutions as advisory, but they are normally not compulsive. While agencies can issue regulations that are consistent with existing law, they cannot exceed or change the law. Moreover, those regulations must comply with the U.S. Administrative Procedure Act (APA). The APA requires notice to the public and a period for comments. Opponents argued that using the joint guidance was inappropriate and was designed to circumvent the APA. The Department of Justice, the Department of Education, advocacy groups and private litigants brought cases to enforce the joint guidance interpretation.

One of those cases, G.G. v. Gloucester School Board, reached the Supreme Court in 2016. On February 22, 2017, about a month after Trump's inauguration, the government withdrew the May 13 guidance. In withdrawing the guidance, then Attorney General Jeff Sessions stated in a letter, "The prior guidance documents did not contain sufficient legal analysis or explain how the interpretation was consistent with the language of Title IX. ... Congress, state legislatures, and local governments are in a position to adopt appropriate policies or laws addressing this issue." On March 6, 2017, the Supreme Court determined that, in light of the changed position of the government, the case, should be vacated and the case remanded for further consideration in the lower courts.

=== Employment ===
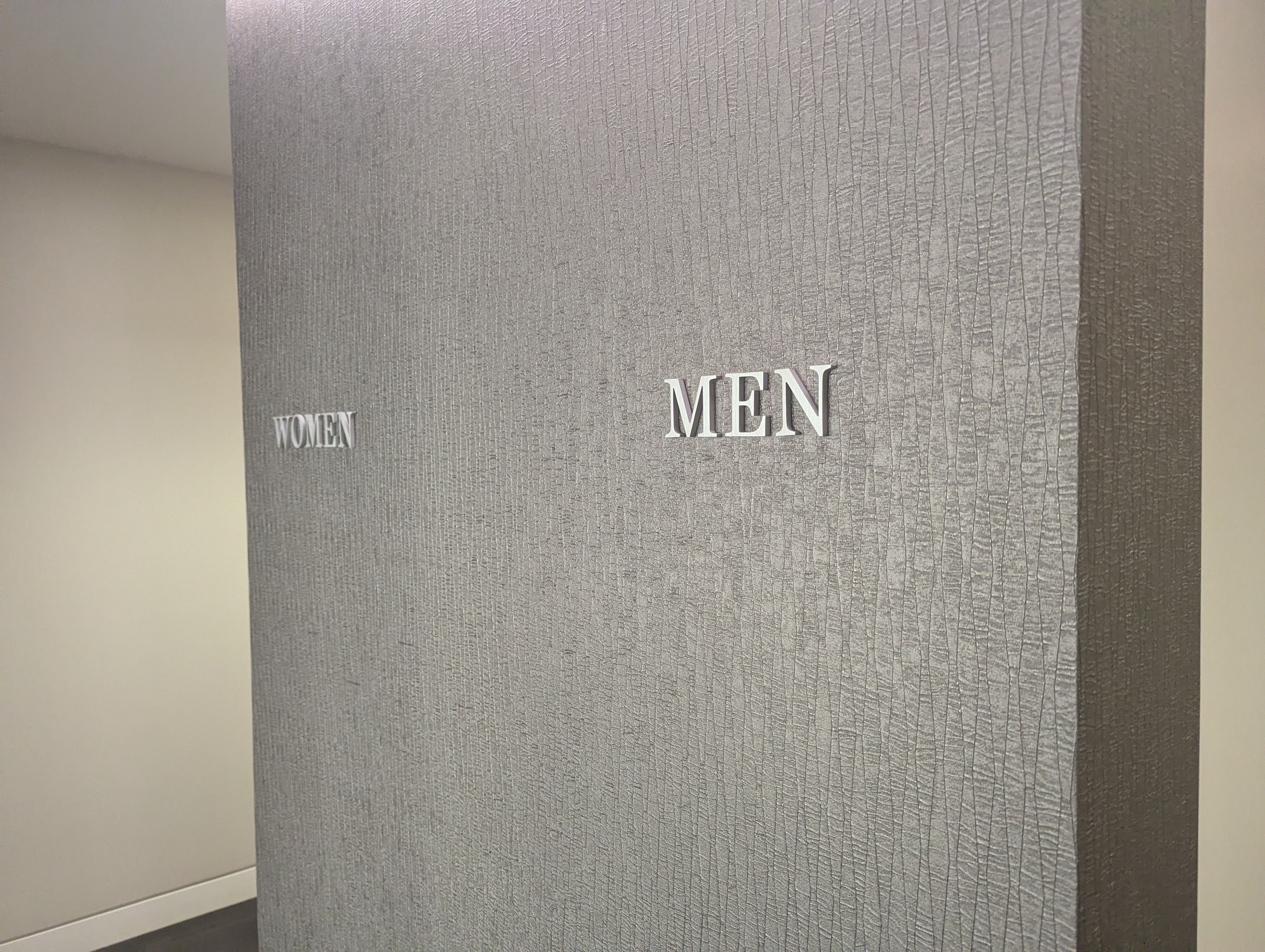
Bathroom signs for men and women at the Heritage Foundation

The Equal Employment Opportunity Commission (EEOC) is a key U.S. agency that enforces federal workplace rules. States also have their own rules but in a conflict, if constitutional, federal law is supreme. A key statute is Title VII. Title VII, passed as part of the Civil Rights Act of 1964, prohibits discrimination in the workplace "because of" race, color, religion, sex, or national origin. Title VII does not mention sexual orientation or gender identity.

Although few contend that Congress was thinking about gender identity or sexual orientation in 1964, advocates have argued that sexual orientation and gender identity are included in the law's reference to "sex". In 2012, the EEOC adopted this view. It ruled in Macy v. Holder, a case involving federal employees, that Title VII required that "gender identity" be treated the same as "sex". It also ruled soon thereafter that a transgender person had to be afforded access to a public toilet matching the person's gender identity without a requirement of surgery or status identification. These decisions departed from then existing legal precedent as well as the EEOC's own long line of precedents. The EEOC began to bring and support lawsuits across the country to enforce its interpretation. Citing the EEOC's holding, several courts later followed the EEOC's interpretation, although some rejected it.

On June 15, 2020, the U.S. Supreme Court decided three cases about the rights of transgender people under the Title VII of the Civil Rights Act of 1964:

- R.G. & G.R. Harris Funeral Homes Inc. v. Equal Employment Opportunity Commission. The case involved a transgender woman who was fired from her job at a funeral home after she asked to begin wearing the uniform for women rather than men. The funeral home's owner refused, citing the religious concerns of the employer and potential clients. The court ruled that transgender people are protected from employment discrimination. Regarding whether the decision affected the very existence of "sex-segregated bathrooms, locker rooms, and dress codes", Justice Gorsuch wrote: "none of these other laws are before us...we do not prejudge any such question today."
- Bostock v. Clayton County
- Altitude Express, Inc. v Zarda

One has seen reversals of Obama-era policies at the federal level with respect to other statutes such as Title IX which prohibits denials of educational opportunity based on sex. In May 2016 the U.S. Department of Education and the Justice Department under the Obama Administration indicated that single-sex schools and schools receiving federal money must treat transgender students consistent with their gender identity under Title IX of the Education Amendments of 1972. That guidance was later withdrawn by the Department of Justice under President Trump.

Currently in the U.S., each state, county, and city government enacts its own legislation governing how it will or will not address the rights of LGBT individuals; this includes provision of public toilets.

=== State legislation ===
Bathroom bills have been proposed and debated in a number of state legislatures. Several state bills are based on and closely resemble model legislation provided by the conservative lobbying organization Alliance Defending Freedom (ADF), which has been classified by the Southern Poverty Law Center as an anti-LGBT hate group. The ADF's model legislation proposes giving any public school or university student the right to sue for $2,500 for each time they encountered a transgender classmate in a locker room or bathroom.

==== Table ====
The following table summarizes state legislation and school guidelines regarding restroom access that either is currently in effect, or is still under deliberation with movement within the last year;

| State | Applies to | Summary | Status | Last checked |
|---|---|---|---|---|
| AR | Adults | Act 619 criminalizes those who knowingly stay inside restrooms with a child of the opposite biological sex | In effect as of April 11, 2023 | March 11, 2024 |
| AR | Students | HB 1156 allows students to sue the school if they encounter a member of the opposite biological sex in a single-sex restroom | Passed on March 13, 2023, awaiting to be signed into law | March 13, 2023 |
| AK | Students | HB 105 separates students by biological sex in restrooms and locker rooms | Referred to committee on March 8, 2023 | March 13, 2023 |
| AL | Students | HB 322 requires public K-12 schools to designate use of rooms where students may be in various stages of undress on the basis of biological sex | Passed on April 7, 2022 | |
| CT | Adults | SB 00467 permits businesses to ban trans people from bathrooms | Introduced January 18, 2023, referred to committee | March 17, 2023 |
| FL | Adults | HB 1521, "Provides that any person who willfully enters a restroom or changing facility designated for the opposite sex on the premises of a covered entity, for a purpose other than the authorized uses listed in the bill, who refuses to depart when asked to do so by a person authorized to make such a request, commits the criminal offense of trespass." | In effect as of July 1, 2023 | July 8, 2023 |
| ID | Adults | ID S1003 and S1016 relieve public works contractors from the obligation of providing restrooms under any basis other than "biological sex" | S1016 passed house on March 3, 2023 | March 17, 2023 |
| ID | Students | ID S1100 separates school bathrooms by biological sex | Passed on March 16, 2023 | March 17, 2023 |
| IL | Students | IL SB1659 separates school bathrooms by biological sex | Referred to committee on February 8, 2023 | March 17, 2023 |
| IN | Adults | HB 1520, "Makes it a Class B misdemeanor if: (1) a male knowingly or intentionally enters a restroom that is designated to be used only by females; or (2) a female knowingly or intentionally enters a restroom that is designated to be used only by males." A reintroduction of HB 1348 from previous year. | Referred to committee January 19, 2023 | March 13, 2023 |
| KS | Students | SB 180 Defines "male" and "female" by reproductive system, and says that "sex" in state law refers to one's "sex, either male or female, at birth". School restrooms will be divided by sex. | To take effect July 1, 2024 | June 4, 2024 |
| KS | Adults | SB 180 Also applies to locker rooms, prisons, shelters and crisis centers. | To take effect July 1, 2024 | June 4, 2024 |
| LA | Adults | HB 608 Applies to public schools, domestic violence shelters, and correctional and juvenile detention centers. | To take effect August 1, 2024 | June 27, 2024 |
| ND | Students and adults | HB 1473 separates restrooms and shower rooms by biological sex for certain public correctional facilities and colleges | To be deliberated in the House on March 15, 2023 | March 13, 2023 |
| NH | Students | HB 104 defines all multi-stall school restrooms as "single sex". | Under deliberation in the House | March 13, 2023 |
| NH | Students | HB 619 requires students to use only the restrooms that correspond to their birth certificate. | Under deliberation in the House | March 13, 2023 |
| OK | Students | SB 615 requires students to use restrooms and locker rooms that match the sex listed on their birth certificates. Requires schools to provide a single-occupancy changing room as a reasonable accommodation for students who do not wish to comply. | In effect as of May 25, 2022 | |
| TN | Adults | HB 1151 modified the definition of "public spaces" in Tennessee indecent exposure laws to include multi-user restrooms, locker rooms, or dressing rooms. Existing interpretations of TN law could construe a trans person using such facilities as indecent exposure if another person finds their presence objectionable. | In effect as of July 1, 2019 | |
| UT | Students | Affects public schools. | Signed by governor on January 30, 2024 | June 4, 2024 |
| UT | Adults | Affects government buildings. If someone is challenged on their sex, they must show their birth certificate and proof of gender-affirming surgery. | Signed by governor on January 30, 2024 | June 4, 2024 |
| VA | Students | September 2022 model policies for VA public schools require students to use " bathrooms, locker rooms, and other facilities that correspond with their biological sex." | Model policies issued to VA schools on September 21, 2022 | |

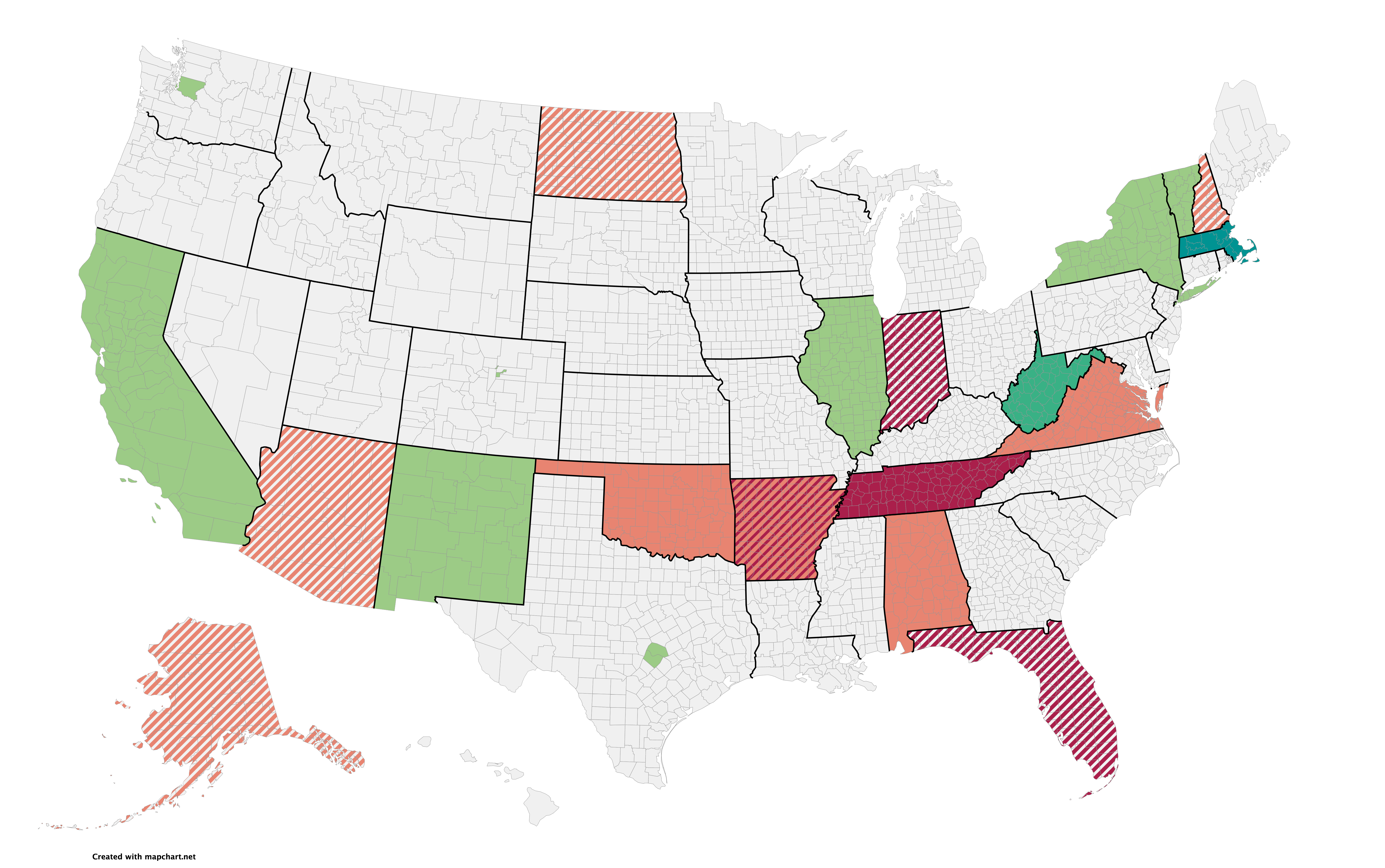
Map of states and counties in the United States which have enacted legislation on restrooms, locker rooms, and other sex-segregated public accommodations, in regard to their access from those who are transgender, or have gender dysphoria: State, city, or county mandates single-user unisex restrooms in all public buildings State explicitly prohibits discrimination in restrooms on the basis of gender identity State legislation or school guidelines currently allow students to use restrooms that correspond with gender identity State legislation or school guidelines currently prohibit students from using restrooms that differ from biological sex Currently considering state legislation or school guidelines that would prohibit students from using restrooms that differ from biological sex State indecent exposure law may be construed to criminalize trans people from undressing in locker rooms or using restrooms that do not match their biological sex Currently considering bills that may criminalize trans people from undressing in locker rooms or using restrooms that do not match their biological sex

==== Alabama ====
SB1, also known as the "Alabama Privacy Act", was introduced in Alabama on February 7, 2017, by state Senator Phil Williams in response to an inclusive bathroom policy enacted by Target Corporation in 2016. The bill, if passed, would require attendants to be present in mixed-gender public bathrooms "to monitor the appropriate use of the rest room and answer any questions or concerns posed by users." The bill stalled and was never brought to a vote.

HB 322 was introduced on February 9, 2022. The bill's primary sponsor was Scott Stadthagen and "requires public K-12 schools to designate use of rooms where students may be in various stages of undress on the basis of biological sex". The bill passed on April 7, 2022, and was signed into law by Alabama Governor Kay Ivey on April 8, 2022.

==== Alaska ====
Anchorage, Alaska, prohibited discrimination based on gender identity in 2015. In 2017, Alaska Family Action proposed a direct initiative bathroom bill that would have overturned protections for transgender individuals. Proposition 1 would have made it legal for "any employer, public accommodation, or other person to establish and enforce sex-specific standards or policies concerning access to intimate facilities such as locker rooms, showers, changing rooms, and restrooms." The measure defines the term sex as "An individual's immutable biological condition of being male or female, as objectively determined by anatomy and genetics at the time of birth." Voters rejected the bill in April 2018.

==== Arizona ====
A 2013 proposed amendment to Arizona bill S.B. 1432 would have allowed police to demand identification from anyone suspected of using the 'wrong' public bathrooms or showers, meaning the facilities assigned to the sex not matching the sex on their birth certificate. If found guilty, a person would have been subject to up to six months in jail and a $2500 fine under a disorderly conduct charge. The proposal was withdrawn by its sponsor, John Kavanagh.

Kavanagh introduced S.B. 1040 on January 31, 2023, which requires public schools to provide separate accommodations to a person who is "unwilling or unable" to use a bathroom which matches their "immutable biological sex as determined by anatomy and genetics at the time of the person's birth." Additionally, a student who encounters a person of the opposite sex in a restroom may have a cause of action against the school and may sue to "recover monetary damages for all psychological, emotional and physical harm suffered." Governor Katie Hobbs vetoed the bill on June 8, 2023.

==== Arkansas ====
HB1156 was introduced by Rep. Mary Bentley on January 17, 2023. It requires public schools to provide reasonable accommodation for an individual who is "unwilling or unable" to use a bathroom designated for the individual's sex, where sex is defined as "the physical condition of being male or female based on genetics and physiology". A public school may be sued if a student encounters a member of the opposite sex in the bathroom who received permission to be there from the school, and fines may be assessed for superintendents, principals, and/or individual teachers by the Professional Licensure Standards Board. The House approved the bill on an 80–10 vote on February 1, 2023.

SB270 was introduced by lead sponsor John Payton and primary sponsor Cindy Crawford on February 15, 2023, to amend the criminal offense of sexual indecency with a child to include a person "exposing his or her sex organs to a minor of the opposite sex" in a bathroom, or entering a bathroom "that is assigned to persons of the opposite sex while knowing a minor of the opposite sex is present". The penalty for violating this law includes up to a year in jail and up to a $2,500 fine.

After being pulled back to committee on March 2, 2023 as the result of a speech by Sen. Clarke Tucker, the bill was revised, resubmitted, and passed the senate on March 7, waiting for house deliberation on March 9.

==== California ====
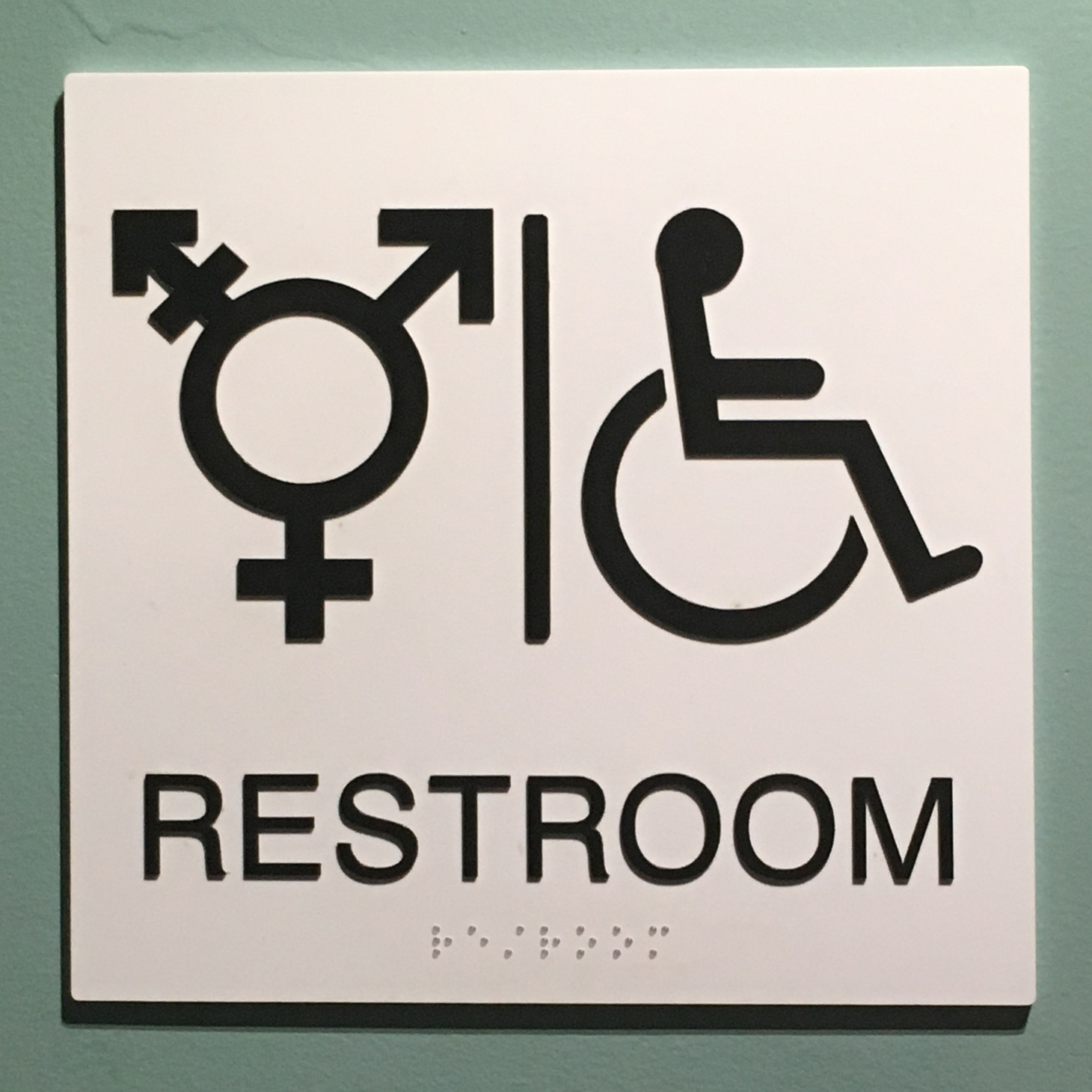
Gender neutral and handicap-accessible restroom sign in California

AB 1266, also known as the "School Success and Opportunity Act", was introduced by Assemblyman Tom Ammiano on February 22, 2013. It requires that pupils be permitted to participate in sex-segregated school programs, activities, and use facilities consistent with their gender identity, without respect to the gender listed in a pupil's records. AB 1266 was approved by Governor Brown on August 12, 2013. A campaign to overturn AB1266 led by Frank Schubert failed to garner enough signatures to appear on a ballot the following year.

On Sept 19, 2014 Governor Brown vetoed 2 potty parity bills, SB1350 and SB1358 introduced by senators Ricardo Lara and Lois Wolk. These bills would have required changing stations in public bathrooms to be accessible to both men and women. Brown cited too many regulations as a rationale for his vetos.

AB 1732, also known as the "Equal Restroom Access Act", was authored by Assembly Member Phil Ting and signed into law by Governor Jerry Brown on September 29, 2016, after approval by the Assembly and Senate. The law made California the first state in the US to require all single-occupancy public toilets to be gender-neutral beginning March 1, 2017. This includes California schools, government buildings, businesses and public toilets. Legislation has also been proposed in California that "requires...private buildings open to the public, as specified, to maintain at least one safe, sanitary, and convenient baby diaper changing station that is accessible to women and men". Since California passed AB 1732, states like New York, Vermont, New Mexico, the District of Columbia and several other jurisdictions have followed suit.

SB 760 was introduced by State Sen. Josh Newman on February 17, 2023. The law requires all K-12 schools to provide access to gender-neutral bathrooms during school hours.

==== Colorado ====
In Colorado, in February 2015, a bill died in committee that proposed banning transgender people from using changing rooms of their gender identity. This bill would have prevented discrimination lawsuits against facility managers who chose to deny entry into facilities to transgender people.

==== Florida ====
A bathroom bill was introduced in Florida in the spring of 2015 as H.B. 583 by Representative Frank Artiles. Artiles complained that, under laws protecting transgender use of restrooms, "A man such as myself can walk into the bathroom at LA Fitness while women are taking showers, changing, and simply walk in there." His bill would have made it illegal for transgender people to use bathrooms corresponding to their gender identity in restaurants, workplaces, or schools. The consequences would be up to a year in jail and a $1,000 fine. Proponents claimed that the bill was designed to prevent "assault, battery, molestation, rape, voyeurism, and exhibitionism". Opponents claimed that the only purpose was to be "discriminatory" and to "criminalize [transgender people] for simply going about their daily lives". The bill went through two House committees, but did not pass. There were no further bathroom bills filed in the Florida state legislature in 2015 or 2016, but organizations like Equality Florida said in 2017 that they were preparing for the possibility of future bills.

==== Idaho ====
In March 2026, Idaho lawmakers approved legislation that would make it a misdemeanor offense for individuals to use bathrooms or changing rooms that do not correspond to their sex assigned at birth in places of public accommodation, including private businesses or facilities that serve the public.

==== Indiana ====
In January 2021, Indiana State Senator Bruce Borders introduced a Bill to the Senate that would make it a Class-B Misdemeanor for any person to use a bathroom or locker-room that did not correlate with their birth sex.

==== Kansas ====
In 2016, the Kansas legislature introduced a "bathroom bill" that was nearly identical to the ADF's model "bathroom bill" legislation. The bill died after public protests over the legislation's provision allowing students to sue their school if they encountered a transgender person in a bathroom or locker room.

A 2023 Kansas law shields government agencies and schools from lawsuits if they prohibit transgender women from using women's bathrooms, but does not mandate restrictions.

In January 2026, the Kansas state legislature passed a bill requiring restrooms in government buildings to be restricted to those of the corresponding assigned sex. Governor Laura Kelly vetoed the bill the following month. However, just 3 days after the veto, a House Motion to override veto prevailed, leading to the passing of Kansas Senate Bill 244. The House vote was 87 yeas and 37 nays. All Republican representatives voted yea, and all Democratic reps - save for Valdenia Winn, who was not present - voted nay. The bill states that it would require "the designation of multiple-occupancy private spaces in public buildings for use by only one sex and imposing criminal and civil penalties for violations, defining the term 'gender' to mean biological sex at birth for purposes of statutory construction...". The bill would also apply to 'multiple-occupancy private spaces,' which includes spaces like restrooms, hospital rooms, dorm rooms, domestic violence shelters, and more. With the passing of the bill, individuals who violated it may be charged with misdemeanor with jail time and/or fine. Those who violate the law would receive no penalty on first violation, but a penalty of $1,000 for a second violation. They could be charged with a misdemeanor crime on a third violation. Potentially large penalties for public agencies that don’t comply with the law are also set. Such penalties may include fines of $25,000 for a first violation and $125,000 for a second violation.

==== Kentucky ====
A 2015 proposal in Kentucky, also based on the ADF model legislation, would have allowed students to sue their school if they encountered transgender students using the bathroom corresponding to the gender with which they identify. It would have allowed transgender students instead to request special accommodations, including access to single-stall or faculty restrooms. On February 27, 2015, the bill S.B. 76 passed in the Kentucky Senate, but it did not pass the Kentucky House.

==== Louisiana ====
The "Women's Protection Act," House Bill 608 codified the definition of "man" and "woman" and restricts the use of restrooms in public schools, domestic violence shelters, and correctional and juvenile detention centers to only those whose sex matches what was assigned at birth.

==== Massachusetts ====
In 2016, Massachusetts prohibited discrimination based on gender identity in sex-segregated facilities. The law was called "An Act Relative to Transgender Anti-Discrimination."

To address criticism that a man could insincerely claim to be a transgender woman to gain access to a bathroom for the purpose of looking at women inside, the law included a provision prohibiting assertion of a gender identity for an "improper purpose". (In addition to being charged for merely being present, he could be charged for the separate crimes of assault, harassment or "peeping Tom" offenses.

A study of Massachusetts cities that enacted a similar ban in the two years before the 2016 statewide nondiscrimination law took effect found it had no impact on the rate of bathroom crimes, which were rare to begin with.

In the November 6, 2018 election, voters were asked whether to repeal this law. The Massachusetts Gender Identity Anti-Discrimination Initiative appeared on the ballot as "Question 3". This was the first time such a question was put to voters at the state level. The existing nondiscrimination law was upheld by approximately 1.76 million votes for and 834,000 votes against.

==== Minnesota ====
A bathroom bill was introduced in Minnesota in 2016. It was a word-for-word copy of the ADF's model legislation.

==== Mississippi ====
House Bill 1258 was introduced in 2016, but did not make any progress. It would have charged any person who "lewdly and willfully exposed his person, or private parts thereof" with a misdemeanor. Notably, an exception was explicitly made for transgender people who had taken HRT for a period of at least 12 months, requiring such persons to be able to provide written proof from a doctor.

==== Missouri ====
Two bathroom bills were introduced in Missouri in 2017.

==== Nevada ====
On March 19, 2015, Victoria Dooling, a Nevada state representative, proposed a bathroom bill that would apply to public schoolchildren in the state. It later died in committee.

==== New Mexico ====
In March 2019, a bill passed both houses of the New Mexico Legislature (House vote 54-12 and Senate vote 23–15) to explicitly allow gender-neutral bathrooms. The bill was signed into law by the Governor within the same month and went into effect on July 1, 2019.

==== New York ====
On March 7, 2016, Mayor Bill de Blasio signed an Executive Order requiring that all New York City municipalities make available to the public and their employees a single-sex facility consistent with their gender identities. Individuals using these facilities would not need to show any identification or medical documentation to verify their gender.

The New York State Legislature, in July 2020, passed a bill to implement gender-neutral bathrooms within all single occupancy public toilets across the state.

==== North Carolina ====
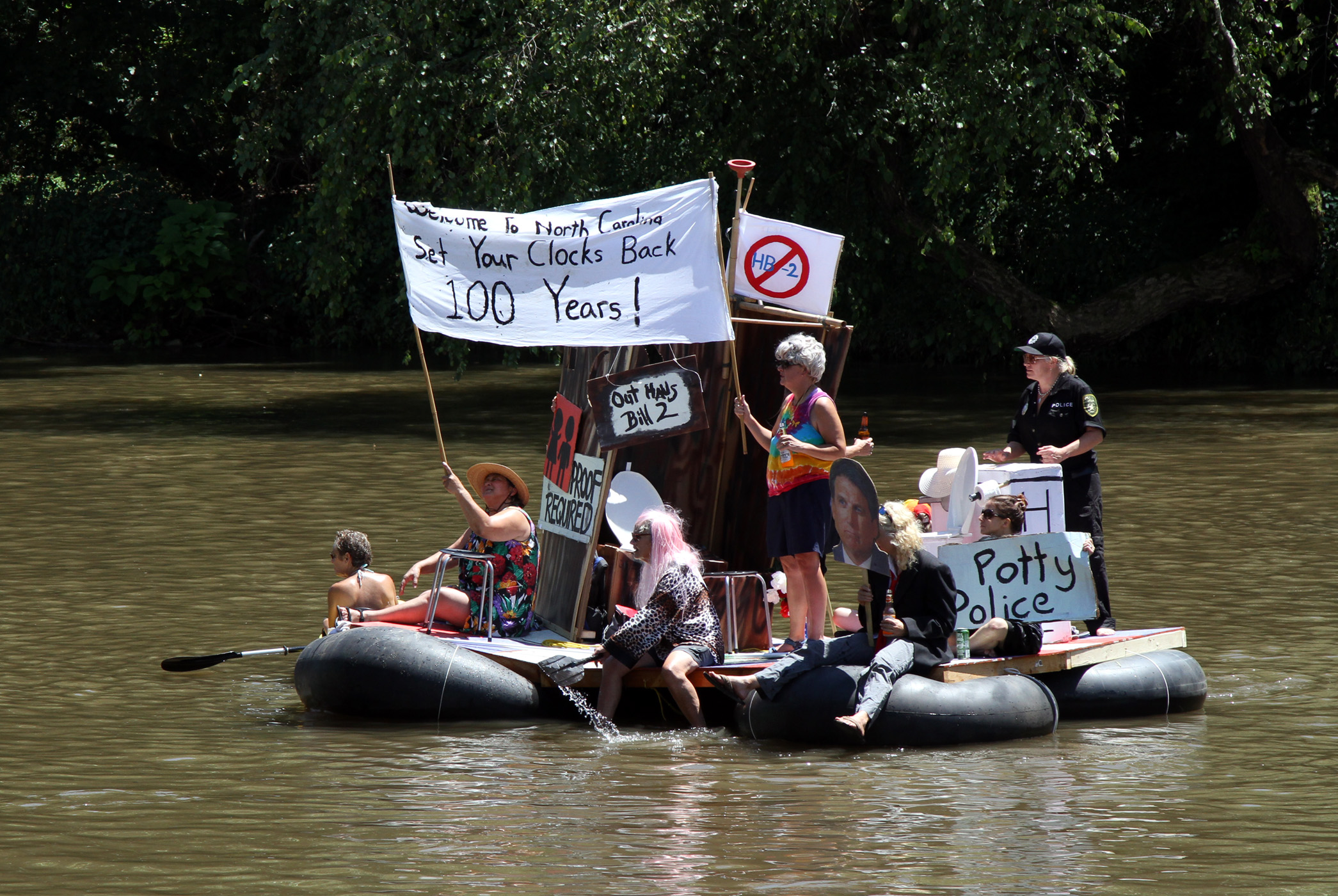
Waterborne protest opposing HB-2

The Public Facilities Privacy & Security Act became law in North Carolina in 2016, although portions of the measure were later repealed in 2017 as part of a compromise between the Democratic governor and Republican-controlled Legislature, and the remaining provisions were sunset in 2020.

On March 23, 2016, North Carolina Governor Pat McCrory (R) signed the Act (commonly known as House Bill 2) into law. The law states that in government buildings, individuals (such as students at state-operated schools) may only use restrooms and changing facilities that correspond to the sex identified on their birth certificates. Transgender persons born in North Carolina can obtain modified birth certificates on which their sex is different from what was originally identified at the time of their birth, but only if they have undergone sex reassignment surgery. For those born in other places, the ability to change the sex listed on a birth certificate is governed by their place of birth (which may have substantially different requirements, and in some cases may not allow such changes).

The law also overturns an LGBT anti-discrimination ordinance that had been passed by Charlotte, North Carolina, prevents local governments in the state from enacting similar ordinances, and prevents cities from raising their minimum wages higher than that of the state.

On August 26, 2016, a U.S. District Court judge granted a preliminary injunction, preventing the University of North Carolina from enforcing the restroom provisions of the law.

On March 30, 2017, the legislature partially repealed House Bill 2, removing the restrictions on restroom use by transgender individuals. The compromise agreement was criticized by both LGBT rights groups and conservatives.

==== Oklahoma ====
On May 25, 2022, Oklahoma Governor Kevin Stitt signed Oklahoma Senate Bill 615 into law that requires students at public charter schools and public schools to use locker rooms and bathrooms that match the sex listed on their birth certificate.

==== South Carolina ====
In April 2016, senator Lee Bright brought a bill (S. 1203) to the South Carolina Senate, that was essentially the same as North Carolina's HB2. The bill would block local governments from passing anti-discriminatory ordinances such as the use of public bathrooms by gay, lesbian, bisexual, and transgender individuals. Bright's bill would maintain that public bathrooms be used in accordance to "biological sex". An online poll taken from a news site stated that 75% of voters did not think the bill was necessary. The legislation failed to meet the crossover deadline for bills to pass from one legislative chamber to the other.

In December 2016, a similar bill was introduced by representative Steven Wayne Long in the South Carolina House (H. 3012).

In May 2026, governor Henry McMaster signed House Bill 4756, "the South Carolina Student Physical Privacy Act,", which mandated that multiple-occupancy restrooms in public schools and colleges be single sex, defined as "biological sex observed or verified at birth". Trans students would be permitted to use single-occupancy restrooms or outdoor porta-potties.

==== South Dakota ====
On February 16, 2016, the South Dakota Senate voted 20–15 to approve a bathroom bill that, had it passed, would have been the first in the country to require public schoolchildren to use facilities that match the sex they were assigned at birth. South Dakota's bill was, according to ADF's legal counsel, based on the ADF's model bathroom bill legislation. On March 1, 2016, the governor of South Dakota, Dennis Daugaard, vetoed the bill. Early in the 2017 legislative session Republican Senator Lance Russell refiled the bathroom bill, but on January 30 he withdrew the bill because Daugaard again promised a veto.

==== Tennessee ====
On April 6, 2016, the Tennessee House Education Administration and Planning Committee, which is part of the Tennessee House of Representatives, approved a bathroom bill that would apply to public schools and colleges in the state and would require students to use a restroom that corresponds with their sex as identified at birth. Before the bill could proceed further, the house sponsor of the bill decided to delay its consideration for a year to allow for further investigation, citing concerns that it could interfere with Title IX funding. In 2017, the bill was re-introduced, but died in the Senate Education Committee.

In 2019, Tennessee governor Bill Lee signed into law legislation that modified the definition of indecent exposure to include acts committed in restrooms and locker rooms if they are designated for use by a single sex and the person committing the act is of the opposite sex (as assigned at birth). The original version of this legislation would have criminalized the mere act of a transgender individual entering a restroom opposite to their sex as assigned at birth, but this provision was eventually removed. Nevertheless, critics of the legislation were still concerned that the bill would be interpreted as condoning harassment of transgender individuals in bathrooms by others who find their presence objectionable.

==== Texas ====
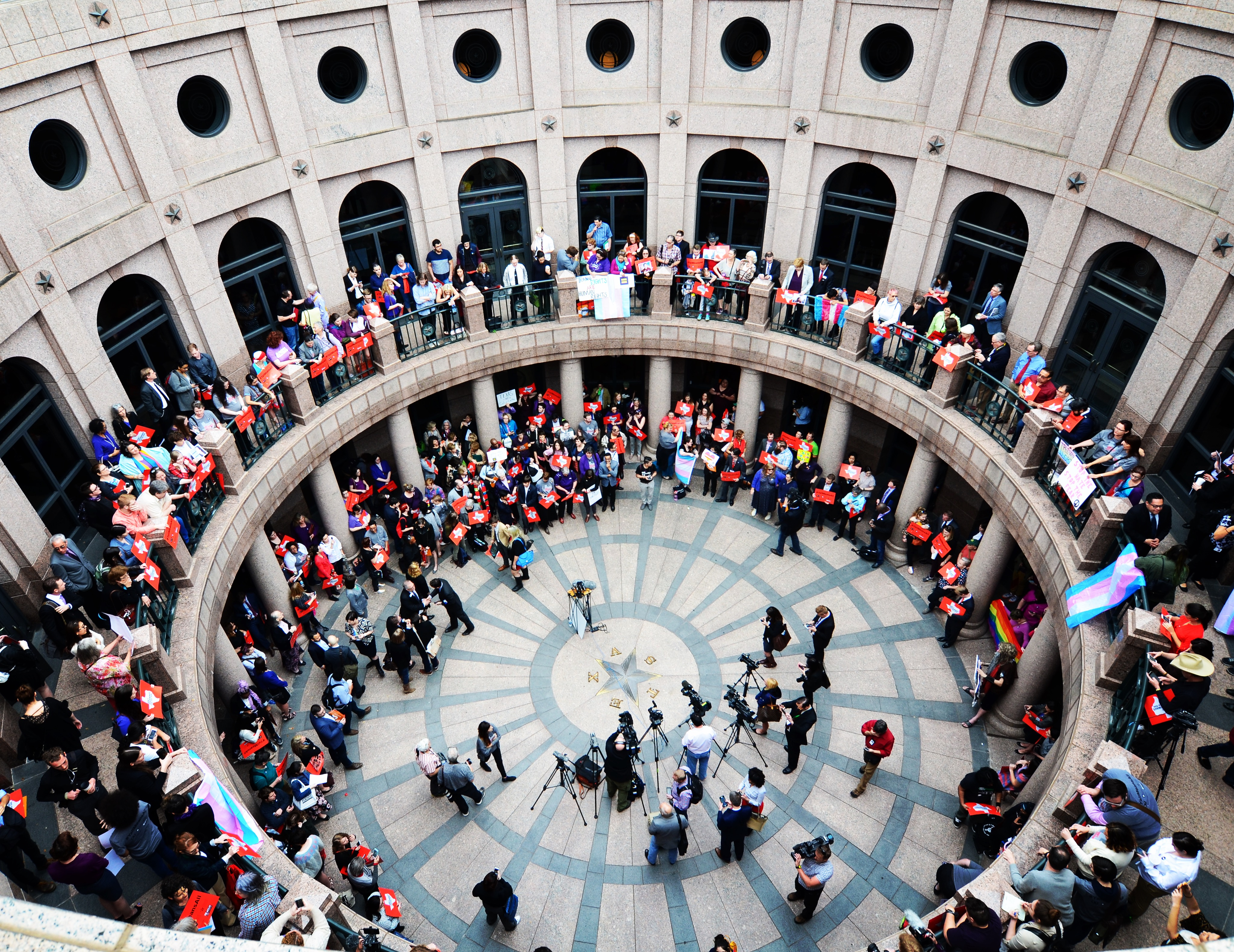
Public opposition to SB6 in the State Capitol

A bill introduced to the Texas House of Representatives in March 2015 proposed that any student who encountered another student who does not identify with their "biological sex" in a shared restroom could be awarded $2,000 in damage reparations for "mental anguish". The school itself would also be liable for failing to take action against known transgender students using their gender identified restroom. An analysis by NBC News determined that the Texas bill was influenced by ADF's model legislation, which also proposes $2,500 in damages per encounter with a transgender person in a shared restroom.

Another bill, introduced to the Texas House in February 2015, suggested that anyone over the age of 13 years found to be in a public restroom of a gender not their own should be charged with a Class A misdemeanor, spend up to a year in jail, and face a $4000 fine. Under this proposed bill, building managers who repeatedly and knowingly allow transgender individuals to use the facility of their gender identity would also face a fine of up to $10,000.

Several bills were filed in both the regular legislative session and first special session of the Texas Legislature in 2017. Sponsored by State Senator Lois Kolkhorst and championed by Lieutenant Governor Dan Patrick, the Texas Senate passed SB6 in the regular session and SB3 in the Special Session by a vote of 21-10 largely along party lines (Senator Eddie Lucio Jr. was the only Democrat to vote in favor of each bill). Neither bill went to the House floor for a vote (although SB6 received a hearing by the House's State Affairs committee). SB6 would have limited bathroom access based on the sex listed on one's birth certificate while SB3 would have allowed an individual to use the restroom listed on several state IDs as well (e.g. driver's license or concealed carry license).

Speaker of the Texas House Joe Straus voiced his opposition to the bills, citing the economic impact that North Carolina saw while HB2 was law. He was also quoted by a New Yorker article as saying, "I'm disgusted by all this. Tell the lieutenant governor I don't want the suicide of a single Texan on my hands."

In September 2018, Kolkhorst indicated that she would try again to pass similar legislation.

In September 2025, Texas Senate Bill 8 (SB 8), also known as the Texas Women's Privacy Act, passed the Texas Legislature and was signed by Governor Greg Abbott. The law, mandating that public multi-occupancy restrooms be strictly segregated by sex assigned at birth, went into effect on December 4, 2025.

==== Vermont ====
On May 11, 2018, Vermont Governor Phil Scott signed a bill requiring all single-user public restrooms to be gender-neutral.

==== Virginia ====
In 2016, Delegate Mark Cole sponsored House Bill 663, a bathroom bill restricting public restroom use according to a person's "anatomical sex", defined as "the physical condition of being male or female, which is determined by a person's anatomy", with violators liable for a civil penalty not to exceed $50. HB663 was introduced on January 11, 2016, and died in committee in February 2016. It was widely reported that HB663 would require adults to inspect the genitals of children before they were allowed to enter the appropriate facilities, but this was dismissed by Snopes as a misleading interpretation of the bill's text, which states that administrators "shall develop and implement policies that require every restroom ... that is designated for use by a specific gender to solely be used by individuals whose anatomical sex matches such gender designation." Cole sponsored House Bill 781 one day later on January 12, 2016, which used the same wording but substituted "biological sex" for "anatomical sex". The use of "biological sex" allowed for an update via amended birth certificate. HB781 also died in committee in February.

In early 2017, HB1612, proposed by Republican Bob Marshall would use the "born sex" to define which restroom, changing facility, or private area in government buildings was permitted for a given individual. HB1612 also stated that individuals that did not use the bathroom of their born sex would be subject to civil action. Additionally, HB1612 required school principals to inform the parents of a child if the child did not wish to identify as their born sex. The bill was killed in subcommittee on January 19, 2017.

A sexual assault in a high school bathroom in Loudoun County garnered national political attention in 2021, but claims that the perpetrator was transgender proved to be false.

==== Washington ====
In early 2015, SB 6548, which would prevent transgender individuals from using the bathroom associated with the gender with which they identify, was introduced in the senate but failed to pass. In December 2015, Washington State's Human Rights Commission enacted a rule that allowed transgender individuals to use bathrooms conforming with their gender identities. Early in 2016, a bill to overturn the ruling (SB 6443) was voted on in the state Senate, and defeated by a margin of 25–24. An attempt to put a state voter initiative on the November 2016 ballot, I-1515, failed to reach the number of signatures necessary to appear on the ballot. On December 5, 2016, a new bill, HB 1011, was pre-filed in the Washington State House. This bill would prevent transgender individuals from using a bathroom of their gender identity unless they have had sex-reassignment surgery, and would prevent local municipalities from enacting ordinances contradicting the directive.

==== Wisconsin ====
In November 2015, Wisconsin held a hearing on a bathroom bill to require public schoolchildren to use facilities that match the sex they were assigned at birth. According to critics, the bill would also violate the federal government's Office for Civil Rights's 2014 statement that federal nondiscrimination law covered gender identity. The following month, the bill was revised to allow public schools to offer gender-neutral bathrooms.

== United Kingdom ==
On 25 April 2025 the Equality and Human Rights Commission (EHRC) released interim guidance following the For Women Scotland Ltd v The Scottish Ministers Supreme Court ruling. The guidance declared trans women to be "biological men" and trans men to be "biological women". The guidance applied to any school, workplace, sporting body, publicly accessible service (such as restaurants, shops, hospitals, or shelters), and any association of 25 people or more. The guidance stated that while trans women and trans men should be barred from facilities, including bathrooms, matching their gender, they can also be restricted from facilities matching their sex, and that only providing mixed-sex facilities could constitute discrimination against women. It did, however, say that trans people should not be left without any facilities to use.

The EHRC interim guidance was described by transgender campaigners as a "bigoted attempt to segregate trans people in public spaces", with campaign groups warning about forced outing and harmful effects on trans lives, and stating it could be in violation of the European Convention on Human Rights.

== Canada ==
In Canada, several bills tried to include gender identity and gender expression among the characteristics protected from discrimination and eligible for consideration in sentencing hate criminals.

In 2009, New Democratic Party (NDP) MP Bill Siksay introduced Bill C-389 to the 40th Parliament. It passed the House of Commons in 2011 and was defeated in the Senate.

Bill C-279, introduced to the 41st Parliament in 2011 by NDP MP Randall Garrison, was passed and sent to the Senate in March 2013. In 2015, Senator Don Plett introduced three amendments, one of which exempted public washrooms and changerooms from protection. It was defeated. Garrison reintroduced it to the 42nd Parliament as Bill C-204.

Bill C-16 was introduced on May 17, 2016, by Minister of Justice Jody Wilson-Raybould to the 42nd Parliament. It passed both houses and became law upon receiving royal assent on June 19, 2017, effective immediately.

== New Zealand ==
On 10 May 2024, the populist New Zealand First party introduced its "Fair Access to Bathrooms Bill" into Parliament, which would require all public buildings to provide clearly demarcated, unisex and single sex bathrooms. The proposed bill would also fine anyone using a single-sex toilet "who is not of the sex for which that toilet has been designated." The New Zealand Labour Party leader Chris Hipkins and Green Party of Aotearoa New Zealand rainbow community spokesperson Kahurangi Carter described the member's bill as an attack on the transgender community.

In mid April 2025, Radio New Zealand reported that NZ First had withdrawn its proposed bathrooms bill. On 22 April, the party's leader Winston Peters also introduced a new member's bill pushing for the term women to be defined under New Zealand law as "an adult human biological female."

== Peru ==
On April 2, 2025, the Congress of the Republic of Peru passed Law 32331, titled the "Law that strengthens the right to sexual integrity of children and adolescents" (Spanish: Ley que fortalece el derecho a la indemnidad sexual de los niños y adolescentes), which prohibits transgender people from using restrooms that correspond to their gender identity in the country. The Peruvian government enacted the law on May 12, 2025, and it was published in El Peruano. The bill was proposed by Congressman Alejandro Muñante of the Popular Renewal party.

== Brazil ==
In Brazil, various bills have been introduced—at the federal, municipal, and state levels—to prohibit transgender people from using restrooms that correspond to their gender identity.

In August 2017, the Sorocaba City Council passed a law prohibiting transgender students from using the women's public restrooms in schools in the city. The law passed by a vote of 15–3. After the law was passed, LGBTQ activists protested against it. In October 2019, the law was overturned by the Court of Justice of São Paulo (TJ-SP).

In March 2026, the Campo Grande City Council approved, by a vote of 13–11, a bill prohibiting transgender women from using women's public restrooms. On April 22, the city's mayor, Adriane Lopes (PP), signed the bill into law. On March 28, the law was reported to Public Prosecutor's Office of Mato Grosso do Sul. On April 29, the state's Public Defender's Office opened an investigation to examine the city's law. On May 5th, Congresswoman Erika Hilton denounced the law to the Brazilian Federal Prosecution Office.

On July 14, 2026, the governor of Pará, Hana Ghassan (MDB), signed a law authorizing religious temples and schools to restrict bathroom use based on biological sex. Before the law was enacted, the Federal Public Prosecutor's Office had recommended that the governor veto it, arguing that it would violate the rights of transgender people and the principle of secularism. On July 15, 2026, the Socialism and Liberty Party announced that it had filed a lawsuit against the law.

== See also ==
- Florida Senate Bill 254 (2023)
- Moral panic
- Unisex changing rooms
- Unisex public toilet
- Workers' right to access the toilet
- Transgender rights in the United States
