= Rihanna Kelver =

LGBT rights activist from Wyoming, United States

Ríhanna Novalee ChasingStars (born 1997 or 1998), also known as Rihanna Kelver, is an LGBT rights activist from Wyoming, United States.

As a high school student, in 2015 and 2016, Kelver led efforts in her school district in Laramie, Wyoming, to adopt policies supporting transgender and gender-nonconforming students. During the first Trump administration (2017–2021), she continued her activism at the University of Wyoming. In 2025, she was arrested and charged after a street confrontation during which she was pushed to the ground and then drew her handgun. A trial is set for late 2026. The New York Times wrote that the situation had caused "an impassioned debate [...] about whether the Second Amendment applies when the person holding the gun is transgender."

== Early life ==
Ríhanna Novalee ChasingStars, also known as Rihanna Kelver, was born in 1997 or 1998. Kelver is a transgender woman. She questioned her gender identity in her early childhood, though she later said that she had "silenced the thought" until she was in high school, when she came out as transgender. She graduated from Laramie High School in Laramie, Wyoming, in 2016.

== Activism ==
During Kelver's senior year of high school, in 2015, she led the school organization Safe Area for Laramie LGBT Youth (SALLY). At the same time, she was part of an ad hoc committee focused on a proposed policy for trans and gender-nonconforming students in the school district. Kelver appeared at school board meetings and created petitions in support of a policy that would allow trans students to access bathrooms matching their gender identity. In 2016, after school officials had not yet moved with forward with any policies regarding trans students, Kelver announced her intent to run for the Laramie school board. The bid was ultimately unsuccessful.

Kelver attended the University of Wyoming in Laramie. Following Donald Trump's election as U.S. president in 2016, she organized a demonstration in downtown Laramie which had 300 participants. Kelver co-organized a protest at the university in support of transgender rights shortly after the Trump administration withdrew the Obama administration's guidance on gender identity under Title IX. More than 100 students and residents participated. In 2020, she was an organizer of a local march that was held amidst protests across the country in response to the murder of George Floyd.

On the day that the 2025 Wyoming House Bill 72 came into effect, Kelver used a bathroom in the Wyoming State Capitol in protest of the law, which bans trans people from using bathrooms that align with their gender identity in certain spaces.

== 2025 street confrontation ==
In September 2025, Kelver was involved in an encounter with three men on the street in Laramie during which she was pushed to the ground and then drew her handgun. She was subsequently arrested and charged with aggravated assault and "possession of a deadly weapon with unlawful intent". The New York Times wrote in 2026 that the "case has touched off an impassioned debate in one of the country's most gun-friendly, staunchly Republican states about whether the Second Amendment applies when the person holding the gun is transgender." Her trial was set for November 2026.

In a September 2026 ruling, a judge denied Kelver's request for immunity.
