= Growing Up Coy =

- Directed by: Eric Juhola
- Produced by: Eric Juhola; Jeremy Stulberg; Randy Stulberg
- Music by: Christopher Libertino
- Production company: Still Point Pictures
- Release date: June 16, 2016 (US)
- Running time: 83 minutes
- Country: United States
- Language: English

Growing Up Coy is a 2016 documentary directed by Eric Juhola and produced by Still Point Pictures. The film documents a landmark 2013 case in which the Colorado Civil Rights Division ruled in favor of allowing transgender six-year-old Coy Mathis to use the girls' bathroom at her elementary school in Fountain, Colorado. The case has been credited with setting off a wave of bathroom bills across the United States in the years following. The film premiered in 2016 at the Human Rights Watch Film Festival and won "Best Documentary" awards at the Raindance Film Festival and BendFilm Festival. It was pitched at the 2014 edition of Sheffield Doc/Fest's MeetMarket. In January 2017, the film was released worldwide on Netflix.

== Plot ==
The film follows Jeremy and Kathryn Mathis and their five children over several years in Colorado. One child, six-year-old Coy Mathis, is a young transgender girl who had come out as transgender in kindergarten. She was able to use the girls' bathroom freely until the first grade when the principal informed the parents that moving forward, Coy would only be able to use the boys bathroom or the nurse's bathroom. Rather than comply, Jeremy and Kathryn pulled their kids from school and worked with the Transgender Legal Defense & Education Fund to file a complaint with the Colorado Civil Rights Division.

While awaiting a decision, the Mathises went public with their case and became a magnet for the issue in an international media firestorm, including a notable appearance on Katie and a spread in Rolling Stone. The film goes on to show how the media pressure put strain on Jeremy and Kathryn's marriage, eventually leading to their separation. In the end, a ruling came down in their favor, enabling transgender people across the state to use facilities that match their gender identity.

The ruling was the first of its kind in the United States, and had ripple effects across the country. Shortly after the ruling, California enacted its own law allowing transgender students to pick bathrooms and sports teams they identify with. The Obama Administration also issued guidelines that protect transgender students using Title IX as the basis for nondiscrimination. Many states resisted the guidelines and proposed so-called bathroom bills, most of which would force transgender students to use that bathroom that matches their birth certificates. So far, one bathroom bill was made into law, HB2 in North Carolina.

== Reception ==
The film has been written about in major publications and lauded for its timeliness and sensitivity around a controversial topic. Cara Buckley of The New York Times wrote that the film could not be timelier, with transgender issues at the fore. Nigel Smith of The Guardian wrote that the film was urgent viewing and more than a simple advocacy film. Daniel Walber of NonFics wrote that the film is a real interrogation of what happens to those who take on the important legal battles of our time. Juhola and Stulberg ask the audience to quite seriously consider what we expect from our civil rights heroes, particularly the ones who do not get to fly home to the big city after the battle. Their message is not simple or straightforward, but contemplative and admirably honest.
