= Texas Senate Bill 8 (2025) =

2025 Texas bathroom law

Senate Bill 8

Texas Legislature
- Long title: AN ACT relating to the designation and use of certain spaces and facilities according to sex; authorizing a civil penalty and a private civil right of action.
- Territorial extent: Texas
- Enacted by: Texas Senate
- Enacted by: Texas House of Representatives

Legislative history

Initiating chamber: Texas Senate
- Introduced: August 15, 2025
- First reading: August 15, 2025
- Second reading: August 18, 2025
- Voting summary: 19 voted for; 11 voted against
- Third reading: August 19, 2025
- Voting summary: 19 voted for; 11 voted against

Revising chamber: Texas House of Representatives
- Received from the Texas Senate: August 20, 2025
- First reading: August 20, 2025
- Second reading: August 28, 2025
- Third reading: August 28, 2025
- Voting summary: 86 voted for; 45 voted against; 1 present not voting

Final stages
- Finally passed both chambers: September 3, 2025
- Status: In force

Texas Senate Bill 8 (SB 8), also known as the Texas Women's Privacy Act, is a 2025 law in the state of Texas that prohibits people from using public bathrooms that differ from their sex assigned at birth. It passed the Texas Legislature during a special session on September 3, 2025, and was signed by Governor Greg Abbott on September 22. The law went into effect on December 4, 2025.

It is commonly referred to as a bathroom bill due to the effects it has transgender and intersex people in the state, who prefer to use facilities that align with their gender identity. As of September 2025, it is the most severe passed bathroom bill in the United States in terms of penalties.

== Background ==
Texas has a history of attempting to pass bills targeting bathroom access, though Senate Bill 8 was the first successful one. Six different bathroom bills have passed the Texas Senate since 2017, though none made it through the Texas House of Representatives. The first bill was introduced in 2015. A bathroom bill was passed in Odessa in 2024.

In June 2025, the Texas Legislature passed House Bill 229, which modifies the definition of sex, gender, and related terms in state law. That law took effect on September 1, 2025.

== Provisions ==
Senate Bill 8 restricts access to bathrooms and locker rooms in government facilities, K-12 schools and universities by tying it to sex assigned at birth. Transgender prisoners are also prohibited from being switched to a prison that aligns with their gender identity.

Any facility which violates the provisions set out in Senate Bill 8 are fined $25,000 the first time and $125,000 for any subsequent violations, which are counted daily. Reports from private citizens are handled by the Texas Attorney General's office. The fines were quintupled in an amendment to the bill before passage, as the fines were previously $5,000 and $25,000.

== Enforcement ==
On December 17, 2025, the office of Texas attorney general Ken Paxton launched a tip line and complaint form for the public to report suspected violations of the law.

== Legal Challenges and Impact ==
Following the enactment of Senate Bill 8, it prompted legal scrutiny and policy changes at the local level. Civil rights organizations, like the EEOC, signaled legal challenges. They argued that the law may conflict with federal protections against sex based discrimination, including interpretation of Title IX and Civil Rights Act of 1964.

At the municipal level, some local governments and institutions explored mitigation strategies. In December of 2025, Austin City Council approved measures to expand access to single occupancy restrooms in public buildings in response to the law's implementation. Colleges and universities across Texas also reviewed campus policies to ensure compliance while attempting to address concerns from students and staff members. Universities like UTSA and Texas State University reviewed policies to determine if they were in compliance with the bill.

The law has also had social and economic implications. Advocacy groups reported concerns about potential impacts on tourism, workforce recruitment, and business investment, citing backlash seen in other states that passed similar legislation. Supporters of the law, however, state that it provides clarity regarding the use of public restroom facilities based on sex assigned at birth.

== See also ==
- Bathroom bill
- LGBTQ rights in Texas
