= Texas House Bill 229 =

2025 law in U.S. state

House Bill 229

Texas House of Representatives
- Long title: AN ACT relating to general definitions for and collection of governmental information regarding biological sex.
- Territorial extent: Texas
- Enacted by: Texas House of Representatives
- Enacted: May 9, 2025
- Enacted by: Texas Senate
- Signed by: Greg Abbott
- Signed: June 20, 2025

Initiating chamber: Texas House of Representatives
- Introduced by: Ellen Troxclair

Summary
- Modifies the definition of gender and sex-related terms in state law to align with biological sex and requires the collection and modification of state records and documents to align with the new definitions.
- Status: In force

Texas House Bill 229 (HB 229), also known as the Women's Bill of Rights, is a 2025 law in the state of Texas that modifies the definitions of gender, sex, and related terms in state law. It was signed into law by Governor Greg Abbott on June 20, 2025.

House Bill 229 could revert up to 120,000 transgender Texans' state records and documents and require them to match their biological sex instead of gender identity. It has been accused of being anti-transgender and harmful to intersex and non-binary people.

== Provisions ==
House Bill 229 defines female and woman as somebody who can produce ovum and male and man as somebody who can fertilize ovum, often referred to as the binary. It also requires state agencies to collect vital records on all Texans to determine them as either female or male based on the new definitions, and update them accordingly. The bill separately describes men as "bigger, stronger, and faster than females."

== See also ==
- LGBTQ rights in Texas
- Texas Senate Bill 14 (2023)
