= Gloucester County Public Schools =

Public school division in Virginia, United States

Gloucester County Public Schools is a Virginia public school division serving Gloucester County, Virginia.

The school division operates eight schools: five elementary (grades K-5), two intermediate (grades 6–8), and one high school (grades 9–12). There have been numerous proposals for the school system to switch to year-round school like a few neighboring counties, but the board has rejected each proposal.

== Elementary schools ==
In Gloucester County the five elementary schools start class at 9:00 am and end 3:50 pm. The five schools are as follows:

Abingdon (Panthers), Achilles (Warriors), Bethel (Bears), Botetourt (Bulldogs), and Petsworth (patriots).

Unlike the middle and high schools, these schools give a group of around twenty students to a teacher for a whole school year.

== Middle schools ==
Gloucester County also has two middle schools that start at 7:20 am with homeroom and end at 2:40 pm. The schools' names are Peasley (Lions), and Page (Eagles). On April 16, 2011, part of Page Middle School was destroyed by a tornado that passed through the area. The 6th and 7th grades of Page were moved to Peasley the following school year while the 8th grade of Peasley and Page were moved to trailers located near the Gloucester High School campus. Page was rebuilt in a different location on TC Walker Rd, and opened for use September 2015.

== High school ==
The county has one high school, simply called Gloucester High School (GHS). The school mascot is the former Duke of Gloucester, and school hours are 7:45 am to 2:46 pm. Advanced classes are offered in English, Foreign Language, History, and Mathematics. In mathematics, attendees can take courses two years before they are required, and in language, students can take "advanced language", which is at a higher level than their peers. In history, a student can take AP or Dual Enrollment Courses

== Transgender policy controversy ==
In December 2014, the GCPS Board passed a policy to restrict the use of its schools' single-sex bathroom and locker room facilities "to the corresponding biological genders". The policy was made after receiving a complaint about a student, Gavin Grimm, a transgender boy attending Gloucester High School. Grimm sued the Board, and won in the Fourth Circuit Court of Appeals, which held that discrimination on the basis of gender identity is a form of discrimination on the basis of sex in violation of Title IX of the 1972 Education Amendments. Then in August 2016, the Supreme Court issued a stay of the Circuit Court's decision, and in October 2016, the Supreme Court agreed to take up the case. In August 2021, a settlement was announced under which the district agreed to pay the student $1.3 million for his legal fees.
