= LGBTQ rights in Wyoming =

- Wyoming (USA)
- Legal status: Legal since 1977
- Gender identity: State requires sex reassignment surgery to alter sex on birth certificate
- Discrimination protections: Protections in employment for sexual orientation and gender identity (see below)

Family rights
- Recognition of relationships: Same-sex marriage since 2014
- Adoption: Full adoption rights since 2014

Lesbian, gay, bisexual, transgender, and queer (LGBTQ) people in the U.S. state of Wyoming may face some legal challenges not experienced by non-LGBTQ residents. Same-sex sexual activity has been legal in Wyoming since 1977, and same-sex marriage was legalized in the state in October 2014. Wyoming statutes do not address discrimination on the basis of sexual orientation and gender identity; however, the U.S. Supreme Court's ruling in Bostock v. Clayton County established that employment discrimination against LGBTQ people is illegal under federal law. In addition, the cities of Jackson, Casper, and Laramie have enacted ordinances outlawing discrimination in housing and public accommodations that cover sexual orientation and gender identity.

Wyoming attracted international notoriety after the death of Matthew Shepard in 1998. In 2009, the Matthew Shepard and James Byrd Jr. Hate Crimes Prevention Act was passed by the U.S. Congress expanding the federal definition of hate crimes to include among others sexual orientation and gender identity. According to media outlets, his murder has resulted in "a shift in American culture" toward LGBT rights. A 2017 poll found a majority of Wyoming residents are in favor of same-sex marriage and an anti-discrimination law covering LGBTQ people. However, anti-gay attitudes and behaviors still persist.

== History ==
The Arapaho, who now live on the Wind River Indian Reservation, recognize males who act, behave and live as women, referred to as haxu'xan. The haxu'xan, like women, are traditionally in charge of food preparation and dressing hides to make clothing and bedding. They form a "third gender" in Arapaho society, and can even marry men. The Arapaho believe their gender is "a supernatural gift from birds and animals".

At its creation in 1868, the Wyoming Territory adopted all its laws from the Dakota Territory. This included a penalty of life imprisonment for sodomy. Amendments in 1890 made fellatio and mutual masturbation with a partner younger than 21 years of age, whether heterosexual or homosexual, criminal offenses. The penalty for sodomy was changed to a maximum of five years' imprisonment. In 1951, a psychopathic offender law was enacted, under which those convicted of sodomy could be "mentally examined".

Despite this, Wyoming is the only U.S. state that has no published sodomy cases.

== Law regarding same-sex sexual activity ==
Wyoming decriminalized consensual sodomy in February 1977. The age of consent for all consensual sexual activity is 17.

Initially, the repeal of the sodomy law did not affect the common-law crimes reception statute, thus leaving anal intercourse an indictable offence. This was abrogated in 1982.

== Recognition of same-sex relationships ==
=== Marriage ===
Wyoming has recognized same-sex marriage since October 21, 2014, following the decision of state officials not to appeal a federal court decision that found the state's ban on same-sex marriage unconstitutional. Wyoming previously recognized the legal relationships of same-sex couples only for the purpose of divorce. It had prohibited same-sex marriage by statute since 1977 and enacted a more explicit ban in 2003.

Wyoming Governor Matt Mead said that the state would continue to defend its ban despite action by the U.S. Supreme Court on October 6, 2014, which left standing as binding precedent on courts in Wyoming rulings of the Tenth Circuit Court of Appeals that found bans on same-sex marriage unconstitutional. In the case of Guzzo v. Mead, U.S. District Judge Scott Skavdahl ruled for the plaintiffs challenging the state's ban on same-sex marriage on October 17. His ruling took effect on October 21 when state officials notified the court that they would not appeal his ruling.

=== Domestic partnerships ===
On January 14, 2013, legislators filed a bill creating domestic partnerships to allow same-sex couples to "obtain the rights, responsibilities, protections and legal benefits provided in Wyoming for immediate family members." Legislators who favored same-sex marriage supported the legislative tactic of offering the alternatives. Governor Matt Mead said he favored domestic partnerships. On January 28, a House committee approved the domestic partnership bill 7–2. The full House rejected it, however, on January 30, 2013 in a 24–35 vote.

== Adoption and parenting ==
Married same-sex couples are permitted to adopt, and lesbian couples can access assisted reproduction services, such as in vitro fertilization. State law recognizes the non-genetic, non-gestational mother as a legal parent to a child born via donor insemination, irrespective of the marital status of the parents. Wyoming law also does not explicitly prohibit surrogacy. As a result, surrogacy is presumably legal in the state for both opposite-sex and same-sex couples. Wyoming law specifically states that it "does not authorize or prohibit" gestational surrogacy contracts, leaving surrogacy up to judicial review on a case-by-case basis. In August 2021, Wyoming signed and implemented a bill to explicitly legalize any surrogacy contracts and/or arrangements by legislation. However within the legislation the terms "mother and father" (instead of "parent" or "parents") are explicitly used - to exclude both single people and same-sex couples.

== Discrimination protections ==
Map of Wyoming cities that had sexual orientation and/or gender identity anti–employment discrimination ordinances prior to Bostock Sexual orientation and gender identity with anti–employment discrimination ordinance Sexual orientation in public employment

State statutes do not address discrimination based on sexual orientation or gender identity. On January 31, 2011, the state House rejected a bill banning such discrimination. Likewise, on January 31, 2013, the state Senate rejected a similar bill by a vote of 15 to 13.

At the start of the 2015 legislative session, a business coalition, Compete Wyoming, was formed to push for LGBTQ anti-discrimination laws. On February 3, 2015, the Senate Judiciary Committee approved 6–1 a bill that would have prohibited discrimination based on sexual orientation or gender identity. The bill, SF 115, contained a religious exemption, unlike bills that failed in previous legislative sessions. On February 10, the full Senate approved the bill on a 24–6 vote. On February 20, the bill was approved by the House Labor, Health and Social Services Committee, by a 6–2 margin. On February 24, 2015, the House rejected the bill, in 26–33 vote.

Jackson, Casper and Laramie have anti-discrimination ordinances that cover sexual orientation and gender identity in employment, housing and public accommodations. Other cities, including the state capital of Cheyenne and Gillette, prohibit city employment on the basis of sexual orientation only.

=== Bostock v. Clayton County ===
On June 15, 2020, the U.S. Supreme Court ruled in Bostock v. Clayton County, consolidated with Altitude Express, Inc. v. Zarda, and in R.G. & G.R. Harris Funeral Homes Inc. v. Equal Employment Opportunity Commission that discrimination in the workplace on the basis of sexual orientation or gender identity is discrimination on the basis of sex, and Title VII therefore protects LGBT employees from discrimination.

== Hate crime law ==
Wyoming does not have a hate crime law. In 1999, following the murder of Matthew Shepard near Laramie, Wyoming, such legislation was "hotly debated." Proponents of such legislation since then have preferred the term "bias crime."

== Transgender rights ==
In order for transgender people to change the gender marker on their Wyoming birth certificate, they must undergo sex reassignment surgery and receive a court order stating that their sex has been changed. Consequently, the applicant must submit to the Vital Statistics Services a letter stating their wish to have their gender marker changed, a photocopy of the current ID, a certified copy of the court order and a letter from a doctor that reassignment surgery has been performed. The Department of Transportation will correct the gender marker on a driver's license and state ID card upon receipt of a completed "Gender Designation Change Request Form" signed by the applicant and a physician, therapist or counselor, psychiatric social worker or other medical or social service provider confirming the applicant's gender identity.

=== Sports ===
In March 2023, a bill passed the Wyoming Legislature that would legally ban transgender athletes from playing on any female sports and athletics teams explicitly. Mark Gordon, the Governor of Wyoming, took no action on the bill (i.e. no veto or signature), and so the bill automatically became law and went into effect July 1, 2023.

=== Sexual reassignment surgery and gender-affirming healthcare on children prohibited ===
In March 2024, a bill overwhelmingly passed both houses of the Wyoming Legislature explicitly banning and prohibiting "sexual reassignment surgery and gender-affirming care on children". Mark Gordon, the Governor of Wyoming, signed the bill into law, in preparation for it to go into legal effect from July 1.

=== Transgender bathroom ban ===
In April 2025, Mark Gordon, the Governor of Wyoming, signed into law House Bill 72, requiring all public restrooms in the state to be segregated by biological sex. The new law takes effect July 1, 2025.

== Education ==
In February 2022, the state Senate passed a bill to end funding to the University of Wyoming's Gender and Women's Studies program. Senator Charles Scott, the chair of the Education Committee, called it "an extremely biased, ideologically driven program" with no "academic legitimacy". The bill failed to pass the state House.

== Obscenity material ==
In Wyoming, a law still bans "obscenity material", which affects certain LGBT books and other items within state libraries. In October 2021, a local librarian within Gillette was charged under a district attorney office and faced court over "obscenity material" charges by the Sheriff's office.

== Public opinion ==
A 2017 Public Religion Research Institute (PRRI) opinion poll found that 62% of Wyoming residents supported same-sex marriage, while 30% opposed it and 8% were unsure. A 2019 poll shows 64% of Wyoming residents support discrimination protections while 24% opposed it. However, 41% also supported religiously based refusals to serve gay and lesbian people while 52% opposed it.

By 2020, same-sex marriage had become so well-settled in Wyoming that pollsters stopped asking such questions.

Public opinion for LGBTQ anti-discrimination laws in Wyoming
| Poll source | Date(s) administered | Sample size | Margin of error | % support | % opposition | % no opinion |
|---|---|---|---|---|---|---|
| Public Religion Research Institute | January 2-December 30, 2019 | 155 | ? | 64% | 24% | 12% |
| Public Religion Research Institute | January 3-December 30, 2018 | 136 | ? | 61% | 37% | 2% |
| Public Religion Research Institute | April 5-December 23, 2017 | 236 | ? | 66% | 26% | 8% |
| Public Religion Research Institute | April 29, 2015-January 7, 2016 | 213 | ? | 66% | 30% | 4% |

== Summary table ==
| Same-sex sexual activity legal | Yes (Since 1977) |
| Equal age of consent | Yes (Since 1977) |
| Anti-discrimination laws for sexual orientation | No / Yes (In employment, not housing nor public accommodations) |
| Anti-discrimination laws for gender identity or expression | No / Yes (In employment, not housing nor public accommodations) |
| Same-sex marriages | Yes (Since 2014) |
| Stepchild and joint adoption by same-sex couples | Yes (Since 2014) |
| Lesbian, gay and bisexual people allowed to serve openly in the military | Yes (Since 2011) |
| Transgender people allowed to serve openly in the military | No (Since 2025) |
| Intersex people allowed to serve openly in the military | No (Current DoD policy bans "hermaphrodites" from serving or enlisting in the military) |
| Right to change legal gender | Yes (Requires sex reassignment surgery) |
| Conversion therapy banned on minors | No |
| Access to IVF for lesbian couples | Yes |
| Surrogacy arrangements legal for gay male couples | Yes |
| MSMs allowed to donate blood | Yes (Since 2023) |

== See also ==
- Politics of Wyoming
