= Wyoming House Bill 72 =

2025 Wyoming law

Protecting Privacy in Public Spaces Act

Wyoming Legislature
- Long title: AN ACT relating to the administration of the government; specifying requirements for the use of sex-designated restrooms, showers, sleeping quarters and locker room facilities at public facilities; providing for complaints and civil actions; specifying duties for public entities; providing definitions; making conforming amendments; and providing for an effective date.
- Territorial extent: Wyoming
- Enacted by: Wyoming House of Representatives
- Enacted: February 27, 2025
- Enacted by: Wyoming Senate
- Signed by: Mark Gordon
- Signed: March 3, 2025
- Effective: July 1, 2025

Legislative history

First chamber: Wyoming House of Representatives
- Introduced by: Martha Lawley (R-27)
- Introduced: January 2, 2025
- Second reading: February 6, 2025
- Third reading: February 7, 2025
- Voting summary: 52 voted for; 8 voted against; 2 abstained

Second chamber: Wyoming Senate
- Second reading: February 24, 2025
- Third reading: February 26, 2025
- Voting summary: 25 voted for; 6 voted against

Summary
- Prohibits Wyomingites from using bathrooms that do not align with their biological sex, with limited exceptions.
- Status: In force

Wyoming House Bill 72 (HB0072), also known as the Protecting Privacy in Public Spaces Act, is a 2025 law in the state of Wyoming that bans transgender Wyomingites from using bathrooms in certain public spaces that align with their gender identity, namely trans women. It was introduced by Representative Martha Lawley. HB0072 took effect on July 1, 2025, though lawsuits are pending.

== Provisions ==
HB0072 restricts transgender Wyomingites from using bathrooms that align with their gender identity in facilities managed by the state (such as prisons and government facilities), colleges, and the University of Wyoming. Other facilities such as K–12 schools are not included in HB0072. Exemptions are included for facility staff, among other specific groups. The bill also allows individuals to sue facilities if they allow transgender individuals to use bathrooms that align with their gender identity.

== Reactions ==
=== Support ===
The Christian Post released an article after governor Mark Gordon signed the bill into law, referring to trans women as "trans-identified males."

=== Opposition ===
Wyoming Equality opposed SB0072, stating that it did "more harm than good."

== See also ==
- LGBTQ rights in Wyoming
