= Texas Senate Bill 14 (2023) =

2023 Texas law

Texas Legislature
- Long title: AN ACT relating to prohibitions on the provision to certain children of procedures and treatments for gender transitioning, gender reassignment, or gender dysphoria and on the use of public money or public assistance to provide those procedures and treatments.
- Territorial extent: Texas
- Passed by: Texas Senate
- Passed: May 17, 2023
- Passed by: Texas House of Representatives
- Passed: May 15, 2023
- Signed by: Greg Abbott
- Signed: June 2, 2023
- Effective: September 1, 2023
- Introduced: March 8, 2023

Summary
- Prohibits medical professionals from administering gender-affirming medical care to Texans under eighteen years of age.
- Status: In force

Texas Senate Bill 14 (SB 14) is a 2023 law in the state of Texas that prohibits most forms of gender-affirming care for minors. It passed the Texas Legislature in May 2023 and was signed into law by Governor Greg Abbott on June 2, 2023.

SB 14 was challenged in court in July 2023 by different legal groups, including the American Civil Liberties Union, in Loe v. Texas. The Supreme Court of Texas upheld the law on June 28, 2024, in an 8-1 ruling.

== Provisions ==
Senate Bill 14 prohibits medical professionals from administering gender-affirming care, such as hormone replacement therapy (HRT) and puberty blockers, to Texans under eighteen years of age. It requires the Texas Medical Board to revoke licenses from medical professionals who violate SB 14. Said professionals may also be sued for violations of the law.

== Reactions ==
=== Support ===
Nearly all Republican members of the Texas Legislature supported SB 14. Lieutenant Governor Dan Patrick endorsed the bill, calling gender-affirming care for minors "abhorrent."

=== Opposition ===
The Austin City Council passed a resolution in May 2024 stating that they would not enforce SB 14 in Austin.
