= School Success and Opportunity Act =

2013 California anti-discrimination law

California State Legislature
- Full name: School Success and Opportunity Act
- Introduced: February 22, 2013
- Assembly voted: July 3, 2013
- Senate voted: July 3, 2013
- Signed into law: August 12, 2013
- Sponsor(s): Sen. Mark Leno, Assem. Tom Ammiano
- Governor: Jerry Brown
- Code: Education Code
- Section: Section 221.5
- Resolution: AB 1266
- Website: http://www.leginfo.ca.gov/pub/13-14/bill/asm/ab_1251-1300/ab_1266_cfa_20130501_170107_asm_floor.html

Status: Current legislation

The School Success and Opportunity Act (Assembly Bill 1266), is a California state law which extends gender identity and gender expression discrimination protection to transgender and gender-nonconforming K-12 students in public schools.

== Provisions and enactment ==
The bill "requires that a pupil be permitted to participate in sex-segregated school programs, activities, including athletic teams and competitions, and use facilities consistent with his or her gender identity, irrespective of the gender listed on the pupil's records."

The bill was introduced by Assemblyman Tom Ammiano. It passed the California State Legislature in July 2013 and was signed into law by Governor Jerry Brown in August 2013. The legislation went into effect on January 1, 2014. The bill was opposed by the California Catholic Conference, which viewed the law as unnecessary.

== Opposition and failed repeal effort ==
The "Privacy for All Students" coalition, a conservative group opposed to the legislation, sought to place a referendum on the ballot to overturn the law. Secretary of State of California Debra Bowen determined that the threshold of votes necessary to force the referendum had not been reached because 5,000 petition signatures from Mono and Tulare counties had not been submitted by a November 10, 2013 deadline. The conservative legal group Pacific Justice Institute, representing opponents of AB 1266, challenged Bowen's decision in court, and in January 2015, Judge Allen Sumner of the Sacramento County Superior Court ordered Bowen to accept the signatures, ruling that submission of the signatures on November 12 was timely because the previous two days were a Sunday and a holiday. Judge Sumner wrote: "Ever since the voters enacted the referendum power in 1911, courts have liberally construed its provisions to protect the voters' power. The fact the deadline for submitting petitions falls on a weekend preceding a holiday, or the county registrar closes at noon on Friday, should not prevent Petitioner from having her petition signatures accepted."

In February 2014, the effort to repeal A.B. 1266 failed after it fell "about 17,000 signatures short of the 504,760 valid names needed to go before voters."
