= Gender identity under Title IX =

Gender identity in educational settings

Title IX of the United States Education Amendments of 1972 prohibits discrimination "on the basis of sex" in educational programs and activities that receive financial assistance from the federal government. The validity of each respective executive administration's interpretation is being tested in the federal courts, most recently in the 2025 instances of West Virginia v. B. P. J., Tennessee v. Cardona and United States v. California Interscholastic Federation.

The Obama administration interpreted Title IX to cover discrimination on the basis of assigned sex, gender identity, and transgender status; protections against sexual assault and harassment were strengthened and extended to transgender students, including rights to use bathrooms and locker rooms consistent with their gender identity. The first Trump administration determined that Title IX’s prohibition on sex discrimination did not apply to personal gender identity and that the question of access to sex-segregated facilities should be left to the states and local school districts to decide. During the Biden administration, the Department of Education reinstated and expanded protections for LGBTQ+ individuals to include discrimination based on sexual orientation, gender identity, and sex characteristics. This interpretation was based on the 2024 Title IX Final Rule as well as Bostock v. Clayton County. Upon Donald Trump’s return to office, his administration expanded the power of the executive branch’s interpretation, reverting 2020 regulations on Title IX protections through executive orders such as Defending Women from Gender Ideology Extremism and Restoring Biological Truth to the Federal Government and Keeping Men Out of Women's Sports.

== Background ==
Congress kept the core provision of Title IX very brief, only one sentence long. The interpretation and implementation of Title IX was left to the executive, whom Congress expressly "authorized and directed to effectuate the [statute] by issuing rules, regulations, or orders of general applicability which shall be consistent with achievement of [its] objectives ..."

President Richard Nixon initially directed the Department of Health, Education and Welfare (HEW) to carry this out. In 1980, HEW was split into two separate agencies —the Department of Health and Human Services (HHS) and the Department of Education (DOE). Primary responsibility for Title IX enforcement in educational institutions was delegated to DOE's Office for Civil Rights (OCR).

== Views of the Obama administration ==
The Obama administration's efforts to apply Title IX to protect LGBT students go back to President Obama's first term in office. In an October 2010 "Dear Colleague" letter, the OCR issued guidance on clarifying that Title IX protects LGBT students from harassment on the basis of sex stereotypes. Specifically, the OCR stated that, although Title IX does not prohibit discrimination based on sexual orientation, "[t]he fact that the harassment [of a hypothetical gender non-conforming student] includes anti‐LGBT comments or is partly based on the target's actual or perceived sexual orientation does not relieve a school of its obligation under Title IX to investigate and remedy overlapping sexual harassment or gender‐based harassment." In a 2014 Q&A document, the OCR wrote unequivocally that "Title IX's sex discrimination prohibition extends to claims of discrimination based on gender identity or failure to conform to stereotypical notions of masculinity or femininity and OCR accepts such complaints for investigation."

Simultaneously with evolving subregulatory guidance, OCR started conducting enforcement actions under Title IX against school districts where discrimination against transgender students was alleged to have taken place. For example, in 2013, OCR reached a settlement with the Arcadia (Calif.) Unified School District, stemming from the complaint by a transgender boy, who was denied the use of boys' restrooms and locker rooms and was required to sleep alone in a separate cabin on an overnight school trip. In reaching the conclusion that Title IX applied to the facts of the Arcadia case, OCR took the position discriminating against a transgender student can be a form of sex discrimination, and that the scope of Title IX should be analyzed in light of parallel precedent under Title VII of the Civil Rights Act of 1964, which prohibits discrimination on the basis of "sex" in an employment context. Title VII has also been interpreted to encompass discrimination based on sex stereotypes, gender identity, and transgender status by the EEOC and many federal courts.

=== 2016 Dear Colleague letter ===
On May 13, 2016, the Department of Justice (DOJ) and DOE issued joint guidance to educational institutions on the scope of Title IX, in the form of a Dear Colleague letter and an accompanying compendium of actual policies and practices, which had previously been enacted by state agencies and school districts throughout the U.S. The guidance formalized the administration's previously stated view that Title IX prohibits discrimination on the basis of gender identity and clarified that transgender students should therefore be treated consistent with their gender identity at school.

In practical terms, the administration instructed schools that Title IX's prohibition on discrimination means that schools generally must:

- provide an environment free of sex-based harassment,
- honor transgender students' names and pronouns,
- permit all students to participate in sex-segregated activities and use sex-segregated facilities (including bathrooms, locker rooms, and overnight accommodations) in accordance with their gender identity, and
- protect transgender students' privacy by avoiding non-consensual disclosure of their gender status.

The guidance permitted a limited exception for athletics, where accommodating transgender students would impair "the competitive fairness or physical safety of the sport."

Reactions to the Dear Colleague letter were sharply polarized. Head of the DOJ Civil Rights Division Vanita Gupta expressed hope that the guidance would give transgender students "a safe, supportive environment that allows them to thrive and grow." First Lady of New York City Chirlane McCray spoke approvingly of the guidance, saying that it "reaffirms a basic human right." Chad Griffin of the Human Rights Campaign said that the guidance "sen[t] a message that every student deserves to be treated fairly and supported by their teachers and schools."

Conservative politicians voiced opposition to the letter. Texas Lt. Governor Dan Patrick urged school officials to disregard the administration's Title IX guidance, which he considered "blackmail." Republican presidential candidate Donald Trump called on the federal government to take no position on discrimination against transgender students, which in his view should be an issue for the states. Rep. Brian Babin [R-TX] introduced HR 5294 to invalidate the "Dear Colleague" letter until superseded by an Act of Congress. In 2016 (HR 5812), and again in 2017 (HR 2796) after the prior bill had died in committee, Rep. Pete Olson [R-TX] introduced federal legislation which would limit gender identity to biological assignation, which would remove the ability to apply federal civil rights protections to transgender individuals. Olson stated the legislation was in reaction to "the Obama Administration strongly [overreaching] by unilaterally redefining the definition of "sex" with respect to the Civil Rights Act outside of the lawmaking process." Olson went on to call on Congress to "reject the notion of false power stolen from Congress by a White House seeking to impose social policy on America."

== Views of Trump's first administration ==
In February 2017, the Department of Justice and Department of Education under the Trump administration withdrew the guidance on gender identity issued by the Obama administration. A letter issued by the departments cited a need to "more completely consider the legal issues involved", and stated that "there must be due regard for the primary role of the States and local school districts in establishing education policy".

In June 2017, Acting Assistant Secretary for Civil Rights Candice Jackson issued instructions to directors of DoEdE's regional civil rights offices, providing that, although the Obama-era guidance had been rescinded, they may investigate and resolve certain kinds of allegations of sex discrimination involving transgender students, such as "failure to promptly and equitably resolve a transgender student's complaint of sex discrimination; ... failure to assess whether sexual harassment (i.e., unwelcome conduct of a sexual nature) or gender-based harassment (i.e., based on sex stereotyping, such as acts of verbal, nonverbal, or physical aggression, intimidation, or hostility based on sex or sex-stereotyping, such as refusing to use a transgender student's preferred name or pronouns when the school uses preferred names for gender-conforming students or when the refusal is motivated by animus toward people who do not conform to sex stereotypes) of a transgender student created a hostile environment; ... failure to take steps reasonably calculated to address sexual or gender-based harassment that creates a hostile environment; ... retaliation against a transgender student after concerns about possible sex discrimination were brought to the recipient's attention; ... and different treatment based on sex stereotyping (e.g., based on a student's failure to conform to stereotyped notions of masculinity or femininity)."

In February 2018, a DoEd spokesperson clarified that "Title IX prohibits discrimination on the basis of sex, not gender identity ... Where students, including transgender students, are penalized or harassed for failing to conform to sex-based stereotypes, that is sex discrimination prohibited by Title IX ... In the case of bathrooms, however, long-standing regulations provide that separating facilities on the basis of sex is not a form of discrimination prohibited by Title IX."

In October 2018, The New York Times obtained a memo issued by the Department of Health and Human Services that would propose a strict definition of gender for Title IX, using the person's sex as assigned at birth and could not be changed, effectively eliminating recognition of transgender students and potentially others. The memo stated that the government needed to define gender "on a biological basis that is clear, grounded in science, objective and administrable". The news brought immediate protests in several locations as well as online social media under the "#WontBeErased" hashtag.

== Views of the Biden administration ==
Upon his inauguration on January 20, 2021, Biden issued an "Executive Order on Preventing and Combating Discrimination on the Basis of Gender Identity or Sexual Orientation." He referenced Title VII and Title IX.

In 2024, the U.S. Department of Education issued a new rule about how to enforce Title IX, and the state of Tennessee swiftly sued the Department of Education. While the U.S. district court was considering the case, it said that, "to prevent immediate harm to the plaintiffs," the Biden administration's new rule could not take effect yet.

On January 9, 2025, U.S. District court judge Danny C. Reeves struck down the Biden administration's expanded protections in response to the lawsuit filed by the states of Tennessee, Kentucky, Indiana, Ohio, Virginia, and West Virginia.

== Views of Trump's second administration ==
In Donald Trump's second term, the Department of Education reverted to 2020 regulations on protections based on gender identity under Title IX. On January 20, 2025, President Donald Trump issued Defending Women from Gender Ideology Extremism and Restoring Biological Truth to the Federal Government which, for the purposes of the federal government, defined a person's "sex" as the sex of said person at their conception and that this sex was fixed for a person's life. The order also rescinded Biden's executive orders 13988 and 14021 which defined a person's sex as their self assessed gender identity. In February, President Trump signed Executive Order 14201, directing the federal government to interpret Title IX rules as prohibiting transgender girls and women from female sports. In April, the Department of Justice and Department of Education launched the Title IX Special Investigations Team to streamline investigations into violations of policies prohibiting transgender women and girls from sports teams and restrooms, stating in a news release that the team would "protect students, and especially female athletes, from the pernicious effects of gender ideology in school programs and activities." The LGBTQ advocacy group GLAAD accused the initiative of wasting taxpayer resources and warned such bans "endanger all girls as they risk invasive genital exams and other expensive ‘verification.’"

== Litigation ==
Starting in 2010, OCR brought a number of successful enforcement actions under Title IX on behalf of students who were subject to harassment or discrimination on the basis of their gender identity, gender expression, or failure to conform to gender stereotypes. Eight of the cases were settled in favor of the students. Several private lawsuits were brought as well on similar grounds.

=== G. G. v. Gloucester County School Board ===
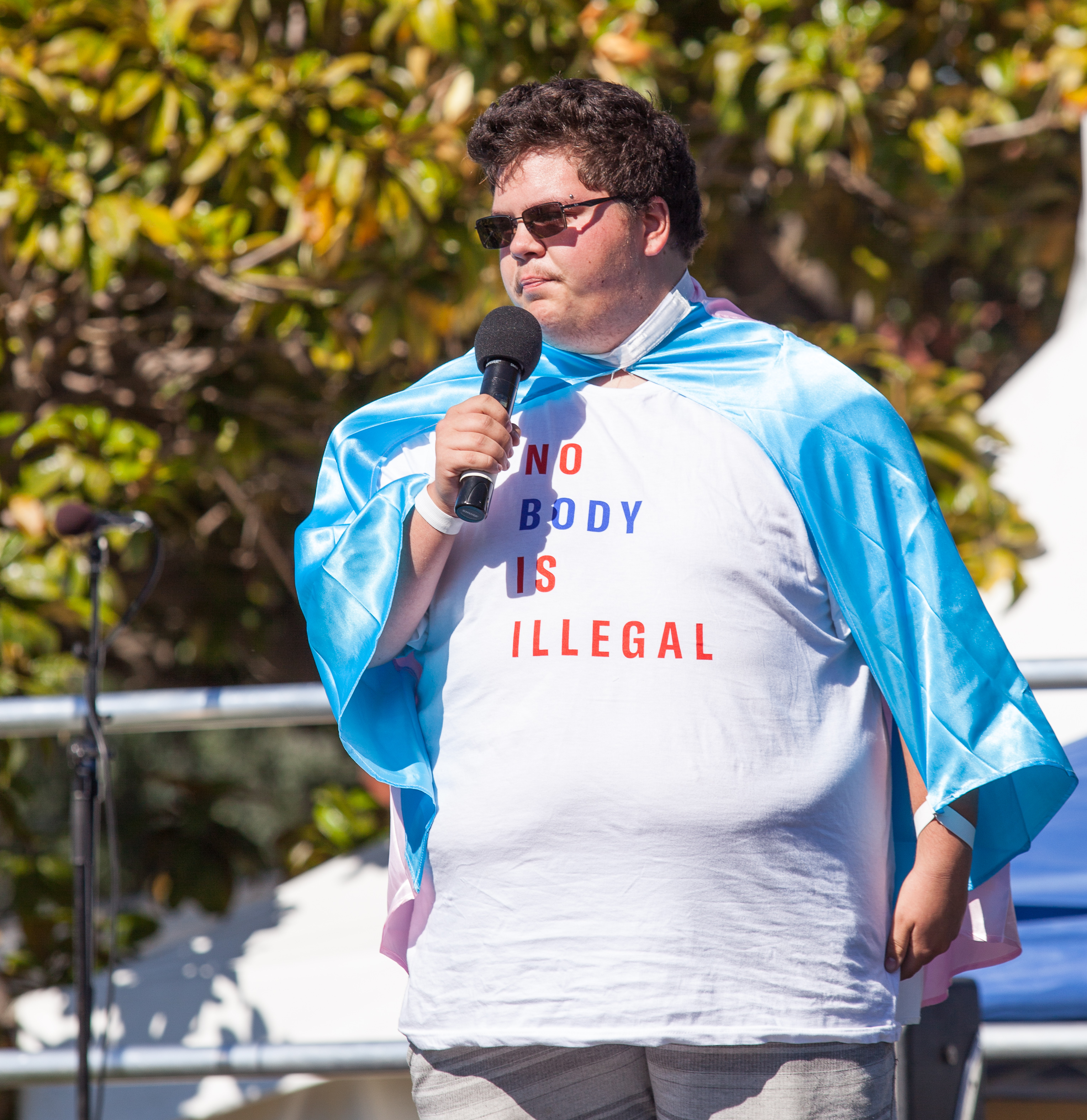
Gavin Grimm, wearing a trans pride flag cape and a T-shirt reading "No Body Is Illegal", speaks on stage at the 2018 Trans March San Francisco.

In 2016, the Fourth Circuit became the first Court of Appeals to rule on the scope of Title IX as applied to transgender students, in the case of Virginia high school student Gavin Grimm. Grimm came out as a transgender boy while at Gloucester High School in Virginia. His use of the boys' bathrooms upset some of the students and parents, prompting the Gloucester County School Board to pass a resolution requiring students to use restrooms of their biological sex or of unisex bathrooms they subsequently created at the high school. Grimm refused to use these and ended up using the school nurse's bathroom.

Grimm, with help of the ACLU and the DOJ, sued the school board on discrimination on the basis of his sex. Though the case was initially dismissed by the United States District Court for the Eastern District of Virginia, the Fourth Circuit overturned the ruling and remanded the case, asserting the District Court failed to consider the DOE and OCR's "controlling weight" of Title IX interpretation based on Chevron U.S.A., Inc. v. Natural Resources Defense Council, Inc. and Auer v. Robbins deference. The District Court found for Grimm and issued a preliminary injunction against the school board in June 2016. The board petitioned to the Supreme Court which had certified the case prior to the election of Donald Trump. After Trump took office, the Trump administration reversed several of the prior positions of the Obama administration, including the DOE/OCR's stance on transgender status under Title IX, and informed this to the Supreme Court. The Supreme Court subsequently vacated the injunction due to the Trump administration's now-controlling policy.

The district court case continued, and in August 2019, ruled in Grimm's favor in summary judgement. Grimm was awarded attorney's fees, court expenses, and a nominal $1 in damages, and the court issued a permanent injunction requiring the school board to update Grimm's official school records to reflect his gender identity. The school board appealed to the Fourth Circuit, during which the Supreme Court ruled in Bostock v. Clayton County that discrimination against "sex" in Title VII of the Civil Rights Act includes both sexual orientation and gender identity. The Fourth Circuit used the Bostock ruling to uphold the District Court's ruling for Grimm that the school board's bathroom policy was discriminatory. The Supreme Court declined to certify the school board's petition to this decision, and the school board ultimately settled with Grimm for $1.3 million by August 2021.

=== Whitaker v. Kenosha Unified School District ===
In July 2016, Ash Whitaker, a transgender boy, filed suit against the Kenosha Unified School District in Wisconsin because the district denied him access to the boys' restrooms in violation of Title IX and the Equal Protection Clause of the U.S. Constitution. In September 2016, a federal district court decided that the school district must let him use the boys' restroom. The school district appealed, and a three-judge panel of the Seventh Circuit Court of Appeals unanimously ruled in the student's favor, finding that "a policy that requires an individual to use a bathroom that does not conform with his or her gender identity punishes that individual for his or her gender non‐conformance, which in turn violates Title IX."

=== North Carolina's Public Facilities Privacy & Security Act (HB2) ===
On March 23, 2016, North Carolina enacted the Public Facilities Privacy & Security Act. Among the provisions of the Act is a requirement on North Carolina schools to prohibit transgender students from using bathroom and changing facilities corresponding to their gender identity. On May 4, 2016, the federal government notified Gov. Pat McCrory, the North Carolina Department of Public Safety, and the University of North Carolina (UNC) system that the Act violates Title IX (inter alia), and asked North Carolina not to implement it. Failure to comply could result in the loss of billions of dollars in federal funding to the state, including $1.4 billion for the UNC system and $800 million for federally backed student loans.

On May 9, 2016, North Carolina and the federal government filed suits against each other. McCrory filed one lawsuit and Senate leader Phil Berger and House Speaker Tim Moore filed a second lawsuit against the United States, both in the Eastern District of North Carolina (assigned to Judge Terrence Boyle), seeking declaratory judgment that the Act was not discriminatory. The DOJ filed suit against North Carolina in the Middle District of North Carolina (assigned to Judge Thomas D. Schroeder), asking the court to stop the state from discriminating against transgender people based, in part, on Title IX. Attorney General Loretta Lynch described the lawsuit:

This action is about a great deal more than just bathrooms[.] This is about the dignity and respect we accord our fellow citizens, and the laws that we, as a people and as a country, have enacted to protect them – indeed, to protect all of us. It's about the founding ideals that have led this country – haltingly but inexorably – in the direction of fairness, inclusion, and equality for all Americans. This is not a time to act out of fear. This is a time to summon our national virtues of inclusivity, diversity, compassion, and open-mindedness. What we must not do – what we must never do – is turn on our neighbors, our family members, our fellow Americans, for something they cannot control, and deny what makes them human.

=== Texas v. United States ===
On May 25, 2016, eleven states sued to the federal government in the Northern District of Texas in at attempt to overturn the Dear Colleague letter and other administration efforts to protect transgender students under Title IX. Joining lead plaintiff Texas were the states of Alabama, Arizona, Georgia, Louisiana, Maine, Oklahoma, Tennessee, Utah, West Virginia and Wisconsin. In their complaint, the plaintiff states alleged that by "rewriting" Title IX to cover discrimination on the basis of gender identity, the federal government had "conspired to turn ... educational settings across the country into laboratories for a massive social experiment, flouting the democratic process, and running roughshod over commonsense policies protecting children and basic privacy rights." The case was assigned to Judge Reed Charles O'Connor.

After the suit was filed and before any court action, Texas Lt. Gov. Dan Patrick urged schools to ignore the federal government's Title IX guidance and refuse to allow transgender students to use the facilities consistent with their gender identity.

Mississippi and Kentucky have joined the original plaintiffs in the litigation, and Kansas is considering joining as well.

On March 3, 2017, Texas was withdrawn by the plaintiff states in light of the recission by the Education and Justice Departments of guidance letters.

=== Dallas High School parents v. Dallas School District ===
A transgender boy by the name of Elliot Yoder sparked controversy in the Dallas School District starting in November 2015 by being allowed to use the boys locker room at Dallas High School. The topic of debate centered around interpretations of the Title IX Education Amendments of 1972, and whether transgender students fall under its protection.

In 2015 freshman Elliot Yoder asked the administration to use the boys locker room to change for his PE class. His reason for asking was up until that point he used a unisex restroom to change before PE. However, the restroom was not close to the gym, and Yoder described it as a "walk of shame." School district lawyers reached out to Dallas High School administrators informing them that recent interpretations of Title IX provide against discrimination of transgender students. Before allowing Yoder to use the boy's locker room, the school distributed letters to the male students that would share the locker room with Yoder informing them and their parents of the situation. The boys shared photos of the letter on their social media. The next School Board meeting was full of Dallas High School parents determined to change the administration's decision. Many parents voiced their worry regarding their children's safety and privacy. One resident read a Facebook comment from a city council member that threatened to physically harm any student that tries to use the locker room that doesn't align with their biological sex. The School Board defended itself by stating that not allowing Yoder to use the boy's locker room could violate state or federal law and they would lose their funding. Dallas School District never repealed their decision to allow Yoder to use the boy's facilities.

After unsuccessfully trying to exclude transgender students from using the facilities that match their gender identity, Dallas High School parents filed a lawsuit against the Dallas School District. The parents were part of The Parents' Rights in Education group (PRIE). The parents claimed that allowing transgender students to use the locker room caused shame, humiliation, and anxiety among the community. During the hearing in Portland, Oregon, Herb Gray, a district attorney, claimed that the other students civil rights were being violated by forcing them to undress in front of someone of the opposite biological sex. The judge presiding over this case had a 56-page ruling that stated that, "high school students do not have a fundamental privacy right to not share school restrooms, lockers, and showers with transgender students whose biological sex is different than theirs." In the end, the judge dismissed the lawsuit, and the Ninth Circuit Court of Appeals (2018) agreed with the decision.

=== Doe v. Boyertown Area School District ===
The Boyertown, Pennsylvania school district implemented a policy in 2016 to comply with the Obama administration's guidance, allowing transgender students to use either restroom as they saw fit. Several non-transgender students, including an unidentified "John Doe", at the school felt that this policy violated their rights, and through the Alliance Defending Freedom, sued the district to reverse the policy. While previous cases (like those above) have found for schools to have such transgender restroom policies to support the rights of transgender individuals under Title IX, this suit specifically focused on the infringement of the rights of others. The District Court refused to grant an injunction to block the policy, and when the Alliance appealed to the Third Circuit, the three-judge panel ruled from the bench that Boyertown's policy was constitutional. In May 2019, the Supreme Court of the United States declined to accept the petition to challenge the federal court ruling, leaving the bathroom policy allowance in place.

=== Hecox v. Little ===
In March 2020, Idaho Governor Brad Little signed into law the "Fairness in Women's Sports Act", also known as House Bill 500. This legislation, the first of its kind in the United States, prohibits trans women athletes from competing in female-only sports. In April 2020, the ACLU and the Legal Voice filed a lawsuit, Hecox v. Little, arguing that this law violates the US Constitution and Title IX.

=== Adams v. The School Board of St. Johns County, Florida ===
In December 2022, sitting en banc, the United States Court of Appeals for the Eleventh Circuit ruled that separating the use of male and female bathrooms in the public schools based on a student's biological sex doesn't violate the Equal Protection Clause of the Fourteenth Amendment or Title IX of the Education Amendments Act of 1972. Previously, in August 2020, a three judge panel of the United States Court of Appeals for the Eleventh Circuit affirmed a 2018 lower court ruling in Adams v. The School Board of St. Johns County, Florida that discrimination on the basis of gender identity is discrimination "on the basis of sex" and is prohibited under Title IX (federal civil rights law) and the Equal Protection Clause of the 14th Amendment to the US Constitution.

=== Cooper v. USA Powerlifting ===
On February 27, 2023, while ruling that Minnesota state law requires that a trans woman be allowed to compete as a female in powerlifting competitions, a Minnesota state court found that

federal civil rights laws such as Title VII and Title IX prohibit discrimination "on the basis of sex," but, unlike the MHRA, do not explicitly prohibit discrimination on the basis of sexual orientation . . . Nonetheless, courts interpreting Title VII and Title IX have found policies relating to transgender persons discriminate "on the basis of sex" because the "discriminator is necessarily referring to the individual’s sex to determine incongruence between [self-identified] sex and gender."

=== United States v. California Interscholastic Federation ===
On July 9, 2025, the Trump administration sued the state of California for allowing trans girls to compete in girls' school sports, claiming that this policy violates Title IX protections. The lawsuit was filed after the California Department of Education and the California Interscholastic Federation refused to comply with a federal directive to change their policies of including trans athletes and to issue apologies to athletes who lost to trans female competitors.

== Religious exemptions from Title IX ==
If an educational institution is able to prove to the Department of Education that any provision of Title IX conflicts with a certain religious tenet of the organization, the department grants an exemption. The educational institution is thus able to continue gender-based discrimination while receiving federal funding — as long as the institution's actions do not violate any other legislation. For LGBTQ+ students, Title IX is the only legislation that has been interpreted to protect them from discrimination in their educational institution, so a religious exemption from Title IX leaves them undefended.

The religious exemption was based on the precedent of Representative Graham Purcell of Texas's amendment to JFK's 1964 Civil Rights Act, which allows religious educational institutions to discriminate in their hiring practices.

As of March 2019, 277 educational institutions are religiously exempt from Title IX.

=== Cases of discrimination against LGBTQ+ students ===
In 2012, the private Christian Grace University expelled Danielle Powell for her lesbian relationship. Grace University, which had a religious exemption from Title IX, argued Powell brought the expulsion on herself, as she signed an agreement to obey all the university's community standards her first year. This justification solidly placed the responsibility upon all LGBTQ+ students to choose their educational institutions with full knowledge of their community standards and religious exemption status. Additionally, Grace University assumed all LGBTQ+ students would have already self-identified as queer, when Powell herself had not yet recognized her LGBTQ+ identity when signing the community standards.

In 2014, a trans male student at George Fox University requested to live in campus all-male housing. The private Quaker college first refused his request, and then applied for a religious exemption from Title IX through the Office of Civil Rights. Even though the discrimination technically violated Title IX since the university had not obtained the exemption at the time of refusing the student's request, the Office of Civil Rights still granted the exemption and treated the discrimination as allowed, citing a "presumed" exemption based on those of similar institutions.

In 2018, Christian Pennsylvania school Clark Summit University expelled Gary Campbell for violating their "sexual purity" policy. He was six credits away from graduation after taking personal leave, and Clark Summit University had not applied for religious exemption from Title IX.

== See also ==
- Transgender rights in the United States
- Transphobia in the United States
