= Gloucester High School (Virginia) =

Coordinates: 37°22′54.6″N 76°31′29.4″W

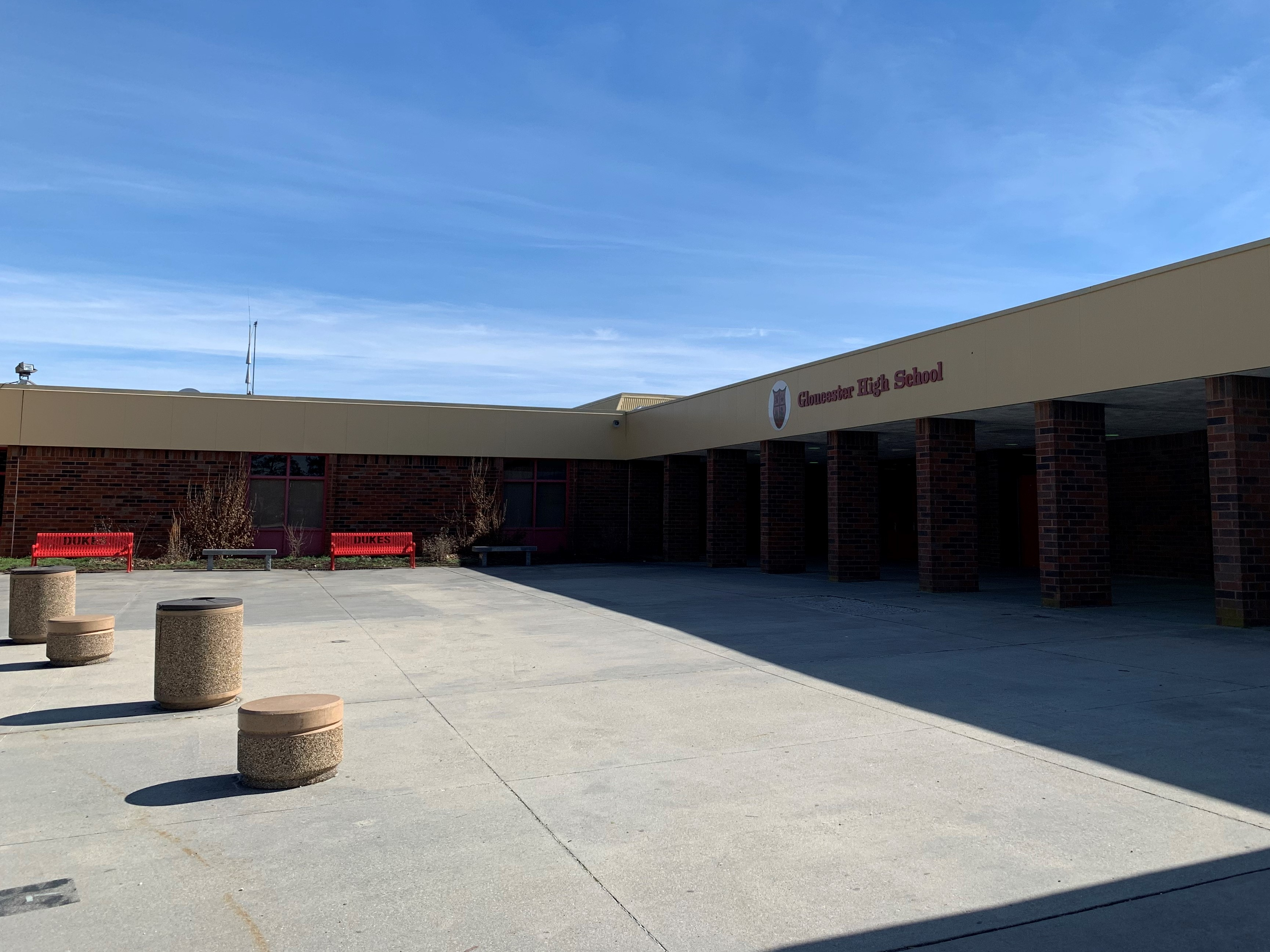

Location
- 6680 Short Lane; Gloucester, Virginia 23061; United States

Information
- School type: Public high school
- Founded: 1955, 1975 (in current building)
- School district: Gloucester County Public Schools
- Superintendent: Anthony Vladu
- Principal: Ade Brayboy
- Grades: 9-12
- Enrollment: 1,549 (2023-24)
- Language: English
- Campus: Rural
- Colors: Red, White and Gold
- Athletics conference: Virginia High School League; AAA Peninsula District; AAA Eastern Region
- Mascot: Dukes
- Website: https://ghs.gc.k12.va.us/

Gloucester High School is an accredited public high school located four miles from Gloucester Courthouse (the county seat) in Gloucester County, Virginia, United States. It is operated by Gloucester County Public Schools, a Virginia public school division.

The current complex was originally built in 1976, and has been expanded several times since. The current high school facility remains the only high school in the county, even though student numbers have risen steadily since its construction date. The current number of students ranges somewhere between 1,500 and 2,000.

== Renovations ==
A major addition was built onto the school in 1993 and functions mainly as the school's science wing. It is fully equipped with 3 computer labs, 2 full scale chemistry labs, as well as other classrooms with enough equipment for simple demonstrations. It is known to students and faculty as D-Hall. Included in the expansion was a foreign language hall at the opposite end of the building, built onto A-Hall.

Less extensive renovations have occurred since then, including the office and guidance offices in 2005. Beginning in April 2006, the industrial arts facilities were remodeled into new art rooms by the beginning of the following school year, freeing up the previous art rooms for normal classroom use. The old primary art room became the newsroom of the school newspaper, the Dukes' Dispatch. During the summer of 2006, the school's television production facility was updated with new equipment and made into a studio. The school then began producing programming for its own local Public-access television cable TV channel. The most recent renovations were completed in October 2006 and included a $700,000 renovation of the auditorium.

During the summer of 2007, Gloucester High began outfitting classrooms with LCD projectors. Most recently, another wing of the school began renovations to add a cardiovascular workout room. The room will include treadmills and other cardiovascular workout machines.

== Class structure ==
Gloucester High School operates on a four by four scheduling structure. The school day begins at 7:40 AM EDT and ends at 2:40 PM EDT. Every day there are four periods that are approximately two hours long, which host one class each period. With one school year containing two semesters, there are 4 classes each semester which total into 8 classes over the course of a year. The exception to this rule are Dual and AP classes which are every other day over the course of a year, with some activities classes also following this rule. There are three lunch blocks, each 25 minutes in length, which take place over the course of the day's third block.

== Facilities ==
The facilities of Gloucester High School include:

- Sports installations
  - American football stadium
  - Quarter mile track
  - Eight tennis courts
  - Two baseball fields
  - One soccer field
  - Weight Training building
  - Main gymnasium with pull-out bleachers and locker rooms
  - Auxiliary gymnasium
  - A large plot of land for multiple uses by gym classes
- Academic installations
  - Large auditorium (renovated 2006)
  - Fully equipped science laboratories
  - Nine computer labs, each with roughly 25 computers and a ceiling mounted LCD projector
  - A fully equipped, state-of-the-art library
  - A driver's education driving range
  - Television production lab
  - Greenhouse for horticultural classes
  - An auto-mechanics facility
  - A carpentry shop**
  - Complete restaurant kitchen facilities for the student-run International Café
- Other installations
  - Three cafeterias: a large open area known as The Commons, as well as two conventional cafeterias
  - Nurse facilities including an emergency defibrillator
  - 3D printer for architecture classes
  - Student parking lot

== Athletics ==
Gloucester High school is in the VHSL Region A Division 5 and plays in the Peninsula District of Virginia.

=== Fall athletics ===
- American football
- Marching Band and Colorguard
- Field hockey
- Cheerleading
- Boys/Girls Volleyball
- Boys/Girls Cross country
- Golf

=== Winter athletics ===
- Boys/Girls Basketball
- Boys/Girls Winter track
- Boys/Girls Swimming
- Gymnastics
- Wrestling

=== Spring athletics ===
- Boys/Girls Soccer
- Track and field
- Baseball
- Softball
- Boys/Girls Tennis
- Crew

== Theater ==
Gloucester High School has been recognized for its drama department. Every year the drama department, or Duke Troupe, compete in a regional theater competition and perform two public shows a year: a fall play and a spring musical. Past shows include South Pacific, Little Shop of Horrors, A Christmas Carol, Grease, Dracula, Footloose, Scheme of a Driftless Shifter, The Wizard of Oz, Anybody for Tea, Dolls, Fiddler on the Roof, Annie, Disney's High School Musical, and Disney's Beauty and the Beast. The performances are open for participation by any student at the school (not just those enrolled in theater classes).

== Culinary arts ==
Gloucester High School operates a fully functioning dining room called "Dukes Bistro". The culinary program places a heavy emphasis on French cuisine, as well as Gloucester County's historical significance in the seafood industry. The culinary program has competed on a state and national level, winning first place in Virginia in 2009 and 2011.

== Events ==
- Spirit Week is held the week of Homecoming and consists of themed days in which each class competes for the spirit stick. At the end of the week, students in each class dress in the school colors. Freshmen dress in black, sophomores in yellow, juniors in red, and seniors tie-dye their attire with red and yellow. There is a pep rally held in the gymnasium and the seniors run in the doors as a class. The Marching Dukes play a stand tune or two and the sports teams are recognized. Everyone gets very excited for the tailgate and game that happens that night. The Thursday of Homecoming week is when the Homecoming parade is held and different organizations are represented. On Saturday, the Homecoming Dance is held in the Commons and surrounding areas of the school and each year there is a different theme.
- Bands Along the Bay is a Marching Band competition hosted by the Gloucester Marching Dukes. The inaugural competition was held on October 12, 2019.
- Foreign Language Week is usually in March or April, when students and teachers celebrate foreign languages. Students create displays and, with teachers, organize a banquet to take place after school. The banquet, held in the Commons, consists of ethnic foods cooked and served by the school's culinary students. Language classes usually perform skits and songs for those in attendance.
- Junior Ring Dance is essentially junior prom. It is sponsored and run by the junior class, and it is during this dance that the juniors are presented with their class rings.
- Senior Prom
- Senior Graduation takes place every year in June.
- Military Ball takes place every year for NJROTC cadets and their dates.

== Notable faculty ==
- Jon Stewart of The Daily Show was the soccer coach at GHS while a student at The College of William and Mary, from which he graduated in 1984.

== Transgender policy dispute ==
At the beginning of the 2014–2015 school year, sophomore Gavin Grimm came out as a transgender boy and used a doctor's note to obtain permission to use male bathroom facilities at the school. After about two months, an anonymous complaint was received, and the Gloucester County School Board passed a policy resolution requiring that access to changing rooms and bathrooms "shall be limited to the corresponding biological genders, and students with gender identity issues shall be provided an alternative appropriate private facility". When he refused to use the girls' bathroom, the school hastily converted a few broom closets into unisex bathrooms and offered those as an alternative. He refused to use those, opting to use a bathroom in the school nurse's office instead.

Grimm then obtained legal representation from the American Civil Liberties Union and sued the school in federal court. The U.S. Department of Justice agreed to intervene in the case on Grimm's behalf, writing to the court that Title IX "prohibits discrimination based on sex, including gender identity, transgender status, and nonconformity to sex stereotypes". After various rulings and appeals, the dispute escalated to the U.S. Supreme Court, which announced in October 2016 that it would take up the case.
