= Oklahoma Senate Bill 615 =

Bathroom bill passed by the U.S. state of Oklahoma

Oklahoma Senate Bill 615 is a bathroom bill passed in May 2022 in the U.S. state of Oklahoma. It primarily targeted schools, but required all restrooms, changing rooms, and other multiple occupancy facilities involving nudity be segregated based on sex assigned at birth. The bill was opposed by human rights and LGBTQ advocacy groups and by Democratic officials, and was supported by conservatives, including Christian groups like the Alliance Defending Freedom. It was signed into law in May 2022 and came into effect immediately.

The law has been linked to the 2024 death of Nex Benedict. As of November 2025, it is being challenged in court by the ACLU, Lambda Legal, and others.

== Bill content ==
Bill 615 requires any "multiple occupancy restroom or changing area" in public schools or public charter schools in Oklahoma to be designated for the exclusive use of either the male or the female sex, as identified on the individual's original birth certificate. While the bill is characterized as a bathroom bill, it affects any areas "used by more than one individual at a time, where individuals may be in various stages of undress in the presence of other individuals." Potentially affected areas specified by the bill include restrooms, changing rooms, locker rooms, and shower rooms. Schools are required to provide single-occupancy stalls as a "reasonable accommodation" for individuals who do not want to comply with the policy, but non-complying individuals are also subject to disciplinary actions, which are set by each school board.

The Oklahoma State Department of Education is required to penalize noncompliant schools by decreasing their annual budgets by 5% for the following year. Noncompliant schools are also open to legal action from parents.

The bill also declares a state of emergency, effective immediately as of when the bill was signed into law.

== History ==
Bill 615 was passed amid the 2020s anti-LGBTQ movement in the United States, and was one of many bathroom bills passed during this period. Other bills restricting transgender rights had been proposed or brought to the Oklahoma Legislature since 2020, and advocates and parents of transgender children in Oklahoma became concerned that transgender youth were being targeted in the state and across the country.

Oklahoma Education Secretary Ryan Walters brought the issue to the Legislature in response to public outcry over a 2015 policy in Stillwater, Oklahoma, which allowed transgender students to use the bathroom that aligns with their gender identity. After discussions and conflicting public opinion, the Stillwater school board refused to revoke the policy, and Walters sent them a letter urging them to reverse their decision. The board then asked for the Oklahoma State Department of Education to provide clear rules to the districts.

The bill was passed by the 58th Oklahoma Legislature. Senator David Bullard sponsored it. The principal author was Danny Williams (Republican representative for Seminole County), and Kevin West (Republican representative for Moore County) was co-author. It was first introduced in February 2021, passed the Senate in March 2022, passed the House in April 2022, and Oklahoma Governor Kevin Stitt signed the bill into law on May 25, 2022.

== Responses ==
Emily Virgin, Democrat House Minority Leader, said that "The party of small government has become the party of intrusion. It's despicable." Democratic representative Mauree Turner, who is nonbinary, spoke against the bill when it was in the House, and said that "SB615 fosters an environment where children do not feel safe." Democratic representative Forrest Bennett said that "Senate Bill 615 hurts people. It hurts progress. It hurts Oklahoma.” Democrat House representative Monroe Nichols expressed concerns about the bill. According to Nichols, bills "like 615" hurt business in Oklahoma, in part by deterring companies that support LGBTQ rights from coming to the state. He also said,

Safety is clearly not the biggest concern when it comes to people in the restroom. This is targeting individuals who you don't like because they don't identify how you would like them to identify and you're offended by it and because you're offended you're going to put them in danger. That's just not right.

Freedom Oklahoma, an LGBTQ advocacy group in Oklahoma, released a statement against the bill. It said that LGBTQ youth were being "bullied by our lawmakers"; that the bill is "absolutely unconstitutional", "a violation of Title IX", and could create Title II violations; and that the "bill would demand schools act in opposition to legal standards and best practices to keep students safe, all for policy that a cabinet member is moving to shift political pressure away from questioning his personal ethics." The statement also warned that the bill would worsen "brain drain" in the state, cause transgender students to be "regularly outed at school", and would "very likely" cost "the lives of some of the most vulnerable children in our state whose ability to imagine a future for themselves is erased by political grandstanding that furthers misinformation, fear, and hate about who they are."

The Human Rights Campaign condemned the state politicians who passed the bill. Human Rights Watch said that the bill would "endanger transgender students’ health and undermine their rights to education and privacy" and "would further isolate and stigmatize transgender children who are already prone to bullying, rendering schools an unsafe and hostile environment."

Students at Norman High School and Norman North High School staged walkouts in protest of the bill and resulting suspension of a transgender student for using the restroom that corresponded with her identity. The student said, "It feels like we are living in a state that actively wants us to disappear." Another transgender student said, "Making transgender students use different restrooms is segregation and unconstitutional."

Oklahoma Attorney General John M. O'Connor released a statement to "applaud" the Oklahoma Legislature for passing the bill, along with Oklahoma House Bill 4327, which restricted access to abortion in the state. (Note: See also: Abortion in Oklahoma)

Alliance Defending Freedom, a conservative Christian legal advocacy group, released a statement in favor of the bill, saying that it "ensures that school policies respect the privacy rights of all children."

== Impact ==
In August 2022, the Oklahoma State Board of Education approved a set of rules as required by the new law.

In September 2022, the American Civil Liberties Union (ACLU), ACLU of Oklahoma, Lambda Legal, and Covington & Burling LLP filed a lawsuit, Bridge v. Oklahoma State Department of Education, challenging the new law on behalf of three transgender students and their families. The suit claimed that the law violates the Equal Protection Clause and Title IX. District Judge Jodi W. Dishman dismissed the case, but in 2024 the ACLU and the Attorneys General of 17 states appealed the decision to the Tenth Circuit Court of Appeals, which began considering the arguments in November 2025.

In February 2024, the Bridge v. Oklahoma State Department of Education legal team issued a statement linking the bill with the death of Nex Benedict, a non-binary teenager who died after being beaten in the toilets at their school. Various human rights and advocacy groups, including the ACLU, Lambda Legal, and the Autistic Women and Nonbinary Network, gave statements also linking Nex Benedict's death to the new bathroom law and condemning it as harmful to students.

== See also ==
- Arkansas House Bill 1570 (2021)
- Education in Oklahoma
- Florida Senate Bill 254 (2023)
- Harassment of transgender people in bathrooms
- Kansas SB 180
- LGBTQ rights in Oklahoma
- LGBTQ youth vulnerability
- List of LGBTQ rights organizations in Oklahoma
- North Carolina House Bill 142
- Outline of transgender topics
- Public Facilities Privacy & Security Act
- State bans on local anti-discrimination laws in the United States
- Transgender history in the United States
- Transgender rights in the United States
