= LGBTQ rights in Oklahoma =

- Oklahoma (USA)
- Legal status: Legal since 2003 (Lawrence v. Texas)
- Gender identity: Transgender people no longer allowed to change legal gender since 2021
- Restrictions: Non-binary birth certificates not allowed
- Discrimination protections: Protections in employment; further protections in Norman

Family rights
- Recognition of relationships: Same-sex marriage since 2014
- Adoption: Same-sex couples allowed to adopt

Lesbian, gay, bisexual, transgender, and queer (LGBTQ) people in the U.S. state of Oklahoma face legal challenges not experienced by non-LGBTQ residents. Same-sex sexual activity is legal in Oklahoma as a result of the U.S. Supreme Court decision in Lawrence v. Texas, although the state legislature has not repealed its sodomy laws. Both same-sex marriage and adoption by same-sex couples have been permitted since October 2014. State statutes do not prohibit discrimination based on sexual orientation or gender identity; however, the U.S. Supreme Court's ruling in Bostock v. Clayton County established that employment discrimination against LGBTQ people is illegal. This practice may still continue, however, as Oklahoma is an at-will employment state and it is still legal to fire an employee without requiring the employer to disclose any reason.

Amid the ongoing 2020s anti-LGBTQ movement in the United States, Oklahoma is considered an unfriendly state for LGBTQ people; in 2025, Out Leadership ranked Oklahoma as having the 44th least LGBTQ-friendly business climate.

== History and legality of same-sex sexual activity ==
Prior to European settlement, several Native American tribes inhabited the region. These peoples had perceptions towards gender and sexuality which differed significantly to that of the Western world. Tribes who were forcibly moved to Oklahoma also have/had such perceptions. Male-bodied individuals who act, behave and dress as women are known as haxu'xan among the Arapaho, he'émáné'e among the Cheyenne, kúsaat among the Pawnee people, and m'netokwe among the Potawatomi, whereas female-bodied individuals who act and live as male are referred to as hetanémáné'e among the Cheyenne. These individuals, nowadays also called "two-spirit", were traditionally regarded as supernatural and blessed by the spirits. In the Omaha-Ponca language, spoken by the Ponca and Omaha peoples, the term mix'uga refers to intersex or transgender people. Literally, the term means "instructed by the moon". Similar terms exist in the Chiwere language, historically spoken by the Missouria, Otoe and Iowa peoples, where it is mixo'ge, and in the now-extinct Kansa language where it is míⁿxoge.

Upon its creation in 1890, the Oklahoma Territory received Nebraska's criminal code and common law punishing sodomy ("crime against nature"), whether heterosexual or homosexual, with up to a year of imprisonment. The same year, the Oklahoma Territorial Legislature passed a law criminalizing sodomy with a potential sentence of up to 10 years imprisonment. The crime was complete upon penetration only. The law applied to consensual adults and married couples. The first recorded sodomy case occurred in 1917, when a judge ruled in Ex Parte DeFord that fellatio (oral sex) violated the sodomy statute. Likewise, in the 1935 case of Roberts v. State, the Oklahoma Court of Criminal Appeals held that cunnilingus was a violation of the law. In 1943, in LeFavour v. State, the same court rejected contentions that the sodomy law applied only to people of the same sex, confirming that it applied universally regardless of sex or sexual orientation.

One of the few court cases to deal with lesbian activity occurred in 1971, in Warner et al v. State. In this case, a married couple were convicted of forcing an Oklahoma City woman to engage in oral sex with each of them. The Court of Criminal Appeals specifically noted that lesbian activity was a violation of the sodomy statute. In 1973, the Court of Criminal Appeals, in Canfield v. State, voted 2–1 to uphold the conviction and sentence of 15 years in jail of Kenneth Canfield for consensual sodomy. The court rejected arguments that the law was an unconstitutional invasion of privacy. In Post v. State (1986), the court ruled that the sodomy law could not be applied to private, consensual adult heterosexual activity. The court did not address homosexual activity in its ruling. In 1990, the court ruled in Virgin v. State that the insertion of a single finger into the rectum did not constitute penetration.

In 1997, the Oklahoma Legislature revised parts of the sodomy statute, reducing the penalty to 2 years' imprisonment, a fine of 1,000 U.S. dollars or both. The law was short-lived; in 1999, a new law made same-sex sodomy punishable by up to 20 years in prison.

Same-sex sexual activity has been legal in Oklahoma since 2003, when the United States Supreme Court struck down all state sodomy laws with its ruling in Lawrence v. Texas.

== Recognition of same-sex relationships ==
In April 2004, the Oklahoma Senate, by a vote of 38 to 7, and the Oklahoma House of Representatives, by a vote of 92 to 4, approved a state-level constitutional ban on same-sex marriage. On November 2, 2004, Oklahoma voters approved Oklahoma Question 711, a constitutional amendment which banned same-sex marriage and any "legal incidents thereof be conferred upon unmarried couples or groups". On January 14, 2014, Judge Terence C. Kern, of the United States District Court for the Northern District of Oklahoma, declared Question 711 unconstitutional. The case, Bishop v. United States (formerly Bishop v. Oklahoma), was stayed pending appeal. A 3-judge panel of the Tenth Circuit heard oral arguments in Bishop on April 17, 2014, and upheld the district court's decision on July 18.

On October 6, 2014, the United States Supreme Court turned down Oklahoma's appeal which reinstates the district court's ruling that the state's ban on same-sex marriage is unconstitutional. Following the court's rejection of the appeal, the Oklahoma County Court Clerk's Office and others across the state started issuing marriage licenses to same-sex couples.

== Adoption and parenting ==
=== Adoption ===
Oklahoma permits adoption by a couple or an unmarried adult without regard to sexual orientation.

In August 2007, years before Oklahoma began allowing same-sex marriage, the Tenth Circuit Court of Appeals in the case of Finstuen v. Crutcher ordered Oklahoma to recognize an adoption by a same-sex couple. The child had been born in Oklahoma, and the parents had been married elsewhere. The court ordered Oklahoma to issue a revised birth certificate showing both adoptive parents.

Oklahoma law allows adoption agencies to choose not to place children in certain homes if it "would violate the agency's written religious or moral convictions or policies."

=== Fertility treatments ===
Lesbian couples can access fertility treatments and in vitro fertilization. Officially, when a child is born via donor insemination and the parents are married, state law recognizes the non-genetic, non-gestational mother as a legal parent. However, in 2023, an Oklahoma district judge gave parental rights to a sperm donor and took away those rights from the woman's ex-spouse. The mother's wife had not been mentioned in the contract with the sperm donor, and she had not adopted the child. However, she had been married to the mother at the time of the child's birth, and she had been listed on the birth certificate.

While there are no specific surrogacy laws in Oklahoma, courts recognize the legal validity of surrogacy contracts (gestational or traditional), without regard to the partners' genders. A traditional contract may increase the risk of legal conflict or litigation.

== Discrimination protections ==
Map of Oklahoma cities that had sexual orientation and/or gender identity anti–employment discrimination ordinances prior to Bostock Sexual orientation and gender identity in both public and private employment Sexual orientation in public employment Does not protect sexual orientation and gender identity in employment

Oklahoma statutes do not address discrimination based on gender identity or sexual orientation.

The city of Norman has a nondiscrimination policy that prohibits discrimination in employment, housing, and public accommodations on the basis of sexual orientation and gender identity, while the cities of Edmond, Oklahoma City and Tulsa have nondiscrimination policies that prohibit discrimination in public employment (i.e. city employees only) on account of sexual orientation.

=== Bostock v. Clayton County ===
On June 15, 2020, the U.S. Supreme Court ruled in Bostock v. Clayton County, consolidated with Altitude Express, Inc. v. Zarda, and R.G. & G.R. Harris Funeral Homes Inc. v. Equal Employment Opportunity Commission that discrimination in the workplace on the basis of sexual orientation or gender identity is discrimination on the basis of sex, and Title VII therefore protects LGBTQ employees from discrimination.

== Conversion therapy ==
In Norman, conversion therapy has been banned since July 2021, making it the first city within Oklahoma to ban conversion therapy.

At the end of the 2026 Oklahoma legislative session, Senate Bill 904 was passed with a vote of 77 in favor and 14 against in the House, and 39 in favor and 8 against in the Senate. The bill was approved by Governor Kevin Stitt on May 12, 2026. This bill restricts the use of state resources for gender-affirming medical care for minors and adults.

== Hate crime law ==
State law does not address hate crimes based on gender identity or sexual orientation. However, since the Matthew Shepard and James Byrd Jr. Hate Crimes Prevention Act was signed into law in October 2009, federal law has provided additional penalties for crimes motivated by the victim's actual or perceived sexual orientation or gender identity. Hate crimes against LGBTQ people can be prosecuted in federal court.

== Transgender rights ==
Transgender rights within Oklahoma remained mostly unaddressed until Kevin Stitt was elected as governor of Oklahoma. Since taking office in 2019, he has consistently acted against transgender rights.

=== Definition of legal sex ===
In August 2023, Stitt signed into law an executive order "explicitly defin[ing] male and female as biological sexes assigned at birth". This applies for all state and legal purposes, including using bathrooms and changing rooms in state-owned facilities, playing sports, living in domestic violence shelters, receiving assistance from rape crisis centers, incarceration, and the collection of statistics.

=== Identity documents ===
Previously, the Office of Vital Records altered the marker on the birth certificate of a transgender person upon receipt of a court order. Transgender Oklahomans could also change the gender marker on a driver's license by submitting to the Department of Public Safety a notarized statement from a physician confirming that they had undergone "permanent and irreversible" transition.

In October 2021, Oklahoma became the 14th US state to allow a "non-binary option" on a birth certificate by a court order resulting from Kit Vivien Loreleid v. Oklahoma State Department of Health.

In November 2021, Governor Stitt signed an executive order which blocked the Oklahoma State Department of Health from issuing any change to the gender marker on a birth certificate.

In April 2022, the Oklahoma Legislature passed Senate Bill 1100 to only allow sex markers of either male or female explicitly listed on birth certificates issued within Oklahoma and also legally ban “any other sex markers”. The Governor of Oklahoma signed the bill into law, effective immediately with an "emergency clause".

Oklahoma is also subject to federal law–which, since Executive Order 14168 was issued in January 2025, defines sex as an immutable male–female binary, with a person's sex being determined "at conception".

In October 2026, the Oklahoma Supreme Court issued a ruling retroactively dictating that it was never legal for a person to have their birth certificate's gender marker changed - even in the case of cisgender people whose birth certificate had simply been erroneously written.

=== Sports ===
In March 2022, Oklahoma Governor Stitt signed a bill that passed the Oklahoma Legislature preventing transgender women and girls from competing on women and girls' athletic teams at public schools and universities.

=== Bathroom bill ===
In May 2022, Stitt signed Oklahoma Senate Bill 615, a bathroom bill designed to prevent transgender students and staff from using the school bathrooms, changing rooms, and similar facilities that align with their gender identity, instead requiring them to use the facility that corresponds to the sex assigned to them at birth, per the student's original birth certificate. The bill has been linked to the death of Nex Benedict, a 16-year-old non-binary student in Oklahoma who died in 2024, shortly after they were beaten in their school's bathroom.

=== Healthcare ===
In October 2022, Stitt signed a bill into law that passed the Oklahoma Legislature will legally ban any government funding of Oklahoma hospitals - that provide any "gender transition services" to minors (similar to banning government funding abortions within Oklahoma hospitals since 1997).

In April 2023, a bill passed the Oklahoma Legislature that explicitly legally bans any gender-affirming healthcare practices on minors. Governor Stitt signed the bill into law in May 2023, making Oklahoma the 16th state to restrict such care for minors. In October 2023, a judge declined to stop it from taking effect.

In February 2023, the Oklahoma House passed a bill to ban any entity which receives public funding from providing or allowing its members to provide gender-affirming healthcare to a transgender person of any age, and to ban insurance providers from covering it, while altogether banning such care for minors. However, this bill was not voted upon by the Senate during the 2023 legislative session, and thus did not become law.

=== Living conditions ===
In 2018, a local school in Achille had to shut down for a few days due to safety concerns after a 12-year-old transgender student received death threats and threats of mutilation, whipping and castration by her classmates' parents.

== Freedom of expression ==
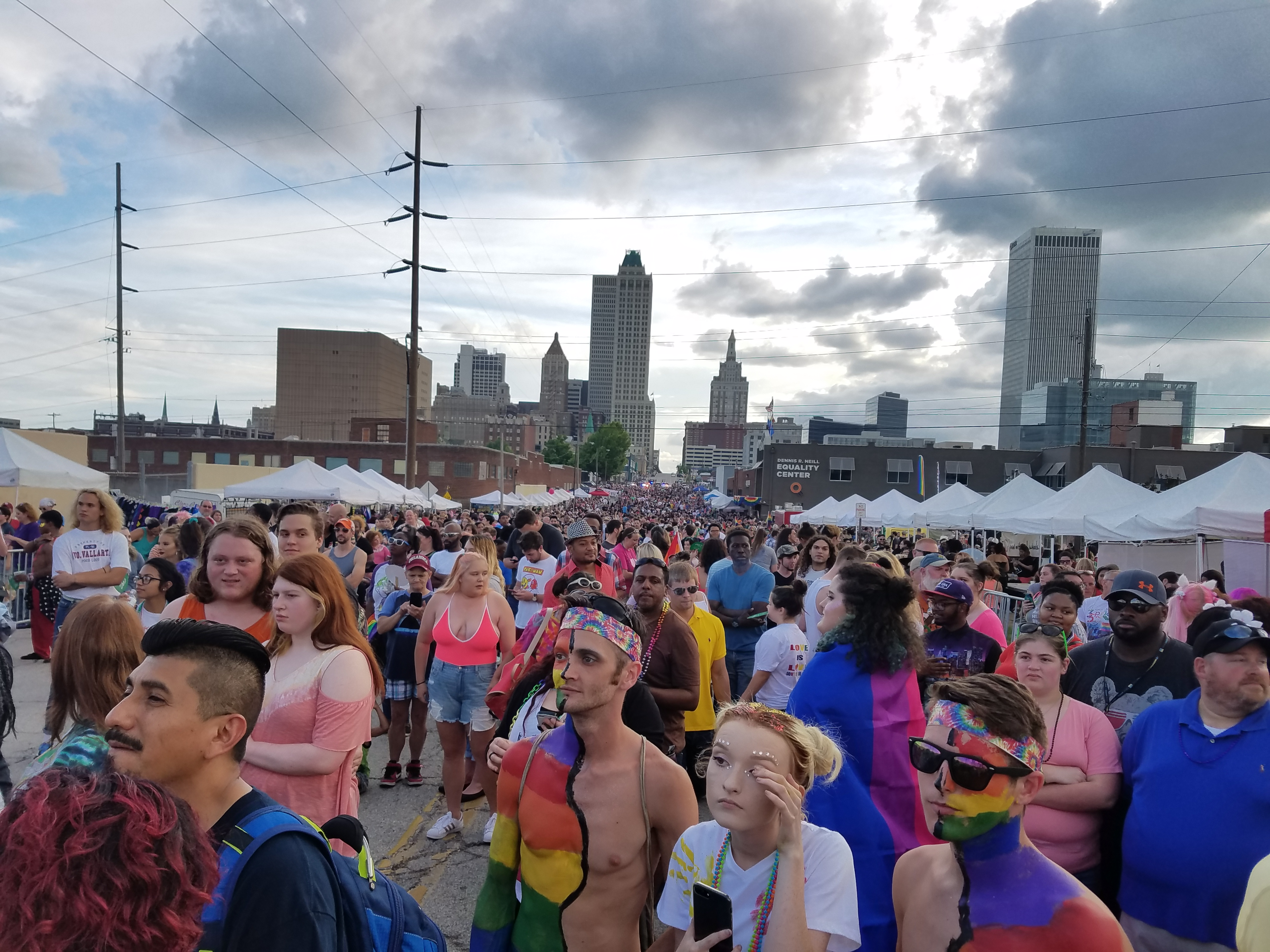
Tulsa Pride 2017

=== No promo homo law ===
Oklahoma has a "no promo homo law" in place that forbids the "promotion of homosexuality" in schools and instructs HIV-related education to teach students that not "engaging in homosexual activity" prevents the spread of the HIV virus.

=== Diversity training ban ===
In April 2021, the Oklahoma Legislature passed a bill legally banning any diversity training. Governor Kevin Stitt signed the bill into law, and it immediately came into effect.

=== Public universities ===
In late 2021, state Senator Rob Standridge introduced a bill (SB 1141) that would permit students in public universities to avoid any courses “addressing any form of gender, sexual, or racial diversity, equality, or inclusion curriculum” (as described by the Oklahoma Senate's press release) unless the course is required for their major. Standridge claimed that schools are "trying to indoctrinate students".

== National Guard ==
Legislation to institute in the Oklahoma National Guard (ONG) a local version of "Don't ask, don't tell" (DADT), the federal policy that formerly prohibited gays, lesbians and bisexuals from serving openly in the U.S. military, was proposed in January 2012 and withdrawn in February.

Following the U.S. Supreme Court decision in United States v. Windsor in June 2013 invalidating Section 3 of the Defense of Marriage Act, the U.S. Department of Defense (DoD) issued directives requiring state units of the National Guard to enroll the same-sex spouses of guard members in federal benefit programs. Guard officials in Oklahoma enrolled some same-sex couples until September 5, 2013, when Governor Fallin ordered an end to the practice. Defense Secretary Chuck Hagel on October 31 said he would insist on compliance. On November 6, Fallin announced that members of the Oklahoma National Guard could apply for benefits for same-sex partners at federally owned ONG facilities, where most staffers are federal employees, and at federal military installations. When DoD officials objected to that plan, Fallin ordered that all married couples, opposite-sex or same-sex, would be required to have benefits requests processed at those facilities.

== Public opinion ==
A 2022 Public Religion Research Institute (PRRI) poll found that 54% of Oklahomans supported same-sex marriage, while 44% were opposed, and 2% were undecided. Additionally, 65% supported an anti-discrimination law covering sexual orientation and gender identity, while 30% were against this. The PRRI also found that 40% opposed allowing public businesses to refuse to serve LGBTQ people due to religious beliefs, while 50% supported such religiously based refusals.

Public opinion for LGBTQ anti-discrimination laws in Oklahoma
Poll source	Date(s) administered	Sample size	Margin of error	% support	% opposition	% no opinion
Public Religion Research Institute	January 2-December 30, 2019	573	?	63%	27%	10%
Public Religion Research Institute	January 3-December 30, 2018	652	?	62%	29%	9%
Public Religion Research Institute	April 5-December 23, 2017	794	?	64%	25%	11%
Public Religion Research Institute	April 29, 2015-January 7, 2016	1,038	?	60%	36%	4%

== Summary table ==
Same-sex sexual activity legal	Yes (Since 2003; not yet codified)
Equal age of consent	Yes
Anti-discrimination laws for sexual orientation	No / Yes (In employment since 2020, not in housing nor public accommodations) (Note: The city of Norman provides further protections, including in housing and public accommodations.)
Anti-discrimination laws for gender identity	No / Yes (In employment since 2020, not in housing nor public accommodations)
Same-sex marriages	Yes / No (Since 2014, but explicitly banned in several Native American reservations) (Note: Explicit ban on same-sex marriage in the following tribes and reservations: Muscogee Nation since 2001. Iowa Tribe since 2004. Choctaw Nation since 2012. Seminole Nation since 2016. Citizen Potawatomi Nation since unknown.)
Stepchild and joint adoption by same-sex couples	Yes (Since 2014)
Lesbian, gay and bisexual people allowed to serve openly in the military	Yes (Since 2011)
Transgender people allowed to serve openly in the military	No (Banned since 2025)
Intersex people allowed to serve openly in the military	(Current DoD policy bans "hermaphrodites" from serving or enlisting in the military)
Conversion therapy banned on minors	No / Yes (Norman city only)
Right to change legal gender and a non-binary option on documents (e.g. on birth certificates and driving licences)	No
Access to IVF for lesbian couples	Yes
Surrogacy arrangements legal for gay male couples	Yes
MSMs allowed to donate blood	Yes / No (Since 2020; 3-month deferral period)

== See also ==
- 2020s anti-LGBTQ movement in the United States
- Anita Bryant
- Cimarron Alliance Foundation
- Federal preemption
- LGBTQ rights in the United States
- National Gay Task Force v. Board of Education
- Opposition to LGBTQ rights
