= Death of Nex Benedict =

2024 death of a nonbinary American teenager

Nex Benedict
- Benedict in 2023
- Born: January 11, 2008; El Paso, Texas, U.S.
- Died: February 8, 2024 (aged 16); Owasso, Oklahoma, U.S.
- Cause of death: Suicide by overdose

Nex Benedict (January 11, 2008 – February 8, 2024) was a 16-year-old non-binary American high school student who died the day after a physical altercation in the girls' restroom of their (Note: Benedict used he/him and they/them pronouns. This article uses they/them pronouns for consistency.) high school. Investigators later determined Benedict's death was a suicide caused by an overdose of Prozac and Benadryl. The incident was the subject of national media attention as some have argued Benedict's death was the result of anti-LGBTQIA policies in Benedict's home state of Oklahoma.

According to Benedict's mother and friends, Benedict had been bullied by classmates about their gender identity for more than a year before their death. On February 7, 2024, Benedict was involved in a fight in the girls' restroom at Owasso High School, during which they lost consciousness. The following day, Benedict collapsed in their living room and was later pronounced dead.

In late February, Benedict's death began to receive widespread news coverage and vigils in honor of Benedict were held across the United States. Civil rights groups and advocates condemned anti-LGBTQ policies and rhetoric, and called for an investigation of the Oklahoma State Department of Education, as well as the removal of Ryan Walters, the Oklahoma Superintendent of Public Instruction. Walters defended state policies and criticized responses to Benedict's death as politically motivated.

On March 13, a summary autopsy report by the Oklahoma medical examiner ruled Benedict's death a suicide caused by a drug overdose. On March 14, family members of Benedict released a statement about how they did not want the finding of suicide to overshadow the severity of Benedict's injuries from the altercation.

On March 21, Tulsa County District Attorney Steve Kunzweiler deemed the bathroom altercation to be mutual combat and announced no criminal charges would be filed in connection with the altercation or Benedict's death. In response, advocacy groups called for an independent investigation. On March 27, the Oklahoma medical examiner released a full autopsy report restating the finding of suicide by drug overdose.

== Background ==
Nex Benedict was born in 2008 in El Paso, Texas. According to Sue Benedict, Nex's grandmother and adoptive mother, Nex's biological father relinquished all parental rights early on, and is in prison for abuse. Sue raised Nex since they were two months old and formally adopted them a few years before their death. Sue is enrolled in the Choctaw Nation of Oklahoma, but Nex was not affiliated with the tribe. Nex and their family lived in Owasso, Oklahoma, a suburb of Tulsa, on the Cherokee Nation reservation, and attended school at Owasso High School on the reservation. The high school has 3,000 students in grades 9 through 12.

In 2022, Oklahoma became the first state in the United States to prohibit the use of non-binary gender markers on birth certificates, in Oklahoma Senate Bill 1100. A law passed in 2022, Oklahoma Senate Bill 615, prohibits students from using a bathroom that does not correspond with their sex assigned at birth, and minors are legally prevented from receiving gender-affirming health care. Legislation under consideration for the 2024 session included new curriculum for public schools to describe gender as an "immutable biological trait," a ban on changing sex on birth certificates, and a requirement for school employees to use pronouns and names for students based only on birth certificates.

Ryan Walters, the Oklahoma Superintendent of Public Instruction, has implemented policies that include preventing students from changing the designation of their gender or sex in school records. In January 2024, Walters appointed social media influencer Chaya Raichik, the operator of the Libs of TikTok account, known for posting anti-LGBTQ+ content, to the Oklahoma Department of Education's Library Media Advisory Committee. In 2022, a middle school teacher, reported to have been "greatly admired" by Nex, resigned after becoming a subject of a post by Raichik.

According to Sue Benedict and Nex's friends, students at Owasso High School had been bullying Nex due to their gender identity for more than a year since the beginning of the 2023 school year. Benedict was a sophomore in high school.

== Altercation ==
On the afternoon of February 7, 2024, surveillance footage from the Owasso High School hallway showed six students enter the girls' bathroom where the incident occurred, before Nex and two students entered. In a subsequent interview with police, Nex told an officer that while they and their friend were in the restroom, Nex heard laughter and comments about Nex and their friend, from the group of three students they had previously complained to their mother about. Nex said they poured water on the group of three students, and then "They came at me. They grabbed on my hair. I grabbed onto them. I threw one of them into a paper towel dispenser and then they got my legs out from under me and got me on the ground." Nex said they were then beaten by the students and lost consciousness.

Nex told the officer they did not know the names of the three students and said the group had antagonized them for days before the altercation. Nex said they had only known the students through an in-school suspension they were all serving, and Nex said the group were all first-year students.

Sue Benedict said she was contacted by Owasso High School and arrived to find Nex with bruises on their face and scratches on the back of their head. Sue was also informed that Nex was suspended from school for two weeks. Sue then took Nex to be examined at a nearby hospital and summoned the Owasso Police Department.

Sue told the officer about past complaints by Nex about three students in the week before the altercation, and that Nex had described the conduct as "they're making comments, they're throwing stuff, they're calling us names," and Sue told Nex to ignore the students. During the interview, the officer asked Nex why they had not reported the past conduct of the three students to the school, and Nex replied "I didn't really see the point in it."

The officer indicated it was possible the incident might be seen as mutual and Nex could face charges if Sue pursued charges against the three students, also stating that the other students had no right to put their hands on Nex. Sue declined to pursue charges at that time. The officer also said he could be contacted to reconsider filing charges, if after Nex was examined, their injuries were more severe than scrapes and bruises. Nex was discharged later that day and reportedly went to sleep with a sore head.

== Death ==
On February 8, the day after the altercation, while preparing to travel with their mother for an appointment, Nex collapsed in the family's living room. Sue called 911, saying that Nex's eyes had rolled back and Nex was struggling to breathe. Nex had stopped breathing by the time emergency medical technicians arrived, and was declared dead at the hospital that evening.

== Investigation ==
Dan Yancy, Owasso Police Chief, said that "no report of the incident was made to the Owasso Police Department prior to the notification at the hospital." A search warrant dated February 9 resulted in the collection of 137 pictures from the school, two swabs of stains from the bathroom, as well as records and other documents related to involved students.

In a February 20 statement, an Owasso Police spokesperson said school staff and students were being interviewed by detectives. The spokesperson also said the police investigation would be provided to the Tulsa County District Attorney's Office to review for prosecution. In a February 21 statement, Owasso Police wrote on Facebook, "While the investigation continues into the altercation, preliminary information from the medical examiner's office is that a complete autopsy was performed and indicated that the decedent did not die as a result of trauma" and "further comments on the cause of death are currently pending until toxicology results and other ancillary testing results are received."

On February 21, a police department spokesperson said hallway video from inside the school, showing Benedict before and after the incident, had been reviewed by investigators. On February 23, the Owasso police released footage from school surveillance cameras, officer-worn body cameras, and audio of the 911 calls made by Sue Benedict on February 7 and 8.

A spokesperson for the Owasso Police Department said in a statement to Popular Information that the medical examiner had not explicitly said that Benedict's death was unrelated to the head injuries, and that the Owasso Police had reached out to the examiner's office in order to head off national scrutiny. On February 23, in a statement by their attorney, the Benedict family said they were independently investigating Benedict's death.

On February 27, an Owasso police spokesperson stated to NBC News that the medical examiner's office had not ruled out the fight as a possible cause or contributor to Benedict's death and added that "people shouldn't make assumptions either way."

=== March 13 summary autopsy report ===
On March 13, the Oklahoma medical examiner's summary report was released, ruling Benedict's cause of death a suicide from a combined toxicity of two pharmaceutical drugs: diphenhydramine (an antihistamine and sedative commonly known under the brand name Benadryl) and fluoxetine (a selective serotonin reuptake inhibitor antidepressant known under the brand name Prozac).

On March 14, family members of Benedict released a statement through their attorney and said they had reviewed the complete autopsy report and did not want the ruling of suicide to overshadow other findings in the report, saying, "Rather than allow incomplete accounts to take hold and spread any further, the Benedicts feel compelled to provide a summary of those findings which have not yet been released by the Medical Examiner's office, particularly those that contradict allegations of the assault on Nex being insignificant...the Medical Examiner found numerous areas of physical trauma over Nex's body that evidence the severity of the assault."

Following the release of the summary autopsy report, a police investigation was reported to continue into the school bathroom incident and whether Benedict was subject to gender-based violence.

=== March 21 District Attorney announcement ===
On March 21, Tulsa County District Attorney Steve Kunzweiler announced that no criminal charges would be filed in response to the altercation on February 7 or Benedict's death on February 8. Kunzweiler stated detectives had assessed the altercation as "an instance of mutual combat", and based on the evidence collected, he agreed with this assessment. Kunzweiler also said police had found "some brief notes, written by Benedict, which appeared to be related to the suicide" and said the contents were of a personal nature. According to Kunzweiler, the notes "do not make any reference to the earlier fight or difficulties at school" and the Tulsa County District Attorney's Office would not release the notes. Kunzweiler also noted that the medications found to be the cause of death were "legally available within the home where Benedict resided."

=== March 27 full autopsy report ===
On March 27, the Oklahoma medical examiner released a full autopsy report with a toxicology report, citing suicide as Benedict's manner of death. Combined toxicity of diphenhydramine and fluoxetine was ruled to be the cause of death. The report also referenced handwritten notes found in Benedict's room by family members that were "suggestive of self-harm".

The Oklahoma medical examiner report also described several injuries on Benedict's head and neck, including two contusions, two small lacerations, two abrasions, and hemorrhaging on their right cheek and ear. Other injuries noted by the report included injuries described as likely caused by attempted resuscitation, as well as various contusions and abrasions on Benedict's limbs. The report also states injuries to Benedict from the altercation on February 7 were not lethal and found no brain injury.

Other medical examiners and forensic pathologists reacting to the report have suggested that though fluoxetine levels in the report were not necessarily alarming, diphenhydramine was likely elevated to ranges consistent with cases of death.

== Aftermath ==
Early news reports following Benedict's death on February 8, 2024 were limited and misgendered Benedict. The Los Angeles Blade, an LGBTQ newspaper, reported on Benedict's death on February 19, and more in-depth and widespread news coverage began on February 20.

A national hotline run by the Indianapolis-based Rainbow Youth Project reported receiving over 200 calls from Oklahoma in the weekend following Benedict's death, more than three times the usual amount, with many mentioning Benedict's death, and most reporting having been bullied. By March 7, contacts had continued to exceed the typical amount, including close to 1000 calls and online messages after February 16. According to Lance Preston, the founder of the Rainbow Youth Project, greater awareness of the services offered by the group contributed to the increase in contacts.

In a letter to parents reported on February 16, 2024, Owasso Public Schools said it would be increasing the number of security personnel within the district, updating their safety drills and rules, and providing additional counseling services for students affected by the death. On February 22, Owasso Police Department spokesperson Nick Boatman said that a number of threats have been made towards Owasso Public Schools following Benedict's death. Boatman stated that the Owasso Police Department had brought in several other agencies, including the Department of Homeland Security and FBI, as part of a statewide task force to track down the individuals who have made the threats. Benedict's family issued a statement asking that threats against school employees and students should cease. They also requested that authorities take action in Benedict's case, and called for greater action to address school bullying.

=== Federal civil rights investigation ===
Soon after Nex's death, the Human Rights Campaign urged the Department of Justice and Department of Education to request an investigation of Owasso High School, and whether the school had "unlawfully failed to address the discrimination and harassment to which Nex was subjected." On March 1, the Office for Civil Rights division of the Department of Education informed the Human Rights Campaign that they were opening an investigation into the Oklahoma school district, and specifically "Whether the District failed to appropriately respond to alleged harassment of students in a manner consistent with the requirements of Title IX" and "Whether the District failed to appropriately respond to alleged harassment of students in a manner consistent with the requirements of Section 504 and Title II." A spokesperson for the school district said the district is "committed to cooperating with federal officials and believes the complaint submitted by Human Rights Campaign is not supported by the facts and is without merit."

=== Vigils and memorials ===
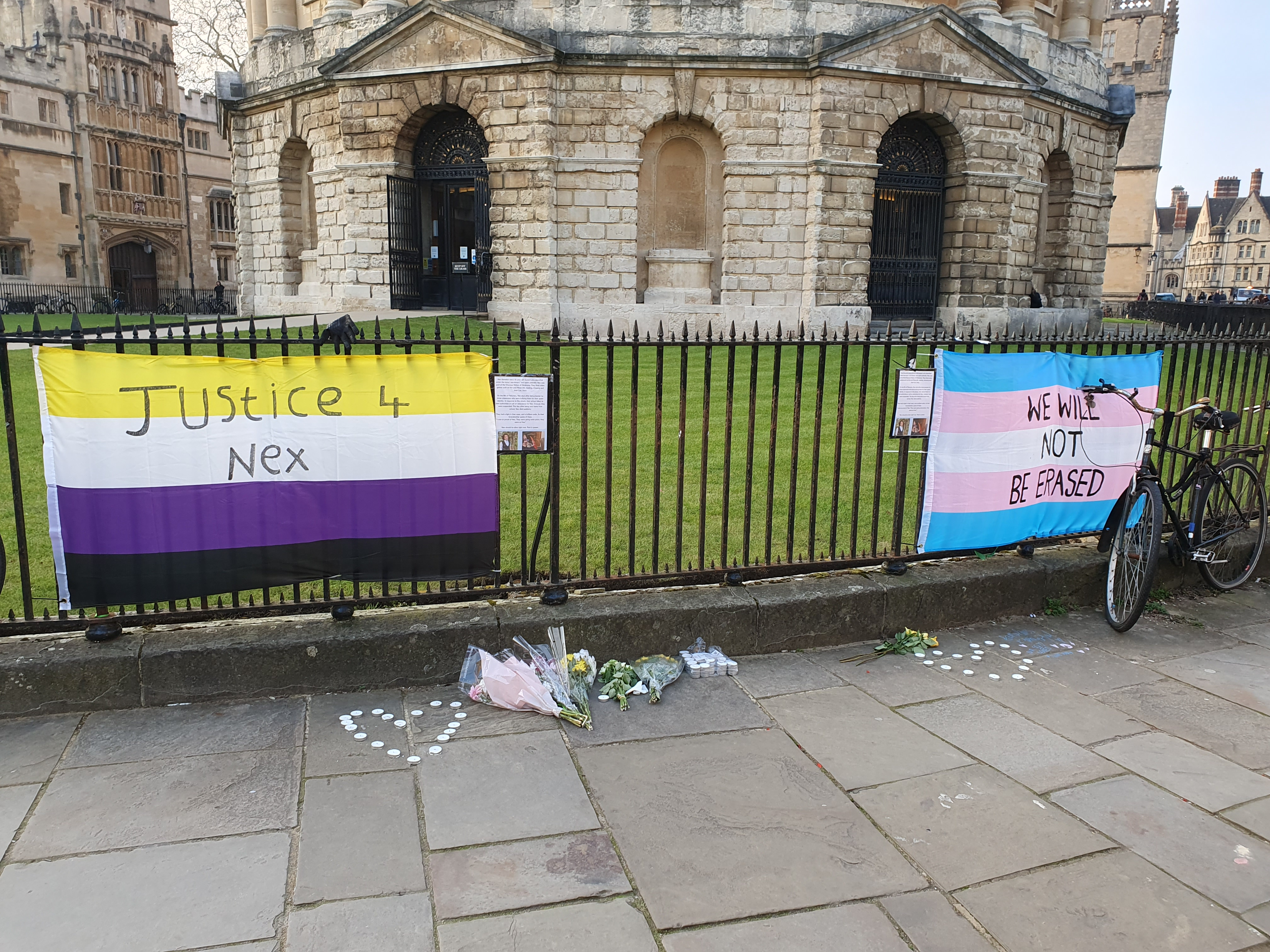
Memorial left after a vigil outside the Radcliffe Camera in Oxford, United Kingdom in March 2024

Vigils honoring Benedict were held between February 23 and 25, in various locations in Benedict's home state of Oklahoma, including Owasso, as well as across the United States, including at the Stonewall Inn. During the vigil in Owasso, some participants used masculine pronouns when referring to Benedict, and some friends later told NBC News that Benedict used he/him pronouns primarily and also used they/them pronouns.

On February 26, at least 40 students at Owasso High School participated in a school walk out, citing concerns about bullying and in support of the LGBTQ community at the school and in the city. One of the student organizers of the walkout, who is nonbinary, told NBC News in advance of the walkout, "To me, it doesn't matter if Nex passed from a traumatic brain injury or if they passed from suicide. What matters is the fact that they died after getting bullied, and that is the story for so many other students. I've been close to ending it myself because of bullying. It's not new for so many students."

In April 2024, Jesse Warne painted a mural in honor of Benedict at the Plaza Walls in Oklahoma City.

== Reactions ==
=== Initial reactions ===
==== Officials ====
On February 20, Oklahoma state representative Mauree Turner, the first publicly non-binary state lawmaker, described Benedict's death as "a direct result of a failed administration in a public school that didn't value the life of a trans student." The Congressional Equality Caucus said in a written statement on February 21, "It's more important than ever to stand up to anti-trans hate, violence, & legislation across the country." United States Secretary of Education Miguel Cardona wrote in a statement on February 21, "I can't put into words the grief that I feel for Nex, their family, and their community...It is our responsibility to protect all students by creating spaces where they feel safe to be their true selves."

Ryan Walters, the Oklahoma Superintendent of Public Instruction, defended Oklahoma's anti-LGBTQ policies in a February 23 interview with The New York Times regarding Benedict's death, saying: "There's not multiple genders. There's two. That's how God created us." Walters also said, "I think it's terrible that we've had some radical leftists who decided to run with a political agenda and try to weave a narrative that hasn't been true" and "You've taken a tragedy, and you've had some folks try to exploit it for political gain."

During a February 23 panel in Tahlequah, Oklahoma, Republican state senator Tom Woods said that his "heart goes out" in regards to Benedict's death, and said Oklahoma is a religious, Christian, and moral state whose constituency "doesn't want that filth in Oklahoma". Oklahoma Senate President Pro Tempore Greg Treat responded by describing comments by Woods as "reprehensible and inappropriate" and "not in any way reflective of myself, the Senate Republican caucus, Senate leadership or the Senate overall."

On February 23, Vice President Kamala Harris said that her "heart goes out to Nex Benedict's family" and that she stood with LGBTQ youth.

On March 14, President Joe Biden released a statement that said "Every young person deserves to have the fundamental right and freedom to be who they are, and feel safe and supported at school and in their communities," and said that he and First Lady Jill Biden were "heartbroken" by the loss. Biden also said, "Non-binary and transgender people are some of the bravest Americans I know ... In memory of Nex, we must all recommit to our work to end discrimination and address the suicide crisis impacting too many nonbinary and transgender children ... Parents and schools must take reports of bullying seriously."

==== Advocacy groups ====
On February 19, LGBTQ advocacy group Freedom Oklahoma released a statement describing the reported incident that preceded Benedict's death as "a possible hate-motivated attack" while acknowledging "a still incomplete picture" of what happened, and offered information about support resources such as the Trans Lifeline, the Trevor Project, and the LGBT hotline. The group linked the death of Benedict to Oklahoma laws and policies, and related rhetoric, including statements by Chaya Raichik on her Libs of TikTok social media accounts. The ACLU and Lambda Legal also condemned the legislative environment, including the recent passage of Oklahoma Bill 615, and said that it had led to Nex's death.

A February 28 open letter organized by the advocacy groups addressed to more than 350 local, state, and national organizations, as well as public figures, requested an investigation of the Oklahoma State Department of Education and the removal of Walters from his position, accusing him of allowing "rampant harassment" and creating an "environment that allows for hostility and harm." Public figures who signed the letter include Kristin Chenoweth, Demi Lovato, Cynthia Nixon, k.d. lang, Jonathan Van Ness, Amy Schneider, Peppermint, Emma Roberts, and Tommy Dorfman. Walters described the letter as "a standard tactic of the radical left."

On March 6, about six members of the anti-LGBT Westboro Baptist Church group held a demonstration outside of Owasso High School for about an hour, which was responded to by several hundred counterprotesters organized by local and national organizations including the Rainbow Youth Project.

A year after Benedict's death, Sarah Adams and Kendra Wilson Clements of Cousins, which supports Indigenous LGBTQ youth in Oklahoma, connected Nex's death to the ongoing problem of Missing and Murdered Indigenous People (MMIP) in an interview with Teen Vogue.

=== Reactions to investigation ===
Kelley Robinson, the president of the Human Rights Campaign, released a statement after the release of the summary report that continued to call for investigation into Benedict's death, and said, "Nex was failed by so many and should still be here today," and expressed condolences to Benedict's family. Freedom Oklahoma released a statement that said, "We have a responsibility to acknowledge the role anti-trans policies and rhetoric continue to play," and the summary report "only further emphasizes the state of crisis our youth are in."

Ryan Walters, the Oklahoma Superintendent of Public Instruction, released a statement that said, "The loss of our student in Owasso is tragic for the family, the community, and our state. The LGBTQ groups pushing a false narrative are one of the biggest threats to our democracy and I remain, more than ever, committed to never backing down from a woke mob." Oklahoma Attorney General Gentner Drummond posted a statement on X stating his "heart is broken" by Benedict's death, and "the Medical Examiner's finding of suicide makes me even more concerned that bullying played a role in this terrible loss."

On March 13, Democratic Oklahoma state representative Mauree Turner said, "Whether or not it was a suicide, the rhetoric that we share on this House floor, the bills that we write - not even the bills that we pass - but the bills that we write, have a very detrimental effect on the youth of Oklahoma." Oklahoma House Democratic Leader Cyndi Munson released a statement that said, "I believe Nex Benedict's death is a direct result of a society and government that consistently pushes back and restricts their identity and those of other LGBTQ+ individuals. To LGBTQ+ people grappling with this tragedy, we see you and we are doing everything we can to stop the harmful legislation and policies that attack your existence." On March 14, a group of Republican members of the Oklahoma House of Representatives issued a statement that said, "The tragic suicide of Nex Benedict is a harsh reminder of the power that words have."

After the March 21 announcement by the DA's office, the Human Rights Campaign renewed its call for an independent investigation and said that Benedict had been failed by their school and elected officials, "who allowed a culture of bullying and harassment to grow unchecked." GLAAD president Sarah Kate Ellis also called for an independent investigation, and stated, "Everyone from Superintendent Walters and Owasso high school to the unaccredited-since-2009 state medical examiner's office, the district attorney, and Owasso police department have failed Nex."

Nicole McAfree of Freedom Oklahoma responded to Kunzweiler's use of Benedict's birth name, stating that "A statement that deadnames a trans victim as its opening sentence is one that clearly indicates the brand of justice doled out by DA Kunzweiler's office – one that does not include or respect Two Spirit, transgender, or gender nonconforming+ (2STGNC+) people."

In response to the release of the full report, the president of the Human Rights Campaign stated, "The full report does little to fill in the gaps in information about that day or the more than a year of bullying and harassment that led up to it." Freedom Oklahoma asked Oklahoma lawmakers to oppose anti-LGBTQ laws, and said "the very least we can do in Nex's memory is demonstrate our commitment to building a better world that makes it impossible for this heartbreaking tragedy to happen again."

=== Others ===
Shortly after Benedict's death, Judith Butler spoke about transgender rights and Benedict's death in an interview with Teen Vogue:

"People who have skepticism about trans issues, they have to allow themselves to be transformed by what they hear. [...] About the Nex thing, I remember being bullied in that bathroom. I remember being pushed up against the wall in that bathroom, and I thought, These girls are much bigger than me and I don't stand a chance here. There was something about that Nex Benedict thing, it really got to me."

== See also ==
- 2020s anti-LGBTQ movement in the United States – Political backlash against LGBTQ people
- History of violence against LGBTQ people in the United States
- Violence against LGBTQ people
- Suicide among LGBTQ youth
- List of suicides of LGBTQ people
- List of suicides attributed to bullying
