= Oklahoma Senate Bill 1100 =

2022 Oklahoma law

Senate Bill 1100

58th Oklahoma Legislature
- Long title: An Act relating to vital records; amending 63 O.S. 2021, Sections 1-311, 1-313, 1-316, and 1-321, which relate to certificates of birth; limiting biological sex designation on certificate of birth to male or female; prohibiting nonbinary designation; making language gender neutral; updating statutory language; and declaring an emergency.
- Territorial extent: Oklahoma
- Passed by: Oklahoma Senate
- Passed: 24 March 2022
- Passed by: Oklahoma House of Representatives
- Passed: 21 April 2022

Legislative history

Initiating chamber: Oklahoma Senate
- Introduced by: Micheal Bergstrom
- Committee responsible: Health and Human Services
- Passed: 24 March 2022
- Voting summary: 38 voted for; 7 voted against
- Committee report: 28 February 2022

Revising chamber: Oklahoma House of Representatives
- Member(s) in charge: Sheila Dills
- Committee responsible: Public Health
- Passed: 21 April 2022
- Voting summary: 75 voted for; 16 voted against
- Committee report: 6 April 2022

Summary
- Bans non-binary markers on birth certificates
- Status: In force

Oklahoma Senate Bill 1100 (SB 1100) is a 2022 law in the state of Oklahoma which bans sex markers other than male or female on birth certificates. According to Lambda Legal, Oklahoma is the first US state to pass such a law.

== Background ==
SB 1100 was first filed in October 2021 in response to the then-ongoing court case Loreleid v. Oklahoma State Department of Health where a person born in Oklahoma had been refused a birth certificate with a non-binary gender marker by the Department of Health. The Department of Health settled the case, forcing Oklahoma to issue birth certificates with non-binary gender markers.

On 8 November 2021, Oklahoma governor Kevin Stitt signed Executive Order 2021-24, reversing the settlement and calling on members of the Oklahoma State Legislature to pass a bill to clarify the law.

== Provisions ==
The provisions of the act include:

- Amending Oklahoma Statutes 63-1-311 (Birth certificates), 63-1-313 (Delayed birth certificate), 63-1-316 (New certificate of birth), and 63-1-321 (Amendment of certificate or record) to not allow any symbol representing a non-binary marker to be used as the biological sex designation on a birth certificate.
- Declaring a state of emergency, allowing the act to take effect and come into force immediately upon approval.

== Passage through the legislature ==
=== Bill sponsors ===
SB 1100 was authored by Senator Micheal Bergstrom and Representative Sheila Dills. The bill was sponsored by twenty legislators, eight members of the Oklahoma Senate and twelve of the Oklahoma House of Representatives, all Republican. The eight Senators were:

- Micheal Bergstrom
- Julie Daniels
- Roland Pederson
- Shane Jett
- Jake Merrick
- Blake Stephens
- Dewayne Pemberton
- David Bullard

The twelve Representatives were:

- Sheila Dills
- Dustin Roberts
- Sean Roberts
- Kevin McDugle
- Josh West
- Kevin West
- Denise Hader
- Jim Olsen
- David Hardin
- Gerrid Kendrix
- Brad Boles
- Steve Bashore

=== Stages ===
Bergstrom filed the bill on October 20, 2021, before the second session of the 58th Oklahoma Legislature convened in February 2022. It was found to have no fiscal considerations to the state.

SB 1100 had its first reading in the Oklahoma Senate on 7 February 2022 and its second reading the next day, when it was referred to the Senate Health and Human Services Committee. On 28 February, the Committee voted 7–3 to recommend that the Senate pass SB 1100; Julie Daniels, Jessica Garvin, Adam Pugh, Frank Simpson, Rob Standridge, John Haste and Paul Rosino voted for the recommendation, and Jo Anna Dossett, Carri Hicks and George E. Young voted against it. On 24 March, the Senate passed SB 1100 with 38 'ayes' and 7 'nays'.

On April 6, the bill was passed by the House Public Health Committee by a 7–1 vote; Sherrie Conley, Toni Hasenbeck, Dell Kerbs, Carl Newton, Cynthia Roe, Marilyn Stark and Wendi Stearman voted for it, and only Ajay Pittman voted against. The House passed the bill on April 21 by 75–16. The Oklahoma Democratic Party accused Republican state legislators of "hateful rhetoric" and personal attacks on Mauree Turner during House debates on the bill. Turner, the representative for Oklahoma's 88th House district, is the first non-binary person elected to a state legislature.

SB 1100 was sent to Governor Kevin Stitt on 25 April and signed the next day.

== Response ==
=== Support ===
Bergstrom said that the bill was "common sense" and that "it's not a complicated issue – biologically, you're either a male or female". Dills argued that the bill provided "clarity and truth on official state documents" and that markers should be "based on established medical fact and not an ever-changing social dialogue".

=== Opposition ===
On the day the bill was debated, Mauree Turner, a member of the Oklahoma House of Representatives and the first publicly non-binary U.S. state lawmaker, tweeted that the bill was "a very extreme and grotesque use of power".

Nicole McAfee, executive director of Freedom Oklahoma, said that the LGBTQ+ community in Oklahoma would "continue to fight for a state where we have full equality under the law". Cathryn Oakley, senior counsel with the Human Rights Campaign, said in a statement that banning non-binary birth certificates "is just another attempt to erase the identity of transgender and non-binary people" and that it went against the wishes of "the vast majority of Oklahomans". The ACLU also opposed the bill.

In an editorial, The Norman Transcript condemned the legislature for "[choosing] to take action it knows will harm LGBTQ+ Oklahomans" and "specifically targeting [LGBTQ+ people] and their very safe existence in our state".

== Legal challenges ==
Both before and after the bill was signed, there was discussion about its constitutionality being challenged, especially after the federal case of Zzyym v. Pompeo, where the US Department of State was ordered to provide non-binary passports.

== See also ==
- Discrimination against non-binary people
- Legal recognition of non-binary gender
- LGBT rights in Oklahoma
- Transgender rights in the United States
