= Rainbow Youth Project =

U.S. non-profit that aims to support LGBTQ+ youth

Rainbow Youth Project USA is an American non-profit organization that aims to provide support for LGBTQ youth.

Rainbow Youth Project was established in 2022. According to the Communications Manager of the organization, the primary purpose of the group is to promote the health, safety and well-being of LGBTQIA+ youth, with a core program that provides meaningful access to free indefinite mental health counseling. The organization reported an average of 300 calls per day, in March 2023, with a large majority of callers mentioning cyberbullying. The organization also provides gender affirming care and support to many in areas affected by anti-LGBTQ+ legislation. Following multiple legislation passed in Florida in 2023, the organization reported that multiple callers reported conservative political rhetoric as part of their calls, with others wanting to quit school; this caused the organization to pivot and look for alternative or virtual schooling methods.

The services provided have led to false accusations of grooming and pedophilia by organizations such as Moms for Liberty and Libs of TikTok, and death threats which have been followed up with local authorities. Following the death of Nex Benedict, the Rainbow Youth Project was reported as receiving over 200 calls from Oklahoma in the weekend following Benedict's death, more than three times the usual amount.

== See also ==
- 2020s anti-LGBTQ movement in the United States
- LGBTQ youth vulnerability
- List of LGBTQ-related organizations and conferences
- Rainbow Youth
- The Trevor Project
- Transgender youth
