= Sheila Dills =

American politician (born 1967)

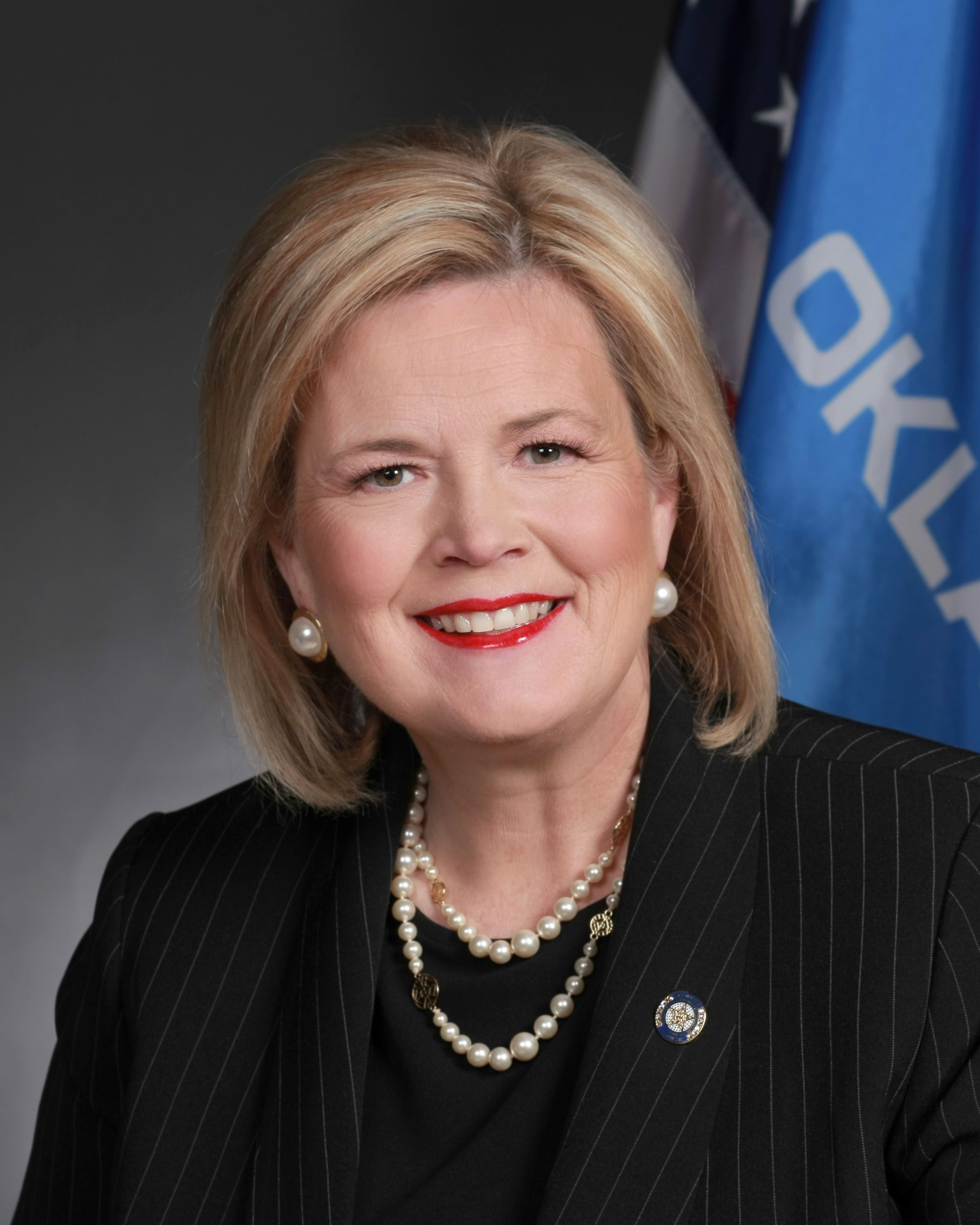

Majority Caucus Chair of the Oklahoma House of Representatives
- In office November 2020 – November 16, 2022
- Preceded by: Tammy West

Assistant Majority Floor Leader of the Oklahoma House of Representatives
- In office January 3, 2019 – November 2020

Member of the Oklahoma House of Representatives from the 69th district
- In office November 15, 2018 – November 16, 2022
- Preceded by: Chuck Strohm
- Succeeded by: Mark Tedford

Personal details
- Born: July 10, 1967 (age 59)
- Party: Republican

Sheila Dills (born July 10, 1967) is an American politician who served in the Oklahoma House of Representatives from the 69th district from 2018 to 2022.

Dills retired from the Oklahoma House at the end of her term in 2022.

== Career ==
=== 57th Oklahoma Legislature ===
Dills was the author of House Bill 1395 (2019) "Virtual Charter Financial Transparency", which became law, and makes charter schools in Oklahoma itemize out spending to the state educational committees. Dills later stated that during the passage of House Bill 1395 she was forced to meet with Epic Charter Schools co-founder Ben Harris. While Harris agreed to the language in the bill, its requirements would later lead to his arrest for falsifying invoices required by the bill.

=== 58th Oklahoma Legislature ===
Dills authored House Bill 1735 (2021), which died in committee, to increase oversight of charters schools and education management organizations.

Dills was a supporter of Senate Bill 2 (2021), a controversial transphobic sports bill, and Oklahoma Senate Bill 1100, which banned non-binary gender markers on birth certificates.

=== Retirement ===
Dills announced she would retire and not seek re-election in 2022. After announcing her retirement, she told the Tulsa World "The culture (of the Legislature) is ridiculous. The people of Oklahoma are getting ripped off big time. … It’s a disgusting environment.”

In January 2024, she opened the Patisserie by Sheila Anne, a French bakery in Jenks, Oklahoma.
