= Micheal Bergstrom =

American politician

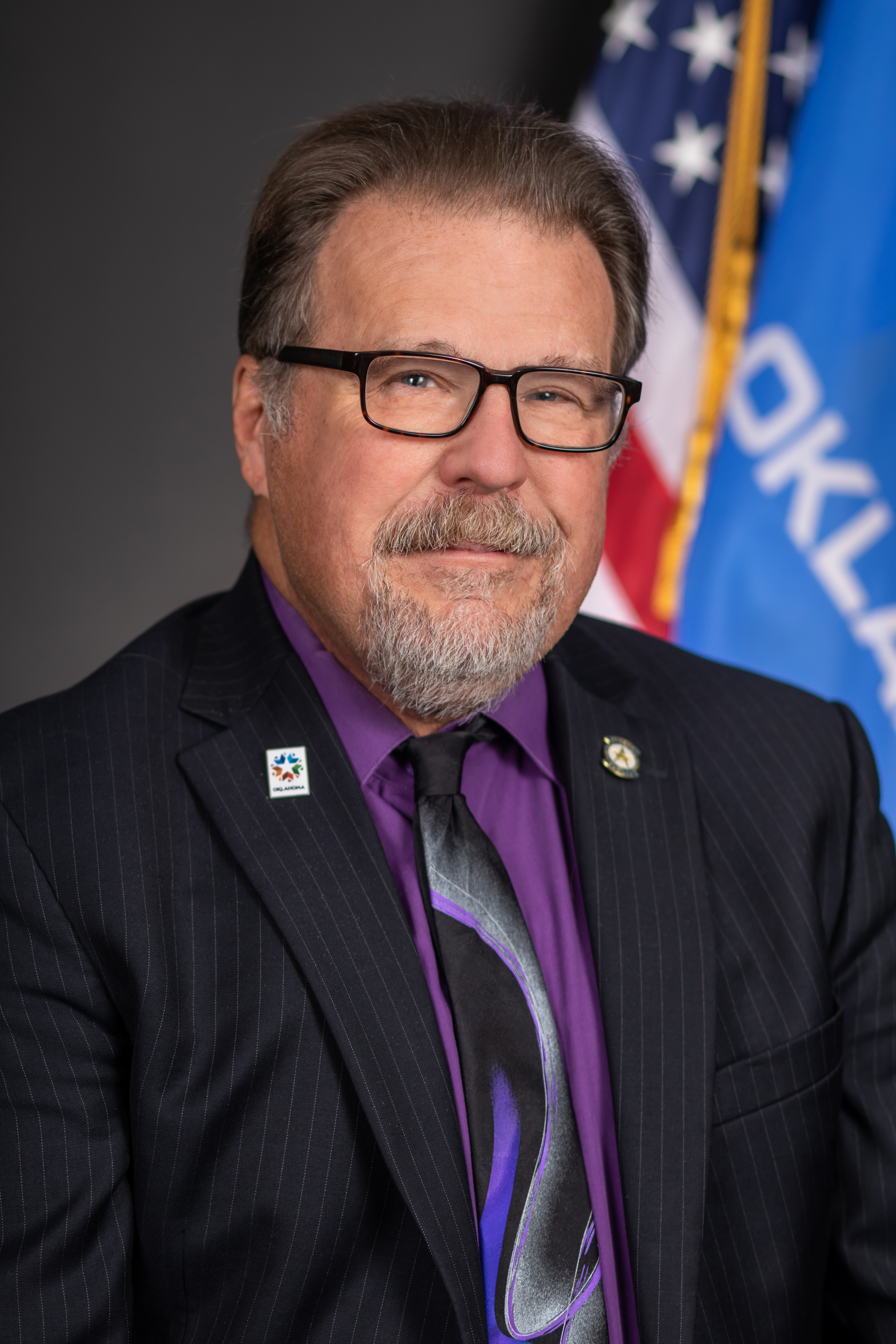

Member of the Oklahoma Senate from the 1st district
- Incumbent
- Assumed office November 16, 2016
- Preceded by: Charles Wyrick

Personal details
- Born: Micheal Ray Bergstrom; 1957 or 1958 (age 67–68) Illinois, U.S.
- Party: Republican
- Spouse: Robin Elaine Horner
- Children: 4
- Education: University of South Florida, Northeastern State University
- Occupation: educator, writer

Micheal Ray Bergstrom (born May 5, 1958) is a Republican member of the Oklahoma Senate, representing the 1st district. He was initially elected in November 2016.

Bergstrom sponsored legislation to prohibit nonbinary gender markers on birth certificates. Bergstrom argued, "It’s not a complicated issue — biologically, you’re either a male or female. There should be no other option to choose from on a birth certificate." According to the American Medical Association, "empirical evidence has demonstrated that trans and nonbinary gender identities are normal variations of human identity and expression." It was signed into law by Oklahoma governor Kevin Stitt in 2022. He also authored another bill Stitt signed into law the same year banning transgender women athletes from competing in women's sports.

== Electoral history ==
2024 Oklahoma Senate 1st district Republican primary
Party	Candidate	Votes	%
Republican	Michael Bergstrom	3,328	53.4%
Republican	Houston Brittain	2,907	46.6%
Total votes		6,235	100%
