= 2004 Oklahoma State Question 711 =

Referendum banning same-sex marriage

State Question 711
- November 2, 2004
- Oklahoma Definition of Marriage Amendment

Results
Choice	Votes	%
Yes	1,075,216	75.59%
No	347,303	24.41%
Valid votes	1,422,519	97.18%
Invalid or blank votes	41,239	2.82%
Total votes	1,463,758	100.00%
Registered voters/turnout	2,143,978	66.35%
- County results Yes 80–90% 70–80% 60–70%

Oklahoma Question 711 of 2004, was an amendment to the Oklahoma Constitution that defined marriage as the union of a man and a woman, thus rendering recognition or performance of same-sex marriages or civil unions null within the state prior to its being ruled unconstitutional. The referendum was approved by 76 percent of the voters.

On January 14, 2014, Judge Terence C. Kern of the United States District Court for the Northern District of Oklahoma declared Question 711 unconstitutional. The case, Bishop v. United States (formerly Bishop v. Oklahoma), was then stayed pending appeal. On July 18, 2014, the United States Court of Appeals for the Tenth Circuit ruled that Oklahoma's ban was unconstitutional. On October 6, 2014, the Supreme Court of the United States rejected Oklahoma's request for review, overturning all state laws banning same-sex marriage.

== Contents ==
The text of the amendment states:

(a.) Marriage in this state shall consist only of the union of one man and one woman. Neither this Constitution nor any other provision of law shall be construed to require that marital status or the legal incidents thereof be conferred upon unmarried couples or groups.

(b.) A marriage between persons of the same gender performed in another state shall not be recognized as valid and binding in this state as of the date of the marriage.

(c.) Any person knowingly issuing a marriage license in violation of this section shall be guilty of a misdemeanor.

== Results ==
Results by precinct in the Oklahoma panhandle of the same-sex marriage ban referendum. Yes: 90–100%; 80–90%; 70–80%; 60–70%

Question 711
Choice	Votes	%
For	1,075,216	75.59
Against	347,303	24.41
Total	1,422,519	100.00
Registered voters/turnout	2,510,823	56.65

== See also ==
- Same-sex marriage in Oklahoma
- LGBT rights in Oklahoma
