= Finstuen v. Crutcher =

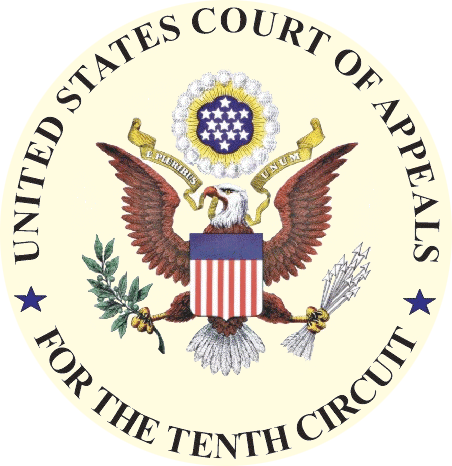
- Court: United States Court of Appeals for the Tenth Circuit
- Full case name: Finstuen v. Crutcher
- Decided: August 3, 2007
- Citation: 496 F.3d 1139 (10th Cir. 2007)

Holding
- A state law prohibiting recognition of adoption decrees granted by an out-of-state court to two parents in a same-sex relationship violates the Full Faith and Credit Clause. United States District Court for the Western District of Oklahoma affirmed.

Court membership
- Judges sitting: Harris L. Hartz, David M. Ebel, and Terrence O'Brien

Case opinions
- Majority: David M. Ebel, joined by Terrence O'Brien
- Concur/dissent: Harris L. Hartz

Finstuen v. Crutcher, 496 F.3d 1139 (10th Cir. 2007), is a case decided by the United States Court of Appeals for the Tenth Circuit that ordered Oklahoma to recognize an adoption of a child by a same-sex couple ordered by another state's court. In a 2-1 decision, the Court of Appeals affirmed the order of the District Court directing Oklahoma to issue a revised birth certificate for a child legally adopted in California, though born in Oklahoma, to recognize the adoption of the same-sex couple. This was one of the earliest federal court rulings in the United States to address adoption by same-sex couples.

== Background ==
Three same-sex couples each adopted a child in another state that had been born in Oklahoma, one in Washington, New Jersey and California. One of those couples had managed to get the Oklahoma State Department of Health to issue a birth certificate listing both men as parents of the child. The state legislature passed a law one month later voiding any future recognition of out-of-state adoptions of same-sex couples. The plaintiffs then brought their suit in district court.

== The Case ==
The United States District Court for the Western District of Oklahoma ruled in favor of the plaintiffs, ruling that the law banning same-sex adoption recognition violated the Full Faith and Credit Clause of the United States Constitution. The State of Oklahoma appealed and on August 3, 2007, the Court of Appeals ruled 2-1 that the statute is unconstitutional, affirming the district court. They also found that two of the couples bringing the suit had no Article III standing to challenge the law, including the named plaintiff, Heather Finstuen. However, they recognized the standing of the third plaintiff couple and ordered the new birth certificate. The dissenting judge wrote that because Oklahoma stated the statute does not prevent the issuance of birth certificates sought by the plaintiffs, there was no need to reach the constitutional issues. However, that issue was not raised at the trial court and thus he wrote to affirm the district court judgment regardless.
