= Public Facilities Privacy & Security Act =

2016 statute in North Carolina, US

North Carolina
- Long title: An Act to Provide for Single-sex Multiple Occupancy Bathroom and Changing Facilities in Schools and Public Agencies and to Create Statewide Consistency in Regulation of Employment and Public Accommodations
- Passed: March 23, 2016

Summary
- Preempts local anti-discrimination laws and minimum wages in favor of state law. Compelled schools and public facilities to restrict use of gender-segregated washrooms to users with the corresponding sex listed on their birth certificates.
- Status: Repealed

The Public Facilities Privacy & Security Act, commonly known as House Bill 2, Bathroom Bill, or HB2, was a North Carolina statute enacted in March 2016 and signed into law by Governor Pat McCrory. The bill amended state law to preempt any anti-discrimination ordinances passed by local communities and, controversially, compelled schools and state and local government facilities containing single-gender bathrooms to only allow people of the corresponding sex as listed on their birth certificate to use them; it also gave the state exclusive rights to determine the minimum wage.

The bathroom portion of the bill generated immense criticism for preventing transgender people who did not or could not alter their birth certificates from using the restroom consistent with their gender identity (at the time in North Carolina, only people who undergo sex reassignment surgery could change the sex on their birth certificates, and outside jurisdictions have different rules, some more restrictive), and for changing the definition of sex in the state's anti-discrimination law to "the physical condition of being male or female, which is stated on a person's birth certificate." The removal of municipal anti-discrimination protections was also criticized, as state-level protections do not explicitly cover discrimination based on sexual orientation or gender identity. Opponents of the bill described it as the most anti-LGBT legislation in the United States, while proponents of HB2 called it "common sense" legislation.

HB2 was met with widespread protests: state, county and city governments across the United States forbade their employees from non-essential travel to North Carolina; numerous corporations and firms curbed plans to hold events and create jobs in the state, and many performers canceled performances in North Carolina to boycott the state; North Carolina's economy lost over $400 million in investments and jobs. The bill was also criticized by several religious organizations, and President Barack Obama denounced it and called for its repeal. McCrory ultimately lost his bid for re-election in 2016 to Democratic Attorney General Roy Cooper, a vocal critic of the law.

The portion of the law regarding bathroom use was repealed on March 30, 2017, with the enactment of House Bill 142 (Session 2017 of the North Carolina General Assembly). The remainder of HB2, which barred local governments from passing anti-discrimination ordinances, was repealed on December 1, 2020, by a sunset provision, which was inserted below the partial repeal in House Bill 142, passed on March 30, 2017.

In response to the full repeal on December 1, 2020, many local governments across North Carolina almost immediately enacted local laws to protect LGBT people from discrimination and other local governments are considering enacting similar local laws.

== Background and passage ==
=== Charlotte Ordinance 7056 ===
On February 22, 2016, the Charlotte City Council passed by a 7–4 vote the Ordinance 7056, a non-discrimination ordinance prohibiting discrimination on the basis of sexual orientation or gender identity in public accommodations or by passenger vehicles for hire or city contractors. The Council had debated a similar ordinance in 2015, which failed by a 6–5 vote because it did not include full protection of transgender people; the council first considered extending non-discrimination protection to LGBT people in 1992. The ordinance was to take effect on April 1, 2016.

=== North Carolina House Bill 2 ===
On March 22, 2016, upon request from three-fifths of all the members of the North Carolina Senate and the North Carolina House of Representatives, its President and Speaker, respectively, called the General Assembly into special session for the following day. That day, March 23, the North Carolina House of Representatives passed House Bill 2, with 82 in favor and 26 against and 11 excused absences. About three hours later, the North Carolina Senate also passed the bill, with 32 in favor, 6 excused absences, and all 11 Democrats walking out in protest and not voting. That evening, it was signed by North Carolina Governor Pat McCrory, taking a total of 11 hours and 10 minutes to become a law. All Senate and House Republicans voted in favor of the bill, with the exceptions of Charles Jeter, Chuck McGrady, Gary Pendleton, Bob Rucho, and Dan Soucek, who were excused absent. Eleven House Democrats voted for the bill; Larry M. Bell, William D. Brisson, Elmer Floyd, Ken Goodman, Charles Graham, George Graham, Howard Hunter III, William O. Richardson, Garland Pierce, Brad Salmon, and Michael H. Wray. Senate and House Democrats Gale Adcock, Becky Carney, Beverly M. Earle, Susan C. Fisher, Paul Luebke, Joe Sam Queen, Evelyn Terry, Ken Waddell, Joyce Waddell, Angela Bryant, Joel D. M. Ford, and Jane W. Smith were excused absent. The independent representative Paul Tine, a member of the Republican caucus, voted against the bill.

Supporters of House Bill 2 said the Charlotte ordinance was sloppily written and overreaching, and that in their view its wording essentially did away with single-sex bathrooms. Representative Dan Bishop, the bill's sponsor, cited this as grounds for the state to override local ordinances.

Call volume to the Trans Lifeline transgender suicide-prevention hotline doubled after the passage of the bill. Some media noted, in connection to HB2, a study finding that denying transgender people access to restrooms of their gender increases the rate at which they attempt suicide.

== Enforcement ==
House Bill 2 did not contain any guidance on how it was supposed to be enforced and did not name any specific crimes or penalties. Police departments in Raleigh, Greensboro, Wilmington, and Asheville expressed a lack of clarity on how the law should be enforced and an unwillingness to devote police resources to monitor bathrooms. A number of departments indicated a willingness to respond to complaints of violations, but said none had been received.

Republican State Representative Dan Bishop, a co-sponsor of the law, acknowledged that "there are no enforcement provisions or penalties in HB2." Democratic State Representative Rodney W. Moore was more emphatic, saying: "There is absolutely no way to enforce this law, as it relates to the enforcement of the bathroom provisions. It is an utterly ridiculous law."

== Economic impact ==
Although the full economic impact of House Bill 2 on North Carolina's economy is difficult to fully quantify, some economic consequences have been noted. As of September 2016, rough estimates put North Carolina's full economic loss due to the law at around 0.1% of the state's gross domestic product. The Associated Press estimated that House Bill 2 would cost the state US$3.76 billion over twelve years.

Some companies halted or reconsidered their plans to expand to North Carolina as a result of the passage of the law:

- PayPal announced they would no longer move forward with their expansion into Charlotte, which would have created over 400 jobs with a US$20 million annual payroll impact.
- Red Ventures re-evaluated plans to expand into North Carolina and bring 500 people in 2016 and thousands after that.
- German global banking and financial services company Deutsche Bank announced plans to halt a planned expansion of their Cary offices which would have employed 250 people.
- Real estate research company CoStar Group decided against a 730-job expansion into Charlotte, with House Bill 2 playing a deciding role.

On April 14, 2016, the San Diego-based electronics audio company 1MORE USA Inc. announced it would suspend its sales to North Carolina.

During an appearance by McCrory on Meet the Press on April 17, 2016, host Chuck Todd said that, by his conservative estimate, North Carolina had lost at least US$39.7 million in revenue as a result of House Bill 2.

On April 22, 2016, Time Warner Cable News North Carolina estimated that House Bill 2 had to date cost North Carolina more than 1750 jobs and more than $77 million of investments and visitor spending, including:

- $14.3 million in Buncombe County
- $46.2 million and 500 jobs in Charlotte
- $5 million in Greensboro
- $3.2 million in the Triangle area of Raleigh, Durham, and Chapel Hill

On May 24, 2016, the Charlotte Chamber of Commerce estimated that Mecklenburg County had lost $285 million and 1,300 jobs from the loss of PayPal and the estimated 908 spinoff jobs they estimated that it would have produced.

=== Tourism and hospitality ===
States and municipalities banning publicly funded travel to North Carolina Publicly funded travel banned by state government Publicly funded travel banned by state, city and county government Publicly funded travel banned by city and state government Publicly funded travel banned by county government Publicly funded travel banned by city and county government Publicly funded travel banned by city government

As of December 2, 2016, the states of California, Connecticut, Minnesota, New York, Vermont, and Washington; the District of Columbia; the counties of Cuyahoga (Ohio), Dane (Wisconsin), Franklin (Ohio), Los Angeles (California), Montgomery (Maryland), Multnomah (Oregon), and Summit (Ohio); and the cities of Atlanta, Baltimore, Berkeley, Boston, Chicago, Cincinnati, Columbus, Dayton, Honolulu, Long Beach, Los Angeles, Madison, Miami Beach, New York City, Oakland, Philadelphia, Portland (Maine), Portland (Oregon), Providence, Royal Oak, Salt Lake City, San Francisco, San Jose, Santa Fe, Seattle, Shoreline (Washington), Tampa, West Palm Beach, and Wilton Manors, had issued travel bans in response to House Bill 2, barring government employees from non-essential travel to North Carolina.

On March 28, 2016, High Point Market, the largest home furnishings trade show in the world and the largest economic event in North Carolina, issued a press release expressing concern for "hundreds and perhaps thousands" of customers boycotting their biannual event in April as a result of the law but according to numbers released on May 27, 2016, by the High Point Market, registered attendees only dipped slightly.

Community Transportation Association of America canceled plans to bring 1,000 people to Wake County in June 2018 for a weeklong event, deciding instead to hold its event in Baltimore. Event organizers planned to book a total of 2,511 room nights and spend an estimated $1.7 million.

Organizers of a planned "Record Store Day" canceled a three-day event for September. The Raleigh Convention and Visitors Bureau estimated this event would have generated $191,000 in economic spending.

The Charlotte Regional Visitors Authority said that 29 groups had expressed concerns about their plans to host events in Charlotte, risking an estimated 103,000 hotel-nights for the city.

The Raleigh Convention and Visitors Bureau said four events had been cancelled in the Raleigh area due to House Bill 2, causing a loss of US$700,000 in revenue.

Hotel chain Westin said that 12 groups had inquired about cancelling events booked at Westin's Charlotte hotel, including the Southern Sociological Society, for which they will lose US$180,000 to US$4 million.

In early April, a police conference in Duck on human trafficking prevention was canceled due to a travel ban on North Carolina issued by the mayor of Washington, D.C.

On April 9, 2016, the head of the Los Angeles County Metropolitan Transportation Authority announced that he had barred agency employees from travelling to Charlotte for a conference. Metro Transit announced it would also cancel plans to send employees to the same conference. Central Ohio Transit Authority followed suit a few days later.

On April 25, 2016, The American Institute of Architects announced that it will move its South Atlantic Region conference, which was originally scheduled to be held September 29 through October 2 at the Wilmington Convention Center in Wilmington. The four-day business conference accommodates between 1000 and 1200 people, including architects, exhibitors, and speakers from North Carolina, South Carolina, and Georgia. In its statement, the AIA called for "the judicious and timely repeal of HB 2 in North Carolina as soon as the General Assembly convenes".

On April 25, 2016, the W. K. Kellogg Foundation announced that they had cancelled plans to host a conference at The Omni Grove Park Inn in Asheville, at a loss of US$1.5 million to the state's economy.

On January 16, 2017, the SIGMOD Executive Committee decided to move the ACM SIGMOD/PODS 2017 joint conference out of North Carolina to a new location.

=== Film industry ===
Several filming projects were canceled or reconsidered. Lionsgate canceled plans to film the pilot for its Hulu series Crushed in Charlotte, which would have involved hiring about 100 workers. The company continued to move ahead with shooting a musical remake of Dirty Dancing in Henderson and Jackson counties. A&E Networks announced that they would finish production of the History miniseries Six, but would not consider North Carolina for any new productions. 21st Century Fox also announced their opposition to the law and that they would "reconsider future filming commitments in North Carolina if the Act is not repealed". Turner Broadcasting announced that it would finish production of Good Behavior in Wilmington but would reevaluate doing further business in North Carolina if the law is not repealed.

Director Rob Reiner called for a boycott of North Carolina by the entertainment industry and said he would no longer film in the state. Documentary film producer Michael Moore announced that his movie Where to Invade Next would not be licensed to theaters in North Carolina.

=== Sports ===
The NBA, NCAA, NFL and ESPN's X Games spoke out against the law, reconsidering plans to host future sporting events in North Carolina. NBA Commissioner Adam Silver informed North Carolina's governor and legislature that "it would be problematic for us to move forward with our [2017] All-Star Game if there is not a change in the law", and when no changes were made, on July 21, 2016, the game was pulled out of Charlotte. Some estimates put the potential economic loss of the state at over $100 million. The 2017 NBA All-Star Game was the first major sporting event in the United States to be relocated for political reasons since 1990.

The U.S. Golf Association stated that they are "committed to ensuring an inclusive environment at all of our championships" and would continue to "monitor and assess" the situation in North Carolina.

The NHL's Carolina Hurricanes and PNC Arena said they "are devoted to providing a welcoming and respectful environment for all fans. We stand against all forms of discrimination." Michael Jordan, owner of the NBA's Charlotte Hornets and a North Carolina native, spoke against House Bill 2 and said the Charlotte Hornets and Hornets Sports & Entertainment are "opposed to discrimination in any form." Brian France, chairman and CEO of NASCAR, said that NASCAR also opposes the law.

On September 12, 2016, the NCAA (the United States' primary governing body for collegiate athletics) stripped North Carolina of hosting rights for seven upcoming tournaments and championships held by the association, including early round games of the 2017 NCAA Division I men's basketball tournament. The NCAA argued that HB2 made it "challenging to guarantee that host communities can help deliver [an inclusive atmosphere]".

The Atlantic Coast Conference stated it was "committed to its mission of equality and diversity" and "in conjunction with our schools, we will continue to monitor all current events to ensure an inclusive and nondiscriminatory environment for all." On September 14, 2016, the ACC's council of presidents voted to move all neutral-site sports championships during the 2016–17 year, including the ACC Football Championship Game, out of North Carolina.

On September 30, 2016, the Board of Directors for the CIAA (the Central Intercollegiate Athletic Association), decided to move 8 Conference Championships that were based in North Carolina. The CIAA predominantly consists of Historically Black Colleges and Universities and issued a statement saying, "The CIAA's transition, beginning with the relocation of 8 championships, is the first step in demonstrating that the conference does not support laws which prevent communities from effectively protecting student-athletes and fans."

=== Music and performances ===
Several musicians and entertainers canceled shows in North Carolina in response to the law or boycotted the state until it was repealed, including Ani DiFranco, former Beatles drummer Ringo Starr, Boston, Demi Lovato, Nick Jonas, Itzhak Perlman, and Maroon 5. Bruce Springsteen canceled a performance in Greensboro, North Carolina, scheduled for April 10, expressing solidarity for the North Carolina transgender community; management for the Greensboro Coliseum Complex estimated that it lost $100,000 in concession and parking revenue.

Pearl Jam lead singer Eddie Vedder explained their decision to cancel concerts in NC, saying:

We thought we could take the money and give it to them and still play the show. But the reality is there is nothing like the immense power of boycotting and putting a strain. And it's a shame, because people are going to be affected that don't deserve it. But it could be the way that ultimately is gonna affect change, so again, we just couldn't find it in ourselves in good conscience to cross a picket line when there was a movement ...

Musical composer Stephen Schwartz did not allow Wicked to be produced in North Carolina due to the bill.

Cirque du Soleil cancelled their performances of Ovo in Greensboro and Charlotte, and announced the cancellation of Toruk's performances in Raleigh, saying they are "opposed to discrimination in any form. The new HB2 legislation passed in North Carolina is an important regression to ensuring human rights for all."

Other musicians and entertainers criticized the law but chose not to cancel shows or boycott. Cyndi Lauper turned her concert in Raleigh into an event "to build public support to repeal HB2," and committed to donating profits from the show to Equality North Carolina. Mumford and Sons performed in Charlotte but donated some of the proceeds to an LGBT organization. Laura Jane Grace, a transgender rock musician and lead singer of the punk rock band Against Me!, stated that the band would not be boycotting North Carolina but would donate money from their concert to Time Out Youth, an LGBT advocacy group. Beyoncé did not cancel her concert in Raleigh, but posted a statement on her website promoting equality and calling for fans to donate to Equality NC. She also sent out a photo of herself wearing a popular t-shirt being sold by Equality NC. The band Duran Duran performed in the state but spoke out against HB2 at their concerts.

Jimmy Buffett strongly criticized the law but said "I am not going to let stupidity or bigotry trump fun for my loyal fans this year." Alabama Shakes said they opposed the law but "We couldn't just say No, we're not showing up and I'm sorry your government is behaving this way." Brandi Carlile also spoke out against the law but chose not to cancel shows in Wilkesboro and Greensboro. Dave Matthews Band announced they would donate a portion of the proceeds from their concert scheduled in Charlotte, to five LGBT groups in an effort to repeal House Bill 2. The Lumineers announced they would protest House Bill 2 by providing gender-neutral bathrooms at their concert in Cary, North Carolina.

Noah Bendix-Balgley, the classical violinist and First Concertmaster with the Berliner Philharmoniker, spoke against House Bill 2 while performing at a concert with the North Carolina Symphony at UNC Memorial Hall in Chapel Hill. He dedicated the encore to members of the LGBT community "who currently do not feel safe or welcome in the state of North Carolina".

Selena Gomez was set to cancel her concert in Charlotte, but decided to continue with it and donate half of the proceeds from Revival Tour Charlotte to an LGBT Charity based in North Carolina, saying "I learned from an early age that everyone should be treated equally" and "I've been reassured the venue I'm performing in has gender-neutral bathrooms. I want everyone coming to my show to feel welcome."

=== Visual and literary arts ===
Author and poet Sherman Alexie canceled a book talk in Asheville because of House Bill 2. Author David Sedaris decided not to cancel a sold-out event of over 1,000 people at the University of North Carolina at Wilmington, instead deciding to donate the proceeds to Equality NC.

Eric Shiner, director of The Andy Warhol Museum, canceled a lecture he was scheduled to give to a Master of Fine Arts class at the University of North Carolina at Chapel Hill, saying he regretted having to cancel but could not go as a director of a museum who represents an iconic gay artist.

== Legal challenges ==
=== NC Attorney General does not defend the bill ===
North Carolina Attorney General and Democratic gubernatorial candidate Roy Cooper said that House Bill 2 was unconstitutional and that he would not defend it in court, but would defend state agencies against it. McCrory criticized his decision. However, Cooper was accused of opportunism for using HB2 and the corporate boycott surrounding it as leverage to boost his bid for governor against the then-incumbent Governor McCrory.

=== Private litigation ===
On March 28, 2016, the American Civil Liberties Union, the ACLU of North Carolina, Lambda Legal, and Equality North Carolina filed a lawsuit challenging House Bill 2 in the U.S. District Court for the Middle District of North Carolina (Carcaño v. McCrory). The groups argued that the law violated the Equal Protection and Due Process clauses of the United States Constitution, specifically in that it "discriminates on the basis of sex and sexual orientation and is an invasion of privacy for transgender people." On April 21, 2016, Beverly Newell and Kelly Trent, a lesbian couple from Charlotte, were added as plaintiffs after they were denied service by a fertility clinic in North Carolina. The same day, Hunter Schafer, then a transgender high school student at the University of North Carolina School of the Arts in Winston-Salem, was added as another plaintiff in the case.

On April 19, 2016, a three-judge panel of the Fourth Circuit Court of Appeals ruled in favor of transgender high school student Gavin Grimm in G.G. v. Gloucester County School Board. The ruling upheld the Department of Education's interpretation that Title IX's prohibition against discrimination on the basis of sex should be read broadly to include discrimination on the basis of gender identity. Although House Bill 2 was not at issue in Grimm's lawsuit, which originated in Virginia, the ruling has controlling status in the Fourth Circuit, which includes North Carolina. President pro tempore of the North Carolina Senate Phil Berger reacted negatively to the Fourth Circuit decision:

People need to wake up: Roy Cooper, Barack Obama and two unelected federal judges are on the verge of completing their radical social reengineering of our society by forcing middle school-aged girls to share school locker rooms with boys. House Bill 2 was our effort to stop this insanity, and I hope this proves the bathroom safety bill has nothing to do with discrimination and everything to do with protecting women's privacy and keeping men out of girls' bathrooms.

The Gloucester County School Board moved for rehearing en banc, but the Fourth Circuit declined to rehear the case, making its decision final, barring a grant of certiorari by the Supreme Court. On October 28, 2016, the Supreme Court announced that it had granted certiorari as to two of the three questions presented in a Petition for Writ of Certiorari, meaning that final disposition of the case will come from the Supreme Court.

On May 11, the conservative Alliance Defending Freedom filed a lawsuit in the U.S. District Court for Eastern North Carolina on behalf of unnamed students and parents, seeking to overturn the federal government's interpretation of federal law and to bar it from withholding federal funds.

On May 16, an ACLU lawyer appealed to U.S. District Judge Thomas D. Schroeder to suspend the law until its constitutionality can be fully evaluated. On August 26, Schroeder granted a preliminary injunction, preventing the University of North Carolina from enforcing the restroom provisions of the bill.

=== Litigation between North Carolina and the United States ===
On May 4, 2016, the United States Department of Justice notified McCrory, the North Carolina Department of Public Safety, and the University of North Carolina system that House Bill 2 violated Title VII of the Civil Rights Act and Title IX of the Education Amendments of 1972, and gave McCrory until May 9, 2016, to confirm that North Carolina would not implement or comply with the bill. Failure to comply would have resulted in a halt of billions of dollars in federal funding to the state, including $1.4 billion for the UNC system and $800 million for federally backed student loans.

McCrory and North Carolina lawmakers said the Department of Justice's intervention was orchestrated by the Obama Administration, but White House Press Secretary Josh Earnest said, "These kinds of enforcement actions are made independent of any sort of political interference or direction from the White House. Those are decisions that are made entirely by attorneys at the Department of Justice."

McCrory said that the Department of Justice received multiple requests for an extension of the deadline but told him that a one-week extension would be granted only if he conceded that the bill was discriminatory. On May 9, 2016, McCrory filed one lawsuit and Senate leader Phil Berger and House Speaker Tim Moore filed a second lawsuit against the United States, both in the Eastern District of North Carolina, seeking declaratory judgment that House Bill 2 was not discriminatory. McCrory's lawsuit, which he later withdrew on September 16, 2016, to avoid the "substantial costs" of litigating two similar lawsuits, called the Justice Department's position a "radical reinterpretation of Title VII of the Civil Rights Act".

Later on May 9, the Department of Justice filed suit against North Carolina in the Middle District of North Carolina, asking the court to stop the state from discriminating against transgender people, saying it was in violation of Title VII and the Violence Against Women Act. Attorney General Loretta Lynch described the lawsuit:

This action is about a great deal more than just bathrooms[.] This is about the dignity and respect we accord our fellow citizens, and the laws that we, as a people and as a country, have enacted to protect them – indeed, to protect all of us. It's about the founding ideals that have led this country – haltingly but inexorably – in the direction of fairness, inclusion, and equality for all Americans. This is not a time to act out of fear. This is a time to summon our national virtues of inclusivity, diversity, compassion, and open-mindedness. What we must not do – what we must never do – is turn on our neighbors, our family members, our fellow Americans, for something they cannot control, and deny what makes them human.

Margaret Spellings, then-president of the University of North Carolina, which is one of the defendants in the federal government's lawsuit, told the Department of Justice that the University "has not taken any steps to enforce [House Bill 2] on its campuses" and that it "has and will continue to comply with the requirements of Title IX, VAWA, and Title VII", but also "has an obligation to adhere to laws duly enacted by the State". The letter has been variously described as showing UNC intended to follow House Bill 2, "def[ying] the governor and legislature and [saying] it intends to act 'in compliance with federal law'", or "walk[ing] a fine line — assuring federal officials that [it will] follow federal law, while not refusing to follow HB2". On May 26, Spellings confirmed that UNC would not take any steps to enforce HB2.

== Efforts to repeal or modify ==
=== Executive Order 93 ===
On April 12, 2016, Governor McCrory signed Executive Order 93, officially called Executive Order No. 93 to Protect Privacy and Equality, regarding House Bill 2. The executive order requires all state agencies to serve all people equally when providing government services; reaffirms that private employers may, but are not required to, establish anti-discrimination policies; and reaffirms that private employers may determine their own policies regarding use of bathrooms, locker rooms, and showers based on their own policies. This includes when a private entity rents governmental facilities. In the executive order, McCrory also supported new legislation restoring a cause of action in state courts for victims of illegal employment discrimination.

Although McCrory promoted the executive order as a compromise in response to nationwide backlash, House Bill 2 remained largely intact, and companies that spoke out against the law reaffirmed their opposition.

=== House Bill 946 and Senate Bill 784 ===
On April 25, 2016, the first day back in session since House Bill 2 was passed in special session, Democratic legislators in the House of Representatives introduced House Bill 946, officially called An Act to Repeal House Bill 2 of the 2016 Second Extra Session and to Appropriate Funds to the Human Relations Commission. The bill was filed by Darren Jackson, Graig Meyer, Susi Hamilton, and Grier Martin and co-sponsored by Ed Hanes, Rosa Gill, Yvonne Holley, and Chris Sgro. As of April 25 2016, the bill had no support from Republicans, who controlled both chambers of the legislature, and a committee hearing had not yet been arranged or secured with chamber leaders.

Two days later, the Senate filed the identical Senate Bill 784. The bill was sponsored by Senators Terry Van Duyn, Jeff Jackson, and Mike Woodard, and assigned to the Senate's Ways and Means Committee.

=== House Bill 169 ===
In June 2016, WBTV obtained a copy of draft legislation to issue 'certificates of sex reassignment' to individuals who had sex reassignment surgery but were born in states that do not issue updated birth certificates following that procedure. EqualityNC opined that the draft did "nothing to restore the common sense protections passed by the Charlotte City Council earlier this year", and it did not pass. In House Bill 169, the state made only one revision, restoring residents' right to bring claims of discrimination in state courts.

=== Mediation by the private sector ===
On September 16, 2016, after working to broker a compromise with state lawmakers, the North Carolina Restaurant and Lodging Association issued a press release stating that the General Assembly would call a special session to repeal House Bill 2 if the Charlotte City Council voted to repeal Ordinance 7056 during their session on September 19. The NCRLA and the Charlotte Chamber called for both laws to be promptly repealed.

On September 19, 2016, Mayor Roberts said that the city was "not prepared" to discuss repealing Ordinance 7056 at the city council meeting scheduled for later that day. No motion was made for a repeal.

=== Mediation by Governor-elect Cooper ===
After lobbying by Governor-elect Roy Cooper, the Charlotte City Council agreed to the aforementioned arrangement, and voted 10–0 on December 19 for a repeal of the public accommodations provisions of Ordinance 7056, conditioned on the state repealing HB2 by December 31. McCrory then called a special legislative session for the purpose of repealing HB2; however, the NC Senate ultimately defeated the proposal after lawmakers learned Charlotte had not repealed the entire ordinance, even though Charlotte City Council voted again December 21 to correct the situation, also removing the requirement that the legislature also act.

=== Partial repeal ===
On March 23, 2017, the NCAA warned that North Carolina would not be selected to host championship games through 2022 unless House Bill 2 was repealed. The Association's statement, made on Twitter and disseminated to the media, prompted state lawmakers to seriously consider repealing parts of the law.

Last year, the NCAA Board of Governors relocated NCAA championships scheduled in North Carolina because of the cumulative impact HB2 had on local communities' ability to assure a safe, healthy, discrimination free atmosphere for all those watching and participating in our events. Absent any change in the law, our position remains the same regarding hosting current or future events in the state. As the state knows, next week our various sports committees will begin making championships site selections for 2018-2022 based upon bids received from across the country. Once the sites are selected by the committee, those decisions are final and an announcement of all sites will be made on April 18.

— National Collegiate Athletic Association, @NCAA

The next week, on March 28, the NCAA set a 48-hour deadline for the state to repeal the bill.

On March 30, 2017, a bill to eliminate HB2's bathroom regulations but retain other parts of the law was passed by the North Carolina legislature and signed into law by Governor Roy Cooper. The partial repeal was criticized by both conservatives and equal-rights groups. Representative Chris Sgro labeled the bill as HB 2.0, saying the bill "merely doubles down on discrimination." Sarah Gillooly, policy director of the NC ACLU, called it a "fake repeal", and the ACLU said it "would keep anti-LGBT provisions of [HB2] in place and continue to single out and target transgender people" and that they would continue to fight it in court. The Human Rights Campaign and Lambda Legal also opposed the bill.

On July 23, 2019, federal judge Thomas D. Schroeder approved the 2017 settlement, clarifying that transgender people have the right to use restrooms in state-owned buildings that match their gender identities.

=== Full repeal ===
The remainder of HB2, which barred local governments from passing anti-discrimination ordinances, was repealed on December 1, 2020, by a sunset provision, which was inserted below the partial repeal in House Bill 142, passed on March 30, 2017. A narrow provision remains on the books, which gives the North Carolina General Assembly the sole authority to pass any future regulations related to government-owned bathrooms.

In response to the full repeal on December 1, 2020, many local governments across North Carolina almost immediately enacted local laws to protect LGBT people from discrimination and other local governments are considering passing similar local laws.

== Popular opinion ==
Polls by Public Policy Polling and others have consistently found that a majority of North Carolinians say HB2 has negatively impacted the state's economy and public image, and that more Carolinians say they oppose the law than support it. In polls, residents of rural communities are more supportive of the law than those in urban areas. One poll in April 2016 and another in May found that 56% of North Carolinians supported the provision barring transgender people from using bathrooms corresponding to their gender identity. Another poll in May found that 50% want to see it repealed, while 38% think it should remain law. A pair of polls in April and May found that most North Carolinians, including a majority of women, feel the law has not made the state any safer.

By August 2016, only 30% of North Carolinians still supported HB2, and in December 2016, Public Policy Polling reported that the widespread unpopularity of HB2 was given as the dominant reason for Republican Governor Pat McCrory's defeat at the hands of Roy Cooper that year, the first time an incumbent North Carolina Governor had lost re-election since the incumbent Governor Charles Manly was defeated in 1850.

== Criticism ==
=== Public demonstrations ===
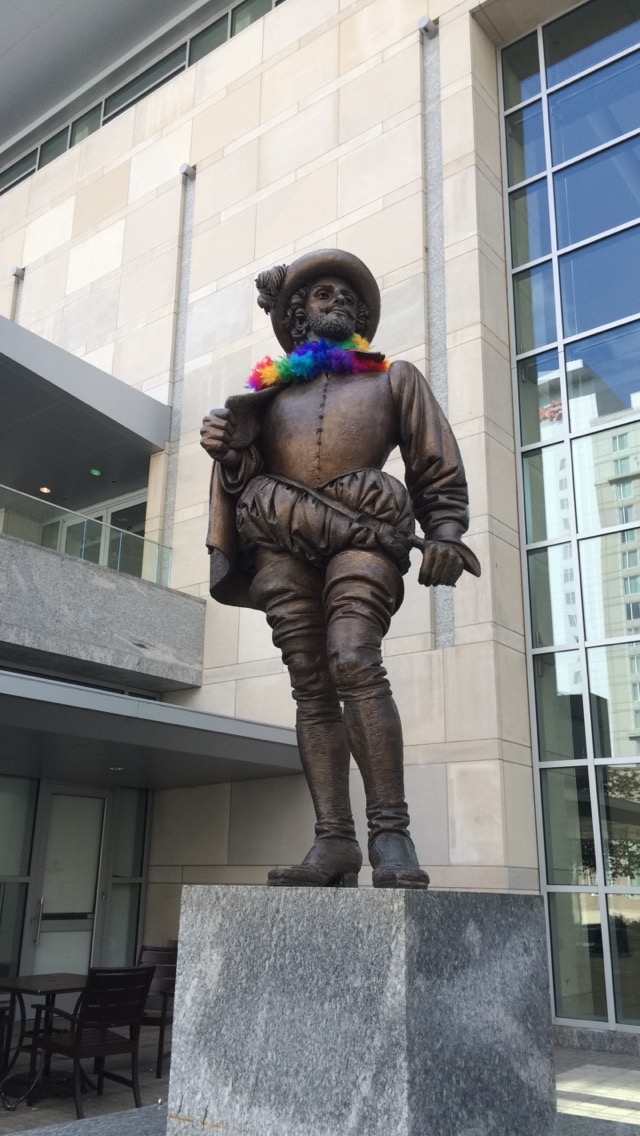
A rainbow feather boa hung over the Sir Walter Raleigh statue outside the Raleigh Convention Center in protest of House Bill 2

There were numerous rallies against House Bill 2, including in Raleigh: on March 24, hundreds of people marched through Raleigh to the North Carolina Executive Mansion, and on April 1 people protested outside the Legislative Building. There were also protests in Winston-Salem, Asheville (where 300 protesters rallied with Rev. Jasmine Beach-Ferrara, director of Campaign for Southern Equality), Burlington, and Hendersonville. On April 3, 2016, over 700 people gathered at a rally in Greensboro to protest the law.

There were demonstrations and protest actions at Salem College, High Point University, Wake Forest University, East Carolina University in Greenville, the University of North Carolina at Asheville, and the University of North Carolina at Greensboro, where the protest included a rally inside an administrative building and a march across campus to block a city intersection at Tate and Spring Garden streets in the College Hill Historic District. Another protest was held in Greensboro on April 13, 2016, on the campus of North Carolina Agricultural and Technical State University. There was also a rally at the University of North Carolina at Charlotte on April 7. Students from Warren Wilson College went to Raleigh to protest the legislation. Students at North Carolina State University and the University of North Carolina at Pembroke and at Wilmington held bathroom sit-ins.

In early April 2016, more than 100 students at Appalachian State University held a rally and week long protest against the bill in the university's administrative building. Students blocked traffic in downtown Boone as part of the protest. The group Appalachian State Student Power demanded that the University Chancellor Sheri Everts and UNC System President Margaret Spellings to publicly denounce the law.

On March 29, 2016, hundreds of people protesting House Bill 2 shut down Franklin Street in Chapel Hill, North Carolina for several hours. On April 13, a rally organized by the Queer and Trans People of Color Collective in Uptown Charlotte stopped traffic for over twenty minutes.

Some protests were part of the Moral Mondays civil disobedience movement, including one on April 25, 2016, when protesters were forced to leave their seats in the viewing gallery after loudly protesting as the House adjourned for the day. By the end of the day, fifty-four protesters were arrested: eighteen who had been arrested earlier and thirty-six more who refused to leave, including Mara Keisling, executive director of the National Center for Transgender Equality. Protesters had stood outside House Speaker Tim Moore's office and on the ground floor of the Legislative Building. 180,000 signed petitions against House Bill 2 were brought to the legislative building during the Moral Monday protests. Also on April 1, students at the University of North Carolina at Wilmington held a protest. A rally was held later that evening in Wilmington blocking traffic at the intersections of Oleander and College Roads.

At an open house at the governor's western residence in Asheville on May 14, 2016 protesters from Tranzmission, Black Lives Matter, and JustEconomics of Western North Carolina gathered to show opposition to House Bill 2.

=== Political ===
==== Local government ====
In response to the restrictions on local governance and LGBT protections, numerous North Carolina cities and municipalities passed resolutions criticizing House Bill 2. Chapel Hill, Marion, Nags Head, Duck, Durham, Winston-Salem, Wilmington, and the state capital Raleigh passed resolutions calling for the law to be repealed. Orange County also called for HB2's repeal. Greensboro, Hillsborough, Greenville, and Asheville also passed resolutions opposing the bill. Asheville Mayor Esther Manheimer called the bill an overreach and an inappropriate reaction to Charlotte's non-discrimination ordinance. Buncombe County, Chatham County, Durham County, and Wake County also approved measures expressing opposition to the law. Carrboro passed a resolution that the town would partner with other local jurisdictions and advocacy groups to take legal action against House Bill 2, calling it "discriminatory and arguably unconstitutional."

Margaret Spellings, then-president of the UNC system, has said that while public universities are obligated to follow the law, they do not endorse it. She later expressed concern that House Bill 2 might discourage prospective faculty and students from coming to North Carolina, and said she hoped the law would be changed.

==== Federal government ====
On March 28, 2016, the White House condemned the law, and on April 22, U.S. President Barack Obama, speaking in London in response to Britain's reaction to the law, called for House Bill 2 to be repealed.

On April 18, 2016, the United States Commission on Civil Rights issued a statement stating that House Bill 2 "jeopardizes not only the dignity, but also the actual physical safety, of transgender people."

==== Presidential candidates ====
Some Republican 2016 U.S. presidential candidates have publicly stated they would not have signed House Bill 2, including Ohio Governor John Kasich and businessman Donald Trump.

Kasich defended his position against the law by saying, "Why do we have to write a law every time we turn around in this country? Can't we figure out just how to get along a little bit better and respect one another?"

Speaking about the economic impact that the law has had on North Carolina, Trump said, "North Carolina did something that was very strong and they're paying a big price and there's a lot of problems"; when asked which restroom a transgender person should use in one of his buildings, he said that they should use whichever one they are most comfortable using. After becoming the presumptive nominee of the Republican Party, Trump altered his stance and supported the law on July 6 in Raleigh. Later on, he emphasized that the states should be allowed to decide on the matter, despite his personal stance.

The Democratic 2016 presidential candidates, former Secretary of State Hillary Clinton and Vermont Senator Bernie Sanders, both condemned the law.

==== Appointment of Chris Sgro ====
Approximately two weeks after the passage of House Bill 2, Chris Sgro, the leader of Equality NC, the largest LGBT advocacy organization in North Carolina, was selected to fill a vacancy in the North Carolina House of Representatives, making him the only openly LGBT member of the North Carolina General Assembly at the time. Pursuant to state law, the local Guilford County Democratic Party Executive Committee had the responsibility for filling the vacancy. Chris Sgro quickly became the most vocal opponent of House Bill 2 in the General Assembly, often publicly clashing with the governor.

=== Commercial ===
Large American corporations were a driving force behind the movement to repeal House Bill 2. Hundreds of companies publicly announced their opposition to the law. On March 29, 2016, an open letter signed by 80 corporate CEOs against House Bill 2 was sent to Governor McCrory. The law cost the state more than 1750 jobs and more than $77 million-worth of investments and visitor spending. Eleven lobbyists said legislators had told them that if they or the businesses they represent criticized House Bill 2, House and Senate leaders would not move legislation they wanted and may pass laws targeting them; legislators denied knowing anything about this.

On April 19, 2016, in response to bathroom bills in North Carolina and other states, Target announced that their customers and employees may use the bathroom or fitting room associated with their gender identity.

=== Religious groups ===
==== Christian ====
Numerous Christian institutions and clerical leaders criticized the law and called for its repeal, including the leadership of the Presbyterian Church (USA), congregations of the Religious Society of Friends, the North Carolina Synod of the Evangelical Lutheran Church in America, and a group of fourteen pastors of the Metropolitan Community Church. Four bishops of the Episcopal Church; Anne Hodges-Copple, G. Porter Taylor, Robert Skirving and Peter James Lee said it discriminated against the LGBT community, workers, and the poor. The Episcopal bishops called on North Carolina Episcopalians "to strive for justice and peace among all people, and respect the dignity of every human being", and called on the legislature to repeal the law, saying "we encourage our leaders to listen to the experiences of LGBT citizens and to seek to understand their lives and circumstances." The Alliance of Baptists also encouraged participation in a day of action against the law.

William Barber II, a Disciples of Christ minister and board member of the NAACP, also called for repeal, as did John C. Dorhauer, General Minister and President of the United Church of Christ, who said "I cannot know what the struggle is like to claim your identity in a culture like ours, where even the power of the state is brought to bear to enact discriminatory laws that embolden hatred, vitriol, and ignorance ... My outrage over this cannot be contained; I have no desire to contain it."

On April 25, 2016, the incumbent United Methodist bishops in North Carolina, Hope Morgan Ward and Larry M. Goodpaster, and the retired bishops Charlene P. Kammerer, William Henry Willimon, C. P. Minnick, Jr., Thomas Stockton, Lawrence McCleskey, and Ray Chamberlain, called for the repeal of House Bill 2, saying:

We observe the hurried passage of House Bill 2 (HB2) and its resultant harm to North Carolina – to individuals, to our economy, to our engagements with other states and nations, and to our future. We call for the repeal of HB2. ... We urge all United Methodists to engage in prayer, in study of the issues, in patient listening and persevering conversation with others who hold differing opinion, and in courageous advocacy for what is right, just and good for all people in North Carolina.

The United Methodist Women have also taken a stand against HB2 and are planning to move their Mission u training program in May 2017 from Charlotte to Jacksonville, Florida. They planned to have an action against HB2 in Charlotte in January 2017 during its Leadership Development Days training program.

Harriet Jane Olson, Chief Executive Officer of United Methodist Women, said:

Discrimination in employment and public accommodation based on sexual orientation today is no more acceptable than discrimination based on race was 75 years ago. In 1942 our predecessors stood against racial segregation and moved the Assembly from St. Louis, Missouri, to Columbus, Ohio, so that black and white members could stay in the same hotels. Today's decision is a current application of the same principle, caring for all our members, paying attention to where and how we spend their Mission Giving and standing with those who are oppressed.

Michael Francis Burbidge, bishop of the Roman Catholic Diocese of Raleigh, criticized House Bill 2 and called for a replacement of the legislation with "another remedy" that will "defend human dignity; avoid any form of bigotry; respect religious liberty and the convictions of religious institutions; work for the common good; and be discussed in a peaceful and respectful manner."

The North Carolina Council of Churches stated that House Bill 2 was "making discrimination easier in NC" and "puts us on the wrong side of the prophets who preached justice and mercy, calling on us to be better than our fears and to transcend our biases." On April 24, 2016, the council, EqualityNC and the Equality Federation brought Christian ethicist David P. Gushee, Vice President of the American Academy of Religion and President-Elect of the Society of Christian Ethics, to speak in Durham about the ethical implications of the law for people of faith.

==== Jewish ====
Forty-five rabbis signed a letter expressing "deep dismay" with House Bill 2. The letter stated,

As leaders of a faith community which has repeatedly suffered from state-sponsored discrimination and citizen-based prejudice, we will not stand idly by as our North Carolina legislature weakens the legal protections of our Lesbian, Gay, Bisexual and Transgender brothers and sisters.. The Torah teaches that all human beings are created in the image of God and imbued with infinite value. In that spirit, we declare that our state should, under no circumstance, desecrate the holiness and dignity of any citizen.

—

The Jewish Federation of Durham-Chapel Hill and Carolina Jews for Justice spoke out against the legislation. On April 10, 2016, Rabbi Stephen Roberts wrote in the Watauga Democrat that Christians and Jews alike should not support House Bill 2.

On April 26, 2016, North Carolina Jewish leaders held a news conference shortly before a Passover prayer service with lawmakers in the North Carolina State Legislative Building in Raleigh. While speaking at the conference, Rabbi Lucy Dinner of Temple Beth Or said, "HB2 targets one of the most vulnerable groups in our society and eviscerates their ability to participate actively in community."

==== Others ====
The Southeast Unitarian Universalist Summer Institute said they were saddened that House Bill 2 "places lesbian, gay, bisexual, and transgender North Carolinians at risk of physical, emotional, and legal damage. It also threatens the safety and comfort of LGBT visitors to North Carolina."

The Charlotte Clergy Coalition for Justice, an interfaith organization, announced they would financially support the plaintiffs in the Carcaño v. McCrory lawsuit challenging House Bill 2.

The Wiccan communities of North Carolina spoke out against the law, saying it was discriminatory.

=== Press ===
The Charlotte Observer, The New York Times, The Washington Post, News & Record, The News & Observer, Asheville Citizen-Times, and The Fayetteville Observer condemned House Bill 2.

On September 15, 2016, during a lunch event in Charlotte where McCrory was expected to take questions from reporters, McCrory avoided questions about House Bill 2 by instead responding to questions provided to him by his staff. The Charlotte Observer reported that three of the questions were incorrectly attributed to them. When a reporter for The Charlotte Observer tried to ask McCrory a question afterwards, he responded by saying, "We've got three Observer questions answered already. I think you guys dominate the news enough."

=== International ===
==== United Kingdom ====
On April 21, 2016, Britain's Foreign and Commonwealth Office issued a travel advisory directed at their LGBT citizens visiting the United States, specifically North Carolina and Mississippi. In it, they said, "The U.S. is an extremely diverse society and attitudes towards LGBT people differ hugely across the country. LGBT travellers may be affected by legislation passed recently in the states of North Carolina and Mississippi." The Human Rights Campaign called it "both frightening and embarrassing that one of our nation's staunchest allies has warned its citizens of the risks" of travel.

In a parliamentary answer to Labour MP Cat Smith, Foreign Office Minister Hugo Swire said the British government had expressed concerns to the authorities in North Carolina; stating, "Our Consul General in Atlanta raised our concerns with the North Carolina Commerce Secretary on 19 April ... This Government is opposed to all forms of discrimination. We are committed to ensuring that all LGBT people are free to live their lives in a safe and just environment."

==== European Union ====
On May 12, 2016, the European Union criticized North Carolina for House Bill 2, as well as Mississippi for the Religious Liberty Accommodations Act and Tennessee for SB 1556. The official statement read:

The recently adopted laws including in the states of Mississippi, North Carolina and Tennessee, which discriminate against lesbian, gay, bisexual, transgender and intersex persons in the United States contravene the International Covenant on Civil and Political Rights, to which the US is a State party, and which states that the law shall prohibit any discrimination and guarantee to all persons equal and effective protection.

As a consequence, cultural, traditional or religious values cannot be invoked to justify any form of discrimination, including discrimination against LGBTI persons. These laws should be reconsidered as soon as possible.

The European Union reaffirms its commitment to the equality and dignity of all human beings irrespective of their sexual orientation and gender identity. We will continue to work to end all forms of discrimination and to counter attempts to embed or enhance discrimination wherever it occurs around the world.

=== Advocacy groups ===
On April 21, the National Task Force to End Sexual and Domestic Violence Against Women, a coalition of over two hundred national, state, and local organizations against sexual assault and domestic violence against women, issued a statement opposing anti-transgender initiatives, writing that "discriminating against transgender people does nothing to decrease the risk of sexual assault" and noting that of the 18 states and more than 200 municipalities with anti-discrimination laws "protecting transgender people's access to facilities consistent with the gender they live every day", none "have seen a rise in sexual violence or other public safety issues due to nondiscrimination laws."

=== Public figures and others ===
Many celebrities and other public figures publicly denounced House Bill 2, including Elton John, Michael Jordan, Montel Williams, Laverne Cox, Janet Mock, Caitlyn Jenner, Chris Sacca, George Takei, Beyoncé, Ellen DeGeneres, Stephen Colbert, and Jamie Lee Curtis.

A number of arts organizations and events also called for its repeal. The Arts & Science Council of Charlotte-Mecklenburg stated that "HB2 puts our cultural sector and its role in attracting a talented workforce, creative individuals, major exhibitions and performances, educators, tourists and other cultural opportunities at risk."

== Support ==
=== Political ===
McCrory applauded the passage of House Bill 2, referring to transgender people by their assigned sex and saying the ordinance approved by Charlotte's city council had "defied common sense," despite four months earlier stating that "transgender identity is a complex issue and is best handled with reason and compassion at the local level." McCrory says news outlets critical of House Bill 2 are "distorting the truth" and "smearing [the] state." Defending House Bill 2 during a press conference, McCrory said the law did "not [take] away any rights," but his interpretation was widely disputed.

Surry County Board of Commissioners voted to sever ties with PayPal after the company pulled out of Charlotte over HB2 at their May 16, 2016 meeting.

Davidson County Board of Commissioners, Randolph County Board of Commissioners, Ashe County Board of Commissioners, Cape Carteret Board of Commissioners, Rockingham County Board of Commissioners, Stokes County Board of Commissioners, as well as Indian Beach Board of Commissioners, and Old Fort Board of Aldermen, have all signed resolutions of support for HB2.

==== Presidential candidates ====
U.S. senator and Republican presidential candidate Ted Cruz supported the bill, bringing it up frequently during campaign appearances.

On July 6, 2016, at a rally in Raleigh, North Carolina, Republican presidential candidate front-runner Donald Trump was asked by The News and Observer if he stood by his previous rejection of House Bill 2. Trump altered his stance, saying, "The state, they know what's going on, they see what's happening, and generally speaking I'm with the state on things like this. I've spoken with your governor, I've spoken with a lot of different people, and I'm going with the state."

=== Religious organizations ===
On March 28, 2016, two religious organizations, the NC Values Coalition and the Keep NC Safe Coalition, released a list of forty-one businesses which the organizations said had signed a letter of support for House Bill 2. The organizations said their list included over 300 businesses but could only publicly name forty-one of them because others were afraid of retaliation. The only national company listed, Hanesbrands, was subsequently removed after it was learned a single employee had listed the company without permission. At least one other company has been removed from the public list for similar reasons.

On May 24, 2016, forty preachers, most of whom were African-American, rallied at the State Capitol to defend House Bill 2, saying they did not view LGBT rights as civil rights. A contingent of 80 pastors and faith leaders representing North Carolina's Hispanic communities, rallied in support of HB2 at the state legislative building on June 14, 2016.

On August 10, 2016, the Church of God in Christ announced they still plan to hold their 2017 annual "Auxiliary in Ministry" or AIM conference despite HB2. The 2016 Conference accounted for $14 million in tourism to Cincinnati, Ohio.

=== Public demonstrations ===
On April 25, 2016, hundreds of supporters gathered at the Halifax Mall in downtown Raleigh. Speakers focused on the section of the law that requires people to use bathrooms in public facilities that correspond to the sex on their birth certificate and quoted biblical scripture in defense of the law. The crowd was encouraged to visit legislators' offices in show of support and to boycott Target, which had recently announced that employees and customers could use the restroom and fitting room that correspond to their gender identity. The organizations held a series of prayer vigils in Greensboro, Raleigh, Charlotte, Havelock, Greenville, New Bern, Fayetteville, Marshville and Jacksonville to show public support for HB2.

== See also ==
- House Bill 142
- State bans on local anti-discrimination laws in the United States
- Bathroom bill
- LGBT rights in North Carolina
- Robin Tanner (leading efforts to repeal HB2)
