= Cimarron Alliance Foundation =

Nonprofit organization in Oklahoma, US

- Merged into: Freedom Oklahoma
- Founded: 1995
- Dissolved: 2015
- Type: Educational Charity
- Location: 5316 North May Ave ste 400 Oklahoma City, Oklahoma 73112
- Region served: Oklahoma
- Method: Popular Education

The Cimarron Alliance Foundation was a 501(c)(3) educational organization dedicated to advocacy for Oklahoma's LGBT citizens. Its mission was “to support educational efforts that increase personal self-esteem, promote public enlightenment and advance equality for LGBT Oklahomans".

In September 2002, the group won a lawsuit against Oklahoma City after the city took down banners advocating gay and lesbian rights. Judge Robin J. Cauthron ruled that the city ordinance in question, which prohibited advocacy messages, violated the First and Fourteenth Amendments.

In 2007, they organized the state's first "all-inclusive" anti-bullying conference.

In 2015, The Cimarron Alliance Foundation merged with The Equality Network, a 501(4) organization in Tulsa, Oklahoma, that promotes equally through legal advocacy and is now a statewide organization. The merged organization is known as Freedom Oklahoma.
