= State preemption =

State legislature superseding a locality

In United States law, state preemption is the legal limitation or invalidation of some action by, or the wresting of power from, a portion of the state government (more often than not a municipality or other part of the state government that only exercises power within a certain geographical area such as a county) usually by the state legislature. Preemption is often used when there is a political disagreement between the state legislature and municipal governments. When a state enacts a law that overrides or restricts local authority, the local government is said to be preempted.

The largest division between the legislature and the local governments is typically partisan; most state legislatures have been since 2010, dominated by Republicans, and city governments are typically dominated by Democrats.

== Types of preemption ==
State preemption comes in many forms. A state that enacts a requirement but allows municipalities to pass more stringent laws is engaging in preemption; however, most controversial forms of state preemption are the opposite. In these cases, states prohibit local governments from adopting regulations that differ from or go beyond state law.

Some preemption laws contain punishments for enforcing preempted laws that include the withholding of state funds from the municipality or making officials open to lawsuits. In 2016, Arizona enacted SB 1487 (Rev. Stat. 41-194.01), which both withholds state funds and requires a large bond to challenge preempting statutes. This type of policy is sometimes referred to as punitive preemption. SB 1487 was challenged by the city of Tucson; the state supreme court stated that the bond requirement would stop municipalities from challenging statutes, but it refused to overturn that provision.

== Legal basis ==
In many states, municipalities only have powers specifically granted to them by state legislatures. (Note: This is under the framework of Dillon's rule, originally upheld by the Supreme Court of the United States in Hunter v. City of Pittsburgh (1907).) Most states have some form of home rule, which expands municipal power, but only California and Ohio protect municipalities from preemption. This protection is shrinking, since Ohio preempted cities from raising the minimum wage and charging a fee on single-use plastic bags. The Supreme Court has struck down preemption laws that had a civil rights concern, such as in Romer v. Evans (1995).

State preemption has become increasingly prominent in the 21st-century United States as state legislatures respond to policy innovation at the local level. This trend has contributed to ongoing legal and political debates over the appropriate balance of power between state and local governments.

== Examples ==
=== Firearms ===
Most states have some preemption against local firearm regulations; in 2019, the number was 43.

In 2017, Tallahassee city officials (including Mayor Andrew Gillum) were sued under Florida's punitive preemption laws; officials were not allowed to use city funds for their defense, instead having to be defended pro bono. A state appellate court ruled that, as the law was not actively enforced, it did not violate the statute.

=== LGBT anti-discrimination ordinances ===
In 1992, Colorado voters approved Amendment 2, which preempted municipal anti-discrimination laws protecting gay people. Over the next few years, similar laws were voted down in several states. (Note: Idaho (1994), Oregon (1994), and Maine (1995).) The Colorado amendment was invalidated by the Supreme Court in Romer v. Evans (1995), with the majority opinion stating that the law was "born of animosity toward the class of persons affected."

In the 2010s, three state legislatures passed laws preempting municipal anti-discrimination laws protecting trans people; (Note: Tennessee (Equal Access to Intrastate Commerce Act; 2011), Arkansas (Intrastate Commerce Improvement Act; 2015), North Carolina (Public Facilities Privacy & Security Act; 2016).) one such law, North Carolina's HB2, was repealed after national opposition.

=== Minimum wage laws ===
In 2016, the Alabama legislature enacted AL HB174, preempting local minimum wage ordinances in the state. Its passage invalidated an ordinance in the city of Birmingham that would have raised the city's minimum wage above that of the state level. After being challenged in court in 2018, the law has been upheld, reinforcing the state's authority to override local labor regulations.

=== Plastic Bag Regulations ===
On April 13th, 2015, the Arizona State Senate passed AZ SB1241 into law, prohibiting local governments from banning or regulating single-use plastic bags. The law invalidated local efforts and prevented municipalities state wide from adopting similar environmental regulations.

== See also ==
- Home rule in the United States
- Federal preemption
- Paramountcy (Canada)
