= North Carolina House Bill 142 =

2017 North Carolina law

House Bill 142 (HB 142) is a 2017 law that was enacted in the state of North Carolina that repealed House Bill 2. The bill states that all "state agencies, boards, offices, departments, institutions, branches of government, including The University of North Carolina and the North Carolina Community College System, and political subdivisions of the State, are preempted from regulation of access to multiple occupancy restrooms, showers, or changing facilities, except in accordance with an act of the General Assembly." It also enacted that no local government in this state may enact or amend an ordinance regulating private employment practices or regulating public accommodations until December 1, 2020.

== Passage ==
House Bill 142
	North Carolina House of Representatives								North Carolina Senate							
	Ayes		Noes		Excused absents		Total		Ayes		Noes		Excused absents		Total	
	#	%	#	%	#	%	#	%	#	%	#	%	#	%	#	%
Republican caucus	40	54.05%	33	44.59%	1	1.35%	118	100%	23	65.71%	10	28.57%	2	5.71%	48	100%
Democratic caucus	30	65.22%	15	32.61%	1	2.17%	118	100%	9	60%	6	40%	0	0%	48	100%
Total	70	59.32%	48	40.68%	2	1.69%	118	100%	32	66.67%	16	33.34%	2	4.17%	48	100%

On March 30, 2017, the North Carolina Senate passed HB 142, with 32 ayes, 16 noes, and 2 excused absents. That same day, the North Carolina House of Representatives passed HB 142, with 70 ayes, 48 noes, and 2 excused absents, which Governor Roy Cooper signed into law that very day, becoming Ch. SL 2017-4.

== Lawsuits ==
=== Carcaño v. Cooper ===
On July 21, 2017, the Lambda Legal and the ACLU expanded Carcaño v. Cooper to include more legal challenges and plaintiffs to House Bill 142 (HB 142). On October 18, 2017, the Lambda Legal and the ACLU announced a proposed legal settlement with the state of North Carolina.

=== United States v. State of North Carolina ===
On April 14, 2017, the United States Department of Justice issued a two-sentence court filing that said it had dropped its lawsuit against the state of North Carolina over House Bill 2, which was filed in 2016 by the Obama administration, because the North Carolina legislature had replaced House Bill 2 with House Bill 142.

== See also ==
- Public Facilities Privacy & Security Act
- State bans on local anti-discrimination laws in the United States
