= LGBTQ youth vulnerability =

Health risks to LGBTQ youth

The rainbow flag is the symbol of the LGBTQ community

Due to the increased vulnerability that lesbian, gay, bisexual, transgender and queer (LGBTQ) youth face compared to their non-LGBTQ peers, there are notable differences in the mental and physical health risks tied to the social interactions of LGBTQ youth compared to the social interactions of heterosexual youth. According to the article "Social Media: A double-edged sword for LGBTQ+ Youth", the study showed that "in comparison to cisgender youth, transgender and gender binary youth had a higher risk of depression and anxiety" from social media exposure. (Note: Fischer 5) Youth of the LGBTQ community experience greater encounters with not only health risks, but also violence and bullying, due to their sexual orientation, self-identification, and lack of support from institutions in society.

== Health studies ==
LGBTQ youth face a variety of stressors that affect their mental health. Due to society's tendency to discriminate against non-heterosexual sexual orientations and identities, members of the LGBTQ community are 3 times more likely to face mental health disorders compared to their non-LGBTQ peers. For instance, the constant fear of not being accepted after coming out to one's community can lead to an anxiety disorder, depression, PTSD, suicidal thoughts, or substance abuse. According to the National Alliance on Mental Illness (NAMI), LGBTQ teenagers “are 6 times more likely to experience symptoms of depression” than their heterosexual peers, as they are just beginning to navigate how to come out to friends, family, and other associates, while still developing into an adult.

Because of the crucial development stages youth experience before adolescence, it is more likely for mental disorder to be expressed if a stressor is presented. It was reported in 2012 that within the year, 10% of youth in America demonstrated a mood disorder, 25% presented an anxiety disorder, and 8.3% presented a substance use disorder. Also, the third leading cause of death for the 10–14 age group is suicide, and the second leading cause for those in the 15–24 age group. Out of these statistics, youth of the LGBTQ community are three times more likely to experience and report suicidality.

Some studies that have been conducted are not completely inclusive of the entire LGBTQ community because of its rapid growth and expansion. The Centers for Disease Control and Prevention (CDC) conducted a 2015 Youth Risk and Behavior Survey (YRBS), which surveyed approximately 1,285,000 lesbian, gay, or bisexual (LGB) youth out of 16,067,000 students total in grades 9 through 12 in the United States. This survey was able to provide evidence of greater physical and mental vulnerabilities among the youth of the LGBTQ community in the U.S.

The survey found that 10% of LGB students were threatened with a weapon on school property, 34% were bullied at school, 28% of LGB students were bullied electronically, and 18% experienced physical dating violence. Another 18% of LGB students had been forced to have sexual intercourse at some point. These results were successful in pointing out these vulnerabilities of LGB students; however, about 514,000 students included in the survey indicated that they were not sure of their “sexual identity.” According to the CDC, there are some evidence- and research-based actions that the school can take to help the school become a healthy place for all children: encourage respect for all children, no matter what their ethnicity or sexual orientation is, and ban bullying, harassment, or violence. Then identify "safe places" on campus for the students like a counselor's office or a designated classroom where students of the LGBTQ community can find support and feel safe, and ensure the health curriculum and sex education is up to date regarding the LGBTQ community and have HIV, STD, and pregnancy prevention information that is relevant to them.

The Human Rights Campaign conducted a survey, titled “Growing Up LGBT in America", which addresses vulnerabilities faced by about 10,000 LGBTQ youth from the ages of 13 to 17 in the United States. This survey found that 4 out of 10 youth felt that their neighborhoods weren't accepting of the LGBTQ community. 73% of youth surveyed said that they were more honest about their identity online than in person. 26% of youth identified their largest problems as being related to being out and accepted at home and/or school, while 22% of non LGBTQ youth identified their largest problems as relating to academics.

== COVID-19 impact ==
Data on COVID-19 within the LGBTQ+ community is lacking due to many national data collection systems neglecting to gather data about sexual orientation and/or gender identities.

=== U.S. systems during COVID-19 ===
40% of LGBTQ people in the U.S. work in service-industry jobs, compared to 22% of non-LGBTQ people. Compared to non-LGBTQ people, LGBTQ people are 5% more likely to lack access to health insurance (17% vs. 12%), and are 6% more likely to face poverty (22% vs. 16%). Same-sex parents and single LGBTQ parents and their families are at least twice as likely to experience poverty compared with their non-LGBTQ counterparts. This suggests that LGBTQ people are particularly vulnerable to changes in financial, employment, and health-insurance statuses as a result of the COVID-19 pandemic.

=== Illness predispositions in sexual & gender minorities ===
People who classify as a sexual minority have been shown to have significantly higher rates of underlying conditions that can lead to severe COVID-related illnesses and death. These include stroke (4.7%), kidney disease (4.7%), heart disease (8.0%), cancer (9.2%), chronic obstructive pulmonary disease (10.3%), diabetes (12.5%), asthma (13.8%), smoking (22.1%), obesity (34.1%), and hypertension (35.7%). High rates of mental health conditions in sexual and/or gender minorities are likely to lead to poor COVID-related physical outcomes, healthcare utilization, and treatment adherence.

=== Youth in schools ===
An estimated one third of LGBTQ youth experience rejection by their parents. Suicide and depression are more likely among LGBTQ youth (8 and 6 times, respectively) who are rejected by their parents compared to their non-LGBTQ peers. School shut downs during the pandemic may have confined LGBTQ youth to traumatic environments. LGBTQ youth, especially LGBTQ youth who are also members of racial and ethnic minorities, homeless, undocumented immigrants, or from backgrounds of low socioeconomic status, who use school-provided mental health services were also put at risk.

== Differences in vulnerability among subgroups ==
Diversity exists within the LGBTQ community, and the community may be more accepting of some members than others. LGBTQ youth that are also racial and ethnic minorities may be met with prejudice by white members of the LGBTQ community. Additionally, LGBTQ youth may be rejected by their own racial and ethnic communities. Some communities of color may not be accepting of LGBTQ youth because homosexuality is seen as a reflection of the ideals of white, urban society. LGBTQ youth of color may also struggle to integrate their identity because their religious beliefs. For example, many members of the Latinx community practice Catholicism – a religion that has historically considered homosexuality to be a sin.

Bisexual individuals can also face rejection from other members of the LGBTQ community, sometimes in the form of biphobia. Homophobia has resulted in our society dichotomizing sexual orientation (homosexual or heterosexual) rather than viewing sexual orientation as a variable social construct.

Transgender individuals have a gender identity that does not match their biological sex and can belong to any sexual orientation. Broadly, transgender individuals are victimized at higher rates than lesbian, gay, and bisexual youth, and they also have worse mental health outcomes.

=== Mental health issues among gender minority youth ===
Transgender youth aged 12–29 have been shown to be 3 times more likely to present a depression or anxiety diagnosis, suicidal ideation, or suicide attempt. They are also 4 times more likely to engage in self-harm compared to cisgender youth. A study amongst Canadian transgender youth found that there was 5 times the risk of suicidal thoughts among transgender 14–18 year olds, with almost two-thirds having considered suicide in the past year. Compared to less than one in five students in the general population, three-quarters of 14–18 year olds reported self-harming in the past year. These youth present worse symptomatology than lesbian, gay, or bisexual youth. Non-binary youth consistently presented the worst mental health on average, according to the survey.

== Preventing poor mental health outcomes for LGBTQ youth ==
In general, people should avoid making derogatory comments about LGBTQ identities, especially around young people–even if there are no out LGBTQ people who can hear it–because these remarks can harm the mental health of youth who are closeted or do not know they are LGBTQ yet. When possible, adults should make positive comments about LGBTQ people, so that children know they will be supported no matter how they identify.

=== School districts ===
Schools should enact anti-discrimination regulations for LGBTQ students. School administrators should create safe communities for students and staff to work openly. Districts and staff should conduct trainings to ensure cultural competency in teaching LGBTQ youth and protecting against LGBTQ-related bullying incidents.

=== School counselors ===
School counselors should be educated on the issues LGBTQ students face and be aware of their own biases. School counselors should not assume that students are heterosexual, and it is important for them to use gender neutral language when asking students about their relationships. School counselors can display LGBTQ books as well as posters to signal to students that their office is a safe space. School counselors can also provide psychoeducation to school faculty and administrators on risk of victimization among LGBTQ students and advocate for the safety of all students.

=== Leaders in schools and communities ===
Schools are encouraged to address bullying proactively and educate students on anti-bullying policies. If policies are not already in place, schools should enact policies that prohibit harassment. Schools should have GSA to support LGBTQ students as well as promote a more accepting school climate. School and community leaders should make programs for LGBTQ youth available in the community, and can reach out to groups such as the Trevor Project for education on such topics.

LGBTQ community centers can help provide LGBTQ youth with a support network. Youth who participate in programs at these centers tend to have better mental health, better self esteem, and lower rates of substance abuse. These community centers can provide critical support to homeless LGBTQ youth, who are undeserved and often do not have other ways to access the resources and services that they need. As of 2024, 67% of LGBTQ community centers in the Unite.d States have programs tailored specifically for LGBTQ youth.

=== Parents ===
Parents are also encouraged to take a proactive approach and let their children know they are loved regardless of their sexual orientation or gender identity. When children do come out as LGBTQ, parents should react with support.

==== Gender-affirming hormone therapy ====
Gender-affirming hormone therapy (GAHT) involves taking hormone-blockers or supplementing hormones, such as testosterone or estrogen, in order to prevent the development of physical characteristics related to the sex assigned at birth and/or induce physical characteristics of the desired sex.

A 2-year study on gender dysphoric adolescents showed that puberty blockers significantly decreased depression and increased overall mental functioning. A follow-up study revealed that the same population which went on to receive GAHT and/or sexual reassignment surgery reported that their gender dysphoria was resolved, general psychological function improved, and sense of well-being had no significant differences from the general population. A survey of transgender and nonbinary youth found that GAHT was associated with lower chance of depression and serious suicidal ideation in comparison to those who did not receive GAHT.

Also, significantly lower likelihood of life-time suicidal ideation was found in transgender adults who had been treated with puberty blockers in adolescence compared to those who had not.

== Media ==
Online platforms have become a way to communicate common, and uncommon, standpoints globally. Hashtags and campaigns are present methods of spreading the word about public issues and topics. As the LGBTQ community uses online platforms to interact with society and run campaigns that advocate for the community, it embraces vulnerability in order to overcome it.

National Coming Out Day takes place on October 11 and is a day for LGBTQ individuals to willingly disclose their sexual orientation or identity. This can take place in many ways that include, but are not limited to, social media announcements and coming out to close family members. Because of current technology platforms that allow for social networking, much of National Coming Out Day can be observed on sites such as Facebook, Twitter, Instagram, and YouTube. The Human Rights Campaign has conducted a survey tracking the impact of National Coming Out Day in the United States. 91% of LGBTQ youth who participated in the survey came out to close friends and reported more overall happiness as they continued to live in their communities and interact with friends, family, and classmates.

Although discrimination and hateful comments have been made toward LGBTQ+ youth on social media, there have also been positive outcomes to social media youth for many LGBTQ+ teens. In one instance, an individual explained that through "using social media I was able to discover my identity and learn that I am not weird or gross or disgusting for how I feel". (Note: Fischer 3) LGBTQ+ youth have been able to find a community, confide in others, and feel less alone. Social media has made it "easier to find LGBTQ people online than offline, and it's safer too.', wrote a gender nonbinary youth". (Note: Fischer 4) Social media has connected LGBTQ+ youth individuals to each other that is comfortable for many.

Another holiday that was created to celebrate The LGBTQ community and is celebrated in the month of October is called LGBTQ History Month, created in October 1994 by Rodney Wilson, the first openly gay teacher in Missouri. In 2009, U.S. president Barack Obama officially made it a National History Month, dedicating to learning about LGBTQ rights, expressing openness, and celebrating the LGBTQ community. There are other countries besides the United States that honor the month such as The United Kingdom, Hungary, Brazil, Canada, and Australia.

A similar initiative taken online in the LGBTQ community is International Transgender Day of Visibility. This day takes place on March 31 and recognizes transgender individuals in an effort to empower those who identify as transgender in the LGBTQ community. Rachel Crandell founded this day in 2009 and it has since fought against “cissexism” and “transphobia.” Initiatives like National Coming Out Day and the International Transgender Day of Visibility are public reminders of the potential social media holds in educating the masses and raising awareness of the LGBTQ community.

== Support organizations ==
- Audre Lorde Project (U.S.)
- Boston Alliance of Gay, Lesbian, Bisexual, and Transgender Youth (U.S.)
- Gay Youth (U.S.)
- GLSTN (U.S.)
- IGLYO (International)
- Israel Gay Youth (Israel)
- It Gets Better Project (U.S.)
- The Keith Haring Foundation (U.S.)
- Queer Youth Network (UK)
- Rainbow Youth (New Zealand)
- Rainbow Youth Project (U.S.)
- Supporting Our Youth (Canada)
- The Trevor Project (U.S.)

== See also ==
- Journal of LGBT Youth
- Index of youth articles
- LGBTQ psychology
- Suicide among LGBTQ people
- Youth rights
