= Freedom Oklahoma =

LGBTQ political advocacy organization in Oklahoma, U.S.

- Logo

- U.S. State of Oklahoma
- Formation: 2015; 11 years ago
- Merger of: Cimarron Alliance Equality Center and The Equality Network
- Type: 501(c)(3) nonprofit
- Tax ID no.: EIN 45-5405020
- Purpose: LGBTQ rights advocacy
- Location: Oklahoma City, OK
- Region served: Oklahoma
- Website: www.freedomoklahoma.org

Freedom Oklahoma is a political advocacy organization in the U.S. state of Oklahoma that advocates for lesbian, gay, bisexual, and transgender (LGBTQ) rights, including same-sex marriage.

== History ==
Freedom Oklahoma was formed in 2015 with the merger of Cimarron Alliance Equality Center and The Equality Network. Cimarron Alliance's executive director at the time of the merger, Troy Stevenson, became the executive director of the new organization.

== Activities ==
Freedom Oklahoma organizes efforts to defeat legislations considered harmful to the state's LGBTQ community, and promotes positive LGBTQ legislation. The organization also supports same-sex marriage.

The organization's Equality Run promotes the Freedom Oklahoma's work and raises funds to support the organization.

The organization is a member of the Equality Federation.

== See also ==
- LGBTQ rights in Oklahoma
- List of LGBTQ rights organizations
- Same-sex marriage in Oklahoma
