= LGBTQ grooming conspiracy theory =

Conspiracy theory alleging child grooming by LGBTQ people

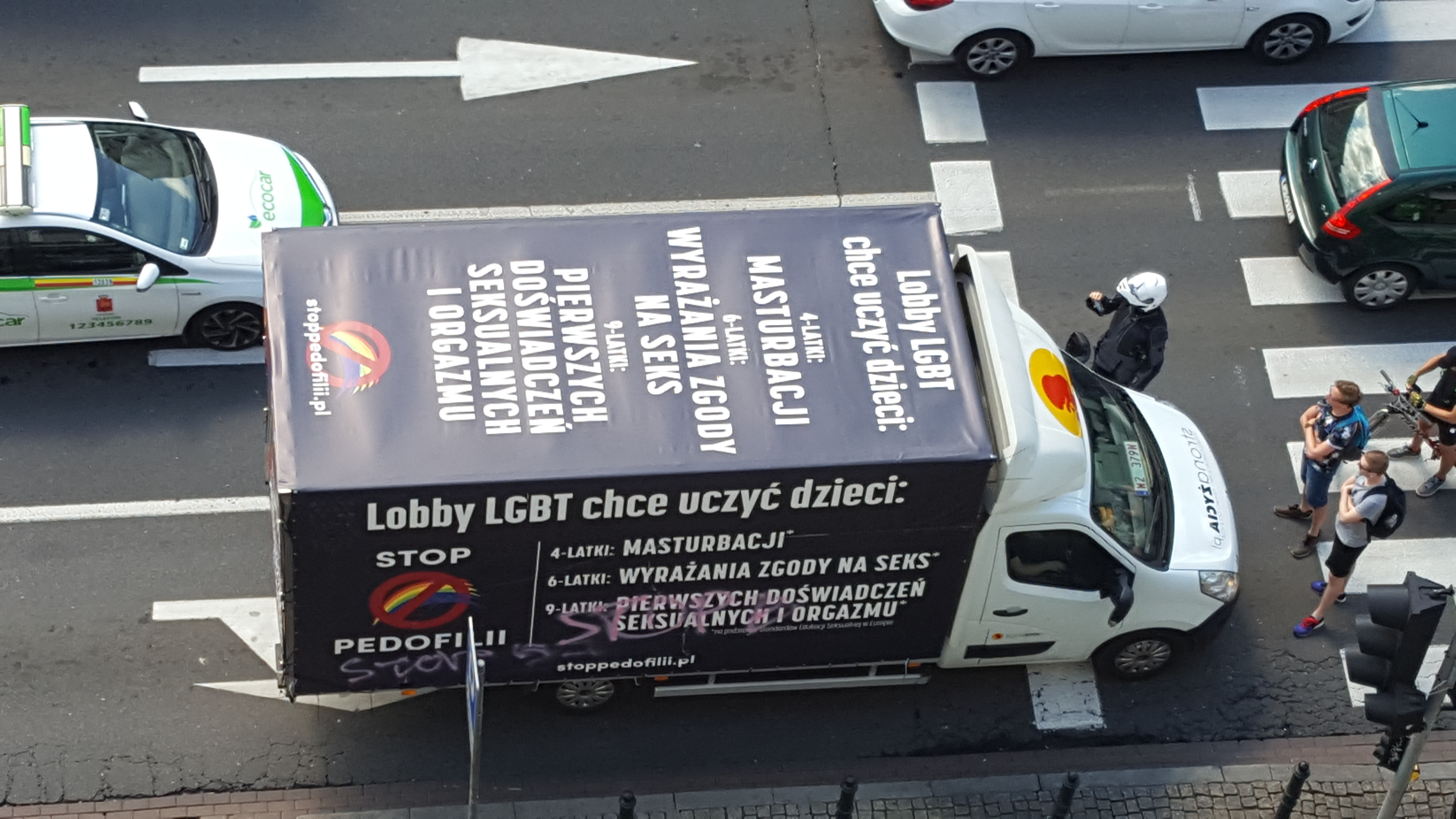
"Stop Pedofilii" van claiming that pedophilia is advocated by the "LGBT lobby"

The LGBTQ grooming conspiracy theory is a far-right conspiracy theory and anti-LGBTQ trope which alleges that LGBTQ people, and those supportive of LGBTQ rights, are engaging in child grooming and enabling child sexual abuse. Although the belief that LGBTQ individuals are more likely to molest children has no factual basis, this stereotype has existed for decades in the United States and Europe, dating back to before World War II.

The specific use of the term groomer as a slur to refer to LGBTQ people (particularly trans people and drag queens) became more prominent during partisan political campaigning in the 2020s, where it was often used to justify anti-LGBTQ curriculum bills. Despite originating with the far-right, the conspiracy theory regarding the supposed sexual grooming of children has been pushed by a growing number of mainstream conservatives, especially in the United States. The conspiracy theory has since spread among conservatives in other countries, including Australia, Canada, France, Ireland, New Zealand and the United Kingdom.

The Southern Poverty Law Center characterizes this trope as an anti-LGBTQ myth. Aja Romano of Vox labels these ideas a moral panic. There is no reliable evidence that sexual minorities are more likely to abuse children. Advocates for children's rights have protested that the conspiracy theories make it difficult for survivors of childhood sexual abuse to access resources and help. LGBTQ rights organizations have condemned the use of such notions as encouraging discrimination in the United States, the United Kingdom, Russia, Hungary, Uganda, and elsewhere.

== Overview ==
Arising in the 1980s, the term groomer refers to child grooming and became popularized through abuse survivor advocacy, initially applying to actual criminal behavior without reference to U.S. politics. The use of groomer (or pro-groomer) to refer to LGBT people (and trans people in particular) became more prominent in the early 2020s, often in the wake of anti-LGBT curriculum bills.

As described by Vox in an April 2022 report, "Conservatives use it to imply that the LGBTQ community, their allies, and liberals more generally are pedophiles or pedophile-enablers". LGBT+-inclusive education is often targeted, with the argument that it seeks to indoctrinate children into homosexuality. Its modern usage taps into older forms of anti-LGBT+ prejudice such as the homosexual seduction theory, the acquired homosexuality theory, the Lavender Scare, and certain kinds of social contagion. Transgender people and drag queens in particular have received targeted attacks using or alluding to the trope, whereas the older theories tended to target gay men.

There is no reliable evidence that sexual minorities are more likely to abuse children. American conservatives have pushed the purported link in popular culture over multiple decades going back to the times before World War II. At the beginning of the Cold War, for example, the U.S. government sought to remove homosexuals from positions of importance during the Lavender Scare. This trope became more widespread as a result of partisan political campaigning in the 2020s. The allegation that having an LGBT identity causes or otherwise contributes to pedophilia has continued as a matter of ideological faith into the 21st century, manifesting after 2019 as the "groomer slur" in particular.

One survey by Courier Newsroom, a left-leaning think tank, found that 55 percent of likely American voters oppose the conspiracy theory, while 29 percent believe it. Results were divided greatly on the basis of political party.

== History ==
=== Origins ===
Writing at Intelligencer, columnist James Kirchick argues that the grooming conspiracy theory grew out of more generalized homophobic conspiracy theories which originated in Germany in the early 20th century, in particular the Eulenburg affair. The affair received wide publicity and is often considered the biggest domestic scandal of Imperial Germany. It led to one of the first major public discussions of homosexuality in Germany, comparable to the trial of Oscar Wilde in England.

=== 19th century ===
Scientific research began to explore the causes of homosexuality in the second half of the nineteenth century. Around 1850, French psychiatrist Claude-François Michéa and German physician Johann Ludwig Casper independently suggested that homosexuality was caused by a physical difference from heterosexuals; the exact nature of this purported physical difference became a sought-after target of medical research. At the same time, many psychiatrists believed that homosexuality was a product of environmental factors such as bad habits or seduction by older men.

=== 20th century ===
==== Interwar period: 1920s to 1930s ====
After World War I, a rise in the visibility of LGBT+ people in Germany led to an increase in the belief that there was an increase in the incidence of homosexuality among young men due to recruitment by adult gay and bisexual men. By the 1920s, backlash from psychologists and psychiatrists against tolerance of LGBT+ people in Berlin suggested that homosexuality was a social contagion. The SS newspaper Das Schwarze Korps argued that 40,000 homosexuals were capable of "poisoning" two million men if left to roam free.

Susanna Cassisa argues that this panic led to efforts, in 1929, to legalize same sex activities for men, but only for those over 21, thus "enshrining in the nation's penal code the unfounded belief that gay men were seducers of youths". After the fall of the Weimar Republic, the Nazis promoted the idea that homosexuals seduced young men, permanently infecting them with homosexuality and preventing the youth from becoming fathers.

In the USSR in 1933, Article 121 was added to the entire Soviet Union criminal code, making male homosexuality a crime punishable by up to five years in prison with hard labor. Though the precise reason for Article 121 is in some dispute among historians, government statements made about the law tended to confuse homosexuality with pedophilia. The law remained intact until after the dissolution of the Soviet Union when it was repealed in 1993 by the Russian Federation.

==== Post-war period: 1945–1957 ====
In the post-war period, similar sentiments emerged in the USA; 21 states and the District of Columbia enacted laws between 1947 and 1955 which targeted gay and bisexual men as "sexual psychopaths". Many of these statutes conflated homosexuality with pedophilia.

As part of the anti-communist "Lavender Scare", the 1950 Hoey committee wrote to and interviewed medical personnel to ascertain, among other things, whether homosexual people would seduce younger men and women. The committee's final report, Employment of Homosexuals and Other Sex Perverts in Government, included the accusation that homosexuals were a risk to younger people and that, "One homosexual can pollute a Government office."

By 1952, the first Diagnostic and Statistical Manual of Mental Disorders, published by the American Psychiatric Association, officially classified homosexuality as a "sociopathic personality disturbance." In her investigation into the Lavender Scare in Prologue Magazine, Judith Adkins claimed this framing contributed to increased persecution and prejudice in the following decades.

==== 1958–1965 ====
In 1958 to 1965, the Florida Legislative Investigation Committee, which had previously fought desegregation and attempted to investigate suspected communists, targeted LGBT+ people in Florida schools, arguing they were converting children to a homosexual lifestyle. Hugh Ryan has argued that it was common for racist groups to move onto LGBT+ people, under the guise of protecting children, when their campaigns against black people failed, saying, "They realize that this works, that this is the issue that will create a 'political moral majority.'"

In 1961, the dramatic short social guidance propaganda film Boys Beware was released in the Los Angeles suburb of Inglewood, California through Sid Davis Productions with the cooperation of the city's police department and the Inglewood Unified School District. The film was narrated by a police detective on his way to a school meeting to discuss the issue of sexual predators who attempt to lure adolescent males. It attempted to educate about an alleged danger to young boys from predatory homosexuals.

==== 1970s ====
In 1977, Anita Bryant and the Save Our Children coalition also alleged that homosexuality was harmful to children, while they were attempting to repeal an ordinance that partly banned discrimination based on sexuality. Bryant claimed "homosexuals cannot reproduce, so they must recruit ... the youth of America". Shortly afterward, the failed Briggs Initiative sought to ban gay and lesbian teachers from working in California's public schools on the premise that their sexuality would "adversely affect students". Of Bryant, Hugh Ryan said, "they've already realized that they can harness this political conservatism and attach it to religion by talking about the family."

The co-executive directors of the National Gay Task Force later wrote an ironic thank you to Bryant; claiming her "Christian crusade" had drawn attention to the plight of LGBT+ people, they said Save Our Children were "doing the 20 million lesbians and gay men in America an enormous favor: They are focusing for the public the nature of the prejudice and discrimination we face."

==== 1980s ====
By 1981, Lou Sheldon, who described homosexuality as a "deathstyle," founded the Traditional Values Coalition (TVC) in the US. He suggested that grooming children was the real "homosexual agenda," saying, "They want our preschool children. [...] They want our kindergarten children. [...] They want our middle school and high school children." Sheldon later reportedly told columnist Jimmy Breslin in 1992, "Homosexuals are dangerous. They proselytize. They come to the door, and if your son answers and nobody is there to stop it, they grab the son and run off with him. They steal him. They take him away and turn him into a homosexual."

Similar sentiments were also espoused in the UK, with sex and relationships education seen as a route for LGBT+ people to groom children. In 1986, The Sun described the children's book Jenny Lives with Eric and Martin as a "vile" and "perverted" threat to British children. Of the incident, Colin Clew wrote, "To the British media, it was nothing more than a homosexual recruiting manual that sought to undermine Western civilisation as we know it."

In the run-up to the 1987 UK election, both the right-wing media and the Conservative Party had begun increasingly criticizing the Labour Party for supporting minorities such as LGBT+ people over the white, heterosexual majority. They referred to the pro-LGBT+ policies of Labour politicians and Labour-run local councils as proof they were part of a "loony left" intent on destroying British values. The Conservative election campaign featured a row of men wearing badges with slogans such as "gay pride" and "gay sports day"; underneath, the advert said, "This is Labour's camp. Do you want to live in it?" Recounting the period, writer Matthew Todd argued that, "Thatcher presided over and took advantage of the most devastatingly homophobic time in recent British history" with the help of The Sun editor Kelvin MacKenzie, amounting to "a campaign of deeply unpleasant propaganda".

During a 1987 debate for Section 28, Dame Jill Knight of Collingtree said in Parliament, "Millions outside Parliament object to little children being perverted, diverted or converted from normal family life to a lifestyle which is desperately dangerous for society and extremely dangerous for them." Section 28 proposed a ban on local authorities "[promoting] the teaching in any maintained school of the acceptability of homosexuality as a pretended family relationship", and came into effect the year after Knight's speech, in 1988.

Likewise, Deirdrie Wood, Labour candidate in the 1987 Greenwich by-election, came to be known in the press as "Dreadful Deirdrie". Labour presented her as "a hard-working local woman with sensible policies", but the press portrayed her as a radical extremist by association, as an Irish Republican Army sympathiser living with a militant shop steward who was not the father of her children, and as a "hard left feminist, anti-racist and gay-rights supporter" (as one News of the World report put it) who wanted to twin London schools with Palestine Liberation Organization camps.

=== 21st century ===
==== 2000s ====
In 2009, Timothy Matthews suggested that the Frankfurt School had as one of its aims the teaching of "sex and homosexuality to children". In the article (written from an explicitly Christian right perspective) in the Catholic weekly newspaper The Wanderer, he claimed the Frankfurt School was working under the influence of Satan, to destroy the traditional Christian family using critical theory and Marcuse's concept of "polymorphous perversity", thereby encouraging homosexuality and "merging or reversing the sexes or sex roles" in order to break down the patriarchal family. In response, Andrew Woods wrote that the plot Matthews describes does not resemble the Frankfurt School so much as the alleged aims of communists in The Naked Communist by W. Cleon Skousen. (Note: Matthews' article accused the Frankfurt School of having eleven primary aims: 1. The creation of racism offences; 2. Continual change to create confusion; 3. The teaching of sex and homosexuality to children; 4. The undermining of schools' and teachers' authority; 5. Huge immigration to destroy identity; 6. The promotion of excessive drinking; 7. Emptying of churches; 8. An unreliable legal system with bias against victims of crime; 9. Dependency on the state or state benefits; 10. Control and dumbing down of media; 11. Encouraging the breakdown of the family)

==== 2010s ====
In 2010, after analyzing Proposition 8 voting patterns, David Fleischer (author of "The Prop. 8 Report") cited anti-LGBT+ advertising that depicted children acquiring homosexuality at school. The advert depicted a young girl encouraged by her school to marry a same-sex partner; Fleisher felt adverts such as this were instrumental in persuading parents to vote to ban same-sex marriage.

On June 30, 2013, Russian President Vladimir Putin signed into law a bill banning the "propaganda of nontraditional sexual relations" among minors, which prohibits the equation of same-sex and straight marital relationships. Vice News claims that many LGBT rights groups have been transformed "from being a stigmatized fringe group to full-blown enemies of the state" in Russia following the introduction of this law, and that openly homophobic and neo-Nazi groups such as Occupy Pedophilia have been described by Russian authorities as "civil movements fighting the sins of society".

Since 2019, protesters have targeted drag queen story hour events at public facilities and private venues, often accusing performers and organizers of trying expose children to sexualized content. This included a petition by almost 100,000 Christians to the American Library Association, calling for the cancellation of drag queen story hour events.

==== 2020s ====
In the United Kingdom, the conspiracy theory began to be popularized within the gender-critical movement around 2020. That year, anti-transgender activist Graham Linehan was banned from Twitter after he began to use OK groomer as a term of abuse against those who criticized his activism. The term OK groomer originated in 2020 as a play on OK boomer.

The groomer trope was also used by the pressure group Transgender Trend in material it sent to schools in order to oppose the advice provided by LGBT+ charities such as Stonewall. In March 2020, The Times columnist Janice Turner accused the charity Mermaids, which offers support for trans youth, of grooming for introducing an exit button on their website in response to the COVID-19 pandemic lockdown.

The conspiracy has been used by the far-right in the UK, including Tommy Robinson, according to Hope not Hate, but it has also entered mainstream conservative discourse. Self-described "reactionary feminist" Mary Harrington, a contributing editor at UnHerd, defended the term groomer and denounced "preschool porn evangelism".

In 2022, the groomer slur, and OK groomer in particular, became popular among Americans who also supported Florida Governor Ron DeSantis' controversial curriculum law, commonly called the "Don't Say Gay" law by its critics. Proponents of the Florida law and others like it, which seek to curtail or diminish LGBT-inclusive content in classrooms, have described those opposed to the law as "groomers". For example, The American Conservative's senior editor Rod Dreher labeled the Walt Disney Company's opposition to the Florida law as "pervy" in his article "Disney Goes Groomer".

Research from the Harvard Law School's Cyber Law Clinic, tracking use of the phrase OK groomer on Twitter, noted that its use began to surge in early 2022, reaching a peak of 7,959 mentions on March 29 of that year, one day after the Florida bill became law.

== Popularization ==
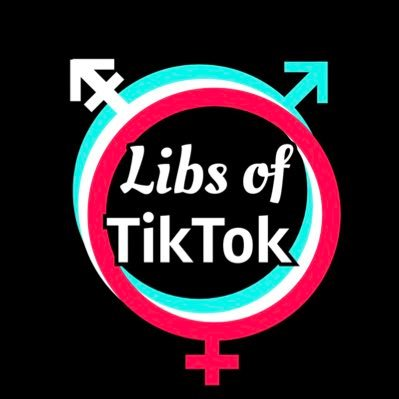
Far-right anti-LGBT Twitter account Libs of TikTok often slurs LGBT people as "groomers".

In the United States, the popularization of the term has been linked to Christopher Rufo, who tweeted about "winning the language war", and James A. Lindsay in August 2021.

Following the Wi Spa controversy in July 2021, Julia Serano noted a rise in false accusations of grooming directed towards transgender people, saying that it appeared as if there was a movement to "lay the foundation for just smearing all trans people as child sexual predators".

Libs of TikTok (LoTT) also slurs LGBT people, supporters of LGBT youth, and those who teach about sexuality as "groomers". In 2021, LoTT made false claims that the Trevor Project was a "grooming organization" and that Chasten Buttigieg was "grooming kids". LoTT creator Chaya Raichik said on the Tucker Carlson Today show that LGBT people "Want to groom kids. They're recruiting."

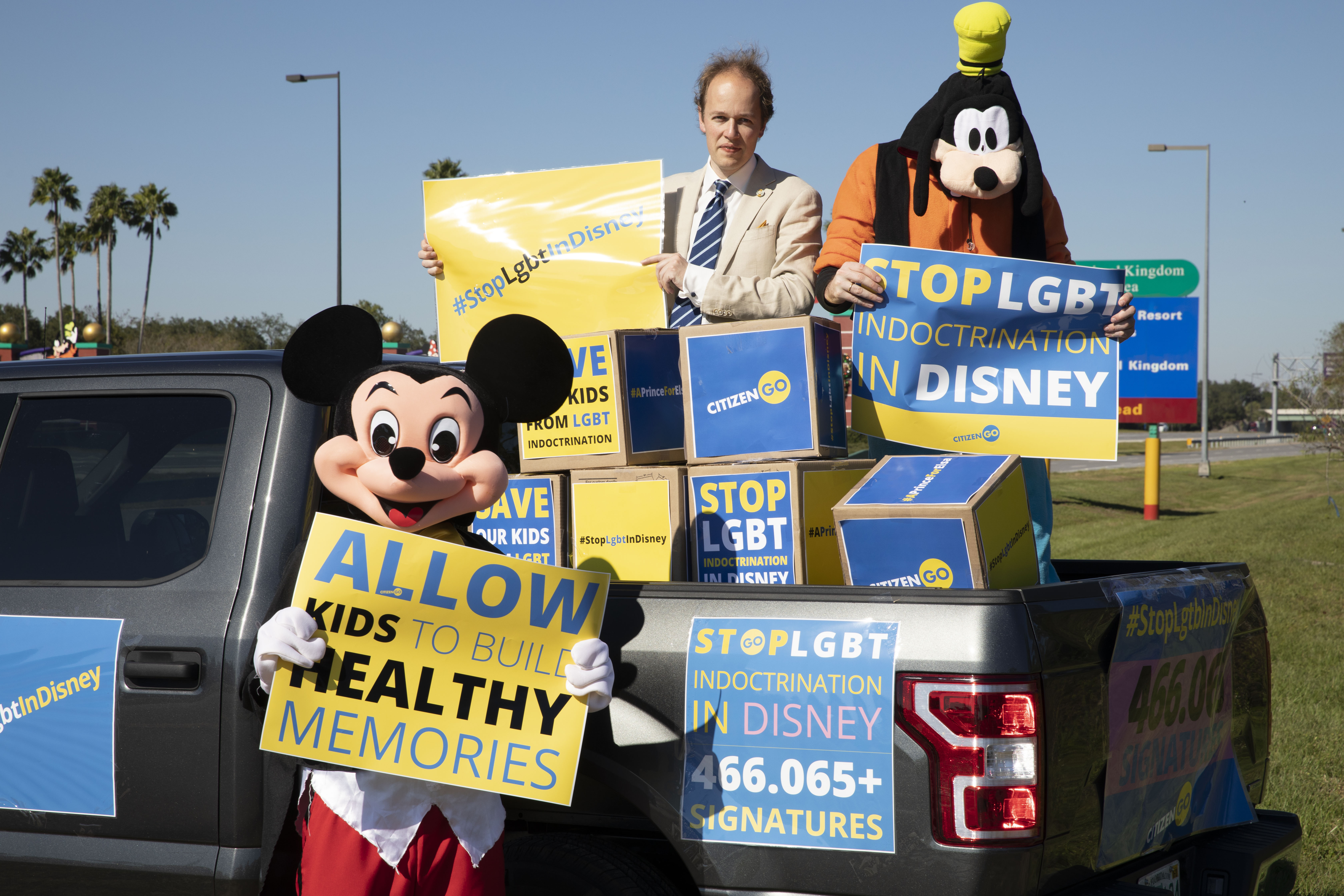
Anti–Walt Disney protest campaign by CitizenGo (2019)

The conspiracy theory then moved into the American conservative mainstream, with a number of high-profile cases of its use in Spring 2022, including its use by members of the Republican Party. On February 24, the right-wing The Heritage Foundation issued a tweet stating that the Florida Parental Rights in Education Act "protects young children from sexual grooming". During the debate over the act, Christina Pushaw, press secretary to the state's governor Ron DeSantis, tweeted that anyone who opposes the act was "probably a groomer".

In April 2022, Marjorie Taylor Greene referred to the Democratic Party as "the party of killing babies, grooming and transitioning children, and pro-pedophile politics". Also that month, a group of far-right extremists and conspiracy theorists held a demonstration at Disney World in which they accused Disney of grooming. Disney has been the focus of several other uses of the conspiracy – Jim Banks and 19 other members of the Republican Study Committee published a letter to Disney accusing the corporation of "purposefully influencing small children with its political and sexual agenda".

Gays Against Groomers (GAG) formed in June 2022. They are an American anti-LGBT organization with a large presence on social media platforms and frequent promotion on right-wing media networks. The Anti-Defamation League stated that "GAG peddles dangerous and misleading narratives about the LGBTQ+ community, focusing on false allegations of 'grooming' by drag performers".

Since then, numerous right wing pundits have described the behavior of parents and teachers who support minors in their transgender identities as grooming, and the term groomer has widely been used by conservative media and politicians who want to denounce the LGBT community and its allies by implying that they are pedophiles or pedophile-enablers. Slate Magazine later described the word grooming as "the buzzword of the season".

In March 2022, Fox News host Laura Ingraham claimed that schools were becoming "grooming centers for gender identity radicals", dedicating an entire segment of her show to the topic a couple of weeks later. In April 2022, the left-leaning media watchdog Media Matters published a study stating that within a three-week period spanning from March 17 to April 6, Fox News ran 170 segments on trans people, throughout which the network "repeatedly invoked the long-debunked myth that trans people pose a threat to minors and seek to groom them".

In June 2022, members of the far-right group Proud Boys disrupted a Drag Queen Story Hour at San Lorenzo Library in California, shouting insults like "groomer".

In August 2022, a joint report published by the American Human Rights Campaign and the British Center for Countering Digital Hate revealed that the 500 most influential hateful "grooming" tweets were seen 72 million times, and it also stated that "grooming" tweets from just ten influential sources were seen 48 million times. It also revealed that Meta, formerly known as Facebook, had accepted up to $24,987 for advertisements which pushed the grooming conspiracy theory. The advertisements had been served to users over 2.1 million times, and Twitter, despite saying that groomer slurs were violations of its hate speech policy, failed to act on 99% of tweets which were reported as such. The report also recorded a 406% increase in the use of tweets associating members of the LGBT community with being "groomers", "pedophiles", and "predators" following the passage of Florida's Parental Rights in Education Act, called the "Don't Say Gay Law" by its critics.

Also in August 2022, Jamestown, Michigan voted to defund Patmos Library, the town's only public library, over accusations of "grooming" children and promoting an "LGBTQ ideology".

In January 2023, Emma Nicholson, Baroness Nicholson of Winterbourne wrote to Tate Britain to complain about a proposed Drag Queen Story Hour event, saying drag was "adult sexualised entertainment" and that the event was propaganda for "queer ideology". When the event took place, in February, white nationalist hate group Patriotic Alternative led 30 people in demonstrating outside Tate Britain. The protesters held signs saying "groom dogs not children"; they were opposed by Stand Up to Racism. The protest turned violent with one protestor arrested for making racially aggravated comments to a police officer.

Also in January 2023, Media Matters for America published a note condemning political commentators Laura Ingraham, Charlie Kirk, and Matt Walsh for implying that William and Zachary Zulock's crimes, two gay men from the state of Georgia who abused their adoptive sons, were part of a problem with same-sex adoption.

In March 2023, three protesters disrupted drag performer Medulla Oblongata's storytime reading session at the Avondale Library in Auckland, New Zealand. The reading session was part of "Pride Fest Out West", which involved dancing, songs, and stories told by a drag performer. In response, Police trespassed the protesters. Auckland Council official Darryl Soljan linked the protest to international media coverage of anti-LGBT opponents in the United States accusing drag performers and the LGBT community of grooming children and pedophilia.

Also in March, a show called CabaBabaRave for mothers and infants was forced to be canceled after footage of performers was shared on social media by conservative pages. CabaBabaRave's website, Instagram, and Facebook pages were also forced to be made private. Organizers claimed that the footage was being shared out of context and infants are unable to comprehend the performances and the shows are not different from other R-rated movie shows.

A March 2023 report by the Center for Countering Digital Hate (CCDH) found that tweets on Twitter linking LGBT people to "grooming" have increased by 119 percent since Elon Musk purchased the social media platform in October 2022.

A May 2023 poll by Gallup found that only 41 percent of Republicans think that same-sex relations are morally acceptable, a 15 percent drop from 2022, while Democratic approval of same-sex relations also fell from 85 percent in 2022 to 79 percent in 2023. Independent voters, on the other hand, have remained steady in their approval of same-sex relations. Business Insider noted that "The sharp drop in support among some Americans follows an especially aggressive year of anti-LGBTQ rhetoric and politics", including false allegations of "grooming".

The "groomer" conspiracy theory has also been noted as instrumental in motivating Uganda's "kill the gays" bill, after American evangelists including Scott Lively, Don Schmierer and Caleb Lee Brundidge allegedly held a three-day seminar called "Exposing the Truth Behind Homosexuality and the Homosexual Agenda" in the country.

== Reception ==
Reddit, TikTok, Meta (parent company of Facebook and Instagram) and formerly Twitter (prior to Elon Musk's buyout of the company) have said that using groomer as a slur against LGBT people violates their policies. R.G. Cravens of California Polytechnic State University has described the conspiracy as "completely, patently false".

According to Bryn Nelson in Scientific American, conspiracy theories based on pedophilia use disgust as a form of "stochastic terrorism", that incites audiences already primed for violence to target the subjects of those conspiracy theories.

Vox argued that the rhetoric which is used by proponents of the grooming conspiracy theory is similar to the rhetoric which was used by proponents of older conspiracy theories like the Pizzagate conspiracy theory and QAnon: "grooming accusations aren't concerned with making sense; they're about stirring up fear, anger, and hysteria — which is why they sound exactly like the kinds of fringe conspiracy theories that have been around for centuries. The new pedophile conspiracy rhetoric is essentially the same as all the old pedophile conspiracy rhetoric."

Kristen Mark of the University of Minnesota Medical School has described the conspiracy as "a tool to create hysteria and to create a social panic", calling it "frankly inaccurate". Emily Johnson of Ball State University has also described it as a moral panic, saying that there is "no better moral panic than a moral panic centered on potential harm to children".

Alejandra Caraballo of the Berkman Klein Center for Internet & Society has described it as "an attempt at the dehumanization and delegitimization of queer people's identities by associating them with pedophilia", adding that "when you start labeling groups with that, the calls for violence are inevitable." Jenifer McGuire, a professor in the department of family social science at the University of Minnesota, said that the grooming conspiracy theory comes "from an underlying desire to separate people who are different and to characterize them as less than or as evil. So it's a new form of homophobia and transphobia — or it's maybe the same old form but with new language."

The Canadian Anti-Hate Network has stated that trans people are "slandered the same way homosexual men were slandered in the 70s, and for the same reason: to deny them safety and equal rights", adding that "the far-right and their fellow travellers in the so-called Gender Critical or Trans-Exclusionary Radical Feminist movements use the exact same tropes in a bid to deny equal rights to trans persons." Florence Ashley, a professor at the University of Toronto, has stated that the conspiracy theory's focus on LGBT people in general and its focus on trans people in particular is being used to radicalize public opinion towards the far-right, comparing it to the great replacement conspiracy theory.

The Associated Press described the conspiracy theory as "another volley in the [United States'] ongoing culture wars, during which conservative lawmakers have also opposed the teaching of 'critical race theory' and proposed bills requiring schools to post all course materials online so parents can review them." In 2022, its stylebook stated: "Some people use the word groom or variants of it to falsely liken LGBTQ people's interactions with children, or education about LGBTQ issues, to the actions of child molesters. Do not quote people using the term in this context without clearly stating it is untrue."

Charles T. Moran, President of the Log Cabin Republicans, called the conspiracy theory a "subtle subterfuge that gays are pedophiles", adding that "I will take flak from people that this is reinforcing a trope that is not beneficial for anybody who's gay in public life."

Civil society organizations fighting on behalf of children's rights in the U.S. have expressed alarm over how right-wing efforts to use the physical and psychological abuse of minors as a partisan political matter damages efforts against child maltreatment, particularly regarding victims of child sexual abuse.

In an interview with Phys.org, Laura Palumbo, the communications director for the National Sexual Violence Resource Center (NSVRC), commented that "[m]any survivors may not even have disclosed (their experience) to their own friends, family and loved ones because of the shame and stigma that they face." She added, "And then to see that their stories are being tossed around by others to make a point about an unrelated issue does have a harmful impact". Jenny Coleman, the director of Stop It Now!, also expressed frustration. She remarked, "It feels like child sex abuse prevention is being hijacked by people to fit an agenda that has absolutely nothing to do with preventing child sexual abuse."

=== Lawsuits ===
A school librarian in Louisiana has filed a lawsuit alleging defamation by Facebook pages that falsely accused her of pedophilia. She also received online harassment and a death threat.

In 2023, the Ontario Superior Court of Justice ruled that the word "groomer" is a slur when used to attack LGBT people and drag performers, and is therefore not protected speech under anti-SLAPP laws.

On April 25, 2024, British actor Laurence Fox was ordered to pay £180,000 in damages for libelling former Stonewall trustee Simon Blake and former RuPaul's Drag Race contestant Crystal as "paedophiles" on X. The judge accepted evidence that his comments were "distinctively homophobic" and said they were "gross, groundless and indefensible".

=== Public opinion ===
By 1999, the belief that homosexuals were most likely to abuse children was only endorsed by 19% of heterosexual men and 10% of heterosexual women.

An April 2022 survey by the think tank Data for Progress found that 55% of likely voters rejected the label that "teachers and parents that support discussions about sexual orientation and gender identity in school are groomers" and only 29% of likely voters supported it. Broken down by party support, the survey found that 45% of likely Republican voters believe the label, contrasted to 29% of Independent voters and 15% of Democratic voters. American Jewish community related publication The Forward criticized the implications of this finding, noting the interconnected histories between hatred against Jews and against LGBT people, due to both groups being accused of corrupting children.

== See also ==
- 2020s anti-LGBT movement in the United States
- Anti-LGBT rhetoric
- Blood libel
- LGBT chemicals conspiracy theory
- 21st-century anti-trans movement in the United Kingdom
- Alt-right
- Anti-gender movement
- LGBTQ history in the United States
- LGBTQ rights in the United States
- LGBTQ rights opposition in the United States
- Transphobia in the United States
- Transgender genocide
- Parental rights movement
