= Acquired homosexuality =

Scientifically unsupported theory that homosexuality can be spread

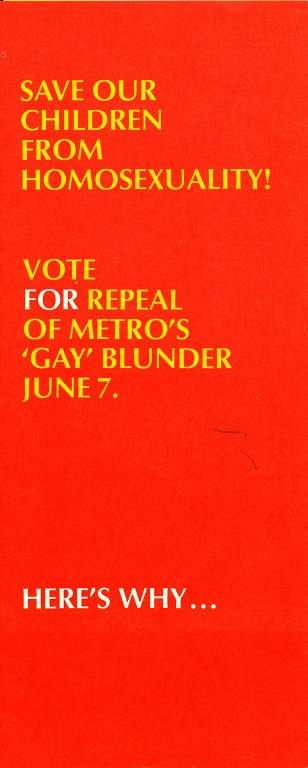
Anita Bryant's Save Our Children coalition promoted the idea of acquired homosexuality

Acquired homosexuality is the pseudoscientific idea that homosexuality can be spread, either through sexual seduction or recruitment by homosexuals, or through exposure to media depicting homosexuality. According to this belief, any child or young person could become homosexual if exposed to it; conversely, through conversion therapy, a homosexual person could be made heterosexual.

== Scientific evidence ==
Although there is not yet complete understanding of the causes of sexual orientation, the evidence supporting biological causes is much stronger than that supporting social factors, and there is little or no evidence supporting the theory that homosexuality can be acquired through sexual contact with homosexual adults. In contrast, there is evidence that homosexual attractions precede behavior, usually by a few years, in most cases. Bailey et al. state, "a belief in the recruitment hypothesis has often been associated with strongly negative attitudes toward homosexual people", and those who make this argument generally do not explain an empirical basis for this belief.

== History ==
In her book Epistemology of the Closet, Eve Kosofsky Sedgwick distinguishes between the minoritizing and universalizing view of sexual orientation; according to the former view, homosexuality is a property of a relatively stable minority, while according to latter view, anyone can potentially engage in homosexuality. The original view was a universalizing one, whereas the ideas about homosexuality being a fixed sexual preference developed in the second half of the nineteenth century, proposed independently by gay activist Karl Heinrich Ulrichs, French psychiatrist Claude-François Michéa, and German physician Johann Ludwig Casper. In the early twentieth century, German sexual science showed that many adolescent boys practiced homosexual behaviors (such as kisses, hugs, caresses, and mutual masturbation) for a few years; healthy development was considered to consist of abandoning them when they were older. It was believed that the incidence of adolescent homosexual behavior had increased after World War I, one of the most popular explanations being that adult homosexual men (either in person or via gay-oriented publications) had caused the increase. This theory was popular among the general public, but also among psychologists and psychiatrists who treated youth.

Based on the theories of Karl Bonhoeffer and Emil Kraepelin, the Nazis believed that homosexuals seduced young men and infected them with homosexuality, permanently changing the sexual orientation and preventing the youth from becoming fathers. Rhetoric described homosexuality as a contagious disease, but not in the medical sense. Rather, homosexuality was a disease of the Volkskörper (national body), a metaphor for the desired national or racial community (Volksgemeinschaft). According to Nazi ideology, individuals' lives were to be subordinated to the Volkskörper like cells in the human body. Homosexuality was seen as a virus or cancer in the Volkskörper because it was seen as a threat to the German nation. The SS newspaper Das Schwarze Korps argued that forty thousand homosexuals were capable of "poisoning" two million men if left to roam free.

== Consequences ==
Belief that homosexuality was acquired through sexual contact was one of the ideas fueling the persecution of homosexuals in Nazi Germany. Because of the all-male organizations for boys and young men, such as the Hitler Youth, SA, and SS, the Nazis were afraid that homosexuality would spread rapidly in the absence of a harsh crackdown. The murders of the Night of Long Knives were partially justified by claims of crushing alleged homosexual cliques in the SA. Adolf Hitler stated afterwards that "every mother should be able to send her son to the SA, Party, or Hitler Youth without fear that he would be ethically or morally corrupted there".

A 2018 study in the United States found that exposing participants to scientific information about the causes of homosexuality did not change support for LGBT rights.

=== Age of consent laws ===
Belief that it is possible to become homosexual through sexual contact with a person of the same sex has been cited in order to justify setting the age of consent higher for homosexual acts than heterosexual ones. This was the case in Belgium, the United Kingdom, and Germany both in the Weimar era and in West Germany.

In the 2003 European Court of Human Rights case S. L. v. Austria, the court ruled that "modern science had shown that sexual orientation was already established at the beginning of puberty", therefore discrediting the recruitment argument. The court, therefore, found that the different age of consent for male homosexual relationships was discriminatory and violated the applicant's human rights.

=== Censorship ===
The belief that homosexuality can be acquired by reading about it in media has been cited in justification for censorship of LGBT-focused media in the Weimar Republic in the United Kingdom with the Section 28 law intended to prevent young people from learning about homosexuality, and in 21st-century Hungary (the Hungarian anti-LGBT law) and Russia (the Russian gay propaganda law).

=== Employment discrimination ===
Belief that homosexuality can be acquired has been cited to promote direct occupational bans for known homosexuals, e.g. in education, as well as rejection of anti-discrimination laws covering sexual orientation. In 1977, anti-gay activist Anita Bryant claimed during the Save Our Children campaign, "Homosexuals cannot reproduce, so they must recruit."

== Public opinion ==
In the Weimar Republic, there was a widespread belief among Germans that homosexuality was not inborn but instead acquired. In Russia, a 2012 survey found that 61 percent of people believe homosexuality is acquired, while 25 percent believe it is innate.

== See also ==
- Chris Birch (stroke survivor), reportedly underwent a change of sexual orientation following a stroke
- LGBTQ chemicals conspiracy theory
- Rapid onset gender dysphoria controversy
- Situational homosexuality

== Works cited ==
- Giles, Geoffrey J. (2010). "The Persecution of Gay Men and Lesbians During the Third Reich". The Routledge History of the Holocaust. Routledge. pp. 385–396. ISBN 978-0-203-83744-3.
- Moss, Kevin (2021). "Russia's Queer Science, or How Anti-LGBT Scholarship is Made". The Russian Review. 80 (1): 17–36. doi:10.1111/russ.12296. S2CID 234307412.
- Sedgwick, Eve Kosofsky (1990). Epistemology of the Closet. University of California Press. ISBN 978-0-520-07874-1.
- Snyder, David Raub (2007). Sex Crimes Under the Wehrmacht. University of Nebraska Press. ISBN 978-0-8032-0742-4.
- Vendrell, Javier Samper (2020). Seduction of Youth: Print Culture and Homosexual Rights in the Weimar Republic. University of Toronto Press. ISBN 978-1-4875-2503-3.
- Whisnant, Clayton J. (2016). Queer Identities and Politics in Germany: A History, 1880–1945. Columbia University Press. ISBN 978-1-939594-10-5.
- Zinn, Alexander (2020). "»Das sind Staatsfeinde« Die NS-Homosexuellenverfolgung 1933–1945" ["They are enemies of the state": The Nazi persecution of homosexuals 1933–1945] (PDF). Bulletin des Fritz Bauer Instituts: 6–13. ISSN 1868-4211.
