= Anti-LGBTQ curriculum laws in the United States =

Laws limiting mention of LGBTQ topics in US public schools

State law prohibits LGBTQ inclusive instruction in the classroom as of October 2026. State law prohibits LGBTQ inclusive instruction in the classroom up to a certain age and requires parental notification past that age. State law prohibits LGBTQ inclusive instruction in the classroom up to a certain age. State law requires parental notification of LGBTQ inclusive instruction and allows parents to opt their children out. State law explicitly requires LGBTQ inclusion in state curricular standards.

Anti-LGBTQ curriculum laws are laws approved by various U.S. states that limit the discussion of sexuality and gender identity in public schools. In theory, these laws mainly apply to sex ed courses, but they can also be applied to other parts of the school curriculum such as restricting the teaching of gender deconstructionist theory (GDT). These laws may also affect extracurricular activities such as sports and organizations such as gay–straight alliances. In July 2022, a wave of anti-LGBTQ curriculum resurgence saw ten such laws beginning to take effect in six different states. Some states enacting these new laws appear to have mirrored similar laws from other states.

In Florida, the Parental Rights in Education law and Florida Board of Education policy bans education on "sexual orientation" or "gender identity" unless it is mandated under state academic standards or as part of an optional reproductive health course or lesson, while Alabama bans the topics from kindergarten to grade 5, except for instruction deemed "age or developmentally appropriate," and Iowa bans the topics from kindergarten to grade 6. Five other states (Montana, Arizona, Arkansas, Tennessee and Florida) require parental notification of instruction on LGBTQ issues and allows parents to opt-out of such instruction.

In June 2025, the Supreme Court in Mahmoud v. Taylor held that a school district's policy of not permitting opt-outs of instruction involving LGBTQ-themed storybooks in a Maryland public school system violated the right to free exercise of religion under the First Amendment.

== History ==
Censorship laws in the U.S can be seen starting as early as the 1775. Censorship in this context is creating laws to criminalize unacceptable materials that go against the mainstream ideals. Throughout the 1800s, marriage was defined as union between a man and a woman. These social definitions of sexuality shaped what the law would consider to be appropriate to teach in public institutions such as schools.

As the 1880s neared, the progressive education movement took hold throughout America lasting until the late 1950s. During this period in the early 1900s, Chicago public schools started to integrate social hygiene. Social hygiene education was intended to focus on prevention of disease and centered around morality. This concern developed as the public started to fear disease and prostitution, creating social pressure that influenced this to emerge. This was the start of sex education being introduced into the school environment.

In the 1970s, the U.S government started making federal laws toward teaching abstinence. This means to abstain from sexual contact until marriage. The focus of these laws were to teach that sexual contact has no benefit unless it is within a heterosexual marriage. These policies shaped abstinence only sex education curricula within public schools. Moving into the 1980s, the AIDS crisis caused Americans to panic, urging for the addition of safe sex practices into public health. However, the response to this panic varied across each state as they have the power to make individual laws.

=== Current ===
In the most recent years, the U.S government spent almost 60 million dollars by 2016 towards abstinence curricula. This federal funding continues to support abstinence teachings even with ongoing debates around comprehensive sex education. These factors contribute to the perpetuation of LGBTQ+ exclusion from curricula.

== State laws ==
=== Louisiana ===
"No sex education course offered in the public schools of the state shall utilize any sexually explicit materials depicting male or female homosexual activity ... The major emphasis of any sex education instruction offered in the public schools of this state shall be to encourage sexual abstinence between unmarried persons and any such instruction shall: ... Emphasize abstinence from sexual activity outside of marriage as the expected standard for all school-age children." La. R.S. § 17:281. State Legislator Dodie Horton introduced HB 837 in the 2022 Legislative Session which would prohibit any public school teacher, employee or presenter from discussing sexual orientation or gender identity; it died in committee.

=== Mississippi ===
"Abstinence-only education shall remain the state standard for any sex-related education taught in the public schools. For purposes of this section, abstinence-only education includes any type of instruction or program which, at an appropriate age ... [t]eaches the current state law related to sexual conduct, including forcible rape, statutory rape, ... and homosexual activity ... and teaches that a mutually faithful, monogamous relationship in the context of marriage is the only appropriate setting for sexual intercourse." Miss. Code § 37-13-171.

=== Ohio ===
House Bill 8 or "Enact the Parents' Bill of Rights" was primarily sponsored by D. J. Swearingen (R) and Sara P. Carruthers (R). The legislation was proposed on March 7, 2023, in the Primary and Secondary Education House Committee, passing in committee on June, 16th 2023 with a 10–5 vote down party lines. HB 8 then passed the house on June 21, 2023 with 65–29 vote down party lines. HB then was passed by the Senate Committee on Education on December 18, 2024, with a 5–2 vote down party lines. That night, the legislation passed the State Senate with a 24–7 vote with Louis W. Blessing, III (R) being the only State Senator to vote across the aisle.

HB 8 statement about "sexuality content" in school:

The policy shall require a school district to... Ensure that any sexuality content is age appropriate and developmentally appropriate for the age of the student receiving the instruction, regardless of the age or grade level of the student. Prior to providing instruction that includes sexuality content or permitting a third party to provide such instruction on behalf of the district, provide parents the opportunity to review any instructional material that includes sexuality content. Upon request of the student's parent, a student shall be excused from instruction that includes sexuality content and be permitted to participate in an alternative assignment.... No school district or third party acting on behalf of a district shall provide instruction that includes sexuality content to students in grades kindergarten through three..."Sexuality content" means any oral or written instruction, presentation, image, or description of sexual concepts or gender ideology provided in a classroom setting

HB 8 statement about "parent's rights" to their student's information:

Notify a student's parent of any substantial change in the student's services, including counseling services, or monitoring related to the student's mental, emotional, or physical health or well-being or the school's ability to provide a safe and supportive learning environment for the student … "Student's mental, emotional, or physical health or well-being" includes, at a minimum, any of the following... any request by a student to identify as a gender that does not align with the student’s biological sex.

=== Oklahoma ===
"AIDS prevention education shall specifically teach students that: 1. engaging in homosexual activity, promiscuous sexual activity, intravenous drug use or contact with contaminated blood products is now known to be primarily responsible for contact with the AIDS virus; 2. avoiding the activities specified in paragraph 1 of this subsection is the only method of preventing the spread of the virus." 70 Okla. Stat. § 11-103.3.

=== Texas ===
Texas Statute Books currently contain two anti-LGBTQ curriculum laws:

- The Texas Health & Safety Code § 85.007 says: "The materials in the education programs intended for persons younger than 18 years of age must: (1) emphasize sexual abstinence before marriage and fidelity in marriage as the expected standard."
- The Texas Health & Safety Code § 163.002 says: "Course materials and instruction relating to sexual education or sexually transmitted diseases should include: [...] (8) emphasis, provided in a factual manner and from a public health perspective, that homosexuality is not a lifestyle acceptable to the general public."

In November 2020, the Texas Board of Education had an opportunity to update these laws, but the Republican majority voted not to in a 9–6 vote. Despite this, they did vote in favor of updating the anti-bullying policy to include language about "sexual bullying", although it was unclear if this included LGBTQ students or not, and when the conservative board members were questioned what the term meant, they could not give a straight definition.

As of March 2022, the Texas anti-LGBTQ curriculum laws remain on the statute books.

=== Florida ===
In March 2022, the Florida Legislature passed House Bill 1557, the Parental Rights in Education Act, often referred to as the "Don't Say Gay" bill by its opponents. Governor of Florida Ron DeSantis signed the bill into law on March 28, 2022. The law goes into effect from July 1. The law prohibits classroom instruction on sexual orientation or gender identity from kindergarten to grade 3 in Florida public school districts, or instruction on sexual orientation or gender identity in a manner that is not "age appropriate or developmentally appropriate for students" in any grade. The preamble of the law also mentions "classroom discussion" of these topics, dividing legal scholars if that would be included within the scope of the law. It also allows parents and teachers to sue any school district if they believe this policy is violated, with school districts covering the cost of the lawsuit. The bill additionally prevents school districts from withholding information about a child's "mental, emotional, or physical well-being" from their parents. Due to the "Don't Say Gay" nickname, some commentators and social media users incorrectly believed the bill banned mentioning the word "gay" in school classrooms. The bill does not explicitly prohibit the use of the word "gay;" it prohibits classroom instruction or "discussion" on "sexual orientation or gender identity."

The bill was contested by a lawsuit in the United States District Court for the Northern District of Florida alleging intrusions on the First Amendment, and that it violates Title IX and Due Process. In October 2022, federal judge Wendy Berger dismissed the suit, for lack of standing, which challenged the legislation effective since July 1. She gave the plaintiffs 14 days to file a revised lawsuit.

In 2023, Ron DeSantis called for the Florida Parental Rights in Education Act to be expanded to the twelfth grade, hence banning all discussion on gender and sexual orientation topics.

=== Alabama ===
In April 2021, Alabama governor Kay Ivey signed a repeal of a 1992 law that required "Course materials and instruction that relate to sexual education or sexually transmitted diseases should include ... an emphasis, in a factual manner and from a public health perspective, that homosexuality is not a lifestyle acceptable to the general public and that homosexual conduct is a criminal offense under the laws of the state." Ala. Code § 16-40A-2. However, in 2022, Ivey signed similar legislation prohibiting LGBTQ instruction in 2022 after Florida passed its law.

=== Indiana ===
Indiana's "Don't Say Gay" bill was signed into law in 2023. It prohibits teaching the topics of gender fluidity, gender stereotypes, gender identity, gender expression, and sexual orientation. In February 2024, a website was launched that aims to stop "objectionable curricula, policies, or programs affecting children". It features a submission form where people can report school material that violates Indiana law. Critics have described it as anti-LGBTQ and a "snitch line". Within hours of its launch, users submitted memes to the form in protest.

=== Arizona ===
In July 2021, Arizona governor Doug Ducey signed a bill requiring parents to opt-in to any instruction "regarding sexuality."

=== South Dakota ===
The House Bill 1217 was voted by the House State Affairs Committee to advance in 2021 winning with a 11–2 vote. This bill bans transgender girls from playing in any female public school sports teams grades K-12 and public colleges. The bill will not be enforced by the school and its staff but by allowing the citizens to sue their schools if they believe the school is violating the ban. The bill also singles out trans girls specifically by making no mention of trans boys and their ability to play in their schools male sports teams.

== Repealed laws ==
=== Arizona ===
In April 2019, the Arizona State Legislature passed (House vote 55–5 and Senate vote 19–10) and the Governor of Arizona signed a repeal of the 1991 HIV law (ARS § 15-716) that prohibited AIDS and HIV-related "instruction which: 1. Promotes a homosexual life-style. 2. Portrays homosexuality as a positive alternative life-style. 3. Suggests that some methods of sex are safe methods of homosexual sex." Due to several court cases running, the constitutionality of the law was questioned. The repeal went into effect on July 1, 2019.

=== North Carolina ===
In 2006 with the passage of 2006 N.C. Sess. Laws 264,§ 54(a)–(c), the North Carolina State Legislature amended N.C. Gen. Stat. § 115C-81(e1)(3) to remove the prohibition of discussing homosexuality.

=== Utah ===
On October 21, 2016, Equality Utah filed a lawsuit with the U.S. District Court for the District of Utah against the Utah State Board of Education to strike down Utah Code § 53A-13-101(1)(c)(iii)(A). On March 8, 2017, the Utah State Legislature passed SB196, which removes the phrase "the advocacy of homosexuality" from the law. On March 20, 2017, Governor Gary Herbert signed SB196 into law. The repeal went into effect on July 1, 2017.

The repealed statute stated "[T]he materials adopted by a local school board ... shall be based upon recommendations of the school district's Curriculum Materials Review Committee that comply with state law and state board rules emphasizing abstinence before marriage and fidelity after marriage, and prohibiting instruction in the advocacy of homosexuality." Utah Code § 53A-13-101.

== Overturned laws ==
=== South Carolina ===
On March 11, 2020, the US District Court of South Carolina ruled in GSA v. Spearman that South Carolina's anti-LGBTQ curriculum law "cannot satisfy any level of judicial review under the Equal Protection Clause". The Court ordered that "[t]he Superintendent and the Superintendent's officers, assigns, successors, agents, employees, attorneys, and other persons who are acting in concert or in participation with each or any of them, are permanently enjoined from enforcing, applying, or relying on S.C. Code. § 59-32-30(A)(5)." This rendered S.C. Code. § 59-32-30(A)(5) unenforceable.

The judgement was a consent decree. The defendant, the superintendent of the South Carolina Department of Education, agreed that the law was likely unconstitutional after receiving advice from South Carolina Attorney General Alan Wilson and decided to accept the Court's terms.

== Court Cases ==
- Mahmoud v. Taylor

== See also ==
- LGBTQ rights in the United States
  - Save Our Children
  - 2020s anti-LGBTQ movement in the United States
- LGBTQ rights opposition
- Censorship of LGBT issues
  - Russian gay propaganda law
- LGBTQ sex education
- Education and the LGBTQ community
- 2022 Hungarian LGBTQ in education referendum
- Acquired homosexuality
- Homosexual seduction
- Section 28
- Safety Act (California law)
