= Goudreau =

Goudreau is a surname. Notable people with the surname include:

- Barry Goudreau (born 1951), American musician
- Hector Goudreau (born 1950), Canadian politician from Alberta
- Jordan Goudreau (born 1976), Canadian-American mercenary
- Kevin Goudreau (born 1975/1976), Canadian white nationalist
