= Chris Birch =

Chris Birch may refer to:

- Chris Birch (stroke survivor) (born 1984), Welsh stroke survivor
- Chris Birch (game designer), British game designer
- Chris Birch (politician) (1950–2019), American politician
