= Safety Act =

Safety Act or SAFETY Act may refer to:

- Support Anti-Terrorism by Fostering Effective Technologies Act
- Safety Act (California law)

== See also ==
- SAFE-T Act, an Illinois statute
