= Sedgwickian =

Sedgwickian is an adjective that may refer to:

- Adam Sedgwick (1785–1873), one of the founders of modern geology
- Eve Kosofsky Sedgwick (1950–2009), an American academic scholar in the fields of gender studies, queer theory, and critical theory
