= Drag panic =

Ongoing moral panic alleging drag is harmful to minors

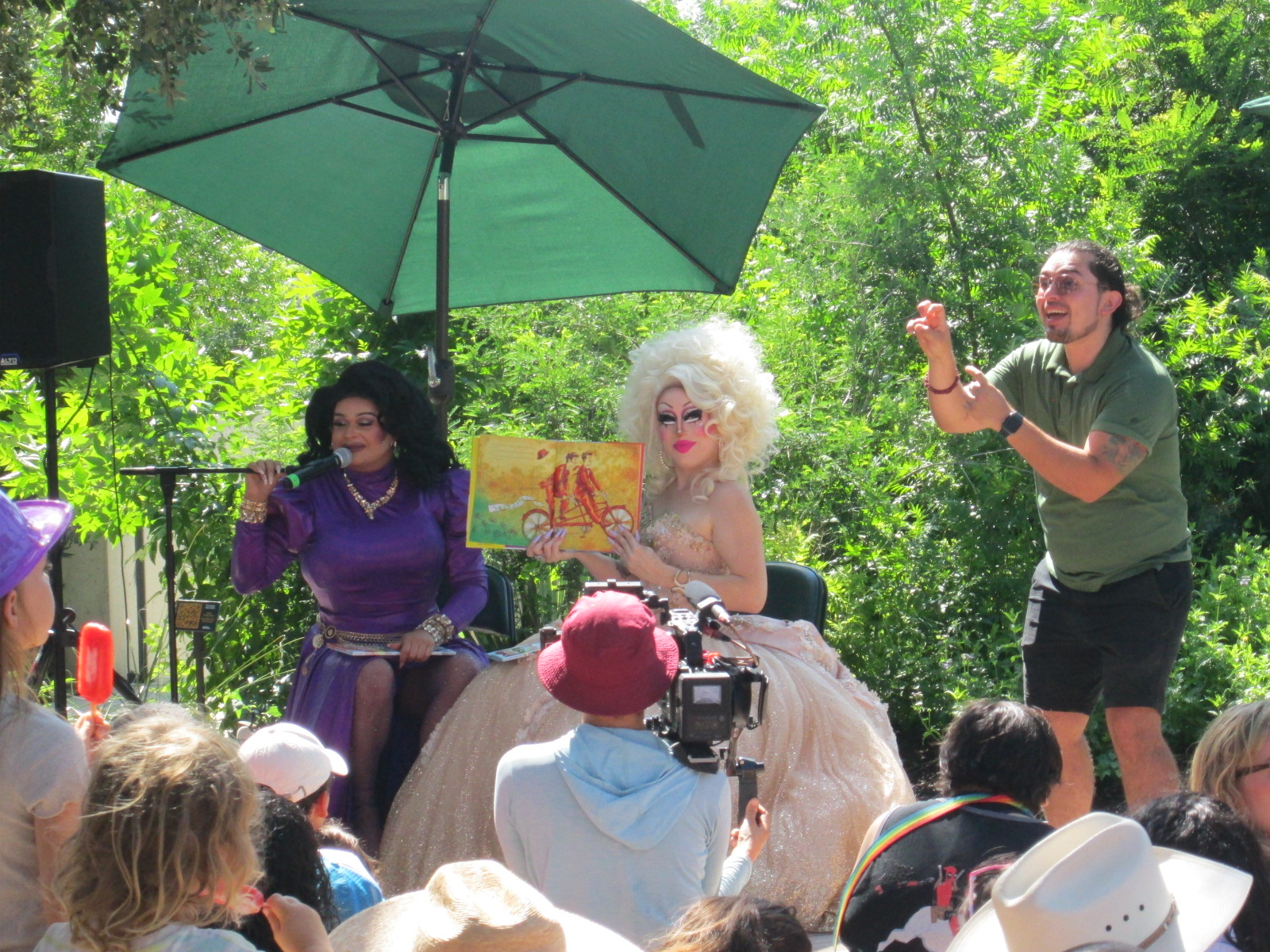
Drag queen storytime in Austin, Texas (2023)

Drag panic (also called drag queen panic or anti-drag hysteria) is a moral panic that stems from the belief that exposure to drag, especially for minors, can be harmful, due to its perceived sexual nature. Drag panic has motivated protests and attacks against the LGBTQ+ community by extremist groups, and often includes the belief that all-ages drag performances are attempts by the LGBTQ+ community to sexualize or recruit children.

Anti-drag sentiment (and broader anti-trans and anti-LGBTQ+ sentiment), which had been building for a number of years, became more prominent in 2019. Since then, a series of rallies and counter-rallies have been held in the United States, United Kingdom, Australia, Canada and in other countries, largely against drag queens reading children's books at family events. Throughout 2022, there were at least 141 incidents of protests and harassment towards drag events in the United States alone. Drag panic has been suggested as a motivator for the fire bombing of an Oklahoma doughnut shop and the Club Q mass shooting, among other violent incidents.

== Background ==
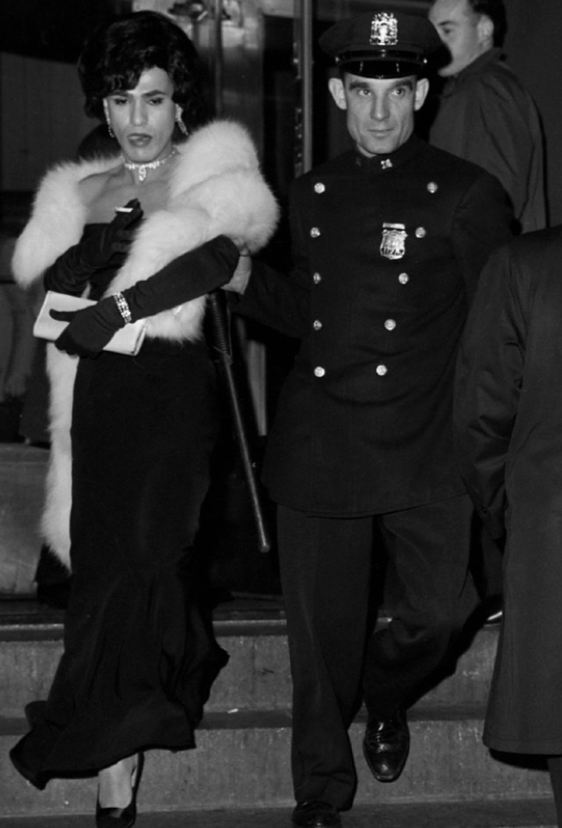
Drag queen arrested in NYC, 1962

Throughout much of the early-twentieth century, drag performances in the United States were criminalized under cross dressing laws. The 1969 Stonewall Riots began after the New York City Police Department sought to arrest people for violating New York's informal "three-item rule" (which required individuals to wear at least three articles of clothing of their assigned sex).

As such laws were relaxed in the second half of the 20th century, drag appeared in works of wide popular relevance, such as Some Like It Hot (1959) and The Birdcage (1996), and the Australian film The Adventures of Priscilla, Queen of the Desert (1994). In the early 21st century, the art of drag continued to gain popularity and went mainstream in American culture, such as via RuPaul's Drag Race, Queen of the Universe, and Drag Den.

By 2019, as a reaction to the mainstream profile of drag, right-wing figures such as Chaya Raichik, Matt Walsh, Tucker Carlson, Michael Knowles, Dennis Prager, Candace Owens, and Ben Shapiro, began to link drag queens to the LGBT grooming conspiracy theory, calling to limit their visibility. Subsequently, a number of American states (with a Republican majority) proposed and approved laws intended to limit drag queen performances in public. Some protestors at LGBTQ+ and drag events have been armed with guns and explosives, and/or engaged in acts of violence or property damage. Similar anti-drag protests, sometimes amounting to threats or violence, have since been made in Australia, Canada, the UK and elsewhere, often influenced by these American right-wing figures.

== By region ==
=== North America ===
==== United States ====
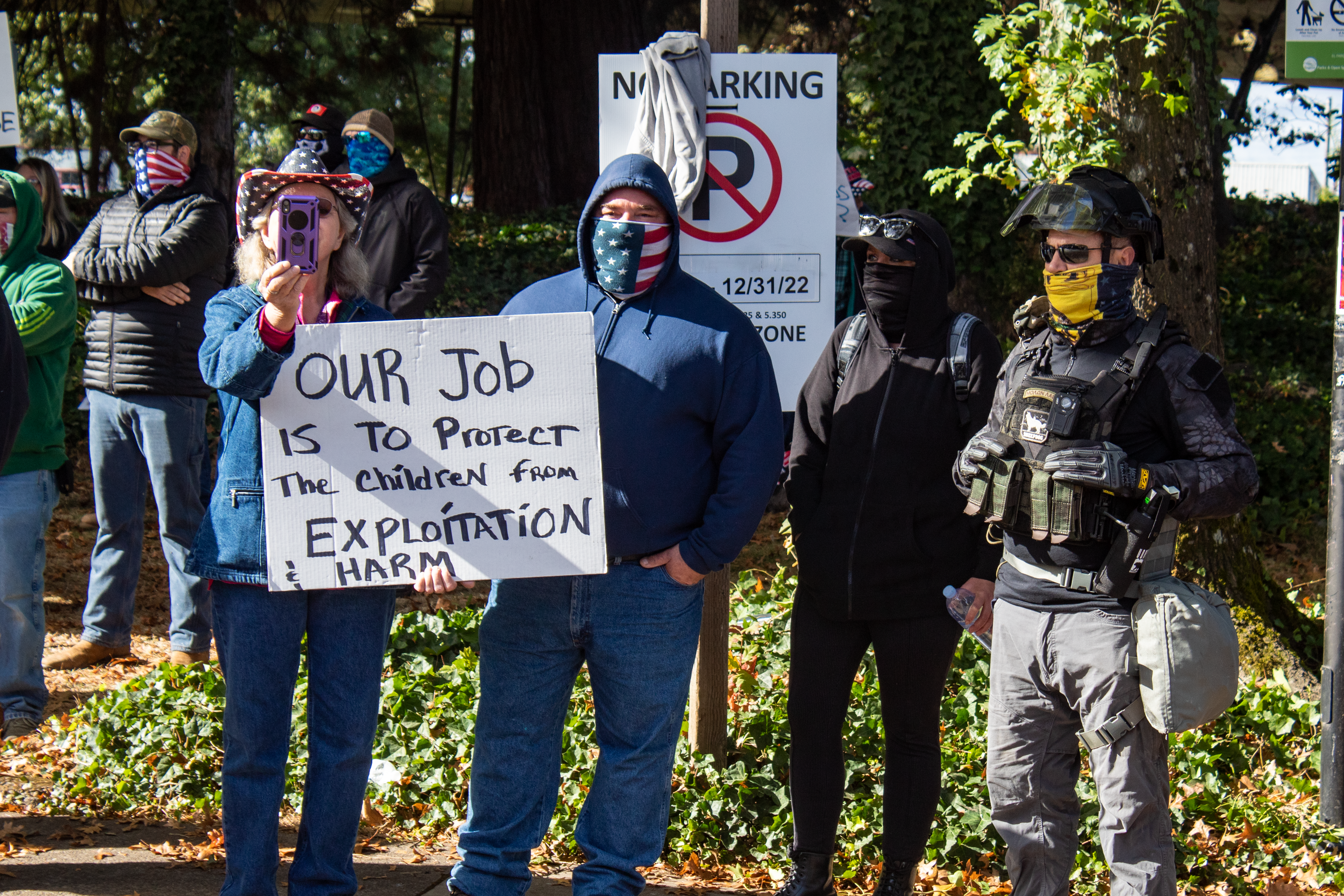
People protesting against Drag Queen Story Hour in 2022

Protests against drag performances, especially Drag Queen Story Hour, increased after the 2021 attacks at the United States Capitol. The most vocal opponents are mostly affiliated with alt-right groups. Former Fox News host Tucker Carlson suggested that drag events could "indoctrinate or sexualize" children. Protestors also have expressed homophobic conspiracy theories that performers are grooming children. The Anti-Defamation League reported that the child abuse conspiracy theory has been fueled by the Libs of TikTok, a far-right Twitter account.

LGBTQ media advocacy group GLAAD reported over 140 threats against drag shows in the US, throughout 2022. According to a 2022 GLAAD analysis of United States media, social media, and news coverage, as of December 14, 2022, there had been at least "141 incidents in 2022 of anti-LGBTQ protests and threats targeting specific drag events, including during Pride festivities and false rhetoric against performers deployed in campaign ads for the midterm elections." The report also stated incidents included "armed white supremacists demonstrating in Texas and the firebombing of a Tulsa donut shop that had hosted a drag event in October." USA Today reported that harassment including threats of lynching and castration had been made to drag performers.

In June 2022, "Drag Your Kids to Pride", an event at Mr Misster, a gay bar in Dallas, Texas, resulted in protests after videos from the event showed drag queens dancing while children and their parents watched and tipped them. Attendees said the event was a celebration; the children played musical chairs and some of them walked on the catwalk with performers. Protesters accused the organizers and performers of "grooming" children and objected to a sign in the background of the club that read, "It's Not Gonna Lick Itself". In response, protesters made transphobic and homophobic remarks, as well as sending several hundred threatening emails, making threatening phones calls, and leaving negative reviews online. Republican Representative Bryan Slaton from northeast Texas said he would file a bill to ban children from viewing such events.

A January 2023 report by the Anti-Defamation League, titled "Online Amplifiers of Anti-LGBTQ+ Extremism" noted groups involved in protests against drag shows included Gays Against Groomers, Blaze Media, the Texas Family Project, Defend Our Kids Texas, and the Aryan Freedom Network.

In May 2023, masked neo-Nazi groups in Ohio protested a drag event in Columbus, carrying anti-drag and anti-trans banners, such as one that read, "there will be blood."

In May 2023, Montana became the first state in the United States to specifically ban people dressed in drag from reading books to children at public schools and libraries regardless of the sexual significance of the event. In July 2023, a federal judge blocked the ban from taking effect. In October 2023, another federal judge upheld the block.

In June 2023, Texas Governor Greg Abbott signed a law banning public drag performances. In September 2023, a federal judge blocked the ban from taking effect saying it was unconstitutional. Also in June 2023, a U.S. judge blocked a Florida law restricting drag performances from taking effect.

In mid-June 2022, the far-right Twitter account Libs of TikTok condemned the upcoming Coeur d'Alene, Idaho's "Pride in the Park" festival due to a "family-friendly drag performance." On June 11, 2022, during the pride event, law enforcement arrested 31 members of the white nationalist hate group Patriot Front, later charging them with conspiracy to riot.

In July 2023, Kristi Maris, a schoolteacher of nineteen years, was fired from her job at the First Baptist Academy in Baytown, Texas after posting a picture of herself attending a drag show at Hamburger Mary's in Houston on Facebook with the caption, "This was such a blast!!!!". The email that Maris received from the school about the termination of her job claimed that she had breached the school's operating policies manual, which stated that employees "will act in a godly and moral fashion at work, on Facebook and in (the teachers') community".

===== Tennessee drag ban =====
On March 2, 2023, Tennessee governor Bill Lee signed the Tennessee Senate Bill 3 to equate drag queen performances with sexual performers. This bill faced widespread opposition throughout the United States, including from politicians and drag queens. Subsequently, a 1977 photo emerged of Lee dressed in a female cheerleading outfit in the company of high school classmates. The ban was later ruled unconstitutional in June 2023 in federal district court. On July 18, 2024, a three-judge panel on the Sixth Circuit reinstated the law by ruling that the plaintiffs had lacked the standing to sue. The ruling did not address whether the law was constitutional.

==== Canada ====
Anti-drag protests in Canada have been influenced by the American anti-drag and anti-LGBTQ+ movement. This has led to an increase in anti-LGBTQ+ hate. At present, however, this has not yet extended to anti-drag legislation.

On November 23, 2022, people protested a drag storytelling event in the Kitsilano neighborhood of Vancouver, accusing the event of "sexualizing children." The next day, Book Keeper independent book shop in Sarnia, was protested by 10–12 men wearing masks and balaclavas as it hosted its fourth Drag Queen Story Time event. Also in November 2022, an event at Kelseys Original Roadhouse in Burlington, featuring Guelph drag queen Crystal Quartz was canceled following threats made towards the restaurant.

On December 19, 2022, fourteen protestors gathered outside Brockville Public Library in Ontario as it held its first Drag Story Time event. The protestors were met by counter-protestors, which included the library's CEO. Police searched the library for explosive devices after a threat was made.

Twice in December 2022, protestors interrupted drag performances at the Britbar venue in Penticton, British Columbia, and at DunnEnzies restaurant in British Columbia's Okanagan.

Events in January, February, March, May, and June 2023 by performer Betty Baker were protested at the Peterborough Public Library in Ontario by Kevin Goudreau, Save Canada, and other individuals. On all occasions protesters were outnumbered by counter-protesters.

=== Europe ===
==== United Kingdom ====
In July 2022, right-wing groups protested Drag Queen Story Hour at Reading Central Library in Berkshire. The event featured Sab Samuel performing in drag as Aida H Dee. Subsequent protests occurred in Crewe and Bristol, and at Glastonbury Public Library. In August 2022, 50 protestors were met with about 300 counter-protestors outside a drag event at Oxfordshire County Library; police kept the two groups separated. The same month, a drag show featuring Matthew Cavan performing as drag queen Cherri Ontop in Belfast was the target of a protest. Flyers promoting protests to drag performances in the UK were shared in anti-vaccination Telegram groups.

A 2023 report from the Institute for Strategic Dialogue noted an increase in extremist groups targeting LGBTQ+ and drag storytime events in the UK, and accused Conservative MPs of contributing to growing hostility towards LGBTQ+ people in the country. The report also noted that many of these messages were being imported from the US and were being used to provoke "culture wars" at home. According to the report, the UK was second only to the US in terms of anti-drag protests. Report author Aoife Gallagher said, "These incidents should not be viewed in isolation; they speak to a wider anti-LGBTQ+ mobilisation in the UK and they raise concerns about a backsliding trend in LGBTQ+ rights. Although counter-protesters at drag events often outnumbered protesters, this is not enough to protect these communities."

==== Finland ====
Helsinki Central Library Oodi arranged a drag queen story hour in conjunction with to the Helsinki Pride festival on 1 July 2022. The performer, nicknamed Gaylien 2000, declined to reveal their true identity. Around 25-30 protesters demonstrated and conducted speeches in front of the library, after which some of them entered the library in an attempt to block the event. This prompted a large police response. The performer had been accused of paedophilia and threatened online before the event.

Cultural center Malmitalo in Helsinki planned to screen a documentary named Drag Kids during a festival in 2023. The event was canceled due to a security threat. The documentary contained scenes where a child danced at a nightclub and received a tip from a drag queen, which Children's Ombudsman Elina Pekkarinen considered inappropriate and sexualizing.

==== France ====
In 2023, a reading story hour activity in Toulouse was cancelled due to protests on social media by extremist groups.

During the opening ceremony of the 2024 Summer Olympics a group of drag queens recreated a Banquet of the Gods of Dionysian type but some political and journalistic figures linked the event to Leonardo da Vinci's Last Supper, accusing the drag queens of blasphemy. This also prompted a series of death and rape threats to Barbara Butch, the lesbian DJ and fat-acceptance activist at the center of the event.

=== Australia & Oceania ===
==== Australia ====
In July 2018, Adam Larkham, performing as "Roxee Horror", received abuse and threats for storytime events at Wollongong Library. Larkham later said he was worried he was "going to get shot in the face" due to the threats he received when the event was shared on Facebook by the former Labor leader Mark Latham.

In May 2019, the drag queen "Annie Depressant" received abuse for an event at Whittlesea Library; the conservative Facebook page Political Posting Mumma (run by Marijke Rancie) had called on its "warriors" to respond to the library's social media posts to protest the event. In January 2020, Annie Depressant was also faced with a small group of protesters during an event for children and their parents at Werribee Plaza Library. The families chanted "we love drag queens" as a counterprotest when they left the event.

On September 30, 2022, a family-friendly youth festival in Moonee Ponds, Melbourne was cut short when the white supremacist National Socialist Network, a group of Australian neo-Nazis founded by convicted criminal Thomas Sewell, interrupted the event because it hosted drag performers. The protesters reportedly made homophobic, transphobic and antisemitic comments; the protest was described as "distressing, offensive and illegal" by Victoria's Minister for Equality Harriet Shing.

In November 2022, South Australian Liberal Senator Alex Antic accused drag performer Courtney Act's ABC show of "grooming Australian children". Greens Senator Sarah Hanson-Young challenged the comments and said they were deeply offensive to many, including survivors of sexual assault.

On December 8, 2022, the Glitter Nova event (aimed at people aged 16–25) scheduled at Victorian Pride Centre was postponed following threats of protest from neo-Nazis. Anti-fascist researcher Andy Fleming argued against canceling the event, feeling it could "embolden" extremist groups.

In April 2023, after receiving many threats online and over the phone, Alice Rebel Cafe canceled an event featuring drag queens. One person had claimed they could track the performers' home addresses via their car license plates when they arrived at the venue; another said "As they crumble, you're smiling like a shark, predators become prey" on Telegram. In response to news of the threats and the event cancelation, the cafe received widespread support on social media.

Also in April 2023, a Monash City Council meeting was interrupted by protestors who called councillors "pedophiles" for refusing to cancel a drag queen event planned for Oakleigh Library. Groups who participated in the protest included My Place and Reignite Democracy Australia. Extra security arrived, as did the local police. A week later, the council canceled the event due to fears over safety.

In May 2023, regional councils canceled a number of drag and LGBTQ+ events across Victoria due to threats from far-right groups. Organizers said they didn't feel they could ensure the events were safe due to the threats from far-right and fascist groups. The deputy principal of Woodleigh School was also targeted. The Municipal Association of Victoria held an emergency meeting to address the rise in far-right and neo-Nazi groups targeting LGBTQ+ events, with anti-extremism experts and the police addressing mayors from the region.

In February 2024, a drag story time event in Rockdale Library in southern Sydney, which was going to be broadcast by ABC, was canceled after being targeted by far-right groups and individuals. In a statement, the network condemned the "hateful and offensive" response they had received and said they were considering how to hold the event at another location to ensure the safety of those involved.

==== New Zealand ====
On 1 March 2023, a drag queen storytime event was held at a library in the Auckland suburb of Avondale. However, the library was forced to close due to a protest of approximately three people accusing the event of the "sexualisation of children." In mid-March 2023, the "Queens Telling Stories" event at Christchurch's Tūranga Library was picketed by 36 protesters. Christchurch Pride chairperson Jill Stevens accused the protesters of "hate speech". 160 supporters attend the Queens reading reading event.

On 20 March 2024, a proposed drag queen storytime event at Rotorua's library was cancelled following safety concerns about misinformation and violence. Rotorua Lakes Councillor Robert Lee and Destiny Church leader Brian Tamaki also expressed opposition to the proposed Rotorua drag storytime. On 26 March, a drag storytime event at Gisborne's library attracted opposition from members of Destiny Church, who also painted over a rainbow crossing. In response, LGBTQ+ counter-protesters gathered outside Gisborne's library to support the drag storytime event. Mayor of Gisborne Rehette Stoltz condemned the vandalism of the rainbow crossing, which was repainted by the Gisborne District Council. Police later arrested five individuals who attempted to vandalise the rainbow crossing a second time. Police charged two men and a woman with graffiti vandalism in relation to the Gisborne rainbow crossing incident.

Following the Gisborne protest, the Hastings District Council canceled an upcoming Erika and CoCo Flash Rainbow Story event, citing safety concerns following a large volume of "threatening and intimidating" messages.

On 28 March 2024, a rainbow crossing in Auckland's Karangahape Road was vandalized with white paint. Police described the vandalism as a "hate crime" while Radio New Zealand linked the incident to the protest against the drag queen storytime event in Gisborne. Several New Zealand politicians including Minister of Police Mark Mitchell, Prime Minister Christopher Luxon and ACT leader David Seymour denounced the vandalism of the Karangahape rainbow crossing. On 15 April Ford O'Connor, a member of Destiny Church who is married to Tamaki's granddaughter, pleaded guilty to vandalizing the Karangahape Road rainbow crossing and was fined $16,093 to cover the repair costs. During the sentencing, Tamaki expressed support for O'Connor, saying that "he undertook a political protest against the excessive rainbow-washing that is occurring across New Zealand right now."

In late April 2024, Rainbow Storytime NZ's founder Sunita Torrance cancelled a nationwide tour scheduled to pursue a defamation case against Destiny Church. By contrast, Destiny Church leader Tamaki welcomed the cancellation of Rainbow Storytime NZ's tours on social media.

== Media ==
Following the origin of the drag panic and the consequent restrictive legislation on the subject, various telethons have been organized on the subject, such as Drag Isn't Dangerous, which featured numerous drag queens, including contestants from RuPaul's Drag Race, as well as actors and comedians such as Margaret Cho, Leslie Jones, Ts Madison, Amy Schumer, and Charlize Theron.

== See also ==
- Anti-gender movement – International movement opposed to the concept of gender identity
- Anti-LGBT rhetoric
- Censorship in the United States
- Democratic backsliding in the United States
- LGBT grooming conspiracy theory
- Bathroom bill – Laws restricting bathroom access
- 2020s anti-LGBT movement in the United States
- Drag-a-thon, Portland, Oregon
