= Homosexual seduction =

Controversial sexological theory

Boys Beware - A 1961 American anti-homosexual film targeted at teenage boys, urging them to avoid encounters with potential molesters

Homosexual seduction is the pseudoscientific conspiracy theory which suggests homosexuality is spread through intergenerational sex, and that older homosexuals aim to change the sexual orientation of previously heterosexual youth by seducing them. It is related to the LGBTQ grooming conspiracy theory, the discredited acquired homosexuality theory, the gay agenda conspiracy theory, and the drag panic phenomenon.

The idea of homosexual seduction, or that sexuality can be changed, has been debunked multiple times in psychological academic discourse. Although scientific research shows that LGBTQ people do not molest children at higher rates than heterosexuals, anti-LGBTQ groups have pushed the purported link in popular culture over multiple decades going back to the times before World War II. The allegation that having an LGBTQ identity is caused by, causes, or otherwise contributes to pedophilia has continued as a matter of ideological faith into the 21st century.

In 2010, 13 US organizations, including the American Academy of Pediatrics (AAP), signed an open letter which opposed attempts by anti-LGBTQ groups to promote this conspiracy theory, in order to "protect the safety and emotional well-being of students", including those who are LGBTQ. According to Sarah Kate Ellis, head of the LGBTQQ advocacy group GLAAD, this conspiracy theory has already caused an "uptick in violence against the [LGBTQ] community."

== Scientific background ==
Scientific research has shown that LGBTQ people do not molest children at higher rates than people who are not LGBTQ. Scientists do not view sexual orientation as a choice. Although there is not yet complete understanding of the causes of sexual orientation, the evidence supporting biological causes is much stronger than that supporting social factors, and there is little or no evidence supporting the theory that homosexuality can be acquired through social or sexual contact with homosexual adults. Evidence for the impact of the post-natal social environment and early childhood experiences on sexual orientation is also weak, especially for males. In contrast, there is evidence that homosexual attractions precede behavior, usually by a few years.

Research has also shown that people who possess negative attitudes towards homosexuals are more prone to believe that homosexuality is the result of social influences, such as early sexual experiences. Bailey et al. state, "a belief in the recruitment hypothesis has often been associated with strongly negative attitudes toward homosexual people", and those who make this argument generally do not explain an empirical basis for this belief.

== History ==
The theory originated in the early 20th century's work of German psychologists such as Albert Moll and Emil Kraepelin on adolescent sexuality, and was used in the early work attempting to explain the phenomenon of male prostitution. It played an important role in population regeneration efforts after the First World War in Germany and informed homophobic policies in Nazi Germany.

In the 19th century, German psychologists Magnus Hirschfeld and Karl Heinrich Ulrichs had argued for the inborn nature of homosexuality. Challenging the idea of inborn and fixed sexuality, Sigmund Freud theorised that humans were inherently bisexual, and then became either heterosexual or homosexual as a result of childhood experiences. Freud argued that same-sex attraction and experimentation were essential parts of development, with heterosexuality being the preferable outcome. Although he argued that homosexuality should not be thought of as an illness, his focus on how the social environment may shift sexual identity inspired theories behind homosexual seduction.

Opposing the inborn nature of sexuality put forward by Hirschfeld and Ulrichs, other psychologists including Max Dessoir, Albert Moll and Emil Kraepelin built on Freud's conception of teenage sexuality as indeterminate and susceptible to social influence. They recognised that same-sex activities such as kisses and hugs formed an integral part of development, but felt these acts should stop as young people come of age. They argued that if vulnerable adolescents came in contact with same-sex seduction, homosexual attraction might become permanently fixed. This painted homosexual seduction as a danger to young people.

In Germany in the 1920s, there was concern about the First World War's detrimental psychological effects on men. The possible spread of homosexuality posed a threat to marriage and childbirth, which were both perceived as essential aspects of the regeneration of post-war society. Therefore, scholarship produced at the time aimed to prove that homosexuality was a threat to the regeneration of society but its spread could be stopped.

In the USSR in 1933, Article 121 was added to the Soviet Union's criminal code, making male homosexuality a crime punishable by up to five years in prison with hard labor. Though the precise reason for Article 121 is in some dispute among historians, government statements made about the law tended to confuse homosexuality with pedophilia. The law remained intact until after the dissolution of the Soviet Union when it was repealed in 1993 by the Russian Federation.

In the post-war period, similar sentiments emerged in the USA; 21 states and the District of Columbia enacted laws between 1947 and 1955 which targeted gay and bisexual men as "sexual psychopaths". Many of these statutes conflated homosexuality with pedophilia. As part of the anti-communist "lavender scare," the 1950 Hoey committee wrote to and interviewed medical personnel to ascertain, among other things, whether homosexual people would seduce younger men and women. The committee's final report, Employment of Homosexuals and Other Sex Perverts in Government, included the accusation that homosexuals were a risk to younger people, and that, "One homosexual can pollute a Government office."

By 1952, the first Diagnostic and Statistical Manual of Mental Disorders, published by the American Psychiatric Association, officially classified homosexuality as a "sociopathic personality disturbance." In her investigation into the lavender scare in Prologue Magazine, Judith Adkins claimed this framing contributed to increased persecution and prejudice in the following decades.

In 1958 to 1965, the Florida Legislative Investigation Committee, which had previously fought desegregation and attempted to investigate suspected communists, targeted LGBTQ people in Florida schools, arguing they were converting children to a homosexual lifestyle. Hugh Ryan has argued that it was common for racist groups to move onto LGBT+ people, under the guise of protecting children, when their campaigns against black people failed, saying, "They realize that this works, that this is the issue that will create a 'political moral majority.'"

In 1961, the dramatic short social guidance propaganda film Boys Beware was released through Sid Davis Productions with the cooperation of the city's police department and the Inglewood Unified School District. The film was narrated by a police detective on his way to a school meeting to discuss the issue of sexual predators who attempt to lure adolescent males. It attempted to educate about an alleged danger to young boys from predatory homosexuals.

In 1970, 70% of Americans surveyed believed that homosexuals posed a risk to children because of molestation.

In 1978, discredited psychologist Paul Cameron published Sexual Gradualism, in which he argued parents should allow children to explore heterosexual sex (short of intercourse) in order to prevent homosexuality. In 1982, when the Lincoln city council in Nebraska asked residents to vote on a proposal to ban discrimination based on sexual orientation, Cameron led the opposition as chairman of the committee to Oppose Special Rights for Homosexuals. Cameron delivered a speech at the University of Nebraska Lutheran chapel in which he stated that a four-year-old boy had suffered a brutal homosexual assault in a local mall; police were unable to confirm the incident, and Cameron acknowledged that he had heard the story only as a rumor. After Lincoln voters rejected the proposed measure by a 4–1 margin, Cameron established the Institute for the Scientific Investigation of Sexuality (ISIS), now known as the Family Research Institute (FRI), publishing many articles making unproven associations between homosexuality and the perpetration of child sexual abuse. These have been heavily criticized and frequently discredited by others in the field, often including false or unverifiable claims, and misrepresentations of evidence.

Anti-LGBTQ talking points re-entered partisan political campaigning in the 21st Century in response to growing acceptance of LGBTQ rights in the US and other countries, such as the legalization of same-sex marriage.

== Legacy ==
The homosexual seduction theory, like the acquired homosexuality and LGBTQ grooming conspiracy theories, has subsequently been used in homophobic propaganda and by anti-LGBTQ rights groups to delay the progress of LGBTQ rights, by portraying homosexual men as "old perverts who prey on children".

The theoretical link between homosexual men and predation or child abuse has permeated discussions about levelling the age of consent, anti-discrimination efforts, adoption and fostering rights, marriage equality, LGBT pride events, pediatric healthcare, and inclusion in sports and public spaces. It has created harmful stereotypes around gay and bisexual men, which have led to increasing and disproportionate numbers of anti-LGBTQ hate crimes, including violence and even mass murder. In some countries, it has also led to anti-LGBTQ legislation which criminalizes homosexuality; in Uganda, this may even result in a death sentence.

According to Bryn Nelson in Scientific American, conspiracy theories based on pedophilia use disgust as a form of "stochastic terrorism", that incites audiences already primed for violence to target the subjects of those conspiracy theories. A 2020 paper by James A. Piazza found that there is a correlation between politicians sharing prejudicial views and rising domestic terrorism. Another study in Warsaw supported this view.

The idea that homosexuality was spreading through intergenerational sex was a key argument behind the oppression and killing of homosexual people in Nazi Germany. Since organisations such as the Hitlerjugend and the SS consisted mostly of young men, the government cracked down heavily on 'moral corruption' as part of the Night of Long Knives and the Holocaust.

The theoretical link between homosexual activity and predation has heavily influenced the LGBTQ community's battle for equal rights, and has been used in recent years to justify anti-LGBTQ legislation in countries such as Hungary and Russia.

In the United Kingdom, the 1976 Sexual Offences Act partially decriminalised homosexuality, but set the homosexual age of consent at 21 years of age as opposed to 16 for heterosexual people. In Parliament, politicians often portrayed young people as vulnerable to homosexual seduction. For example, politicians argued that "sixteen is an extremely formative age....at 16, young people ... are unsure about themselves" (Earl Ferrers), and "those extra two years may well save [a boy] from becoming involved in a homosexual relationship which he might bitterly regret later in life" (Lord Gray of Contin). The homosexual age of consent in the United Kingdom was eventually made equal to the heterosexual age of consent in 2000.

In 1977, Anita Bryant successfully campaigned to repeal an ordinance in Miami-Dade County that prohibited discrimination on the basis of sexual orientation. Her campaign was based upon allegations of homosexual recruitment. Writing about Bryant's efforts to repeal a Florida anti-discrimination law in the Journal of Social History, Michel Boucai wrote that "Bryant's organization, Save Our Children, framed the law as an endorsement of immorality and a license for 'recruitment'." Other people and organisations that were influenced by homosexual seduction theory include Judith Reisman, Paul Cameron, the Traditional Values Coalition and the Abiding Truth Ministries.

In 1983, the Daily Mail reported that a copy of a book entitled Jenny lives with Eric and Martin, portraying a young girl who lives with her father and his male partner, was provided in a school library run by the Labour-controlled Inner London Education Authority. In reality the book found by the Daily Mail turned out to be in a ILEA teachers' resource centre and never seen or used by children. In 1986, UK tabloid The Sun described the children's book as a "vile" and "perverted" threat to British children. Of the incident, Colin Clew wrote, "To the British media, it was nothing more than a homosexual recruiting manual that sought to undermine Western civilisation as we know it."

By 1987, both the UK's right-wing media and the Conservative Party had begun increasingly criticizing the Labour Party for supporting minorities such as LGBTQ people, describing them as part of a "loony left" intent on destroying British values. Recounting the period, writer Matthew Todd argued that, "Thatcher presided over and took advantage of the most devastatingly homophobic time in recent British history" with the help of The Sun editor Kelvin MacKenzie, amounting to "a campaign of deeply unpleasant propaganda" which resulted in the passing of Section 28 in 1988.

During a 1987 debate for Section 28, Dame Jill Knight of Collingtree said in Parliament, "Millions outside Parliament object to little children being perverted, diverted or converted from normal family life to a lifestyle which is desperately dangerous for society and extremely dangerous for them." Section 28 proposed a ban on local authorities "[promoting] the teaching in any maintained school of the acceptability of homosexuality as a pretended family relationship" and was only repealed in 2003 (2000 in Scotland). It caused many organisations such as lesbian, gay, bisexual and transgender student support groups to close, limit their activities or self-censor.

Oregon's proposed 1992 Ballot Measure 9 contained language that would have added anti-LGBTQ rhetoric to the state Constitution. U.S. writer Judith Reisman justified her support for the measure, citing "a clear avenue for the recruitment of children" by LGBTQ people.

A small newspaper in Uganda's capital attracted international attention in 2010 when it outed 100 gay people alongside a banner that said, "Hang them", and claimed that homosexuals aimed to "recruit" Ugandan children, and that schools had "been penetrated by gay activists to recruit kids." According to gay rights activists, many Ugandans were attacked afterward as a result of their real or perceived sexual orientation. Minorities activist David Kato, who was outed in the article and a co-plaintiff in the lawsuit against the paper, was subsequently murdered at home by an intruder and an international outcry resulted.

In 1998, The Onion parodied the idea of "homosexual recruitment" in an article titled "'98 Homosexual-Recruitment Drive Nearing Goal", saying "Spokespersons for the National Gay & Lesbian Recruitment Task Force announced Monday that more than 288,000 straights have been converted to homosexuality since January 1, 1998, putting the group well on pace to reach its goal of 350,000 conversions by the end of the year." According to Mimi Marinucci, most US adults who support gay rights would recognize the story as satire due to unrealistic details. The Westboro Baptist Church passed along the story as fact, citing it as evidence of a gay conspiracy.

Recent protests and attacks against drag queens have cited a variation of the homosexual seduction theory as a reason for their opposition; neo-Nazis in Florida have also used this to recruit new members. Due to the increasing attention paid to drag performers since 2019, right-wing figures such as Chaya Raichik, Matt Walsh, Tucker Carlson, Michael Knowles, Dennis Prager, Candace Owens, and Ben Shapiro, began to link drag queens to the LGBTQ grooming conspiracy theory, calling to limit their visibility. In subsequent years, some of the states of the United States of America (with a Republican majority) proposed and approved various laws with the aim of limiting the performances of drag queens in public and prevent them performing for audiences which include children.

Utah state Senator Daniel Thatcher has said of the homosexual seduction trope, "This idea of grooming, I'll tell ya, to me — as a survivor of childhood sexual assault — I'll just tell ya, I find it personally deeply offensive."

== See also ==
- LGBTQ grooming conspiracy theory
- Acquired homosexuality
- Gay agenda
- Anti-LGBTQ rhetoric
- Environment and sexual orientation
- Conversion therapy
- Growing Up Straight
- Pederasty
