= Epistemology of the Closet =

1990 book by Eve Kosofsky Sedgwick

- Author: Eve Kosofsky Sedgwick
- Language: English
- Subject: Queer studies
- Publication date: 1990
- Publication place: United States
- Media type: Print

Epistemology of the Closet is a book published in 1990 by Eve Kosofsky Sedgwick, who is considered one of the founders of queer studies. The book tackles the question of what makes up human sexuality.

== Summary ==
In Epistemology of the Closet, Sedgwick states that standard binary oppositions limit freedom and understanding, especially in the context of sexuality. Sedgwick argues that limiting sexuality to homosexuality or heterosexuality, in a structured binary opposition, is too simplistic.

The author analyzes a late-nineteenth century historical moment in which sexual orientation became as important a definer of personal identity as gender had been for centuries. In her preface, the author examines the book both personally and historically, as she analyzes the first wave of the AIDS epidemic and its influence on the text.

Epistemology of the Closet focuses on literary works that reflect the social and political ideas of queer theorists. Some of the main authors that Sedgwick pulls from are Michel Foucault, Herman Melville, Oscar Wilde, Friedrich Nietzsche, and Marcel Proust.

== Themes ==
=== Binary ===
The book addresses the idea that there are two views that guide sexual identity and desire: the minoritizing view and the universalizing view.

- The minoritizing view maintains that certain individuals are truly born gay and only those born with the "deviant" traits share an interest in them.
- The universalizing view stresses that homosexuality is important to persons with a wide range of sexualities. This view believes that there is no such thing as a stable erotic identity, and while not everyone is bisexual in physical behavior, everyone is to some degree bisexual in their inherent qualities of mind and character.

=== Language ===
The language usage and labeling itself is a major theme and common occurrence in Epistemology of the Closet. The book proposes the argument that "homosexuality" is a loaded term. According to Sedgwick, this term "has always seemed to have at least some male bias—whether because of the pun on Latin homo = man latent in its etymological macaronic, or simply because of the greater attention to men in the discourse surrounding it".

Like the term "homosexuality", the term "gay" produces mixed results, according to the author. As explained in the book, some women call themselves "lesbians", yet they do not identify at all with the term "gay". However, other women identify themselves as "gay women", which disassociates them from the term "lesbian". This produces an obvious language conflict that Sedgwick points to as just another problem related to the modern binary opposition that is homo/heterosexual.

== Legacy ==
Epistemology of the Closet has proven to be influential on geographical research of sexuality. The concept of the closet and its epistemic effects have been examined by scholars from a range of disciplines, including geography, and used to understand the functioning of sexual relations in a wide range of geographic settings.

Epistemology of the Closet has also had an impact in the gay community, where according to the International Gay & Lesbian Review, it is widely regarded as "one of the key texts of queer theory and, as such, a challenging book to read".

== Literary reviews ==
Epistemology of the Closet has received many positive reviews. On publication, the book attracted attention from The Nation, which described it as "a remarkable work of mind and spirit", in which "the literary analyses are excellent".

According to Robert Tobin, a writer for Philosophy and Literature, "Readers who still hanker for expository prose without digressions might on occasion be frustrated with this book, as will readers whose politics differ from Sedgwick's. Nonetheless, it is probably precisely those readers who could learn the most from Epistemology of the Closet, which reestablishes Sedgwick's position as one of the most important thinkers in American gay studies."

An article in Publishers Weekly described Sedgwick's homosexual closet as "the defining structure for gay oppression in this century". The article points out the influence behind Sedgwick's strong disagreement with those who separate gays and straights as "distinct kinds of persons", with no common humanity. The article later goes on to describe how "Her close readings of Melville's Billy Budd, Wilde's Dorian Gray and of Proust, Nietzsche, Henry James and Thackeray bristle with keen observations relating entrenched fears of same-sex relationships to contemporary gay-bashing and obvious displays of heterosexual or "macho" attitudes".

However, not all reviews were positive. Geographer Michael Brown has criticized Sedgwick's 'closet' as a term for spatial metaphor. Geographers have also questioned the limits of 'the closet' as "a mechanism for understanding the dynamics of queer visibilities in national contexts where the homo/hetero binary is not the primary means of understanding sexualities".

== Translations ==
The book has been translated into several languages:

Portuguese, 2003: A Epistemologia do Armário (European Portuguese), by Fernando M. Oliveira, Ana R. Luís. Angelus Novus Publisher).

Bulgarian, 2007: Епистемология на гардероба ( by Antoaneta Koleva, Assen Davidov, Kapka Guerganovaa. KX – Critique and Humanism Publishing House).
