= Kevin Goudreau =

Canadian white nationalist

- Born: October 31, 1975 (age 50)
- Organization: Canadian Nationalist Front
- Known for: White nationalism

Kevin Goudreau (born October 31, 1975) is a Canadian white nationalist and the chairman of the Canadian Nationalist Front.

== Activities ==
Goudreau is the chairman of the Canadian Nationalist Front, previously known as the White Nationalist Front, a white nationalist and far-right group. In 2017, he opposed Prime Minister Justin Trudeau's immigration policy, and in September 2017, organised an anti-immigration protest in Peterborough, Ontario. Various local groups organized a counter-protest called "Solidarity Weekend" with hundreds of people attendance.

In 2019, a court imposed a peace bond on Goudreau after his social media posts encouraged people to kill members of the Canadian Anti-Hate Network. The same year, his Facebook and Twitter accounts were shut down as part of wider actions taken by the companies to remove extremist accounts.

Goudreau was charged by police of uttering threats in April and in May 2022. The first charge relates to alleged harassment towards his LGBT neighbours. In April 2023, he was found guilty of uttering death threats and was sentenced to an intermittent term of 60 days in jail.

In March 2023, Goudreau protested a drag performance in Peterborough, Ontario.

== Personal life ==
Goudreau has a tattoo of a gun and a swastika on his chest. Online photographs show him giving a Nazi salute. He has been described as a neo-Nazi by Vice News and local news outlet KawarthaNow.

He was aged 46 in 2022, and lives in Peterborough.

== See also ==
- Neo-Nazism in Canada
- 2022 drag performance protests
