= Canadian Anti-Hate Network =

Canadian non-profit organization

- Formation: 2018
- Type: Nonprofit
- Headquarters: Toronto, Ontario, Canada
- Chair: Sue Gardner
- Founding Chair Emeritus: Bernie Farber
- Executive Director: Evan Balgord
- Website: www.antihate.ca

The Canadian Anti-Hate Network (CAHN) is a Canadian nonprofit organization that monitors hate crime and far-right groups. It was formed in 2018 in Toronto, Ontario and has received funding from the Government of Canada. CAHN provides information to journalists and the media, researchers, law enforcement, policy makers, and community organizations. The organization is modelled after and supported by the American Southern Poverty Law Center (SPLC). Its chair is Sue Gardner, former executive director of the Wikimedia Foundation.

== History ==
CAHN was formed in 2018 in Toronto, Ontario by more than fifteen journalists, community leaders, academics, and legal experts. In its first public statement in 2018, CAHN called for criminal charges to be brought against Montreal IT consultant and Neo-Nazi Gabriel Sohier Chaput, who goes by the pseudonym Charles Zeiger.

In 2019, white nationalist Kevin Goudreau was served with a peace bond obliging him to stay away from CAHN staff, after he encouraged violence towards staff.

On November 1, 2020, Chris Vanderweide, known as 'Helmet Guy' for participating in violence at Hamilton Pride 2019, was arrested by the York Regional Police (YRP) and charged with uttering threats against CAHN chair Bernie Farber and CAHN executive director Evan Balgord in a private Facebook group. Before contacting the YRP, CAHN had contacted the Hamilton Police Service (HPS) about the threats, but HPS declined to investigate the threats due to their wording. Afterwards, Farber called for an internal investigation into the HPS and for Hamilton Mayor Fred Eisenberger to look into why the threats were not further investigated. In response, Constable Jerome Stewart said that "The matter is before the court system in York Region and as such Hamilton Police will not provide any further comments at this time".

In the aftermath of the 2021 United States Capitol Attack, a team from CAHN was attempting to identify three people seen at the riot, one of whom was holding a Canadian flag.

On April 15, 2021, CAHN filed a complaint with the Law Society of Ontario against criminal lawyer Colin A. Browne for reciting the oath of the far-right Proud Boys organization in a video posted on Telegram.

In a September 9, 2021 CTV News interview, CAHN deputy director Elizabeth Simons described people "at the heart of" COVID-19 protests in Canada, including "anti-lockdown, anti-mask and anti-vaccine protests", as part of a "far-right", "anti-democratic", and "pro-insurrectionist" movement who hold extreme views on a number of issues.

=== Online Hate Toolkit Resource ===
In late June 2022, supported by a Canadian Heritage grant, the Government of Canada and CAHN launched an “anti-hate toolkit” for use in schools. Fakiha Baig of Canada's National Observer wrote the goal of this resource was "educating teachers, students, and parents on how to identify and confront forms of hate in school and online." Jamie Sarkonak of the National Post described some of the "problematic behaviours in students that should be reported to teachers and corrected" in the toolkit included displaying Canada's old flag, the Canadian Red Ensign, and supporting politicians like Donald Trump.

== Reception ==
In October 2022, the Government of Saskatchewan said that it would discourage teachers from using an anti-hate toolkit created by CAHN, adding that "The toolkit does not meet criteria such as being high quality, free from bias as reasonably possible, and having appropriate and significant Saskatchewan context".

CAHN board member and lawyer Richard Warman sued columnists Jonathan Kay and Barbara Kay in small claims court for posting what he claimed were defamatory tweets alleging links between CAHN and the antifa movement in the United States. The court dismissed the lawsuit in November 2022, stating that "CAHN did in fact assist Antifa and that the movement has been violent,” and ruling that it would be reasonable to state that it is not a "good look" for a human rights organization to support a violent movement.
