= Stop It Now! =

American anti–sexual abuse organization

- Formation: 1992; 34 years ago
- Founder: Fran Henry
- Legal status: Charity
- Location: United States
- Key people: Jenny Coleman (director)
- Website: https://www.stopitnow.org

Stop It Now! is an American organization that conducts campaigns to combat child sexual abuse and child pornography consumption. It was founded in 1992 by child sexual abuse survivor Fran Henry.

== History ==
Stop It Now! was founded in 1992 by child sexual abuse survivor Fran Henry with the intention of having "the sexual abuse of children recognized as a preventable public health problem". Following its foundation, the organization has cooperated with scientific researchers, organized focus groups and conducted opinion surveys to research and prevent child sexual abuse.

In 1995, Stop It Now! launched an anonymous helpline for people at risk of committing child sex offences. The helpline was further extended to the United Kingdom and the Netherlands.

== Campaigns ==
In 2022, Stop It Now! launched a campaign featuring a series of short, anti–child pornography consumption videos that were shared among social media networks. The campaign also issued targeted-advertised content aimed at people at risk of committing sex offences. In the same year, it partnered with Pornhub to redirect online users who searched for keywords related to child pornography to Stop It Now!'s helpline.

In 2023, Stop It Now! joined a partnership with Police Scotland to combat child pornography consumption among people at risk of sexually offending. The campaign featured a short film produced by Stop It Now! Scotland.
