= Johann Ludwig Casper =

German forensic scientist (1796–1864)

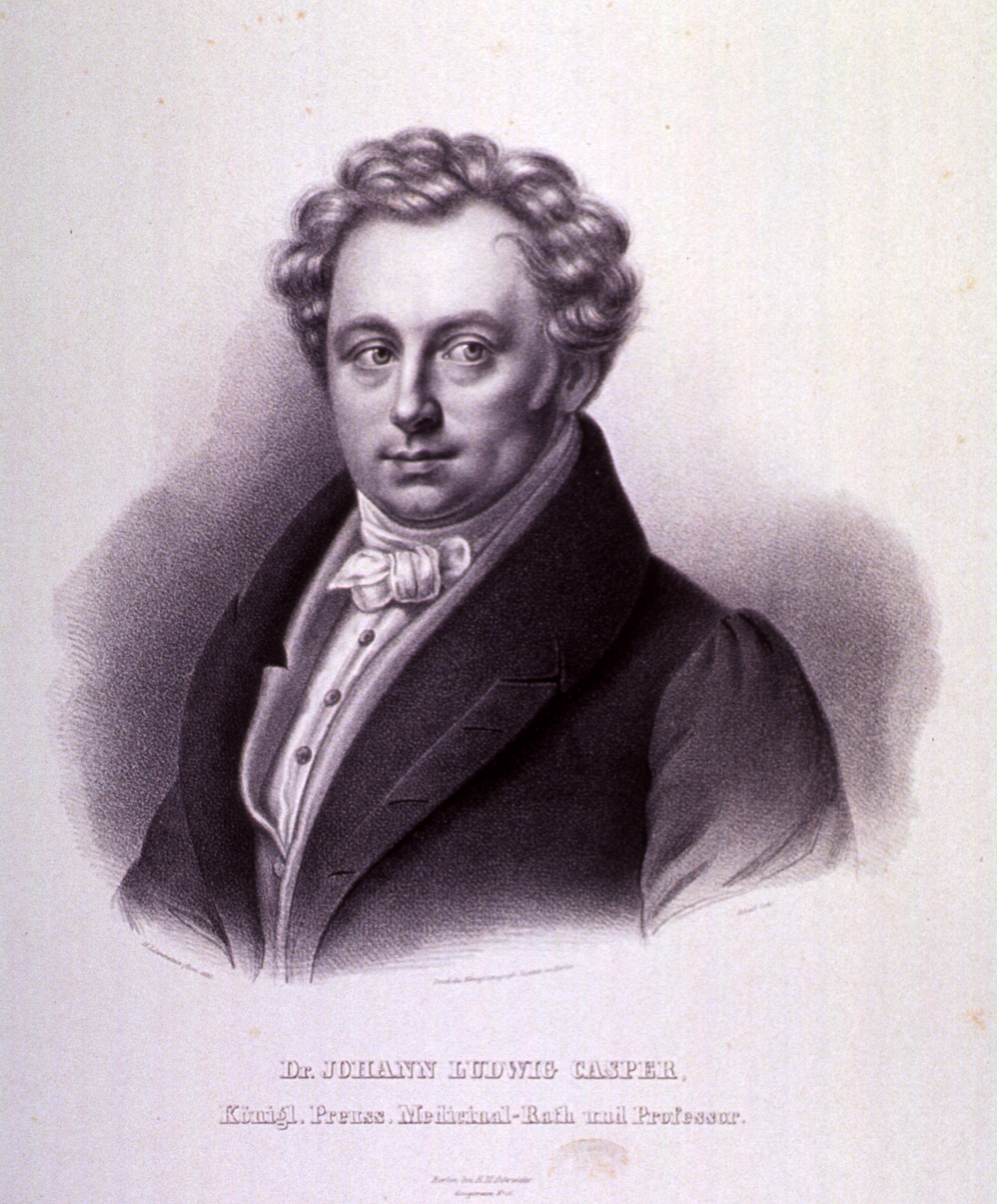
- Johann Ludwig Casper by H. Löwenstein, 1832.
- Born: 11 March 1796; Berlin, Kingdom of Prussia
- Died: 24 February 1864 (aged 67)
- Occupations: forensic scientist; pathologist; criminologist; physician; pediatrician; pharmacologist; professor; author

Johann Ludwig Casper (11 March 1796 – 24 February 1864) was a German forensic scientist, criminologist, pathologist, pediatrician, pharmacologist, professor and author.

Casper was born in 1796 in Berlin, Germany. He studied pharmacology and medicine in Berlin, Göttingen and Halle, and he officially graduated with a doctorate in 1819. Casper traveled to familiarize himself with medical science in France and England, and then returned to his native city in 1822. He became a professor at the Medicinal College of the Province of Brandenburg and, in 1824, a private docent at a medical facility. His primary interests were pathology and pediatrics. Casper joined the Scientific Deputation a decade later.

In 1839, he became a professor at the Medicina Forensis and Publica and then the director of an educational institution for forensic medicine in 1841. In 1852, Casper published Über Nothzucht und Päderastie und deren Ermittlung Seitens des Gerichtsarztes. In 1858, he proposed a consistent ratio of the time taken for a body to putrefy in different substances – 1:2:8 in air, water and earth. This would later be known as Casper's Dictum.

Casper may have been the earliest writer to include colored lithographs in books about forensic pathology. Before his sudden death in 1864, Casper published colored lithographs of gunshot wounds in cadavers in his textbook, Atlas zum Handbuch der gerichtlichen Medicin.
