= Safety Act (California law) =

2024 California law

- Passed: July 15, 2024
- Signed by: Governor Gavin Newsom
- Signed: July 15, 2024

Amended by
- Status: In force

The Support Academic Futures and Educators for Today's Youth Act, also known as the AB1955 bill, Safety Act or SAFETY Act, is a first-in-nation act signed and activated by California Governor Gavin Newsom on July 15, 2024. The state law allows educators discretion in informing parents of a child's LGBTQ+ identity, but bars disclosure being a requirement.

The law has become a controversial topic, with many parents and people protesting and proposing to repeal it. Elon Musk, CEO of X (Twitter), as well as co-founder of SpaceX, said in July 2024 that he would move SpaceX and X headquarters (X Corp.) to Starbase, Texas (Brownsville, Texas) and Austin, Texas. By August 2024, Musk had committed to moving SpaceX to Starbase and X Corp. to Bastrop, Texas.

The law was challenged in a case which was appealed to the US Supreme Court. Its status is currently unclear.

== Law ==
According to the Northern California ACLU, the SAFETY act, in addition to preventing forced disclosure of LGBTQ+ identity, would also provide information for parents and education personnel on acceptance and the creation of spaces safe for LGBTQ+ students.

== Reactions ==
=== Elon Musk ===
Avatar of Elon Musk

Elon Musk
(@elonmusk)
tweeted:

Replying to @Jason

This is the final straw. Because of this law and the many others that preceded it, attacking both families and companies, SpaceX will now move its HQ from Hawthorne, California, to Starbase, Texas.

July 16, 2024

Avatar of Elon Musk

Elon Musk
(@elonmusk)
tweeted:

Replying to @elonmusk (the post above)

And 𝕏 HQ will move to Austin

July 16, 2024

On July 16, 2024, in a statement released on his X post, Elon Musk, CEO of X (Twitter) and founder of SpaceX, said that he would move SpaceX from Hawthorne, California, to Starbase, Texas (or Brownsville, Texas). This statement was seen as largely symbolic, as they had already been moved. Musk added in a reply that he would also move the X headquarters (X Corp.; in San Francisco) to Austin, Texas by September 13; he instead moved it to Bastrop, Texas. Musk claimed this was because the recently passed California AB1955 bill "and the many others that preceded it, attacking both families and companies" was a "final straw". However, most of the buildings and workers will remain in Hawthorne until the Falcon program is finished.

Musk also said, "I did make it clear to Governor Newsom about a year ago that laws of this nature would force families and companies to leave California to protect their children".

=== Governor Newsom ===
Following Musk's move, Governor Newsom criticized Musk on X, with him posting on X with the caption "You bent the knee" along with a screenshot on X of a 2022 Truth Social post by former President Donald Trump criticizing Musk.

=== Other reactions ===
Many supporters and advocates have praised the bill for protecting LGBTQ youth, including California Legislative LGBTQ Caucus Chair Susan Eggman. Other supporters, like CTA President David Goldberg, have praised the legislation: "This historic legislation will strengthen existing protections against forced outings and allow educators to continue creating safe learning environments where every student feels accepted, nurtured, and encouraged to pursue their dreams."

== Legal challenges ==
=== Mirabelli v. Olson ===
Mirabelli v. Olson
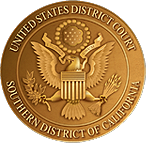
- Court: Southern District of California
- Started: April 27, 2023
- Docket nos.: 3:23-cv-00768 (S.D. Cal.); 25-8056 (9th Cir.); 25A810 (Supreme Court)

Case history
- Appealed to: 9th Circuit
- Subsequent action: Mirabelli v. Bonta

Court membership
- Judge sitting: Roger Benitez

A lawsuit was filed in April 2023, Mirabelli v. Olson, by two middle school teachers in Escondido challenging California state guidance and policies on schools mandating reporting student participation name and their preferences for participation inside the classroom. The complaint stated that "teachers are required to use 'any pronouns or a gender-specific name requested by the student during school, while reverting to biological pronouns and legal names when speaking with parents in order to actively hide information about their child's gender identity from [the parents].'", and that such a prohibition on teachers was unconstitutional.

Those perspectives are lodged within the complaint, yet were not materially demonstrated in court nor in statute as written.

The utility of student preferences for identification in communication within the classroom and the reversion to parent preferences in an administrative setting ideally benefits those whose families are not riven by poor communications. Families who suffer poor communication and/or who may be insincere about their familial conditions, and/or may have deep seated troubles may thus be moved to emotively act out and act strongly against the accommodation for parents in the administrative setting and for students in the classroom. This confounds the interests of families who are not so riven and who welcome the dual accommodation.

The Escondido school district countered that the district was observing Federal and state law, and that "The right of transgender students to keep their transgender status private is grounded in California's antidiscrimination laws as well as federal and state laws. Disclosing that a student is transgender without the student's permission may violate California's antidiscrimination law by increasing the student's vulnerability to harassment and may violate the student's right to privacy."

In 2024, the court expanded Mirabelli v. Olson into a class action lawsuit, where damages and remedies could potentially be applied across the state of California to similarly situated parents, teachers, and school districts.

In December 2025, the US district court issued a final ruling on the merits, with a permanent injunction against California Attorney General Rob Bonta, State Superintendent of Public Instruction Tony Thurmond, and members of the California State Board of Education. The California Attorney General's office has filed an application to stay the injunction, and will appeal the ruling to the federal appeals court.

In 2026, the Supreme Court of the United States overruled the lower court’s decision and compelled the state to reverse the enforcement.

== See also ==
- LGBT law in the United States
- Law enforcement in the United States
- LGBTQ rights in California
- California law
