= Chris Birch (stroke survivor) =

Welsh Arts and Theatre Advocate (born 1984)

Chris J Birch
- Born: Christopher John Birch; 1984 (age 41–42); Caerphilly, Wales
- Occupations: Welsh Arts Advocate & Broadcaster
- Known for: Personality changes following a stroke

Christopher John Birch (born 1984) is a Welsh Arts and Theatre Advocate who reportedly underwent personality changes and a change in sexual orientation following a stroke in 2005 when he was 20.

Birch has given TV interviews about his stroke on The Saturday Night Show, Doctors and Filip and Fredrik in 2011, as well as A Totally Different Me and Sunday Night in 2012.

Totally Different Me is a BBC documentary about Birch's life before and after the accident and how he began to cope with his new life. The documentary aired in April 2012. Vice also published a follow-up interview with Birch in 2017 in which he criticised how the media had portrayed his experience.
