= Eve Kosofsky Sedgwick =

American feminist scholar of queer theory (1950–2009)

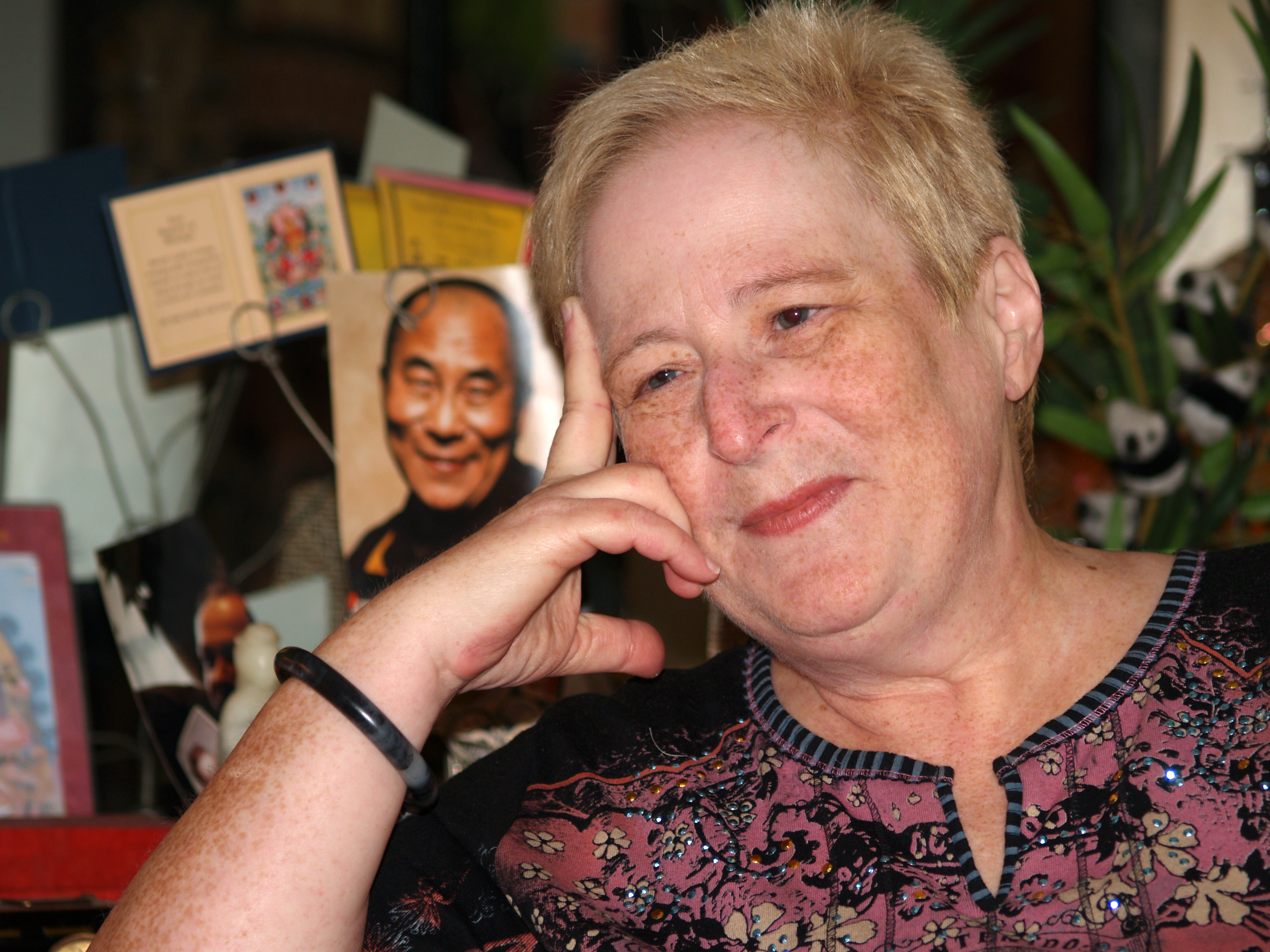
- Sedgwick in 2007
- Born: Eve Kosofsky; May 2, 1950; Dayton, Ohio, U.S.
- Died: April 12, 2009 (aged 58); New York City, U.S.
- Education: Cornell University (BA); Yale University (MA, PhD)
- Occupations: Academic; author; critic; poet
- Spouse: Hal Sedgwick (m. 1969)
- Writing career
- Genre: Literary criticism
- Notable works: Between Men: English Literature and Male Homosocial Desire; Epistemology of the Closet

Eve Kosofsky Sedgwick (/ˈsɛdʒwɪk/; May 2, 1950 – April 12, 2009) was an American feminist academic scholar in the fields of gender studies, queer theory, and critical theory. Sedgwick published several books considered groundbreaking in the field of queer theory, and her critical writings helped create the field of queer studies, in which she was one of the most influential figures. Sedgwick's essays became the framework for critics of poststructuralism, multiculturalism, and gay studies.

In her 1985 book Between Men, she analyzed male homosocial desire and English literature. In 1991, she published "Jane Austen and the Masturbating Girl", an article that received attention as part of an American culture war and criticism for associating the works of Jane Austen with sex. She coined the terms homosocial and antihomophobic.

Sedgwick argued that an understanding of virtually any aspect of modern Western culture would be incomplete if it failed to incorporate a critical analysis of modern homo/heterosexual definition. Drawing on feminist scholarship and the work of Michel Foucault, Sedgwick analyzed homoerotic subplots in the work of writers like Charles Dickens and Henry James. Her works reflected an interest in a range of issues, including queer performativity, experimental critical writing, the works of Marcel Proust, non-Lacanian psychoanalysis, artists' books, Buddhism and pedagogy, the affective theories of Silvan Tomkins and Melanie Klein, and material culture, especially textiles and texture.

== Biography ==
Eve Kosofsky was raised in a Jewish family in Dayton, Ohio, and in Bethesda, Maryland. She had two siblings: a sister, Nina Kopesky and a brother, David Kosofsky. She received her undergraduate degree from Cornell University, where she studied under Allan Bloom, among others, and her masters and Ph.D. from Yale University in the field of English. At Cornell, she was among the first women to be elected to live at the Telluride House, where she met her husband. She taught writing and literature at Hamilton College, Boston University, and Amherst College while developing a critical approach focusing on hidden social codes and submerged plots in familiar writers. She held a visiting lectureship at University of California, Berkeley, and taught at the School of Criticism and Theory when it was located at Dartmouth College. She was also the Newman Ivey White Professor of English at Duke University, and then a Distinguished Professor at the Graduate Center of the City University of New York.

During her time at Duke, Sedgwick and her colleagues were in the academic avant-garde of the culture wars, using literary criticism to question dominant discourses of sexuality, race, gender, and the boundaries of literary criticism. Sedgwick first presented her particular collection of critical tools and interests in the influential volumes Between Men: English Literature and Male Homosocial Desire (1985) and Epistemology of the Closet (1990).

She married Hal Sedgwick in 1969. Sedgwick and her husband were happily married for nearly forty years, although from the beginning of their relationship until her death they lived independently from one another, usually in different states. Sedgwick described her relationship with her husband as "vanilla". She has described her own self-identification as a “gay man” with a “lesbian ego-ideal."

She received the 2002 Brudner Prize at Yale, a lifetime achievement award, for her extensive work in LGBT studies. In 2006, she was elected to the American Philosophical Society. She taught graduate courses in English as Distinguished Professor at The City University of New York Graduate Center (CUNY Graduate Center) until her death in New York City

=== Death ===
In 1990, during the period when she was getting her post-doctoral fellowship, she found a lump on her breast. She underwent a radical mastectomy where all of her right breast and all of the lymph nodes from her right armpit were removed. She underwent chemotherapy. In the fall of 1996, cancer was found in Sedgwick's spine as well. She received treatment at Memorial Sloan Kettering for six months, where she had a series of radiation treatments to the portion of her spine affected by cancer.

By 2005, Sedgwick's basic cancer treatment had been stable. In the beginning of 2006, it was found that Sedgwick's cancer had resurfaced and spread again in her bone and liver. She died on April 12, 2009, at age 58 in New York City, after moving closer to her husband, though they continued to live separately.

== Ideas and literary criticism ==
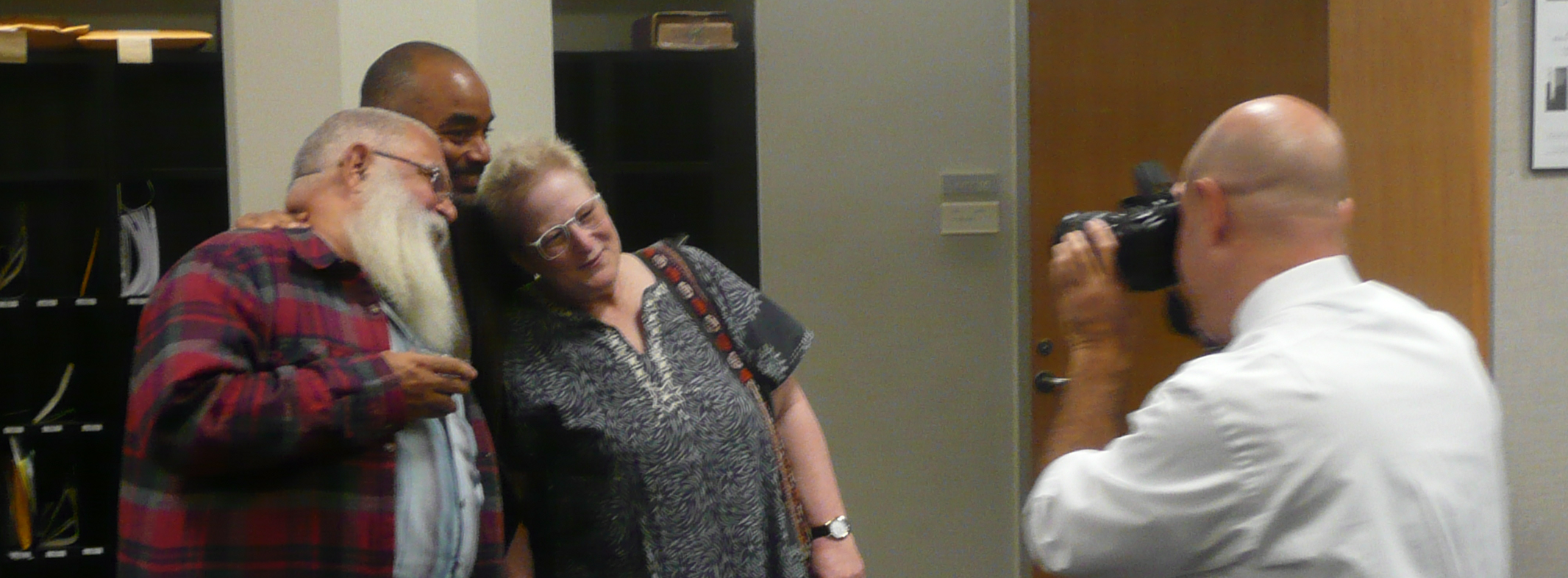
(L-R) Samuel R. Delany, Robert Reid-Pharr, and Eve Sedgwick pose for a picture

Sedgwick's work ranges across a wide variety of media and genres; poetry and artworks are not easily separated from the rest of her texts. Disciplinary interests included literary studies, history, art history, film studies, philosophy, cultural studies, anthropology, women's studies and lesbian, gay, bisexual, transgender and intersex (LGBTI) studies. Her theoretical interests have been synoptic, assimilative, and eclectic.

=== The queer lens ===
Sedgwick aimed to make readers more alert to the "potential queer nuances" of literature, encouraging the reader to displace their heterosexual identifications in favor of searching out "queer idioms." Thus, besides obvious double entendres, the reader is to realize other potentially queer ways in which words might resonate. For example, in Henry James, Sedgwick was said to have observed that words and concepts like 'fond', 'foundation', 'issue', 'assist', 'fragrant', 'flagrant', 'glove', 'gage', 'centre', 'circumference', 'aspect', 'medal' and words containing the sound 'rect', including any words that contain their anagrams, may all have "anal-erotic associations."

Sedgwick drew on the work of literary critic Christopher Craft to argue that both puns and rhymes might be re-imagined as "homoerotic because homophonic"; citing literary critic Jonathan Dollimore, Sedgwick suggests that grammatical inversion might have an equally intimate relation to sexual inversion; she suggested that readers may want to "sensitise" themselves to "potentially queer" rhythms of certain grammatical, syntactical, rhetorical, and generic sentence structures; scenes of childhood spanking were eroticised, and associated with two-beat lines and lyric as a genre; enjambment (continuing a thought from one line, couplet, or stanza to the next without a syntactical break) had potentially queer erotic implications; finally, while thirteen-line poems allude to the sonnet form, by rejecting the final rhyming couplet it was possible to "resist the heterosexual couple as a paradigm", suggesting instead the potential masturbatory pleasures of solitude.

Sedgwick encouraged readers to consider "potential queer erotic resonances" in the writing of Henry James. Drawing on and herself performing a "thematics of anal fingering and 'fisting-as-écriture'" (or writing) in James's work, Sedgwick put forward the idea that sentences whose "relatively conventional subject-verb-object armature is disrupted, if never quite ruptured, as the sac of the sentence gets distended by the insinuation of one more, qualifying phrase or clause" can best be apprehended as either giving readers the vicarious experience of having their rectums penetrated with a finger or fist, or of their own "probing digit" inserted into a rectum. Sedgwick makes this claim based on certain grammatical features of the text.

=== Reparative reading ===
Sedgwick argues that much academic criticism springs from a hermeneutics of suspicion as coined by Paul Ricœur. She suggests that critics should instead approach texts and look at "their empowering, productive as well as renewing potential to promote semantic innovation, personal healing and social change." This is Sedgwick's idea of reparative reading which to her is the opposite of "paranoid reading" which focuses on the problematic elements in a given text. Reparative reading "contrasts with familiar academic protocols like maintaining critical distance, outsmarting (and other forms of one-upmanship), refusing to be surprised (or if you are, then not letting on), believing the hierarchy, becoming boss." Rita Felski argues that reparative reading can be defined as "a stance that looks to a work of art for solace and replenishment rather than viewing it as something to be interrogated and indicted." Felski's claims around postcritique and postcritical reading draw heavily on Sedgwick's reparative approach.

== Body of work ==
Sedgwick published several foundational books in the field of queer theory, including Between Men: English Literature and Male Homosocial Desire (1985), Epistemology of the Closet (1990), and Tendencies (1993). Sedgwick also coedited several volumes and published a book of poetry Fat Art, Thin Art (1994) as well as A Dialogue on Love (1999). Her first book, The Coherence of Gothic Conventions (1986), was a revision of her doctoral thesis. Her last book Touching Feeling (2003) maps her interest in affect, pedagogy, and performativity. Jonathan Goldberg edited her late essays and lectures, many of which are segments from an unfinished study of Proust. According to Goldberg, these late writings also examine such subjects as Buddhism, object relations and affect theory, psychoanalytic writers such as Melanie Klein, Silvan Tomkins, D.W. Winnicott, and Michael Balint, the poetry of C. P. Cavafy, philosophical Neoplatonism, and identity politics.

=== Between Men: English Literature and Male Homosocial Desire (1985) ===
According to Sedgwick, Between Men demonstrates "the immanence of men's same-sex bonds, and their prohibitive structuration, to male-female bonds in nineteenth-century English literature."

The book explores the oppressive effects on women and men of a cultural system where male-male desire could become intelligible only by being routed through nonexistent desire involving a woman.

Sedgwick's "male homosocial desire" referred to all male bonds. Sedgwick used the sociological neologism "homosocial" to distinguish from "homosexual" and to connote a form of male bonding often accompanied by a fear or hatred of homosexuality, rejecting the then-available lexical and conceptual alternatives to challenge the idea that hetero-, bi- and homosexual men and experiences could be easily differentiated. She argued that one could not readily distinguish these three categories from one another, since what might be conceptualized as "erotic" depended on an "unpredictable, ever-changing array of local factors."

=== Epistemology of the Closet (1990) ===
Sedgwick's inspiration for this book came from reading D. A. Miller's essay, 'Secret Subjects, Open Subjects', subsequently included in The Novel and the Police (1988).

In Epistemology of the Closet, Sedgwick argues that "virtually any aspect of modern Western culture must be not merely incomplete, but damaged in its central substance, to the degree that it does not incorporate a critical analysis of modern homo/heterosexual definition." According to Sedgwick, the attempt to define sexuality has become so tediously argued over because of a lasting incoherence "between seeing homo/heterosexual definition on the one hand as an issue of active importance primarily for a small, distinct, relatively fixed homosexual minority ... [and] seeing it on the other hand as an issue of continuing, determinative importance in the lives of people across the spectrum of sexualities."

=== "Jane Austen and the Masturbating Girl" ===
Sedgwick is perhaps best known not for her books, but rather for an article she published in 1991, "Jane Austen and the Masturbating Girl." The very title of her article attracted much attention from the media, most of it very negative. The conservative American cultural critic Roger Kimball used the title of her article as evidence of left-wing "corruption" in higher education in his 1990 book Tenured Radicals, when Sedgwick delivered a talk on her upcoming article at a conference of the Modern Language Association in late 1989. When Tenured Radicals was published in April 1990, Sedgwick's little known speech at the Modern Language Association suddenly became famous. Sedgwick felt Kimball's criticism of her in Tenured Radicals was highly unfair, given she had not actually written the article, which was published only in the summer of 1991, and therefore he dismissed her article only on the basis of the title. The British critic Robert Irvine wrote that much of the negative reaction that "Jane Austen and the Masturbating Girl" generated, which became the subject of heated debate in the American "culture war" between liberals and conservatives, was due to the fact that many people could not accept the thesis that Jane Austen had anything to do with sex.

In her article, Sedgwick juxtaposed three treatments of female suffering, namely Marianne Dashwood's emotional frenzy when Willoughby abandons her in Sense and Sensibility, a 19th-century French medical account of the "cure" inflicted on a girl who liked to masturbate, and the critic Tony Tanner's "vengeful" treatment of Emma Woodhouse as a woman who had to be taught her place. Sedgwick argued that by the middle of the 18th century, the "sexual identity" of the onanist was well established in British disclosures and that Austen writing at the beginning of the 19th century would have been familiar with it. Sedgwick used Austen's description of Marianne Dashwood, whose "eyes were in constant inquiry", whose "mind was equally abstracted from everything actually before them" as she was "restless and dissatisfied" and unable to sit still. She then compared Sense and Sensibility with the 1881 document "Onanism and Nervous Disorders in Two Little Girls" where the patient X has a "roving eye", "cannot keep still" and is "incapable of anything". In Sedgwick's viewpoint, the description of Patient X, who could not stop masturbating and was in a constant state of hysteria as the doctor tried to keep her from masturbating by such methods as having her hands tied together, closely matched Austen's description of Marianne Dashwood. Sedgwick argued that both patient X and Dashwood were seen as suffering from an excess of sexuality that needed to be brought under control, arguing that though Elinor Dashwood did things considerably more gently than the doctor who repeatedly burned Patient X's clitoris both were agents of discipline and control.

Sedgwick argued that the pleasure that Austen's readers take from Marianne's suffering is typical of Austen scholarship, which was centered around what Sedgwick called the central theme of "A Girl Being Taught a Lesson". As a prime example of what she called the "Victorian sadomasochistic pornography" of Austen scholarship, she used Tanner's treatment of Emma Woodhouse as a woman who has to be taught her place. Furthermore, Sedgwick accused Austen scholars of presenting Austen herself as a "punishable girl" full of a "self-pleasing sexuality" who was ever ready to be "violated". Sedgwick ended her essay by writing that most Austen scholars wanted to de-eroticize her books, as she argued there was an implicit lesbian sexual tension between the Dashwood sisters, and scholars needed to stop repressing the "homo-erotic longing" contained in Austen's novels.

=== Tendencies (1993) ===
In 1993, Duke University Press published a collection of Sedgwick's essays from the 1980s and early 1990s. The book was the first entry in Duke's influential "Series Q", which was initially edited by Michele Aina Barale, Jonathan Goldberg, Michael Moon, and Sedgwick herself. The essays span a wide range of genres, including elegies for activists and scholars who died of AIDS, performance pieces, and academic essays on topics such as sado-masochism, poetics and masturbation. In Tendencies, Sedgwick first publicly embraces the word 'queer', defining it as: "the open mesh of possibilities, gaps, overlaps, dissonances and resonances, lapses and excesses of meaning when the constituent elements of anyone's gender, of anyone's sexuality aren't made (or can't be made) to signify monolithically."

According to trans theorist Jay Prosser, Tendencies is also relevant, for it is here that Sedgwick "has revealed her personal transgendered investment lying at and as the great heart of her queer project." He goes on to quote Sedgwick:

Nobody knows more fully, more fatalistically than a fat woman how unbridgeable the gap is between the self we see and the self as whom we are seen... and no one can appreciate more fervently the act of magical faith by which it may be possible, at last, to assert and believe, against every social possibility, that the self we see can be made visible as if through our own eyes to the people who see us... Dare I, after this half-decade, call it with all a fat woman's defiance, my identity? – as a gay man.

=== A Dialogue on Love (1999) ===
In 1991, Sedgwick was diagnosed with breast cancer and subsequently wrote the book A Dialogue on Love. Sedgwick recounts the therapy she undergoes, her feelings toward death, depression, and her gender uncertainty before her mastectomy and chemotherapy. The book incorporates both poetry and prose, as well as Sedgwick's own words and her therapist's notes. Though the title connotes the Platonic dialogues, the form of the book was inspired by James Merrill's "Prose of Departure" which followed a seventeenth-century Japanese form of persiflage known as haibun. Sedgwick uses the form of an extended, double-voiced haibun to explore possibilities within the psychoanalytic setting, particularly those that offer alternatives to Lacanian-inflected psychoanalysis, and new ways for thinking about sexuality, familial relations, pedagogy, and love. The book also reveals Sedgwick's growing interest in Buddhist thought, textiles, and texture.

=== Touching Feeling: Affect, Pedagogy, Performativity (2003) ===
Touching Feeling is written as a reminder of the early days of queer theory, which Sedgwick discusses briefly in the introduction in order to reference the affective conditions—chiefly the emotions provoked by the AIDS epidemic—that prevailed at the time and to bring into focus her principal theme: the relationship between feeling, learning, and action. Touching Feeling explores critical methods that may engage politically and help shift the foundations for individual and collective experience. In the opening paragraph, Sedgwick describes her project as the exploration of "promising tools and techniques for non dualistic thought and pedagogy." Sedgwick integrates works by Henry James, JL Austin, Judith Butler, Silvan Tompkins, and others, incorporating different levels of emotions and how they come together in our collective lives. Touching Feeling focuses on not only Sedgwick's illness, but illness in general and how we deal with it.

== Awards and recognitions ==
- 1987 Guggenheim fellowship for Literary Criticism
- 1998 David R Kessler Award for LGBTQ studies, CLAGS: The Center for LGBTQ Studies
- 2002 Brudner Prize for her academic contributions to the field of LGBT Studies, Yale University

== List of publications ==
This is a partial list of publications by Eve Kosofsky Sedgwick:

- The Coherence of Gothic Conventions (ISBN 0-405-12650-6), 1980
- Between Men: English Literature and Male Homosocial Desire (ISBN 9780231176293), 1985
- Epistemology of the Closet (ISBN 0-520-07874-8), 1990
- Tendencies (ISBN 0-8223-1421-5), 1993
- Fat Art, Thin Art (ISBN 0-8223-1501-7), 1994
- Performativity and Performance (ISBN 978-0-415-91055-2), 1995, coedited with Andrew Parker
- Shame & Its Sisters: A Silvan Tomkins Reader (ISBN 978-0-8223-1694-7), 1995, coedited with Adam Frank
- Gary in Your Pocket: Stories and Notebooks of Gary Fisher (ISBN 978-0-8223-1799-9), 1996, coedited with Gary Fisher
- Novel Gazing: Queer Readings in Fiction (ISBN 978-0-8223-2040-1), 1997, coedited with Jacob Press
- A Dialogue on Love (ISBN 0-8070-2923-8), 2000
- Touching Feeling: Affect, Pedagogy, Performativity (ISBN 0-8223-3015-6), 2003
- The Weather in Proust (ISBN 0822351587), 2011
- [Censorship & Homophobia] (Guillotine press), 2013
- Writing the History of Homophobia (ISBN 978-0-8223-7663-7), 2014.
- Bathroom Songs: Eve Kosofsky Sedgwick as a Poet (ISBN 978-1-947447-30-1), 2017, edited by Jason Edwards
- Queerer than Fiction: Studies in the Novel, vol. 28, no. 3, 1996
