= Claude-François Michéa =

French psychiatrist (1815–1882)

Claude-François Michéa (14 March 1815 – 18 July 1882) was a French psychiatrist and the secretary of the Medico-Psychological Society in France. He is credited as "one of the first to modernise the theory of perversions", as well as with publishing the "earliest paper that mentioned homosexuality in a psychiatric context". Michéa described homosexuality as "the presence of female organs in male bodies". He was also called to testify at the trial of François Bertrand, where he argued that Bertrand's necrophilia was "the most extreme and most rare of the deviations of the sexual appetite". He died in Dijon.
