= 2020s anti-LGBTQ movement in the United States =

Political backlash against LGBTQ people

- Part of homophobia, biphobia, transphobia and LGBTQ history in the United States
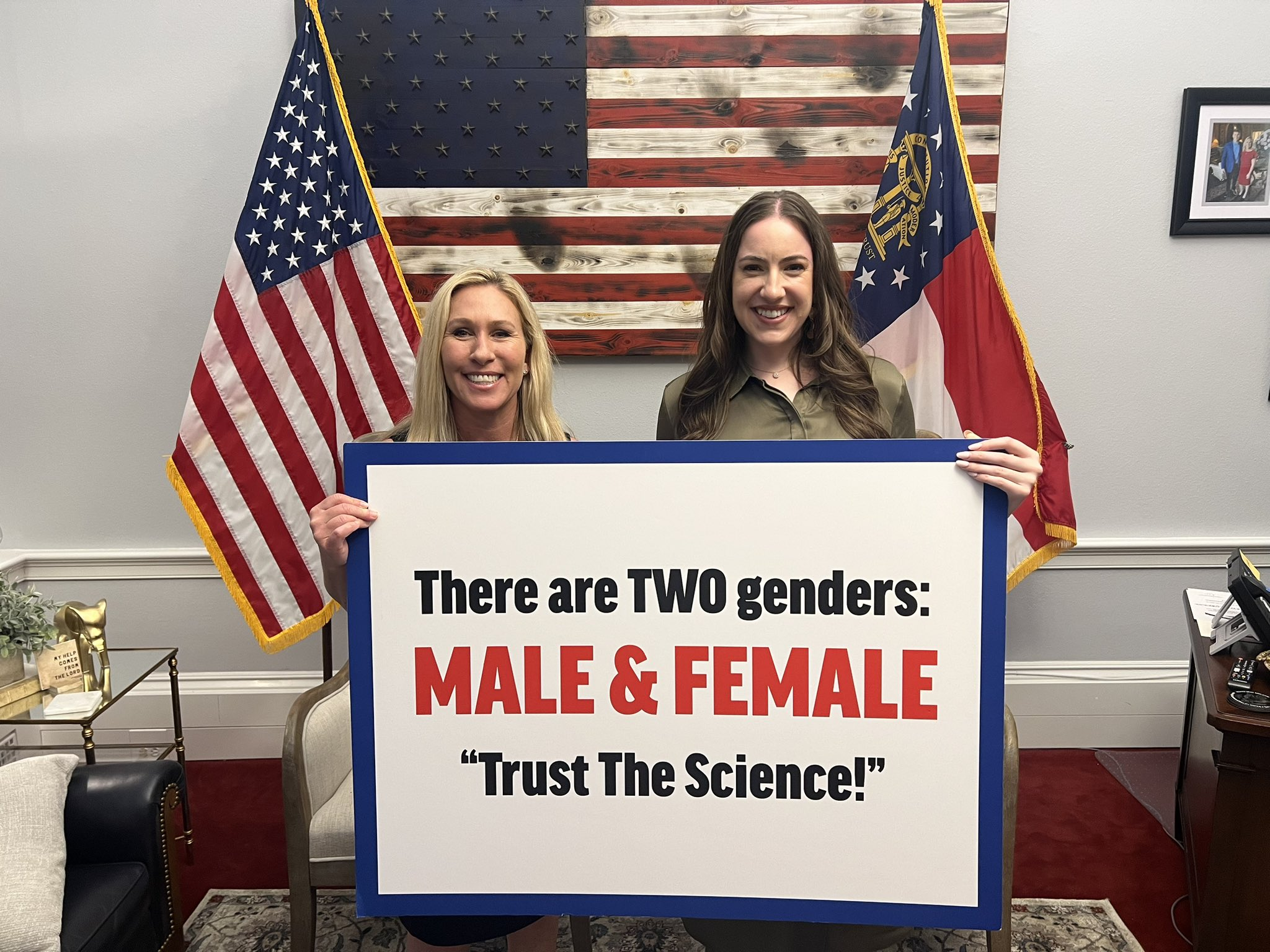
- U.S. Representative Marjorie Taylor Greene of Georgia (left) and Libs of TikTok creator Chaya Raichik (right) holding a sign in March 2023 stating that there are only two genders
- Date: 2021 (Note: While anti-LGBTQ sentiment existed before 2021, a notable uptick in anti-LGBTQ laws, legislation, and protests began in 2021. Notable events include the Wi Spa controversy and the passing of Arkansas' Save Adolescents From Experimentation (SAFE) Act, one of the first bills prohibiting child transgender healthcare.) – ongoing
- Location: United States
- Caused by: Increasing transparency, relevance, and acceptance of LGBTQ people in the United States
- Goals: To reverse social gains made in relation to LGBTQ rights in the United States
- Methods: Laws restricting LGBTQ rights: Transgender bathroom use restrictions; Bans and restrictions on gender-affirming care (especially for minors); Anti-LGBTQ curriculum laws; Attempted restrictions on drag performances; Prohibitions of transgender people in sports; Restrictions on changing gender on identity documents; Restrictions and rollbacks on gay marriage protections; Book bans of LGBTQ content; Harassment of hospitals providing gender-affirming care; Doxing; Boycotts against companies promoting LGBTQ products; Conspiracy theories around grooming; Persecution of transgender people
- Status: Ongoing

The 2020s anti-LGBTQ movement in the United States is an ongoing political backlash from social conservatives and the far-right of the Republican Party, against LGBTQ movements, and in particular against transgender rights. It has primarily included legislative proposals of bathroom use restrictions, bans on gender-affirming care, anti-LGBTQ curriculum laws, and transgender athlete bans. The movement has also resulted in attacks on inclusive language, laws against drag performances, book bans, boycotts, and conspiracy theories about grooming.

Between 2018 and 2026, thousands of anti-LGBTQ laws were considered, drawing heavily from the British anti-trans movement, with more than one hundred passed into law. Targeting of transgender people escalated under the second Donald Trump administration. The backlash has been described as a moral panic, and part of a larger culture war in the United States. Scholars have cited rising anti-LGBTQ attitudes and policies as an example of democratic backsliding in the United States. The backlash has been connected to similar right-wing developments in Europe, Canada, (Note: Notable developments include modifications to Policy 713 in New Brunswick, the Parents' Bill of Rights in Saskatchewan, and anti-trans legislation and book bans in Alberta.) as well as the Middle East.

== Grooming conspiracy theory ==
Members of the far-right and a number of mainstream conservatives, mostly in the United States, have used the term "groomer" to falsely accuse LGBTQ people, as well as their allies and progressives in general, of systematically using LGBTQ sex education and campaigns for LGBTQ rights as a method of child grooming and enabling pedophilia. Usage of this term increased in the 2020s. In the United States, the popularization of the term was linked to Christopher Rufo and James A. Lindsay in August 2021. Following the Wi Spa controversy in July 2021, Julia Serano said a rise in false accusations of grooming directed towards transgender people was a movement to "lay the foundation for just smearing all trans people as child sexual predators". Teachers and parents have also been accused of being or enabling groomers.

The conspiracy theory moved into the American conservative mainstream in spring 2022, including its use by members of the Republican Party, the Heritage Foundation, and far-right extremists and conspiracy theorists. This has been described as a moral panic and a smear. In April 2022, the left-leaning media watchdog Media Matters published a study stating that within a three-week period spanning from March 17 to April 6, Fox News ran 170 segments on trans people, throughout which the network "repeatedly invoked the long-debunked myth that trans people pose a threat to minors and seek to groom them".

== Education (pre-2025) ==
=== Anti-LGBTQ curriculum laws ===
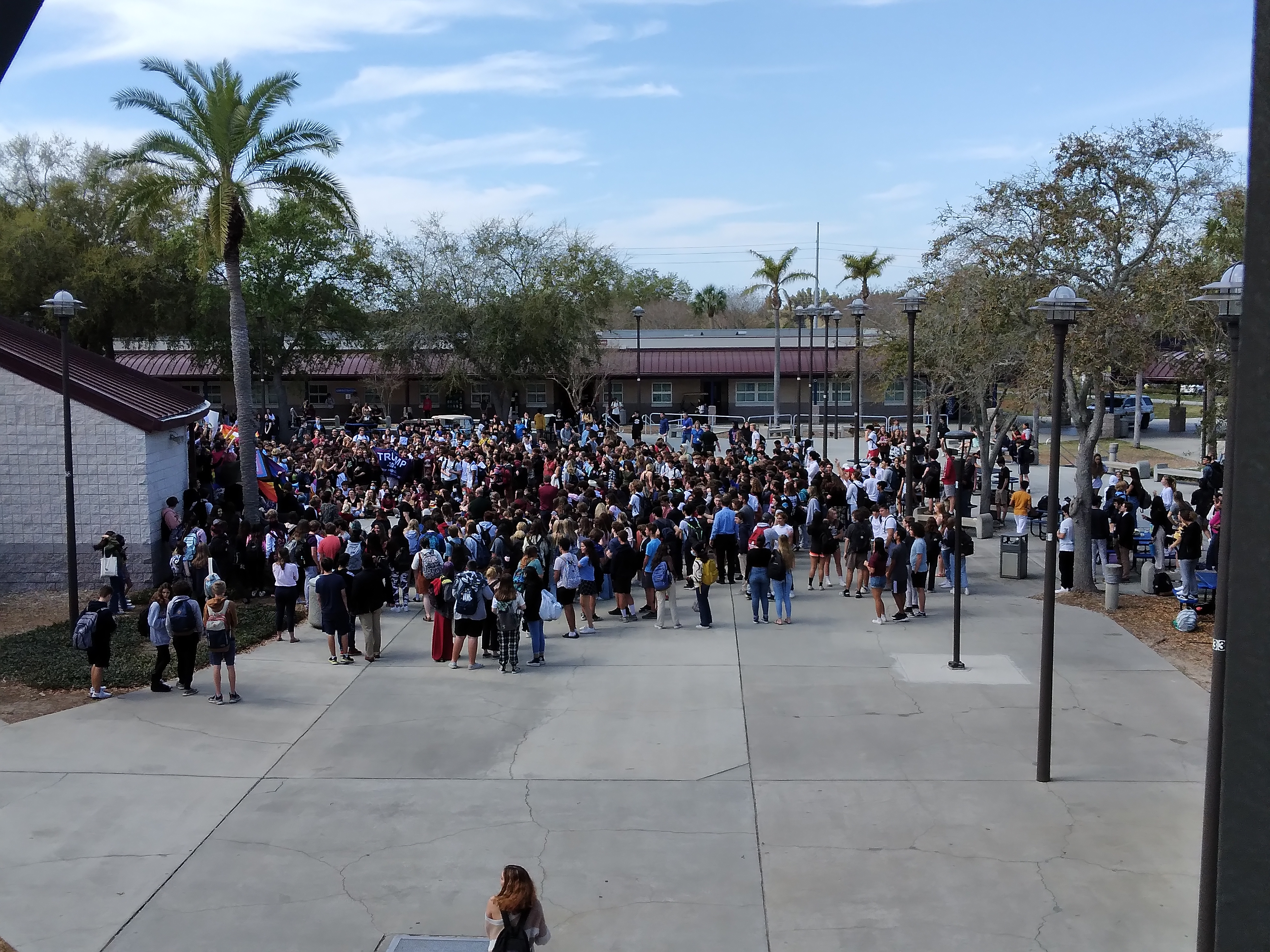
A student protest at Palm Harbor University High School against the Florida Parental Rights in Education Act

In July 2022, a wave of anti-LGBTQ curriculum resurgence saw ten such laws beginning to take effect in six different states: Florida, Indiana, South Dakota, Tennessee, Utah and Alabama. Some states enacting these new laws appear to have mirrored similar laws from other states.

In Florida, the Parental Rights in Education law and Florida Board of Education policy bans education on "sexual orientation" or "gender identity" unless it is mandated under state academic standards or as part of an optional reproductive health course or lesson. In August 2023, the state of Florida dropped AP Psychology as a course offering, due to a required section on sexual orientation and gender identity. The same month, Tampa-area schools announced they would restrict the teaching of William Shakespeare's works in order to comply with the Parental Rights in Education law.

Alabama bans LGBTQ topics for kindergarten to grade 5, except for instruction deemed "age or developmentally appropriate". Five other states (Montana, Arizona, Arkansas, Tennessee and Florida) require parental notification of instruction on LGBTQ issues and allows parents to opt-out of such instruction.

In California (where state law requires students to learn about the "role and contributions" of LGBTQ people in history), multiple protests against the inclusion of LGBTQ-friendly curriculum resulted in violence. At a June 2023 protest in Glendale, individuals seen protesting LGBTQ curriculum were identified as members of hate groups, such as the Proud Boys.

=== Policies regarding trans students ===
Local K-12 school boards across the country have adopted a variety of policies regarding trans students, including allowing fully equal rights and non-discrimination for trans students; requiring trans students to submit to a criminal background check to be allowed to use the bathroom consistent with their gender identity; implementing full bans on expressing one's self-declared gender at all, including bans on chosen pronouns and pride flags and even bans on mentioning the very existence of trans people. State and local officials in the South used indecency and obscenity laws to ban books from school libraries.

=== Rollback of discrimination protections ===
In June 2021, the Biden administration reinforced that Title IX protected LGBTQ students from discrimination by including sexual orientation and gender identity in its list of protections.

In August 2021, Tennessee and nineteen other states sued the Department of Education in Tennessee v. Department of Education, alleging that the new Title IX governance constitutes government overreach. A preliminary injunction was granted by a Tennessee judge in July 2022, blocking enforcement of the new guidance. In December 2022, the Department of Education appealed the decision, which is still pending.

The new guidance was rejected by the Florida Department of Education, calling the guidance a "sexual ideology" that risks the "health, safety, and welfare of Florida students".

== Anti-trans laws (pre-2025) ==
=== Gender transition ===
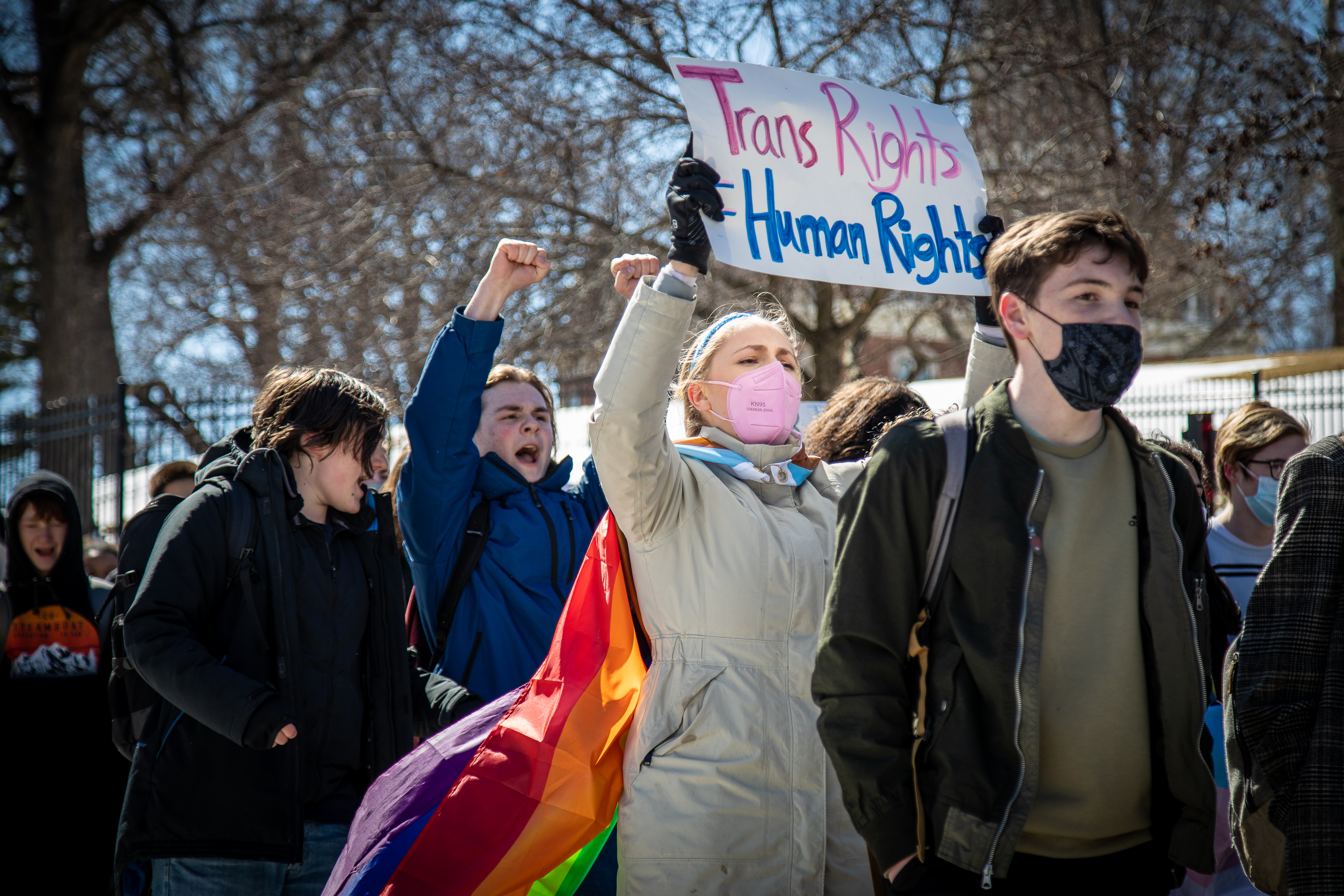
Students in Des Moines protesting an anti-trans law signed by Republican Governor Kim Reynolds in 2022

As many as 13 U.S. states banned gender affirming health care for transgender youth in the early-2020s.

==== Treatment for adults ====
Many Republican legislators across the country are increasingly proposing legislation that would restrict gender-affirming care for adults or make such treatments harder to access. However, unlike for minors, no states have fully banned gender-affirming care for adults. Efforts to restrict adults' access to healthcare rely heavily on claims from self-described "gender-critical" organizations such as Genspect that young people should not be recognized as adults until they turn 25.

As of January 2024, seven states limit access to gender-affirming care for adults in some way without banning it, such as allowing private health plans, Medicaid, and correctional facilities to exclude all coverage for gender-affirming care, prohibiting the use of federal funds for gender-affirming care or requiring informed consent practices beyond those typically required in medical practice.

In January 2024, some Republican legislators in Ohio and Michigan expressed their desire to ban gender-affirming healthcare altogether, saying their 'endgame' was to ban it completely for people of all ages.

In July 2025, Puerto Rico became the first place in the United States to pass a ban on gender-affirming care for people over 18, banning it for anyone under 21 years of age. Puerto Rico's LGBTQ+ Federation immediately announced plans to challenge the ban in court.

These states have policies making it easier for trans adults to sue their doctors:

- Utah: In January 2023, Utah stripped liability protections from any doctor who treats a trans person under the age of 25, and allowing any trans person under 25 to retroactively "disaffirm" consent and sue the doctor for providing care they had at the time consented to.
- South Dakota: In February 2023, South Dakota passed a similar law as Utah's, but without any age limit.
- Arkansas: On March 13, 2023, Governor Sarah Huckabee Sanders signed a bill giving adults 15 years to file malpractice lawsuits for gender-affirming care they received as minors, whereas for other types of care (under pre-existing law) a malpractice lawsuit must generally be filed within two years.

These states have policies that restrict treatment for trans adults, as well as younger people:

- Florida: In August 2022, the state of Florida voted to require any trans adult seeking gender affirming healthcare to receive approval from the Florida Board of Medicine at least 24 hours in advance. On May 17, 2023, DeSantis signed a law banning insurance providers from covering gender-affirming care for adults, as well as banning nurse practitioners and physicians' assistants (estimated to make up 80% of gender affirming care providers) from administering it, and banning it from being offered via telehealth. The Florida state legislature had passed the bill the previous month. In June 2024, a judge permanently blocked the law from taking effect. In August 2024, the 11th Circuit Court of Appeals stayed the permanent injunction while the matter is appealed.
- Missouri: In April 2023, the state attorney general issued an emergency order instituting a three-year waiting period of continuous documented dysphoria before qualifying for gender-affirming care, disqualifying people if they have untreated depression or anxiety, mandates a screening for autism, and mandating regular screenings for "social contagion". This has been characterized by many as a de facto ban on trans healthcare for adults, since depression and anxiety are common symptoms of gender dysphoria. A judge temporarily blocked enforcement of the order and scheduled a hearing for May 11. The attorney general withdrew this order on May 16 after the state legislature passed two bills restricting gender-affirming care for trans youth. On June 7, 2023, Governor Mike Parson signed a bill that contained a provision banning gender-affirming care for prisoners, which took effect on August 28.
- Puerto Rico: In July, 2025, Puerto Rico implemented a ban on gender affirming care for anyone under 21 years of age. Puerto Rico's LGBTQ+ Federation immediately announced plans to challenge the ban in court.

==== Treatment for minors ====
Gender-affirming care for minors has been available in the U.S. for more than a decade and is endorsed by major medical associations, but it has increasingly come under attack in many conservative legislatures. According to the ACLU, in 2023 alone, over 500 anti-LGBTQ bills were submitted in the US, over 130 of which were about healthcare. Efforts to prohibit gender-affirming care for minors had begun several years earlier, but did not receive much attention from state legislatures until more recently. The conservative organization Do No Harm was influential in developing model legislation that appeared starting in 2022 in Arkansas, Florida, Iowa, Mississippi, Montana, New Hampshire, and West Virginia legislatures.

In February 2024, the American Psychological Association approved a policy statement supporting unobstructed access to health care and evidence-based clinical care for transgender, gender-diverse, and nonbinary children, adolescents, and adults, as well as opposing state bans and policies intended to limit access to such care.

As of June 2025, 27 states had enacted some form of ban on gender-affirming care for minors, 19 of which were enacted in 2023. However, 16 of these bans are being challenged in court as of January 2024. Furthermore, only 21 of the 27 states have complete bans which are fully in effect. Four states have only partial bans and two are currently blocked from taking effect. While some states have banned all forms of medical transition, others such as Arizona, Nebraska and Georgia have banned only specific types such as hormone therapy or surgery. Seven states have exceptions which allow minors who were already receiving gender affirming care prior to the ban to continue their treatments. Currently, all 27 states make exceptions for puberty blockers, hormones and surgery for cisgender and intersex children. There is only one state, Missouri, that has a ban which is set to expire after a certain period of time. Nearly all states with restrictions include specific provisions with penalties for providers and 4 states include provisions directed at parents or guardians. An additional 4 states include laws/policies that impact school officials such as teachers and counselors, among others.

Many Democratic states have gone in the opposite direction and enacted laws protecting access to gender affirming care for minors and adults. These laws, often called "shield" laws, often explicitly combine protections for gender-affirming care and abortion and cover a variety of protections including protecting both providers and patients from being punished, mandating insurance providers to cover the procedures and acting as "sanctuary states" that protect patients traveling to the state from other states that have banned such treatments among other things. As of June 2026, 18 states and the District of Columbia have enacted "shield" laws.

Of the approximately 1.6 million Americans who are transgender, about 300,000 are under the age of 18. As of October 2023, approximately 105,200 transgender youth aged 13 to 17 lived in states where gender affirming care is banned for minors. However, around 26,000 of those youth are currently still able to access care in their state due to court orders that prohibit enforcement of the laws. Conversely, around 146,700 transgender youth live in states that have passed gender-affirming care "shield" laws that support access to care by protecting doctors and parents who prescribe or seek access to medical care for youth. An analysis from KFF in late January 2024 estimated that 38% of trans youth between the ages of 13–17 in the United States lived in states with laws limiting youth access to gender-affirming care.

Bans on gender-affirming care have been criticized as governments interfering with the patient-doctor relationship and taking away healthcare decisions from parents and families for their children. State level bans on gender-affirming care in the United States have led some families with transgender children to move out of their states.

On October 17, 2024, Texas attorney general Ken Paxton filed suit against a doctor who allegedly provided gender-affirming care to 21 minors after the treatments had been banned for minors in Texas, the first time that such a suit has been brought in the U.S.

At their annual meeting in summer 2026, the American Medical Association's House of Delegates passed a new policy formally and explicitly supporting gender-affirming care for minors, including surgeries.

==== Bans for minors ====
Laws which are currently unenforceable due to a court injunction
Laws which only partially ban gender affirming care for minors

Bans of gender-affirming healthcare for people under 18
State	Authority	Signed	Effective	Notes
Arkansas	State legislature	April 6, 2021	Permanently blocked	On April 6, 2021, the legislature—overriding Governor Asa Hutchinson's veto on a bill that banned puberty blockers, hormones, and surgery for minors and from referring them to other providers. However, courts temporarily and then permanently blocked the law.
Texas	Texas AG Ken Paxton Governor Greg Abbott	February 22, 2022 June 2, 2023	Blocked by injunction (order) September 1, 2023 (legislation)	In February 2022, the state Attorney General ordered a ban on gender-affirming care for trans youth, with criminal penalties for failing to report suspected violations. However, the order is currently blocked by injunction. In June 2023, the governor signed a law to ban this care for minors. On August 25, 2023, a district court judge blocked the law from taking effect. In response, the Attorney General's office filed an appeal with the Texas Supreme Court, a move that automatically pauses the judge's injunction and allowed the law to go into effect on September 1, 2023, as originally planned. On June 28, 2024, the Texas Supreme Court upheld the law.
Alabama	Governor Kay Ivey	April 8, 2022	May 8, 2022	It is a felony for a medical provider to give gender-affirming healthcare to transgender people under 19 (the age of majority in Alabama). In May 2022, a federal judge ruled that the ban on surgery was enforceable. However, the ban on puberty blockers and hormones was not enforceable while the law is challenged in court. In August 2023, the 11th U.S. Circuit Court of Appeals reversed the decision, allowing the ban on puberty blockers and hormones to take effect.
Utah	Governor Spencer Cox	January 27, 2023		
South Dakota	Governor Kristi Noem	February 13, 2023		
Mississippi	Governor Tate Reeves	February 28, 2023		
Tennessee	Governor Bill Lee	March 2, 2023		
Florida	Florida Board of Medicine Governor Ron DeSantis		August 26, 2024 (legislation) Blocked (state board of medicine rule)	The state board of medicine rule took effect on March 16, 2023. Additionally, on May 17, 2023, Governor DeSantis signed a ban into law, and it took effect immediately. It applies only to new patients, not those who were already receiving gender-affirming care. However, on June 6, 2023, a court temporarily blocked enforcement of both the board rule and the law. In June 2024, a judge permanently blocked the law from taking effect. In August 2024, the 11th Circuit Court of Appeals stayed the permanent injunction while the matter is appealed.
Iowa	Governor Kim Reynolds	March 22, 2023		
Georgia	Governor Brian Kemp	March 23, 2023	July 1, 2023	Bans hormones and surgery while continuing to allow puberty blockers. Minors who began hormones prior to July 1, 2023, are allowed to continue treatment.
West Virginia	Governor Jim Justice	March 29, 2023		The bill made exceptions for minors who have received parental consent and are diagnosed with "severe gender dysphoria" by two doctors. Due to this exception, experts did not expect the ban to have much of an impact. In May 2025, Governor Patrick Morrisey signed a bill ending this exception.
Kentucky	State legislature	March 29, 2023	July 14, 2023	The legislature overrode Governor Andy Beshear's veto, banning gender-affirming healthcare for trans minors. Federal appeals judges allowed the ban to remain in effect during legal challenges to overturn it.
Arizona	Governor Doug Ducey	March 30, 2022	March 31, 2023	Bans gender-affirming surgery for minors, but not hormones and puberty blockers. The bill also makes some exceptions, including in the case of someone born intersex. In mid 2023, a new Governor, Katie Hobbs reversed course by signing a series of executive orders which include shield-style protections for gender-affirming care, ensuring that it remains legal in Arizona. It also bans conversion therapy, requires insurance plans to cover gender-affirming care and bars state agencies from cooperating with civil and criminal cases in states where gender-affirming health care is illegal.
Idaho	Governor Brad Little	April 4, 2023	April 15, 2024	It would also make it a felony for any medical practitioner to help a minor seek gender-affirming treatment. On December 27, 2023, a federal judge blocked the law from taking effect. On April 15, 2024, the U.S. Supreme Court responded to an emergency request filed in February by temporarily allowing the ban to go into effect while further legal challenges to it play out in the lower courts. The ruling did not resolve the underlying legal challenges raised by the case nor did the justices rule on the larger issue of bans on gender-affirming treatment for minors. The ruling also does not apply to the two plaintiffs in the lawsuit.
Indiana	Governor Eric Holcomb	April 5, 2023	February 27, 2024	On June 16, 2023, a federal judge temporarily blocked the law from taking effect. On February 27, 2024, the 7th Circuit Court of Appeals reversed the decision allowing the ban to take effect.
North Dakota	Governor Doug Burgum	April 20, 2023		On April 20, 2023, North Dakota Governor Doug Burgum signed a law criminalizing trans health care for minors. However, the law notably makes exceptions for medication treatment for "rare circumstances with parental consent". The law also allows medication treatment for early onset puberty and minors who were already receiving gender-affirming care will still be able to receive treatment.
Montana	Governor Greg Gianforte	April 28, 2023	Ban unenforceable	On September 27, 2023, a Montana District Court judge prevented it from taking effect. On December 11, 2024, the Montana Supreme Court upheld the lower court's decision, suggesting the ban is likely unconstitutional, and sent it back to the district court for trial. If the ban does take effect, some treatments would remain legal for minors who are not suffering from gender dysphoria. On May 13, 2025, a Montana court struck down the ban on healthcare for transgender youth.
North Carolina	State legislature		August 17, 2023	Ban on gender-affirming care, such as hormones, puberty blockers, and surgery, for minors. The ban only applies to transgender children and still allows such treatments for intersex and cisgender children. The ban also only applies to new patients. Transgender children who started treatment prior to August 1, 2023, will be allowed to continue receiving treatment. Governor Roy Cooper vetoed the bill on July 5, 2023, but the state legislature overruled his veto on August 17, therefore making the bill law.
Missouri	Governor Mike Parson	June 7, 2023	August 28, 2023	People receiving puberty blockers or hormones before the ban went into effect may continue taking them. Otherwise, blockers and hormones are banned until 2027. Surgery is also banned.
Louisiana	State Legislature		January 1, 2024	On June 29, 2023, John Bel Edwards vetoed a ban on blockers, hormones, and surgery for minors. On July 18, the Louisiana State Legislature overrode his veto.
Oklahoma	Governor Kevin Stitt	May 1, 2023		On May 1, 2023, Governor Kevin Stitt signed a bill that makes it a felony for doctors to provide gender-transition medical care for anyone under the age of 18. In October 2023, a judge declined to stop the law from taking effect.
Nebraska	Governor Jim Pillen	October 2, 2023	October 2, 2023	On October 2, 2023, the state Department of Health and Human Services announced that Republican Governor Jim Pillen had approved emergency regulations banning gender affirming surgeries for minors. Puberty blockers and hormone treatments for minors still remain legal, however applicants must now wait seven days and undergo at least 40 hours of "clinically neutral" therapy before starting them. The new regulations went into effect immediately.
Ohio	State legislature		April 30, 2025	On January 5, 2024, Governor Mike DeWine signed an executive order banning gender-affirming surgeries for minors. Previously, on December 29, 2023, he had vetoed the Saving Adolescents from Experimentation (SAFE) Act (HB68) passed (mostly along party lines) by the Ohio Legislature on December 13 which banned gender-affirming surgeries as well as hormones and puberty blockers for minors. The bill includes exceptions for this kind of care for non-transgender youth, and it allows children who were already receiving gender-affirming care in Ohio to continue their treatment. On January 24, 2024, the legislature overrode DeWine's veto thereby making HB68 law. On April 16, 2024, a judge temporarily blocked the ban from taking effect. On August 6, 2024, a judge overturned the injunction and allowed the law to take effect immediately. On March 18, 2025, the state's 10th District Court of Appeals reversed the judge's decision and reinstated the injunction. On April 30, 2025, the Supreme Court of Ohio ruled 4-3 that the ban could take effect while further court battles play out.
Wyoming	Governor Mark Gordon	March 22, 2024	July 1, 2024	On March 22, 2024, Wyoming Governor Mark Gordon signed a law criminalizing trans health care for minors.
South Carolina	Governor Henry McMaster	May 21, 2024	May 21, 2024	On May 21, 2024, South Carolina Governor Henry McMaster signed a law banning trans health care for minors. The law, which went into effect immediately, also requires principals, teachers and other school staff members to tell parents when their children want to use a name other than their legal one, or pronouns that do not match their sex assigned at birth. It also bars adults under 26 from using Medicaid to cover the costs for trans health care. This part of the bill is in direct opposition to a 4th U.S. Circuit Court of Appeals ruling from the month prior which ruled that state Medicaid bans on gender-affirming care in the 4th Circuit, which includes South Carolina, are unconstitutional.
New Hampshire	Governor Chris Sununu (genital surgeries) Governor Kelly Ayotte (puberty blockers, hormones and other surgeries)	July 19, 2024 (genital surgeries) August 1, 2025 (puberty blockers, hormones and other surgeries)	January 1, 2025 (genital surgeries) January 1, 2026 (puberty blockers, hormones and other surgeries)	On July 19, 2024, New Hampshire Governor Chris Sununu signed a law banning gender-affirming genital surgeries for minors. However, puberty blockers, hormones and non-genital surgeries such as mastectomies remained legal for trans youth. On August 1, 2025, Governor Kelly Ayotte signed a bill ending puberty blockers, hormones and non-genital surgeries for minors in the state too. However, the bill contains an exception which allows minors already receiving care to continue it.
Kansas	State legislature		Blocked	On February 18, 2025, the Kansas state legislature overrode Governor Laura Kelly's veto of Senate Bill 63 which bans gender-affirming care for minors. Children already receiving gender-affirming care in Kansas must stop receiving it by December 31, 2025. On May 17, 2026, Kansas judge issued a temporary injunction against the ban, saying it likely violates the state constitution.
Puerto Rico	Governor Jenniffer González-Colón	July 17, 2025	July 17, 2025	On July 17, 2025, Puerto Rico Governor Jenniffer González-Colón signed Senate Bill 350 which bans on gender-affirming care for anyone under 21 years of age. It also bars public funding for gender-affirming care and threatens doctors who violate the ban with up to 15 years in prison, a $50,000 fine, and the permanent loss of their licenses. Puerto Rico's LGBTQ+ Federation immediately announced plans to challenge the ban in court.

==== Protections for minors ====
"Shield" laws protecting access to gender-affirming healthcare for people under 18
State	Authority	Signed	Effective	Notes
Connecticut	Governor Ned Lamont	May 5, 2022	May 5, 2022	On May 5, 2022, Governor Ned Lamont signed House Bill 5414, a shield law that designates Connecticut as a "safe harbor" which protects people who provide abortions and gender affirming care in the state, as well as legal protections for people seeking abortions and gender-affirming health care from out-of-state.
Massachusetts	Governor Charlie Baker	July 29, 2022	July 29, 2022	On July 29, 2022, Governor Charlie Baker signed a shield law which protects access to abortion and gender-affirming health care in the state.
California	Governor Gavin Newsom	September 30, 2022	January 1, 2023	On September 30, 2022, Governor Gavin Newsom signed SB 107, a shield law which designates California as a "sanctuary state" for trans youth and their families who are fleeing from other states that have banned the practice.
District of Columbia	Mayor Muriel Bowser	November 21, 2022	November 21, 2022	On November 21, 2022, Mayor Muriel Bowser signed into law D.C. ACT 24-646, the Human Rights Sanctuary Amendment Act of 2022, which protects the right to bodily autonomy and of those seeking care for abortion, contraception, sexual conduct, intimate relationships, and gender affirmation.
Illinois	Governor JB Pritzker	January 13, 2023	January 13, 2023	On January 13, 2023, Governor JB Pritzker signed into law HB4664, a reproductive rights and gender affirming care omnibus bill that protects health care providers and their patients from legal attacks by neighboring states and expands reproductive and gender affirming health care access and options across the state. The bill takes historic action to protect Illinois providers and their patients, thousands of whom have traveled to Illinois to access essential care now banned in their home states.
New Mexico	Governor Michelle Lujan Grisham	March 16, 2023	March 16, 2023	On March 16, 2023, Governor Michelle Lujan Grisham signed into law House Bill 7, the Reproductive and Gender-Affirming Health Care Act, which prohibits public bodies, including local municipalities, from denying, restricting, or discriminating against an individual's right to use or refuse reproductive health care or health care related to gender.
Vermont	Governor Phil Scott	March 29, 2023	September 2023	On March 29, 2023, Governor Phil Scott signed into law House Bill 89 and Senate Bill 37, which establish a slate of protections for both providers and seekers of gender affirming health care, as well as those seeking or administering abortions.
New Jersey	Governor Phil Murphy	April 4, 2023	April 4, 2023	On April 4, 2023, Governor Phil Murphy signed Executive Order No. 326 establishing New Jersey as a safe haven for gender-affirming health care by directing all state departments and agencies to protect all persons, including health care professionals and patients, against potential repercussions resulting from providing, receiving, assisting in providing or receiving, seeking, or traveling to New Jersey to obtain gender-affirming health care services.
Colorado	Governor Jared Polis	April 14, 2023	April 14, 2023	On April 14, 2023, Governor Jared Polis signed into law a trio of health care bills enshrining access to abortion and gender-affirming procedures and medications in Colorado. These bills ensure people in surrounding states and beyond can go to Colorado to have an abortion, begin puberty blockers or receive gender-affirming surgery without fear of prosecution.
Minnesota	Governor Tim Walz	April 27, 2023	April 27, 2023	On April 27, 2023, Governor Tim Walz signed a shield law which protects minors fleeing from other states to receive gender-affirming care.
Washington	Governor Jay Inslee	May 9, 2023	May 9, 2023	On May 9, 2023, Governor Jay Inslee signed a shield law designating Washington as a "sanctuary state" for trans youth.
Maryland	Governor Wes Moore	June 6, 2023	June 6, 2023	On June 6, 2023, Governor Wes Moore signed an executive order to protect gender affirming health care in Maryland. The order will protect those seeking, receiving, or providing gender affirming care in Maryland from attempts at legal punishment by other states. The executive order was codified into law by the Trans Shield Act, which Moore signed into law on May 16, 2024.
New York	Governor Kathy Hochul	June 26, 2023	June 26, 2023	On June 26, 2023, Governor Kathy Hochul signed a shield law designating New York as a "sanctuary state" for trans youth. This law protects access to transition-related medical care for transgender minors and bars state courts from enforcing the laws of other states that might authorize a child to be taken away if the parents provide gender-affirming medical care, including puberty blockers and hormone therapy. It also prohibits New York courts from considering transition-related care for minors as child abuse and bars state and local authorities from cooperating with out-of-state agencies regarding the provision of lawful gender-affirming care in New York.
Arizona	Governor Katie Hobbs	June 28, 2023	June 28, 2023	On March 30, 2022, Governor Doug Ducey signed a bill banning gender-affirming surgery for minors, but not hormones and puberty blockers. The bill also makes some exceptions, including in the case of someone born intersex. On June 28, 2023, a new Governor, Katie Hobbs reversed course by signing a series of executive orders which include shield-style protections for gender-affirming care, ensuring that it remains legal in Arizona. It also bans conversion therapy, requires insurance plans to cover gender-affirming care and bars state agencies from cooperating with civil and criminal cases in states where gender-affirming health care is illegal.
Oregon	Governor Tina Kotek	July 13, 2023	July 13, 2023	On May 9, 2023, Governor Tina Kotek signed a law protecting access to abortion and gender affirming care for trans youth. Minors between the ages of 15 and 17 can receive gender affirming care without parental permission, whereas youth ages 14 and under must have parental permission.
Maine	Governor Janet Mills	April 23, 2024	April 23, 2024	On April 23, 2024, Governor Janet Mills signed a shield law designating Maine as a "sanctuary state" for gender-affirming care and abortion providers and makes access to such treatments "legal rights" in Maine. It states that criminal and civil actions against providers and patients are not enforceable if the access to that care occurred in Maine. Additionally, the bill prevents cooperation with out-of-state arrest warrants for gender-affirming care and abortion that happen within the state. It also protects doctors who provide gender-affirming care and abortion from actions by medical boards, malpractice insurance, and other regulating entities that seek to economically harm them or dissuade them from providing care. The bill also explicitly enshrines WPATH's Standards of Care into state law for the coverage of transgender healthcare.
Rhode Island	Governor Daniel McKee	June 25, 2024	June 25, 2024	On June 25, 2024, Governor Daniel McKee signed a shield law designating Rhode Island as a "sanctuary state" for gender-affirming care and abortion providers and makes access to such treatments "legal rights" in Rhode Island. The bill also protects providers from being sued for providing care.
Delaware	Governor Matt Meyer	June 20, 2025	June 20, 2025	On June 20, 2025, Governor Matt Meyer signed Executive Order No. 11 establishing Delaware as a "sanctuary state" for gender-affirming care by protecting patients and providers from bans and restrictions in other states. It also forbids state agencies from giving up "medical records, data or billing information, or utilize state resources that could help any criminal or civil investigation against someone receiving or providing gender-affirming care" and prohibits the state professional regulations board from disbarring healthcare providers because they provide gender-affirming care.
Hawaii	Governor Josh Green	May 29, 2026	July 1, 2026	On May 29, 2026, Governor Josh Green signed House Bill 1875, also known as Act 059, a shield law to explicitly protect providers of gender-affirming care and the patients that receive it. The bill also contains protections against "abusive litigation", bans medical malpractice insurers and health carriers from taking adverse actions against gender-affirming care providers, and clarifies permitted disclosures of protected healthcare information in response to new federal regulations.

=== Legal documents ===
While all 50 states had previously allowed transgender people to change their legal names and documented genders, many states in the 2020s implemented restrictions. These restrictions ranged from requiring sterilization to obtain amended documents, to making it a criminal offense to carry a state ID not matching one's assigned gender at birth.

In January 2025, in response to Executive Order 14168, the U.S. federal government ceased issuing passports which do not align with the birth-assigned sex of U.S. citizens. Following court challenges, the U.S. Supreme Court would, through its shadow docket in Orr v. Trump, allow this measure to remain in effect.

In 2026, the state government of Kansas passed legislation immediately invalidating driver's licenses and birth certificates which do not align with the assigned sex at birth of their recipients, requiring affected residents to pay for updated documents reflecting their birth sex. The law was initially vetoed by Democrat governor Laura Kelly, but went into effect after the motion was overruled by the state legislature's Republican supermajority. American Civil Liberties Union attorney Harper Seldin criticized the law as "put[ting] transgender people in danger any time they interact with law enforcement or apply for a job or for housing or public benefits" while claiming that it would increase the risk of anti-trans discrimination and violence. Seldin stated that the ACLU expects to challenge the law in court. Kansas representative Abi Boatman, a transgender woman and Democrat, additionally derided the law as "culture war nonsense" and accused it of contributing to Kansas' human capital flight.

=== Sports bans ===
State laws which ban transgender athletes from participating in the sport of their gender identity, as of June 2023: Law enacted which bans trans athletes from participating in sports based on their gender identity; enforces gender classifications in sports based on registered biological sex Law preventing trans athletes from participating in sport in their gender identity enacted, but currently blocked from enforcement via court order

Some U.S. states passed legislation restricting the participation of transgender youth in high school sports or of trans women and girls in women's sports.

Twenty-six U.S. States have banned transgender people from sports under their gender identity in various capacities. These states include Texas, Arkansas, Florida, Alabama, Oklahoma, Kentucky, Mississippi, Tennessee, West Virginia, South Carolina, Utah, South Dakota, Montana, Iowa, Arizona, Idaho, Wyoming, Indiana, Louisiana, Kansas, Georgia, North Dakota, New Hampshire, North Carolina, Alaska and Ohio. The passage of legislation against transgender youth has seen increases in calls to Trans Lifeline, a suicide crisis hotline run by and for transgender people. Some of these bans only apply to school sports and some only apply to transgender women, but not transgender men. The U.S. Department of Education has said transgender students are protected under Title IX.

- In Indiana, schools rely on anatomical sex, requiring gender reassignment surgery for trans athletes to participate in the sport of their identified gender.
- Nebraska has formed a Gender Identity Eligibility Committee that decides on a case-by-case basis of how each transgender athlete can participate as their self-identified gender.
- Texas, Alabama, North Carolina, Kentucky, Idaho, and Florida require trans athletes to compete based on their assigned sex.
- In Alaska, Connecticut, Georgia, Kansas, Pennsylvania, and Wisconsin, each school district makes their own decision on how to include transgender athletes.
- Maine gives approval for students to choose which team they wish to play on, approving based on safety and fairness.
- New Jersey and New Mexico require that trans athletes provide evidence that they have transitioned or are transitioning.
- Missouri and Ohio require athletes to undergo hormone treatment. Ohio requires that the athlete must have been on the hormones for at least a year prior to competing.
- Oregon allows those who identify as male to participate on male teams, and they are then on excluded from girls' competitions. Those transitioning from male to female must be on hormone treatment for at least a year.
- Iowa bans transgender girls and women from playing female sports. No such stipulation applies to transgender boys and men with regard to male sports.
- Oklahoma requires that any student participating in sports must submit a notarized affidavit of gender assigned at birth, under penalty of perjury.

=== Bathroom bills ===
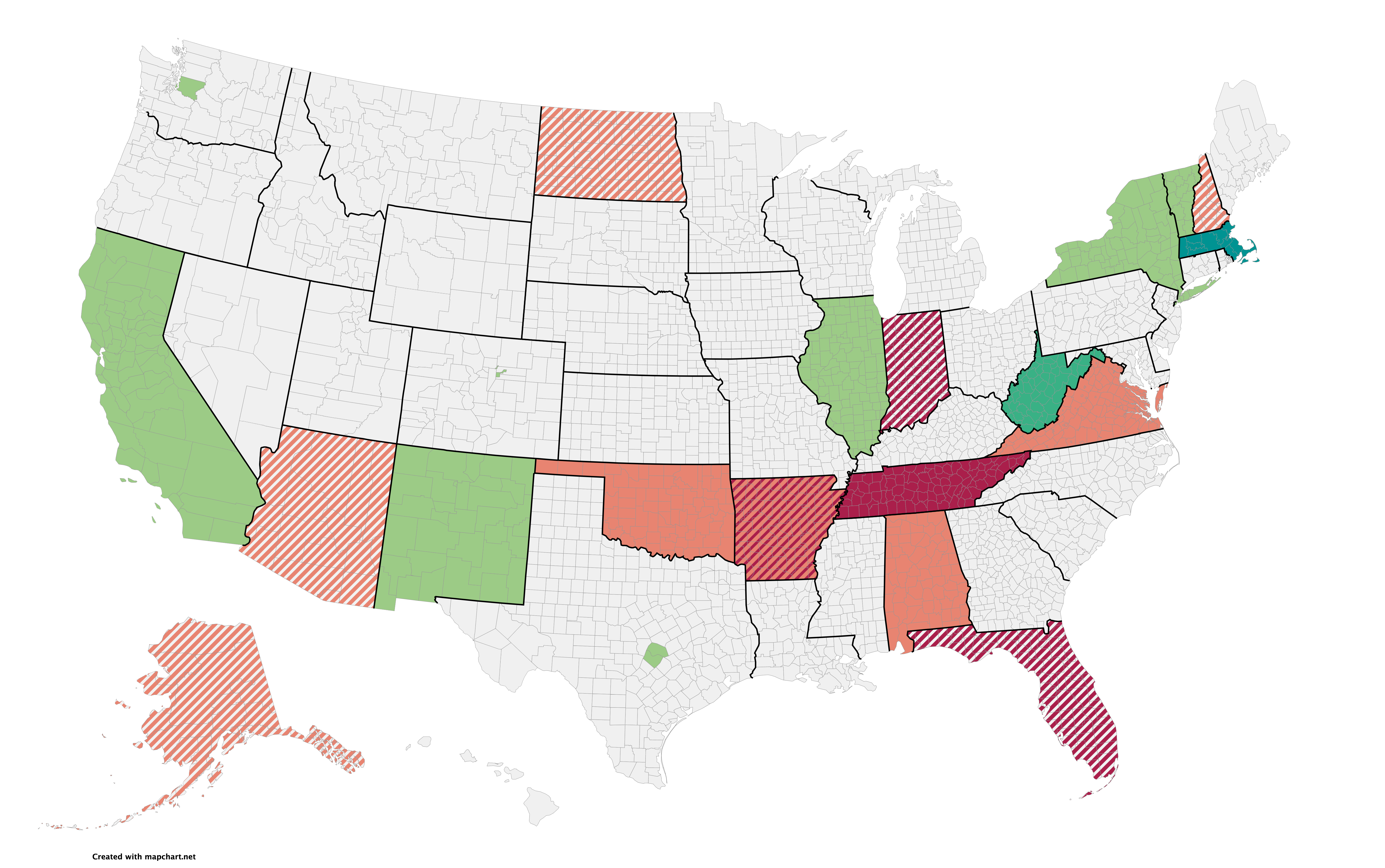
States and counties in the United States which have enacted legislation on restrooms, locker rooms, and other sex-segregated public accommodations, in regard to their access from those who are transgender, or have gender dysphoria as of March 2023: State, city, or county mandates single-user unisex restrooms in all public buildings State explicitly prohibits discrimination in restrooms on the basis of gender identity State legislation or school guidelines currently allow students to use restrooms that correspond with gender identity State legislation or school guidelines currently prohibit students from using restrooms that differ from biological sex Currently considering state legislation or school guidelines that would prohibit students from using restrooms that differ from biological sex State indecent exposure law may be construed to criminalize trans people from undressing in locker rooms or using restrooms that do not match their biological sex Currently considering bills that may criminalize trans people from undressing in locker rooms or using restrooms that do not match their biological sex

In an early example of an anti-trans bathroom bill, the Public Facilities Privacy & Security Act in North Carolina, was approved as a law in 2016. The bill, however, sparked widespread condemnation and threats of boycotts, and portions of the measure were repealed in 2017 as part of a compromise between the Democratic governor and Republican-controlled Legislature. In 2016, guidance was issued by the U.S. Departments of Justice and Education stating that schools which receive federal money must treat a student as their gender identity (for example, in regard to bathrooms). This policy was revoked by the Trump administration in 2017.

In the 2020s, bathroom bills have been proposed and debated in a number of state legislatures. According to the American Civil Liberties Union, there are currently 469 anti-LGBTQ bills in the US, most targeting transgender people; an example of which is Kansas SB 180. Several state bills are based on and closely resemble model legislation provided by the Christian legal organization Alliance Defending Freedom (ADF). The ADF's model legislation proposes giving any public school or university student the right to sue for $2,500 for each time they encountered a transgender classmate in a locker room or bathroom.

A number of the bills put forth and passed made it some form of criminal offense, often a sex offense, for a transgender person to use a bathroom, locker room, changing room, or other similar facility not corresponding with their assigned sex. The most severe of these was that of Arkansas, which made it an offense of "sexual indecency with a child" for a trans person to use any such facility if said facility contained anyone under 18 at the time of use.

Since 2021, Alabama, Arkansas, Oklahoma, Tennessee, and Idaho have enacted bathroom bills. State legislatures in Arizona, Illinois, Kansas, Kentucky, Massachusetts, Minnesota, Mississippi, Missouri, South Carolina, Tennessee, and Texas have proposed bathroom bills. The National Center for Transgender Equality, an LGBTQ advocacy group, calls these bills discriminatory.

In December 2022, sitting en banc, the United States Court of Appeals for the Eleventh Circuit ruled in Adams ex rel. Kasper v. School Board of St. Johns County, Florida that separating the use of male and female bathrooms in public schools based on a student's biological sex doesn't violate the Equal Protection Clause of the Fourteenth Amendment or Title IX of the Education Amendments Act of 1972. Previously, in August 2020, a three judge panel of the United States Court of Appeals for the Eleventh Circuit affirmed a 2018 lower court ruling in Adams v. The School Board of St. Johns County that discrimination on the basis of gender identity is discrimination "on the basis of sex" and is prohibited under Title IX (federal civil rights law) and the Equal Protection Clause of the 14th Amendment to the U.S. Constitution.

=== Prisons ===
In 2024, Missouri implemented a law discontinuing state funding of gender-affirming care for prison inmates. Florida prisons implemented a rule restricting gender-affirming care, and providing psychotherapy to treat underlying mental health issues. An attorney of the ACLU likened this to conversion therapy.

== Second Trump presidency (2025–present) ==
=== Federal ===
As part of his 2024 presidential campaign, Donald Trump stated that if elected, he would sign an executive order instructing every federal agency to cease the promotion of sex or gender transition at any age as well as ask Congress to pass a bill stating that the United States will only recognize two genders as determined at birth, and promised to crackdown on gender-affirming care for all ages. Additionally, Trump stated that he would make hospitals and health care providers that provide transitional hormones or surgery no longer qualify for federal funding, including Medicare and Medicaid funding. Trump has also stated he will push to prohibit hormonal and surgical intervention for minors in all 50 states.

==== Executive Order 14168 ====
On the January 20, 2025, shortly after being inaugurated, President Donald Trump signed an Executive Order, which defined sex in the eyes of the federal government as a male-female binary, with "female" and "male" defined as "a person belonging, at conception to the sex that produces the large reproductive cell" and a "person belonging, at conception, to the sex that produces the small reproductive cell", respectively. The order also mandated that:

- Federal agencies should use "sex" instead of "gender", remove materials that "promote gender ideology", and halt "funding of gender ideology"
- Official government documents such as passports and visas stop allowing self-selection of gender
- Transgender people be barred from government-funded single-sex facilities congruent with their gender identity
- The Bureau of Prisons halt any federal funding for gender-affirming care.
- That federal funding no longer go to gender-affirming care
- The attorney general provide guidance "to correct the misapplication of the Supreme Court's decision in Bostock v. Clayton County (2020) to sex-based distinctions" in federal agency activities.
- Prior policies and federal government documents that are inconsistent with this order be rescinded, including policies that require the use of names and pronouns consistent with a person's gender identity in federal workplaces.

Provisions of the order have faced legal challenges, with temporary restraining orders having been issued to suspend the withholding of federal funding to programs that fund gender-affirming care and promote "gender ideology", the forced transfers of transgender inmates to facilities congruent with their sex assigned at birth, and the mass removal of documents published by the Centers for Disease Control and Prevention, Food and Drug Administration, Department of Health and Human Services that mention topics related to "gender ideology".

In July 2025, The Lancet published an investigation which alleged that around half of all U.S. health datasets were secretly and substantially altered in the two months after the executive order was signed, with the alterations being done to remove messages that "promote or otherwise inculcate gender ideology".

==== Executive Order 14183 ====
On January 27, 2025, Trump signed an executive order declaring that a soldier being trans “conflicts with a soldier's commitment to an honorable, truthful, and disciplined lifestyle, even in one's personal life” and that trans people “cannot satisfy the rigorous standards necessary for military service”.

On March 18, 2025, Judge Ana C. Reyes blocked the executive order, ruling that banning trans people from the military likely violated their constitutional rights.

A May 15 memo later detailed how trans service members would be discharged, saying that they would be given the discharge code of "JDK", which is typically used to indicate that a soldier is considered a threat to national security, and which can prevent them from getting future jobs or security clearances. An August 4 United States Air Force memo announced that long-serving transgender members normally eligible for retirement benefits would be denied them.

==== Executive Order 14187 ====
On January 28, 2025, Trump signed an executive order to "Protect Children from Chemical and Surgical Mutilation". The order described gender-affirming care for minors as "chemical and surgical mutilation of children" as well as "maiming" and "sterilizing". It stated "countless children" who received such care would regret a "horrifying tragedy that they will never be able to conceive children of their own or nurture their children through breastfeeding." The order also described the World Professional Association for Transgender Health's (WPATH) guidance as "junk science".

The order states that the U.S. Federal Government will not "fund, sponsor, promote, assist, or support the so-called 'transition' of a child from one sex to another." The provisions include:

- Directing the United States Department of Health and Human Services to review the terms of insurance under Medicare, Medicaid, and the Affordable Care Act to end certain gender affirming care;
- Told federal agencies providing federal grants to medical institutions to make sure those institutions were not carrying out any gender-related procedures;
- Protects whistleblowers who report on institutions that provide gender affirming care in violation of the executive order.

In response, some hospitals paused providing gender-affirming care for minors, while others continued. Attorneys general from 15 states said their states are committed to continuing to provide gender-affirming care to minors. Multiple groups filed lawsuits challenging the legality of the executive order. In response to one of the lawsuits, several federal judges issued injunctions blocking the government from withholding federal funds from hospitals that provide gender affirming care to minors. Following the injunction, some hospitals that initially paused gender-affirming care for minors resumed the care.

==== Federal funding freeze ====
On January 28, 2025, Trump ordered a freeze on all federal funding grants, loans, and aid while those receiving them were assessed to make sure they were not promoting "advance Marxist equity, transgenderism, and green new deal social engineering policies".

==== Executive Order 14190 ====
On January 29, 2025, Trump signed an executive order "Ending Radical Indoctrination in K-12 Schooling".

==== Executive Order 14201 ====
On February 5, 2025, Trump signed an executive order titled "Keeping Men Out of Women's Sports", which directs federal agencies and state attorneys general to immediately enforce a prohibition of transgender girls and women from participating in women's sports. The order does not ban transgender men athletes from playing on male sports teams. As part of this order's implementation, the Department of Education urged high school and college athletics organizations NCAA and NFHS to revoke female transgender athletes' records and restore cisgender athletes' ones. The State Department also announced a ban on transgender athletes from entering the United States if they attempt to compete in women's sports, and that visa applicants suspected of such would have their file marked with the letters 'SWS25' for the purposes of tracking. Visa applicants for any purpose who list a gender other than their assigned sex on their visa application will be permanently banned from entering the United States on grounds of "fraud".

==== Foreign policy ====
At the United Nations, the United States under Trump routinely uses their influence action against transgender rights globally, even when unrelated to the topic of discussion. For example, in a June 2025 meeting on chemical pollution, the American delegate made a point of repeatedly disputing any gender-related language that did not explicitly “recognize women are biologically female and men are biologically male”; while in another case, the United States disapproved of a declaration supporting the rights of women and girls because it included no language to exclude trans women from its purview. Both advocates and the Trump Administration have suggested that the United States might use compliance at the UN as a metric for determining which countries receive foreign aid.

== Anti-drag protests and legislation ==
=== Protests ===
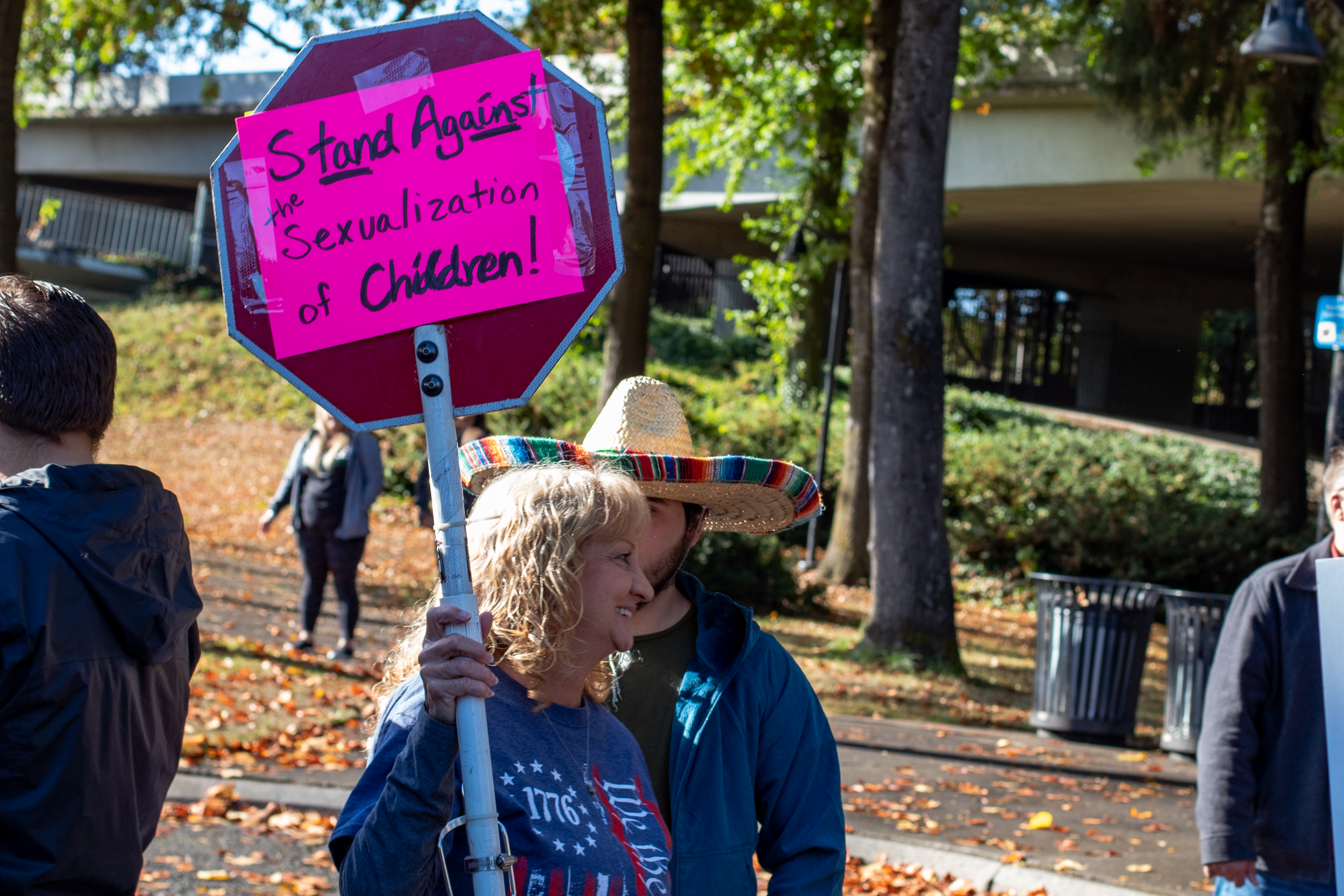
People protesting against Drag Queen Story Hour in 2022

Protests against drag performances, especially Drag Queen Story Hour, increased after the 2021 attack at the United States Capitol. The most vocal opponents are mostly affiliated with alt-right groups. Former Fox News host, Tucker Carlson, suggested that drag events could "indoctrinate or sexualize" children. Protestors also have expressed homophobic conspiracy theories that performers are grooming children. The Anti-Defamation League reported that child abuse conspiracy theory has been fueled by the Libs of TikTok, a far-right Twitter account. The Gay & Lesbian Alliance Against Defamation reported over 120 threats against drag shows in the US, throughout 2022.

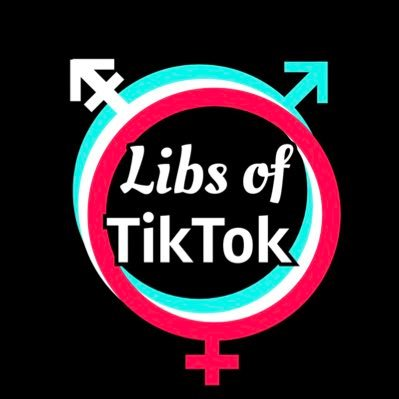
Far-right anti-LGBTQ Twitter account Libs of TikTok (logo pictured) regularly uses the term "groomers" as an insulting stereotype towards LGBTQ people.

In mid-June 2022, Libs of TikTok condemned the upcoming Coeur d'Alene, Idaho's "Pride in the Park" festival due to a "family-friendly drag performance." On June 11, 2022, during the pride event, law enforcement arrested 31 members of the white nationalist and hate group Patriot Front, charging them with conspiracy to riot. In May 2023, masked neo-Nazi groups in Ohio protested drag events in Wadsworth and Columbus, carrying anti-drag and anti-trans banners, such as one that read, "There Will Be Blood." A report from GLAAD noted there were 138 documented incidents of anti-LGBTQ harassment, vandalism or assault at drag shows in the United States from June 2022 through April 2023. An Institute for Strategic Dialogue report indicated that the Proud Boys were the leading group spreading anti-LGBTQ sentiment.

=== Laws and restrictions ===
On March 2, 2023, Tennessee governor Bill Lee signed the Adult Entertainment Act, which prohibits drag performances for children. This bill sparked outrage from the LGBTQ community. On June 3, 2023, a federal judge ruled that the law is unconstitutional. On July 18, 2024, a three judge panel on the Sixth Circuit reinstated the law by ruling that the plaintiffs had lacked the standing to sue. The ruling did not address whether the law was constitutional.

The states of Florida, Montana, and Texas have also passed laws banning public drag performances. However, all three of these drag bans were blocked by courts from taking effect.

In response to Executive Order 14168, Texas A&M University and University of Texas systems banned drag shows on campus facilities.

== Marriage ==
Map image of senatorial votes for the Respect for Marriage Act in 2022 Two yeas Yea and Nay Two Nays Yea and not voting Nay and not voting

In response to a concurring opinion by Justice Clarence Thomas in Dobbs v. Jackson Women's Health Organization arguing the Court should reconsider Obergefell v. Hodges, Congress passed the Respect for Marriage Act in 2022. The act officially repealed the Defense of Marriage Act and required the federal government to recognize same-sex and interracial marriages, thus codifying parts of Obergefell, the 2013 ruling in United States v. Windsor, and the 1967 ruling in Loving v. Virginia. In addition, it compelled all U.S. states and territories to recognize the validity of same-sex and interracial marriages if performed in a jurisdiction where such marriages are legally performed; however, it does not legally compel states to perform same-sex marriages if Obergefell is overturned.

The following year, the Tennessee House of Representatives passed House Bill 878, which would grant an individual the right to refuse to solemnize a marriage if the individual has a religious or conscience-based objection to that partnership. In Texas, McLennan County Justice of the Peace Dianne Hensley filed a lawsuit to allow her to refuse to marry gay couples, citing the 2023 U.S. Supreme Court case 303 Creative LLC v. Elenis.

On January 27, 2025, the Idaho House of Representatives voted for a resolution that calls for the Supreme Court to reconsider its 2015 Obergefell v. Hodges same-sex marriage decision.

== Book bans ==
Legislation was introduced or passed in at least 29 states taking aim at lessons that teach children about race and LGBTQ people, with most of the laws framed around putting a stop to critical race theory and "gender ideology". These laws, which use broad language prohibiting teaching about privilege related to race or sex, or systemic bias in the United States, have led to many book removals. NBC News described the use of the term "critical race theory" in this context as "a catch-all term to refer to what schools often call equity programs, teaching about racism or LGBTQ-inclusive policies". The Takeaway's Melissa Harris-Perry cited discomfort with issues like gender identity as one of the common reasons for challenges, but that "this discomfort is likely imposed by adults onto young learners" who are otherwise more accepting and more likely to think outside traditional gender roles.

An example of such bans is that passed by Florida in March 2022, which created a list of sanctioned reading material for students in educational settings, and punished any teacher or school librarian whose classrooms or libraries contained unsanctioned books with felony charges. Sanctioned books must be reviewed by the state to be free of "prohibited material harmful to minors", which critics have said that under Florida state law includes content regarding the LGBTQ community and black history.

== Business ==
Avatar of Matt Walsh

Matt Walsh
(@MattWalshBlog)
tweeted:

The goal is to make "pride" toxic for brands. If they decide to shove this garbage in our face, they should know that they'll pay a price. It won't be worth whatever they think they'll gain. First Bud Light and now Target. Our campaign is making progress. Let's keep it going.

May 24, 2023

Conservative activists urged for boycotting any company which publicly supported, or collaborated with members of, the LGBTQ community. Some of the most well-known examples included the boycott against Bud Light for a sponsorship with actress and TikToker Dylan Mulvaney, and the campaign against Disney by Florida governor Ron DeSantis for publicly opposing the state's anti-LGBTQ curriculum law. Other targeted companies include Nike, Adidas and Ford. In May 2023, Target removed several Pride Month items from stores in the Southern United States after anti-LGBTQ hate groups threatened violence against its employees. Following the election of Donald Trump in 2024, Disney removed storylines, episodes, and lines of dialogue that involved transgender characters from several shows set to air.

Under Elon Musk, Twitter declared the words "cis" and "cisgender" to be slurs and banned their usage on the platform, while also eliminating restrictions on transphobia. Anti-trans content, including PragerU's film Detrans: The Dangers of Gender-Affirming Care, has been strongly promoted by the platform. The Nation described "anti-trans hatred" as one of Twitter's "core features".

== Violence ==
According to a 2023 report by the Department of Homeland Security, threats of violence against the LGBTQ community rose in the early-2020s. The FBI also noted a sharp uptick in the number of hate crimes committed against LGBTQ people, with the 54 percent increase representing the fastest rise in hate crimes of all groups in the country. In New York City, hate crimes against LGBTQ people doubled from 2021 to 2022, and grew by 29% in California during the same period.

Violence has also been used against heterosexual people expressing support for LGBTQ rights. In August 2023, Lauri Carleton, a business owner in Southern California, was shot and killed for keeping a pride flag outside her store.

== Public opinion ==
=== Polls and surveys ===
==== 2021–2024 ====
An April 2021 PBS NewsHour/NPR/Marist poll with the question "Do you support or oppose legislation that would prohibit gender transition-related medical care for minors" found 66% of Americans would oppose a ban, including 69% of Democrats, 70% of Republicans, and 64% of Independents.

A February 2022 poll by LGBTQ support service The Trevor Project and Morning Consult found that 52 percent of American adults expressed some level of support for transgender minors having access to puberty blockers if it is recommended by their doctor and supported by their parents.

A June 2022 Pew Research Poll found that most Americans were uncomfortable with the speed of change on issues related to transgender people, with young adults and Democrats being the most supportive of transgender rights and Republicans and people in the 55–64 years age group being the least supportive.

According to the Public Religion Research Institute in February 2023, support for mandating that trans people use the bathroom corresponding to their gender assigned at birth rose among all religious groups, with white evangelical Protestants seeing the largest change, going from 41% in support to 72% in support between 2017 and 2021. 41% of total Americans held this stance, with 31% disagreeing, and 28% not taking either position.

In a poll from Data for Progress in March 2023, respondents were asked about the more than 400 pieces of anti-trans legislation working their way through statehouses. 64 percent of respondents, including 55 percent of Republicans, agreed with the statement "This is too much legislation. Politicians are playing political theater and using these bills as a wedge issue". 25 percent agreed with the statement "This is the right amount of legislation. Politicians are dealing with a real danger that needs to be addressed." As a result, pollsters and strategists from both parties warned that Republicans' intense focus on restricting the rights and health care of about 0.6 percent of the American population could risk putting off independents and swing voters in the next election.

A poll by The Washington Post/Kaiser Family Foundation, conducted in November 2022, found that 68 percent of adults oppose access to puberty-blocking medication for transgender children ages 10 to 14, and 58 percent oppose access to hormonal treatments for transgender children ages 15 to 17.

In a January 2023 Deseret News/HarrisX poll, 55 percent of Americans supported banning gender hormone therapy for transgender minors with parental or guardian approval, while 45 percent opposed such a ban.

A January 2023 poll by the Pew Research Center found that black Democrats were less likely than other Democrats to believe that a person's gender can be different from their birth sex and more likely to say that their views on LGBTQ issues are determined by their religion.

A February 2023 poll by the University of Michigan measuring support for transgender athletes among 14 to 24-year-olds found that 47% believed transgender athletes should be allowed to compete on sports teams that align with their gender identity or personal preferences, whereas 35% believed transgender athletes should only compete on sports teams based on their sex assigned at birth, should compete in leagues only for transgender people or should not be able to compete in sports at all.

A May 2023 poll by The Washington Post/Kaiser Family Foundation found that a majority of Americans support some anti-trans policies despite also claiming to oppose discrimination for trans people.

In June 2023, a Gallup poll found that only 26% of Americans think trans athletes should be allowed to play on sports teams that match their gender identity.

A September 2023 poll by 19th News/SurveyMonkey found that 39 percent of American adults supported transgender minors having access to any kind of gender-affirming care, including puberty blockers, hormones, therapy, and surgery. Another poll by The 19th/SurveyMonkey that same month found that in a survey of 20,000 American adults, 17 percent believed politicians should focus on restricting gender-affirming care, while 33 percent believed they should focus on protecting access to gender-affirming care. The rest believed politicians should not focus on trans issues at all. A separate poll conducted by The 19th that month found that 7 in 10 Americans, including majorities in both major parties and independents, do not think politicians are informed enough about gender-affirming care to make fair policies on it.

A September 2023 poll conducted by SurveyUSA and sponsored by the anti-trans group, Women's Declaration International, found that a majority of voters believe a person's sex is determined at birth and that sex and gender are the same thing.

A February 2024 survey by YouGov found that a majority of Americans support laws and policies protecting transgender people from hate crimes and discrimination in employment, permitting transgender people to serve in the military, allowing government employees to use pronouns that match their gender identity and outlawing conversion therapy for transgender minors. However, it also found that a majority of Americans support laws and policies banning transgender women from women's sports and prisons, prohibiting minors from attending drag shows and creating a law that "defines gender as a person's sex assigned at birth". Additionally, the survey found that while 54% of Americans oppose allowing transgender minors to access gender-affirming care, only 45% support laws and policies banning the treatments for minors.

A Gallup Poll released in June 2024 found that over 60% of U.S. adults oppose banning gender-affirming care for minors, but also found that just 44% of U.S. adults believe that changing one's gender is morally acceptable, with 56% of 18-29 year olds saying it is morally acceptable compared to 38% of adults over age 65.

A June 2024 poll by the University of Chicago found that 70% of Democrats and 29% of Republicans supported laws that protect access to gender-affirming care for minors.

==== 2024 election related polls ====
A March 2024 poll by GLAAD found that more than half of both registered and likely voters surveyed said they would not support a candidate who "speaks frequently about restricting access to health care and participation in sports for transgender youth."

A poll by Folx Health in August 2024 found that 90% of transgender Americans feared that the election would have an impact on their access to gender-affirming care.

A September 2024 poll by Fox News found that voters trusted Kamala Harris more than Donald Trump to handle transgender issues by a 16-point margin.

An October 2024 poll by the Human Rights Campaign found that only 5% of voters say they are concerned about gender-affirming care and 61% said they will not support candidates who support banning gender-affirming care, including 41% of Republicans. The poll also found that 70% of voters think that anti-LGBTQ+ legislation has gone too far and that politicians have targeted trans people to divide Americans and "maintain their political power."

An October 2024 poll by Baldwin Wallace University in Ohio found that 60% of registered voters in Ohio supported schools teaching 6th-12th grade students about sexual orientation but only 43% supported teaching students in those same grades about gender identity. Additionally, the poll found that 51% of voters in Ohio believe parents should not have direct control over what books are in the school library and 55% believe that parents should not be able to stop schools from teaching topics that they do not like. The poll also found that 72% of voters in Ohio would oppose policies or laws allowing medical professionals to provide someone younger than 18 with medical care for a gender transition and 73% would oppose policies or laws allowing transgender athletes to play on the team that matches their gender identity and 56% would support policies or laws requiring public schools to notify parents if it is discovered that a student identifies with a gender that does not align with their biological sex.

In November 2024, polls in five battleground states conducted by The New York Times/Siena College found a majority of Americans think society should accept transgender people's gender identities.

==== 2025–2026 ====
In January 2025, a poll by The New York Times/Ipsos showed 71% of Americans believed that no trans person under 18 should have access to gender-affirming care and 79% of respondents supported a ban on transgender athletes from women's sports. Additionally, 49% said that society had gone too far in accommodating the rights of trans people.

A February 2025 Gallup Poll found that 58% of Americans supported allowing openly transgender people to serve in the military, which was a decrease from 2021 when 66% of Americans supported it. The decrease was largely caused by a massive decrease in support among Republicans. Support among Democrats and Independents between 2021 and 2025 remained mostly steady.

A March 2025 survey by Public Religion Research Institute/Ipsos found that 70% of Democrats and 30% of Republicans opposed legislation that would ban minors from accessing gender-affirming care. Additionally, 60% of Democrats and 14% of Republicans opposed legislation that would mandate that a transgender person's driver's license or ID match their sex at birth.

An April 2025 poll by 19th News/SurveyMonkey found that 49% of Americans do not want politicians focusing on transgender issues, a rise from 43% in 2024 and 44% in 2023. The poll also found that 59% of Americans support transgender adults being able to access gender-affirming care. And while only 43% supported trans youth being able to access gender-affirming care, 55% opposed laws that would restrict gender-affirming care for minors.

An April 2025 survey by CNN/SSRS found that 51% of Americans, including 16% of Democrats/liberals, 48% of independents/moderates and 90% of Republicans, but only 79% of conservatives, approved of Donald Trump's handling of transgender issues.

A January 2026 YouGov poll found that 64% of Americans believe transphobia is a problem among members of the Republican Party, with 44% citing it as a major problem. Notably, around 60% of respondents said they believe "trans ideology" and "gender ideology" were also issues, though the survey did not offer a definition of those terms.

In June 2026, a Talker Research poll found that 17% of all respondents said they "don’t believe Pride Month should be celebrated 'at all'", 8% said they believe Pride celebrations should be "scaled back", 21% said they support the idea of Pride but do not care about the actual celebrations, and 28% said that "Pride Month is important and should be supported". The poll also found that the responses varied with stated political affiliation. For example, 44% of Democrat respondents and 17% of Republican respondents said they believe in the importance of Pride Month. Additionally, 6% of Democrat respondents and 32% of Republican respondents said that "Pride should be canceled".

== Election campaigning and results ==
=== 2024 presidential election ===
During the 2024 presidential election, anti-trans advertisements became commonplace, with the Republican Party making trans issues a top issue in their campaign, spending over $215 million on anti-trans ads and more than on ads regarding housing, immigration, and the economy combined. According to NOTUS in 2025, it was the American Principles Project who had originally convinced the Donald Trump and the Republican Party to begin its extensive campaign against trans rights. In contrast, Democrats largely avoided discussing transgender issues during the election campaign period. The ads became especially common during the closing days of the race, often pushing disparaging claims about transgender healthcare, existence in society, and participation in sports. Democrats did not formally respond to the ads during the campaign period. Former President Bill Clinton privately expressed concern about the ads and encouraged the Harris campaign to respond to it. However, he was told by the campaign that the ads "were not necessarily having an impact" and never addressed his concerns publicly. The Harris campaign had originally planned to release an ad responding, but the ad ended up performing poorly in internal tests and was ultimately never run.

According to an analysis by Future Forward, the political slogan "Kamala is for they/them, President Trump is for you" was ranked as one of the Trump campaign's most effective 30-second attack ads, shifting the race 2.7 percentage points in favor of Trump after viewers watched it. On the contrary, an analysis by Change Research studying the effects of the ads found that they did not sway swing voters. A study by Ground Media also found that the ads did not sway voters into supporting Republicans, but they did succeed at slightly eroding public support for trans people in general. David Rochkind, the CEO of Ground Media, gave a press release saying "What this demonstrates is that attacking the trans community isn't just a weak and feckless political strategy — it's a deeply cynical one. ... These ads weaponize trans-identity to sow fear and division, making our country less safe for everyone." A poll by Blueprint surveyed the most important issues to voters and found that trans issues ranked second to last among young men. An October 2024 poll by Data for Progress found that a majority of voters from both major parties believe the government should stop involving themselves in the lives of trans people and that politicians should focus less on transgender issues and more on other issues like the economy. It also found that a majority of voters from both major parties believe Republicans leaning so heavily on anti-trans ads is "sad and shameful". An October 2024 Gallup Poll surveying the most important issues to registered voters ahead of the 2024 presidential election found that of the 22 issues voters were asked about, transgender issues ranked last with only 18 percent of voters describing it as "extremely important". Democrats were also more likely than Republicans to say transgender issues were extremely important to them, 25% to 12%. Another poll by Data for Progress found that a majority of voters from all parties agree with the statement "the government should be less involved in regulating what transgender people are allowed to do, including the health care they can receive." Additionally, it found that 80% of voters agreed with the statement "both Democrats and Republicans should spend less time talking about transgender issues and more time talking about voters' priority issues like the economy and inflation." It also found that a majority of voters trust Democrats more than Republicans to handle transgender issues 52% to 29% and that a majority of voters, including a majority of Independent voters, believe Republicans have a more extreme stance of transgender issues than Democrats.

A post-election poll by the Human Rights Campaign found that the anti-trans ads were largely ineffective as only 4% of voters said opposing transgender surgeries and transgender women's participation in sports motivated their vote, and voters ranked these issues last on a list of the most important issues to them. The poll showed that voter's discontent with the Biden administration, the economy and immigration were the main factors that led to Trump's victory.

Vox Media said that anti-trans ads have "no impact on whether people are likely to vote" and compared them to the "rising tide of fascism in the United States". Kelley Robinson, the president of the Human Rights Campaign, called the ads "desperate" and accused Republicans of focusing on "sowing fear and chaos" instead of talking about other issues like the economy. Jay Brown, chief of staff at the Human Rights Campaign said that the ads have had a negative impact on the mental health of trans people due to it being "in their faces all the time." LGBTQ Nation called the ads "wildly unpopular" among voters and said "there is a solid chance that the fate of transgender rights could mirror that of gay rights, becoming a sport of "political albatross" that instantly kills support for candidates. As politicians become more anti-trans, some members of their base oppose them more — likely due to people perceiving this issue as irrelevant and mean-spirited."

These ads led two Democratic politicians, Sherrod Brown and Colin Allred, to capitulate, ceding the issue at least partially to the Republican position. After Donald Trump won the 2024 election, two other Democrat politicians, Tom Suozzi and Seth Moulton, partially blamed their party's loss on their support for trans issues. Other Democrat politicians and human rights organizations disputed these claims, arguing polls showed that trans issues were not important to most voters and that voters were instead mobilized to vote for Trump due to other issues like inflation and the economy. Texas Democratic Party Chair, Gilberto Hinojosa also expressed anti-transgender sentiments following the 2024 election. Hinojosa subsequently apologized for his comments and resigned from his position after receiving backlash from other Democrats and LGBTQ advocacy groups. The Harris campaign's LGBTQ engagement director, Sam Alleman, urged voters not to blame trans people for Harris' loss in the election saying "Please do not blame trans issues or trans people for why we lost. ... No exit polling or data is showing this as a significant decision point for voters."

A widely cited post-election poll by the polling firm, Blueprint, showed that one of the top reasons swing voters pivoted to Donald Trump was the belief that "Kamala Harris is focused more on cultural issues like transgender issues rather than helping the middle class." This poll led many people, including Democratic representative, Seth Moulton, to blame transgender issues for Trump's victory and Democrats' loss of control of Congress. However, Blueprint's lead pollster, Evan Roth Smith, said in an interview that with the Rolling Stone that people were misunderstanding the poll, saying that other issues like the economy and immigration ranked as much bigger priorities to swing voters. Smith clarified that "I don't even see [the poll as indicating transgender issues were the reason Democrats lost]. I know there's some people who look at the Blueprint data and see that. Democrats lost this election on the economy and also some immigration stuff... it was almost incidental that the way the Republicans exploited [the Democrat's] failure was with the trans issue."

An NBC News exit poll for the 2024 election found that Kamala Harris garnered more support from LGBTQ voters than any other presidential candidate in history, with 86% of LGBTQ voters backing Harris and 12% backing Donald Trump - a margin 15% larger than Joe Biden's margin over Trump in 2020.

=== 2026 midterm elections ===
In March 2025, Trump indicated that attacking trans rights would be a large part of Republicans' main talking points in the 2026 midterm elections, saying that he had told Republicans, "Don't bring that subject up, because there's no election right now. But about a week before the election, bring it up, because you can't lose."

Democratic strategist Matt Angle suggested that in 2026, Democrats should adopt a strategy of showing voters that Republicans are exploiting transgender issues to cover up their failures on other issues like healthcare. Political scientist and pollster Mark Jones said it may be difficult for Republicans to attack trans rights in 2026 "because you're not going to have a Biden administration that included transgender as a protection under Title IX, or where the Department of Justice or the Department of Education are aggressively enforcing transgender rights across the country. You won't be able to have that foil to campaign against the same way that Republicans did in 2024 and 2022."

== Attacks on gay rights ==
Beginning in 2025, gay rights, specifically gay marriage, increasingly became under attack by Republican politicians and state legislatures. By February 2025, nine states had introduced legislation intended to chip away at gay marriage. Five of the measures introduced in Michigan, Idaho, Montana, North Dakota and South Dakota specifically urged the Supreme Court to overturn its 2015 ruling, Obergefell v. Hodges, which legalized gay marriage nationwide. The other four introduced in Missouri, Oklahoma, Tennessee and Texas would create a category for marriage called "covenant marriage" that would be only for one man and one woman.

In October 2025, the Texas Supreme Court issued a ruling allowing Texas judges to refuse to officiate same-sex weddings based on their "sincerely held religious beliefs."

In November 2025, the Supreme Court weighed whether to revisit the Obergefell ruling when they considered whether to hear an appeal to Ermold v. Davis brought by Kim Davis, a Kentucky court clerk who refused to issue marriage licenses to same-sex couples following Obergefell ruling in 2015. The appeal specifically asked the court to overturn Obergefell. The Supreme Court declined the appeal on November 10.

In early 2026, The Heritage Foundation, the right-wing group responsible for Project 2025, released a report opposing gay marriage.

== Media coverage ==
Scholars have argued that the media has contributed to increasing marginalization of LGBTQ+ people, especially in its coverage of trans people. Since 2015, anti-trans media coverage has increasingly focused on trans youth and trans athletes. Teen Vogue news and politics editor Lexi McMenamin said publications such as The New York Times, The Atlantic, the Washington Post, and The Guardian had published articles with an anti-trans bias. Holger B. Elischberger suggests that the U.S. should implement media policy reforms to protect trans people from disinformation.

=== New York Times transgender coverage ===
In 2022, The New York Times' reporting on transgender issues was criticized by the World Professional Association for Transgender Health, especially in regards to treatments for trans children. On February 15, 2023, two open letters were published, accusing the Times of publishing biased and misleading articles about trans people. These were signed by almost 1,200 past and current contributors, tens of thousands of readers and subscribers, and over 100 LGBTQ and civil rights groups—including GLAAD, the Human Rights Campaign and PFLAG.

The letters said the paper had published articles biased against transgender, non-binary, and gender nonconforming people, including "fringe theories", "dangerous inaccuracies", "pseudoscience" and "euphemistic, charged language". The letters also noted that the coverage was cited in an amicus brief in support of an anti-trans law in Alabama. In response to the letters, the Times said it was proud of its coverage, and issued an internal memo, saying: "We do not welcome, and will not tolerate, participation by Times journalists in protests organized by advocacy groups or attacks on colleagues on social media and other public forums."

== Responses ==
=== Domestic ===
==== Relocation ====
Some trans people and their families have fled to other U.S. states or countries, including the families of those who actively advocated against anti-trans laws in their states. Many families cite increasing social pressure and restrictions on gender-affirming care as reasons for moving.

A 2023 poll by Data for Progress found that 8 percent of transgender adults and 8 percent of LGBTQ 18-to-24-year-olds had moved out of their state as a result of anti-LGBTQ legislation. A 2025 report by The Trevor Project estimates 266,000 young people and their family members had moved to other states because of anti-LGBTQ policies.

Several states passed legislation preventing trans people and their families, as well as their healthcare providers relocating from other states, from being extradited. In 2022, Connecticut became the first state to implement such a law, alongside similar protections for reproductive healthcare providers and recipients. Massachusetts, California, Illinois, Minnesota, New Jersey, Maryland, and Washington, D.C. have passed similar laws.

Some trans Americans have considered claiming asylum in other countries, including European countries or Canada. However, some political analysts note that asylum applications will likely be denied, as no federal law exists restricting LGBTQ safety and because transgender individuals can likely move to a safer state in their own country. Others worry that potential asylum applications could overwhelm immigration systems and prevent asylum access for those from more dangerous territory.

==== Self-defense ====
The increased targeting of LGBTQ people by right-wing militia groups such as the Proud Boys and the Oath Keepers has led some LGBTQ people, particularly in conservative states such as Texas, to stockpile and train to use weapons and gear, including AR-15 rifles and modern body armor.

==== Travel warnings ====
In May 2023, the Human Rights Campaign issued a travel advisory for the state of Florida, citing new laws targeting the LGBTQ community.

=== International ===
After a ten-day tour in which he met with State officials in Alabama, Florida, and California in August 2022, Victor Madrigal-Borloz, a United Nations Independent Expert on protection against violence and discrimination, warned about the erosion of LGBTQ rights in the United States. Madrigal-Borloz stated: "I am deeply alarmed by a widespread, profoundly negative riptide created by deliberate actions to roll back the human rights of LGBT people at state level. The evidence shows that, without exception, these actions rely on prejudiced and stigmatising views of LGBT persons, in particular transgender children and youth, and seek to leverage their lives as props for political profit."

In August 2023, the Government of Canada issued a travel warning for LGBTQ visitors to the United States, advising citizens to check their destination's local laws before traveling.

== See also ==
- Anti-gender movement
- Anti-transgender movement in the United Kingdom
- Democratic backsliding in the United States
- Homophobia
- LGBTQ history in the United States
- LGBTQ rights in the United States
- LGBTQ rights opposition in the United States
- Parental rights movement
- Transphobia in the United States
- Transgender disenfranchisement in the United States
- Transgender genocide
- Transgender rights in the United States
- United States anti-abortion movement
- List of LGBTQ-related cases in the United States Supreme Court
- Human capital flight from the United States of America
