= Kansas Senate Bill 244 =

2026 law in Kansas, U.S.

Kansas Legislature
- Long title: Requiring the designation of multiple-occupancy private spaces in public buildings for use by only one sex and imposing criminal and civil penalties for violations, defining the term "gender" to mean biological sex at birth for purposes of statutory construction, directing the division of vehicles to invalidate and reissue driver's licenses when necessary to correct the gender identification on such licenses and directing the office of vital statistics to invalidate and reissue birth certificates when necessary to correct the sex identification on such certificates.
- Territorial extent: Kansas
- Enacted by: Kansas Senate
- Enacted: February 26, 2026
- Enacted by: Kansas House of Representatives
- Vetoed by: Governor Laura Kelly
- Vetoed: February 13, 2026
- Veto overridden: February 18, 2026

Legislative history

Initiating chamber: Kansas Senate
- Passed: January 28, 2026,
- Voting summary: 30 voted for; 9 voted against

Revising chamber: Kansas House of Representatives
- Bill title: H Sub for Senate Bill 244
- Passed: January 28, 2026,
- Voting summary: 87 voted for; 36 voted against

Final stages
- Reconsidered by the Kansas Senate after veto: February 17, 2026
- Voting summary: 31 voted for; 9 voted against
- Reconsidered by the Kansas House of Representatives after veto: February 18, 2026
- Voting summary: 87 voted for; 37 voted against
- Status: Current legislation

Kansas Senate Bill 244 is a bill that was passed by the Kansas Legislature on January 28, 2026.

Expanding upon SB 180 (2023), the bill prohibits gender self-identification on state-issued identity documents such as birth certificates and driver's licenses, and legally invalidates existing credentials whose gender markers do not reflect the holder's sex assigned at birth (as defined by state law) unless reissued in a compliant format.

The bill also makes it a misdemeanor for individuals to repeatedly utilize sex-segregated spaces in publicly owned facilities which do not match their sex assigned at birth, allowing fines as well as a private right of action to sue offenders.

== History ==
Senate Bill 180 was passed in April 2023 after the Kansas Legislature—which is controlled by a Republican supermajority—overrode a veto by Democratic governor Laura Kelly; the bill enshrines a definition of biological sex in state law, based on an individual's reproductive organs and ability to produce eggs. The bill ordered state agencies to recognize gender as an immutable male-female binary based on sex assigned at birth that cannot be changed. SB 180 also contained a bathroom bill intended to prohibit individuals from using single-sex spaces, such as bathrooms, locker rooms, crisis shelters, and any other area "where biology, safety or privacy are implicated that result in separate accommodations", that do not match their sex assigned at birth. Proponents of the bill argued that it was meant to protect women and their sex-based rights, while opponents of the bill considered it an attack on the rights of transgender and intersex individuals, and argued that it relied on outdated and inaccurate definitions.

SB 180 did not contain any enforcement mechanisms for its provisions, but Attorney General Kris Kobach interpreted it as prohibiting new or updated state-issued credentials (including driver's licenses and birth certificates) from containing gender markers that do not match the holder's sex assigned at birth. Kobach stated that existing credentials with gender markers reflecting gender identity would remain valid, but that the state's internal data would be changed to reflect sex assigned at birth, and newly issued credentials would reflect this data. After the bill took effect, Kobach obtained an injunction to prohibit the Kansas Department of Revenue (KDOR) from allowing gender self-identification changes on driver's licenses, citing a "public safety concern". In June 2025, the Kansas Court of Appeals struck down the injunction, citing that Kobach failed to demonstrate an irreparable harm caused by KDOR's issuance of driver's licenses that reflect their holder's gender identity. Kobach requested an appeal in the Kansas Supreme Court, but was denied in October 2025, after which KDOR resumed offering self-identification.

In January 2026, House Bill 2426 was introduced in committee by representative Susan Humphries, seeking to legally prohibit birth certificates and driver's licenses from displaying gender markers which do not match the holder's sex assigned at birth. Before the committee vote, it approved an amendment brought forward by representative Bob Lewis to impose stricter legal restrictions on the use of private sex-segregated spaces in publicly funded facilities.

After its passage by the House Judiciary Committee, a motion was passed to amend the unrelated Senate Bill 244 in a "gut and go" maneuver, changing its content to consist of the entirety of House Bill 2426. This allowed the bill to bypass Senate hearings, and prevented public debate of the new amendments. On January 28, 2026, Senate Bill 244 passed both the Senate and House along party lines with a two-thirds majority; House Democrat Dan Osman attempted to table amendments to the bill, but the motion was blocked. The House also passed a motion of "emergency final action" on the bill, allowing the bill to be voted on after its Senate approval without a delay.

The bill was subsequently vetoed by Governor Kelly on February 13, who argued that it was poorly-drafted and had "numerous and significant consequences". Kelly suggested that the Legislature "should stay out of the business of telling Kansans how to go to the bathroom and instead stay focused on how to make life more affordable for Kansans." The veto was overridden by the Senate and House on February 17 and 18. and the bill took effect February 26, 2026.

== Contents ==
The bill establishes a statutory interpretation that "gender" be defined as referring to biological sex as defined by SB 180. It prohibits state-issued identification cards, including driver's licenses and birth certificates, from containing gender markers that do not reflect the holder's sex assigned at birth as defined by SB 180. The bill requires that affected documents be considered invalid immediately upon implementation with no grace period, and that they be reissued with a corrected gender marker at the holder's expense.

The bill requires multiple-occupancy private spaces in publicly funded facilities (such as bathrooms and locker rooms) to be segregated based on biological sex, and legally prohibits individuals from using facilities which do not correspond with their sex assigned at birth as defined by SB 180. An individual would first receive a warning, after which they may be fined $1,000 for a second offense, and be charged with a misdemeanor for a third offense. The bill also contains a "bounty hunter" provision allowing a private right of action to sue an offender under this law for damages of "at least" $1,000.

== Reception ==
Kobach was the first to speak in favor of the bill, arguing that "in the midst of the trans issue and the controversies that surround it, sometimes people have taken to ["sex" and "gender"] as referring to different things, gender referring to a subjective mental assessment of what one is." Supporters of the bill also argued that it would ensure that law enforcement have access to accurate information for identification and de-escalation. Opponents of the bill cited driver's licenses as being an affirming "artifact of expression" for one's gender identity, and argued that the bill was part of growing anti-transgender sentiment in the United States. House Democrats criticized the lack of transparency regarding the bill, including the Republicans' efforts to expedite its passage through the Legislature with no public debate. Representative Abi Boatman, a transgender woman, derided the law as "culture war nonsense" and accused it of contributing to Kansas' human capital flight. On February 6, 2026, prior to the veto, 50 trans men and women staged a "pee-in" at the Kansas State Capitol in protest of the bill.

The mass invalidation of approximately 1,700 driver's licenses held by transgender residents of Kansas with no grace period was also criticized; the bill stipulated that the statute become law immediately upon its publication in the state register, rather than July 1, 2026, as per normal legislative procedure. Per the law, letters were sent to the affected individuals, which demanded that they surrender their current credentials to the Kansas DMV in order to receive a compliant version, and warning that they could face penalties and fines for driving under their existing licenses since they were legally considered invalid. American Civil Liberties Union (ACLU) attorney Harper Seldin criticized the bill for "put[ting] transgender people in danger any time they interact with law enforcement or apply for a job or for housing or public benefits", while claiming that it would increase the risk of anti-trans discrimination and violence. On February 26, 2026, the ACLU of Kansas filed a lawsuit in the Douglas County District Court requesting a restraining order against the bill, arguing that it violated the state constitution.

It was argued that the bill's mass invalidation of identification also led to disfranchisement due to the state's voter ID laws.

== Complications ==
There have been issues and confusion as a result of this law being passed. Kris Ripper, a transgender woman, had her ID, which read F for "female", invalidated. To continue being able to drive legally, Ripper got an ID with an M (for "male") gender marker on March 25th. The ID did not match her sense of self or visual appearance. On May 5, her car's automatic light system didn't turn on in a light summer rain, and she was pulled over. Upon seeing that she did not appear male, the officer asserted the ID was fake, and Ripper claims he interrogated her about the authenticity of the card for approximately 10 minutes. While the officer let her go with a warning, a criminal charge for "operating a motor vehicle without a valid license" with a punishment of up to 6 months in jail was filed, allegedly without her knowledge. Ripper did not receive any notice that a charge was filed and was threatened with further punishment for ignoring the charge. After the story was reported in various publications, the charges were dropped.

== See also ==
- Executive Order 14168
