= LGBTQ rights in Kansas =

- Kansas (US)
- Legal status: Legal since 2003 (Lawrence v. Texas)
- Gender identity: Transgender people no longer allowed to change legal gender since 2023
- Discrimination protections: Sexual orientation and gender identity protections in employment, housing and public accommodations since 2020

Family rights
- Recognition of relationships: Same-sex marriage since 2015
- Adoption: Same-sex couples allowed to adopt

Lesbian, gay, bisexual, transgender, and queer (LGBTQ) people in the U.S. state of Kansas have federal protections, but many face some legal challenges on the state level that are not experienced by non-LGBTQ residents. Same-sex sexual activity is legal in Kansas under the US Supreme Court case Lawrence v. Texas, although the state legislature has not repealed its sodomy laws that only apply to same-sex sexual acts. The state has prohibited discrimination on the basis of sexual orientation and gender identity in employment, housing, and public accommodations since 2020. Proposed bills restricting preferred gender identity on legal documents, bans on transgender people in women's sports, and bathroom use restrictions, among other bills, were vetoed numerous times by Democratic Governor Laura Kelly since 2021. However, many of Kelly's vetoes were overridden by the Republican supermajority in the Kansas legislature and became law. The latest in February 2026, was a US$1,000 bounty on transgender individuals who use a bathroom within Kansas.

Two lawsuits, one in state court and the other in federal court, challenged the constitutionality of the state's ban on same-sex marriage, and on November 4, 2014, a U.S. District Court judge ruled Kansas' ban on same-sex marriage unconstitutional. His ruling was stayed as the state sought a stay pending appeal without success, and it took effect on November 12, 2014. From November 12, 2014, to the Supreme Court's ruling in Obergefell v. Hodges on June 26, 2015, marriage licenses were generally available to same-sex couples, but the state government continued to deny recognition to same-sex marriages in all other respects.

== History and legality of same-sex sexual activity ==
Prior to European settlement of Kansas, there were no known social or legal punishments for engaging in homosexual activity. Among several Native American tribes, customs of "two-spirit" individuals existed: people who would dress, act and live as the opposite gender, as well as perform tasks associated with the opposite gender. Such individuals are known as míⁿxoge in the Kansa language, spoken by the Kaw people. The Native Americans did not share the typical Western views of gender and sexuality.

In 1855, sodomy ("crime against nature") was made a felony with a penalty of "not less than ten years". In 1859, this was changed to "not more than 10 years". In the 1925 case of State v. Hulbert, the Kansas Supreme Court held that fellatio, whether heterosexual or homosexual, violated the state's sodomy statute. A comprehensive reform of the law in 1969 resulted in a penalty of six months in jail and/or a fine of 1,000 dollars. The revision also legalized heterosexual sodomy; Kansas was one of the first U.S. states to do so. In 1976, a proposed bill to repeal the now-only homosexual sodomy law was approved by the Kansas House of Representatives by a vote of 21 to 19. However, it failed to be considered in the Senate.

In 1989, in State v. Moppin, the state Supreme Court held that cunnilingus did not violate the state sodomy statute. The Kansas Legislature acted quickly, passing a law the following year forbidding the "oral-genital stimulation between the tongue of a male and the genital area of a female." This law excluded lesbian relations but reintroduced criminal penalties for certain heterosexual conduct. In 1992, the law was amended to include lesbian relations as well.

Sterilization against "habitual criminals", including those convicted under the sodomy law, has a long history in the state of Kansas. In 1913, the Kansas Legislature passed a law allowing the sterilization of state inmates. This law was unanimously upheld by the state Supreme Court in 1928. By the end of 1934, 1,362 people had been sterilized under the law; 19% via the procedures of castration or oophorectomy, which the state defended as "limit[ing] lewdness and vice". Through 1948, the number of sterilizations had reached about 3,000, the third-highest in the entire United States, a majority on the ground of "insanity and mental retardation". The law was finally repealed in 1965.

The U.S. Supreme Court's 2003 decision in Lawrence v. Texas rendered laws banning consensual sexual activity unenforceable, including that of Kansas. State v. Limon, the first case decided under the Lawrence precedent, invalidated a provision of the state's Romeo and Juliet law that assigned harsher sentences in statutory rape cases where the parties were of the same sex.

== Recognition of same-sex relationships ==
=== Marriage ===
Same-sex marriage became legal in Kansas following the U.S. Supreme Court decision in Obergefell v. Hodges on June 26, 2015, which found the denial of marriage rights to same-sex couples unconstitutional. By June 29, the next business day after the decision, 25 of the state's 32 judicial districts were issuing licenses to same-sex couples, and some of those that were not had yet to receive an application from a same-sex couple. By June 30, all judicial districts were either issuing same-sex marriage licenses or had announced their intention to do so. Kansas for the previous decade had recognized neither same-sex marriages nor any other form of legal recognition of same-sex unions. The state explicitly banned same-sex marriage and all other types of same-sex unions both by statute and by constitutional amendment.

The state's definitions and restrictions had been challenged in several lawsuits. On October 7, 2014, officials in Johnson County began accepting licenses for marriage applications, due to the Supreme Court's recent refusal to hear a Utah case now binding on Kansas. The state Attorney General filed a lawsuit in order to stop those actions. One couple obtained a marriage license and married on October 10, on the steps of the Johnson County courthouse. On October 10, 2014, the Kansas Supreme Court ordered officials in Johnson County to stop issuing marriage licenses to same-sex couples, though it allowed for court clerks to accept applications for marriage licenses from same-sex couples. It scheduled a hearing for November 6.

On November 18, 2014, the Kansas Supreme Court ruled that Johnson County had been within its jurisdiction to issue marriage licenses to same-sex couples based on its interpretation of the law. It lifted the stay on Johnson County from issuing the licenses, but did not direct other counties to issue them.

Judge Daniel D. Crabtree heard oral arguments on October 31, 2014, in another lawsuit in U.S. district court, Marie v. Moser. He found the state's ban on same-sex marriage unconstitutional on November 4, but stayed enforcement of his ruling for a week. The state sought a stay pending appeal without success from the Tenth Circuit Court of Appeals, and Crabtree's order preventing the state from enforcing its ban on same-sex marriage took effect on November 12 when the U.S. Supreme Court declined his request for a stay pending appeal.

=== Domestic partnership ===
The cities of Lawrence and Topeka have established domestic partnership registries.

== Adoption and parenting ==
In November 2012, the Kansas Court of Appeals ruled in the case of In the Matter of the Adoption of I. M. that a single person who is not a biological parent of a child cannot petition to adopt that child without terminating the other parent's parental rights. However, the Kansas Supreme Court ruled on February 22, 2013, in Frazier v. Goudschaal, that the partner of a biological parent may receive parental rights according to the best interest of the children in some circumstances, such as where there is no second parent and thus no termination of parental rights is involved, and the partner has assumed a parenting role of the children.

Since the legalization of same-sex marriage, married same-sex couples have been allowed to adopt. Lesbian couples can access in vitro fertilization, and state law recognizes the non-genetic, non-gestational mother as a legal parent to a child born via donor insemination, but only if the parents are married. In addition, Kansas permits and recognizes both gestational and traditional surrogacy contracts, though the latter may result in more legal complications than the former. The state treats same-sex and different-sex couples equally under the same terms and conditions.

Kansas law allows adoption agencies to choose not to place children in certain homes if it would violate the agency's religious or moral convictions.

== Discrimination protections ==
Map of Kansas counties and cities that had sexual orientation and/or gender identity anti–employment discrimination ordinances prior to Bostock Sexual orientation and gender identity with anti–employment discrimination ordinance Sexual orientation and gender identity solely in public employment Sexual orientation in public employment No anti-discrimination ordinance¹ ¹Since 2020 as a result of Bostock, discrimination on account of sexual orientation or gender identity in public and private employment is outlawed throughout the state. Discrimination against state employees based on their sexual orientation or gender identity has been illegal since 2019, and previously between 2007 and 2015.

Between 2007 and 2015, Kansas prohibited discrimination on the basis of sexual orientation or gender identity in government employment due to an executive order issued by Governor Kathleen Sebelius in August 2007. Governor Sam Brownback rescinded that order on February 10, 2015. In January 2019, Governor Laura Kelly, shortly after taking office, signed an executive order to protect state government employees and contractors from discrimination based on their sexual orientation or gender identity.

The cities of Fairway, Kansas City, Lawrence, Leawood, Lenexa, Manhattan, Merriam, Mission, Mission Hills, Mission Woods, Olathe, Overland Park, Prairie Village, Roeland Park, Shawnee, Westwood, Westwood Hills, Wichita, and Wyandotte County, prohibit discrimination on the basis of sexual orientation or gender identity in public and private employment, housing and public accommodations.

Other cities, including the capital city of Topeka, Emporia and Hutchinson, prohibit discrimination against city employees on account of their sexual orientation and gender identity. Likewise, the county of Shawnee, prohibits discrimination against county employees, but on the basis of sexual orientation only.

On November 6, 2012, the voters of the cities of Salina and Hutchinson both voted to repeal city anti-discrimination ordinances on the basis of sexual orientation and gender identity.

In January 2014, Kansas House Bill 2453 was introduced which would have allowed people motivated by religious opposition to same-sex relationships to refuse to provide services to same-sex couples. On February 12, the Kansas House of Representatives passed the legislation by a 72–49 vote. The Kansas Senate did not take up the legislation. It was part of a broader movement to anticipate resistance to the recognition of same-sex marriages.

Since 2016, Kansas law has prohibited public universities from "[denying] a religious student association any benefit available to any other student association based on those organizations' sincerely held religious beliefs".

On October 12, 2021, the Wichita City Council voted to adopt a non-discrimination ordinance prohibiting discrimination in housing, employment and public accommodations on the basis of gender identity or sexual orientation. The ordinance went into effect on October 29, 2021, and complaints were accepted beginning January 1, 2022.

=== Bostock v. Clayton County ===
On June 15, 2020, the U.S. Supreme Court ruled in Bostock v. Clayton County, consolidated with Altitude Express, Inc. v. Zarda, and R.G. & G.R. Harris Funeral Homes Inc. v. Equal Employment Opportunity Commission that discrimination in the workplace on the basis of sexual orientation or gender identity is discrimination on the basis of sex, and Title VII therefore protects LGBT employees from discrimination.

In August 2020, the Kansas Human Rights Commission announced in light of Bostock that it will also investigate and resolve cases alleging discrimination in housing and public accommodations, such as retail stores and educational institutions. Any business with four or more employees will be covered; whereas the Supreme Court ruling only affects businesses with at least 15 employees.

== Hate crime law ==
At present, Kansas' hate crime law provides penalty enhancements for the commission of a crime motivated by the victim's sexual orientation. It does not cover gender identity. However, federal law has covered both categories since the Matthew Shepard and James Byrd Jr. Hate Crimes Prevention Act was signed into law by President Barack Obama in October 2009.

== Regulation of LGBT material ==
In March 2024, the Kansas State Legislature passed a bill redefining content containing "acts of homosexuality" as being harmful to minors, in the same category as most forms of pornography. The law went on to require government ID-based age verification to access such material.

== Conversion therapy ==
In June 2020, Roeland Park became the first city in the state to ban conversion therapy on minors. Lawrence followed suit in April 2021.

In October 2021, Prairie Village became the third city within Kansas to legally ban conversion therapy.

== Transgender rights ==
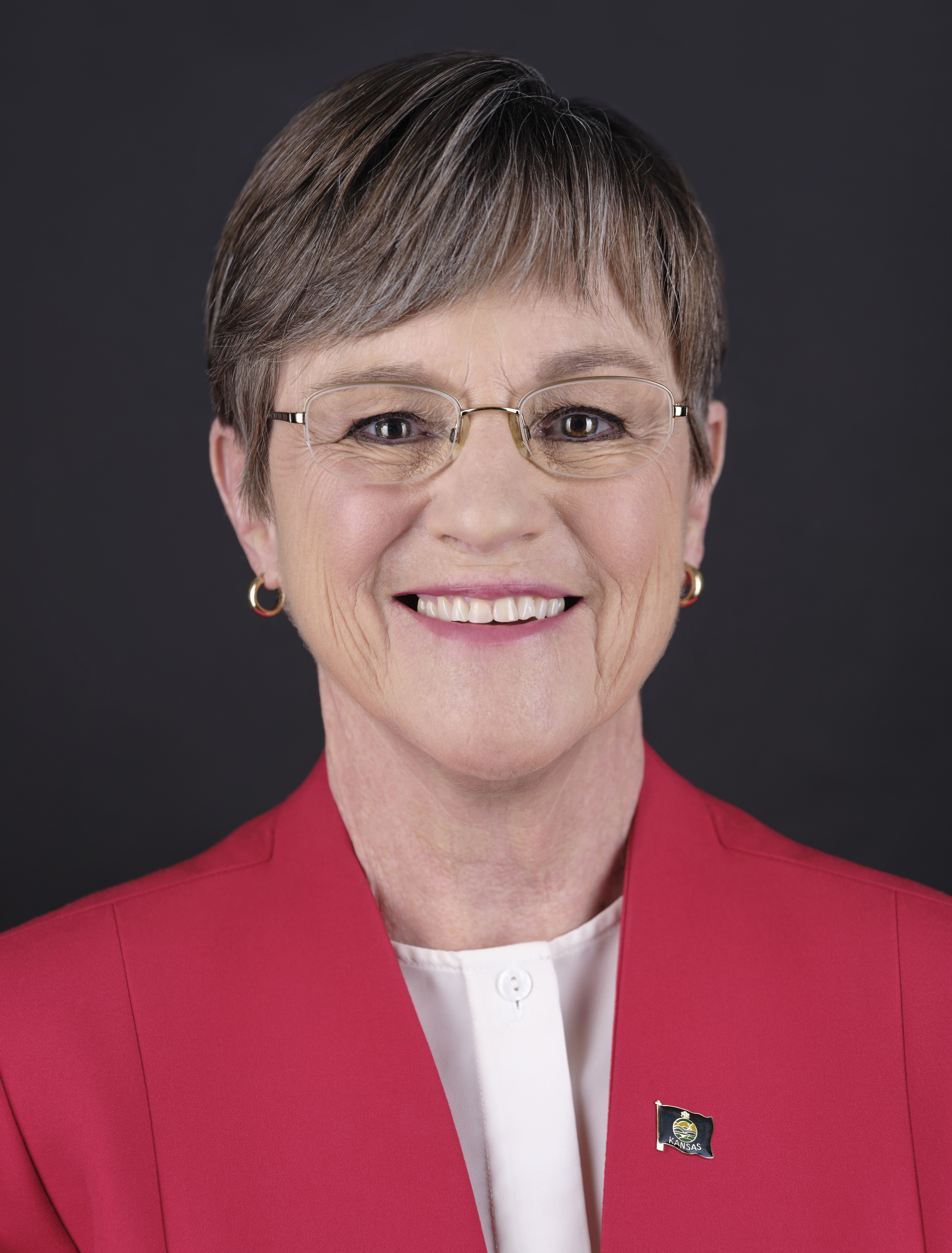
In an attempt to curb anti-LGBT legislation, such as SB 180, Kansas Governor Laura Kelly used veto power to prevent such bills from becoming law. However, many of Kelly's vetoes have been overridden by the Kansas legislature since 2021.

In 2022, a middle school math teacher in Geary County, Kansas sued the superintendent, complaining that the school requires her to use each student's preferred name. A federal judge granted part of a preliminary injunction in favor of the teacher while her case proceeded, allowing her to out the students to their parents.

=== Documents ===
In October 2018, Lambda Legal filed a suit in court arguing that the policy of denying transgender people an updated birth certificate reflecting their gender identity is unconstitutional. The move followed judicial decisions striking down similar bans in Idaho and Puerto Rico earlier that year.

In June 2019, Kansas became the 48th U.S. state to allow transgender individuals to change their gender on official documents. The Office of Vital Statistics would issue an updated birth certificate upon receipt of an affidavit signed by the applicant requesting a change in sex designation, a completed "Application to Amend a Kansas Birth Certificate" form, and one of the following: an already updated driver's license, an already updated passport, or certification from a healthcare professional or mental health professional confirming "based on his or her professional opinion the true gender identity of the applicant and that it is expected that this will continue to be the gender with which the applicant will identify in the future". The Department of Revenue would issue an updated driver's license or state ID after the submission of either a court order, an already updated birth certificate, or medical attestation including a letter signed by the applicant requesting the change and a letter from a licensed physician stating that the "applicant has undergone appropriate clinical treatment or that the physician has re-evaluated the applicant and determined that gender reclassification based on physical criteria is appropriate". When Kansas began allowing this, only two states remained that did not: Ohio and Tennessee.

In April 2023, the Kansas Legislature passed SB 180 (also referred to as the Women's Bill of Rights) via veto override, which enshrines a definition of biological sex in state law, and prohibits state agencies from recognizing any genders beyond the male or female sex assigned at birth. To comply with the law, Attorney General Kris Kobach stated that state data, as well as new or updated credentials such as driver's licenses and birth certificates, would only reflect "the original sex at birth", but that individuals would not be required to surrender documentation that do not reflect this requirement.

After the bill took effect on July 1, Governor Kelly announced that the Kansas Department of Revenue (KDOR) would continue serving requests for citizens to change their gender identity. Kobach sued two officials in Kelly's administration over her denouncement of the law, and a temporary two-week restraining order was granted by judge Teresa Watson prohibiting gender identity changes to driver's licenses, citing a "public safety concern." In August 2023, Lawrence, Kansas passed its "Safe Haven" ordinance to protect trans city employees and residents from the potential effects of SB 180.

On June 13, 2025, a unanimous ruling by the Kansas Court of Appeals reversed the injunction and sent it back to the Shawnee District Court for reassessment, ruling that Kobach failed to establish that there was sufficient evidence of irreparable harm caused by the KDOR's long-standing policy, and that Judge Watson "committed an error of fact by concluding that there was evidence — any evidence beyond mere speculation — to support a finding that law enforcement would be immediately hindered in the identification of suspects, victims, wanted persons, missing persons, detainees, and others if the driver's license did not display the driver's sex assigned at birth." In October 2025, the Kansas Supreme Court rejected Kobach's request for an appeal, thus allowing the Department of Revenue to continue allowing changes to gender markers.

In February 2026, the state passed SB 244 via veto override. Among its provisions, the bill legally requires state-issued identification documents (including driver's licenses) to reflect the holder's sex assigned at birth, and requires the invalidation and reissue of any state identification documents containing gender markers that do not reflect the holder's sex assigned at birth, at the holder's expense. The bill does not contain a grace period and took effect immediately on February 26, 2026; affected driver's license holders received letters from the state instructing them to surrender their licenses, and warning that "you may be subject to additional penalties if you are operating a vehicle without a valid credential". The ACLU of Kansas filed a lawsuit seeking to block the bill.

=== Sports ===
In both April 2021 and April 2022, the Kansas Legislature passed bills (twice over) that ban transgender athletes from participating in any female sports team, but Governor Laura Kelly vetoed both bills.

As of February 2023, the Kansas State High School Activities Association stated that schools may decide on a case-by-case basis the appropriate athletic gender team for a transgender student.

On February 22, 2023, the Kansas House voted 82–40 to ban transgender girls from girls' sports, while the Kansas Senate voted 26–11 to ban doctors from providing gender-affirming care to minors and voted 26–10 to bar transgender people of any age from gendered public accommodations like bathrooms, requiring them to use the space associated with their gender assigned at birth. These were not veto-proof majorities: the House bill was two votes short, and the two Senate bills were each one vote short. In March 2023, Governor Kelly vetoed the bill for the third time. However, the veto was overridden by the legislature, and the bill went into effect on July 1.

=== Health care ===
On April 12, 2024, Governor Kelly vetoed SB 233, a bill that would have banned gender-affirming care for minors under the age of 18. The Republican-led legislature attempted to override the veto, but failed to reach two-thirds majority by two votes.

In February 2025, Kelly vetoed the similar SB 63; this time, the veto was overridden by the legislature on February 18, 2025. In May 2026, State District Judge Carl Folsom III granted a temporary injunction blocking enforcement of the bill, as part of an ACLU-backed lawsuit by the parents of two teenagers undergoing gender-affirming care.

=== Bathroom bans ===
SB 180 directed that individuals be prohibited from entering sex segregated spaces that do not match their sex assigned at birth, such as bathrooms, crisis shelters, prisons, and any other area "where biology, safety or privacy are implicated that result in separate accommodation". While described as one of the strictest bathroom bills in the United States due to its broad wording, the bill did not establish any enforcement mechanisms

SB 244 adds a provision mandating financial and criminal penalties of up to $1,000 for individuals who use a gender-segregated facility in a publicly-owned building which does not match their sex assigned at birth. The bill also contains a "bounty hunter" provision allowing private citizens to sue for damages of up to $1,000.

== Public opinion ==
Recent opinion polls have shown that support for LGBTQ people across the U.S. state of Kansas is increasing significantly and opposition is decreasing.

A 2017 Public Religion Research Institute (PRRI) opinion poll found that 57% of Kansas residents supported same-sex marriage, while 37% opposed it and 6% were unsure. Additionally, 67% supported an anti-discrimination law covering sexual orientation and gender identity. 26% were opposed.

A 2022 Public Religion Research Institute (PRRI) opinion poll found that 69% of Kansas residents supported same-sex marriage, while 30% opposed it and 1% were unsure. Additionally, 77% supported an anti-discrimination law covering sexual orientation and gender identity. 23% were opposed.

Public opinion for LGBTQ anti-discrimination laws in Kansas
Poll source	Date(s) administered	Sample size	Margin of error	% support	% opposition	% no opinion
Public Religion Research Institute	January 2-December 30, 2019	492	?	72%	24%	4%
Public Religion Research Institute	January 3-December 30, 2018	547	?	70%	26%	4%
Public Religion Research Institute	April 5-December 23, 2017	686	?	67%	26%	7%
Public Religion Research Institute	April 29, 2015-January 7, 2016	876	?	68%	26%	6%

== Summary table ==
Same-sex sexual activity legal	Yes (De facto legal since 2003. The state has anti-sodomy law still on books, but unenforceable)
Equal age of consent (16)	Yes (Since 2005, Romeo and Juliet's unequal laws still on books)
Anti-discrimination laws in employment	Yes (Since 2020; only as a result of the Kansas Human Relations Commission's adoption of EEOC guidance following the US Supreme Court decision in Bostock v. Clayton County. Kansas civil rights laws do not explicitly ban discrimination based on sexual orientation or gender identity/expression. However, a patchwork of protections cover roughly 50% of the state's total population under municipal nondiscrimination ordinances.)
Anti-discrimination laws in housing	Yes (Since 2020; only as a result of the Kansas Human Relations Commission's adoption of EEOC guidance following the US Supreme Court decision in Bostock v. Clayton County. Kansas civil rights laws do not explicitly ban discrimination based on sexual orientation or gender identity/expression. However, a patchwork of protections cover roughly 50% of the state's total population under municipal nondiscrimination ordinances.)
Anti-discrimination laws in public accommodations	Yes (Since 2020; only as a result of the Kansas Human Relations Commission's adoption of EEOC guidance following the US Supreme Court decision in Bostock v. Clayton County. Kansas civil rights laws do not explicitly ban discrimination based on sexual orientation or gender identity/expression. However, a patchwork of protections cover roughly 50% of the state's total population under municipal nondiscrimination ordinances.)
Same-sex marriages	Yes (Since 2015; only as a result of the US Supreme Court's 2015 Obergefell decision in which same-sex couples gained the freedom to marry nationwide, and states are required to provide them the same rights and benefits of marriage as different-sex couples. As a result, all married same-sex couples are entitled to the following benefits on an equal basis: marriage, medical decision-making authority, step-parent, and joint adoption for married couples. Although currently unenforceable due to Obergefell, the state's constitutional and statutory bans on same-sex marriages remain on the books.)
Joint and stepchild adoption by same-sex couples	Yes (Since 2015; only as a result of the US Supreme Court's 2015 Obergefell decision in which same-sex couples gained the freedom to marry nationwide, and states are required to provide them the same rights and benefits of marriage as different-sex couples. As a result, all married same-sex couples are entitled to the following benefits on an equal basis: marriage, medical decision-making authority, step-parent, and joint adoption for married couples. Although currently unenforceable due to Obergefell, the state's constitutional and statutory bans on same-sex marriages remain on the books.)
Lesbian, gay and bisexual people allowed to serve openly in the military	Yes (Since 2011)
Gender-affirming healthcare protections	(Banned since 2025, under a veto override)
Transgender people allowed to serve openly in the military	(Since 2025, under a signed executive order)
Intersex people allowed to serve openly in the military	(Current DoD policy bans "hermaphrodites" from serving or enlisting in the military)
Third gender option	No
Conversion therapy banned on minors	No / Yes (In some cities and counties)
Gay panic defense abolished	No
Right to change legal gender on official state identity documents	No (Since July 1, 2023 - sex changes on birth certificates and driving licences are explicitly banned)
MSMs allowed to donate blood	Yes (Since 2023, under FDA regulations on the condition of being monogamous)
