= Gut and go =

"Gut and go," also known as "gut and amend" or "gut and stuff," is a term used to describe a tactic used in United States state legislatures to pass bills quickly without public notice or hearings.

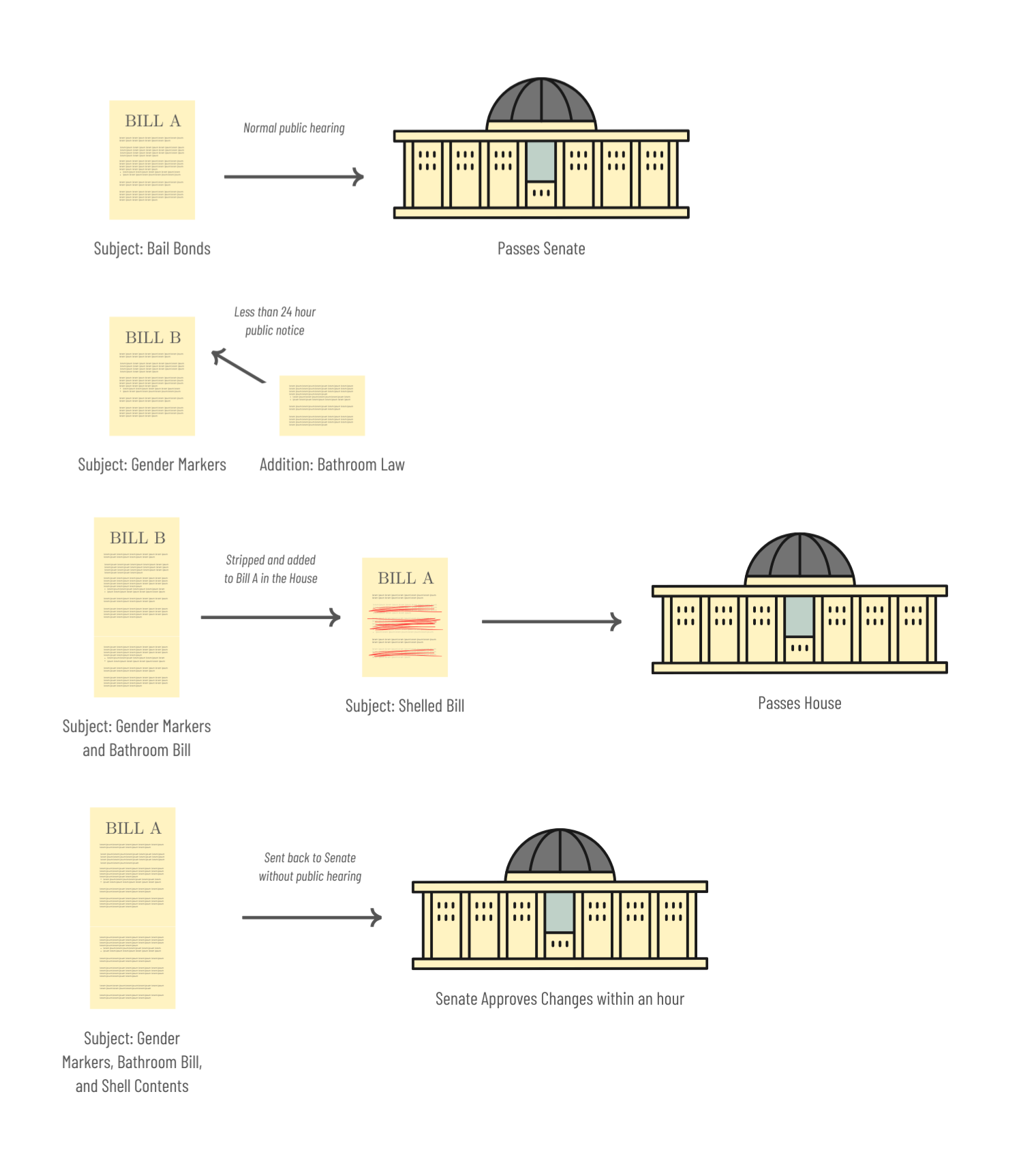
"Gut and Go" procedures allow some state legislatures to add controversial legislation to partially passed bills in order to circumvent public hearings.

== Background ==
The procedure is legal in multiple states. In Oregon, bills are required to be single-subject only. Consequently, "gut and go" placeholder bills must remain broad or in the same subject as the future amended bill.

"Gut and go" was used to pass the Election Rigging Response Act in California as a part of the nationwide 2025–2026 United States redistricting movement.

=== Procedure ===
Under "gut and go," a bill would pass one chamber. Then, in the other chamber, representatives strip it of its contents and merge another bill into it. The second chamber passes the first bill, which now has the contents of the second bill. Because the first chamber already passed the bill, it only needs to approve of the changes, not have another public hearing or hold committee hearings to debate the changes. This part of the process typically happens within 24 hours, preventing public feedback.

== Support and opposition ==
Supporters say that it saves time and is a legislative tool. The procedure can bypass deadlines for introducing new bills.

Critics of "gut and go" say it is designed to minimize transparency and fast track legislation. The Gay, Lesbian, and Straight Education Network and the ACLU oppose "gut and go," particularly in passing anti-trans legislation.
