= Kansas Senate Bill 63 =

2025 Kansas law

Help Not Harm Act

Kansas Legislature
- Long title: AN ACT concerning children and minors; relating to healthcare of minors; enacting the help not harm act; prohibiting healthcare providers from treating a child whose gender identity is inconsistent with the child's sex; authorizing a civil cause of action against healthcare providers for providing such treatments; restricting use of state funds to promote gender transitioning; prohibiting professional liability insurance from covering damages for healthcare providers that provide gender transition treatment to children; requiring professional discipline against a healthcare provider who performs such treatments; adding violation of the act to the definition of unprofessional conduct for physicians; amending K.S.A. 65-2837 and repealing the existing section.
- Territorial extent: Kansas
- Enacted by: Kansas Senate
- Enacted: January 29, 2025
- Passed by: Kansas House of Representatives
- Passed: January 31, 2025
- Vetoed by: Laura Kelly
- Vetoed: February 11, 2025
- Veto overridden: February 18, 2025
- Effective: July 1, 2025

Legislative history

First chamber: Kansas Senate
- Introduced: January 22, 2025
- Voting summary: 32 voted for; 8 voted against
- Passed: January 29, 2025

Second chamber: Kansas House of Representatives
- Voting summary: 83 voted for; 35 voted against
- Passed: January 31, 2025

Final stages
- Reconsidered by the Kansas Senate after veto: February 18, 2025
- Voting summary: 31 voted for; 9 voted against
- Reconsidered by the Kansas House of Representatives after veto: February 18, 2025
- Voting summary: 85 voted for; 34 voted against

Summary
- Restricts gender-affirming medical care for Kansans under eighteen years of age.
- Status: Not yet in force

Kansas Senate Bill 63 (S.B. 63), also known as the Help Not Harm Act, is a 2025 law in the state of Kansas that bans gender-affirming care for transgender people under 18, allows disciplinary actions against medical providers who do give such care and requires transgender Kansans under 18 to medically detransition by December 31, 2025.

The bill passed in January and was subsequently vetoed by Democratic governor Laura Kelly. Her veto was overridden on February 18, 2025, and became law on February 20. A lawsuit is pending by the ACLU of Kansas.

== Provisions ==
S.B. 63 bans gender-affirming care for minors in Kansas. It allows those who have received or would receive said care to sue healthcare professionals for providing such care. It blocks the state from using taxpayer money to pay for gender-affirming care. Minors already receiving gender-affirming care are required to withdraw from said care by December 31, 2025, generally affecting hormone replacement therapy (HRT). It also restricts state employees, like social workers, from acknowledging or supporting the transition of a minor, medical or not. The law fully took effect on July 1, 2025.

== Reactions ==
=== Support ===
The Alliance Defending Freedom opposed governor Laura Kelly's February 11 veto, stating that S.B. 63 it protected kids from "gender ideology" and that gender-affirming medical treatments harmed children. State Republicans nearly unanimously supported S.B. 63. A statement was released by Republican Senate President Ty Masterson and Republican House Speaker Dan Hawkins in opposition to Kelly's veto. Attorney General Kris Kobach endorsed S.B. 63 and promised to fight the ACLU's lawsuit against it. The Christian Post released an article following Kelly's veto favoring pro-S.B. 63 stances.

=== Opposition ===
S.B. 63 was opposed by the ACLU of Kansas and the national ACLU. Some local providers and medical groups, such as Interpersonal Psychiatry and Kansas Interfaith Action, released statements in opposition to S.B. 63.

==== Laura Kelly ====
Laura Kelly, the governor of Kansas, vetoed S.B. 63 on February 11, 2025. In her response, she explained that the bill did not help Kansans with their present issues and that the bill infringed on the rights of parents to decide what is right for their children.
