= Gender marker =

Field on personal identification

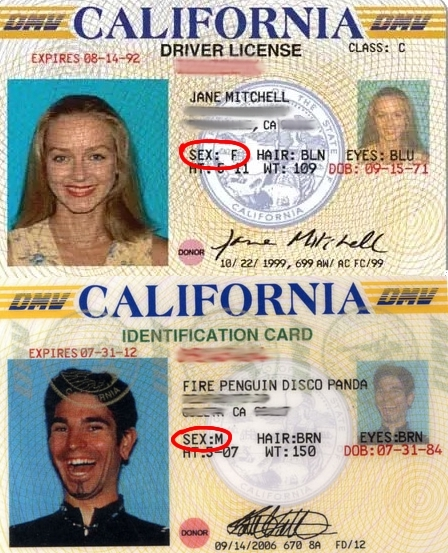
Female (F) and male (M) California driver's licenses. Gender markers are circled in red.

A gender marker is the field on a passport or other personal documentation that displays the holder's gender identity. The marker on most IDs issued will match the person's assigned gender at birth (AGAB). Some countries will issue non-AGAB gender markers to intersex, transgender, or non-binary individuals.

== Common values ==
The most common gender markers found internationally on identifying documents are "M" and "F" (for male and female). Some countries allow a citizen to choose "X" as their gender marker, or to change their gender marker from M to F for male-to-female (MtF) individuals, or F to M for female-to-male (FtM) individuals. The X marker is commonly used for individuals whose gender or sex fall outside the typical binaries, such as non-binary or intersex individuals. The use of the X marker instead of F or M in machine-readable passports is standardized by the International Civil Aviation Organization, along with the character "<" in the machine-readable zone (MRZ) of the document.

Some countries have used or currently use a different term on their census data or other identification methods for non-binary or intersex citizens. For instance, India and Bangladesh have both previously used the marker "E" (short for "eunuch") on passports or voter registration to denote trans individuals, with India allowing it on passports from 2005 and voter registration from 2009. Multiple South and East Asian countries use terms such as "hijra" to denote a third gender or trans individuals, and this is occasionally reflected on official documentation.

== Recognition of non-binary gender markers ==
Of the M, F, and X gender markers, X is the least commonly seen due to lack of recognition globally. As of early 2026, 16 countries have fully recognized both the use of X or some other "third gender" option for intersex individuals as well as those who wish to adopt it. This does not include Botswana, which passed a law to that effect in 2017 but has not allowed anyone to actually do so. Four more countries recognize X only for intersex individuals and a further four countries have varying recognition depending on region/state.

=== Countries that fully recognize a non-binary gender marker for all individuals ===
- Bangladesh – since 2014, "other" or "Hijra"
- India – since 2005
- Nepal – since 2007
- Pakistan – "third gender" category since 2009, X marker since 2017
- Denmark – since 2014
- Germany – "diverse"("divers") for intersex only from 2018, anyone since 2024
- Iceland – since 2019 for children 15 and up, under 15 requires a parent's approval
- Malta – gradual legalization since 2004, X marker since 2017
- Netherlands – since 2018
- Canada – since 2019 (available on the provincial level since 2017)
- Costa Rica – X marker or "N/I" since 2022
- Australia – X marker since 2011 for intersex; state-by-state legal recognition completed in 2025 with New South Wales.
- New Zealand – since 2012
- Argentina – since 2021
- Chile – since 2022
- Colombia – most documentation since 2022, passport since 2023

=== Countries that allow non-binary gender markers for intersex individuals only ===
- Austria – "divers", "inter", "open", or X markers available after expert's diagnosis. Switching between F and M available only with expert's opinion and attempts to visually transition
- Kenya – ambiguous laws regarding self-determination. An Eldoret High Court ruling in 2025 reaffirmed a citizen's right to determine their "self-identified gender." There remains no proper route for changing gender marker; however intersex individuals could chose to put "I" on their documentation for the Kenyan 2024 census.
- Mauritius – per a 2021 amendment to the Mauritius Civil Status Act: "Where the sex of a newborn cannot be determined due to congenital anomalies at the time of birth or stillbirth, the officer shall register the sex as 'undetermined'"
- Morocco – since 2021, individuals with ambiguous sex at birth are identified at birth as "الخنثى" (al-khunthā; 'intersex'; lit. "hermaphrodite")

=== Countries with regional (but not national) recognition of non-binary gender markers ===
US states by "X" gender marker availability Self-determination or court order allowed Required via federal court order Policy unclear No "X" marker allowed No gender marker change allowed

- United States – The US has varying legality across all 50 states for recognition of the non-binary gender marker (typically X). These laws also vary, sometimes within the same state, depending on what document the individual wishes to update (passport, driver's license, birth certificate, etc.). Additionally, although passports with the X marker have been available since 2022, recent pressure by the second Trump administration has led US Customs and Border Protection and other government agencies to not recognize the marker for travelers.
- Mexico – legality varies by state, with 20 out of 31 Mexican states and Mexico City allowing trans people to correct their name and gender marker on official documentation.
- Spain – national protection of documentation change without supporting evidence since 2022; however this does not include intersex or non-binary individuals. The Spanish provinces of Navarre and La Rioja have included these groups since 2017, and Catalonia has included them since 2022.
- Brazil – national protection of documentation change without supporting evidence since 2018. However, a high court case verdict in 2025 upheld an individual's right to choose a non-binary gender on their official documentation.

=== Countries without a third gender marker option, but allowing self-determination (M or F) ===
- Botswana – since 2017
- Ireland – since 2015
- Uruguay – since 2018, the federal government also recognizes non-binary gender identities but does not provide pathways for reflecting them on official documentation.

== See also ==
- Legal recognition of non-binary gender
- Legal status of transgender people
- Intersex
- Gender self-identification
