= Kansas Senate Bill 180 =

2023 law in Kansas, U.S.

Kansas Legislature
- Territorial extent: Kansas
- Enacted by: Kansas Senate
- Enacted by: Kansas House of Representatives
- Vetoed by: Governor Laura Kelly
- Vetoed: 20 April 2023
- Veto overridden: 27 April 2023

Legislative history

Initiating chamber: Kansas Senate
- Passed: February 9, 2023
- Voting summary: 28 voted for; 12 voted against

Revising chamber: Kansas House of Representatives
- Passed: February 23, 2023
- Voting summary: 83 voted for; 41 voted against

Final stages
- Reconsidered by the Kansas Senate after veto: April 26, 2023
- Voting summary: 28 voted for; 12 voted against
- Reconsidered by the Kansas House of Representatives after veto: April 27, 2023
- Voting summary: 84 voted for; 40 voted against; 1 absent
- Status: Current legislation

Kansas SB 180 or the Kansas Women's Bill of Rights is a bill that that defines sex to refer outside of transgender and intersex individuals in law. The bill defines intersex conditions such as Complete androgen insensitivity syndrome as being male, and defines sex by gonadal tissue. Kansas governor Laura Kelly vetoed the bill in April 2023. On April 26th and 27th, the Kansas Senate and House of Representatives voted to override the veto, making the bill law.

== Bill ==
The bill was originally introduced in the Kansas Senate by Republican Renee Erickson in February 2023, and is sponsored by the Committee on Public Health and Welfare. It received final passage with amendments on April 4, 2023. It defines a "female" as a person "whose biological reproductive system is developed to produce ova", and a "male" as a person "whose biological reproductive system is developed to fertilize the ova of a female". Its proponents state that biological sex should be defined in law excluding trans people. The bill is controversial for excluding intersex people, such as those with ambiguous genitalia, with both male or female reproductive organs, or women born without ovaries.

Despite the fact that the federal government recognizes gender transition on documents including passports and birth certificates and in housing, the bill restricts agencies in Kansas, both public and private, from assigning any gender other than that assigned at birth. It has been criticized as removing human rights and legal rights from trans people in the state.

== Testimony ==
During the hearing of Kansas SB 180, proponents' testimony stated a need to legally define biological sex specifically for purposes of sex segregation, and also stated that the bill is consistent with federal protections for transgender people. Opposition testimony stated that the bill employs outdated, inaccurate, and underinclusive definitions of sex and families, as well as excluding intersex people.

== Veto ==
On April 20, 2023, Governor Kelly vetoed the bill, stating that it threatens economic development in Kansas and would leave the state open to lawsuits alleging discrimination. The Speaker of the Kansas House of Representatives, Dan Hawkins, criticized the governor's veto as taking the side of "left-wing activists". According to the Kansas Coalition Against Sexual and Domestic Violence, if it became law and was inconsistent with federal law, the bill could endanger over $17 million in federal funding to the state.

=== Veto overridden ===
On April 26, 2023, the Kansas Senate voted to override the veto, with the Kansas House of Representatives also voting to override the veto on April 27, 2023. This actions made the bill a law.

== See also ==
- Bathroom bill
- LGBT rights in Kansas
- Public Facilities Privacy & Security Act (HB2)
- Kansas Senate Bill 244
