= Trans-exclusionary radical feminism by country =

Ideology or movement

Trans-exclusionary radical feminism, or gender-critical feminism, by country surveys the development and activities of trans-exclusionary or gender-critical feminist movements across national contexts. This article outlines country-specific examples of organisations, campaigns, legal disputes and alliances; shows how such feminists position themselves in broader anti-gender movements; and assesses their impact on trans rights and contemporary feminist politics in national situations.

Trans-exclusionary radical feminism, also known as gender-critical feminism, is a subset of feminism that rejects transgender and non-binary identities. Trans-exclusionary radical feminists believe that womanhood is solely defined by sex and that sex is biological, immutable, and binary. They view trans women as men and trans men as women. They consider the concepts of gender identity and gender self-identification to be part of an inherently oppressive "gender ideology", a concept which is shared with the right-wing anti-gender movement.

Emerging from fringe movements within second-wave radical feminism mainly in the United States, trans-exclusionary radical feminism has achieved increasing global prominence in the 2010s and 2020s. It has been linked to promotion of disinformation and to the anti-gender movement. Anti-gender rhetoric has seen increasing circulation in trans-exclusionary radical feminist discourse since 2016, including the concept of "gender ideology". In several countries, trans-exclusionary radical feminist groups have formed alliances with right-wing, far-right, and anti-feminist organisations.

== Americas ==
=== Brazil ===
In a 2024 article, sociologists Ana Carolina de Oliveira Marsicano and Tabata Pastore Tesser noted an increase in trans-exclusionary discourse on social media among the Brazilian left.

On 1 October 2025, the Brazilian National Women's Conference voted on a motion to repudiate anti-gender and trans-exclusive movements, with 95% of attendees voting in favor. The motion condemned trans-exclusionary groups MATRIA, LGB Alliance, and Raízes Feministas.

=== Canada ===
In April 2025 Nurse Amy Hamm was found to have committed unprofessional conduct by the British Columbia College of Nurses and Midwives, following lengthy proceedings. She is appealing to the British Columbia Supreme Court. Online comments made by the nurse between July 2018 and March 2021 were considered "discriminatory and derogatory statements" about transgender people. Hamm said she was not transphobic, but worried for the rights of women and girls. In August 2025, she was suspended by the college and asked to pay nearly $94,000 in fees.

=== Mexico ===
According to researchers Siobhan Guerrero McManus and Julianna Stone Neuhouser, gender-critical feminism rose to prominence in Mexico in 2017 following the publication of the essay "Cuando lo trans no es transgresor". They identified two trends in Mexican culture that contributed to the rise of gender-critical feminism: the rise of fourth-wave feminism in Mexico and the Frente Nacional por la Familia's declared opposition to "gender ideology".

=== United States ===
Although trans-exclusionary radical feminism originated in the United States in the 1970s, it has largely fallen out of favor among American feminists. Some trans-exclusionary radical feminist organizations do remain, however, such as WoLF, an organization that operates mainly within the United States.

== Europe ==
=== France ===
In France, the gender-critical or TERF strain of feminism was long understood as less significant or dangerous to trans rights than non-feminist, conservative or religious groups. Journalist Yacha Hajzler described the strain as an extremist minority supported by the political far-right, while Constance Lefebvre dismissed TERFs as a small uninfluential minority of French feminists. However, in the years leading up to 2022, TERFs gained increasing prominence in public discourse. Roux Ange argues that French anti-trans feminism in particular advances a "universalist feminism" that collapses intersectionality.

The French gender-critical feminist movement is closely linked with conservative and far-right movements. Trans-exclusionary feminists Marguerite Stern and Dora Moutot amplify and support anti-trans lobby groups Observatoire de la petite sirène and Ypomoni. Founded in 2021, Little Mermaid Observatory was established by Céline Masson and Caroline Eliacheff to lobby against transgender healthcare for minors.

In 2019, feminist activist Stern, launched a series of collages or posters, sometimes known as the feminist collages movement, that denounce sexist violence. On 22 January 2020, she sparked controversy with her statements in a Twitter thread that trans women were "taking up more and more space in feminism", culminating in her leaving the group of activists and ostracizing her from the broader movement. This controversy led journalists Flavie Motila, Lisa Peyronne and Marielle Poupard to describe Stern as taking the "tête" (lead) of the TERF movement.

On 12 February 2020, a statement authored by journalist Pauline Arrighi was published in Le Huffpost titled "Trans Question". It was signed by 60 people, including Stern, and questioned whether trans women should be able to identify as women. Following protests, the publication removed the statement after only a few hours and apologized that the statement contained comments that went against the values of the publication. The piece was later republished in Marianne with the title "Trans: Is It Enough to Self-Claim as a Woman To Demand To Be Recognized as One?" and garnered over 140 signatories, including sociologist Christine Delphy.

As a rejoinder to Stern's thread and the tribune republished in Marianne, a group of transfeminist authors penned a piece titled "The Debate on the Place of Transfemmes Is Pointless". The piece reaffirmed the importance of solidarity with trans women in the feminist movement and showed how purported 'legitimate concerns' give rise to violent depictions of trans people, and was signed by 1014 individuals and 113 organizations.

Another site of dispute was over NGO Planning Familial's publicity campaign including a cartoon of a pregnant transgender man. Far-right activists first targeted the author of the cartoon on social media, prompting Minister of Equality Isabelle Rome to speak out in the organization's defense. Marguerite Stern and Dora Moutot wrote an opinion column in Marianne addressed to prime minister Élisabeth Borne warning of an 'ideological drift' of Planning Familial. As a result, the pair met Aurore Bergé, president of the majority party La République En Marche, who praised their arguments. Following this meeting, Bergé introduced an amendment to a proposed law to guarantee the right to abortion that would exclude transgender men from accessing this right, which was swiftly criticized by LGBTQI+ associations and described as transphobic.

On 6 January 2023, Stern and Moutot launched a website femelliste.com, containing their "Femelliste Manifesto". It aims to highlight "sexed realities" and the rights of "original and authentic women", concluding that trans women must be removed from the category of womanhood. CJ Gomolka describes this particular brand of gender-critical feminism, sometimes described as "femellisme", as revanchist and a type of "femonationalism". French philosopher Camille Froidevaux-Metterie argues the term "femellisme" is a label invented by the media to give legitimacy to a political stance based in trans hatred. Stern and Moutot have been connected with ultra-conservative groups, conspiracy theorists and the far-right.

This contingent of trans-exclusionary feminists in France highlight one area of contention as freedom of expression and speech. In August 2022, Dora Moutot attacked journalist Hanneli Escurier in an Instagram post. In October 2022, Motout referred to trans mayor Marie Cau as a "transfeminine man" on journalist Léa Salamé's television program. In early 2023, associations Mousse and Stop Homophobie, filed a complaint against Moutot for incitement to hatred, which Cau later joined. In defense of her actions in a piece for Unherd, Moutot argues that French feminism has corrupted and that her and other are "fighting for freedom of expression". A group of 30 figures published an opinion piece in Marianne denouncing the complaint, arguing that it constitutes a threat to freedom of expression.

=== Germany ===
Since 2021, a TERF or gender-critical feminist discourse has developed as an alternative to mainstream feminism in response to the coalition government introducing self-ID legislation. This minority of feminists invokes language of 'biological sex', social contagion and misinformation about transgender violence, citing experiences in the United Kingdom.

The law governing transgender legal recognition in Germany is the Transsexuals Act (TSG), passed in 1980. It has been amended for unconstitutionality and has been the subject of significant criticism from German political society. Due to these issues, the German government aimed to write a new law to replace the TSG, culminating in the proposal of the Self-Determination Act (Selbstbestimmungsgesetz or SPG), published on 30 June 2022. The law was aimed at removing unnecessary bureaucratic requirements for transgender people to change their legal gender in the previous law such as expert assessments and humiliating questionnaires. It was supported by the German Women's Organizations (DF), the main women's organization in Germany that represents over 60 women's associations and groups, and came into effect on 1 November 2024.

However prior to passing, the proposed law was the subject of significant public discourse on its merits, with the most prominent opposition stemming from right-wing actors and gender-critical feminists. Concordant with other hashtag campaigns, #FrauenSagenNein emerged in online German discourse as a way for women to express opposition to the law. In a network analysis of the hashtag, researchers Zahn and Lünenborg identified an alliance between gender-critical feminists and right-wing activists opposing the law.

Alice Schwarzer, German journalist and editor of the feminist magazine Emma, published a book Transsexualität (2022) arguing that a 'trans lobby' was causing young people to falsely see transitioning as a solution to their problems. Schwarzer explicitly invokes the English context of the debate over trans rights, warning that dangers from trans women and academic shifts she claims occurred in the UK might happen in Germany as well. Since 2021, Emma has increasingly focused on transgender issues. The magazine published a series of articles throughout 2022 that advance an exclusionary understanding of womanhood, treating trans identity as a social trend. Amongst invocations of 'social infection' of transgender children, these articles have been described as transphobic and cite disinformation campaigns from the British tabloid Daily Mirror.

One women's rights organization, Terre des Femmes, published a position paper in 2020 titled "Transgender, Self-Determination, and Gender", arguing for the primacy of 'biological sex' over gender and emphasizing the organization's focus on the discrimination against "women and girls". In July 2022, the organization's board voted to withdraw the document, citing damage to the group's reputation and the fact that paper strayed from their inclusive values. In 2023, the minority trans-exclusionary faction led by Inge Bell split from the organization, claiming that the organization had succumbed to identity politics.

Originating as a social media hashtag modeled after right-wing activist Matt Walsh's documentary What Is A Woman?, the initiative "Was ist eine Frau?" (What is a woman?) was started by women's rights activists Rona Duwe and an unnamed individual. It sought answers from the candidates for German federal election on the question "What is a woman?". The campaign was supported by groups Initiative "Let Women Speak!", Women Heroines Association, and the Lesbian Action Center Reloaded. Out of over 2000 candidates, by 6 February 2025, 100 had answered.

=== Iceland ===
According to Women's Declaration International, an anti-trans advocacy group, the number of trans-exclusionary feminists in Iceland is low. According to Owl Fisher, a trans activist, trans rights have been supported by the Icelandic feminist movement for decades.

=== North Macedonia ===
In North Macedonia, 'gender-critical' feminists have aligned themselves with the anti-gender movement, commonly portraying transgender women as a threat to children and women. According to Slavcho Dimitrov, Manja Velichkovska & Irena Cvetkovik, "[a]s a direct consequence, transgender individuals in North Macedonia have faced the repeated failure to pass the newly proposed Law on Legal Gender Recognition". At a series of public forums in 2023, local municipalities hosted gender-critical women's rights activists alongside showings of transphobic films like Matt Walsh's What Is a Woman?.

=== Norway ===
In 2024 the Extremism Commission's report highlighted anti-LGBTIQ+ extremism and also cited sources that pointed to "the connections between radical feminism and Christian conservatism" in relation to anti-trans activism, noting that "these are groups and individuals who use violent and dehumanizing language and are also threatening and extremely active." Gender studies scholar Janne Bromseth argued that "the anti-gender movement has (...) shifted boundaries in the public debate in Norway in recent years," resulting in "a harsher climate of debate where primarily organized TERFs have been given space to set the agenda for the 'debate on gender' and the alleged threat of 'gender ideology' to the natural order."

In late 2025, Kvinneaktivistene hosted Susan Smith of British anti-trans group For Women Scotland on how Norwegian gender-critical activists could draw inspiration from the anti-transgender movement in the United Kingdom. The event drew protests, leading to a police presence as a result of the ensuing "chaos". Later that year, Kvinnefronten and WDI Norway both hosted Reem Alsalem. Alsalem is described by scholars as a key anti-gender actor who has "consistently argued for further barriers and restrictions on legal gender recognition that undercut the rights of transgender individuals," and as part of an increasingly aggressive anti-queer and transphobic movement.

=== Russia ===
In Russia, trans-exclusionary feminists, who position themselves as radical, constitute one of the two main streams of feminism. According to researcher Yana Kirey-Sitnikova, trans-exclusive radical feminism was first "imported" into Russia in 2013. Unlike their opponents adhering to intersectional feminism, the trans-exclusionary group Womenation and a number of other trans-exclusionary feminists supported the Russian invasion of Ukraine in 2022 and came into conflict with Ukrainian feminist movement. Vanya Mark Solovey, a gender researcher, argues that the solidarity of Russian trans-exclusionary feminists with Russian policy towards Ukraine is closely related to the anti-trans sentiments of the Russian authorities.

=== Spain ===
In Spain, the concept gained prominence in 2020 as a result of opposition from certain sections of the proposed “trans law” drafted by the Ministry of Equality, then headed by Irene Montero. This proposal eliminated the requirement to present medical or psychological evidence in order to legally change a person's gender identity, a principle known as gender self-determination.

Sectors within the PSOE and Deputy Prime Minister Carmen Calvo, as well as academic feminists such as Amelia Valcárcel, Alicia Miyares and Lidia Falcón, led a campaign opposing the bill. Valcárcel and Miyares had taken part in the 16th Rosario de Acuña Feminist School in Gijón in 2019, where they gave speeches against trans people that received significant attention and contributed to the popularization of the term TERF in Spain.

In 2019, the Feminist Party led by Falcón issued a statement regarding trans and LGBT laws in Spain, which organizations such as Lambda (collective) and United Left described as an attack on trans people and a form of hate speech. and this ultimately led to the party's expulsion from the left-wing coalition. In the following years, Valcárcel and Falcón were involved in other controversies related to trans and LGBT people.

Finally, the PSOE and Unidas Podemos agreed to present a single law for the equality of trans people and the protection of LGBT rights, which was approved in February 2023 and included gender self-determination. Calvo, who had led opposition to the bill from within the government, abstained during the vote and was ultimately not reappointed as deputy prime minister.

=== Sweden ===
In Sweden, scholars Karlberg, Korolczuk, and Sältenberg have stated that gender-critical discourse is part of the broader anti-gender movement, which they argue contributes to the erosion of liberal democracy through exclusion and marginalization. They describe such discourse as playing a role in what they call "insidious de-democratization," a gradual weakening of liberal norms through the targeting of already vulnerable groups, including trans people. One of the more prominent actors associated with this discourse is the Swedish Women's Lobby (SWL), which has in recent years been criticized for adopting trans-exclusionary positions. In 2021, 943 priests and employees of the Church of Sweden condemned "trans-exclusionary feminism [that] uses rhetoric we recognize from radical right-wing Christian groups and right-wing populists," adding: "We mourn a rights movement that punches down. You, me, we, all of us, need a broad, solidarity-based feminism that fights restrictive gender norms."

In 2025, SWL launched the Women's Platform for Action International (WoPAI), an international anti-gender network promoting "sex-based rights" and opposing what it calls a "queer agenda," a "pro-gender movement" in academia and NGOs, and "non-legal and not agreed upon by the international community concepts of 'gender identity.'" In a joint statement, SWL and WoPAI opposed the inclusion of trans women—whom they referred to as "males who do not wish to be treated in law and practice as men"—in analyses of violence against women.

Observing the launch of Women's Platform for Action International in 2025, Andrea Cornwall discusses the launch as dedicated to promoting "sex-based rights" and as part of a broader anti-gender discourse coalition. She notes that self-described grassroots women's liberation movement activists find common cause with Christian anti-abortion activists in fighting "gender", stating that one activist at the WoPAI launch told her that it "was the power of shared anti-gender antipathy that enabled her to organise across political faultlines that might have sundered potential alliances in any other context."

Elena Crimaldi notes that "Sweden, previously highlighted as a pioneer of feminist and LGBTIQ rights policies, has seen the rise of TERF-aligned groups. The Swedish Women’s Lobby (SWL), established in 1997 as an umbrella organisation uniting 57 associations representing over 130,000 women and girls, now actively opposes the ‘pro-gender movement’. The SWL, which participated in the 2010 Krafttag mot våldtäkter campaign, this year launched the Women’s Platform for Action International, a far-right, anti-transgender association promoting ‘sex-based rights’."

In August 2025, SWL also founded the international anti-gender network "MOTERIS Protecting the Civic Space of Women and Girls", which states that it promotes "sex-based rights" and which includes other gender-critical and anti-gender organizations. MOTERIS states that it works for "material reality" and that "women's existence as a sex-based political class" is being denied by "pseudo-progressive currents." It portrays the criticism of anti-gender politics by academics, NGOs and governments as an infringement of the "civic space" of anti-trans groups, and includes such organizations as Southern Poverty Law Center-designated anti-trans hate group Women's Declaration International.

=== United Kingdom ===
In the United Kingdom, the anti-transgender movement in the U.K. has been described by scholars as building alliances with right-wing and religious fundamentalist groups that oppose trans rights. In July 2025, Sally Hines argued that the mobilization of these groups popularized a discourse centred around "gender ideology," "institutional capture," and "sex‑based rights," and has gained traction within UK parliamentary politics, the Equalities and Human Rights Commission, and conservative media, often via a small network of actors. Sociologists McLean and Stretesky added that "a veritable miasma of anti-trans campaign groups [...] united in their antipathy toward transgender people" has contributed to an anti-trans moral panic in the United Kingdom. They identified anti-trans groups such as FiLiA, Fair Play for Women, Get the L Out, LGB Alliance, Sex Matters, and Transgender Trend.

In 2022, in Resolution 2417, the Council of Europe condemned "the highly prejudicial anti-gender, gender-critical and anti-trans narratives which reduce the fight for the equality of LGBTI people to what these movements deliberately mischaracterise as 'gender ideology' or 'LGBTI ideology'. Such narratives deny the very existence of LGBTI people, dehumanise them, and often falsely portray their rights as being in conflict with women's and children's rights, or societal and family values in general. All of these are deeply damaging to LGBTI people, while also harming women's and children's rights and social cohesion". The resolution further deplored "the extensive and often virulent attacks on the rights of LGBTI people that have been occurring for several years in, among other countries, Hungary, Poland, the Russian Federation, Turkey and the United Kingdom".

Views of movement adherents are common in the British media. The British press frequently publishes articles critical of trans people and trans issues. In 2018, the US version of The Guardian published an editorial condemning an editorial in the UK version of The Guardian for transphobia, because it portrayed trans rights as being opposed to the rights of cis women. Drawing on theory of radicalization, Craig McLean argues that discourse on transgender-related issues in the UK has been radicalized in response to the activities of what he terms the anti-transgender movement that pushes "a radical agenda to deny the basic rights of trans people (...) under the cover of 'free speech'".

The Gender Recognition Act has been a place of contention among movement adherents. In 2016, the House of Commons' Women and Equalities Committee issued a report recommending that the Gender Recognition Act 2004 be updated "in line with the principles of gender self-declaration". Later in 2016, in England and Wales, a proposal was developed under Theresa May's government to revise the Act to introduce self-identification, with a public consultation opening in 2018. This proposed reform became a key locus of conflict, with movement supporters seeking to block reform of the Act, with a number of groups such as Fair Play For Women, For Women Scotland, and Woman's Place UK being formed as a result. 2018 found a significant majority of respondents in favour of the GRA reforms, however, in 2020, Boris Johnson's government dropped the reforms, instead reducing the cost of a gender recognition certificate and moving the application process online.

Another area of conflict has been the stance of LGBT rights charity Stonewall on transgender people. In 2015, Stonewall had begun campaigning for trans equality, with Stonewall head Ruth Hunt apologising for the organisation's previous failure to do so. In 2019, the LGB Alliance was founded in opposition to Stonewall, accusing the organization of having "undermined women's sex-based rights and protections" and attempting "to introduce confusion between biological sex and the notion of gender".

In the 2010s and 2020s, there were the formation of anti-trans groups and spread of the anti-trans messaging on social media. In 2019, gender-critical feminist Sheila Jeffreys and Heather Brunskell-Evans founded Women's Human Rights Campaign, which published a manifesto titled the Declaration on Women's Sex-Based Rights, which argued that recognising trans women as women "constitutes discrimination against women" and called for the "elimination of that act". In 2020, scholar Aleardo Zanghellini stated that "the case against trans inclusion in the United Kingdom has been presented primarily through social media and blog-type or journalistic online platforms lacking the traditional prepublication checks of academic peer review".

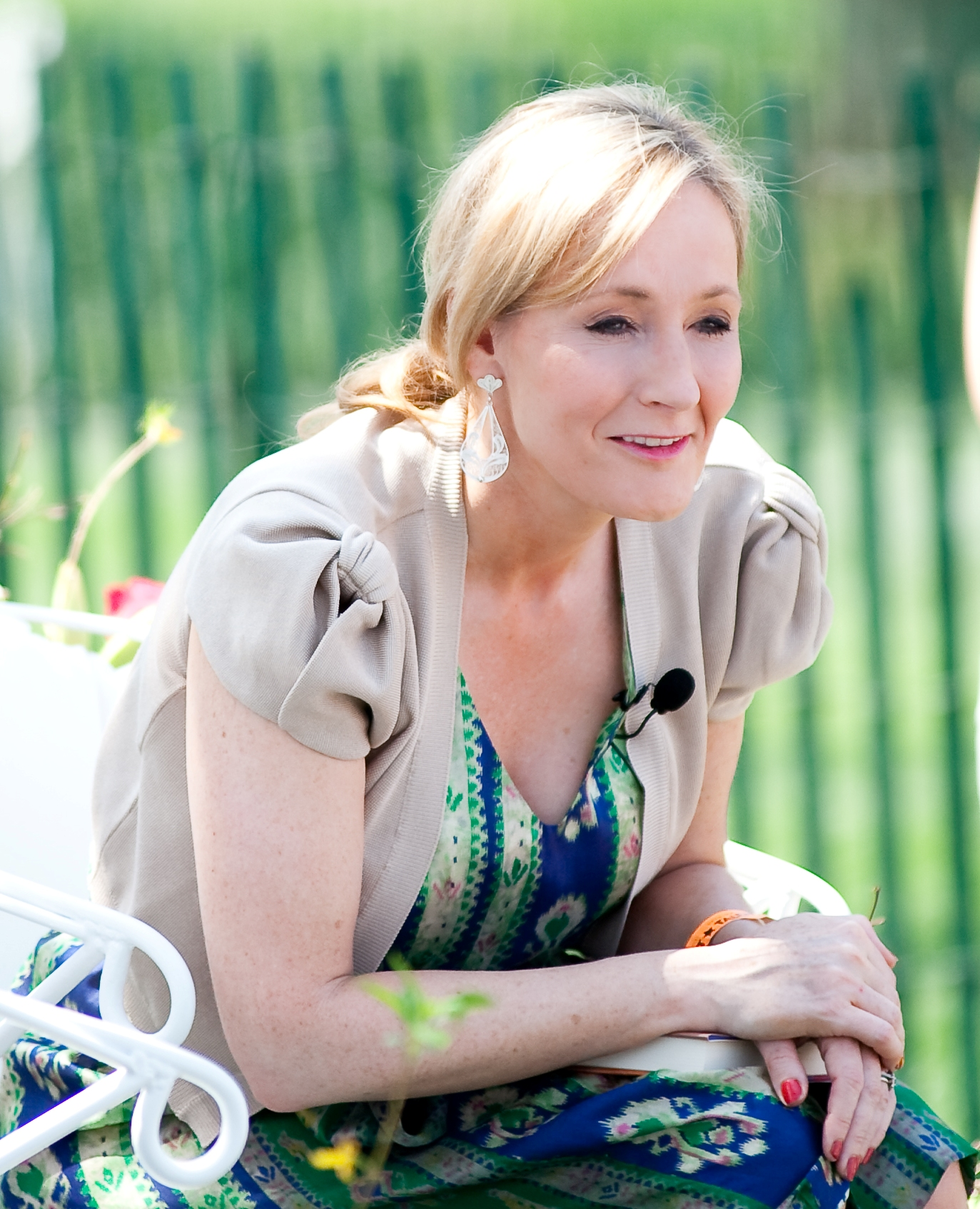
J. K. Rowling is a prominent gender-critical feminist in the United Kingdom.

Some public figures such as Graham Linehan and J. K. Rowling have often been featured in gender-critical social media posts. The Internet forum Mumsnet has also been a prominent hub of online gender-critical discourse.

==== Sex-based rights ====
The term "sex-based rights" is used, primarily in the UK, to refer to a variety of legal positions, including:

- Existing exceptions defined in the UK Equality Act 2010. These exceptions do not grant any right for individuals to be offered single-sex services, but do allow service providers to offer such services, if they are "a proportionate means of achieving a legitimate aim".
- Proposed changes to the Equality Act to clarify sex as meaning biological sex
- The belief that sex is central to the definition of women and women's rights, as opposed to basing law on gender identity.

The gender-critical movement argues that recognition of transgender women as women conflicts with these rights.

==== Legal cases ====
In 2019, the Maya Forstater v Center for Global Development tribunal case was launched by Maya Forstater, crowdfunding over £120,000. Earlier that year, Forstater's consulting contract for the Center for Global Development was not renewed after she made a number of social media posts saying that men cannot change into women. Forstater subsequently sued the center, alleging that she had been discriminated against because of her views. Forstater lost her initial case, with the judge ruling that her beliefs were not protected under the Equality Act due to their absolutism. However, in April 2021, the initial judgement was reversed, with the Employment Appeal Tribunal ruling that gender-critical beliefs were protected under the Equality Act. A full merits hearing on Forstater's claim that she lost her employment as a result of these beliefs was heard in March 2022, and the decision, delivered in July 2022, was that Forstater had been subjected to direct discrimination and victimisation because of her gender-critical beliefs.

In October 2020, Ann Sinnott, at the time a director of the LGB Alliance, initiated a legal case calling for a judicial review of the Equality and Human Rights Commission's guidance on the Equality Act 2010, crowdfunding almost £100,000 for legal fees. In May 2021 the case was found by the court to be unarguable, Justice Henshaw stating that "the claimant has shown no arguable reason to believe the Code has misled or will mislead service providers about their responsibilities under the Act".

The Forstater case has been used as a precedent for several claims of discrimination against people holding gender-critical views. Employment tribunals have delivered successful judgements in cases against a barrister's chambers, Arts Council England, Westminster Council and Social Work England. Claims against Girlguiding UK and United Kingdom Council for Psychotherapy ended in settlements, while a claim against the Department for Work and Pensions failed after the claimant was deemed to have gone too far by misgendering service users. The barrister Georgiana Calvert-Lee commented to the Guardian: "Above all, in a pluralistic society, which is what we want, you have to accept that people are going to have different views."

In January 2024, Jo Phoenix was successful in a claim against the Open University for discrimination on the grounds of gender-critical beliefs. The tribunal ruled that she had been constructively unfairly dismissed, and that she had suffered victimisation and harassment in the form of an open letter from 386 of her colleagues, as well as individual disparagement for her views, including one professor comparing her to "the racist uncle at the Christmas table".

In April 2025, the Supreme Court ruled in the case For Women Scotland Ltd v The Scottish Ministers that "the terms woman and sex in the Equality Act 2010 refer to a biological woman and biological sex".

== Asia ==
=== China ===
China's development of a radical feminist movement has emerged in the context of the South Korean radical feminist movement, particularly the 6B4T principles. Chinese radical feminism has largely grown as an online phenomenon, in the context of decreasing freedom of speech and increased repression of feminist activism via NGOs. Developing into a movement on social media, Chinese radical feminists use platforms like Douban and Weibo to 'spread feminism' and bring gender inequality and violence against women into public consciousness. This movement, first focused on promoting women's rights, eventually evolved in opposition to LGBT activism in China. A particular focus on transgender people started around 2020, with trans weightlifter Laurel Hubbard's participation in the 2020 Olympics and global debates over J. K. Rowling's tweets.

==== Background ====
The idea of 21st century feminism in China has been identified as originating with the 1995 World Conference on Women in Beijing, described by Wang Zheng and Ying Zhang as a "watershed" moment in Chinese feminism. Following the conference, a movement of Chinese feminism developed in non-governmental organizations (NGOs), highlighting a rupture from state-led and Marxist theories of feminism and imported Western concepts of 'gender' into Chinese feminism. These theoretical shifts in framing coincided with political changes in China allowing foreign involvement, resulting in a number of NGOs promoting feminist and LGBT issues.

These NGOs operated within the constraints of Chinese politics, using inside connections to advocate for change while depoliticizing public engagement. However, since 2013 under Xi Jinping's leadership, the Chinese Communist Party has sparked a revival in rhetoric embracing traditional gender roles, framing feminist and LGBT movements as 'foreign imports'. The arrest of the "five feminist sisters" in Beijing in 2015 was the culmination of this campaign, followed by a crackdown on LGBT content, increased repression, and led to a moribund offline feminist movement.

==== Radical feminism in China ====
Chinese radical feminists, known as jinü or jijin nüquan, promote the complete separation from men similar to Western and South Korean radical feminists, but reject any form of organization. Like some Western radical feminists, there are trans-exclusionary voices in this movement, but their influence from the so-called "TERF Wars" in Western contexts leads them to reject cooperation with LGBTQ+ movements altogether. Radical feminists often consider opposition to 'transgenderism' as one of the key defining characteristics distinguishing them from what they call 'free feminists' or 'equal rights fairies'. Chinese radical feminism is also characterized by a reliance on biological essentialism, resonating with the essentialism that characterized Western second-wave feminism. Zehao Pan argues that Chinese radical feminists are the most ardent opponents to trans inclusion, in light of their construction of trans women as a "threat" to cis women and belief in the underlying supremacy of 'biological sex'.

Digital radical feminism later centered around the website Douban, noted for its permissive environment for private groups. These jinü often refer to transgender and other queer people as 异装癖 ('transvestites') and express suspicions about self-defined gender identities. Other derogatory terms used by Chinese radical feminists include nankua ('male transgender') and kuazi ('transgenders').

=== Japan ===
Concordant with global and Japanese national rises in anti-gender and anti-LGBTQ discourse, there has been an increase in anti-transgender discourses in Japanese online media, which since the 2010s has entered Japanese feminist discourses. The pinnacle of the intensification of transphobia came with the 2018 Ochanomizu University's announcement that it would admit transgender students. Both Anglo-European and Korean TERF contexts have influenced Japanese feminist transphobia, but result from a specific Japanese feminist context.

==== Background ====
The first gender affirming surgery in Japan was approved in 1996 by the ethics committee of Saitama Medical University, later performed in 1998. This was followed by the Japan Society of Psychiatry and Neurology publication of Guidelines of Care for Gender Identity Disorder, derived from WPATH guidelines, which led to the broader pathologization of transgender people under the category of 'gender identity disorder'. The 2003 Act on Special Cases in Handling Gender in People with Gender Identity Disorder (GID Act) institutionalized the biomedicalization of transgender identity, simultaneously permitting transsexuals to change gender on their koseki while constraining accepted transition to unmarried childless individuals, which Hidenobu Yamada suggests is to ensure the act would not disrupt patriarchal order. Despite a split in the transgender community, the law received relatively little controversy in Japanese society and anchored the concept of GID as an identity.

Simultaneous with the development of GID and transgender rights discourses, feminism advanced women's rights in Japanese legal structures and culture. The 1990s have been described as a 'booming decade' for Japanese women due to advances in women's rights, as the Japanese government passed multiple laws advancing women's rights and joined international initiatives aimed at advancing equality. Anti-gender backlash movements developed in Japan in response to this progress, often targeting the concept of 'gender-free' (jendā-furī) advanced by feminist advocates, used to describe liberation from gender roles. Anti-gender backlash framed 'gender-free' as diluting the reality of biological sex and any social divisions between men and women. In the context of the LGBT movement, anti-gender-free campaigns accused 'gender-free' feminism of destroying the nuclear family by promoting homosexuality and bisexuality, a means of denying biological sexes. However, feminist campaigners responded to conservative backlash to 'gender-free' not by highlighting the prejudice against LGBT people, but by simply denying they were promoting 'androgynous people'. Researchers like Akiko Shimizu, Kazuyoshi Kawasaka and Hidenobu Yamada argue that mainstream feminism's failure to confront the anti-LGBT sentiments in anti-gender backlash underpin the rise of trans-exclusionary feminism in Japan.

The 2003 GID Act imposed significant restrictions on trans people seeking to change their legal sex registration, requiring that appellants be unmarried, have no children, be sterile and have undergone gender affirmation surgery. These restrictions, particularly the requirement for surgery, have been the subject of criticism by trans activists and legal scholar as a violation of human rights that attempts to impose normative sexuality, prompting calls to replace the GID Special Cases Act. A 2023 Supreme Court ruling found that the reproductive function requirement (sterility) was unconstitutional, violating Article 13 of the Japanese Constitution by violating individuals' freedom from "invasion into their body against their will".

==== Emergence of TERF ====
In 2018, Ochanomizu University, a women's national university in Tokyo, announced they would begin admitting transgender students in 2020, following a growing understanding of LGBTQ rights, including the Science Council of Japan's advisory report. However, feminists online quickly expressed concerns about trans inclusion, mirroring typical transphobic discourses about supposed safety issues in bathrooms. A 2020 quantitative analysis of Twitter posts by Takanori Tamura found that the number of posts containing the phrase "trans woman" increased 36-fold in a month.

In 2019, an essay was published describing a transgender woman who committed suicide after receiving threats on Twitter following the university's announcement. At the women's march in Tokyo on 8 March 2019, campaigners attempted to bring transphobic placard, but the organizers refused them. In April 2019, a statement denouncing trans-exclusion and discrimination was signed by 2715 scholars and feminists. In 2020, the women's group Women's Action Group published an article 'It’s Not That We Are Excluding Transgender People' by an anonymous self-described 'gender-critical' author who framed trans women as threats to cis women's safety and denounced the term 'TERF' as derogatory.

Another aspect relevant to the rise of anti-transgender feminism in Japan is Anglo-European political discourses on transgender rights. Shimizu Akiko argues that before 2018, there was not a significant anti-transgender discourse in Japanese feminism. By the end of 2018, however, internet users imported terminology and discourses from Anglophone and Korean spaces to express their opposition to trans rights. Korean feminist discourses, such as the 4B movement, have also influenced Japanese anti-trans feminism.

Japanese feminists began to translate British gender-critical feminist material and other trans-antagonistic media, while pro-transgender feminists and activists translated the responses. However, in contrast to South Korean translations of Anglophone feminist works, Japanese versions of popular feminist works were more commonly translated by academics rather than TERFs and have not received as much popular success.

Just as in other countries, Japanese anti-trans radical feminists have made alliances with the far-right. Kazuyoshi Kawasaka argues that anti-transgender feminist discourses have 're-energised' conservative activism against LGBTQ rights politics. Some anti-trans feminists have argued they are compelled to support the ultraconservative Liberal Democratic Party (LDP), and famous radical feminist novelist Yoriko Shono professed her support for LDP politician Yamatani Eriko in a "single-issue alliance" to oppose gender self-identification.

==== Save Women's Spaces ====
A private organization Save Women's Spaces JP was founded in September 2021. In October 2021, the organization joined Women's Declaration International, an anti-trans group that has been described as gender-critical. The group has lobbied against the LGBT Understanding Promotion Act, a law that establishes basic principles regarding the promotion of measures to broaden understanding of lesbian, gay, bisexual, and transgender (LGBT) people and other sexual minorities in Japan. The law was later criticized by LGBTQ activists for being ineffective at addressing the issues of the LGBTQ community in Japan. The organization filed a lawsuit in 2022 against Liu Lingjun, a man who had criticized the organization, calling it a "malicious anti-trans group". In July 2024, the lawsuit was dismissed on the grounds that the social media comment did not go further than opinion or commentary. Minori Moriya, co-chair of Save Women's Spaces, was invited to a 2023 meeting establishing a group of LDP lawmakers aimed at 'dispelling concerns' that the LGBT Understanding Promotion Act would allow transgender women to use women's spaces. This group, called the "Parliamentary League to Protect Women", started work to create a law to protect women's spaces in May 2025.

=== South Korea ===
In 2016, the radical feminist online community Womad split from the larger radical feminist online community Megalia after Megalia issued a ban on the use of certain explicit slurs against gay men and transgender people. This change in policy led to the migration of anti-LGBT members.

In February 2020, Sookmyung Women's University accepted its first transgender student. The decision prompted a strong backlash both within and outside of the university, including from radical feminist student organizations. Nearly 20,000 students and alumni of various women's universities in South Korea signed a petition to bar the student from being accepted. However, some students, and the university's Student and Minority Human Rights Commission, supported the decision.

Lee Hyun-Jae has noted that in the South Korean "feminism reboot" of the early 21st century, the radical stance of recent feminists have been "oriented in an identity politics based on biological sex", and that "the radical stance of today's [young] feminists has a tendency to emphasize the identity of the 'female body' as based on the category of the 'biological woman,' taking an attitude of excluding 'biological' men refugees, and transgender people". Jinsook Kim has noted that "in Korean contexts, there have been increasing concerns over popular forms of feminism based on a strong female identity rooted in notions of biological sex, the pursuit of female-only and -first politics, and the refusal of solidarity with other social minority groups".

=== Turkey ===
In Turkey, the division between trans-inclusion and trans-exclusion has a longer historical grounding. Both feminist and trans rights movements have their roots in activism that began after the 1980 military coup. However, trans exclusionary feminism has become more salient within the Turkish feminist movement since 2018. Lara Özlen argues that, rather than a direct import of anti-trans feminisms from the UK, Turkish TERF has to be understood in the context of Turkish feminist history and recent right-wing provocations.

==== Background ====
Turkish feminism, while having more distant historical origins in the Ottoman empire, swelled into a proper movement after the 1980 military coup d'etat. Largely middle-class, urban, educated women, this burgeoning wave of feminist activism embraced language such as patriarchy, sexism, gender inequality to describe society. Alongside a development in feminist consciousness, a LGBT rights movement also developed in Turkey, commonly cited as being sparked by the 1987 hunger strikes in Gezi Park by trans sex workers. Also in 1987 was the Campaign Against the Battering of Women, when women in Istanbul marched at Yogurtcu Park to protest woman battering. These public displays of protest and calls for action brought feminism and LGBT rights issues to the forefront of social discourse and public awareness. Feminists like Ayşe Düzkan highlight the presence of trans women in the early feminist movement, including at Yogurtcu Park. Upon its original emergence in the 1990s, the LGBT rights movement in Turkey had broader support among social groups like feminists, ecologists and anarchists. Despite differences in goals advanced by these more concrete movements of feminism and LGBT activism, there was overlap on opposition to gender killings. Broader Turkish civil society also conflated the two in crackdowns, integrating the two in opposition to the state.

==== TERF in Turkey ====
Opposition to trans inclusion in Turkey has historical roots: Kurdish trans women Esmeray and Demet initially faced opposition in some feminist spaces in the 1990s, being accused of harboring "male energy".

During the International Women's Day (March 8) parade in 2011, a trans man participant was told that "men are not allowed in this space" and asked to exit. As a result, Amargi, a feminist social collective and magazine, organized a roundtable focusing on the inclusion of trans people in the Turkish feminist movement, which was held in 2011 and 2012. According to academic Lara Özlen, the discussions partially ameliorated divisions between queer activists and cis feminists, but did not fully resolve the controversy.

In late 2018 and 2019, feminist academics began to share anti-trans texts from Anglosphere contexts, which grew into a more hostile debate on social media by 2019. These debates, largely on social media platforms like Twitter, invoked discourses about hormone replacement therapy, desistance, and the concept of male privilege. These cis feminists commonly cited UK-based sources during these debates. In response to the 'TERF debate', LGBT groups Kaos GL and Pink Life Association issued statements condemning transphobia.

In February 2021, a group Kadınız Öfkeliyiz (KÖ, We Are Women, We Are Angry) was launched, described by philosopher Büşra Tosun Durmuş as "producing discourse in defense of biological womanhood". The group tried to sabotage the March 8th protests in March 2022 with transphobic signs, but they were denied entry to the parade.
