= Peggie v NHS Fife =

UK employment tribunal case

Peggie vs Fife Health Board and Dr. B Upton is an employment tribunal case heard in Dundee, Scotland. The formal claim was submitted in May 2024 by Sandie Peggie, a nurse at NHS Fife's Victoria Hospital, against NHS Fife and Dr. Beth Upton, a transgender woman working at the same hospital. Peggie alleged sexual harassment, belief discrimination and victimisation under the Equality Act 2010 after she was placed on leave following an incident in which she confronted Upton for being in the women's changing room.

The tribunal, whose live stream attracted a global audience, heard arguments in February 2025, and resumed in July 2025 to hear 20 days of evidence. The judgment was delivered in December 2025 with the harassment claim against NHS Fife being upheld but all other allegations including all allegations against Upton being dismissed. Peggie's lawyers announced that they would be appealing and in August 2026 senior judge, James Taylor, ruled there were “reasonable” grounds for challenge on 13 counts of the judgment.

== Background ==
Sandie Peggie said she first saw Dr. Beth Upton in a female changing room in August 2023, and raised the matter with her line manager. She reported that a second incident occurred in late October or November 2023 when Upton walked into a female changing room while she was wearing her bra and work trousers, again following up the matter with her line manager. On 24 December 2023, Peggie and Upton had an argument. Upton said that Peggie compared Upton using the women's changing room to the presence of transgender rapist Isla Bryson in a women's prison. The Fife Health Board logged the incident as a "hate incident", and said that Upton had handled the incident correctly. According to a witness, Upton was "very shaken", "visibly distressed and upset", "quite pale", and "startled" following the confrontation.

Following this, Upton reached out to NHS Fife for support and made a report alleging bullying and harassment. Later, Upton added patient safety concerns to the report. Upton said that after she had appeared in a resuscitation cubicle to attend to a patient in serious condition, Peggie—who was with the patient at the time—left and asked Upton to complete her nursing duties. Peggie meanwhile filed a complaint saying that she felt intimidated and embarrassed at sharing a changing room with a trans woman. After the 24 December incident, Peggie was placed on "special leave" until April.

An internal investigation was launched by NHS Fife, which alleged misconduct, failures of patient care, and the misgendering of Upton. The investigation took nine months, ending in December 2024 with a recommendation for a formal hearing. In July 2025, Peggie was cleared of all charges in the internal investigation, as NHS Fife stated there was "insufficient evidence" to support a finding of misconduct. The report concluded that Upton's description of the alleged incident in the resuscitation area "would seem unlikely".

== Tribunal case ==
On 3 January 2025 Peggie filed an employment tribunal case against both NHS Fife and Upton herself, alleging either sexual harassment or harassment related to a protected belief under the Equality Act 2010, and alleging that she had been forced to change clothes in front of a transgender woman, who Peggie considers to be male. NHS Fife denied that Peggie had been harassed, and described naming Upton a defendant as "unnecessary and vexatious". Several gender-critical groups quickly became involved, most notably Sex Matters, and while NHS Fife and Upton requested that the case be heard in private, Judge Antoine Tinnion ordered, in favour of the claimant, that the case be heard in public.

On 27 January, employment judge Sandy Kemp ruled that Peggie and her legal team would be allowed to misgender Upton throughout the tribunal, stating the while it might cause anguish for Upton, misgendering someone did not constitute harassment, as it would be in his view unfair to force Peggie and her lawyers to use terms that they considered inaccurate. The spokesperson for NHS Fife described this as "activism ... contributing to a climate of hostility and hatred towards trans people".

=== Representation and cost ===
Peggie is represented at the tribunal by barristers Naomi Cunningham, the chair of advocacy group Sex Matters, and Charlotte Elves. NHS Fife and Upton are both represented by Jane Russell KC, the barrister who had represented the Centre for Global Development in Forstater v Centre for Global Development Europe, the case that set the precedent for the legal protection of gender-critical beliefs.

Following Freedom of Information Act requests, the Scottish Information Commissioner required NHS Fife to publish the cost of its legal fees. NHS Fife has spent at least £220,500 on its legal defence. Its liability is limited to £25,000 with its remaining expenses paid by a scheme protecting health boards. The financial support for Peggie's case is not known.

=== Hearing ===
The ten-day-long hearing began on 3 February. On the second day of evidence, Peggie confirmed calling Upton a man, but stated that she had been unaware that Isla Bryson was a rapist, and that she "never compared Beth to being a rapist", and that she was instead "describing how women must feel with a man in a female prison" and that she had told Upton that "it was unacceptable that [she] was in the female changing area" after Upton had started getting changed. Upton denied ever being undressed during the exchange.

Peggie acknowledged that her misgendering behaviour was considered harassment under NHS Fife's diversity guidance, and also admitted to having strong political opinions, including admiration for United States President Donald Trump. Peggie said that the interaction on 24 December 2023 left her trembling afterwards, and added that "Everyone sticks up for the minority". The clinical service manager tasked with reviewing Peggie's suspension mentioned that other senior NHS Fife staff members alleged that Peggie had previously been involved in racist incidents in the workplace, but that these incidents had never been documented by the NHS. Following elements of Upton's complaint regarding risks to patient care, the tribunal later heard that Peggie had a history of making racist jokes, principally regarding people of Pakistani descent, and including suggesting posting bacon through the doors of a mosque. Peggie defended these incidents as "dark humour", and acknowledged a history of using racial slurs, but defended it on the grounds that it was not "politically correct" and that she was "brought up like that".

NHS Fife lawyer Jane Russell alleged that Peggie had delegated jobs which Upton had asked her to do, and—in reference to Peggie allegedly leaving a patient in serious condition—Russell said "Your dislike of Dr. Upton was so strong that you refused to work with her to the disadvantage of patients". Peggie denied the claims that she had left a patient due to Upton's presence and that she had asked Upton to perform duties that should have been performed by a nurse. Peggie's lawyer—Naomi Cunningham, chair of Sex Matters—meanwhile questioned the merits of the patient safety concern, due to lack of evidence corroborating Upton's complaint regarding patient care, and the fact that human resources at NHS Fife did not take the complaint seriously.

Cunningham further cited that there had been no previous complaints about Peggie, and said that a better option would have been to keep them on separate shifts, and to find Upton a segregated changing room.

Under cross-examination, Upton answered that she did not believe that she needed to proactively disclose her transgender status to patients, as it was personal information, but that requests to see other physicians would be accommodated. Cunningham called this policy cruel to patients who might have previous sexual trauma, and then told the court that Peggie had upset Upton by challenging her presence in female changing rooms in a way that would interrupt what Cunningham called "an immersive role play". Upton denied this, saying that the majority of her coworkers didn't see her as a man, that she wasn't obviously trans, and that she was just asking to be treated with respect by her colleagues.

Cunningham also questioned whether the General Medical Council had "falsified public record" in allowing Upton to change her first name on official documents.

=== Judgment ===
In December 2025, the tribunal ruled that NHS Fife had committed harassment against Peggie but dismissed claims of victimisation and both direct and indirect discrimination, including all claims against Upton. NHS Fife was found to have committed harassment against Peggie by failing to revoke Upton's changing room permissions after Peggie complained until the two were put on to different rotas and by not establishing that Peggie's impermissible manifestation of her beliefs was the reason for detriments during the investigation. The judgment said that Peggie had likely harassed Upton.

On 11 December 2025, the tribunal issued a Certificate of Correction for the 312 page written judgement, replacing a quote from Forstater v CGD that was described as "made up", with a genuine quote from the case. A second certificate was issued on 23 December, correcting 11 further errors. None of the errors affect the ruling in the case.

== Response ==
According to PinkNews, in the days leading up to the tribunal, anti-trans Twitter accounts posted hundreds of times in support of Peggie while misgendering Upton, with many referring to her as a "thing" and "mentally unwell".

The tribunal was initially listed to take place in Edinburgh, but was moved to Dundee because of alleged threats of physical violence toward Peggie's legal team. NHS Fife allege that they have received threats of physical and sexual violence towards their staff that required police involvement as a result of the case, and issued a statement regarding this blaming "misinformation" and criticising Sex Matters for attempting to "steer public opinion".

Gender-critical author J. K. Rowling publicly supported Peggie on several occasions. Rowling said Peggie was a "heroine" embattled against "smug management" and the class-based imposition of what Rowling called "gender identity ideology" in the workplace.

=== Responses to the judgment ===
In response to the judgment Peggie said that she was "beyond relieved and delighted that the tribunal has found that my employer Fife Health Board harassed me".

Fife health board responded that they recognised this was a "complex and lengthy process" and acknowledged the "careful consideration" of the tribunal panel. They said that their "focus now is to ensure that NHS Fife remains a supportive and inclusive environment for all employees and our patients".

Maya Forstater CEO of Sex Matters said that "it was a travesty that a woman can be judged as having expressed herself in the wrong way" and hoped the judgment would be appealed. Robin Moira White, a discrimination lawyer, said that it was a "very sensible, balanced judgment" and that "This is showing trans people need to be accommodated appropriately in workplaces".

Baroness Falkner, who had left her post as Chair of the Equality and Human Rights Commission days earlier and had supported the judgment in For Women Scotland Ltd v The Scottish Ministers, said that "on the face of it" the Peggie v NHS Fife judgment appeared "not be to be compatible" with the earlier Supreme Court ruling.

=== Appeal against judgement ===
Sandie Peggie's legal team has appealed against the judgement, claiming that the employment tribunal judgment applied the "wrong legal analysis" to determine whether NHS Fife could lawfully permit a transgender doctor to use the women's changing room.

== S Peggie v Royal College of Nursing ==
Sandie Peggie also brought a claim of discrimination against the Royal College of Nursing, stating that it had failed to adequately support her during the case against NHS Fife and Dr Upton because of her beliefs. Her claim was rejected by the employment tribunal, who stated that the RCN had not discriminated against her. In a press release, the RCN described the judgment as comprehensive, and that it demonstrated the non-discriminatory nature of the RCN. Peggie announced that she would appeal.

== See also ==
- Anti-transgender movement in the United Kingdom
- For Women Scotland Ltd v The Scottish Ministers
- Hutchison and others v County Durham and Darlington NHS Trust
- Transgender rights in the United Kingdom
