= Naomi Cunningham =

British lawyer (born 1966)

- Born: October 1966 (age 60)
- Education: University of Reading, University of Bristol, Inns of Court School of Law
- Occupation: Barrister
- Known for: Discrimination and employment law

Naomi Brigid Cunningham (born October 1966) is a British barrister who specialises in discrimination and employment law. A member of Outer Temple Chambers in London, she is the author of a book on employment tribunals. She was chair of the advocacy group Sex Matters from 2024 to 2025 and founded the Sex and Gender Law Association in June 2026.

== Background and education ==
Cunningham was born the eldest of two children to Ann (née Lavell) and Charles Cunningham in Gloucestershire. Both her parents worked for GCHQ and had worked at Bletchley Park during World War II. Her father, who was originally from Glasgow, trained as a barrister at the age of 57. Cunningham credits her father with having shown her that law was "a thing you could do", which influenced her own choice of career.

She attended the University of Reading, where she studied mathematics for two years before switching courses and graduating in 1991 with an LLB in Law. She then obtained a Masters degree in Law from the University of Bristol before completing the Bar Vocational Course at the Inns of Court School of Law in 1993.

== Career ==
Cunningham worked in the voluntary sector for the first ten years of her career. This involved work in a number of law centres, including Tower Hamlets Law Centre, where she advised on immigration and employment law and joined the employment group in 1998. From 2000 to 2004, she worked for the Free Representation Unit. She then became a member of Outer Temple Chambers, where she remains as of 2026, specialising in employment and discrimination law.

In the 2020s, Cunningham developed an interest in legal issues relating to sex and gender and whether biological sex outweighs gender identity, having been inspired by discussion with Anya Palmer, the barrister who represented Maya Forstater in her case against the Centre for Global Development Europe. Having considered retirement, she decided to continue her career to represent women with gender-critical beliefs.

In 2021, she joined the board of Sex Matters, a group which campaigns for women's sex-based rights and is described by transgender rights advocates such as the Good Law Project as anti-trans. She stepped down as chair in December 2025. She then set up the Sex and Gender Law Association, which held its inaugural meeting at the London School of Economics on 4 June 2026.

Cunningham's work has met with disapproval from transgender rights advocates; she was twice reported to the Bar Standards Board, who rejected the complaints without further investigation.

== Notable cases ==
In Kwamin v Abbey National (2004) Cunningham successfully argued in the Employment Appeal Tribunal that a delay in promulgating a judgment rendered it unsafe, as a loss of recollection by tribunal members had led to errors in fact finding and conclusions.

From 2016 to 2021, she was one of a team of barristers from Outer Temple Chambers representing Asda shop workers in an equal pay dispute, in which the Supreme Court ruled that the claimants could use depot workers as comparators.

In 2023, she successfully acted for social worker Rachel Meade, who had been harassed and discriminated against on account of her gender-critical beliefs, in her employment tribunal against Westminster City Council and the regulatory body Social Work England.

In 2024, she secured £56,000 compensation for social worker Lizzy Pitt, whose employer, Cambridgeshire County Council had harassed and discriminated against her on account of her gender-critical beliefs and sexual orientation. The council admitted liability and agreed remedy on the first day of the tribunal. The council also agreed to include a section on "freedom of belief and speech in the workplace" in its mandatory e-learning.

Cunningham represented nurse Sandie Peggie in Peggie v NHS Fife, an employment case, filed in 2024, in which Peggie alleged sexual harassment, belief discrimination and victimisation against NHS Fife, and sexual harassment against Beth Upton, a trans woman and doctor at Victoria Hospital, for using the women's changing room with the approval of NHS Fife. The case ended in a partial victory for Peggie, who won four grounds of her harassment claim against NHS Fife, but lost the rest of her claims, including that against Upton. Peggie submitted an appeal, which is due to be heard in 2027. Cunningham also represented Peggie in her unsuccessful claim against her union, the Royal College of Nursing, which she claimed had failed to support her in her case against NHS Fife.

== Writing ==
In 2005 Cunningham published Employment Tribunal Claims: Tactics and Precedents, with the 2nd to 4th editions being co-authored by Michael Reed and royalties donated to the Free Representation Unit.

In 2026 Cunningham co-authored a chapter with Michael Foran on "Sport and UK Law" in Sex, Gender Identity and Sport, edited by C. Devine.

She also writes for The Legal Feminist.

== Recognition ==
Cunningham was named in The Lawyer magazine's hot hundred in 2022.

She featured as lawyer of the week in The Times on 9 May 2024 after acting for Rachel Meade in her employment tribunal claim.

She was ranked as "Band 1" in the 2027 Chambers and Partners legal rankings.

== Personal life ==
Cunningham is married to barrister Tim Pitt-Payne.

Interviewed by Holyrood in March 2025, Cunningham talked about her views on sex and gender, saying that she disliked the term "gender-critical". She described herself as having been a "gender-non-conforming child", saying: "it did occur to me that I'd be at risk of being pushed towards childhood transition if I'd been 30 years later". She said she was "fuelled by rage" because "there are so many things to be profoundly angry about: the grooming of children into mental ill-health and mutilation; the bullying, silencing and cancelling; the corruption of so many institutions; the sheer waste of time, money and energy on dealing with such nonsense". On the subject of preferred pronouns, she said: "I started thinking that the people who wouldn't use preferred pronouns were a bit mean, that it wasn't kind. Why can't we just be polite?" She explained why her views gradually changed: "You can't say what the problem is with a man at a rape crisis centre who says he's a woman, unless you can say the problem is that he's a man. If you have to say 'the problem is she is a transwoman', it sounds as if you're objecting to a certain sort of woman. You've got to be able to use real language. I'm getting more and more determined to use real language in court."
