= Hutchison and others v County Durham and Darlington NHS Trust =

Employment tribunal case concerning sex and gender rights in the UK

Hutchison and others v County Durham and Darlington NHS Trust was an employment tribunal case in the United Kingdom between a group of eight female nurses and the County Durham and Darlington NHS Trust over a policy at Darlington Memorial Hospital allowing transgender women to use women's facilities. On 16 January 2026 the tribunal judgement was published, concluding that the NHS trust had harassed and discriminated against the nurses by requiring them to share a changing room with a transgender women and by not taking the nurses concerns seriously.

== Background ==
The case centered around transgender woman Rose Henderson using the women's changing room since 2019, although beyond that the facts of the case were vastly disputed.

According to the nurses, Henderson had at some point stopped taking her hormone medication in order to be able to get her girlfriend pregnant, thus making her "a sexually active biological male"; and they had submitted a group complaint letter to their bosses alleging such. Henderson denies that she ever stopped her hormone therapy, saying that she had only ever mentioned the abstract possibility of getting her girlfriend pregnant during a theoretical discussion with colleagues. Beth Hutchison, the nurse leading the case, said that she found anything Henderson said difficult to believe given that she was "a man pretending to be a woman".

=== Incident ===
According to Danson, in September 2023 she had walked past Henderson in the changing room without paying much attention, until she'd heard Henderson speak in a "male voice" and turned to see Henderson in her underwear, midway through getting changed. According to the NHS' Solicitor, Simon Cheetham KC, Henderson said nothing to Danson, however Danson alleges that Henderson had repeatedly asked her "Are you not getting changed yet?” while staring at her and smirking; and that this had given her flashbacks of suffering sexual abuse as a child.

Following this, Danson said that NHS managers had sat her down in a wellbeing room with a box of tissues and a cup of tea as she'd sobbed; however the NHS said that there was an "absence of records" regarding any such meetings.

== Lawsuit ==
Legal action was initiated in May 2024 by Nurses Bethany Hutchison, Joanne Bradbury, Mary Annice Grundy, Lisa Lockey, Karen Danson, Carly Hoy, Tracey Anne Hooper, and Jane Peveller. It was supported by The Christian Legal Centre and J. K. Rowling. They alleged sexual harassment, discrimination, victimisation, and breaches of their rights to privacy under the European Convention on Human Rights, with Hutchison saying that “We are nurses who love our jobs and our patients and only want to be afforded the dignity of getting dressed and undressed for work without a man present. I would like to remind everyone that we are doing this for the safety and dignity of every woman and girl across society and that we will continue to fight these unlawful policies.”

The case was heard by the Newcastle Employment Tribunal.

== Context ==
In April 2025, while the Darlington nurse's lawsuit was ongoing, the UK Supreme Court issued its judgement in For Women Scotland Ltd v The Scottish Ministers, which ruled that the term "woman" under UK law referred to "biological women and biological sex". Following the judgement, the Equality and Human Rights Commission said that the NHS would be "pursued" if policies on sex-segregated facilities were not updated to fall in line with the judgement. The Department of Health and Social Care meanwhile said that "We are clear that this is the law, and we expect all public service bodies, including hospitals like Darlington Memorial, to comply." In response, Hutchison expressed delight, saying that "Stonewall-inspired policies that have allowed men to access women’s changing rooms in the NHS need to be urgently overhauled, and women like ourselves who have been discriminated against, as result of these policies, need full justice".

== Response to judgement ==
County Durham and Darlington NHS Foundation Trust responded to the judgement by stating: “We are taking time to review the judgment carefully and will comment further once we have had the opportunity to consider it in full.”

== See also ==
- Anti-transgender movement in the United Kingdom
- Bell v Tavistock
- Forstater v Centre for Global Development Europe
- Peggie v NHS Fife
