= Steph Richards (activist) =

British activist

Steph Richards (born 1952-1953) is a British women's rights and transgender rights activist, who has served at various times as CEO and representative for the charity Endometriosis South Coast. Her appointment and service in the role have been controversial and met with backlash in the UK due to her status as a transgender woman.

She has also founded and led the transgender rights organization TransLuscent, and has served as a Women's Officer for the Portsmouth Labour Party.

== Career ==
=== Endometriosis South Coast ===
In November 2023, Richards was appointed as CEO of the charity Endometriosis South Coast, which serves those suffering from endometriosis or who are seeking a diagnosis, after a 20 year background in medical research of the condition. This was met with immediate backlash both from the media (and in particular the BBC) and from the gender-critical movement, due to Richards not possessing a womb. Helen Joyce of Sex Matters called Richards' appointment "outrageous under any circumstance". Both Richards and the charity defended her appointment, by pointing out the validity of her professional qualifications, her extensive experience campaigning for women's health, and stating that few people raise such outrage about the number of men working as gynecologists or midwives. The sustained campaign later caused Richards to step down as CEO in 2024.

In 2026, Richards was appointed to serve as a representative for the organization to members of parliament, which was met with renewed outrage led by gender-critical and Conservative figures. Gender-critical MP Rosie Duffield said that being invited to a charity event by Richards made her feel "uncomfortable", while Suella Braverman of the Reform Party called Richards' appointment "insulting" to women and "regressive". Following this pressure, Richards stepped down as representative and left the charity, saying that it was in the best interests of both herself and the charity for her to do so.

=== Labour Party ===
Richards has in the past served as a Women's Officer for the Portsmouth Labour Party. In 2025, she was nominated to serve as Labour's LGBT women's officer, however by then the Labour Party had begun moving to side against the cause of trans rights more generally, and thus her nomination was met with accusations and rebuking from others within the party.

=== Transgender rights ===
Richards has spoken out more broadly in favor of transgender rights in the UK, including by founding the website Steph's Place UK, which was one of the organizations that tried to have the Equality and Human Rights Commission stripped of its international accreditation for its actions regarding transgender rights and conversion therapy in the UK. She is also the founder and former CEO of the transgender rights organization TransLuscent.
