= Karon Monaghan =

British lawyer

Karon Monaghan KC
- Occupation: Barrister
- Employer(s): Inner Temple, Matrix Chambers, London
- Known for: Equality and human rights law

Karon Monaghan KC is a British barrister specialising in equality and human rights law, employment law and civil actions.

== Career ==
Monaghan is a member of the Equality and Human Rights Commission's panel of preferred counsel. She was named Employment Silk in 2017 and the 2017 Legal 500 Awards, and was named Liberty’s Human Rights Lawyer of the Year in 2010.

Monaghan investigated sexual harassment in the GMB in 2020. The Monaghan investigation followed the resignation of General Secretary Tim Roache and concluded that "bullying, misogyny, cronyism, and sexual harassment were endemic" in the union. and that it was 'institutionally sexist'.

Monaghan acted for IOPC, to prove "institutional discrimination" in the Metropolitan Police.

In 2022 she acted for Maya Forstater in Forstater v. CGD Europe and others in a landmark case about “gender critical” beliefs and the Human Rights Act and Equality Act.
