= Anya Palmer =

- Occupation: Barrister
- Employer: Old Square Chambers

Anya Palmer is a British barrister specialising in employment law.

== Career ==
She has worked on a number of high-profile employment tribunals and appeals.named in The Lawyer’s Hot 100 in 2023

Called to the Bar in 1999. Alumna of University of East London (1989) and London Guildhall University (1997).

Palmer worked for Stonewall, on high-profile test cases to establish equal rights for lesbians and gay men.

She acted for Maya Forstater in Forstater vs Centre for Global Development, a case which won discrimination protections for those who hold gender critical feminist beliefs. This established that a person holding gender critical beliefs can not be discriminated against for just holding such beliefs.

Palmer acted for NHS whistleblower Sonia Appleby in her claim against the Tavistock clinic. Appleby reported concerns about practice at the Gender Identity Development Service (GIDS), a specialist service for children. The employment Tribunal awarded Appleby £20,000 in damagaes.

Palmer is a trustee of Sex Matters, a charity that campaigns for clarity on sex in law and policy.

== Writing ==
As a legal scholar she writes about issues which impact employers in relation to the 2010 UK Equality Act.

- Palmer, Anya (1993). Less equal than others: a survey of lesbians and gay men at work. London: Stonewall.
- Brexit: The LGBT Impact Assessment
