= Anti-transgender movement in the United Kingdom =

The early 21st century has seen a rise of anti-transgender sentiment in the United Kingdom and increasing organisation in support of it. The most common strain is that of gender-critical feminism, although anti-trans advocacy in Britain exists across the political spectrum, including anti-feminists. The movement has led to substantial rollbacks in the rights of transgender people, including in the areas of gender self-identification, access to gender-affirming care, education, access to sport, the justice system, and access to social services.

== Background ==
=== Gender Recognition Act 2004 ===
In 1970, a judge ruled that transgender individuals in the United Kingdom could not change the sex recorded on their birth certificates. Following legal advocacy by trans rights organisations, the European Court of Human Rights issued a ruling that the UK government's policy was in breach of human rights. This led to the implementation of the Gender Recognition Act 2004 (GRA). The GRA allowed trans individuals to change their legal sex if they obtained a medical diagnosis of gender dysphoria and had lived for two years as their "acquired" gender.

In June 2020, the European Commission said these medical requirements were "intrusive" and inconsistent with international human rights standards. In 2021, the Parliamentary Women and Equalities Committee and the United Nations Independent Expert on sexual orientation and gender identity also called for the adoption of gender self-identification as policy.

=== Trans-exclusionary radical feminism ===
Anti-transgender advocacy in the United Kingdom differs from opposition in other countries in that it initially arose among feminist advocates heavily present on Mumsnet, who said they were defending women's rights. This gave rise to the nickname "TERF Island" for Great Britain. The term TERF derives from trans-exclusionary radical feminism, otherwise known as gender-critical feminism, and is viewed by many within the movement as a slur, but embraced by others. (Note: The term, TERF, was coined by a radical feminist to distinguish between those who included trans people and those who did not.) This is an ideology or movement that opposes what it refers to as "gender ideology", the concept of gender identity and transgender rights, particularly gender self-identification. Gender-critical feminists believe that sex is determined by biology and immutable, and believe gender, including both gender identity and gender roles, is inherently oppressive. They reject the concept of transgender identities, and have formed alliances with right-wing, far-right, and anti-feminist organisations that have campaigned for the rollback of trans rights and restrictions on transgender health care. British gender critical groups have allied with the Christian right and alt-right in the United States, in particular.

Feminist and scholarly critics have described gender-critical feminism as transphobic, and it is opposed by numerous feminist, LGBTQ rights, and human rights organisations. The Council of Europe has condemned gender-critical ideology, along with other ideologies it says are linked to "virulent attacks on the rights of LGBTI people" in countries such as Hungary, Poland, Russia, Turkey, and the United Kingdom. UN Women has categorised the gender-critical movement as one of several extreme anti-rights movements that utilise hate propaganda and disinformation.

== Organisations ==
Efforts to restrict transgender rights have arisen across the traditional left–right political spectrum, with prominent advocates representing the far right and explicit anti-feminism as well as left-wing feminism and lesbians. Starting in the 2010s, numerous small but influential anti-trans organisations were founded. Advocacy groups opposing trans rights often emphasise their support for trans individuals.

=== Opposition to proposed changes to Gender Recognition Act ===
In 2016, the House of Commons' Women and Equalities Committee issued a report recommending that the Gender Recognition Act 2004 be updated "in line with the principles of gender self-declaration". Later in 2016, in England and Wales, the government of Prime Minister Theresa May proposed revising the Act to allow for self-identification, with a public consultation on the reforms launched in 2018. A majority of respondents expressed support for the proposed reforms. In Scotland, ahead of the 2016 Scottish Parliament election, Nicola Sturgeon, the First Minister of Scotland, pledged to review and reform the way that trans people could change their legal gender. Sturgeon's government held two consultations on how to reform the Gender Recognition Act, one in 2018 and one in 2019.

The 2016 report by the Women and Equalities Committee caused advocacy groups such as Woman's Place UK and Fair Play for Women to form in opposition to the proposals. In Scotland, similar groups such as Women and Girls in Scotland, For Women Scotland and Women's Spaces formed during this period. These groups began to campaign on social media, saying the reforms would degrade or damage women's rights. (Note: Anne Maria Holli described the groups as a "women's cooperative constellation", (a term referring to a "network of actors from the organisations of the state, civil society, and universities and consultancies") that directly opposed the plans of the Sturgeon government.) Groups of gender critical people also gathered within political parties, including Labour Women's Declaration, Liberal Voice for Women and SNP Women's Pledge. In 2019, Women's Declaration International (initially formed as the Women's Human Rights Campaign) was co-founded by gender-critical feminist Sheila Jeffreys and Heather Brunskell-Evans to respond to the inquiry into the Gender Recognition Act. The organisation published the Declaration on Women's Sex-Based Rights, which said that recognising trans women as women "constitutes discrimination against women" and called for the "elimination" of gender recognition laws. Organisations that supported the Women's Human Rights Campaign include LGB Alliance, Transgender Trend, Labour Women's Declaration, WoLF (Women's Liberation Front), Standing for Women, Safe Schools Alliance UK, OBJECT (which wants to make gender-affirming healthcare illegal for anyone under the age of 25) and For Women Scotland.

=== Opposition to Stonewall pivot to transgender issues ===
The stance of LGBTQ rights charity Stonewall on transgender issues also became a point of contention for the gender-critical movement. In 2015, Stonewall began actively campaigning for transgender equality, with its then-leader Ruth Hunt issuing an apology for the organisation's prior lack of advocacy on trans issues. In 2019, the LGB Alliance was established in opposition to Stonewall's support for trans rights. It said Stonewall was "undermining women's sex-based rights and protections" and "introducing confusion between biological sex and the notion of gender". Sociologist Craig McLean describes the LGB Alliance as part of the "anti-transgender movement in the United Kingdom". The LGB Alliance has said it is "not anti-trans".

=== Opposition to gender-affirming care for young people ===
Founded in 2019, the Bayswater Support Group is a part of the gender-critical movement that describes itself as a support group for parents skeptical about their children's transgender identities. The group has influenced policies that have rolled back transgender rights, including removing protections for transgender victims of domestic abuse. In 2021, Genspect was founded with close ties to the American lobby group The Society for Evidence-Based Gender Medicine. Both organisations have been designated as anti-LGBTQ hate groups by the Southern Poverty Law Center. Their activities have focused primarily on lobbying within politics and the medical field against access to gender-affirming care. Genspect also opposes social and medical transition for transgender people.

== Media involvement ==
Since the late 2010s, British media outlets across the political spectrum have published articles that frame transgender rights as directly conflicting with the rights of women and children. One such article is an editorial published in The Guardian in 2018, arguing that there are collisions between trans rights and women's rights, followed two weeks later by a rebuttal by Guardian US journalists who said the editorial promoted transphobic viewpoints.

According to criminology and queer theory professor Sarah Lamble of Birkbeck College, gender-critical campaigners across the political spectrum describe transgender rights as directly conflicting with the safety of women and children, and these views have been "amplified by news and social media". Sandra Duffy, lecturer in law at the University of Bristol, described these developments as a moral panic similar to the one leading to the enactment of Section 28 in 1988. According to political economist Lisa Tilley of the University of London, the British media created an environment where "male violence is also displaced from the real culprits onto vulnerable transgender people, who are demonized collectively as abusers, rather than more accurately represented as victims and survivors of abuse".

Transgender activist Christine Burns said that The Times and The Sunday Times newspapers published six trans-related articles in 2016, over 150 in 2017, and similarly high numbers in subsequent years, portraying trans people as dangerous and censorious. Other media outlets, including The Guardian and the BBC, also contributed to this trend. In December 2020, the Independent Press Standards Organisation reported a 414% increase in the average number of UK media stories about trans rights, rising from 34 per month in May 2014 to 176 per month in May 2019, with an additional rise to 224 stories per month in the year prior to the report. According to the report, language had become more "respectful" over this period, although coverage of debate on Gender Recognition Act reform had become "heated" and "strident".

A 2019 study by Paul Baker, a professor at Lancaster University, found that over 6,000 articles were written in the UK press about trans people from 2018 to 2019, with many being written "in order to be critical of trans people" and cast "trans people as unreasonable and aggressive".

Trans activists have accused the British media of "stoking anti-trans sentiments". A prominent example was a 2021 BBC article titled "We're being pressured into sex by some trans women", which cited a social media poll from an anti-trans activist group to claim that cisgender lesbians were being coerced into sexual activity with transgender women under threat of being labeled transphobic. The article included statements from the LGB Alliance and an individual who, shortly after the article's publication, called for the execution of all trans women. No statements from trans individuals were included in the article.

=== Amnesty International report ===
In May 2026, Amnesty International published a report detailing the actions of four media outlets — The Guardian, The Times, The Daily Telegraph, and The Sun — designed to manufacture the British anti-trans movement via a years long campaign of overwhelming and sustained press coverage designed to exclude transgender voices, magnify the voices of anti-trans groups and figures, and more widely frame transgender people as "involved in controversy, demanding or aggressive and with a propensity to be offended". This included writing 16,913 articles between January 2020 and April 2025, roughly nine articles a day.

In July 2026, the organization published a briefing that mapped what it described as 'anti-rights' groups in the UK, which included a number of gender-critical organizations including For Women Scotland, Sex Matters, Beira's Place, and the LGB Alliance. Following immediate legal threats from these groups, with an offer from JK Rowling to financially back those who wished to sue, Amnesty withdrew the report, on 13 July, and subsequently stated that the report's "use of language does not reflect the position of Amnesty International UK". Shortly thereafter, Beira's Place, a charity founded by Rowling, threatened to sue Amnesty unless it apologised and commissioned an external investigation into the report's publication. On 16 July, Amnesty submitted a serious incident report about itself to the Charity Commission for England and Wales. On 23 July, the Charity Commission opened a regulatory compliance investigation into Amnesty over the report. Amnesty subsequently retracted the media report and apologised to Beira's Place and other groups they characterised as gender critical, saying they should not have characterised them collectively as anti-rights.

== Policy changes ==
Changes in policy regarding trans rights and associated views have covered a vast range of topics.

=== Legal status of gender-critical beliefs ===
In 2021, Forstater v Centre for Global Development Europe established that gender-critical beliefs are protected under the Equality Act 2010, but that this explicitly did not permit holders of these beliefs to discriminate against transgender individuals. The case arose when Maya Forstater sued her employer, the Centre for Global Development Europe, after her contract was not renewed after she expressed gender-critical beliefs. In April 2021, the British Equality and Human Rights Commission (EHRC) submitted evidence supporting Forstater in the case stating, "We think that a 'gender critical' belief that 'trans women are men and trans men are women' is a philosophical belief which is protected under the Equality Act."

=== Gender recognition ===
In the late 2010s, several groups were formed in response to the proposed reforms to the Gender Recognition Act, including Fair Play for Women, For Women Scotland, and Woman's Place UK. In January 2022, the Equality and Human Rights Commission (EHRC) issued statements opposing the removal of administrative barriers for transgender people to obtain legal recognition in Scotland and recommending that the ban on conversion therapy in England and Wales exclude therapies aimed at transgender individuals.

In February 2022, Vice News reported on leaked sections of an unpublished 2021 EHRC guidance document advising businesses and organizations to exclude transgender individuals from single-sex spaces—such as toilets, hospital wards, and changing rooms—unless they possessed a Gender Recognition Certificate (GRC). According to the report, the guidance, intended for release in January 2022 but unpublished as of February, was framed as protecting women. It also noted that 1% of transgender people in the UK held a GRC.

In June 2022, the EHRC stated that transgender people could be excluded from single-sex spaces as long as it serves a legitimate aim, such as "privacy, decency, to prevent trauma or to ensure health and safety". In July 2024, the EHRC issued further guidance clarifying that sex-based occupational requirements included sex as defined by a GRC but that, under Schedule 9 of the Equality Act 2010, employers were allowed to exclude transgender individuals, including those with a GRC, from roles with sex-based occupational restrictions. The guidance emphasised that the basis and justification for any such restrictions must be clearly stated in job advertisements.

In April 2025, the Supreme Court ruled in For Women Scotland Ltd v The Scottish Ministers that the definitions of "sex", "man", and "woman" in the Equality Act 2010 were meant to refer to biological sex, thus excluding people who hold a GRC from these definitions. The court said that trans people could still bring sex discrimination cases "not only against discrimination through the protected characteristic of gender reassignment, but also against direct discrimination, indirect discrimination and harassment in substance in their acquired gender". Shortly thereafter, the EHRC issued guidance in which they declared trans women to be "biological men" and trans men to be "biological women", and that they must be excluded from gender-segregated spaces accordingly. The guidance applies to any school, workplace, sporting body, publicly accessible service (such as restaurants, shops, hospitals, or shelters), and any association of 25 people or more. The guidance stated that while trans women and trans men must be barred from the women's and men's facilities, respectively, they could also be barred from the men's and women's as well, so long as there is at least one facility available for them to use. However, the guidance also stated that if only mixed-sex facilities were available, this could constitute discrimination against women, and that the presence of segregated spaces was compulsory in the workplace. The guidance also stated that women-only and lesbian-only groups must bar trans women from entry.

=== Healthcare restrictions ===
==== Bell v Tavistock ====
In 2020, the High Court ruled in a case championed by a number of anti-trans groups and figures that transgender patients under the age of 16 could not receive puberty blockers to prevent the development of unwanted secondary sex characteristics. This decision led to the withdrawal of care for many patients, resulting in some undergoing the puberty of their assigned gender at birth. According to a clinician speaking to iNews, this decision has led to many patients over the age of 16 having their gender-related healthcare withdrawn, even when it did not involve puberty blockers. In late 2021, the ruling was overturned on appeal, allowing puberty-suppressing treatment to resume.

==== Cass Review ====
In April 2024, the Cass Review into NHS England's youth gender services published its final report. The review's recommendations were largely welcomed by the British medical community. However, numerous international academics and medical organisations criticised the review's methodology and findings. The World Professional Association for Transgender Health criticised the review's methodology and evidence base, stating that it "deprives young trans and gender diverse people of the high-quality care they deserve".

The review received widespread support from UK politicians and political parties, as well as gender-critical groups such as Sex Matters, Transgender Trend, and Woman's Place UK. Julie Bindel said the review "vindicated" people with gender critical views. The review's findings led to bans on the use of puberty blockers for transgender children, both within the NHS and in private healthcare. Wes Streeting, Hilary Cass, and the Commission on Human Medicines said a lack of evidence and concerns over safety were the reasons for the ban. This position was disputed by several international medical organisations, including the American Academy of Pediatrics, the Canadian Paediatric Society, the Endocrine Society, and the Japanese Society of Psychiatry and Neurology; along with a collaboration of the German, Swiss, and Austrian medical communities led by the Association of the Scientific Medical Societies in Germany. Many GPs also began withdrawing hormone treatment from adult trans patients, citing the Cass Review—despite the review only applying to youth services.

=== Conversion therapy ===
In 2015, health organizations across the UK signed the Memorandum of Understanding on Conversion Therapy (MoU), a statement opposing conversion therapy for lesbian, gay, and bisexual individuals. In 2017, the MoU was updated to include opposition to conversion therapy for transgender individuals. In 2022, the Conservative government under Boris Johnson reversed plans to include conversion therapy targeting gender identity in a proposed ban on the practice. This decision followed lobbying by gender-critical groups and drew condemnation from the coalition behind the MoU, which published an open letter criticising the government's decision. In response to the backlash, the government cancelled its first LGBTQ conference after members withdrew in protest. The gender-critical group Transgender Trend criticised the coalition's letter, referencing the interim findings of the Cass Review.

The Cass Review's interim report said that affirmative approaches were not neutral, and that some professionals were scared to take "an exploratory approach or challenging approach" due to perceived pressures from organisations taking an "ideological stance". It suggested there was "a fear of being labelled transphobic" if professionals tried to explore or investigate the causes of gender non-conformity in children. In 2024, Hilary Cass, who chaired the review, told Kemi Badenoch that the proposed conversion therapy ban was risky and told The Guardian that she'd been "really clear with the government that any legislation would have to take inordinate care to not make workforce problems worse than they are".

In 2022, the World Professional Association for Transgender Health (WPATH) and regional transgender health bodies released a statement in response to NHS England's interim service specifications, which followed the Cass Review's interim report. The statement said:

This document seems to view gender incongruence largely as a mental health disorder or a state of confusion and withholds gender-affirming treatments on this basis. WPATH, ASIAPATH, EPATH, PATHA, and USPATH call attention to the fact that this "psychotherapeutic" approach, which was used for decades before being superseded by evidence-based gender-affirming care, has not been shown to be effective (AUSPATH, 2021; Coleman et al., 2022). Indeed, the denial of gender-affirming treatment under the guise of "exploratory therapy" has caused enormous harm to the transgender and gender diverse community and is tantamount to "conversion" or "reparative" therapy under another name.

The Professional Association for Transgender Health Aotearoa (PATHA), a New Zealand professional organisation, said the Cass Review made "harmful recommendations" and was not in line with international consensus. It said: "Restricting access to social transition is restricting gender expression, a natural part of human diversity." PATHA further said that several people involved in the review "previously advocated for bans on gender-affirming care in the United States, and have promoted non-affirming 'gender exploratory therapy', which is considered a conversion practice".

In 2022, an NHS conference on gender dysphoria was cancelled following complaints by NHS whistleblowers, researchers, and trans rights activists, who accused a majority of the speakers as having a "record of extreme prejudice towards trans people". openDemocracy said the speakers had "close links to proponents of anti-trans conversion therapies".

In November 2023, the UK Council for Psychotherapy (UKCP) issued a statement on gender-critical views, asserting that practitioners holding such views might favor conversion therapy over gender-affirming care, particularly for children and young adults with gender dysphoria. In April 2024, the UKCP withdrew from the MoU and the Coalition Against Conversion Therapy, saying it did not want to oppose conversion therapy for young trans people. This decision was criticised by other MoU signatories and over 1,500 UKCP members.

=== Education ===
In December 2021, the Girls' Day School Trust, the largest network of girls' private schools in the UK, issued a blanket ban on trans girls being admitted to any of its schools. In August 2022, Attorney-General Suella Braverman stated that it is lawful for schools to misgender, deadname, and exclude transgender students from certain sports; to deny enrolment based on their transgender status; and to refuse any form of gender affirmation. She further said that recognising transgender identities could be considered "indoctrinating children".

In March 2025, University of Sussex was fined £585,000 by the Office for Students (OfS) in relation to its transgender and nonbinary equality policy, over the resignation of Kathleen Stock. The Office for Students stated that the policy created a "chilling effect" and "placed constraints on freedom of speech and academic freedom".

The university's policy stated curricula should avoid "stereotypical assumptions about trans people", forbade "transphobic abuse, harassment or bullying", that course materials should "positively represent trans people and trans lives", and that "transphobic propaganda [would] not be tolerated". The university challenged the ruling with a judicial review. Sasha Roseneil, the university's vice-chancellor, claimed the investigation had been politically motivated, warning of dire implications for higher education, as potential fines were so large. In April 2026, the High Court overturned the judgement, finding that, among other criticisms, that "the OfS had misdirected itself on the question of what amounted to a break of academic freedom", and that "the OfS approached the decision with a closed mind and therefore unlawfully predetermined the decision".

In July 2025, new education guidance was implemented regarding the teaching of transgender topics in schools in England mandating that students must carefully be taught a person's rights held on the basis of "biological sex" and how the rights of a trans person of a particular gender differ from the rights of someone assigned that gender at birth. Additionally, schools are forbidden from encouraging children to question their gender, or from teaching that everyone has a gender identity; and must not advocate for social transition as a "simple solution".

=== Sport ===
Restrictions on participation in sport have been a significant focus of the anti-trans movement in the UK. In September 2021, the UK Sports Council Equality Group issued guidance asserting that, in their view, transgender inclusion and "competitive fairness" cannot coexist in sport. The SCEG based its guidance on 300 interviews regarding personal opinions on the matter, conducted across 54 sports and 175 organisations. 20 of those interviewed were trans people.

In June 2022, Nadine Dorries, the UK Secretary of State for Digital, Culture, Media and Sport at the time, met with the heads of UK sporting bodies and stated that "elite and competitive women's sport must be reserved for people born of the female sex". Since then, transgender women have been banned from competing in women's sports across various disciplines, including cycling and fishing.

=== Rape law ===
Under 2024 guidance published by the Crown Prosecution Service, trans people in England and Wales who fail to disclose their transgender status to a sexual partner, whether deliberately or not, can be charged with rape. On 10 October 2025, a transgender woman in England who claimed to be on her period to avoid revealing her transgender status to a male heterosexual partner, was sentenced to 21 months in prison for sexual assault.

=== Prisons ===
As of 2023, trans women imprisoned in England and Wales are to be housed in men's prisons if they have committed any violent or sexual crime, and/or if they have male genitalia.

In Scotland, guidance drawn up in 2014 allowed all prisoners to be placed in facilities that matched their gender identity rather than their sex at birth. Following the Isla Bryson case, guidance was updated in 2023 to say that no newly convicted or remanded transgender prisoner who had previously committed violence against a woman, or who was considered a risk to women and girls, would be housed in female prison facilities. In 2026, in response to a Judicial Review brought by For Women Scotland, Lady Ross ruled that Scottish Prison Service guidance allowing transgender prisoners to be held in jails opposite their sex at birth was unlawful based on the 2025 Supreme Court ruling on the definition of a woman in equality law.

== International responses ==
In 2021, the Council of Europe's Committee on Equality and Non-Discrimination issued a warning regarding the United Kingdom, stating that:

ongoing social, political and legal debate [in the United Kingdom (UK)] about what constitutes harmful discourse when it comes to trans people and their rights, and arguments defending freedom of expression have been – and are still being – used as a tool to justify transphobic rhetoric, further penalising and harming already marginalised trans people and communities.

The committee concluded that the "'gender-critical' movement, which wrongly portrays trans rights as posing a particular threat to cisgender women and girls, has played a significant role in this process".

In May 2023, a United Nations investigation found that the British Equality and Human Rights Commission had intentionally acted to reduce human rights protections for transgender individuals with legal gender recognition, and that rhetoric by both the British media and politicians had created a climate of hostility against trans people in the UK.

=== Impact abroad ===
==== Canada ====
The British Cass Review was cited as justification for Alberta's anti-trans legislation, including a ban on gender-affirming healthcare for young people.

==== United States ====
The Republican Party in the 2020s has extensively cited British anti-trans measures as justification to implement their own in the United States, both at the state and the federal level, as well as in court.

==== Sweden ====
In March 2021, the Karolinska University Hospital in Sweden announced, citing the UK court decision in Bell v. Tavistock, that it would no longer prescribe puberty blockers to patients under 16, and would only allow patients between the ages of 16 and 18 to access gender affirming care as part of an approved clinical trial.

==== New Zealand ====
On 19 November 2025, the Ministry of Health under the right-wing New Zealand First and ACT party coalition and led by Simeon Brown, announced a ban on puberty blockers for minors with gender dysphoria set to take effect on 19 December 2025, but was delayed pending judicial review. Minors with gender dysphoria already on puberty blockers would be able to continue them and the drug will remained available for other uses like early onset puberty. Brown cited the Cass Review in his decision and said the ban would remain in place until the completion of the United Kingdom's clinical trial on puberty blockers. The ban was strongly condemned by the Royal Australian and New Zealand College of Psychiatrists (RANZCP), the Professional Association for Transgender Health Aotearoa (PATHA) and multiple other doctors in New Zealand. The ban was also condemned by the opposition centre-left Labour Party as well as members of the Green Party.

== Analysis ==
Surveying by YouGov in 2024 and 2025 found that inline with an increase in the anti-gender movement, there has been a decrease in support of transgender people observed in polling since 2020. Such surveying also found that in late 2025, 24% of trans adults reported being subjected to physical violence in public spaces, 65% reported receiving verbal abuse in public spaces, and 84% reported feeling unsafe in the United Kingdom.

=== Academic ===
Criminologist Sarah Lamble of Birkbeck, University of London writes that gender-critical activists from across the political spectrum, whether feminist or conservative, routinely argue that the rights of transgender people and "gender ideology" threaten the safety of cisgender women and children; such messages have been amplified by news reporting and social media, fuelling the rise of the gender-critical movement. Lamble, alongside researcher Claire House, and sociologist Sally Hines show that a reinforcing partnership between anti-transgender feminists and right-wing and far-right actors has formed since the 2010s, which has mobilised a core of activists to roll back rights and protections granted to transgender people in the UK.

Sociologist Craig McLean of Northumbria University writes that the British anti-trans movement has been shaped by the influence of a small core of lobby groups that "have used their influence in the media to push with impunity a narrative that transwomen are not safe and should not be allowed to use female facilities. They have pushed a narrative of 'raising reasonable concerns' and just 'asking questions', but the reality is that they have helped to demonize an already vulnerable minority." He further details how they have sought to radicalise the broader electorate against transgender people. Sociologist Sone Erikainen of the University of Aberdeen has argued that gender-critical feminists are a vocal minority but do not represent British feminism as a whole; despite claims that gender-critical feminists have been silenced by the "trans lobby", their views have appeared in the media "sometimes more than the views of trans-affirming feminists and trans activists, and their arguments have also carried a lot of impact on policy decisions".

Sociologists McLean and Stretesky argue that "a veritable miasma of anti-trans campaign groups [...] united in their antipathy toward transgender people" has contributed to an anti-trans moral panic in the United Kingdom, which they link to authoritarian beliefs. They identify anti-trans groups such as CitizenGO, FiLiA, Fair Play for Women, Get the L Out, LGB Alliance, Sex Matters, and Transgender Trend.

Leah Owen, a lecturer in politics and international relations at Swansea University, argued in a 2022 article that anti-transgender ideologies rely on "discourses of 'toxification'", in which groups of people are compared to pathogens or threats and their removal from society is necessitated, to statements from Popes Benedict XVI and Francis, Janice Raymond, Abigail Shrier, and Helen Joyce, arguing that regardless of agreement on other issues, anti-transgender activists consistently seek to reduce or eliminate transgender people's public presence. Owen further highlights how arguments and rhetoric from more mainstream anti-Transgender figures and groups are taken up by far-right groups (particularly in the US) in their attempts at the time of writing that sought to eradicate transgender people through "broader cultural/legal/social action" rather than direct extermination.James Pickles and Ben Colliver argue that self-styled "gender critical" actors in the United Kingdom contribute to a wider social environment in which transphobic prejudice is normalised, shaping public attitudes and enabling increased hate-crime perpetration and structural harms against trans communities.

Academics from the University of Glasgow and University of Edinburgh have identified growing trans exclusionary research practices and approaches to research ethics in the collection of sex and gender data, including through the proposals of the Independent review of data, statistics and research on sex and gender commissioned by the Conservative Party and led by sociologist Alice Sullivan.

== See also ==
- 2020s anti-LGBTQ movement in the United States
- Anti-gender movement in Sweden
- Trans-exclusionary radical feminism § United Kingdom
- LGBTQ rights opposition in the United Kingdom
- Party of Women
- Transgender genocide
