= Taylor v Jaguar Land Rover Ltd =

British court case

- Court: Employment tribunal
- Full case name: Ms R Taylor v Jaguar Land Rover Ltd
- Decided: 14 September 2020

Taylor v Jaguar Land Rover Ltd was a UK employment tribunal court case in 2020 that ruled that non-binary gender and genderfluid identities fall under the protected characteristic of gender reassignment in the Equality Act 2010.

== Background ==
Section 7 of the Equality Act 2010 lists the protected characteristic of gender reassignment:

1) A person has the protected characteristic of gender reassignment if the person is proposing to undergo, is undergoing or has undergone a process (or part of a process) for the purpose of reassigning the person's sex by changing physiological or other attributes of sex.
2) A reference to a transsexual person is a reference to a person who has the protected characteristic of gender reassignment.

== Case ==
In 2017, Rose Taylor, an engineer at Jaguar Land Rover, publicly came out as genderfluid. Following her coming-out, she began facing harassment at her workplace, including discriminatory comments and issues accessing toilet facilities and managerial support. In August 2017, she raised a complaint with her workplace HR after two of her colleagues referred to her as "it," but was told by HR "well what else would you want them to call you?"

In 2018, she resigned from Jaguar and announced her intention to sue the company in a discrimination action. The company, however, argued that her identity as genderfluid did not fall under the Equality Act protected characteristic of gender reassignment. As part of the ruling, the tribunal found that:

It was very clear that Parliament intended gender reassignment to be a spectrum moving away from birth sex, and that a person could be at any point on that spectrum... it was beyond any doubt that somebody in the situation of the Claimant was (and is) protected by the legislation because they are on that spectrum and they are on a journey which will not be the same in any two cases.

On 14 September 2020, the tribunal ruled in Taylor's favour, finding that genderfluid identities fell under the protected characteristic of gender reassignment and that she had been discriminated against on the basis of being genderfluid.

The tribunal also ruled that the company had failed to follow the Acas Code of Practice in regards to measures to help Taylor in the workplace in her transition and subsequently increased the damages compensation due by 20%. On 2 October 2020, the judge awarded Taylor £180,000 in damages. Jaguar additionally issued a formal apology to Taylor over the discrimination.

== Reactions ==
LBGT+ rights charity Stonewall reacted positively to the news, stating that "this ruling is a milestone moment in recognising the rights of non-binary and gender fluid people to be protected from discrimination under the Equality Act. Up until now, it’s not been clear whether non-binary people would be protected by anti-discrimination legislation."

Lawyers Adam Cooke of Stephenson Harwood and Oscar Davies of Lamb Chambers noted that Jaguar had pre-existing Equal Opportunities and Dignity at Work policies, and that the case was consequently "a prime example of how having a policy in place cannot, in and of itself, absolve an employer of liability when related grievances arise." Writing for The Law Society Gazette, Lizzie Hardy stated that "as is often the case, the law has to play catch-up to society’s movement away from seeing gender as a purely binary construct."
