= Grainger plc v Nicholson =

UK law case

- Court: Employment Appeal Tribunal
- Citation: [2010] IRLR 4 (EAT)

Case opinions
- Burton J

Keywords
- Climate change, belief

Grainger plc v Nicholson [2010] IRLR 4 (EAT) is a UK employment discrimination law case, concerning the protection of religion or belief. Regarding the question of an employee's conviction about climate change, it examines the scope of the legislation's protection.

== Facts ==
Mr Nicholson was made redundant from Grainger plc, the UK's largest listed specialist landlord. Mr Nicholson said that he had been selected for redundancy first because he believed in climate change. He argued, as a preliminary matter, that was a philosophical belief within the Employment Equality (Religion or Belief) Regulations 2003 r 2(1)(b) and should be construed in accordance with previous legal cases relating to article 9 of the European Convention on Human Rights (ECHR) (right to freedom of thought, conscience and belief) and Protocol 1, Article 2 (right to education in accordance with the philosophical beliefs of the parents of the child concerned). He said that it affected where he lived and how he travelled.

== Judgment ==
Burton J held that a conviction that climate change exists is a protected "belief". At Paragraph 24 of the judgment , he set out the five criteria for this:

1. The belief must be genuinely held.
2. It must be a belief and not an opinion or viewpoint based on the present state of information available.
3. It must be a belief as to a weighty and substantial aspect of human life and behaviour.
4. It must attain a certain level of cogency, seriousness, cohesion and importance.
5. It must be worthy of respect in a democratic society, be not incompatible with human dignity and not conflict with the fundamental rights of others.

The final requirements (democratic respectability and compatibility with human dignity) exclude those beliefs that reject social pluralism or the dignity of other people. In that regard, Burton distinguished the beliefs of Darwinism and creationism and the belief that either of those beliefs should be promoted exclusively of the other.

As Eweida v British Airways plc showed, there was a duty to draw on ECHR jurisprudence.

The lower Tribunal had taken Nicholson's word that he believed as he alleged, and indicated that it would not allow an evidentiary inquiry on that matter. Although Burton upheld the Tribunal's preliminary decision as to applicable law, he directed it to permit such an inquiry before concluding that Nicholson held (or did not hold) a protected philosophical belief.

== Application in subsequent cases ==
Veganism, a belief in Scottish independence, gender critical beliefs, opposition to critical race theory with support for the attitude of Martin Luther King towards race, and anti-Zionist beliefs, have all been held to be philosophical beliefs protected under the Equality Act 2010, on the principles set out in the Grainger case.

== See also ==
- UK employment discrimination law
- Equality Act 2010
