= Transgender Trend =

British pressure group

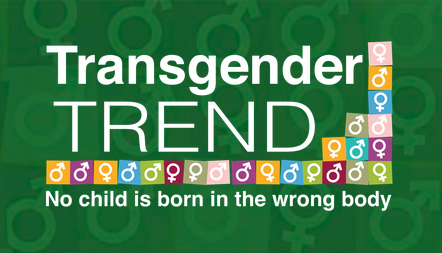
- Formation: 2015
- Founder: Stephanie Davies-Arai
- Type: British pressure group
- Region served: United Kingdom
- Website: Official website

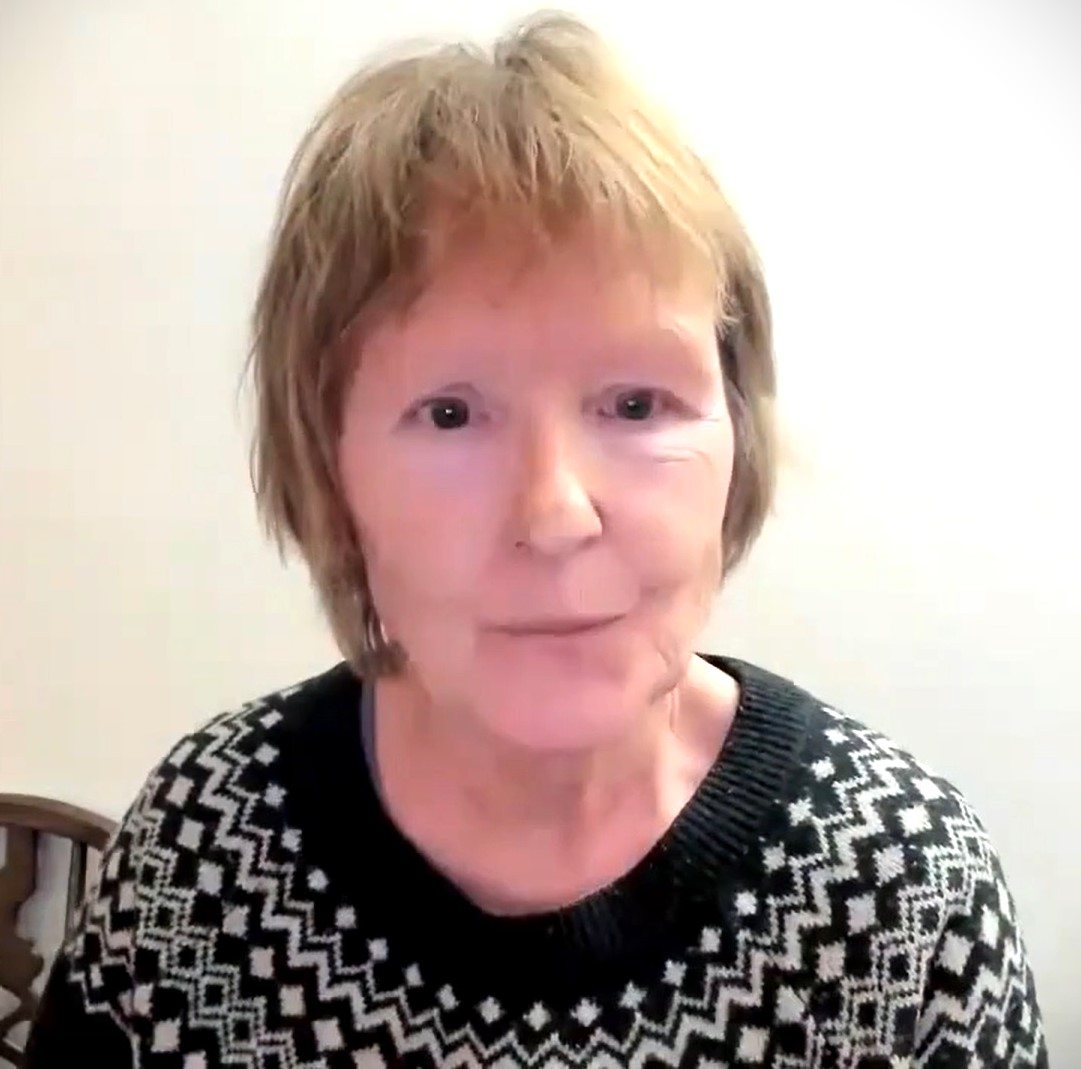
Stephanie Davies-Arai in 2024

Transgender Trend is an anti-trans British pressure group, which describes itself as a group of parents, professionals and academics who are concerned about the number of children diagnosed with gender dysphoria. It was founded in 2015 by Stephanie Davies-Arai.

== History and positions ==
=== Transgender youth ===
Transgender Trend has stated there is no "evidence that children really are trans" and claims that "gender ideology" harms children. The Association for Women's Rights in Development describes the stance as "almost identical to religious fundamentalists". Commentary on its website has warned that transgender children are being "groomed" and "brainwashed". It has also stated it believes that adults under 25 transitioning is "the next big scandal".

In September 2018, Davies-Arai told BuzzFeed News: "If the child comes out as trans I think it's really important that parents are informed". When asked about the effect of outing children she acknowledged that "some parents are abusive and bigoted", but added that "we have to assume that most parents have the best interests of their child at heart".

In 2022, an 18-year-old trans man reported Az Hakeem, a psychiatrist who describes himself as "gender-critical", to the General Medical Council for practising conversion therapy on him when he was a patient at 17. He stated that when he came out, his mother began to research and fell into "very, very anti-trans circles," and contacted Transgender Trend for advice. A representative for the organisation told her that "we share your misgivings" about his social transition. Transgender Trend had previously interviewed Hakeem, where he stated that "very black and white thinking… is characteristic of a Trans mind" and referred to the "psychopathology of the trans condition".

Davies-Arai is also a clinical advisor to Genspect, an international gender-critical non-profit organisation which advocates against transgender rights and spreads contested claims about transgender healthcare.

Truthout stated: "Groups like Transgender Trend, an organization that campaigns against LGBT-inclusive relationship and sex education to schools (and was allowed to contribute to the Keira Bell case as an expert witness), are now refocusing on targeting trans health care for anyone under 25."

=== Bell v Tavistock ===
Transgender Trend testified against the use of puberty blockers in Bell v Tavistock, a British court case on the question of whether they could be prescribed to minors. Stephanie Davies-Arai said: "Children do not have the maturity or life experience to give informed consent to medical interventions with such devastating long-term consequences."

=== School resource packs ===
Transgender Trend raised thousands in online donations to send out "school resource packs" which claim it is better not to affirm transgender children. The resource pack advises schools to "be cautious" of respecting transgender students' right to dress or be referred to by their gender, avoid giving transgender students time off for medical appointments, and to sort children by their "biological sex" in physical education. The packet also advised teachers to tell transgender students' classmates that "you can’t actually change from a boy to a girl."

The resource pack argues that gender dysphoria in children can be the result of "simple social contagion" via rapid-onset gender dysphoria. Rapid-onset gender dysphoria is not recognised by any major professional association as a valid mental health diagnosis, and according to MIT Technology Review, the study originally proposing it was "based on parent surveys recruited from explicitly anti-trans and trans-skeptical websites and forums", including Transgender Trend.

Stonewall described the guidance as "packed with factually inaccurate content". The Department of Education did not comment on the content of the guidance but confirmed they did not endorse or provide any funding to it.

=== Sticker campaign ===
Transgender Trend was criticised for publishing downloadable stickers in September 2018 stating "Kids shouldn't be taught in school that they can choose to be a boy or a girl", "Is Rapid Onset Gender Dysphoria the new anorexia?", and "Teenagers are coming out as transgender after social media binges", among others. Davies-Arai defended the stickers and stated that she had spoken to "about 10" trans people since Transgender Trend's launch in 2015.

BuzzFeed News stated that "Davies-Arai is not qualified in medicine, law, or teaching, and does not have professional experience working with trans people." Stonewall argued that the sticker campaign "contributes to an environment where the bullying of trans students can flourish". Susie Green, CEO of Mermaids, stated: "If used in school they send a clear message to transgender students that their identity is not valid." BuzzFeed News described them as distributing "anti-trans propaganda to schools as a neutral-sounding 'resource pack,' in a similar style to crisis pregnancy centers duping women seeking abortions".

=== Relationship and sex education ===
In February 2020, Davies-Arai spoke in the UK House of Commons in a parliamentary briefing arguing against Relationship and Sex Education (RSE) supportive of LGBT rights and identities that went into effect in September 2020. Davies-Arai argued that teaching gender identity would lead to abuse and adult men using girls' toilets. She appeared and argued alongside Lynda Rose, the director of an anti-abortion pressure group, who stated that "being subjected from age three to the messages that they can change their gender, if they want, and that they may be homosexual, because they have a best friend of the same sex [...] It's a social experiment, and it's abuse"; Ed Matyjaszek, who stated that "We are in danger of instituting via RSE a national grooming programme in primary schools"; and Judith Nemeth, head of the anti-LGBT Values Foundation. The briefing was organised by the Lords and Commons Family and Child Protection Group which had supported Section 28, legislature that banned schools from "promoting homosexuality". The House of Commons Trade Union, and ParliOUT, a workplace equality network for LGBT+ people in parliament, wrote a letter to the Houses of Commons and Lords opposing the event and asking if LGBT+ staff would be required to work at such events.

=== LGBT rights groups ===
The group says it is in favour of "sex-based rules where justified" and says that LGBT rights groups such as Stonewall and Mermaids promote rigid gender roles by encouraging gender non-conforming children to "believe they might be trans". The group is against prescribing puberty-blocking drugs or medical interventions to adolescents under 18, and has supported legal cases in pursuit of restricting such prescriptions or interventions.

== Reception ==
In April 2018, representatives from the University of Oxford, Oxford Brookes University, and the National Union of Students signed an open letter protesting an event that Woman's Place UK was holding which stated "A Woman's Place and groups speaking tonight, including Transgender Trend and Fair Play for Women, have been at the centre of this past year’s violent anti-transgender rhetoric and media abuse."

In June 2022, Davies-Arai spoke at the "Sex, Gender and Schools" seminar at the University of Edinburgh. The co-chairs at the University of Edinburgh Staff Pride Network said that there was "no presentation of research data provided to the audience" and that the speakers used "scaremongering tactics" to propose that teachers should "question why a child might be expressing themselves in this way" instead of affirming their gender identity.

Approximately 8,000 women signed an open letter to Liz Truss stating "We are incredibly concerned that the language you have used is very similar to the anti-trans rhetoric used by transphobic hate groups and organisations such as Woman’s Place UK, Transgender Trend and the LGB Alliance" in response to her depiction of "trans rights as a new threat to cisgender women like ourselves".

In 2022, Davies-Arai was awarded the British Empire Medal by Queen Elizabeth II, with the citation "Founder, Transgender Trend. For services to Children".

Sociologists McLean and Stretesky describe Transgender Trend as part of "a veritable miasma of anti-trans campaign groups [...] united in their antipathy toward transgender people," alongside CitizenGo, FiLiA, Fair Play for Women, Get the L Out, Keep Prisons Single Sex, Lesbian Rights Alliance, LGB Alliance, and Sex Matters.
