= FiLiA =

British gender-critical feminist charity

- Formation: September 8, 2015; 11 years ago
- Founder: Lisa-Marie Taylor and Julian Norman
- Founded at: London
- Merger of: Resist Porn Culture
- Registration no.: 1163473
- Legal status: Charity
- Chief Executive Officer: Lisa-Marie Taylor
- Revenue: £301,516 GBP (on 31 December 2022)
- Website: www.filia.org.uk
- Formerly called: Feminism in London

FiLiA is a British charity founded in 2015 that describes itself as part of the women's liberation movement. FiLiA organizes a conference, held first in 2008 as Feminism in London, in different cities, which it now describes as the "largest annual grassroots feminist conference in Europe". FiLiA is gender-critical, and states that it supports "sex-based rights" and opposes what they refer to as "gender ideology." It has lobbied against gender recognition reform and considers gender self-identification a threat to "women's protected rights." Critics describe it as anti-transgender and transphobic. FiLiA is critical of the sex industry and as a result, it considers pornography harmful. It has campaigned on behalf of women internationally, and has held campaigns in countries such as Iran, Cyprus, and Kenya. It has been described by scholars as one of "the most important 'gender critical' groups" alongside Women's Declaration International.

FiLiA has faced protests and attempted cancellations, notably in 2023 when the venue Platform attempted to cancel the conference due to alleged transphobia. In 2024 FiLiA launched the book The Women Who Wouldn't Wheesht, on what the authors describe as a campaign for "sex-based rights" by J.K. Rowling and others.

== People and formation ==
Founders Lisa-Marie Taylor and Julian Norman resolved together in 2012 to co-organise the Feminism in London conference in 2013, and afterwards led it from "a conference to a women's rights charity", registered in 2015. Taylor described attending the Feminism in London conference in 2010 as life-changing: "It made me want to join the women’s liberation movement. I never dreamed I’d be running it."

In 2016, the organisation joined with Resist Porn Culture and adopted the name FiLiA, a word meaning daughter, "evocative of our intention to steadfastly continue the work of our foremothers to create a better world for our daughters". The word was Alisa Lockwood's name for the art exhibition at Feminism in London in 2013.

Co-founder Lisa-Marie Taylor is trustee and chief executive officer. The three other trustees are Kruti Walsh, Sally Jackson, and Claire Heuchan. Co-founder Julian Norman ceased to be a trustee in 2020.

Writer Raquel Rosario Sánchez is the spokeswoman for FiLiA since 25 November 2019. Previously, its spokeswoman was Heather Brunskell-Evans, founder of both Resist Porn Culture, a precursor of FiLiA, and Women's Declaration International (WDI).

== Conferences and events ==
The volunteer team behind FiLiA has organised a feminist conference, originally known as Feminism in London, since 2013. The conference continues the Feminism in London series held in 2008, 2009, and 2010.

Feminism in London was held at the Institute of Education in 2013 and 2014.

In October 2015, more than 1000 women attended the two day weekend event at the London Hilton Metropole. Lisa-Marie Taylor said that Feminism in London was the "largest women's rights conference in the UK". Speakers included Sophie Walker, leader of the Women's Equality party, and Shami Chakrabarti, director of Liberty.

In October 2017, following a break in 2016, FiLiA's conference was held in Bloomsbury, with an art show including 70 women artists.

In October 2018, the conference took place in Salford, with over 24 sessions, with topics including women and class, women and Palestine, and women in the media.

In October 2019, FiLiA's conference, held in Bradford, aimed to "Unite women around the country in defending women's human rights and building sisterhood and solidarity". Themes included domestic abuse, sexual assault, and gender inequalities.

In October 2021, postponed by a year, FiLiA held its conference in Portsmouth. FiLiA said over 1100 people attended. Gender-critical speaker Jo Phoenix announced legal proceedings against the Open University for "the public campaign of harassment that has made my working life unbearable". The winner of the Emma Humphrey prize for contributing towards ending male violence was announced: a 45-year-old woman, referred to as Daisy, who had been conceived by rape and had led a campaign for nine years resulting in the conviction of her father.

In October 2022, FiLiA's annual conference took place in Cardiff. FiLiA described it as the "largest annual grassroots feminist conference in Europe". Police investigated online threats against the venue. Many businesses in Cardiff responded by flying the trans flag to condemn the FiLiA event. One of the speakers was Nazanin Zaghari-Ratcliffe. In 2021, FiLiA had organised a global fast, by groups of women in the UK, India, Morocco and Iran, in support of her release from imprisonment in Iran.

In October 2023, the FiLiA conference took place at Platform in Glasgow city centre. FiLiA said that 1400 delegates attended. Among 150 speakers were SNP MP Joanna Cherry, writers Julie Bindel and J. K. Rowling, and United Nations Special Rapporteur on violence against women and girls Reem Alsalem. Topics discussed included legal rights of women and the risk they face from gender self-identification. Following claims by activists that FiLiA is a transphobic group, Platform gave FiLiA 12 hours' notice that their conference would not be allowed to be held at the venue. The venue's cancellation resulted in legal threats, describing the legal implications of the Equality Act 2010, following which the cancellation was withdrawn. Glasgow LGBT rights activists, intersectional feminists and Scottish Greens politicians staged a public protest against FiLiA on 13 October 2023. The Scotsman newspaper reported "Anonymous organisers behind the Glasgow Trans Rally had attempted to shut down the three-day FiLiA conference, which features people from around the world to discuss topics including female genital mutilation." Glasgow Scottish Green councillor Holly Bruce said "there’s various workshops and sessions that are under the guise of women’s safety, that are trans exclusionary."

At the 2025 FiLiA conference in Brighton, speakers and materials accused of promoting antisemitic views led to walkouts and public criticism from attendees. Jewish participants said they were targeted or made to feel unwelcome. The distribution of a pamphlet containing antisemitic language, the platforming of a speaker who wrote that "I love Hamas," and a later violent confrontation at a conference party, during which drinks were thrown and delegates were ejected, prompted further condemnation and demands for an apology for antisemitism. Freya Papworth, a former FiLiA volunteer, said she and many others were "deeply concerned about the dissemination of disgustingly antisemitic material at the FiLiA conference." On 10 October 2025, activists from the transgender rights group BASH BACK carried out a protest at the Brighton Centre, where the conference was being held, involving spray-painted slogans and broken windows. The group described the action as a response to what they called "some of the most vicious transphobia in pop politics" associated with the event. FiLiA said they were shocked and saddened by the response to a conference "for women to discuss domestic abuse, sexual violence and lesbian safety" and that they were expecting more than 2,400 people to attend. Sussex Police initiated an investigation into the incident. Local protesters said "our city is being invaded by transphobes." Siân Berry, the local member of parliament, condemned FiLiA for "inflaming division" and said Brighton and Hove City Council "needs better policies for which events it will host in our council-owned venues," and that "the choice of Brighton was clearly provocative from organisers." Berry also indicated she had raised the FiLiA conference with the Council several months earlier after learning about the decision to rent the venue to the group.

== Positions ==
Writing in The Critic in August 2022, Raquel Rosario Sánchez described FiLiA as a "wide-ranging feminist organisation, rather than a single-issue one". She listed international links with women's campaigns in the US, Nepal, Afghanistan, Iran, Tigray, and Rojava.

In November 2018, FiLiA tweeted a picture of a shop window display at Marks & Spencer in Nottingham that juxtaposed women's "must-have fancy little knickers" with men's "must-have outfits to impress". FiLiA challenged the retailer to reverse the images, and said M&S was "ignoring the wider issues and their contribution to maintaining sexist stereotypes".

=== LGBT community ===
FiLiA has opposed changes to the Gender Recognition Act 2004. Sociologist Madeleine Pape noted that FiLiA had linked the proposed reforms to “a nebulous concept of internal gender identity” and so-called "gender ideology", which Pape described as "language that bears a striking resemblance to the wider anti-gender movement."

In 2018, barrister Julian Norman, chair of FiLiA, contributed to a legal discussion in The Guardian during the public consultation on reform of the Gender Recognition Act 2004. Norman called for the law to protect everyone on the "transgender spectrum", while also ensuring that providers can "choose whether to provide single-sex or single-gender services", and that funding ensures at least some remain single-sex. In her 2021 book Trans, author Helen Joyce writes that FiLiA affirmed the stance of Woman's Place UK: "agnostic on whether governments should recognise gender identities, but firm on the need for female-only spaces". Joyce quotes Lisa-Marie Taylor: "While we're forced to defend the legal definition of woman, women are still being raped and battered. Female genital mutilation continues."

The Morning Star reported that FiLiA asked the UN High Commission for Refugees in 2020 to prevent violence against lesbians in the Kakuma refugee camp in Kenya and in 2021 to help following an arson attack on lesbians at the camp. Sally Jackson of FiLiA said: "What’s happening to these women — and their gay and transgender neighbours in the camp — is horrific and heartbreaking. Shockingly the authorities that should be protecting them, health, police and the UNHCR, are turning their backs on them when they are in their greatest need."

In April 2021, Raquel Rosario Sánchez represented FiLiA to the Women and Equalities Select Committee on potential reform of the Gender Recognition Act 2004, alongside Nicola Williams of Fair Play for Women and Judith Green of Woman's Place UK.

In 2021 FiLiA expressed support for Sall Grover, who has developed an app criticized as "anti-trans".

In 2022, the trustees expressed FiLiA's support for "sex-based rights" and said: "There exist some situations in which women need access to female-only spaces: in refuges, in recovery from male violence, in shared accommodation, sports, and of course in the right of our lesbian sisters to determine their own sexual orientation."

=== Pornography ===
In 2020, the Morning Star reported that FiLiA urged the UK government to assist a British woman allegedly raped in Cyprus, and to use the case as an opportunity to address the harmful effects of pornography on society and public health.

=== Prostitution ===
In 2015, a position statement by the conference said that: "We are critical of the sex industry. By this we do not mean that we disapprove of the women involved in it. We are critical of the hypercapitalist and patriarchal industry itself." There was anger that sex workers and pro-prostitution voices were not included in the conference. Following complaints about her stance on prostitution, journalist Jane Fae withdrew from speaking, and, in consequence, so did journalists Julie Bindel and Caroline Criado-Perez.

== Reception ==
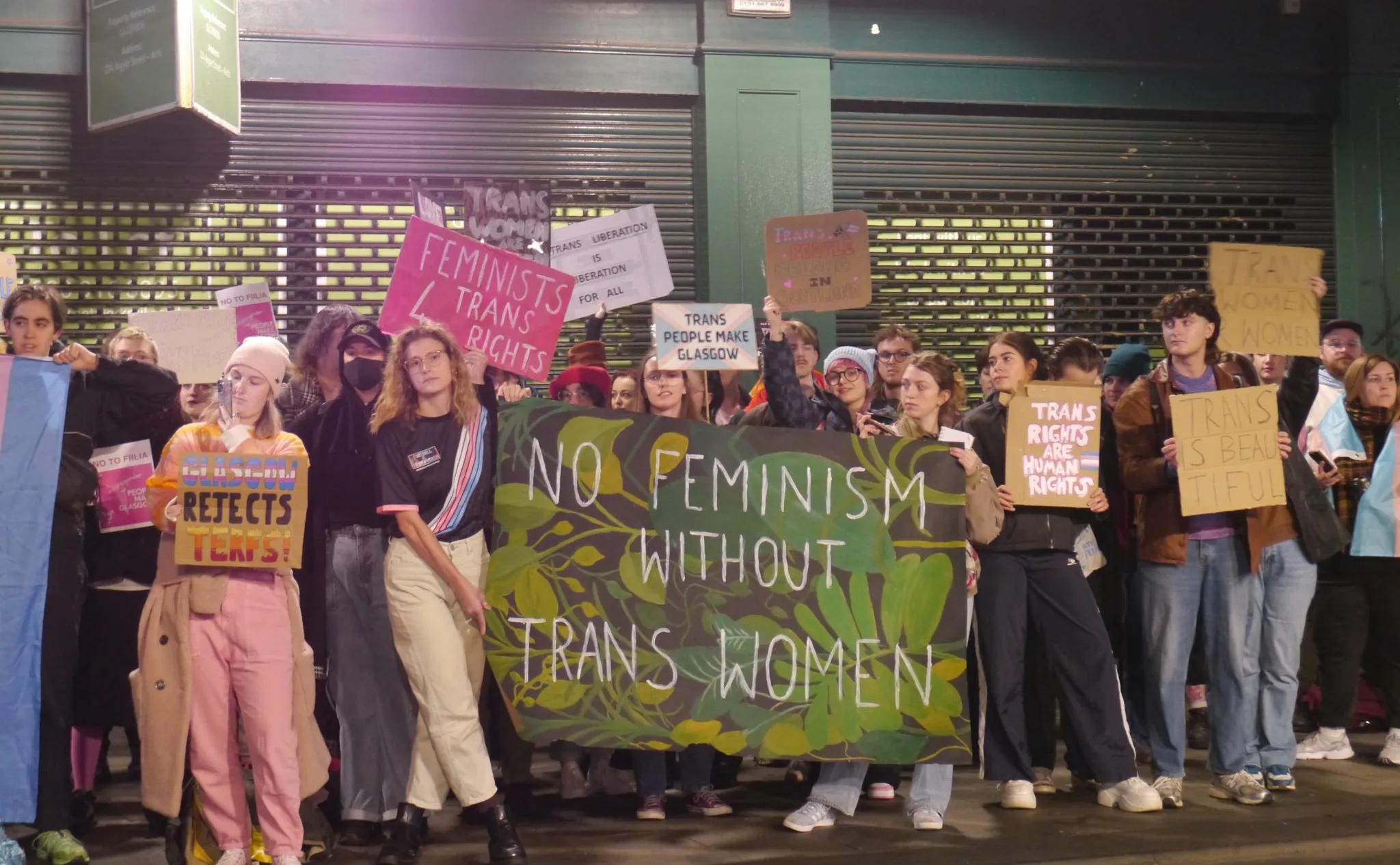
Protest against FiLiA in Glasgow, 2023, with slogans including "No feminism without trans women" and "Glasgow rejects TERFs"

Sociologists McLean and Stretesky describe FiLiA as part of "a veritable miasma of anti-trans campaign groups ... united in their antipathy toward transgender people," alongside CitizenGo, Fair Play for Women, Get the L Out, LGB Alliance, Sex Matters, and Transgender Trend. Beck and co-authors describe FiLiA as one of "the most important 'gender critical' groups" alongside Women's Declaration International, Fair Play for Women, Women's Place UK, Re-sisters, and Sex Matters.

FiLiA has faced accusations of transphobia and protests against its events.

In 2020 cosmetics company Lush apologised for donating money to FiLiA and Woman's Place UK, after the company had faced extensive criticism, e.g. from the leader of Young Labour, Jessica Barnard, who said it was "disgusting to see Lush funding transphobia." FiLiA was described by The Daily Dot as "openly transphobic" and "opposing the idea that you can even be trans".

In 2021, a member of Portsmouth City Council described FiLiA as "transphobic", and the council flew trans flags outside its offices, ahead of the Portsmouth conference.

In 2022, the Trans Safety Network described the Cardiff FiLiA conference as characterised by "a disturbing trend of anti-trans extremism, conspiracy theory and harassment of trans and GNC people" and said that "much of the content on their website indicates a hostility to trans women [and] conspiratorial beliefs."

In 2023, a statement posted on the Instagram profile of the anonymous Glasgow Trans Rally group said the conference was "dangerously transphobic," "encourages an environment which materially endangers trans folk, especially trans women" and that "the way that FiLiA’s transphobia operates is insidious. They deliberately veil their transphobia behind ‘feminist’ rhetoric in a way that is calculated, tactical and deceitful." Writer Jean Hatchet responded to this criticism in The Critic: "These are women who have often worked their entire lives to ensure the freedom and safety of other women. They have worked in war zones, survived male violence, endured the horrors of prostitution and trafficking, escaped the Taliban, been forcibly married, and suffered FGM".

In March 2024, Plaid Cymru barred FiLiA's stall from the party's Spring conference in Caernarfon. FiLiA was informed that its views were "potentially contrary to the party's values". CEO Lisa-Marie Taylor said FiLiA's volunteers were "surprised and disappointed" and questioned the reasons for the exclusion. In September 2024, Plaid Cymru admitted that canceling FiLiA's booking "amounted to an act of discrimination under the [Equality Act 2010]."
