= Sex Matters (advocacy group) =

UK-based anti-transgender group

- Formation: 2021
- Founders: Rebecca Bull; Naomi Cunningham; Maya Forstater; Emma Hilton
- Type: Campaign group
- Registration no.: 1207701
- Legal status: Charitable Incorporated Organisation
- Chief Executive Officer: Maya Forstater
- Key people: Helen Joyce, Director of Advocacy
- Website: sex-matters.org

Sex Matters is a British gender-critical, anti-transgender advocacy group. The organisation was founded in 2021. Sex Matters became a registered charity on 3 April 2024. Sex Matters intervened in the case of For Women Scotland Ltd v The Scottish Ministers at the UK Supreme Court.

== History ==
Sex Matters is a campaign group co-founded in 2021 by Maya Forstater, Rebecca Bull, Naomi Cunningham, and Emma Hilton, with Forstater becoming the CEO of the organisation upon its founding. Forstater had previously won an Employment Tribunal case against her prior employer in Forstater v Centre for Global Development Europe in 2019, which set a precedent in the United Kingdom that gender-critical beliefs were legally protected under the UK Equality Act 2010. The lobbying group opposes transgender rights and has been involved in several legal cases against trans-inclusive legislation in the United Kingdom. Sex Matters's stated aims are to "promote clarity about sex in law, policy and language in order to protect everybody's rights".

The Charity Commission registered Sex Matters as a Charitable Incorporated Organisation in England and Wales on 3 April 2024. In January 2026 it was revealed there was an ongoing investigation being done by the Charity Commission into Sex Matters, according to Sex Matters the investigation was opened over a year prior. Sex Matters has been described variously as "anti-trans", a "human rights charity", "gender-critical", and a "women's rights group". Sociologists McLean and Stretesky describe Sex Matters as part of "a veritable miasma of anti-trans campaign groups ... united in their antipathy toward transgender people", alongside CitizenGo, FiLiA, Fair Play for Women, Get the L Out, LGB Alliance, and Transgender Trend. In September 2025, the Starmer government appointed Tim Allan, previously a trustee of Sex Matters, as director of communications.

== Activities ==
=== Advocacy ===
In 2021, Sex Matters wrote an open letter to the Committee on Standards in Public Life complaining the passport office did not record how many people changed sex on the passport. In October 2023, Sex Matters released guidance advising public bodies to ask about sex as opposed to self-identified gender. In other documents, Sex Matters has called for trans peoples' assigned sex at birth to be on all medical records at all times and for the sex of trans doctors and hospital workers to be a matter of public record. It was presented as common sense without explanation of why such tracking was necessary. This has been described as "invasive surveillance" and "disregarding any right to privacy". Helen Joyce, director of advocacy at Sex Matters has appeared as a speaker at Genspect's conference in 2023.

In June 2024, the Labour Party published a manifesto including a promise to ban conversion therapy, calling it "abuse" and by banning the practice, create "freedom for people to explore their sexual orientation and gender identity". In July 2024, King Charles III announced the new government's plans during his King's Speech including the ban on conversion therapy. Responding to the announcement, in July 2024, Sex Matters called on incoming Prime Minister Keir Starmer not to give Anneliese Dodds, Minister of State for Women and Equalities, the responsibility for Labour's pledge to implement a "full trans-inclusive" ban on conversion therapy, claiming it may be "used to criminalise dissent with gender ideology" (concept opposed by the anti-gender movement).

In May 2025, Fiona McAnena, Sex Matters's director of campaigns, welcomed the Football Association ruling to ban transgender women from playing women's football in England. Later, after a controversy in which a trans woman working as a shop assistant at Marks & Spencer approached a teenage customer and her mother in the underwear section and asked if they needed any assistance, McAnena issued a statement saying "M&S needs to rethink its priorities and remember that women and girls have rights too, and that this man should not be permitted to hang around in the women's underwear department". M&S subsequently apologized, and later added that the store's bra fitting service (which had not been offered by the employee) would only be offered to customers who are "biological females" and only carried out by employees who are the same.

In August 2025, Sex Matters supported GB News host Michelle Dewberry in issuing a legal threat against gym chain Virgin Active, resulting in the chain banning trans women from female changing rooms within the United Kingdom. After the resignation of Tim Davie from the BBC in, Sex Matters wrote an open letter to the BBC in which they demanded that it "Stop referring to 'transgender women'". Sex Matters unsuccessfully lobbied against a resolution of the Council of Europe banning conversion therapy. The resolution was passed in January 2026.

In April 2026, Sex Matters welcomed a regulatory change which banned trans women from competing in women's darts competitions affiliated with the Darts Regulation Authority. The DRA had commissioned a report from Sex Matters board member Emma Hilton which concluded that trans women had an advantage in women's darts.

==== For Women Scotland Ltd v The Scottish Ministers ====
Sex Matters intervened at the UK Supreme Court in the case For Women Scotland Ltd v The Scottish Ministers that was decided in April 2025 and welcomed the Court's ruling. A subsequent YouGov poll commissioned by Sex Matters reported that almost two thirds of those surveyed agreed with the Supreme Court ruling.

==== Peggie v NHS Fife ====
In January 2025, when Sandie Peggie decided to submit a claim to an employment tribunal against NHS Fife and Dr Upton, a transgender doctor, after being placed on leave due to confronting the doctor for being in the women's changing room, Sex Matters supported her by providing legal and media services. Naomi Cunningham, chair of Sex Matters, acted as counsel in a personal capacity.

==== Kenwood Ladies' Pond ====
In July 2025, Sex Matters said it would pursue legal action against the City of London Corporation, over allowing trans women to swim in the Kenwood Ladies' Pond at Hampstead Heath; the Kenwood Ladies' Pond Association had previously voted to reject a definition of 'woman' which excluded trans women. A submission for judicial review was filed in August 2025. The review was dismissed in January 2026, but in March 2026 Sex Matters won a subsequent appeal bid and the case was returned to the High Court.

== See also ==
- Anti-transgender movement in the United Kingdom
- Fair Play for Women
- For Women Scotland
- LGB Alliance
- The Women Who Wouldn't Wheesht (book)
- Woman's Place UK
