= Woman's Place UK =

UK-based anti-transgender group

- Formation: 2017
- Founder: Judith Green; Ruth Serwotka; Kiri Tunks
- Type: Gender-critical feminism
- Region served: United Kingdom
- Website: https://womansplaceuk.org

Woman's Place UK (Note: Formerly known as A Woman's Place UK.) (WPUK) was a British anti-transgender advocacy group founded in 2017. The group was opposed to gender self-identification for transgender people in the UK, and has advocated restricting access to women-only spaces on the basis of "sex, not gender".

== History ==
The group was founded in response to the British government's launch of a consultation on proposals to change the Gender Recognition Act away from a medicalised system towards one based on statutory declaration. In late-July 2018, the group issued five demands:

1. Evidence-based debate about the impact of the proposed reforms;
2. An increase in women-only spaces;
3. A review of exemptions in Equality Act 2010;
4. Women's organisations to be included in the consultation;
5. A review of how the proposed reforms would affect data collection.

In September 2018, Leeds City Council cancelled a booking made by WPUK at Leeds Civic Hall, stating that the group's views were "not in line with Leeds City Council’s values and policies on equality and inclusion" and venues that hosted previous events by the group had attracted safety concerns.

In February 2020, WPUK held an event titled "Women's Liberation 2020" at University College London, including a number of panel discussions and workshops, marking 50 years since the first National Women’s Liberation Conference in the UK.

The group announced that it was ending its campaign on the 28th of November 2024, saying on its website: "After seven years we are ending our campaign, knowing that we have largely achieved our original demands."

== Funding ==
In November 2020, WPUK published accounts revealing that the University of Oxford was one of its biggest funders, having paid the group a £20,000 consultancy fee for its "support research into women's sex-based rights" one year earlier.

In December 2020, Lush gave WPUK £3,000 for "events organisation". After facing criticism for the donation, Lush issued an apology, stating that "we want to assure you that [deliberately funding campaigning against trans rights] would never be our intention and we are sincerely sorry that any of our funding has gone towards doing this".

== Media coverage and criticism ==
The group has been described as transgender-exclusionary radical feminists (TERFs). It has faced opposition from Pride Cymru and the Wales Equality Alliance. The Labour Campaign for Trans Rights has described it as a hate group. London Feminist Library organiser Lola Olufemi described the group as "a clearly transphobic organisation" after she withdrew from an event at the University of Oxford. In her 2021 book The Transgender Issue: An Argument for Justice, author Shon Faye described the organisation as "the most well-known grassroots anti-trans feminist group".

The group has opposed being categorised as TERFs, stating that a number of trans women who oppose gender recognition based on statutory declaration, such as Debbie Hayton and Kristina Harrison, speak at their meetings. In February 2020, 13 academics at University College London wrote an open letter to The Guardian arguing that the group was not a "trans-exclusionist hate group".

== See also ==
- Fair Play for Women
- For Women Scotland
- LGB Alliance
- Sex Matters (advocacy group)
