= Forstater v Centre for Global Development Europe =

2019 UK employment and discrimination legal case

Maya Forstater v Centre for Global Development
- Court: Central London Employment Tribunal
- Decided: 19 December 2019
- Citations: Employment Tribunal: Forstater v CGD Europe & Anor [2019] UKET 2200909; Employment Appeal Tribunal: Forstater v CGD Europe & Ors [2021] UKEAT 0105_20_1006

Case history
- Appealed to: Employment Appeal Tribunal
- Subsequent actions: Appeal argued 27 April 2021; Decided 10 June 2021; Full merits hearing March 2022

Court membership
- Judges sitting: Employment Judge James Tayler at the original tribunal; Mr Justice Choudhury chaired the appeal tribunal; Employment Judge Andrew Glennie at the tribunal on the merits of the case

Forstater v Centre for Global Development Europe is a UK employment and discrimination case brought by Maya Forstater against the Centre for Global Development (CGD). The Employment Appeal Tribunal decided that gender-critical views are capable of being protected as a belief under the Equality Act 2010. The tribunal further clarified that this finding does not mean that people with gender-critical beliefs can express them in a manner that discriminates against trans people.

In 2019, Forstater's consulting contract for CGD was not renewed after she published a series of social media messages describing transgender women as men during online discourse regarding potential reforms to the Gender Recognition Act, which led to concerns being raised by staff at CGD. Forstater challenged the non-renewal of her contract at the Central London Employment Tribunal. In December 2019, a preliminary hearing was held to establish whether Forstater's beliefs qualified as a protected belief under the Equality Act 2010. Employment Judge Tayler ruled that they did not qualify and stated that her gender-critical views were "incompatible with human dignity and fundamental rights of others".

Forstater appealed, and the appeal was heard by the Employment Appeal Tribunal in April 2021. The decision was reserved, with the decision in her favour published on 10 June 2021. As with the original hearing, the appeal was on the narrow issue of whether her beliefs were protected under the Equality Act. The Employment Appeal Tribunal found that Forstater's beliefs were protected, meeting the final requirement in Grainger plc v Nicholson, specifically that they were "worthy of respect in a democratic society". In 2022, after a full merits hearing, the Employment Tribunal upheld Forstater's case by concluding that she had suffered direct discrimination on the basis of her gender critical beliefs. The judgement for remedies was handed down in June 2023, with Forstater awarded compensation of £91,500 for loss of earnings, injury to feelings and aggravated damages, with an additional £14,900 added as interest.

== Background ==
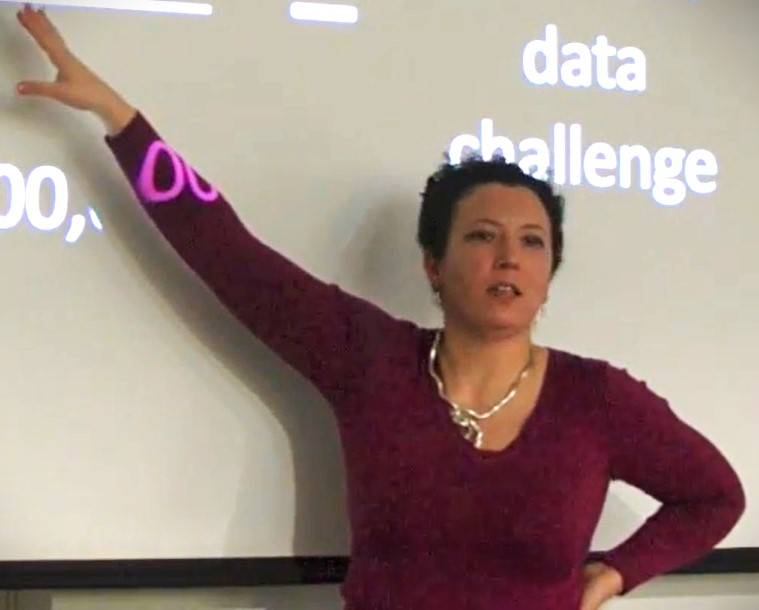
Forstater in 2013

Forstater, a tax expert and researcher on sustainable business and international development, was contracted in January 2015 by CGD, a think-tank on international development, as a visiting fellow. Forstater has had academic research on corporate responsibility and illicit financial flows published by the United Nations Industrial Development Organization and the Chr. Michelsen Institute. She was also previously a researcher for the United Nations Environment Programme Inquiry into; The Design of a Sustainable Financial Systems.

In September 2018 Forstater shared a series of messages on her personal Twitter account. She also had a private discussion with one member of staff who wanted to discuss the issue on Slack. She argued that it is not possible to change sex, that "women" means "adult human female" and that men cannot become women, whilst discussing potential changes to the Gender Recognition Act which would have allowed a Gender Recognition Certificate to be obtained on the basis on self-identification. Members of staff at CGD's Washington DC office raised concern which led to an investigation. In December 2018 her contract expired and CGD decided not to renew it due to her views, which led to Forstater suing CGD for direct and indirect belief discrimination, indirect sex discrimination, and victimisation.

== Employment Tribunal ==
On 13–21 November 2019 preliminary hearings were heard at the Central London Employment Tribunal. The question before the hearing was whether Forstater's view that "sex is biological, binary, immutable and important" was covered by the protected characteristic "religion and belief" under section 10 of the Equality Act. Forstater paid for her legal representation through a crowdsourced fundraiser, raising over £120,000. Forstater stated that she "respected people's pronouns and rights to freedom of expression", but "enforcing the dogma that transwomen are women is totalitarian". Barrister Anya Palmer represented Forstater. According to barrister Naomi Cunningham, Palmer had had the idea of "running a case on religion or belief discrimination, on what’s now called gender critical belief" even before Palmer had found a client, Forstater, for such a case.

Messages shared by Forstater on social media were presented in court as evidence. This included messages on her personal Twitter account where she shared her opposition to proposed changes to the Gender Recognition Act and stated that "men cannot change into women". She also described Pippa Bunce, a gender fluid person who won an award for Executive Businesswoman of the Year, as "a man in a dress".

On 19 December 2019 a 26-page judgment was published finding that her view was "incompatible with human dignity and fundamental rights of others" and therefore not afforded protection under the Equality Act. Judge Tayler found that Forstater's "absolutist" beliefs satisfied the first four parts of Grainger plc v Nicholson (2009) with some reservations about its "cogency and coherence". He found it failed the fifth part, because it was not "worthy of respect in a democratic society".

Upon losing the case, Forstater stated that the judgment "removes women's rights and the right to freedom of belief and speech". She appealed the judgment, which was heard by the Employment Appeal Tribunal over two days on 27 and 28 April 2021. The decision in her favour was delivered on 10 June 2021.

=== Reactions to initial judgment ===
Louise Rea, a solicitor with Bates Wells which advised CGD stated that Judge Tayler had "observed that the claimant was not entitled to ignore the legal rights of a person who has transitioned from male to female or vice versa" and that "it is the fact that her belief necessarily involves violating the dignity of others which means it is not protected under the Equality Act."

In October 2020, the Employment Tribunal in the case of Higgs v Farmor's School questioned the Forstater judgment, stating "to find as the tribunals did in [Forstater] would amount to a declaration that it is ‘open season’ on people that hold and express the beliefs in question – that they do not deserve protection. That seemed to us to be a strange and somewhat disturbing conclusion."

In January 2021, international human rights lawyer Robert Wintemute criticised the judgement, in an article published in Industrial Law Journal. He argued that the Employment Tribunal had "merged hypothetical (speculative, future) harmful action into M Forstater's belief", despite a lack of any evidence of Forstater having taken such action, or any evidence of her intent to do so in the future, concluding that had the Employment Tribunal not conflated the two, "it would have concluded that her belief is 'worthy of respect in a democratic society'". Furthermore, he argued that the Employment Tribunal "erred in law", by expanding the fifth Grainger criterion to include "any belief that some persons might find 'offensive', and therefore consider harassment".

Writing for UCL Faculty of Laws blog UK Labour Law, Amir Paz-Fuchs, Professor of Law and Social Justice at the University of Sussex, argued that the "right to privacy and the right to freedom of speech should have been front and center to the analysis" in this case. Referencing the fact that there was no evidence or claim of Forstater targeting colleagues, coupled with evidence that she would respect people's identities and pronouns in a professional setting, meant that her right to privacy had been violated by the judgement in that "she is sanctioned for her beliefs, and not for the manifestation of those beliefs" which was not relevant to her role as an employee. Karon Monaghan QC, writing for the same site, argued that the decision was unlikely to be upheld at appeal, considering that the judgement went beyond the scope of issues under consideration. Further, she disputed the idea that the "absolutist" nature of Forstater's beliefs negated their protection, citing the protection of other such beliefs, both political and religious.

== Employment Appeal Tribunal ==
In June 2021, an Employment Appeal Tribunal ruled that Forstater's beliefs were covered under the protected belief characteristic within the meaning of the Equality Act, quashing the finding of the previous tribunal. As with the original hearing, the appeal tribunal made no determinations on the substantive merits of the case. The appeal was allowed after the appeal tribunal concluded the belief that "biological sex is real, important and immutable" met the legal test of a "genuine and important philosophical position", and "could not be shown to be a direct attempt to harm others." As such these beliefs were afforded protection under the Equality Act.

Both Index on Censorship and The Equality and Human Rights Commission (EHRC) were given leave to intervene in support of the appeal. Index on Censorship wrote that their "focus was on the core principle of free expression and protecting free speech in law" and also said that "the toxic nature of the current conversation on gender and trans rights is doing little to build bridges or solidarity." The EHRC stated that their position was that Forstater's views were "a philosophical belief which is protected under the Equality Act", and were represented at the appeal by Karon Monaghan QC.

The judgement noted:

Just as the legal recognition of civil partnerships does not negate the right of a person to believe that marriage should only apply to heterosexual couples, becoming the acquired gender 'for all purposes' within the meaning of GRA does not negate a person's right to believe, like the claimant, that as a matter of biology a trans person is still their natal sex. Both beliefs may well be profoundly offensive and even distressing to many others, but they are beliefs that are and must be tolerated in a pluralist society.

The summary went on to say:

This judgment does not mean that those with gender-critical beliefs can 'misgender' trans persons with impunity. The Claimant, like everyone else, will continue to be subject to the prohibitions on discrimination and harassment under the [Equality Act].

On 28 June 2021 the CGDE and CGD announced that they would not be appealing the judgment on philosophical belief to the Court of Appeal. A full merits hearing, to consider whether Forstater was discriminated on the basis of belief, was heard in March 2022.

=== Reactions to appeal ===
In an interview with Law Society Gazette in June 2021, Peter Daly, Forstater's solicitor, said: "At the heart of the case is a belief in the binary nature of biological sex, which the judgment makes clear is a fairly uncontroversial statement of law." The Law Society Gazette also reported that following the ruling, Amanda Glassman, executive vice-president of CGD, said: "The decision is disappointing and surprising because we believe [the tribunal judge] got it right when he found this type of offensive speech causes harm to trans people, and therefore could not be protected under the Equality Act."

In an article in Personnel Today, Darren Newman said that the original tribunal had "set the bar of 'worthy of respect' far too high. The only beliefs that are actually excluded by that requirement are the most extreme beliefs 'akin to Nazism or totalitarianism or which incite hatred or violence'."

In Scottish Legal News Louise Usher said: 'As a result of this decision, employees with gender critical views are entitled to protection from discrimination and harassment. However, this does not impact on the existing protection from discrimination and harassment under the EqA [Equality Act] 2010 for trans persons. It is also important to bear in mind that, as a consequence of the recent Taylor v Jaguar Land Rover decision, those identifying as non-binary are also entitled to protection. Therefore, it is incumbent on employers to ensure that their employees tolerate opposing beliefs and act in a non-offensive way to others."

In an article in the Law Society Gazette in July 2021, Tess Barrett, a solicitor, commented on the appeal judgment, which she said "is not a permission for those who hold gender critical beliefs to misgender with impunity and nor is it a removal of existing transgender rights". She also said: "Whereas the previous judgment effectively silenced those holding gender critical views, the EAT judgment means that neither view in the transgender debate is silenced. How those beliefs are communicated is what is key and this judgment does not entitle, and should not embolden, either side on the transgender debate to harass the other due to their beliefs." She said that, since the CGDE and CGD will not be appealing the EAT judgment, "This means that gender critical beliefs' status as a protected philosophical belief is binding on the lower courts and unlikely to be changed unless parliament legislates to the contrary."

== Full merits hearing ==
The full merits hearing on the case was held at the Employment Tribunal in March 2022, with Employment Judge Andrew Glennie presiding. The purpose of this hearing was to hear both the issue of Forstater's status as an employee and arguments as to why her contract was not renewed.

Legal representation for CGD argued that Forstater did not qualify as an employee, under section 83 of the Equality Act, and that Forstater's contract was not renewed because of the way in which she expressed her belief. Counsel further referenced Lee v Ashers Baking Company Ltd and others, stating that requiring an employer to "maintain its association with someone who is expressing beliefs and opinions that they do not want to express" amounted to 'compelled speech' contrary to the employer's rights under Article 10 of the Human Rights Act 1998.

Counsel for Forstater argued that there was an "overarching employment relationship" between CGD and his client, referencing Addison Lee vs Lange, and that CGD had acted with prejudice and a lack of tolerance towards Forstater, on the basis of her gender-critical views. He further argued that those with such views are a "vulnerable group, easily stigmatised for their belief", and stated that the fact that some were "too ready to take offence" at these views was a compelling reason to enforce their protection.

The decision of the tribunal hearing the full merits of the case, delivered in July 2022, was that Forstater had been subjected to direct discrimination and also victimisation because of her gender-critical beliefs. The judgement for remedies was handed down in June 2023, with Forstater awarded compensation of £91,500 for loss of earnings, injury to feelings and aggravated damages, with an additional £14,900 added as interest.

== See also ==
- UK labour law
- European labor-law
