= Maya Forstater =

British gender-critical activist (born 1973)

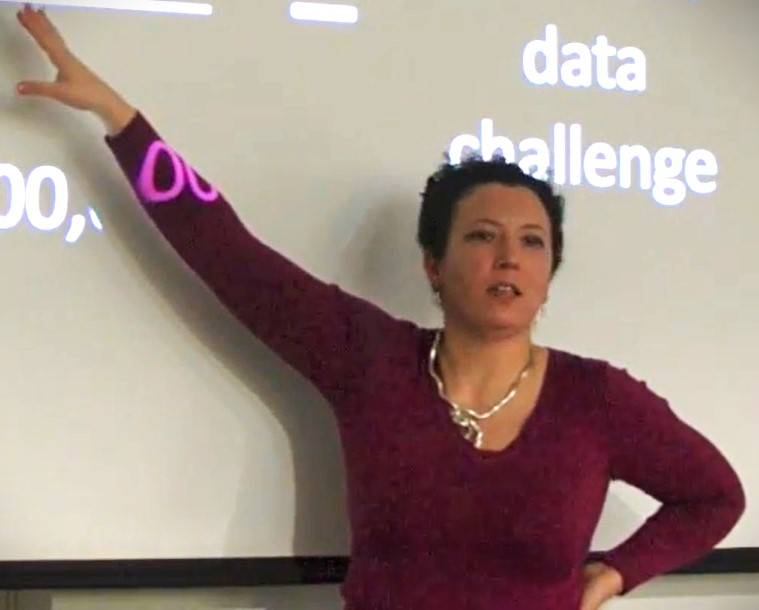
- Forstater in 2013
- Born: 3 July 1973 (age 53); London, England
- Education: Newcastle University
- Known for: Forstater v Center for Global Development Europe legal case
- Father: Mark Forstater

Maya Forstater (born 3 July 1973) is a British tax expert and gender-critical activist. She was the claimant in Forstater v Centre for Global Development Europe. The case established that gender critical views are protected as a belief under the Equality Act 2010, while stating that the judgment does not permit misgendering transgender people with impunity. At a subsequent full merits hearing, the Employment Tribunal upheld Forstater's case, concluding that she had suffered direct discrimination on the basis of her gender critical beliefs.

== Career ==
Forstater holds a degree from Newcastle University. In 2002, she co-authored a technical report for the United Nations Industrial Development Organization on corporate social responsibility for small and medium enterprises. She has published academic research on corporate responsibility and illicit financial flows. Her collaborators include Simon Zadek and Peter Raynard. She has been senior researcher for the United Nations Environment Programme Inquiry into The Design of a Sustainable Financial Systems and in 2015 she became a consultant at the Center for Global Development (CGD), a think-tank that campaigns against poverty. She described her work as being "in a field of technocratic activism: think tank research, where people are expected to be mission driven and to share their personal, evidence based, opinion in order to influence public policy debates towards socially beneficial goals".

== Legal case ==
In 2019, Forstater's consulting contract for CGD was not renewed after – during online discourse regarding potential reforms to the Gender Recognition Act – she published a series of social media messages describing transgender women as still being men, which led to concerns being raised by staff at CGD. Forstater challenged the non-renewal of her contract at the Central London Employment Tribunal. In December 2019, a hearing was held to establish whether Forstater's beliefs qualified as a protected belief under the Equality Act 2010. Judge Tayler ruled that they did not, stating that her gender critical views were "incompatible with human dignity and fundamental rights of others".

Forstater appealed against the judgment, and this was heard by the Employment Appeal Tribunal in April 2021. Judgment was reserved, and the decision in her favour published on 10 June 2021. As with the original hearing, the appeal was specifically on the narrow issue of whether her beliefs were protected under the Equality Act, and thus amounted to a protected belief. The judgment found that Forstater's gender-critical beliefs were protected, meeting the final requirement in Grainger plc v Nicholson, specifically that they were "worthy of respect in a democratic society". However, in its judgment, the Tribunal clarified that this finding does not mean that people with gender-critical beliefs can express them in a way that discriminates against trans people. A full merits hearing on Forstater's claim that she lost her employment as a result of these beliefs was heard in March 2022, and the decision was delivered in July 2022. The decision of the Employment Tribunal upheld Forstater's case, concluding that she had suffered direct discrimination on the basis of her gender-critical beliefs. The judgment for remedies was handed down in June 2023, with Forstater awarded compensation of £91,500 for loss of earnings, injury to feelings and aggravated damages, with an additional £14,900 added as interest.

== Campaigning ==
In March 2019, Forstater criticised the Minister for Women and Equalities, Penny Mordaunt, for her Mumsnet webchat on International Women's Day. Mordaunt received many questions regarding women and transgender people; she did not answer them. Forstater wrote in The Independent that Mordaunt had asked for "discussions on the topic of sex and gender identity to take place in a 'climate of respect, empathy and understanding', but when faced with a group of mothers asking respectful and carefully researched questions, she ducked and ran".

In late-May 2021, Forstater commented under an article published in The BMJ that she believed gender identity should not be used in the collection of sex data for medical matters. The authors of the article responded that she had "misrepresented" their point, as they were not advocating that gender identity be used as a proxy for sex, but rather that "relevant and accurate information about a person's body and health needs cannot reliably be assumed with sex assigned at birth data." In their response, the article's authors emphasised that "many cisgender and transgender people have the ability to become pregnant". Forstater's experiences are referred to in Kathleen Stock's book Material Girls: Why Reality Matters for Feminism in the context of how the charity Stonewall might influence court rulings.

In May 2021, Forstater was among 41 signatories to an open letter calling on the Equality and Human Rights Commission (EHRC) to end its membership of the Stonewall Diversity Champions scheme, and on the Committee on Standards in Public Life to oversee a review of "the role of Stonewall in public life" and its "influence and control" over the Human Resources policies of public institutions. Later that month, the EHRC withdrew its membership of the Stonewall scheme. Also in 2021, Baroness Falkner of Margravine, the new EHRC chair, mentioned Forstater in her first interview after taking office, citing her as someone who had faced abuse for her views and stating that "a lot of people would find [it] an entirely reasonable belief" that "people who self identify as a different sex are not the different sex that they self identify." Forstater was an invited speaker to a University of Cambridge student event on the topic of freedom of speech and belief. In December 2021, Forstater received an apology from The Scout Association after a complaint was made against her, and published the text of the apology on her website. Forstater had described the complaint as "vexatious".

=== Support from J. K. Rowling ===
In December 2019, author J. K. Rowling tweeted #IStandWithMaya in support of Forstater's legal case. The two first met in person at a lunch in April 2022 hosted by Rowling for gender-critical activists. Forstater described the occasion as "emotional" and praised Rowling as a "source of strength".

=== Sex Matters ===
In 2021, Forstater became a founding officer of the gender-critical organization Sex Matters alongside co-founders Rebecca Bull, Naomi Cunningham, and Emma Hilton. The lobbying group opposes transgender rights and has been involved in several legal cases against trans-inclusive legislation in the United Kingdom. In July 2024, a letter from Sex Matters, signed by Forstater, called on incoming Prime Minister Keir Starmer not to give Anneliese Dodds, Minister of State for Women and Equalities, responsibility for Labour's pledge to implement a "trans-inclusive" ban on conversion therapy. In April 2025, Forstater, as Chief Executive of Sex Matters welcomed the Supreme Court ruling that "the terms woman and sex in the Equality Act 2010 refer to a biological woman and biological sex" in the case For Women Scotland Ltd v The Scottish Ministers, stating "the protected characteristic of sex - male and female - refers to reality, not to paperwork."

== Personal life ==
Forstater is a daughter of American film producer Mark Forstater.

== Selected works ==
- Raynard, Peter; Forstater, Maya (2002). Corporate Social Responsibility: Implications for Small and Medium Enterprises in Developing Countries (PDF) (Report). United Nations Industrial Development Organization. Archived from the original (PDF) on 20 February 2006.
- Forstater, Maya; MacDonald, Jacqui; Raynard, Peter (2002). Business and Poverty: Bridging the Gap. International Business Leaders Forum. ISBN 1-899159-05-3. OCLC 224647082.
- Forstater, Maya; Oelschaegel, Jeannette; Sillanpaa, Maria (1 July 2006). What Assures Consumers?. AccountAbility. ISBN 9781901693263.
- Zadek, Simon; Forstater, Maya; Naidoo, Sharmala (July 2012). Shaping a Sustainable Future (PDF) (Report). UN Development Cooperation Forum.
