= Archives of Sexual Behavior =

- Discipline: Clinical psychiatry
- Language: English
- Edited by: Kenneth Zucker

Publication details
- History: 1971–present
- Publisher: Springer Science+Business Media
- Frequency: Bimonthly
- Open access: Hybrid
- Impact factor: 2.9 (2023)

Standard abbreviations
- ISO 4: Arch. Sex. Behav.

Indexing
- CODEN: ASXBA
- ISSN: 0004-0002 (print); 1573-2800 (web)
- LCCN: 71648996
- OCLC no.: 1183760

Links
- Journal homepage; Online archive

The Archives of Sexual Behavior is a bimonthly peer-reviewed medical journal in sexology. It is the official publication of the International Academy of Sex Research.

== History ==
The journal was established in 1971 by Richard Green, who served as its editor-in-chief until 2001. He was succeeded by Kenneth J. Zucker. It is published by Springer Science+Business Media. In 2009, it was described as a "leading journal of sexual research" in a New York Times article.

== Abstracting and indexing ==
The journal is abstracted and indexed in Biological Abstracts, Current Contents/Social & Behavioral Sciences, EMBASE, Family & Society Studies Worldwide, Health and Safety Science Abstracts, Index Medicus/MEDLINE, Psychological Abstracts, PsycINFO, Referativny Zhurnal, Risk Abstracts, Sage Family Studies Abstracts, Scopus, Sexual and Relations Therapy, Social Sciences Citation Index, Social Science Index, Sociological Abstracts, Studies on Women & Gender Abstracts, and Violence and Abuse Abstracts. According to the Journal Citation Reports, the journal's 2023 impact factor is 2.9.

== Controversies ==
=== Attempted retraction of conversion therapy paper ===
In 2003, a paper by Robert Spitzer was published outside "the usual peer-review process". This was based on 200 self-selected phone interviews, including some with members of the ex-gay movement who self-reported that conversion therapy (a.k.a. "reparative therapy") changed their sexual orientation. The paper concluded: "There is evidence that change in sexual orientation following some form of reparative therapy does occur in some gay men and lesbians." Before publication, the paper was presented at a psychiatry conference in 2001, after which it "generated enormous public attention and controversy". The journal published the paper alongside critical commentaries, including one saying conversion therapy violates ethics as defined by the Nuremberg Code. Spitzer's paper became cited by political activists opposed to homosexuality, and the ex-gay movement. Spitzer later agreed with critics of his paper's methodology, calling them "largely correct". In 2012, he asked the journal's editor (Kenneth Zucker) to retract it. Zucker declined to retract the paper. A letter to the editor by Spitzer later appeared in the journal on the matter.

=== Accusations of editorial bias and subsequent boycott ===
In March, 2023, the Archives of Sexual Behavior published a paper on rapid-onset gender dysphoria, authored by J. Michael Bailey and Suzanna Diaz, which has been described as "methodologically flawed" by the Southern Poverty Law Centre.

Researchers and LGBTQ organizations wrote an open letter to Springer Nature, the publisher, charging that the paper lacked institutional review board (IRB) approval and replicates "the severe methodological and interpretive flaws of previous research". The letter also stated the journal had a history of publishing questionable research under Zucker and signatories pledged to boycott the journal until Zucker was "replaced with an editor who has a demonstrated record of integrity on LGBTQ+ matters, and, especially, trans matters." The press officer of the Center for Applied Transgender Studies, which signed the letter, stated that "[a]rticles published in the journal during Dr. Zucker's editorship have repeatedly drawn criticism from the sections of the LGBTQ+ community about which the article claims to advance sexological knowledge".

On May 10, a Publisher's Note was added to the article noting that concerns had been raised about its methodology. A spokesperson for Springer Nature said the paper's supplementary information "has been removed and a note added to record that this has been removed due to a lack of documented consent by study participants". The same month, the Foundation Against Intolerance and Racism launched a counter-petition calling for Zucker to be kept and the article not be retracted, with signatories from the Society for Evidence-Based Gender Medicine, Genspect, the Gender Exploratory Therapy Association, and the American College of Pediatricians. The paper was retracted by Springer in June 2023 due to the lack of IRB approval.
