= Foundation Against Intolerance and Racism =

American nonprofit organization (2021-)

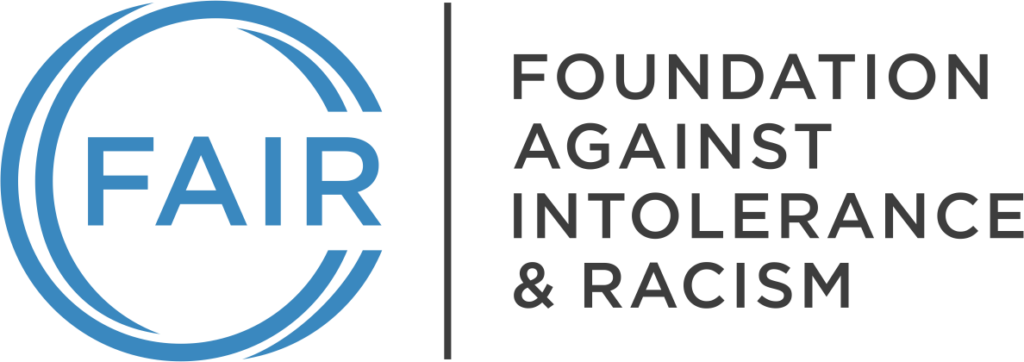
- Formation: 2021; 5 years ago
- Founder: Bion Bartning
- Headquarters: New York City
- Website: www.fairforall.org

The Foundation Against Intolerance and Racism (FAIR) is an American nonprofit organization founded in 2021.

The group has campaigned against diversity and inclusion programs, ethnic studies curricula, and antiracism initiatives that it refers to as "critical race theory" (CRT). Critics argue that the organization conflates CRT with any race-related discussions, distorting its academic origins. In addition, FAIR has taken a stance against gender-inclusive policies in schools, particularly regarding the use of preferred gender pronouns and lessons on gender identity. The organization claims that such policies infringe on free speech and religious freedoms, often challenging the legality of these measures in various school districts. The group has supported lawsuits against school equity policies and opposed race-based COVID-19 treatment guidelines.

== Founding and advisors ==
FAIR was founded in early 2021 by Bion Bartning, an investor, entrepreneur and co-founder of Eos Products. Bartning had sent his children to attend Riverdale Country School, a private college-prep school located in New York City. He observed his children's schooling in the fall of 2020, which was conducted virtually over Zoom. The school introduced a theme of "allyship" for the school year, promoting the idea that members of "privileged classes" should advance the interests and the voices of oppressed groups over their own. The students were shown a video of the school's mascot instructing them that they needed to "check each other's words and actions". After removing his children from Riverdale Country School, Bartning founded FAIR to oppose antiracist efforts that he views as "a kind of religion taking hold in American education that forces people into categories according to their race." He argued the initiatives did more harm than good by focusing on differences between people. Bartning established FAIR in January 2021 and expressed his concerns about how schools teach about racism in a March Wall Street Journal opinion piece.

The organization is a nonprofit. Monica Harris, a lawyer and business executive, is the organization's executive director.

FAIR describes itself as non-partisan and "pro-human". Bartning is a self-described independent who says he grew up with liberal values. FAIR has a diverse board of advisors comprising around 50 people, including journalists, academics, artists, and human rights activists. Advisors include Megyn Kelly, Daryl Davis, Ayaan Hirsi Ali, John McWhorter, Glenn Loury, Melissa Chen, Bari Weiss, and Abigail Shrier. The organization says it is non-partisan, and its board includes cognitive scientist Steven Pinker, a Democrat, as well as venture capitalist and Republican donor Alexander Lloyd. Conservative activist Christopher Rufo was formerly an advisory board member.

== Activism and positions ==
=== Opposition to diversity, equity and inclusion policies ===
Almost all the cases profiled on FAIR's website involved battling what it calls critical race theory (CRT). A FAIR spokesperson denied the organization was founded to combat CRT and stated that it seeks to advocate for "one human race". FAIR hosts a message board where members discuss their activism against CRT in schools. Visitors to FAIR's website can report schools and organizations for teaching about diversity, equity, and inclusion in divisive ways. Critics have likened their approach to an All Lives Matter mentality, which was a response to the Black Lives Matter movement that sought to delegitimize the notion that Black people have been systematically discriminated against in the United States. According to experts and educators interviewed by Lancaster Online, what FAIR calls CRT is not CRT, but a catch-all term for anything race-related. CRT is a legal study of the ways in which race has been created, defined, and embedded into law throughout American history.

In January 2021, FAIR and anti-LGBT organizations including the Alliance Defending Freedom and the International Organization for the Family collaborated to support a federal lawsuit by a mother in Nevada claimed that her biracial son could not opt out of a mandatory sociology class that "appeared to be teaching students critical race theory and intersectionality".

In April, FAIR opposed a federal grant program supporting American history and civics education projects that, among other criteria, "incorporate racially, ethnically, culturally, and linguistically diverse perspectives". FAIR also highlighted, as a "profile in courage", a legal challenge to a debt relief program for Black farmers.

In June, FAIR started a campaign to support Dana Stangel-Plower, who resigned from the Dwight-Englewood School due to what she called "essentialist, racialist thinking". In her resignation letter she stated "this year, administrators continue to assert D-E's policy that we are hiring 'for diversity,' D-E has become a workplace that is hostile toward educators based solely on their immutable traits."

In August, an event at the American Legion in Island Pond about CRT featured Ben Morely, who started the Vermont chapter of FAIR and encouraged the crowd to vote down school budgets, file Freedom of Information Act requests to find what teachers are teaching, and take legal action against school districts if they found "evidence of indoctrination or discrimination". In December, Morley announced that he was running for a seat on the Lake Region Union High School board in Orleans County, Vermont. Local papers in Vermont published commentaries from parents that copied, word-for-word, a template letter from FAIR.

In September, conservative speakers at a Springfield forum about CRT denounced diversity education curricula ahead of a school district discussion about the use of DEI education in Springfield schools. Gregory Thayer, the founder of Vermonters for Vermont, objected to the term "equity" and advocated for the curricular approach outlined by FAIR.

In May 2022, FAIR wrote a letter to the Superintendent of Evanston/Skokie School District 65, Devon Horton, claiming that lessons teach young children that people are in danger because of whiteness, that racism is exclusively associated with whiteness, and that it claims without qualification that white people have more opportunities than "non-white" people.

In June, the University of California shelved a draft for a proposal that would add a semester of ethnic studies as a requirement for admission. FAIR wrote a letter opposing the policy, claiming it would lead to content that is highly political and ideological and promotes "divisive and radical ideas that pressure students to become activists to foment a political revolution".

A statement from the El Paso/Teller County chapter of FAIR opposed the equity policy adopted by the Colorado Springs School District 11 in May 2020. The policy, which was developed with input from more than 2000 community members in 2019, said that the district would support the equitable allocation of funding, diverse hiring practices, and a "culturally responsive" curriculum and training for staff about historic achievement inequities between white and nonwhite students.

In January 2022, Joseph Boyle of the El Paso-Teller chapter of FAIR criticized an audit by the American Institute of Research that was paid for by Colorado Springs School District 11. The audit found racial disparities in student achievement, both when comparing schools and students in the same school, and found this to be due to a concentration of high-needs students, school spending patterns, differences in access to better teachers, implicit biases, and low diversity among teachers. Boyle stated the "equity audit appears not to be a product of open inquiry, but the result of a quest to justify a predetermined ideological conclusion." Alexis Knox-Miller, the equity director, hosted "equity cafes" where parents and community members could discuss the reports which FAIR members attended to criticize the focus on equity as racism and "race essentialism". Knox-Miller stated that FAIR "followed me to every community cafe", were "poisoning the room", and that Boyle's complaint about equity work felt personal to her, stating "I'm a Black woman, and I'm sorry, the world looks at me through a racialized lens. We're not colorblind."

In September, Jeff Campbell, leader of the Twin Cities chapter of FAIR, wrote a statement to the Minnesota Professional Educator Licensing and Standards Board (PELSB) criticizing their new standards, which included language requiring teachers to acknowledge the various backgrounds and gender identities of their students. Since 2020, teachers have had to participate in cultural competency training to renew their licenses, so the proposed changes would make new teacher licenses match the renewal process. Campbell stated that students are best served when they are all treated the same. FAIR argued that the new standards fall outside the agency's authority and that their implementation would complicate educator licensing requirements amid a teacher shortage.

=== Emory Free Speech Forum ===
In November 2021, Emory Law School's Student Bar Association (SBA) rejected a charter requested by the Emory Free Speech Forum (EFSF). The charter would have meant that the organization could receive University funding, use University spaces, and advertise at the school's activity fair. The SBA wrote that it denied the charter because the group's goals overlapped with other established clubs and because they were concerned with the lack of safeguards such as moderators to facilitate discussions. The EFSF wrote to FAIR and the Foundation for Individual Rights in Education (FIRE) for assistance. Letitia Kim, managing director of the Legal Network at FAIR, wrote a letter to the SBA president, Jadyn Taylor, urging the board to reverse their decision to reject the charter proposal. In late March, the SBA granted EFSF's charter. When the EFSF began to promote their event with FAIR titled "A Pro-Human Approach to Civil Rights", students began to protest the event and FAIR, describing it as a transphobic organization opposed to CRT.

=== Transgender students ===
The Southern Poverty Law Center released a report that described FAIR in Medicine as "a key voice amplifying anti-LGBTQ+ pseudoscience". The report stated FAIR uses the framing of "parental rights" to suppress LGBTQ+ representation and that it fights to oppose the social affirmation of transgender people. FAIR's FAIR in Medicine program is led by Carrie Mendoza, an advisor to Genspect and Detrans help. It attempts to distinguish "talk therapy" from other forms of conversion therapy and has opposed a Department of Homeland Security nondiscrimination rule covering gender identity. FAIR made comments to the Department of Education opposing Title IX nondiscrimination protections for transgender students.

In September 2021, the conservative True North Reports published an open letter by Ben Morley, the FAIR Vermont chapter founder, to his son's teacher questioning why his son had been asked to share his pronouns in an eighth-grade humanities class.

In December, Letitia Kim, managing director of FAIR's legal network, argued that a school questionnaire at Jamesville-Dewitt (NY) Central School District which asked students their preferred pronouns violated the First Amendment of the United States Constitution since "requiring students to choose their pronouns is effectively demanding that they affirm a particular set of ideological beliefs about sex and gender, which many do not share" and "while teachers should permit students to declare their pronouns if they so choose, they may not require them to do so."

In May 2022, FAIR argued that lessons on gender and pronouns in the Evanston/Skokie School District 65 violate students' religious rights by "teaching students that they must use alternative pronouns" and were not age appropriate for those aged 4–9 since they are "not yet developed or informed enough to fully understand, analyze, or critique those concepts."

In 2022, the Fairfax County School Board added protections for transgender students encountering misgendering in school in the 2022-2023 Student Rights and Responsibilities (SR&R) handbook. FAIR raised concerns that it would conflict with the First Amendment's free speech protections and their attorney supported the inclusion of the term "malicious" stating students "might have a sincerely held belief that prohibits them from using another student's chosen pronoun."

In August, a parent at New Trier High School submitted an anonymous complaint to FAIR about surveys of students' preferred pronouns. Among other things, the letter stated that withholding a student's gender identity or pronouns from a parent infringes on parental rights.

FAIR has partnered with organizations seeking to elect anti-LGBT candidates in Canada, including Parents As First Educators (PAFE), an Ontario-based organization founded in 2011 to protest progressive changes to the Catholic School Board's sex education curriculum, such as introducing the concept of gender identity and mentioning contraception in elementary school, in favor of an abstinence-first curriculum. PAFE then began to campaign against federal bills banning conversion therapy. The "Blueprint for Canada" campaign is a shared policy platform intended to be adopted by candidates who support at least 80% of its points. Blueprint for Canada was forced to take down its lists of recommended anti-LGBTQ2S+ candidates over potential violations of provincial election regulation.

On October 17, FAIR hosted a webinar titled "Understanding Gender Dysphoria and Its Impact on Clinical Care" with Lisa Littman, Stella O'Malley, Zander Keig, Teva Johnstone, and Dr. Carrie Mendoza. Littman coined the term "rapid-onset gender dysphoria" in a 2018 study based on parent reports on three websites known for their transphobic discourse. On October 20, FAIR legal analyst Reid Newton and FAIR attorney Leigh-Ann O'Neill published an opinion piece in The Hill criticizing the U.S. Department of Health and Human Services' proposed Nondiscrimination in Health Programs and Activities Rule to protect access to gender-affirming care. A week later, they spoke at Emory University School of Law. Following protests, Newton maintained that they were not transphobic and that they wished to ensure that transgender people can give informed consent.

In May 2023, FAIR sponsored a letter to Springer Nature demanding they refuse to retract a paper on Rapid Onset Gender Dysphoria and retain Kenneth Zucker as the journal's editor. The paper was retracted in June on the grounds that the authors did not properly obtain informed consent from the participants. Zucker was retained as editor. In September 2023, FAIR supported a petition by members of the Society for Evidence-Based Gender Medicine (SEGM) and Genspect that called on the U.S. Food and Drug Administration to halt the prescription of puberty blockers to trans youth. At the time, FAIR's board of advisors included SEGM advisors Stella O'Malley and Robert P. George.

=== Other lawsuits ===
In 2020, complaints from various colleagues prompted Hennepin Healthcare to remove Dr. Tara Gustilo as chair of the Department of Obstetrics and Gynecology. These included complaints of microaggressions and racism. By the summer of 2020, Gustilo was making posts on Facebook criticizing Black Lives Matter and "critical race theory", supporting Donald Trump, and calling COVID-19 "the China virus". In January 2021, the hospital presented her with the findings and asked her to voluntarily step down as chair. When she refused, 13 of the 14 doctors in her department wrote a letter detailing their lack of confidence in her leadership and outlining how she lost their trust. In April, 25 members of the Medical Executive committee voted to remove her from her position as chair. In June 2021, with the help of FAIR, the Upper Midwest Law Center, and America First Legal, Gustilo filed a complaint with the Equal Employment Opportunity Commission alleging she had been discriminated against due to her race. In February 2022 she filed a lawsuit seeking over $75,000 in damages. The lawsuit also challenged the hospital's practice of "racially concordant care", which she labeled "segregation". The program in question was implemented due to evidence that rates of infant mortality and pregnancy-related deaths are higher among Black and Native American women, but disparities lessen when Black or Native American providers are involved.

In June 2021, Lee County Sheriff Carmine Marceno arrested a 10-year-old boy for allegedly making written threats to commit a school shooting at his elementary school in text messages to a friend. Letitia Kim stated that the messages did not contain any kind of threat but did include Google images of assault rifles. At the time of the arrest, Marceno deemed the messages to be a "fake threat", but arrested him anyways stating "this child made a fake threat, and now he's experiencing real consequences". The boy's father maintained his son's innocence, stating the texts about money and guns were a bad joke about scamming a friend out of money and were not a threat. FAIR filed an official request to the U.S. Department of Justice to investigate the sheriff's office for law enforcement misconduct.

In June 2022, Brown University expanded eligibility for a "Mindfulness-Based Stress Reduction" teacher training class that had originally restricted enrollment exclusively to racial and ethnic minorities. FAIR submitted a complaint via letter to Brown University President Christina Paxson which accused the university of segregating the class and violating Title VI of the Civil Rights Act. The class was subsequently opened to all students. Eric Loucks, the director of Brown's Mindfulness center, stated "the intent is to reach future teachers who have a special interest in or history of personal engagement with the experiences of Black, Indigenous, and/or Latino/Latina/Latinx peoples and others who have been underrepresented in the mindfulness field, this is regardless of the participant's race".

The same month, Keith Ray, a part-time teaching artist at New 42, filed a lawsuit supported by FAIR accusing the organization of discriminating against white employees, saying that the institution’s diversity trainings were themselves discriminatory.

In May, FAIR filed an amicus brief in the case Students for Fair Admissions v. President and Fellows of Harvard College, arguing that group preferences are inconsistent with equality and individual rights and that they'd result in negative effects on students such as stigma, division, resentment, and dehumanization.

In July, Meg Smaker allied with FAIR to argue that her documentary "The UnRedacted", originally titled "Jihad Rehab", was being targeted since she was a white non-Muslim woman. FAIR also organized a Los Angeles screening of the film. The film followed four people who had been detained at Guantánamo Bay without trial for over a decade and who were presently detained in a rehabilitation center in Saudi Arabia. The film was condemned at its premiere at the Sundance film festival by various critics, including Muslim-American filmmakers, ex-Guantanomo detainees, and U.K. group CAGE, which advocates on behalf of those affected by the war on terror. The critics explicitly denied that their issues were related to her ethnicity, instead highlighting the ethics of interviewing men who'd been tortured and who could face retaliation from the Saudi government in addition to the original title and framing the men as guilty of what they'd been charged with without trial. Mohammed Al-Hamiri, who was featured in the film, told the Guardian he wasn't aware the film would be accessible internationally. Another man who was featured said he did not want to be but his concerns were discarded.

=== Medical issues ===
Dr. Carrie Mendoza leads the medicine chapter of FAIR, and has opposed race-conscious policies in health care, saying they can interfere with doctor-patient relationships.

In response to the omicron surge in December 2021, the New York State and City health departments issued guidance on the use of COVID-19 drug treatments and therapies that were then in limited supply. The state guidance specified "non-white race or Hispanic/Latino ethnicity should be considered a risk factor, as longstanding systemic health and social inequities have contributed to an increased risk of severe illness and death from COVID-19" and the city guidance contained similar language. FAIR filed a lawsuit asking the guidance to be blocked, claiming that it discriminated against white people and also members of minority racial and ethnic groups by labeling them as more prone to disease and therefore contributing to stigma and by subjecting them to experimental treatment. The National Medical Association, which represents African American physicians, filed an amicus brief strongly supporting the guidance.

== Reception ==
Laura Meckler on The Washington Post has described FAIR as conservative.

The Guardian describes FAIR as having "sprung up to spread the fear of critical race theory far and wide." Media Matters for America described the group as "deceptively named" and San Antonio Current columnist Kevin Sanchez described it as "horribly misnamed".

Former ACLU president Nadine Strossen has praised FAIR as an "important counter to an unfortunate tendency to see the world in binaries," arguing that the organization challenges the reductive framework of viewing people strictly as oppressors or victims.

Xusana Davis, Vermont's director of racial equity, called FAIR's use of rhetoric around positivity and inclusion a clever "minimization tactic", stating, "they insist on being positive and moving forward as a way to ignore or avoid the acknowledgment of harm and the consequential repair of harm."

=== By staff ===
In May 2022, several employees of FAIR wrote a letter to Weiss, appealing that FAIR had the ability to "take actual positions on urgent real-world issues that touch the lives of millions", while also maintaining that "Bartning is instead focused on advocating for an intellectualized concept of pro-humanism that, in practice, consists entirely of policing the language and tone of those who prioritize effective action over highly manicured messaging". The letter to Weiss also read, "Given the amount of reputation you have tethered to FAIR as an early founder [...] we feel an obligation to inform you about FAIR's severe mismanagement and the likelihood of collapse should Bartning be allowed to remain in charge". The operations manager of FAIR, in light of an early-2023 letter by another group of staff members demanding Bartning's resignation, lamented, "We became these tribal people. We're supposed to be the organization fighting against tribalism. And that's what we seemed to become." Commenting on the history of the organization including these episodes, Emma Green on The New Yorker in 2023 characterized FAIR as having "devolve[d] into tribalism".

== See also ==
- 2020s critical race theory controversies
