= Zeminar =

Annual event in Ireland for 15–20 year olds

- Zeminar logo
- Venue: Royal Dublin Society
- Locations: Dublin, Co Dublin
- Country: Ireland
- Inaugurated: October 2016; 10 years ago
- Most recent: 2019

Zeminar was a yearly event for people aged 15–20, members of Generation Z, about education, skills and well-being.

== History ==
Zeminar was founded by Dr Damien Clarke and Ian Fitzpatrick, and first took place in October 2016. The aim of the event is to provide young people, those part of Generation Z, with information on skills development, health and well-being and educational opportunities. Owing to the interests of the co-founders, the event has an emphasis on mental health issues that are prevalent amongst younger people. It is believed to be the world's only such event for this age group.

=== 2016 ===
In 2016 the event was attended by 14,000 students and young people, 850 teachers and 75 speakers and took place on 11 October. Speakers included Niall Breslin, Dr Rhona Mahony, Fr Peter McVerry, and Maria Walsh.

=== 2017 ===
In 2017 the event coincided with global mental health week, and took place on 10 to 12 October. Speakers included Paul and Gary O’Donovan, Blindboy of The Rubberbandits, Sinéad Burke, and author Eilís Barrett. In 2017 15,000 people attended the event.

=== 2018 ===
Speakers at the 2018 event included Panti Bliss, Kenneth Egan and Stella O'Malley. The event took place on 13–15 November.

=== 2019 ===
Zeminar has not been held since 2019.
