= Bayswater Support Group =

Advocacy group for gender-critical parents

The Bayswater Support Group (BSG) is a British advocacy group for parents who reject their transgender children's identities, founded in 2019. The group has been accused of promoting conversion practices and child abuse.

It has successfully pushed for educational policies which encourage schools to out trans pupils to their parents, and also advocated for a ban on social transition for transgender children. It also successfully lobbied the Crown Prosecution Services to remove protections for transgender victims of domestic abuse.

Many BSG members have been referred to social services in the UK because of potentially abusive conversion practices. Children of BSG members have described their parents engaging in emotional, financial and sexual abuse as part of their conversion attempts. They also say involvement with the group entrenched their parents transphobic views and contributed to radicalising them to the right on other issues.

In July 2024 The Bureau of Investigative Journalism released an investigation into the group, which investigated the group's influence on government policy and revealed details of their Discord server where members discussed putting their children through conversion therapy. It was shortlisted for the 2024 British Journalism Awards.

Since late 2025, BSG has begun to take legal action against public sector organisations it believes are promoting or facilitating children transitioning, including NHS England, and the BBC. Some of the group's lawfare has been funded by the far-right advocacy group CitizenGO.

== History ==
The Bayswater Support Group was founded in 2019. It operates as a peer support group, targeting parents sceptical of their children's transgender identity. Embedded within the wider gender-critical movement, it serves as a support group for parents concerned about their children's trans identities and has, with Transgender Trend, the Safe Schools Alliance, and Our Duty, constructed a narrative that transitions are an out-of-control threat to children.

In 2020, the BSG welcomed the Bell v Tavistock judgement that medical gender-affirming care for those under 16 would require the approval of a court.

In 2022, Bayswater signed an open letter against a planned conversion therapy ban due to fear it might criminalise "exploratory therapy".

=== Lobbying ===
In July 2024, The Bureau of Investigative Journalism (TBIJ) revealed Bayswater's influence over the Conservative government, based on posts from Bayswater's private Discord server over a 12-month period.

The investigation revealed BSG had a close relationship with then-Conservative MP Miriam Cates, who was able to influence the party's education policies to encourage schools to refuse to accommodate trans children and out them to their parents, and to prevent children learning about trans lives in relationships and sex education lessons.

TBIJ also showed that BSG group successfully lobbied the Crown Prosecution Service to water down their guidelines on anti-trans domestic abuse.

The group's Discord also showed that Nikki da Costa – an aide to Boris Johnson sent BSG a thank-you note for their support in opposing a ban on conversion therapy when he was prime minister.

Members of BSG have lodged many complaints about school LGBTQ+ clubs and resources, and sometimes succeeded in removing them. Members have accused teachers who support trans kids of grooming.

Wes Streeting has met with the group several times, and expressed sympathy with its members before the 2024 election. BSG was one of eight explicitly anti-transgender groups who were included in a targeted consultation by Streeting over his decision to announce an indefinite ban on the use of puberty blockers for trans minors.

=== Abuse allegations ===
TBIJ's investigation into Bayswater's Discord group also revealed that parents discussed trying to stop their children being trans by sending them to conversion therapists, isolating them children from sources of support and restricting their internet access, and destroying their possessions, including clothing, pride flags and phones.

Some members discussed preventing their children from accessing mental health support, including rape crisis support. The group suggests blocking the website for Childline, and the websites of several LGBTQ+ charities.

Several members of the Discord group admitted they had been reported to social services for suspected abuse. Parents of adult children frequently report being cut off or cutting off their children. Some have contacted the police or Salvation Army to track down estranged adult offspring.

Children of Bayswater members have described a range of abusive behaviours their parents engage in. These range from trying to ensure a teenager failed his A levels, to repeatedly showing up at a young adult's house to argue with them about their gender. Several children of Bayswater members say they think their parents' membership of BSG is partly responsible for a breakdown in the parent-child relationship, and their parents' increasing social isolation and extreme right-wing political views.

=== Lawfare ===
In 2025 BSG began sending legal letters to medical regulators and Wes Streeting, to protest a planned clinical trial of puberty blockers. The trial was announced following recommendations from the Cass Review, which claimed there wasn't enough evidence for the use of puberty blockers on trans kids. Bayswater argued that the trial was unlawful and failed go safeguard the safety and rights of the subjects.

On 6 February 2026, BSG, Keira Bell and James Esses brought a legal challenge against the health secretary High Court over the PATHWAYS clinical trial of puberty blockers. The trial was not able to begin recruiting participants while the case was ongoing.

In July 2026, the high court rejected BSG's legal challenge.

In November 2025, BSG made a complaint to Ofcom about the BBC, which it accuses of "celebrating the trans experience". BSG called this "a failure of impartiality and safeguarding".

In February 2026, Ofcom responded, saying it can only investigate complaints about specific programmes. This prompted BSG to threaten the regulator with legal action. As of August 2026, no legal action has been initiated.

In December 2025, London's child safeguarding body withdrew a training session on trans inclusion after a legal threat from BSG.

== Views ==
BSG claims that most youth who identity as trans do so to "mask complex causes of distress". Their website states they aim to address what they believe to be the root causes of trans identity to encourage the child to desist. They oppose social transition and argue parents must act as gender coaches and avoid affirming the child's gender identity.

BSG opposes gender-affirmative approaches and has said that "Vulnerable children and young adults must be told the truth about puberty blockers and cross-sex hormones: the evidence base is very weak, and there are known risks."

It has said: "By viewing gender exclusively as a ‘civil rights’ issue, children with complex mental health problems and trauma have been failed by adults who should have been protecting them". BSG argues: "Unlike sexual orientation, a trans identity is linked with likely medicalisation and high rates of comorbidities", calling it a safeguarding failure not to try and figure out what leads kids to be transgender.

== See also ==
- Anti-transgender movement in the United Kingdom
- Memorandum of Understanding on Conversion Therapy
- LGBTQ rights in the United Kingdom
- Genspect
- Society for Evidence-Based Gender Medicine
- Therapy First
