= Therapy First =

Group promoting conversion therapy

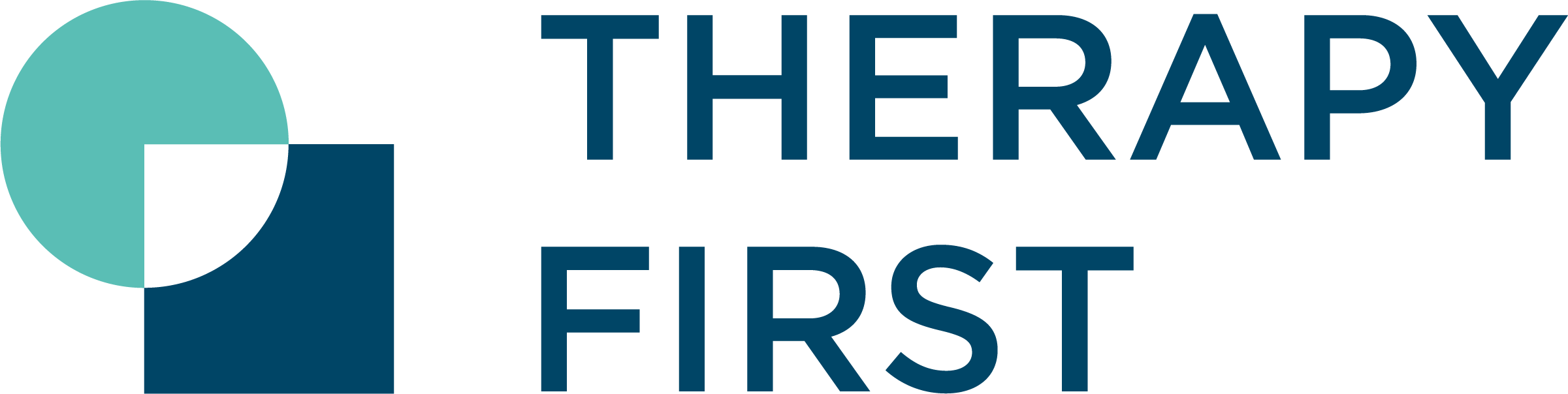
- Established: June 2021; 5 years ago
- Affiliations: Society for Evidence-Based Gender Medicine, Genspect
- Website: www.therapyfirst.org
- Formerly called: Gender Exploratory Therapy Association (GETA)

Therapy First, formerly known as GETA, is an organization that advocates gender exploratory therapy, a form of conversion therapy. Originally named the Gender Exploratory Therapy Association, Therapy First was established in 2021 by the Society for Evidence-Based Gender Medicine (SEGM) and Genspect.

== History ==
GETA was formed in June 2021 by four members of the Society for Evidence-Based Gender Medicine, Sasha Ayad, Roberto D'Angelo, Stella O'Malley, and Lisa Marchiano, as well as Genspect advisor Joseph Burgo. All of GETA's key people are advisors to the gender-critical organization Genspect. The Southern Poverty Law Center described Genspect, SEGM, and GETA as the strongest triad within the "anti-LGBT pseudoscience network", sharing over two dozen personnel connections.

Board member Dwight Panozzo is a therapist who maintains a private practice in New Jersey and teaches at the New York University Silver School of Social Work, where a student stated he discussed his practice while teaching. In 2021, he stated hatred towards the trans community "really needs our focus at this point", but in 2024 told the website "Beyond Trans" that stated that "I also once believed that trans was a thing to be protected and never questioned. In my own case it was a matter of respect and being a gay male ally, I have learned so much more since those days." He has also referenced the anti-trans conspiracy theory that transgender women are motivated to transition by autogynephilia, the thought of being sexually attracted to the idea of themselves as women.

In 2022, GETA published a guide on gender exploratory therapy. After the World Professional Association for Transgender Health (WPATH) published the 8th edition of its Standards of Care, Burgo launched an initiative called "Beyond WPATH", calling WPATH discredited and stating the signatories, including representatives from GETA, Transgender Trend, the American College of Pediatricians, and Moms for Liberty, were opposed to "the affirmative approach".

In June 2022, U.S. president Joe Biden released an executive order calling for the elimination of conversion therapy for LGBTQ2S+ youth. Shortly afterwards, Lisa Marchiano spoke to The Economist opposing the order two weeks later, stating a conversion therapy ban could cause a "chilling effect" on her organization. In September 2022, GETA members submitted a comment opposing the U.S. Department of Education guidance protecting gender identity under Title IX, arguing it would lead to mandatory social transitioning of children without parental consent. In 2023, members filed a petition with the Food and Drug Administration calling on them to end prescriptions of puberty blockers to trans children.

In late 2023, GETA officially changed its name to Therapy First. A source close to the organization told Washington Square News that the name change was due to negative press they had received.

== Views ==
Therapy First labels social transition, the act of adopting a new name, pronouns, or gender expression, and medical transition as "risky". The organization argues psychotherapy "should be the first-line treatment for all cases of gender dysphoria" and transition related medical care for youth "should be avoided if possible". Therapy First's guide for parents of trans youth, written by board member Lisa Marchiano, discourages parents and guardians from allowing their children "too much power" after coming out and details ways to avoid using their child's chosen name and pronouns.

The organization denies that it supports conversion therapy. Panozzo's lawyer, Ilya Shapiro, who has represented the Alliance Defending Freedom, said claims they supported conversion therapy "would be false and defamatory". The membership application for the organization asks prospective members "Some people believe that exploratory therapy is equivalent to conversion therapy. What do you think about this?"

In a Washington Post op-ed, Paul Garcia-Ryan, a detransitioner and the board president of Therapy First, stated that the organization has a membership of over 300 clinicians across 36 states and 14 countries. In Ryan's opinion, the organization advocates for quality mental health care for gender-dysphoric youth and does not practice conversion therapy. Ryan claims the organization has faced false accusations of affiliations with the religious right and practicing conversion therapy, as well as silencing and intimidation attempts. Ryan does not believe people under the age of 25 should be allowed to transition, socially or medically, without undergoing exploratory therapy first.

== Gender exploratory therapy ==
Gender exploratory therapy emerged recently as a non-affirmative approach to transgender youth. The founders of the approach argue transgender identities are caused by factors such as social contagion, homophobia, sexual trauma, and autism. The approach requires youth complete mandatory "extended" psychotherapy aimed at identifying possible causes of gender identity or trans identity before any transition process. They characterize this approach as neither conversion nor affirmation.

They argue that the gender-affirming approach, which does not view transgender identities as pathological, is a political agenda.

The Substance Abuse and Mental Health Services Administration issued a report noting that "approaches that discourage youth from identifying as transgender or gender-diverse, and/or from expressing their gender identity" are "harmful and never appropriate" but sometimes "misleadingly" labelled as "exploratory therapy". Gender exploratory therapy is considered by experts to be a form of conversion therapy.

== Reception ==
The American College of Pediatricians, a socially conservative advocacy group, have cited numerous studies by GETA members to argue conversion therapies are necessary to maintain the "biological integrity" of trans and gender nonconforming people. The Alliance for Therapeutic Choice and Scientific Integrity, a conversion therapy group formerly called the National Association for Research and Therapy of Homosexuality, hosted a conference where board member Michelle Cretella linked the approaches, stating "It truly is very similar to how the Alliance has always approached unwanted SSA [same-sex attraction]" and "you approach it as 'change therapy'—or, even less triggering, 'exploratory therapy'."

Erin Reed, a researcher who has studied gender exploratory therapy and anti-trans organizations, has compared them to crisis pregnancy centers which steer pregnant people away from abortions, stating GETA's strategy is to sound cautious and helpful while promoting the view people should live their lives as their birth assigned gender. The Southern Poverty Law Center has described GETA as part of an "anti-LGBT pseudoscience network".

In 2024, leaders of the New York University Silver School of Social Work LGBTQ+ affinity group Pride in Practice called for Panazzo's termination from the school upon learning of his connection to Therapy First. The petition was taken down following pressure from their faculty sponsor and administrators and the students said they were told an investigation would take place. A spokesperson for the school said they could not confirm or deny the existence of any current investigations, but added Panazzo's private practice is outside their jurisdiction so they would not be launching an investigation or taking adverse employment action.

Human rights activist and professor at Harvard University Timothy McCarthy stated the tactics employed by organizations like Therapy First are part of a larger history of spreading misinformation about trans identity and that professors at universities found to be members should be stripped of their titles.

== See also ==
- 21st-century anti-trans movement in the United Kingdom
- 2020s anti-LGBTQ movement in the United States
- History of conversion therapy
- Bayswater Support Group
