= Stella O'Malley =

Irish psychotherapist and author

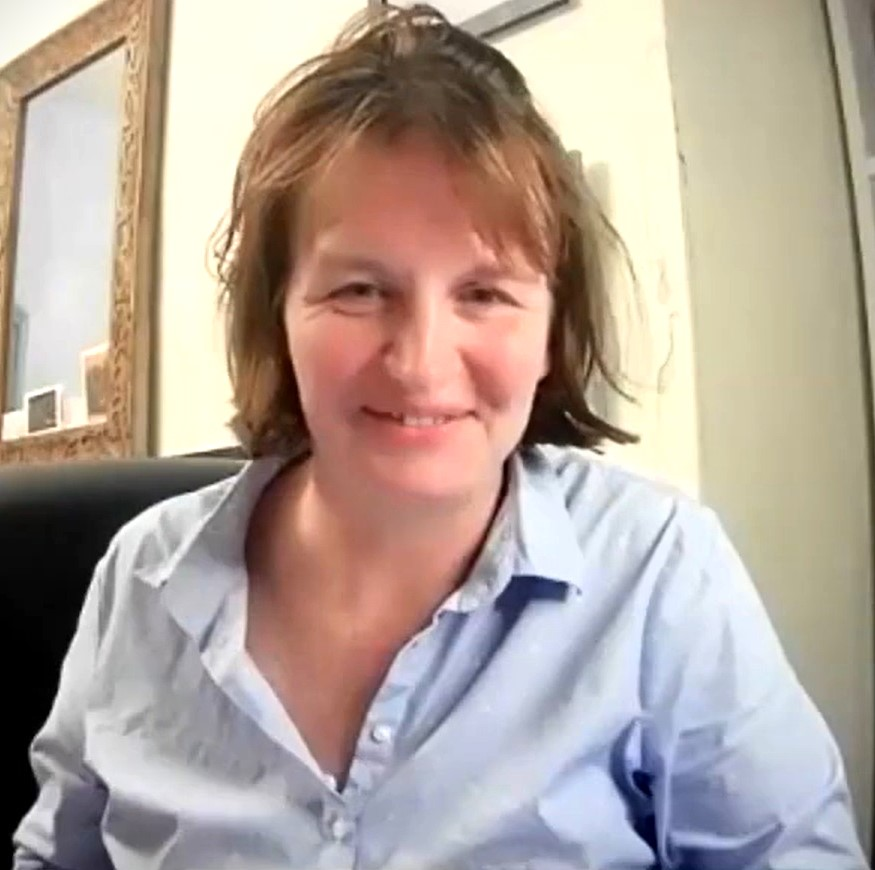
- O'Malley in 2024
- Born: 1973 or 1974 (age 51–52); Dublin, Ireland
- Occupations: Psychotherapist and author
- Known for: Psychotherapy and mental health
- Website: www.stellaomalley.com

Stella O'Malley is an Irish psychotherapist, author, and anti-transgender activist. She is a regular contributor to Irish national newspapers, podcasts, and TV. She made a documentary about gender dysphoria in children for Channel 4, and is the founder of Genspect, a self-described gender critical organisation opposed to gender affirming care.

== Early life ==
O'Malley is the third child in a family of four children, with one older sister and brother, and one younger brother.

O'Malley grew up in Dublin in the late 1970s. In her documentary Trans Kids: It's Time to Talk she states that from the ages of 4 to 13 or 14, she insisted that she was a boy, that as puberty developed she felt there was no other option and stopped telling people she was a boy, and at 16 she became comfortable with herself as a woman. She believes that if she had been born 35 years later she would have insisted she was a trans boy and transitioned.

== Published works ==
=== Books ===
O'Malley has written several books, four of which were on the Irish non-fiction paperback best sellers list.

- O'Malley, Stella (2015). Cotton Wool Kids. Mercier Press. ISBN 9781781173206.
- O'Malley, Stella (2017). Bully-Proof Kids. Gill Books. ISBN 9780717175420.
- O'Malley, Stella (2019). Fragile. Gill Books. ISBN 9780717183227.
- O'Malley, Stella (2023). What your teen is trying to tell you. Gill Books. ISBN 9780717196050.
- When Kids Say They're Trans: A Guide for Thoughtful Parents - Stella O'Malley, Sasha Ayad, and Lisa Marchiano, Pitchstone Publishing (31 October 2023), ISBN 978-1634312486

=== Film ===
In 2018 her Channel 4 documentary Trans Kids: It's Time To Talk aired. The documentary addressed transgender children and their gender dysphoria, expressing concerns that too many children were transitioning and doing so too young. In the documentary, she interviewed transgender children and adults as well as a detransitioned woman, all of whom said they didn't regret their decision to medically transition. Transgender groups and charities she approached had refused to speak to her; she said they accused her of questioning whether transgender children exist. She was criticised for interviewing James Caspian and "trans-critical" feminists who oppose the right of transgender people to self-identify, one of whom asserted there is no scientific evidence anyone is "born in the wrong body". In the film, O'Malley states that she had called herself a boy until puberty, which she retroactively considers gender dysphoria and believes would have led her to transition if born later, but felt comfortable as a girl after puberty.

Some critics praised the documentary, others criticised it for uneven coverage, asking if children and adolescents are being "groomed" into believing they're trans, and O'Malley's conclusion that transgender children "are lost and are being led". Dr Helen Webberley, a UK based GP and gender specialist who had declined to participate in the film, criticised it for not including any trans adults who had transitioned as children. Sarah Carson concluded in her review that "a film like this that tries to prove that to be transgender can be "a phase" – with few statistics and not enough concrete evidence – could do more harm than good".

=== TV ===
She has been the resident psychotherapist for two TV programmes, Raised by the Village, on Irish TV channel RTÉ1, and on a TG4 parenting show in Irish, Cad Faoi Na Tuismitheoirí.

=== Podcasts ===
- Lisa Marchiano; Stella O’Malley (September 2019). "Secrets of the Mother World" (Podcast).
- Sasha Ayad; Stella O’Malley (December 2020). "Gender: A Wider Lens" (Podcast). Captivate.fm.

== Exploratory therapy, Genspect and SEGM ==
O'Malley advocates for "exploratory therapy" in response to gender dysphoria and has written and testified about how some conversion therapy bills risk limiting access to exploratory therapy. On 9 August 2021, O'Malley co-authored an opinion letter titled "Bill to ban conversion therapy poses problems for therapists" alongside psychologist Jacky Grainer and GP Madeleine Ní Dhailigh for the Irish Times in reference to the Prohibition of Conversion Therapies Bill 2018. In the letter, she criticized the inclusion of "suppression of gender identity" in the bill's definition of conversion therapy. The Union of Students in Ireland subsequently announced that it was boycotting the Irish Times until it apologised for the article. The Trans Writers Union also announced a boycott of the paper due to what they characterised as advocating conversion therapy and a pattern of transphobic behavior. In an interview with O'Malley in Undark Magazine concerning transgender treatment, published in April 2022, O'Malley stated that she opposes all medical treatment for gender dysphoria for teens under 18, saying that 'significant harm is done by smoothing the way towards medical treatment.'

In February 2020, O'Malley tweeted "I hate the phrase gender critical but I am making a list! A large number of people contact me seeking help and I don't know enough Irish therapists who can provide compassionate and nuanced therapy." This was described as compiling a list of Irish gender critical therapists, which some Twitter users equated with conversion therapy.

In June 2021, O'Malley founded Genspect. Genspect has supported numerous legal complaints against clinicians and has supported parents trying to prevent children from socially transitioning at school without full parental support. Genspect also "stands in full solidarity" with Our Duty, an organisation that advocates an immediate moratorium on gender-affirming healthcare for anyone under 25 and public funding for gender-affirming healthcare at any age. The group recommends talk therapies where the stated goal of any treatment regimen must be "swift desistance from transgender ideation". Genspect has advised parents against using trans children's chosen names and pronouns, recommended that schools ban "tucking" and "binding", as well as use "biologically accurate language in all cases" and not punish students for misgendering other students. Genspect also stated that "acceptance of the reality of their biological sex" should be the first treatment for gender variant children. Jenn Burleton, Executive Director of TransActive, described Genspect as "an anti-trans, 'gender critical' organization ideologically affiliated with TERFism, Rapid Onset Gender Dysphoria, and Alliance Defending Freedom".

O'Malley is a clinical advisor to the Society for Evidence-Based Gender Medicine (SEGM). She also helped found the International Association of Therapists for Desisters and Detransitioners (IATDD) and the Gender Dysphoria Support Network (GDSN) in 2020.

In March 2022, O'Malley was slated to speak at an NHS conference on gender dysphoria. The event was cancelled following complaints by NHS whistleblowers, researchers, and trans rights activists, who accused a majority of the speakers as having a "record of extreme prejudice towards trans people". Open Democracy said the speakers had "close links to proponents of anti-trans conversion therapies".

On 6 May 2022, Gay Community News (Dublin) published an article about concerns people raised over O'Malley being invited to address an Education and Training Boards Ireland (ETBI) conference on managing gender issues in schools. In the article, O'Malley was characterised as an anti-trans conversion therapy advocate whose views were misinformation. On 10 May 2022, TD Mick Barry raised issue with O'Malley's invitation to the conference, referring to a Twitter Spaces conversation in which she stated "I don't think you need to give empathy at all, none, zero. I think I should because I'm trying to understand them" when asked why women should have sympathy for who they describe as autogynephiles. LGBTQIA+ activist Izzy Kamikaze also shared link to the released audio. O'Malley has sent a legal letter to Barry accusing him of defamation and sent similar language to Kamikaze for sharing the link.

In 2022, O'Malley appeared in a video produced by the Ickonic film company, which is largely owned by antisemitic conspiracy theorist David Icke.

In August 2025, the Irish Association for Counseling and Psychotherapy published a piece in which they criticised O'Malley and Genspect as holding an "anti-trans stance" and wanting to marginalise trans people, saying that psychotherapists needed to be alert to disinformation. In response, O'Malley initiated a legal case against them and the writer of the article for defamation.

== Personal life ==
O’Malley lives in Birr, County Offaly with her husband and two children.
