= Genspect =

Organization opposing transgender rights

- Formation: June 2021; 5 years ago
- Founder: Stella O'Malley
- Affiliations: Society for Evidence-Based Gender Medicine
- Website: genspect.org

Genspect is an international gender-critical anti-trans advocacy group founded in June 2021 by psychotherapist Stella O'Malley. Genspect opposes gender-affirming care, as well as social and medical transition for transgender people. Genspect opposes allowing transgender people under 25 years old to transition, and opposes laws that would ban conversion therapy on the basis of gender identity. Genspect also endorses the unproven concept of rapid-onset gender dysphoria (ROGD), which proposes a subclass of gender dysphoria caused by peer influence and social contagion. ROGD has been rejected by major medical organisations due to its lack of evidence and likelihood to cause harm by stigmatizing gender-affirming care.

Genspect's positions contradict major medical organizations such as the World Professional Association for Transgender Health (WPATH), the Endocrine Society, the American Psychiatric Association, American Psychological Association, and the American Academy of Pediatrics, the latter of which states "robust evidence demonstrates that access to gender-affirming care decreases risk of suicidal ideations, improves mental health, and improves the overall health and well-being of transgender and gender-diverse youth".

Genspect is closely affiliated with the Society for Evidence-Based Gender Medicine (SEGM): Seven advisors for SEGM are on Genspect's team or advisors, including founder O'Malley. Genspect consists of parents, educators, counsellors, clinicians, and well-known detransitioners. The Southern Poverty Law Center has designated Genspect and SEGM as anti-LGBTQ hate groups since 2023.

== Advocacy and positions ==
=== Transgender youth ===
In June 2021, the conservative British newspaper The Daily Telegraph featured an article marking the launch of Genspect. Stella O'Malley said parents were shocked that gender-questioning children were prescribed drugs "within weeks" of attending a clinic. The NHS disputed the claim, saying access to gender-affirming care was normally a "lengthy process". O'Malley stated "We think that the affirmative approach is too narrow and it is not taking into account co-morbidities, such as autism, or trauma". At the launch, a mother spoke to the Telegraph, claiming that her transgender daughter was "groomed" at school and online into taking hormone treatment. Her daughter had come out to her as a trans girl at 14 years old, asked for puberty blockers at 16, which she refused, and was prescribed hormones from the NHS at 19.

In August 2021, they intervened in a case against the school district in the town of Rhondda Cynon Taf in South Wales for using a student's preferred pronouns in school without the parent's knowledge. Genspect has publicly supported numerous legal complaints against clinicians and has supported parents in efforts to prevent students socially transitioning at school against parent's wishes. Genspect has advised parents and schools against using transgender children's chosen names and pronouns and recommended schools ban tucking and chest binding.

Genspect has also campaigned against access to gender transition for those under age 25. On the subject of gender-affirming care for people over 25, Genspect's vice director, Alasdair Gunn claimed that their focus on youth transition is a political strategy to reach left-leaning voters in order to eventually push for restrictions on transitioning for people of all ages. Gunn clarified that, "None of us would ever recommend transition for anyone. On those over 25 we say little, because it's not in YOUR interests to mention this. We have to break through to the policymakers who are left of center, and the way to do that is to focus relentlessly on the problem of transition for under 25s."

Genspect promoted misinformation about Boston Children's Hospital, claiming they perform vaginoplasties on minors. However, no such surgeries were performed. Genspect did not apologize, instead claiming that adolescence lasts until 25 years old, so therefore the hospital was performing surgeries on "adolescents".

In February 2023, Genspect, the Catholic Secondary School Parents Association, the Association of Patrons and Trustees of Catholic Schools, and the Irish Education Alliance opposed a new Social Personal and Health Education curriculum which is being finalized by the National Council for Curriculum and Assessment. The curricula would be taught over three years for 12-15 year olds and address gender identity, gender expression, and sexual orientation. Genspect said the course promoted a "narrow-minded gender affirmative approach and assumes that everyone – students, parents and school staff – believes in the gender identity belief system". The Transgender Equality Network of Ireland, BeLonG2 Youth Services, the youth group Foróige, and the Children's Rights Alliance welcomed the changes but stated that the course should be updated to include discussion of appropriate pronouns and the term "biological sex" replaced with "sex assigned at birth".

=== Bans on gender-affirming care ===
In July 2021, Genspect intervened in a court case in Arizona in defense of the state's ban on Medicaid coverage for transgender healthcare.

Genspect was reported as campaigning against California's Senate Bill 107 in August 2022, which would make the state a refuge for transgender children and families fleeing persecution in other states.

On 21 August, a policy by the Florida board of medicine ended Medicaid coverage for transgender healthcare at any age, despite gender-affirming care being recommended by the American Medical Association, the American Academy of Pediatrics, the American Psychiatric Association, and other major medical organizations. Dr. Patrick Hunter on the board retweeted Genspect's letter to the American Academy of Pediatrics. The board was described by the Florida Phoenix as "stacked with anti-trans doctors, some of whom are affiliated with anti-trans fringe movements such as Genspect and the Society for Evidence-Based Gender Medicine."

Genspect, along with other gender critical organizations in Europe including Cry For Recognition, Kirjo, Ypomini, Transteens Sorge Berechtigt, Genitori (De)generi, GenderIdentity Challenge Norway and GenderIdentity Challenge Sweden signed a petition created by the AMANDA Association which called for the European Union to ban all medical transition for minors as a response to what they called "rapid-onset gender dysphoria", which is not recognized as a valid mental health diagnosis by any major professional association.

In 2023, leaked chat logs from a community Discord server operated by Genspect, revealed founder Stella O'Malley saying that she believes porn causes children to identify as trans, and that her ultimate goal is to completely end all gender transitions for minors with no exceptions.

=== Conversion therapy ===
Genspect testified against New Zealand's Conversion Practices Prohibition Legislation Act 2022, arguing it should not include banning conversion therapy practices on the basis of gender identity. Founder Stella O'Malley advocates for "exploratory therapy" in support of gender dysphoria and has written and testified about how some conversion therapy bills also risk limiting access to exploratory therapy.

On 9 August 2021, O'Malley co-authored an opinion letter titled "Bill to ban conversion therapy poses problems for therapists" alongside psychologist Jacky Grainer and GP Madeleine Ní Dhailigh for The Irish Times in reference to the Prohibition of Conversion Therapies Bill 2018. In the letter, she criticized the inclusion of "suppression of gender identity" in the bill's definition of conversion therapy. The Union of Students in Ireland subsequently announced that it was boycotting The Irish Times until it apologised for the article. The Trans Writers Union, with 1,400 signatories, and Trinity News also announced a boycott of the paper due to what they characterized as advocating conversion therapy and a pattern of transphobic behavior.

Science-Based Medicine stated "exploratory therapy" is "palatable language" for conversion therapy, noting a legal strategy proposed by Richard Green in 2017 which advocated circumventing bans on "gender-conversion psychotherapies" by labeling them "gender identity exploration or development". The WPATH Standards of Care 8 encourage healthy exploration of gender and notes attempts to force gender-diverse youth to "explore their gender" when not requested by the patient "can be experienced as pathologizing, intrusive and/or cisnormative".

After the Cass Review was published, O'Malley expressed concern that a bill banning conversion therapy proposed by the UK Labour Party risked criminalising the "very therapy that Cass is saying should be prioritised".

A 2026 report by Amnesty International described Genspect as engaging in conversion practices. Genspect objected that the suggestion they engaged in conversion therapy was false, and also very serious, and they requested Amnesty permanently withdraw the report and apologise, reserving their right to bring a legal case should this not happen. On 31 July, Amnesty issued a statement, permanently withdrawing this report and another, and aplogising for characterising gender-critical groups as anti-rights.

=== Rapid-onset gender dysphoria ===
In November 2021, Genspect organised the first online meeting on the theory of rapid-onset gender dysphoria (ROGD), featuring Lisa Littman, who originated the theory and is a clinical advisor to Genspect, David Bell, and Stella O'Malley. ROGD has never been recognized as a valid medical diagnosis by any major professional institution, has been referenced in legislation to limit the rights of transgender adolescents, and is opposed by the World Professional Association for Transgender Health (WPATH), the American Psychiatric Association, and the American Psychological Association, among other medical organizations, due to a lack of reputable scientific evidence and major surveying issues for the concept.

=== Detransition ===
In July 2021, responding to an editorial in The Lancet Child & Adolescent Health which quoted a statistic that 1% of people who transition experience regret, Genspect described the statistic as "outdated" given the large rise in children seeking to transition.

On 12 March 2022, Genspect held a Detrans Awareness Day.

=== Recognition of gender identity ===
In January 2022, Genspect opposed plans in Scotland to allow changes to legal gender after three months of living in a new gender. Stella O'Malley, founder and executive director of Genspect, said the proposed law was a "terrible error" and predicted that it may cause an increase in people regretting transition.

=== Drag Queen Story Hour ===
In August 2022, Genspect and the Family Education Trust signed a letter criticizing Drag Queen Story Hours and calling for them to be stopped, saying it was "age-inappropriate" for "men dressed as grotesque versions of women" to read stories to primary school children.

=== Opposition to medical guidelines on gender-affirming care ===
In March 2022, Julia Mason, a board member of SEGM who also works with Genspect, proposed Resolution 27 along with four other members of the American Academy of Pediatrics (AAP), stating the AAP should reconsider hormone therapy as a first line of treatment and called for an evidence review to update AAP's 2018 policy statement on gender affirmative care. The resolution wasn't passed. Genspect and the physicians who proposed the resolution claimed that they were being sidelined and that the AAP changed its processes to block discussion of the resolution.

In response, the AAP said they mischaracterized the current standards of care, which call for intake and collaboration between clinicians and mental health professionals. They also said that the process worked normally and that Resolution 27 did not pass because it received no co-sponsorship and the majority of AAP members did not agree with the resolution. The AAP stated the guidelines were already under review as part of a routine procedure and that "there is strong consensus among the most prominent medical organizations worldwide that evidence-based, gender-affirming care for transgender children and adolescents is medically necessary and appropriate."

In July 2022, Genspect asked the AAP for a "non-partisan and systematic review of evidence" for its 2018 guidance of gender-affirming care for children questioning their gender, adding that "Many of our children have received this care and are anything but thriving." The APP said it is updating its statement "Providing affirmative clinical care", adding that "Robust evidence demonstrates that access to gender-affirming care decreases risk of suicidal ideations, improves mental health, and improves the overall health and well-being of transgender and gender-diverse youth."

In September, the World Professional Association for Transgender Health (WPATH) published the eighth edition of its standards for care (SOC8). Genspect opposed the guidelines, claiming they encouraged clinicians to alienate parents because the SOC 8 stated "We recommend when gender-affirming medical or surgical treatments are indicated for adolescents, health care professionals working with transgender and gender diverse adolescents involve parent(s)/guardian(s) in the assessment and treatment process, unless their involvement is determined to be harmful to the adolescent or not feasible." In response to a chapter on eunuchs who "may seek castration to better align their bodies with their gender identity", O'Malley warned of "a new sacred ideology emerging that you cannot criticise" and, drawing a comparison with the Catholic Church, said "this will inevitably attract some bad-faith actors".

In Killarney in April 2023, Genspect and the European Professional Association of Transgender Health (Epath) held conferences with differing views on transgender health care. Speakers at the Genspect conference included detransitioners, sexologist Ken Zucker, researcher Maya Forstater, and author Helen Joyce. Speakers at the Epath conference included Jon Arcelus, co-chair of WPATH's SOC8.

=== Booklets ===
Genspect has published 9 booklets addressed to parents, schools, universities, psychotherapists, and pediatricians, which promote an approach inconsistent with the recognized standards, paradigms, and models of the scientific communities referenced. They selectively and strategically rely on publications in magazines without peer review and essays written by experts in science communication not generally involved in scientific research. These publications recommend parents not use their children's chosen names and pronouns, the use of gendered language based on sex instead of gender, and the maintenance of bathrooms separated based on sex instead of gender, among other recommendations.

=== Re-pathologization campaign ===
In a 2025 press release, Genspect "strongly urge[d] the recognition of transgender identification as a pathological condition characterized by an Extreme Overvalued Belief". According to Evan Urquhart, the press release "echoes the extreme, far-right rhetoric that seeks to conflate trans rights advocacy with terrorism, as it does the actions of everyone else viewed as an enemy".

== Affiliations ==
Genspect is closely affiliated with the Society for Evidence-Based Gender Medicine (SEGM): Julia Mason, Marcus Evans, Roberto D'Angelo, Sasha Ayad, Stella O'Malley, Lisa Marchiano, and Avi Ring are advisors for SEGM and are on Genspect's team or advisors. Trans Safety Network described SEGM as "an anti-trans psychiatric and sociological think tank" and fringe group and reported that most of SEGM's funding came in donations greater than $10,000.

In response to attempts by legislators in Alabama and Texas to ban gender affirming care for minors a report was written by a law professor and six physicians and psychologists who work with trans children and teenagers. These researchers noted that SEGM, which was cited by Texas Attorney General Ken Paxton, is "biased" and "not a recognized scientific association". The report also stated "The core members of SEGM frequently serve together on the boards of other organizations that oppose gender-affirming treatment and, like SEGM, feature biased and unscientific content. These include Genspect, Gender Identity Challenge (GENID), Gender Health Query, Rethink Identity Medicine Ethics, Sex Matters, Gender Exploratory Therapy Team, Gender Dysphoria Working Group, and the Institute for Comprehensive Gender Dysphoria Research." Lisa Littman, who created the rapid-onset gender dysphoria hypothesis, is an advisor to Genspect and president of the Institute for Comprehensive Gender Dysphoria Research, which includes other members of Genspect including Stella O'Malley.

Genspect has worked with right-wing anti-LGBT groups such as the Alliance Defending Freedom, which is classified by the SPLC as a hate group, and "stands in full solidarity" with Our Duty, a proponent of anti-trans conversion therapy which has called for an "immediate moratorium" on anyone under 25 transitioning as well as public funding for transition at any age, and recommended "swift desistance from transgender ideation" as the "stated goal of any treatment regime" for transgender youth.

Genspect members and advisors were criticized for appearing in a documentary produced by David Icke, who is known for antisemitism and conspiracy theories. Stella O'Malley, Marcus Evans, Stephanie Davies-Arai of Transgender Trend, and detransitioner Ritchie Herron appeared in the documentary.

Guides published by Genspect have been promoted by the anti-trans Italian group Genitori De Gender.

== Reception ==
LGBTQ Nation says that though "the group claims that it is welcoming to transgender people", "it is broadly opposed to gender-affirming care for youth". Jenn Burleton, executive director of the TransActive Gender Center Project, told the Nation that Genspect is "an anti-trans, 'gender critical' organization ideologically affiliated with TERFism, ROGD [Rapid Onset Gender Dysphoria], and Alliance Defending Freedom". Them describes the organization as "an advocacy group that is known for its anti-trans stances" and stated they have "gone on the record as referring to 18-25 year olds as 'adolescents', and claiming that this bracket should also be denied gender-affirmative care, and subjected to conversion therapy, despite being legal adults in the wake of this event. This suggests once again that their goal is to expand bans from simply minors to everyone under 25". Gay Community News describes Genspect as "an organization that supports parents who don't affirm their transgender children, espousing the pseudoscientific 'condition' known as Rapid Onset Gender Dysphoria (ROGD), condemned by WPATH, the American Psychiatric Association and American Psychological Association".

The Florida Phoenix described Genspect as "an anti-trans fringe group...which claims many more people detransition than is factual". Valigia Blu described Genspect as "emblematic" of a form of "anti-trans activism [which] uses scientific language as a source of self-legitimation and as a tool for protesting institutions, organizations and more generally the scientific community and authorities (and above all their internal evaluation and validation methods)". Jamie Bowman, an educator and advocate for families of transgender youth, stated Genspect uses "propaganda and scare-tactics to convince parents to not support their children".

In response to the Oklahoma Millstone Act, which bans gender-affirming care for those under 26 and makes providing or having provided it a felony, Alejandra Caraballo stated "we have been warning everyone that the inevitable goal of the anti trans movement was to ban all gender affirming care and effectively criminalize trans-people from existing. Groups like Genspect have been laying the groundwork for this".

The Hill stated "efforts to restrict transgender adults' access to health care lean heavily on claims from so-called "gender-critical" organizations that young people should not be recognized as adults before they turn 25, when the human brain is believed to reach full maturity", linking to Genspect as an example.

The Sunday Times and The Times described it as an organization that advocates for the parents of gender-questioning children. The Daily Telegraph describes Genspect as a group supporting parents troubled by the gender-related medical treatment received by their children. The Economist describes the organization as "an international group of clinicians and parents".

In June 2024, the Southern Poverty Law Center released their annual 2023 report and designated Genspect and SEGM as anti-LGBTQ hate groups, saying that they propagate "anti-LGBTQ+ pseudoscience, especially regarding transgender healthcare".

=== Boycott over inclusion in the Irish Times ===
Founder Stella O'Malley co-authored a letter which criticized the inclusion of "suppression of gender identity" in the Irish Prohibition of Conversion Therapies Bill 2018. The Union of Students in Ireland subsequently announced that it was boycotting The Irish Times until it apologised for the article. The Trans Writers Union, with 1,400 signatories, and Trinity News also announced a boycott of the paper due to what they characterised as advocating conversion therapy and a pattern of transphobic behavior.

=== Medical community ===
In response to attempts by legislators in Alabama and Texas to ban gender affirming care for minors a report was written by a law professor and six physicians and psychologists who work with trans children and teenagers. These researchers described Genspect as part of a small group of "anti-trans activists." appearing in multiple organizations who "oppose gender-affirming treatment and, like [the Society for Evidence-Based Gender Medicine], feature biased and unscientific content."

Medscape Medical News describes Genspect as "a parent-based organization that seeks to put the brakes on medical transitions for children and adolescents," noting they oppose "the gender-affirming care model supported by the World Professional Association for Transgender Health, the American Medical Association, the American Academy of Pediatrics, and other medical groups." MedPage Today stated that "while clinicians agree that more healthcare options and further studies are needed to better support transgender youth, there is a concern that groups like Genspect, which aim to challenge the current approach to youth transgender care, are fueling a political debate that will erode access to transgender medicine." AAP President Moira Szilagyi "condemned efforts from state legislatures and other groups to restrict gender-affirming care, stating that they have a 'chilling effect' on access to care for this population". Science-Based Medicine described Genspect as "an anti-trans gender critical (GC) organization" closely affiliated with SEGM, and stated they "both regularly peddle anti-trans pseudoscience".

In July 2022, LGBT groups, scientific and medical professionals, and public figures signed an open letter to the Polish Society for Psychodynamic Psychotherapy criticizing their invitation of Marcus and Susan Evans to speak at a conference; Marcus is an advisor to Genspect and they are both advisors to SEGM. The letter stated "according to an analysis by journalists from the organization Health Liberation Now, Genspect is closely related to a significant number of other entities opposing "gender ideology" and promoting conversion therapy for LGBT people" and that the Evans' support conversion therapy. The Polish Sexological Society then published a statement condemning their invitation as well.

In December 2022, Trans Safety Network found that the British National Health Service (NHS) had promoted training materials from conversion therapy promoters, including Genspect, which called it "gender exploratory therapy".

==== Inclusion in NHS conference ====
In March 2022, O'Malley would have appeared at an NHS conference on gender dysphoria at Great Ormond Street Hospital, alongside paediatrician Hilary Cass, journalist Helen Joyce, CEO of Mermaids Susie Green, and Genspect advisors Stephanie Davies-Arai, the founder of Transgender Trend, and Lisa Littman. The event was cancelled following complaints by NHS whistleblowers, researchers, and transgender rights activists, who accused a majority of the speakers as having a "record of extreme prejudice towards trans people". In response to criticism of the event, Genspect said it "would have centred on moderate and well-informed voices at a pivotal moment in the UK, as the interim Cass Report seeks to establish a more coherent treatment model for young people who are questioning their gender."

OpenDemocracy wrote an article in response to the cancelled NHS event which describes Genspect as "an international alliance of so-called 'gender-critical' parents, counsellors, educators and activists" that work with proponents of anti-trans conversion therapy, which is the pseudo-scientific practice of attempting to change sexual orientation or gender identity. An NHS worker who spoke to Open Democracy stated some speakers "had no experience looking after trans kids" and "were very publicly connected to anti-trans advocacy or promoted discredited theories". Guides produced by Genspect say there is "no evidence showing that social or medical transition reduces the risk of suicide among young people with gender dysphoria". OpenDemocracy pointed out the claim was false with published evidence to the contrary.

=== Coverage in The New York Times ===
On 15 June 2022, The New York Times interviewed parents from Genspect who defined the rise in transgender-identified children as a "gender cult" and mass craze, "suggesting that exposure to transgender kids, education about trans people, and trans ideas on the internet could spread transness to others". Some parents from Genspect stated transgender people should not be able to transition until the age of 25. The article also referenced a newsletter by an anonymous Genspect parent titled "It's Strategy People!" about how the organisation gets its perspective into the media by purposefully not referring to transgender children as "mentally ill" or "deluded".

The Texas Observer criticized the article, stating "Since its publication, transgender-rights advocates, medical experts, and other journalists have condemned the article for inaccurately portraying such care as controversial, misrepresenting scientific research, and quoting anti-trans activists without proper context." They stated Emily Bazelon noted on Twitter that Genspect engages in "anti-trans activism" but did not present them as such in the article. They noted the article was used as proof of lack of medical consensus on transgender care by the state of Texas in a court case to criminalize gender-affirming care for minors. Ky Schevers and Lee Leveille of Health Liberation Now! criticized Bazelon's coverage. Bazelon had interviewed and been in communication with both of them but did not include them in the article. Schevers told the Observer that "It was disappointing and infuriating to see her disregard our warnings and now to learn that her article is being used as evidence to stop trans youth from accessing healthcare."

PinkNews criticized it as well, accusing the article of "uncritically platformed ... Genspect" and of spreading "vile rhetoric". Ky Schevers was quoted stating: "The NYT just platformed a group made up of transphobic parents & conversion therapists who've written about how they have the same end goals as hardline trans eliminationists but moderate their views to try to break into the mainstream." Trans author Dr. Sunny Moraine accused the article of "sanitizing wildly transphobic talking points", while instructor Alejandra Caraballo of Harvard Law School described it as having "only just further opened the door for eliminationist policies".

In February 2023, Media Matters for America criticized the New York Times' coverage of transgender issues, stating it "featured profile after profile that platformed anti-trans extremists, fearmongered about the price of transgender acceptance, and framed rising trans identification as a social contagion." It criticized Genspect's appearance in the June 2022 article, as well as a January 2023 article, "When Students Change Gender Identity, and Parents Don't Know", which mentioned "a network of internet support groups for 'skeptical' parents of transgender children, some with thousands of registered members" without noting the groups are run by Genspect.

== See also ==
- Transgender health care misinformation
- 21st-century anti-trans movement in the United Kingdom
- 2020s anti-LGBTQ movement in the United States
- Therapy First
- LGB Alliance
- Bayswater Support Group
