= Rapid-onset gender dysphoria controversy =

Controversy surrounding a hypothesized medical condition

Rapid-onset gender dysphoria (ROGD) is a controversial, scientifically unsupported hypothesis which claims that some adolescents identify as transgender and experience gender dysphoria due to peer influence and social contagion, particularly those assigned female at birth. (Note: Multiple sources.: For the controversy, see Wadman (2018) and Bartlett (2019).; For the lack of scientific evidence, see Restar (2019), Rider (2021), Kesslen (2022) and Broderick (2023).) ROGD is not recognized as a valid mental health diagnosis by any major professional association. The APA, WPATH and 60 other medical professional organizations have called for its elimination from clinical settings due to a lack of reputable scientific evidence for the concept, major methodological issues in existing research, and its stigmatization of gender-affirming care for transgender youth.

The paper initially proposing the concept was based on surveys of parents of transgender youth recruited from three anti-trans websites; following its publication, it was re-reviewed and a correction was issued highlighting that ROGD is not a clinically validated phenomenon. (Note: Not a clinically validated phenomenon: From the MIT Technology Review: "PLOS One reissued the study with a large correction emphasizing that Littman's paper was simply a 'descriptive, exploratory' one and had not been clinically validated."; From Scientific American: "The American Psychological Association and 61 other health care providers' organizations signed a letter in 2021 denouncing the validity of rapid-onset gender dysphoria (ROGD) as a clinical diagnosis."; Joerg Heber, speaking in 2019 as editor-in-chief of PLOS One, which published Littman's article and the correction, wrote the following, in an apology published at PLOS One: "In our view, the corrected article now provides a better context of the work, as a report of parental observations, but not a clinically validated phenomenon or a diagnostic guideline."; In a correction of the original article published in PLOS One in 2019, author Lisa Littman stated: "Rapid-onset gender dysphoria (ROGD) is not a formal mental health diagnosis at this time. This report did not collect data from the adolescents and young adults (AYAs) or clinicians and therefore does not validate the phenomenon.") Since the paper's publication, the concept has frequently been cited in legislative attempts to restrict the rights of transgender youth.

== History ==
According to bioethicist Florence Ashley, "rapid-onset gender dysphoria" (or ROGD) is "a hypothesized new clinical subgroup of transgender youth, which would be characterized by coming out as transgender out of the blue in adolescence or early adulthood." Ashley states that ROGD is often associated with the work of Dr. Lisa Littman, who attempted to validate the ROGD hypothesis by publishing a study based on the reports of parents recruited from well-known anti-trans websites.

=== Initial surveys (2016–2018) ===
Lisa Littman, who had not previously studied transgender health care or gender dysphoria, noticed a few teenagers in the same friend group who started identifying as trans, and decided to survey parents. The term first appeared in 2016 notices posted to three anti-transgender blogs asking readers to respond to a research survey if they had a child who showed "a sudden or rapid development of gender dysphoria". An article published in Science described the first two websites (4thWaveNow and Transgender Trend) as "gathering places for parents concerned by their children's exploration of a transgender identity", with the third, Youth TransCritical Professionals (YTCP), being closed to non-members. Bioethicist Florence Ashley described the first as "dedicated to opposing gender-affirmative care for trans youth" and the latter two as dedicated to opposing what they call "trans ideology".

The study was based on 256 responses to an online survey of parents recruited from these three websites, though Littman said she encouraged wider distribution of the survey beyond them. The study states that participants were encouraged to distribute the study only to "individuals or communities that they thought might include eligible participants", which the study defined as parents who believed "their child had a sudden or rapid onset of gender dysphoria".

An email leak in 2023 revealed Lisa Marchiano, a Pennsylvania-based psychotherapist, was the author of YTCP; Marchiano also contributes to both of the other sites. Littman's manuscript thanked Marchiano for her "feedback on earlier versions of the manuscript" but did not disclose that she was the publisher of YTCP. In August 2016, the conservative Christian advocacy group Alliance Defending Freedom sent an email to members warning of the "danger" of ROGD, linking to a column in the National Review. In October 2016, Lisa Marchiano published a blog post discussing ROGD. In 2017, Marchiano argued in a paper in Psychological Perspectives that "social contagion" was a component of ROGD. The same year, American-Canadian sexologist Ray Blanchard and American psychologist J. Michael Bailey, whose work has been criticized for suggesting non-heterosexual transgender women transition due to sexual arousal, wrote for 4thWaveNow to promote the concept of ROGD. Kenneth Zucker, whose clinic was closed due to allegations of practicing conversion therapy on its patients, also referred to Littman's poster presentation on ROGD in publications in 2017 and 2018.

=== Publication sparks debate ===
The study, originally titled "Rapid-onset gender dysphoria in adolescents and young adults: A study of parental reports" was initially published in PLOS One in August 2018. Littman's poster abstract for the study was published in February 2017, using the phrase "Rapid Onset of Gender Dysphoria" in the title. Littman presented preliminary results at a 2017 conference. Littman's study reported on information the parents reported about their children's peer group dynamics, social media use, and prior mental health issues. Littman speculated that rapid onset of gender dysphoria could be a social coping mechanism for other disorders, such as depression and anxiety caused by trauma. Of the parents surveyed, 76.5% "believed their child was incorrect in their belief of being transgender" and over 85% said their child had increased their internet use and/or had trans friends before identifying as trans; Littman acknowledged "parent-child conflict may also explain some of the findings."

The publication immediately sparked a debate. The publisher of the study, PLOS One, announced two weeks after publication that it would open a post-publication review of the study's methodologies and analyses. On the same day that PLOS One announced its review, Brown University took down a press release it had earlier posted about the paper. Responding to critics, Brown University president Christina Paxson and Provost Richard M. Locke said they had not infringed on academic freedom, noted that the paper was still accessible online, and stated that Brown's commitment to only "publicize research that unassailably meets the highest standards of excellence" required Brown to remove the press release after PLOS One opened an investigation on the paper in question. They said that "given the concerns raised about research design and methods, the most responsible course of action was to stop publicizing the work published in this particular instance. We would have done this regardless of the topic of the article."

==== Common criticism ====
The paper was immediately met with criticism from health researchers and transgender activists. The main criticisms of the study were: only parents were interviewed, the websites used to recruit those parents were biased, it suggested that gender dysphoria or a transgender identity could be "socially contagious", it relied on a pathologizing framework, and it made premature diagnostic suggestions. Another common concern was that the study had been politicized to give ammunition to those who opposed gender affirming care.

=== Post-publication review and correction (2019) ===
In March 2019, PLOS One completed its post-publication review, and Littman's corrected version of the paper was published on March 19, 2019. In the journal's blog, PLOS One editor Joerg Heber apologized "to the trans and gender variant community" for the previous review and publication, saying "the study, including its goals, methodology, and conclusions, were not adequately framed in the published version, and that these needed to be corrected." Heber noted that the hypothesized condition of ROGD had "not yet been clinically validated".

In a notice of correction prefacing her updated version of the study, Littman stated:

[T]he post-publication review identified issues that needed to be addressed to ensure the article meets PLOS ONE's publication criteria. Given the nature of the issues in this case, the PLOS ONE Editors decided to republish the article, replacing the original version of record with a revised version in which the author has updated the Title, Abstract, Introduction, Discussion, and Conclusion sections, to address the concerns raised in the editorial reassessment. The Materials and methods section was updated to include new information and more detailed descriptions about recruitment sites and to remove two figures due to copyright restrictions. Other than the addition of a few missing values in Table 13, the Results section is unchanged in the updated version of the article.

Littman also noted that "Rapid-onset gender dysphoria (ROGD) is not a formal mental health diagnosis at this time." She wrote:

This study of parent observations and interpretations serves to develop the hypotheses that rapid-onset gender dysphoria is a phenomenon and that social influences, parent-child conflict, and maladaptive coping mechanisms may be contributing factors for some individuals. ... This report did not collect data from the adolescents and young adults (AYAs) or clinicians and therefore does not validate the phenomenon.

PLOS One's editor wrote that "the corrected article now provides a better context of the work, as a report of parental observations, but not a clinically validated phenomenon or a diagnostic guideline". On behalf of the journal, Heber wrote: "Correcting the scientific record in this manner and in such circumstances is a sign of responsible publishing", where further scrutiny was called for to "clarify whether the conclusions presented are indeed backed up by the analysis and data of that original study". Heber later stated, "At its core, the survey of the parents stands as it is... We let the original results stand."

In a formal comment published by PLOS One at the conclusion of its review, academic editor and professor of social psychology Angelo Brandelli Costa wrote, "the level of evidence produced by the Dr. Littman's study cannot generate a new diagnostic criterion relative to the time of presentation of the demands of medical and social gender affirmation." Costa suggested, "Several procedures still need to be adopted to generate a potential new subcategory of gender dysphoria that has not yet been clinically validated. One of these procedures is the assessment of mental health professionals trained according to the World Professional Association for Transgender Health (WPATH) and the American Psychological Association (APA) guidelines, interviewing not just the family, but the youth (longitudinally)."

== Reactions ==
=== Professional commentary ===
Following publication of the original report in PLOS One, the World Professional Association for Transgender Health (WPATH) released an official statement on the proposed clinical phenomenon "rapid-onset gender dysphoria", stating that the term is not recognized by any professional association, nor listed in the DSM or ICD lists of disorders and diseases. They said in summary that "it is nothing more than an acronym created to describe a proposed clinical phenomenon that may or may not warrant further peer-reviewed scientific investigation." They affirmed the need for academic freedom and scientific exploration without censorship, and that much is still unknown about the factors contributing to the development of gender identity in adolescence, and said it was "premature and inappropriate" to use "official-sounding labels" that might influence professionals or the public to reach conclusions about how or when adolescents decide to come out as transgender. WPATH concluded by warning against the use of any term intended to cause fear about an adolescent's possible transgender status with the goal of avoiding or deterring them from accessing the appropriate treatment, in line with the standards of care appropriate for the situation.

The Gender Dysphoria Affirmative Working Group (GDA) of 44 professionals in transgender health wrote an open letter to Psychology Today citing previously published criticism of the study, stating it had multiple biases and flaws in methodology, as it drew its subjects from "websites openly hostile to transgender youth" and based its conclusions on the beliefs of parents who presupposed the existence of ROGD. Noting Littman had not interviewed the teens, the GDA stated onset may only have been "rapid" from parents' point of view because teens often delay coming out.

In 2021, the Coalition for the Advancement and Application of Psychological Science released a statement calling for the elimination of the concept of ROGD from clinical and diagnostic use, as "there are no sound empirical studies of ROGD and it has not been subjected to rigorous peer-review processes that are standard for clinical science." The statement also states that the term "ROGD" is likely to stigmatize and cause harm to transgender people, and that misinformation surrounding ROGD is used to justify laws suppressing the rights of transgender youth. The statement was cosigned by the American Psychological Association, the American Psychiatric Association, the Society of Behavioral Medicine, and dozens of other professional and academic organizations.

In 2022, the eighth edition of WPATH's Standards of Care (SOC-8)—a publication providing clinical guidance for healthcare professionals working with transgender and gender diverse individuals—criticized the study due to its methodological flaws. The study's focus on parents of transgender youth recruited from communities with skepticism towards gender affirming care presents difficulty in establishing social influence as a possible factor in development of gender dysphoria. According to the SOC-8, the study's results also have not been replicated by other researchers.

In 2024, the European Academy of Paediatrics published a position statement on clinical management of gender dysphoria in children that briefly noted ROGD as a "controversial suggestion" that had produced a debate "familiar to all, with many experts and scientific bodies critical of the research and concept." The statement also noted that more research into the role of social media in gender dysphoria and mental health was "overdue."

=== Academic ===
Several critiques of the study have been published in peer-reviewed journals. In a 2020 paper published in The Sociological Review, bioethicist Florence Ashley described the study as an attempt to circumvent existing research supporting gender-affirming care. Sociologists Natacha Kennedy and Victoria Pitts-Taylor, in two separate 2020 publications in the Journal of LGBT Youth and Sexualities, described ROGD as a moral panic and said that trans youth are often aware of their identity long before coming out to their parents.

Shortly after PLOS One published the corrected study, a critique of the original study's methodology appeared in Archives of Sexual Behavior. The author, Arjee Restar, said that Littman's study was fatally methodologically flawed, beginning with the choice to sample exclusively from users of three websites "known for telling parents not to believe their child is transgender", with the result that three-quarters of those surveyed had rejected their child's gender identity; 91 percent of respondents were white, 82 percent were women, and 66 percent were between the ages of 46 and 60. She wrote that the study was mostly composed of "white mothers who have strong oppositional beliefs about their children's trans identification" and that there was very little evidence that Littman's survey responses were representative of trans youth and young adults as a whole. She additionally said "the majority of methodological and design issues stem from the use of a pathologizing framework and language of pathology to conceive, describe, and theorize the phenomenon [of ROGD] as tantamount to both an infectious disease…and a disorder".

The SAGE Encyclopedia of Trans Studies describes ROGD as "an anti-trans theory" that "violates principles of research methods by using a pathologizing framework and language", using terminology that compares gender dysphoria and transgender identification to a contagious disease, in opposition to organizations such as WPATH, the American Psychiatric Association, and the World Health Organization who state that being trans is not a mental disorder. The encyclopedia further states that bias appears to be present at every stage of the study, including its basic premise, the absence of random sampling, self-selection bias in the recruitment process, and the data collection procedure, which was described as "fundamentally flawed in a number of critical ways". Additionally, the encyclopedia entry notes that, although the parents may have believed the development of their child's gender identity to have been abrupt, the data were not collected from the youths themselves, and so Littman's study cannot ascertain whether these individuals had simply chosen not to reveal their gender identity at an earlier time.

According to MIT Technology Review, "while theories and rumors about something like ROGD had quietly percolated online before the paper was published, Littman's descriptive study gave legitimacy to the concept. ... The ROGD paper was not funded by anti-trans zealots. But it arrived at exactly the time people with bad intentions were looking for science to buoy their opinions."

=== Anti-transgender activism and legislation ===
Multiple anti-LGBT groups and activists have used ROGD to undermine access to gender-affirming care globally despite the lack of scientific support for the concept. ROGD is often cited by gender-critical groups as a reason not to allow children to socially transition at school. Littman serves as the president of the Institute for Comprehensive Gender Dysphoria Research (ICGDR), formed in January 2021, and serves on the board of the Gender Dysphoria Alliance with Ray Blanchard. The ICGDR funds open-access articles that question gender-affirming care and promote ROGD. It receives programmatic support and shares personnel with the overlapping groups Genspect, the Society for Evidence-Based Gender Medicine, and the Gender Exploratory Therapy Association. The Southern Poverty Law Center has described these organizations as involved in producing anti-LGBTQ+ pseudoscience and stated "many of the groups' members have made numerous misleading, false and conspiratorial claims."

In 2019, representative Doug Collins of Georgia read part of the study when voicing his opposition to the US Equality Act. In 2021, there were over 100 bills in the United States targeting transgender adolescents, many of which were based on the unsupported claims of ROGD. In 2022, over 25 states introduced anti-trans bills which often cited ROGD. In Florida, it was cited multiple times to justify banning Medicaid funding for adult transition-related healthcare.

In December 2023, the Southern Poverty Law Center published an analysis of citations used in anti-LGBT expert reports, declarations, and legal complaints in 4 high-profile ongoing cases regarding gender-affirming care. They reported Littman's 2019 paper, described as "a centerpiece for anti-trans arguments in general" was tied for most cited paper and stated that despite the flaws that led to the paper's correction it "is a staple of arguments against gender-affirming care for minors[22] because if it were true, it would suggest that the bulk of youth presenting for care: (a) are dissimilar enough from prior samples that any evidence for benefits could not be applied to them, and (b) are unlikely to be really trans, and therefore will likely regret transition should they access it. The expert witnesses thus uncritically accept Littman's (2018) findings as established fact, and either ignore widespread criticisms of the paper (e.g., Levine, Hruz) and/or dismiss them as authoritarian "silencing" of sound science (e.g., Levine, Hruz, and Kaliebe)." They had previously stated "The rise of anti-trans sentiment among anti-LGBTQ groups has fueled a cottage industry of anti-trans research that in turn is promoted by anti-LGBTQ groups, including ACPeds, which has become a go-to for expertise in anti-trans pseudoscience", listing the original study as an example, further stating "anti-LGBTQ media circulated the study widely, and ACPeds' Cretella touted the study at the 2018 Values Voter gathering (sponsored by anti-LGBTQ hate group Family Research Council)."

The Human Rights Campaign stated "anti-LGBTQ+ activists often use concerns about internet safety in order to spread harmful rumors about the LGBTQ+ community. You may see opponents of trans people specifically use junk science by Lisa Littman at Brown University to falsely claim that access to social media and the internet has created a 'contagion' that causes many youth to mistakenly identify as transgender."

Gillian Branstetter, a communications strategist at the American Civil Liberties Union said the paper "laundered what had previously been the rantings of online conspiracy theorists and gave it the resemblance of serious scientific study" and "It is astonishing that such a blatantly bad-faith effort has been taken so seriously". Littman rejected the characterization, describing it as a "very good-faith attempt" to "find out what's going on" and adding, "As a person I am liberal; I'm pro-LGBT. I saw a phenomenon with my own eyes and I investigated, found that it was different than what was in the scientific literature." Littman has also stated that her paper "does not apply to all cases of gender dysphoria" and "doesn't imply that nobody benefits from transition". Littman stood by the core claims she made in her study, including its conclusion that more research needs to be conducted.

ROGD was endorsed by the Trump administration in January 2025 as part of Executive Order 14187.

=== Popular press ===
Scholars writing in The Conversation and journalists in Slate columns have condemned what they saw as politicization of science by social conservatives. Madeleine Kearns, a contributing writer at National Review, called for further study into the proposed phenomenon. Writer and transgender advocate Liz Duck-Chong described the hypothesized condition as "a poisonous lie used to discredit trans people" in an op-ed published in The Guardian, while Abigail Shrier, who later published the controversial book Irreversible Damage about the concept, called it an explanation for the experiences of parents in an op-ed published in The Wall Street Journal.

In a Psychology Today opinion piece, Rutgers University psychology professor Lee Jussim described the PLOS-requested rewrite of the paper as an "Orwellian correction" involving additions and minor changes where no errors had existed. Jeffrey Flier, a former dean of Harvard Medical School, called Brown University's failure to defend Littman "an indictment of the integrity of their academic and administrative leadership", and described Brown's explanation of the retraction as "anti-intellectual" and "completely antithetical to academic freedom".

Conservative media outlets such as Fox News, The Daily Caller, The Federalist, Breitbart, and Quillette heavily publicized the article and criticized Brown recalling its initial press release concerning the paper. Conservative outlets cite the paper to claim that transgender identity is a "trend, phase, or disease".

== Further research ==
Some clinicians state that an increasing prevalence of trans youth first presenting in early adolescence, as described in Littman's research, is consistent with their patient population, though they are uncertain as to causes or implications for clinical treatment. In a 2020 commentary in Pediatrics, citing Littman's paper among others, Annelou de Vries wrote that gender identity development was diverse and called for more research into this demographic cohort.

A November 2021 study by Bauer et al. published in the Journal of Pediatrics examined data on a cohort of 173 trans adolescents from Canada to assess whether there was evidence for a rapid-onset pathway for gender dysphoria. The authors noted that while it was common to see adolescents presenting with gender dysphoria around puberty, in many cases patients had been aware of gender dysphoria from a younger age. The authors sought to establish whether there was any link between later awareness of gender ("rapid onset") and other factors including mental health problems, lack of parental support, and high level of support from online and/or transgender friends. No evidence was found for any link between "rapid onset" and mental health problems, lack of parental support, or high level of support from online or transgender friends. Where relationships were found, they were in the opposite direction to that suggested by Littman's work. For instance, trans adolescents who had been dissatisfied with their gender for longer were more likely to suffer anxiety and more likely to misuse marijuana. The authors considered that they found no evidence of "rapid onset gender dysphoria" being a distinct clinical phenomenon.

Littman critiqued Bauer et al., saying that Bauer had used an incorrect definition of 'ROGD', by relating it to having a short history of gender incongruence, whereas it actually refers to not having gender incongruence before puberty.

Ferrara et al. noted the controversy that rose around the possibility of a rapid-onset of gender dysphoria condition and the position of major medical associations not to recognize ROGD and to discourage its use, due to a lack of consistent scientific evidence for the concept. They also cited the Bauer finding of no support for ROGD being a distinct phenomenon, and concluded that the issue is still open, citing Sinai and the Littman response to Bauer.

Arnoldussen et al. suggested that there may be different gender identity developmental pathways and described ROGD as one subtype that has been proposed, but their data did not allow a conclusion as to whether or not the ROGD subtype exists, though they noted "our results show that there was gender nonconformity in childhood in older presenters, although less extreme than in the younger presenting group, which speaks against this suggested subtype". They noted the Bauer finding as well as the Littman response to it, and concluded that better insight into this question would require more studies using both self and parent report measures.

An August 2022 study published in Pediatrics investigated claims of trans identities as "social contagion" for youth assigned female at birth (AFAB) by analyzing the ratio of assigned male at birth (AMAB) youth to AFAB trans youth in the US in 2017 and 2019 by using the Youth Risk Behavior Survey from these years. The study found that AMAB trans youth were more common than AFAB youth in both years, that the number of total trans youth declined between 2017 and 2019, and that there was a relative increase in AFAB youth over time—but this was due more to a decrease in AMAB youth than an increase in AFAB youth. It also found trans youth were more likely to be bullied than cisgender lesbian, gay, and bisexual (LGB) youth and a substantial percentage of trans youth identified as LGB as well. This lack of increase in AFAB youth was interpreted as inconsistent with the social contagion hypothesis. The higher rates of bullying for trans youth compared to cisgender LGB youth and substantial percentage of transgender youth who also identified as LGB were also interpreted as evidence against the hypothesis that youth are transitioning to avoid stigma related to being a sexual minority.

In 2023, Springer retracted a paper by Diaz and Bailey on the rapid onset gender dysphoria (ROGD) hypothesis "due to concerns about lack of informed consent", which had been published in the Archives of Sexual Behavior. This followed an open letter signed by a number of researchers and LGBTQ organizations criticizing the journal's publication of the paper, stating that Bailey's paper did not have institutional review board (IRB) approval, and requested the journal's editor Kenneth Zucker be replaced. Critics also said that the paper disregarded countervailing evidence and used a biased method of gathering study participants.

In July 2024, a paper examining the ROGD hypothesis against the existing evidence base noted the "scant evidence" supporting the theory and described Littman's study as hypothesis-generating rather than hypothesis-testing. The paper noted that the only study to empirically test ROGD using clinical data found no support for it as a distinct clinical phenomenon, and that ROGD "may provide a convenient pathogenic explanatory model" for those opposed to adolescent transition. The authors nonetheless called for further research, concluding that "neither prematurely adopting ROGD as a valid explanatory model nor its hasty condemnation as transphobic is an appropriate response".

== See also ==
- Acquired homosexuality
- Causes of gender incongruence
- Conversion therapy – Pseudoscientific attempts to change sexual orientation or gender identity
- Gender dysphoria in children – Discontent with sex assigned at birth in children
- Problematic social media use – Proposed medical diagnosis related to overuse of social media
- Social media use in politics
