= List of laws and reports on LGBT rights in the Republic of Ireland =

This is a list of laws, court cases and reports on LGB rights in Ireland.

== An act for the punishment of the vice of buggery 1634 ==
This was an act of the Parliament of Ireland which adopted the Buggery Act 1533 of the Parliament of England into Irish law. This act made the death penalty the punishment upon conviction. The act did not define what buggery meant, but it was widely understood to mean male-to-male penetrative sexual acts as well as sexual acts with animals.

== Offences Against the Person (Ireland) Act 1829 ==
This act restated that buggery was to be punished by the death penalty.

== Offences Against the Person Act 1861 ==
This act updated and streamlined the criminal law of Great Britain and Ireland. It outlawed many forms of practices, including 'buggery' or male-to-male penetrative sex. The punishment was life imprisonment or a jail sentence of at least 10 years. It abolished the death penalty for such acts, which had been the law up to this point.

== Criminal Law Amendment Act 1885 ==
Section 11 of the Criminal Law Amendment Act 1885, commonly known as the Labouchère Amendment, outlawed what was termed "acts of gross indecency" between men both in public and in private. The definition was vague and included intimate acts falling short of penetrative sex between two men. Male-to-male sex was illegal under the previous law, but it was very narrowly interpreted by the courts. Usually, the courts required that penetration to have occurred for "buggery" to have taken place. This new act made it much easier to punish men's intimate acts together. The penalty was a maximum of two years' imprisonment. The Irish author and dramatist Oscar Wilde was convicted in England under this act.

== Vagrancy Act 1898 ==
This prohibited soliciting or importuning for immoral purposes. It was originally intended as a measure against male-to-female prostitution; however, in practice, these measures were almost solely applied to male-to-male sex acts.

== Criminal Law (Amendment) Act 1912 ==
This allowed flogging to be used as a punishment for existing crimes in regard to sexual offences.

== Criminal Law Bill 1921 ==
Proposed to extend the provision criminalising gross indecency between males to gross indecency between females. This bill was dropped due to those who felt that to even criminalise female-to-female sex acts would draw attention to these acts and publicise them. As a result, female-to-female sex acts were legal, unlike male-to-male sex acts.

== Norris v. the Attorney General (1980) (High Court) ==
David Norris, who later served as a senator for Dublin University from 1987 to 2024 and contested the 2011 presidential election, took High Court proceedings against the Attorney General challenging the criminalisation of male-to-male sex. He argued that the law infringed on his right to privacy to have consensual sex with a man and that since the introduction of the Constitution of Ireland, the law passed under British rule had become repugnant to the constitution. The High Court ruled against Norris. He appealed his case to the Supreme Court.

== Norris v. the Attorney General (1983) (Supreme Court) ==
Having lost his High Court case, Norris appealed his case to the Supreme Court. The Supreme Court upheld the constitutionality of the law by a three-to-two judgment.

== Health (Family Planning) (Amendment) Act 1985 ==
This act legalised the manufacture, sale, and importation of condoms in Ireland. Prior to this condoms were banned in Irish law. The law was changed to allow condoms in order to help protect the health and lives of gay men during the AIDS crisis.

== Norris v. Ireland (1988) (European Court of Human Rights) ==
Having lost the Supreme Court case, Norris took his case to the European Court of Human Rights. The European Court struck down the law on privacy grounds. It was held that the law criminalising male-to-male sex was contrary to the right of privacy under Article 8 of the European Convention on Human Rights. Irish law was regarded as too narrow and extreme.

== Regulations regarding sexual orientation in the Irish Civil Service (1988) ==
These regulations affected the terms and conditions of employment of civil servants. These regulations prohibited discrimination on the grounds of sexual orientation or if a person was HIV positive.

== Prohibition of Incitement To Hatred Act 1989 ==
Prohibited inciting hatred on various grounds, including a person's sexual orientation. This was the first piece of legislation to actually provide some protection to gays and lesbians.

== Video Recordings Act 1989 ==
This act regulates the sale and supply of video recordings. It allows the Censor to suppress videos that are likely to stir up hatred against a person or group of persons on account of their sexual orientation, as well as on other grounds.

== Child Care Act 1991 ==
This act regulates the service of fostering. This act permits same-sex couples to apply jointly for fostering. This may not have been intended at the time to permit same-sex couples to foster children; however, it has since become the practice to allow same-sex couples to foster.

== Adoption Act 1991 ==
Up until this act, an adoption could only be granted to a married couple living together, the natural parents of the child, a relative of the child or a widow or widower. This act allowed a person unrelated to the child to adopt, provided the Adoption Board was satisfied that it was in the best interests of the child. This meant that a single person, irrespective of their sexual orientation, could adopt a child. Presumably, this was to take place in exceptional circumstances. Same-sex and opposite-sex cohabiting couples were not permitted to apply for adoption. This was changed by the Children and Family Relationships Act 2015.

== Criminal Law (Sexual Offences) Act 1993 ==
Decriminalised acts of male-to-male sex. This act repealed the sections of the Offences Against the Person Act 1861 on buggery over the age of 17, thereby setting an equal age of consent for same-sex or opposite-sex sexual intercourse. It also repealed the Criminal Law Amendment Act 1885 in its entirety, thereby abolishing "acts of gross indecency between males" in law.

== Unfair Dismissals (Amendment) Act 1993 ==
Prohibits dismissing an employee on a number of grounds, including sexual orientation.

== Social Welfare (Consolidation) Act 1993 ==
This act provided the legal basis for social welfare payments and consolidated all previous social welfare acts into a single act. This act allowed for some social welfare payments to be given to cohabiting opposite-sex couples. Same-sex couples were not recognised and thus were unable to apply for any social welfare payments as a couple.

== Health Insurance Act 1994 ==
This act prohibited health insurance companies from varying their premiums on the grounds of a person's sexual orientation.

== Domestic Violence Act 1996 ==
Allows for a partner in a same-sex cohabiting relationship to apply for a safety order or an interim protection order, but does not allow for a permanent barring order, which was at the time available to married couples and opposite-sex couples. This has since been changed. See Civil Law (Miscellaneous Provisions) Act 2011 below. Also see Domestic Violence Act 2018

== Powers of Attorney Act 1996 ==
Widened a person's right to grant power of attorney beyond their family or next of kin. A person could grant power of attorney to another person, e.g., their partner, who becomes unable to make decisions for themselves due to mental incapacity. This law was amended by the Assisted Decision-Making (Capacity) Act 2015.

== Refugee Act 1996 ==
Allowed refugee status to be conferred on an individual on the basis of a fear of persecution arising from their sexual orientation.

== Freedom of Information Act 1997 ==
This act allows the general public to have access to information and records kept about them by the civil service, state agencies and private companies. The act allows information on a person's sexual orientation to be kept on record and to be shared.

== Treaty of Amsterdam 1997 ==
Sexual orientation was included amongst the grounds for prohibiting discrimination at work. In order to ratify the Treaty of Amsterdam, a referendum had to be held to amend the Irish constitution. The Eighteenth Amendment of the Constitution of Ireland amended the constitution in order to allow the state to ratify the Treaty of Amsterdam.

== British-Irish Agreement 1998 ==
The British-Irish Agreement provided the legal basis for the Good Friday Agreement. In the Good Friday Agreement, the British government committed to establishing a Human Rights Commission for Northern Ireland. It also committed all public bodies to carry out their duties with due regard for the need to promote equality of opportunity on nine grounds, including sexual orientation. The Irish government gave a similar commitment. The Nineteenth Amendment of the Constitution of Ireland allowed the Irish state to ratify the British-Irish Agreement.

== Employment Equality Act 1998 ==
Prohibited discrimination at work on a number of grounds, including sexual orientation. The act covered aspects such as terms and conditions in employment contracts; promotion and demotion; harassment at work; indirect discrimination; pay and work conditions; membership of unions and professional bodies; and participation in training courses. Mechanisms were put in place to ensure the enforcement of this Act. A person can seek mediation or adjudication with the Equality Authority or go to the Equality Tribunal for a binding ruling, which can only be appealed to the courts on a point of law. Under Section 37(1) as enacted, a religious institution that provided religious, educational, or medical services enjoyed a broad exemption from this act, allowing religious-run schools and hospitals to take action against an employee or prospective employee to uphold their ethos. Since 98% of primary schools and 52% of secondary schools are run by religious organisations, this meant that up until 2015, a school could legally discriminate against a gay or lesbian employee. Section 37.1 was amended to narrow the grounds for legal discrimination by the Equality (Miscellaneous Provisions) Act 2015.

== Equal Status Act 2000 ==
Prohibited discrimination on many grounds, including sexual orientation, in the provision of services and goods by commercial companies as well as by state institutions such as the civil service and state agencies. It covered a wide area of services such as financial produces–mortgages, savings, loans; access to building and clubs and societies–not be allowed to be told to leave on the grounds on ones sexual orientation from a nightclub etc.; the state through it civil service and its various agencies could not discriminate in matter such as–granting loans or grants to university, providing an individual dole to other social assistant; in terms of renting property a landlord could not refuse to offer accommodation to a gay man or couple or evict them on that basis. The Act also empowered the Equality Authority to monitor and enforce the law regarding equality in both the provision of goods and services and employment. A person can take a case to the Equality Tribunal in the event of discrimination occurring.

== Finance Act 2000 ==
Allowed cohabiting couples, either same-sex or opposite-sex, to apply for relief on Capital Acquisitions Tax on their property in limited circumstances.

== Health Insurance (Amendment) Act 2001 ==
This restated the prohibition of discrimination in the provision of health insurance on the grounds of sexual orientation under the Health Insurance Act 1994. This applies to individuals and not same-sex couples.

== Implementing Equality for Lesbians, Gays, and Bisexuals 2002 ==
In a wide-ranging report on the situation of gays and lesbians in Ireland, the Equality Authority made many recommendations for change across many areas. Most of its recommendations were non-statutory. It called for all policies of the government departments to be equality proofed on the grounds of sexual orientation. It called for many changes needed to help benefit gays and lesbians, for example, hospital visits of partners of same-sex couples, and the provision of services where the providers are ignorant or unaware of the needs of gays and lesbians. It also called for civil marriage to be widened to also allow same-sex couples to marry. It also called for civil partnership laws to be introduced if same-sex marriage is not allowed.

== European Arrest Warrants Act 2003 ==
This act gave legal effect to the EU Framework Decision on the issuing of European Arrest Warrants. A European arrest warrant applies to all of the EU. However, the Minister for Justice can refuse to surrender a person if it is believed that the European arrest warrant was issued in order to punish that person on the grounds of their sexual orientation as well as on other discriminatory grounds.

== Civil Registration Act 2004 ==
Placed a ban on the ability of two men or two women to enter into marriage. This reinforced the common-law understanding at the time that marriage is between one man and one woman. This act allowed for marriages (between a man and a woman) to take place in locations other than a church and a registry office. This bar was removed by the Marriage Act 2015.

== Social Welfare (Miscellaneous Provisions) Act 2004 ==
This act prohibited unfair discrimination in the provision of occupational pensions on the grounds of sexual orientation. This related to individuals only. This does not make a requirement for pension schemes to pay a death grant to the surviving partner of a same-sex relationship. This has been partially amended by the enactment of civil partnership and marriage for same-sex couples. Married same-sex couples and civil partners are, in general, entitled by law to a death grant from an occupational pension scheme where that scheme does the same for married opposite-sex couples. A same-sex cohabiting couple do not enjoy this protection.

== Equality Act 2004 ==
Allows positive action to be taken in the workforce to promote greater equality on all nine grounds, as outlined in the act, including sexual orientation. It also closes a loophole regarding harassment whereby a person need not have the characteristics imputed to them in such a situation. For example, if a person is subject to homophobic jokes but that person is not gay or lesbian, they may take legal action to redress the harassment. Another new provision covers people who suffer from discrimination by association. Such persons can make a case even if they do not fall into one of the nine specific groups covered by the legislation. For example, someone who defends a co-worker who is gay from harassment could, in turn, suffer from harassment. That person can take a case to the Equality Tribunal. Another development concerns indirect discrimination, where a measure, while appearing neutral on its face, has a disproportionate impact on a particular group or individual in the workplace. Companies are required to monitor the impact of their policies on employees and adjust them to cater to employees' different needs.

== Social Welfare Consolidation Act 2005 ==
This act restated the limit contained in the Social Welfare Consolidation Act 1993 prohibiting the granting of social welfare payments to same-sex couples. Some social welfare payments were given to opposite-sex cohabiting couples, while more were given to married couples as well as widows and widowers. This was amended by the Social Welfare and Pensions Act 2010. (see below)

== Criminal Law (Sexual Offences) Act 2006 ==
This abolished the legal concept of buggery under the age of 17 and replaced it with a new offence of 'defilement of a child'. Buggery over the age of 17 had been abolished by the Criminal Law (Sexual Offences) Act 1993. The term 'defilement of a child' was gender neutral, and this covered sexual intercourse with any person under the age of 17. Sexual intercourse with a person under the age of 15 carries a penalty of life imprisonment, while sexual intercourse with a person between the ages of 15 and 17 carries a penalty of 5 years or 10 years if the person is in a position of authority.

== Zappone v. Revenue Commissioners (2006) (High Court) ==
Katherine Zappone and Ann Louise Gilligan, who married in Canada and lived in Ireland, took the Revenue Commissioners to court because they refused to recognise their Canadian marriage and to grant them a joint tax assessment. Married couples in Ireland are entitled to have their income jointly assessed, as this reduces the overall amount of tax paid. The couple argued that marriage is not defined in the constitution to specify either same sex or opposite sex. They also argued that their rights were being infringed by the lack of recognition of their marriage. The High Court rejected the couple's arguments. Ms Justice Dunne accepted that the Irish Constitution does not define marriage as between opposite-sex couples; however, she argued that marriage was traditionally understood to be between a man and a woman, and that this understanding of marriage ran through all court cases and legislation concerning the rights and duties of married couples. Katherine Zappone and Ann Louise Gilligan initially decided to appeal their case to the Supreme Court. However, they decided to change the grounds of their challenge, and this required them to issue a new legal challenge in the High Court. In their original case, they did not challenge the constitutionality of the Civil Registration Act 2004, which put into law an impediment to two same-sex couples from getting married. After the opening up of marriage to same-sex couples under the Thirty-fourth Amendment of the Constitution of Ireland and the Marriage Act 2015, their case became moot.

== Options Paper (2006) (Dept. of Justice, Equality and Law Reform) ==
This was drafted by a working group of former politicians, civil servants, and members from relevant NGOs. This working group was established by the then Minister for Justice, Equality, and Law Reform. It was chaired by Anne Colley. This paper examined the various options open to the government regarding legal recognition of cohabiting couples, both same-sex and opposite-sex. It acknowledged that only the introduction of same-sex marriage would grant full equality for same-sex couples. However, the introduction of same-sex marriage would be constitutionally vulnerable. It is recommended that civil partnership be introduced for same-sex couples.

== Report on Cohabiting couples by the Law Reform Commission 2006 ==
In this report, the Law Reform Commission suggested a scheme whereby same-sex and opposite-sex couples who lived together for 3 years (2 years if they have a child) could make arrangements or sign a legally binding contract regarding taxation, pensions, inheritance, custody and other matters between themselves. Married couples automatically have a wide range of rights, protections, and duties under the law. Same-sex couples, who at the time could not marry, and opposite-sex couples who live together but who choose not to marry, do not benefit from many of these rights unless specifically provided for by law. At the time, very few rights were conferred by law on such couples. The report did not propose a scheme such as civil partnership, as this would prescribe a fixed bundle of rights and duties and would require cohabiting couples to opt in. Instead, each couple would be free to sign a cohabitation contract with the force of law. On the death or break-up of a relationship, one or both of the parties could apply to court to get various court orders for payment or property if they are economically dependent. The report recommended that cohabiting couples should have the right to opt out of this arrangement, but the courts could lay aside this opt-out if it was judged that this opt-out would cause injustice to a former cohabitant. In this report, the Law Reform Commission repeats the recommendations it made in its 2004 consultation paper, but has strengthened them to allow for a wider range of protections, especially those affecting pensions and employment law. It contained a draft bill to allow for the legal recognition of cohabiting couples. Almost all of this draft bill was included as Part 15 of the Civil Partnership and Certain Rights and Obligations of Cohabitants Act 2010.

== Parental Leave (Amendment) Act 2006 ==
Entitles a person to take force majeure leave, which is paid time off work to care for their same-sex partner and to make arrangements to have them taken care of in the event of a sudden illness or in an emergency. This did not cover parental leave, which was only available to married couples and opposite-sex cohabiting couples until 2016. See Paternity Leave and Benefit Act 2016.

== European Communities (Free Movement of Persons) Regulations 2006 ==
This statutory instrument put the EU Directive 2004/38/EC into law. It allows same-sex couples in which one person is an EEA national, and the other is a non-EEA national to live in Ireland without the requirement to obtain a work permit. The same-sex couple had to be in a relationship for 2 years, and the relationship had to be attestable, that is, there was proof that the relationship was genuine. This did not cover Irish nationals who were in a relationship with a non-EEA national. In 2008, this loophole was closed, and a non-EEA national cohabiting with an Irish national is no longer required to obtain a work permit.

== Treaty of Lisbon 2007 ==
The Treaty of Lisbon was signed in 2007 and entered into force on 1 December 2009. For the Irish state to ratify the treaty, the constitution had to be amended, which required a referendum. The Twenty-eighth Amendment of the Constitution of Ireland amended the constitution to permit ratification. The Treaty of Lisbon gives legal effect to the Charter of Fundamental Rights of the European Union. This Charter prohibits any discrimination in the workplace on the grounds of sexual orientation. The Charter is limited in its application to areas of law within the EU's competence. It is unclear what consequences this will have vis-á-vis Section 37(1) of the Employment Equality Act 1998, which grants an exemption to religious-run institutions to discriminate legally in order to uphold the ethos of their institution.

== Criminal Justice (Mutual Assistance) Act 2008 ==
With this act, Ireland ratified a number of international conventions on the cooperation of justice systems concerning the arrest and extradition of criminals within the EU, with the United States, and under UN conventions. The Irish state can refuse to provide cooperation if the Minister for Justice believes that to do so will result in a person being punished on the grounds of their sexual orientation.

== McD v. L (High Court) (2008) ==
In this case, a lesbian couple, P.L. and B.M., had a child using sperm donated by J.McD. a gay friend of theirs. They had arranged a contract with J.McD. The role of J.McD. was to act as an 'uncle' to the child but not be involved in the child's daily life. J.McD. went to court to establish guardianship over the child, as its natural father. The High Court refused J.McD.'s application. The High Court upheld the contract agreed by P.L. and B.M. and granted them sole guardianship and custody of the child at the centre of the case. Significantly, the High Court acknowledged the lesbian couple and their child as a de facto family who enjoyed the rights granted to families under Article 8 of the European Convention on Human Rights. The judge also called upon the Oireachtas to legislate for same-sex couples who raise children and recognise them as families.

== European Communities (Free Movement of Persons) (Amendment) Regulations 2008 ==
This amended the 2006 regulations. It removed the requirement that a same-sex couple, with one of the partners being a non-EEA national, must have been resident in another member state in order to move to Ireland. This meant that an Irish citizen and his or her same-sex partner could move to Ireland. This change in law resulted from the Metock Case, decided by the European Court of Justice.

== Health Insurance (Miscellaneous Provisions) Act 2009 ==
This restated the ban on varying health insurance premiums on the grounds of sexual orientation and on other grounds. It is a provision similar to those in the Health Insurance Act 1994 and the Health Insurance (Amendment) Act 2001.

== McD v. L (Supreme Court) (2009) ==
The Supreme Court reversed most of the High Court's decision. The Supreme Court rejected that same sex couples constitute a "family" under Irish law. Despite this McD was not granted guardianship over the child as the child's natural father, but was granted access rights as it was held that that was in the best interests of the child to remain with the lesbian couple. Since 2015, most of this court decision is moot as same-sex couples are now recognised as family and there is some recognition of children of same sex couples in law.

== Civil Partnership and Certain Rights and Obligations of Cohabitants Act 2010 ==
The Civil Partnership and Certain Rights and Obligations of Cohabitants Act 2010 allows for same-sex couples to enter a civil partnership on the same terms as married couples. The act deals with a number of areas such as succession of property, pension entitlements, domestic violence, and maintenance in the event of a breakdown of a relationship. The social welfare benefits and tax entitlements of civil partners were addressed in other pieces of legislation (see the Social Welfare and Pensions Act 2010 and the Finance (No. 3) Act 2011). The act provides for the recognition in Ireland of same-sex marriages and civil partnerships performed abroad; however, such unions will only be recognised as civil partnerships. The act does not deal with the residency of same-sex couples who wish to become civil partners in Ireland. Civil partners must wait 2 years before their partnership can be dissolved. Judicial separation is not allowed. At the time, civil partners were not allowed to adopt jointly, although one civil partner could adopt a child as a single person. At the time, civil partners could not have joint guardianship of any children they raised together. This was changed under the Children and Family Relationships Act 2015. The first public civil partnerships took place in April 2011. With the passing of the marriage equality referendum, the law has changed, and same-sex couples can now enter a civil partnership. See Marriage Act 2015.

The act also provides for legal recognition of cohabiting couples, both opposite-sex and same-sex, where they have been together for 5 years or 2 years if they have a child in common. Cohabiting couples can enter into a legally enforceable written contract to arrange their affairs regarding finances and property. Prior to this act, the courts refused to regard any contract between cohabiting couples as legally enforceable. Where a cohabitation relationship ends on breakdown or on death one or both of the cohabitants can apply to court to get a maintenance order, property adjustment order, pension adjustment order and other such orders that married couples can get when they are separating or divorcing, provided that the person bringing the case is or was economically dependent on the other cohabitant.

== Social Welfare and Pensions Act 2010 ==
Under this act, civil partners are treated the same as married couples and are entitled to all the benefits available to married couples. Same-sex cohabiting couples are entitled to claim benefits as a 'Qualified Adult' on the same basis as cohabiting opposite-sex couples. Since the coming into effect of this Act, same-sex cohabiting couples will have their income jointly assessed when claiming social welfare. Since 2010, civil partners and married couples have been treated the same under subsequent social welfare acts.

== Finance (No. 3) Act 2011 ==
This act grants civil partners the same tax entitlements as married couples in income tax, stamp duty (which covers the buying and selling of homes), capital acquisitions tax (which covers the inheritance of property), capital gains tax, value-added tax (VAT) and other taxes and fees. This act covers civil partners only. Same-sex cohabiting couples are not entitled to the same range of tax entitlements and must enter into a civil marriage or have entered into a civil partnership to avail of this. Some of the tax entitlements of civil partners have been made retrospective to 1 January 2011, such as capital acquisitions tax and stamp duty. Relief on income tax starts from the date of entry into a civil partnership. Married couples are treated in the same way as they gain relief on income tax from the date of marriage.

== Civil Law (Miscellaneous Provisions) Act 2011 ==
This is an omnibus act covering many areas. It amends the Domestic Violence Act 1996. A person who is living or has lived in an intimate and committed same-sex or opposite-sex relationship will be able to apply for a barring order or a safety order. This expands the grounds of relief that a person can get. Previously, same-sex couples could only get temporary relief, such as stopping orders and interim protection orders. Also, this act will allow a person to apply for a safety order against a person with whom he or she has had a child in common but with whom he or she has never lived.

== Finance Act 2012 ==
This act amended the tax code to correct some anomalies between civil partnership and marriage. For example, civil partners might have had to pay tax on any maintenance payments involving a child or other dependent due to separation or divorce. Married couples do not have to pay tax in this circumstance.

== Protection of Employees (Temporary Agency) Act 2012 ==
This act gives the same protections to persons employed by an agency as to those who are directly employed on a temporary basis. The protections against unfair discrimination on the grounds of sexual orientation and other grounds are the same for agency workers as they are for other employees.

== Health Insurance (Amendment) Act 2012 ==
This act prohibits the variation of the terms of health insurance policies or the premiums on the grounds of sexual orientation. This is similar to the Health Insurance Act 1994, the Health Insurance (Amendment) Act 2001, and the Health Insurance (Amendment) Act 2009.

== Social Welfare and Pensions (Miscellaneous Provisions) Act 2013 ==
This act corrected very minor anomalies between the treatment of married couples and civil partners.

== Courts and Civil Law (Miscellaneous Provisions) Act 2013 ==
This act allowed the press to attend family law cases, provided the anonymity of the persons involved is respected. Up until then, all family law cases were held in private. If sensitive personal information is to be shared, the court can refuse the press entry or restrict the publication of any information shared in the court. Information relating to a person's sexual orientation is regarded as sensitive personal information.

== Irish Human Rights and Equality Commission Act 2014 ==
This act merged the Irish Human Rights Commission and the Equality Authority into a single body, the Irish Human Rights and Equality Commission. This act required that, as far as possible, members of the commission be drawn from the various minority groups, including members from the gay and lesbian community.

== Freedom of Information Act 2014 ==
This act allows the general public to access information and records kept about them by the civil service, state agencies, and private companies. The act allows information on a person's sexual orientation or their civil status (i.e. that they are married or in a civil partnership) to be kept on record and to be shared. The original Freedom of Information Act 1997 was amended in 2003 to restrict the information shared and to increase the charges for members of the press and the public to access information on record. The 2014 act reversed many of the restrictions introduced in 2003.

== Civil Registration (Amendment) Act 2014 ==
This inserted new provisions to prevent civil partnerships of convenience, and it allows for civil partnership ceremonies to take place in the embassies of Ireland.

== Assisted Decision-Making (Capacity) Act 2015 ==
This act covers married couples, civil partners, cohabiting couples, people in other types of relationships (both intimate and non-intimate) and single people.

== Children and Family Relationships Act 2015 ==
This act is wide-ranging in its reform of the law regarding children. It provided for the legal regulation and recognition of donor-assisted human reproduction. It changed the law on child guardianship. Before the act, a married parent automatically had guardianship rights over their children, and the natural mother had automatic guardianship rights as well. The natural father did not have automatic guardianship rights, although he could go to court to establish those rights, or the natural mother could extend those rights to him by statutory declaration. This act automatically gives guardianship rights to natural fathers provided that they have been cohabiting with the natural mother for at least 3 months after the birth of a child in common. It also allows same-sex couples, either in a civil partnership or cohabiting, to apply for guardianship rights over any child they are raising together. It also allows for other relatives of a child, such as grandparents, aunts, and uncles, to apply for guardianship rights over a child they are raising. The act changed the law on adoption, and civil partners and cohabiting couples (either opposite-sex or same-sex) can apply for adoption after they have been living together for 3 years. The act extends adoption leave to civil partners and to cohabiting couples. This act has been modified by the Adoption (Amendment) Act 2017.

== Thirty-fourth Amendment of the Constitution (Marriage Equality) Act 2015 ==
This act amended the Constitution of Ireland to enable the Oireachtas to pass legislation in order to allow two persons, irrespective of their sex, to get married. The constitution was amended by the insertion of Section 4 of Article 41, stating 'Marriage may be contracted in accordance with law by two persons without distinction as to their sex'. The proposal was put to the people in a referendum, and it was carried with 60% of the electorate voting, 62% voting Yes and 38% voting No.

== Marriage Act 2015 ==
The Thirty-fourth Amendment of the Constitution required the Oireachtas to pass a law allowing same-sex couples the right to get married. The Marriage Act 2015 fulfils this requirement and commenced on 16 November 2015. Same-sex couples who wish to marry will have to give 3 months' notice, the same as opposite-sex couples. Same-sex couples who entered a civil partnership will remain in that civil partnership. Same-sex couples who are already in a civil partnership can get married by giving 5 days' notice. Should any couple in a civil partnership get married, then their civil partnership is dissolved. Same-sex couples who got married abroad have had their marriages recognised since 16 November 2015. Since the coming into legal effect of the Marriage Act 2015, same-sex couples are not allowed to enter into a civil partnership in Ireland. The first same-sex couple to get married did so on 17 November 2015. The situation regarding same-sex couples who enter into a civil partnership abroad since 16 November 2015 is unclear as to whether their relationship will be recognised as marriage or as a civil partnership.

== Equality (Miscellaneous Provisions) Act 2015 ==
This act is an omnibus piece of legislation and amends various unrelated laws. This act amends Section 37.1. Section 37.1, as previously worded, granted a religious institution that provides religious, educational, or medical services the right to legally discriminate against its employees to uphold its ethos. Given that some hospitals and many nursing homes, as well as 98% of primary schools and 52% of secondary schools, are run by religious organisations, a gay or lesbian teacher, doctor or nurse could have been discriminated against as their sexual orientation could have been seen to undermine the ethos of the school or hospital. This act narrows the scope of Section 37.1. It requires that any employer who wishes to use Section 37.1 must satisfy three tests. These tests are that (1) religion is a genuine occupational requirement of the position, (2) the action is objectively justified, and (3) the means of achieving the aim are appropriate and necessary. Any action to take place under Section 37.1 must be about the conduct of the employee and not about their sexual orientation. Also, employees who work in religiously run institutions have a right to privacy.

== European Communities (Free Movement of Persons) Regulations 2015 ==
This regulation transposes the EU Directive 2004/38/EC into Irish law. This provides an updated regulation on the right of residency. The Regulations facilitate entry and residence for EU citizens and their family members. The Regulations also provide for a wider definition of "family member", to include a partner with whom the EU citizen has a durable relationship, duly attested, and the dependent parents, children under 21 and other dependent children of that partner. This does not involve the recognition of such partnerships for other purposes.

== International Protection Act 2015 ==
A person can claim asylum based on fear of prosecution arising from their sexual orientation.

== LGBT Youth Strategy ==
As part of its programme for government, the newly elected minority government has promised to devise an LGBT Youth Strategy. The strategy is to focus on equality of opportunities, education, preventative health care, and support services. The Programme for Government states, 'We will develop an LGBT Youth Strategy that will encompass education, youth services, mental health and other issues. As part of this strategy, we will review the implementation of the National Action Plan on Bullying in our schools.' The Minister for Children, Katherine Zappone, in May 2016, stated that she hoped the LGBT Youth Strategy would be published in one year's time.

== Paternity Leave and Benefit Act 2016 ==
This extends paternity leave from 3 days to 2 weeks. It allows paternity leave to be combined with maternity leave and adoptive leave in certain tragic circumstances. Same-sex couples are treated the same as opposite-sex couples.

== Modification of the Blood Ban 2016 ==
Ireland introduced a ban on all men who have sex with men from donating blood. It was a ban for life. This ban was introduced in 1985 at the height of the AIDS crisis. The Minister for Health announced that the ban will be eased in light of evidence that has emerged in recent decades. Men who have sex with men will be able to donate blood provided they have abstained from sexual intercourse for at least one year. Men who have a history of sexually transmitted diseases will have to wait for five years to donate. This measure has been welcomed as a progressive step by GLEN (Gay and Lesbian Equality Network); however, they note that the new measure still discriminates against men who are in a committed and sexually active relationship. Others have criticised the ban as not based on science, and that the deferral period is too long and still reinforces stigma on gay men and MSM people.

== Adoption (Amendment) Act 2017 ==
This act legislates for the 31st Amendment of the Constitution (Children) Act 2012. The act allows civil partners and same-sex married couples the right to apply for adoption. Children in long-term foster care can be adopted, and step-parents may apply to adopt their spouses' children. Civil partners were given the right to apply for adoption under the Child and Family Relationships Act 2015.

== Domestic Violence Act 2018 ==
The purpose of this Act is to amend and consolidate the law in relation to domestic violence. This Act consolidates the provisions contained in the Domestic Violence Act 1996, the Domestic Violence (Amendment) Act 2002 and relevant provisions of the Civil Partnership and Certain Rights and Obligations of Cohabitants Act 2010, the Civil Law (Miscellaneous Provisions) Act 2011, the Courts and Civil Law (Miscellaneous Provisions) Act 2013 and the Children and Family Relationships Act 2015. This Act also includes new provisions which must be enacted in order for Ireland to be able to ratify the Council of Europe Convention on preventing and combating violence against women and domestic violence, more commonly known as the Istanbul Convention. Ireland signed the Istanbul Convention in November 2015. These new provisions include allowing a person to apply for an emergency barring order where that person has lived in an intimate and committed relationship with the respondent without being their spouse or civil partner or where that person is the parent of an adult respondent, and the inclusion of a provision to criminalise forced marriage. This Act also removes the underage marriage exemption in order to help to protect minors against forced marriage, as requiring both intended spouses to be at least 18 should assist in ensuring that potential spouses have the maturity to withstand parental or other pressure to marry a particular person.

== Apology for Persons Convicted of Consensual Same-sex Acts: Motion ==
This motion was passed by the Oireachtas on 19 June 2018. The motion was moved by the Taoiseach Leo Varakadar. The motion apologised to all men convicted under the law that criminalised same-sex acts. The State acknowledges that it was wrong to criminalise and prosecute men. The motion also acknowledged the chilling effect these laws had on the wider LGBT community in creating and fostering social stigma.

== Education (Admission to Schools) Act 2018 ==
This act concerns the admission policy for primary, post-primary, and third-level educational institutions. It prohibits educational institutions from refusing a pupil entry on a number of grounds, including sexual orientation. It prohibits Catholic-run schools from giving preference to baptised Catholics over non-baptised children. However, religious-run schools that are of a minority religion can continue to refuse admission to a pupil if they are not of the same religion as the school. Such minority religions are the Church of Ireland (Anglican), Muslim, Jewish and so on. At the moment, 89% of state-funded primary schools are Catholic-run and 52% of state-funded post-primary schools are religious-run. This means that on religious grounds, many students could face discrimination. This has proved to be controversial for students and parents who have no religion and for the Catholic Church. The Act has been commenced, and from 1 September 2019, Catholic schools may not refuse admission on the grounds of baptism.

== Children and Family Relationship (Amendment) Act 2018 ==
This act modifies Parts 2 and 3 of the Children and Family Relationship Act 2015, which have not yet commenced. Parts 2 and 3 of the principal act deal with surrogacy. This amending bill makes minor technical changes which would allow some families who have conceived their children by surrogacy to gain legal recognition of their children in limited circumstances.

== Social Welfare, Pensions and Civil Registration Act 2018 ==
This Act brings into effect many of the social welfare changes announced in Budget 2018. In addition, in a move anticipated by the Minister before the budget, a provision has been inserted in the Act which clarifies the survivor pension rights of same-sex couples.

Some pension schemes grant a survivor pension only to the spouse of an employee who married their spouse either before retirement or upon reaching a particular age (e.g., 60). LGBT employees who had retired before the introduction of Marriage Equality in 2015 and who were unable to marry their partners at that time lost the benefit.

A change in the law to benefit older LGBT people was supported by all parties.

The ameliorating provision in the Act provides that if the retired employee was in a committed relationship with a same-sex partner at the time they retired or reached a particular age and then married that partner within 3 years of the enactment of the Marriage Act 2015, they are deemed to be eligible for a survivor pension on the payment of the appropriate contributions. The provision is not retrospective, as the committed relationship referred to in the Act is not itself recognised as a marriage by the State. (The Act resolves, inter alia, the issue in the David Parris case. The Act has similar provisions for civil partners.

== Civil Registration Act 2019 ==
This act has a number of unrelated provisions. One of the provisions is to make technical changes to the law to allow some female couples to have their details registered in the register of births, where they have a child in common. This bill applies only to female couples who conceive in an Irish fertility clinic using an identifiable donor. Male couples are excluded from this bill, as are couples where a person in the relationship is undergoing a gender transition. Same-sex couples who use a donor from abroad or use surrogacy are not recognised.

== Parental Leave and Benefit Act 2019 ==
Due to an anomaly in the law, male same-sex couples were not able to receive adoption leave and benefits, although they were allowed to apply to adopt children. This law corrects that anomaly. This law gave parental leave to all couples (opposite sex, same sex, married, civil partnered, cohabiting) who have a child by natural means or who are having a child through donor conception. Adoption leave is 24 weeks of leave from work, paid through social welfare, in order to allow a prospective parent to bond with their newly adopted child.

== National LGBTI+ Inclusion Strategy 2019 ==
Following the Youth Strategy, a National Strategy was developed and launched for 2019 – 2021. As part of its vision, four thematic pillars were developed in which LGBTI+ people are visible and included, treated equally, healthy, safe, and supported. The strategy covers a wide range of government departments and agencies. A committee comprising government departments, agencies, NGOs, and LGBTI+ representative organisations will oversee the implementation of the strategy.

== Criminal Justice (Hate Offences) Act 2024 ==
Ireland was unusual in not having a comprehensive hate-crimes law. There was a previous piece of legislation on incitement to hatred, but that was very narrow in scope and hard to implement. The new law provides for an increased prison sentence for certain crimes (e.g. assault, damage to property, etc.) when it is proven that they were motivated by hatred. Sexual orientation is listed as one of the grounds. In the original version of the law, hate speech was included as well, but it proved controversial on freedom of speech grounds, so it was removed from the act.

== International Protection Act 2026 ==
This law was introduced to transpose the EU regulations on immigration into Irish law. Immigration has become a topical issue in politics. The act speeds up the processing of immigration and refugee claims and outlines how to handle rejected applications and deportations. Some have welcomed this change in the law, while others feel it does not go far enough, and others feel it goes too far. People can still claim refugee status on the basis of sexual orientation under this act.

== Criminal Law, Civil Law and Defence (Miscellaneous Provisions) Bill, 2026 ==
Prior to the decriminalisation of male-to-male sexual acts, many men were convicted under Irish law. This had a detrimental effect on their lives. Under this bill, any man who has a conviction of buggery or gross indecency can apply to have their conviction disregarded. The male-to-male acts must have been consensual at the time and over the current age of consent of 17. Once a man previously convicted makes an application, the conviction will be reviewed. Family members can apply on behalf of men convicted under the law, where the man in question is dead. The rest of the bill addresses unrelated matters of civil and defence law.

== See also ==
- LGBT rights in the Republic of Ireland
- List of LGBT rights by region
- Recognition of same-sex unions in Ireland
- Homosexuality laws of the world
- List of acts of the Oireachtas

== Sources ==
- Lacey, Brian (2008). Terrible Queer Creatures: Homosexuality in Irish History. Dublin.
