= Society for Evidence-Based Gender Medicine =

Group opposing gender-affirming care

Society for Evidence-Based Gender Medicine (SEGM)
- Abbreviation: SEGM
- Established: 2019; 7 years ago
- Type: Nonprofit
- Affiliations: Genspect
- Website: segm.org

The Society for Evidence-Based Gender Medicine (SEGM) is an anti-trans organization that is known for its opposition to gender-affirming care for transgender youth and for engaging in political lobbying. SEGM is known for transgender health care misinformation. It has falsely claimed that the majority of transgender children desist, argued that gender exploratory therapy should be the first line treatment for those under 25, and promoted the scientifically unsupported theory of rapid-onset gender dysphoria. SEGM is often cited in anti-transgender legislation and court cases, sometimes filing court briefs.

SEGM is closely affiliated with Genspect and Therapy First. Seven advisors to SEGM are on Genspect's team of advisors, including Stella O'Malley, Genspect's founder. The Southern Poverty Law Center has designated SEGM and Genspect as anti-LGBTQ+ hate groups since 2023 and described SEGM as "a hub of pseudoscience". Researchers at the Yale School of Medicine issued a report which described SEGM as a small group of anti-trans activists and not "a recognized scientific organization". A spokesperson for the Endocrine Society described them as outside the medical mainstream. A paper published in March 2024 described them as a "fringe medical organization".

== Leadership and founding ==
The Society for Evidence-based Gender Medicine (SEGM) was founded in 2019 as an international group of clinicians and researchers. Its co-founders include William Malone, an American endocrinologist; Julia Mason, an American pediatrician; and Zhenya Abbruzzese, an American healthcare researcher. Psychiatrist Stephen B. Levine, who has testified in nearly every case on gender-affirming care in the United States and argues transgender people become pathologically narcissistic, is an advisor. SEGM, among other affiliated groups, was formed through connections in the "Pediatric and Adolescent Gender Dysphoria Working Group", a group of 17 academics and researchers including Kenneth Zucker, Ray Blanchard, and J. Michael Bailey. Several SEGM members collaborated with the CAMH Gender Identity Clinic which was directed by Zucker.

A report by the Southern Poverty Law Center described SEGM as a hub of the "anti-LGBT pseudoscience network", and specified that the relationship was strongest between SEGM, Genspect, and Therapy First, who shared over 24 personnel connections. The report also stated SEGM members are affiliated with the "anti-LGBTQ+ far right". Julia Mason, Marcus Evans, Roberto D'Angelo, Sasha Ayad, Stella O'Malley, Lisa Marchiano, and Avi Ring are advisors for SEGM and are on Genspect's team or advisors; O'Malley is the founder of Genspect. Therapy First is a group of therapists founded in 2021 by four SEGM members and a Genspect advisor to market, gender exploratory therapy, which experts believe is transgender conversion therapy. Marchiano and O'Malley are on the board of Lisa Littman's Institute for Comprehensive Gender Dysphoria Research (ICGDR). SEGM members O'Malley and Robert P. George are also advisors to the Foundation Against Intolerance and Racism.

A report by seven people in various departments of the Yale School of Medicine stated that the 14 core members of SEGM regularly worked together on the boards of other organizations that oppose gender-affirming healthcare and "feature biased and unscientific content."

== Activities ==
=== Advocacy and legislative activities ===
SEGM funds systematic reviews, organizes academic events, and occasionally submits positions to courts and lawmakers. Yale University's Integrity Project estimated that 75% of SEGM's publications are letters to the editor and comments, as opposed to peer-reviewed scientific articles. SEGM frequently testifies in state legislatures in favor of anti-trans laws.

South Dakota House Bill 1057, which was launched in 2020 to prohibit gender-affirming care for transgender youth, relied on a document created and distributed within a secret working group including multiple members of the American College of Pediatricians (ACPeds), representatives from other conservative groups, and founders of SEGM. SEGM members have repeatedly co-authored papers and letters to the editor with members of ACPeds. SEGM director Julia Mason tweeted that SEGM would not work with members of ACPeds and denied knowing ACPeds member Paul Hruz despite co-authoring papers and co-hosting symposia with him. ACPeds has explicitly promoted the work of SEGM; Quentin Van Meter encouraged audience members to work with SEGM at a conference held by "ex-gay" ministry First Stone Ministries.

SEGM made a submission in defense of the state of Arizona's ban on Medicaid coverage for transgender healthcare. Lambda Legal and Cooley LLP filed an amicus brief opposing the ban on behalf of LGBT advocacy organizations such as PFLAG. The Pediatric Endocrine Society and the World Professional Association for Transgender Health also filed amicus briefs opposing the ban. SEGM members also contributed expert defense testimony to Florida's ban on medicaid for transgender healthcare.

In March 2022, Julia Mason, a board member of SEGM who also works with Genspect, proposed Resolution 27 along with four other members of the American Academy of Pediatrics (AAP), stating the AAP should reconsider hormone therapy as a first line of treatment and called for an evidence review to update AAP's 2018 policy statement on gender affirmative care. The AAP said that the resolution mischaracterized its policy, which instead promotes "following a systematic, collaborative evaluation by clinicians and mental health professionals". The resolution was not passed. After the resolution's proposers said that the AAP changed procedures to block discussion of the resolution, the AAP said that their processes worked normally and that Resolution 27 did not pass because it received no co-sponsorship and the majority of AAP members did not agree with the resolution. The AAP stated the guidelines were already under review as part of a routine procedure and that "there is strong consensus among the most prominent medical organizations worldwide that evidence-based, gender-affirming care for transgender children and adolescents is medically necessary and appropriate".

In April, the Florida Department of Health wrote a memo which misrepresented the scientific consensus to stop minors in the state from socially or medically transitioning and cited Malone. The same month, SEGM met with White House officials in the Office of Information and Regulatory Affairs to argue that a rule on "nondiscrimination in health programs and activities" from the Department of Health and Human Services' Office for Civil Rights would "effectively force physicians to provide hormonal and surgical interventions".

In September 2023, SEGM members and advisors filed a petition with the U.S. Food and Drug Administration calling for them to end prescriptions of puberty blockers to transgender youth. SEGM claims to have over 100 members but removed their membership list and organizational structure from the site in late 2023.

In 2025, SEGM co-founder Zhenya Abbruzzese co-authored the Trump Administration's HHS report on gender dysphoria.

=== McMaster University systematic reviews ===
Between 2021 and 2024, SEGM gave a team at McMaster University headed by Gordon Guyatt, a pioneer in evidence-based medicine, $250,000 to conduct independent systematic reviews into trans healthcare. SEGM was involved in choosing the question for each of the reviews. The reviews were published in 2025. The reviews "graded the evidence for each intervention as having either low or very low certainty." Following their publication, the studies received criticism from people who questioned their veracity due to SEGM's involvement.

The results of the reviews were quickly seized by anti-trans activists, right-wing news outlets and the Trump Administration to justify questioning and restricting gender-affirming care. Guyatt claimed he had written to several news outlets that prominently cited the reviews to tell them "You are misconstruing how my work should be interpreted and used". However, all of the outlets refused to publish his letters.

In July 2025, an opinion piece by professors at the university called on the university to distance themselves from the reviews. In August 2025, Guyatt and his team released a statement asserting that using the reviews to deny care was a "gross misuse of our work and is unconscionable" and that while SEGM initially "appeared to us as non-trans, cisgender researchers to be legitimately evidence-based", they would no longer work with them in the future. The statement continued to say it was "profoundly misguided to cast health care based on low-certainty evidence as bad care or as care driven by ideology", with Guyatt saying "low quality evidence doesn't mean it doesn't work. It means we don't know." Guyatt additionally criticized anti-trans activists for using the report to claim that is it unknown if anyone benefits from gender-affirming care, saying that whether some people are harmed by gender-affirming care is just as unknown, but that due to the testimonies of people who have undergone the treatments, there is "sufficient evidence to say there are some people who are benefited".

=== Conversion therapy ===
The Trans Safety Network stated "SEGM's public members include ... outspoken critics of regulation against conversion therapy on transgender people." The SPLC has stated SEGM is part of a network of groups which "support conversion therapy for transgender people and banning medical transition, beginning with people under age 25".

SEGM submitted a brief on a proposed amendment to a Canadian criminal code outlawing conversion therapy, attempts to change gender identity or sexual orientation. SEGM stated that "There is a very real risk that all forms of supportive and explorative psychotherapies for young patients who present with gender dysphoria will be classified as 'conversion'", and justified their position by claiming that conversion therapy can only be applied to lesbian, gay, and bisexual people, a position not supported by any major medical organization.

== Positions ==
SEGM advocates for psychotherapy, including exploratory psychotherapy, as the first-line treatment for those age 25 and under, even though evidence does not support it. SEGM no longer believes medical interventions to be appropriate at any age. Malone has opposed the informed consent model for transgender healthcare, where adults older than 18 can start hormones after signing an informed consent document without requiring an evaluation by a mental health professional.

SEGM believes that psychological support should be offered as an alternative treatment and cites health policies in Sweden, Finland and the U.K as supporting this, though evidence for psychotherapy as a treatment for gender dysphoria is weak.

SEGM has advanced the controversial idea of rapid-onset gender dysphoria (ROGD), which suggests a subtype of gender dysphoria caused by peer influence and social contagion. ROGD has been described as lacking evidence or sound empirical studies by the majority of major psychological bodies in the USA.

== Citations in anti-trans legislation ==
Proponents of gender-affirming care bans often cite letters to the editors of scientific journals from leaders and members of SEGM Multiple letters were co-authored by SEGMs board secretary since inception, William J Malone, and members of the American College of Pediatricians such as Quentin Van Meter, Paul Hruz, and Michael Laidlaw.

In March 2020, SEGM was cited in an Idaho bill barring transgender people from changing their sex on their birth certificate. A SEGM spokesperson said they never expressed support for the bill. The legislation stated SEGM "has declared that the conflation of sex and gender in health care is alarming, subjects hundreds of thousands of individuals to the risk of unintended medical harm, and will greatly impede medical research" without providing evidence for the claims. The ACLU condemned the state for their actions. Malone also testified to the legislature in favor of a bill that would make it a felony to prescribe hormone blockers to people under 18 or refer them to gender-reassignment surgery.

In Texas, reports from SEGM were used to justify the Governor's directive that the state department of family and protective services investigate the parents of all children accessing gender-affirming care and treat the cases as child abuse.

== Reception ==
=== Trans advocacy community ===
Much of the response within the trans advocacy community has been critical of SEGM.

In August 2021, Trans Safety Network described SEGM as "an anti-trans psychiatric and sociological think tank" and fringe group and reported that most of SEGM's funding in 2019 came in donations greater than $10,000. In 2020, SEGM received a $100,000 donation from the Edward Charles Foundation, and in 2021 SEGM's annual revenue grew to nearly $800,000, the largest of which was a $350,000 donation from Fidelity Investments Charitable Gift Fund. One of SEGM's major donors, a California woman, self-described non-religious feminist and supporter of Barack Obama and Hillary Clinton, told Undark Magazine she likely contributed to SEGM via the Edward Charles Foundation but chose to remain anonymous due to fear of harassment.

In 2023, US lawyer and transgender rights activist Alejandra Caraballo described SEGM as "the most prominent of the pseudo-scientific organizations in the anti-trans space" and stated they use "teach the controversy" tactics and cite the results of their advocacy efforts in the United Kingdom NHS and Swedish Karolinska Hospital to build momentum to restrict care for trans youth globally.

The Southern Poverty Law Center wrote in 2023 that "Since its founding, members of SEGM have undertaken a global media and public policy blitz to challenge the affirming care model, advocate against gender-affirming care, and lend scientific credibility to legal claims against LGBTQ+ civil rights." The Southern Poverty Law Center added SEGM and Genspect to its list of anti-LGBTQ+ hate groups in its 2023 "Year in Hate & Extremism" Report.

GLAAD described SEGM as "known for mischaracterizing standards of care for transgender youth and engaging in political lobbying using misinformation which contradicts the evidence base around transgender healthcare."

Former US Professional Association for Transgender Health (USPATH) president, clinical psychologist, and transgender woman, Dr. Erica Anderson described SEGM as the most important group of clinicians and scientists working in youth gender medicine adding, "the group does not exist so much to oppose gender-affirming care as to determine the best approach to gender-questioning youth."

=== Medical community ===
In April 2021, Medscape Medical News asked Joshua Safer – an endocrinologist from Mount Sinai Hospital acting as a spokesperson for the Endocrine Society on transgender issues – about SEGM, SEGM member Will Malone, and their concerns about treatment for transgender youth, he stated: "This is a relatively small group that has been making the same arguments for a number of years, and they are very much outside the mainstream".

In March 2022, SEGM funded a paper by Stephen Levine, Zhenya Abbruzzese, and Julia Mason titled "Reconsidering Informed Consent for Trans-Identified Children, Adolescents, and Young Adults" which appeared in the Journal of Sex & Marital Therapy. The paper questioned the quality of the evidence base for paediatric and adolescent gender-affirming care, and the process of establishing informed consent, which they suggested suffered from "erroneous professional assumptions; poor quality of the initial evaluations; and inaccurate and incomplete information shared with patients and their parents". In June, the journal published four invited responses from academics. Two responses, one of which was authored by a SEGM affiliated academic, agreed with the paper, while the other two offered criticism. A critical response by Annelou de Vries stated the current evidence base supported gender-affirming interventions and that the Dutch protocol had always included careful assessment including mental health, family environment and capacity for informed consent. A response by Jack Drescher compared SEGM to the National Association for Research & Therapy of Homosexuality (NARTH), a prominent conversion therapy advocacy organization focused on opposition to lesbian and gay rights, and questioned whether SEGM was "following a parallel path regarding transgender rights". In a further reply in 2023, Levine, Abbruzzese and Mason criticised Drescher's commentary for referencing "an anonymous libelous blog" and making "baseless insinuations by inventing a non-existent association between SEGM and anti-homosexual groups".

In April 2022, researchers at the Yale School of Medicine issued a report in response to the attacks on transgender healthcare in Arizona and Texas which described SEGM as "an ideological organization without apparent ties to mainstream scientific or professional organizations", and help lawmakers criminalize transgender care.

In October 2022, writing in Science-Based Medicine, AJ Eckert described SEGM as a "transphobic organization" which is closely affiliated with Genspect, who they described as "an anti-trans gender critical (GC) organization", and stated they "both regularly peddle anti-trans pseudoscience". Referring to 2019 statements from Malone that "No child is born in the wrong body, but for a variety of reasons some children and adolescents become convinced that they were" in a Christian Post interview, and that "counseling can resolve any trauma or thought processes that have caused them to desire an opposite sexed body" in a Quillette article with fellow SEGM member Colin Wright, Eckert opined that the statements were "transphobic and reductive" and favor a model where children are encouraged to live as their sex assigned at birth. Eckert indicated that the American Academy of Pediatrics have said that "conversion" or "reparative" treatment models such as this are used to deter youth from displaying non-cisgender identities or expressions, and the Substance Abuse and Mental Health Services Administration has said that any therapeutic interventions that seek to change a youth's gender identity or expression are inappropriate and may cause harm.

Kaiser Health News while fact checking a political campaign ad by America First Legal, said the leaders of SEGM are "wholly skeptical of the acceleration in gender-affirming care".

Gordon Guyatt, who is considered a founder of the field of evidence-based medicine, has criticized SEGM. In 2024, he said that much clinical practice relies on low-certainty evidence, that SEGM places a low value on patient autonomy, and that SEGM tries to have it both ways by claiming to have not made up their minds while taking a position against gender-affirming care. In 2025, after the McMaster Faculty released a statement critical of SEGM, he stated SEGM "struck me as very misguided in effectively putting a very low or zero value on patient autonomy and ready to impose on patients their own assessments of the merit of choosing to receive or not receive (the therapies)".

=== Media ===
In August 2022, Vice News characterized William Malone as an "anti-trans activist" and stated that SEGM use the same tactics and citations as a Florida Department of Health memo, which claimed to provide a scientific basis for banning gender-affirming care and had been criticized by USPATH, a regional chapter of the World Professional Association for Transgender Health. Vice reached out to authors cited in the memo, who said it took their research out of context as the research, and later research, supported gender-affirming care.

BuzzFeed News said SEGM "effectively accomplished for gender dysphoria what anti-vaxxer medical professionals have sought to do for their cause: give credence to the notion that no scientific or medical consensus exists regarding the relative safety and efficacy of a given treatment, despite the clear and growing evidence to the contrary."

=== Academia ===
In March 2024, a paper examining the scientists, clinicians, and political organizations that promote bans on gender-affirming care described SEGM as a "fringe medical association". In 2025, Washington State University canceled or withdrew its accreditation for a continuing medical education course using SEGM materials, following a complaint.

== See also ==
- Standards of Care for the Health of Transgender and Gender Diverse People
- Healthcare and the LGBT community
- 2020s anti-LGBTQ movement in the United States
- 21st-century anti-trans movement in the United Kingdom
