= Code of practice for services, public functions and associations =

United Kingdom statutory code of practice

The Code of practice for services, public functions and associations is a statutory code of practice issued by the Equality and Human Rights Commission (EHRC), a non-departmental public body in Great Britain, which is the regulator of the Equality Act 2010. It was first published in 2011 and updated in August 2026.

== Statutory background ==
The Equality and Human Rights Commission (EHRC) was established by the Equality Act 2006 (EA 2006), an act of the Parliament of the United Kingdom. The Commission has responsibility for the promotion and enforcement of equality and non-discrimination laws in England, Scotland and Wales.

The publication of statutory codes of practice are governed by section 14 of the EA 2006, which permits the ECHR to issue guidance "in connection with any matter addressed by the Equality Act 2010". These matters include and have given rise to published codes of practice in regard to services, employment, and equal pay, among other areas.

Under the section, the ECHR must perform a consultation on its proposed code; submit the draft to the Minister for Women and Equalities for approval; following which the Minister will lay a copy before Parliament; such that the code will come into force if Parliament does not disapprove of it by resolution within 40 days.

== 2026 update on definition of sex ==
In 2025, the Supreme Court ruled in For Women Scotland Ltd v The Scottish Ministers that the definition of "man", "woman", and "sex" as used in the 2010 Equality Act referred strictly to "biological sex" and did not include transgender persons, even if they had a gender recognition certificate. Following the decision, Kishwer Falkner, chair of the Equality and Human Rights Commission (EHRC), stated that its upcoming code of practice will recognise the ruling by excluding trans women from single-sex spaces, including women's sports and changing spaces, and that the NHS would "have to change" its policy of treating transgender patients in accordance with their declared gender. EHRC commissioner Akua Reindorf spoke after the judgment in a personal capacity and stated that trans people "have been lied to over many years" regarding their level of rights, and that they must accept a perceived reduction in rights for the sake of "correction" because "other people have rights".

On 25 April 2025, the EHRC released an interim updated guidance in response to the ruling, stating that trans men and trans women would be recognised only as "biological women" and "biological men" respectively. As such, single-sex spaces must exclude trans people of a different "biological sex" than that of the single-sex space. This restriction applied to public toilets, schools, workplaces, sporting bodies, publicly accessible services (such as restaurants, shops, hospitals, or shelters), and any association of 25 people or more. The guidance also stated that where a trans person could be perceived as belonging to another sex, they may further be restricted from joining single-sex spaces of their "biological sex". Trans men who appeared as men may be restricted from women-only spaces, and trans women who appeared as women may be restricted from men-only spaces. The guidance, however, say that trans people should not be left without any facilities to use, although it stated that it may be discriminatory against women to provide only mixed-sex spaces in some cases. The guidance also stated that transgender men and women should be barred from gay men's spaces and lesbian spaces respectively.

After the interim guidance was released, House of Commons' Women and Equalities Committee wrote to Falkner asking for the consultation period to be extended and for the process to not ignore the needs of transgender people. One EHRC source stated that most staff, including senior ones and those who work with sex and gender, were not notified or consulted about the interim guidance before it was published. In mid-May 2025, the EHRC extended its consultation period from two to six weeks following internal and external criticism. In October 2025 the EHRC withdrew the interim guidance, stating that the new full draft guidance had been submitted to the Minister, and was awaiting approval.

Revised guidance was laid before Parliament on 21 May 2026, with 40 days for legislators to raise concerns before becoming statute. The new code covered facilities and services open to the public, but not staff facilities, with guidance relating to that to be published at a later date. The guidance reaffirmed that single-sex spaces should only be used on the basis of biological sex, but that a third or gender-neutral space may be required for transgender people to use, as in the case of toilets.

=== Criticism ===
In the Equality Impact Assessment, the Office of Equality and Opportunity says that there are concerns of "double exclusion", where it is possible that trans people are barred from both the space aligned with their gender and the space aligned with their birth sex, effectively leaving them with no service at all. Their assessment is the likely impact on trans people is negative. There are also concerns of "policing of gender", which could lead to increased harassment for trans people and cisgender people who do not conform to traditional gender stereotypes.

A report published on the British anti-trans movement by Amnesty International that same month identified the EHRC's guidance as a major event in the progression of said movement. On 16 May, the Good Law Project sent a letter before action to the EHRC, stating their guidance "authorises and approves unlawful discrimination" and they would "be challenging that guidance on the basis that it is irrational and/or wrong in law". They further stated that if the EHRC interpretation was correct, it would place the UK in breach of the Human Rights Act 1998. The case was heard at the High Court in November 2025, with advocacy group Sex Matters allowed to present an intervention. The judgement was deferred to a late date.

The EHRC interim guidance was described by transgender campaigners as a "bigoted attempt to segregate trans people in public spaces", with campaign groups warning about forced outing and harmful effects on trans lives, and stating it could be in violation of the European Convention on Human Rights. The Green Party co-leaders issued a statement that the guidance was "ill-considered and impractical" and "could put trans people at risk of discrimination in the workplace, and is overly prescriptive in a way that seems to fly in the face of the tolerance that we value in this country". They stated "it doesn't seem right that a lesbian organisation or space that wants to include trans women should be prevented from doing so".

Ahead of the International Day Against Homophobia, Biphobia and Transphobia on 17 May, 23 Pride organisations in Scotland issued a joint statement that they were "deeply alarmed by the escalation in the demonisation of LGBTQIA+ people, particularly trans individuals, both at home and abroad", stating that the ruling and EHRC interim guidance are a "serious threat to the rights of trans people". They further criticised "the influence of the anti-LGBTQIA+ lobby in both the UK and Scottish Governments"

In June, an estimated 900 trans people and their supporters (including Kate Nash) demonstrated at Parliament in June, seeking to meet with MPs to advocate against anti-trans positions. According to Diva, the protest surpassed the number of demonstrators who protested against section 28 in the 1980s.

In late June, leading UK trans groups issued a joint letter to the Council of Europe's Committee on Legal Affairs and Human Rights to express their "grave concerns" over current UK trans rights policies, specifically criticising the EHRC and arguing they violated the European Convention on Human Rights. In July, TransLuscent requested the Global Alliance of National Human Rights Institutions investigate the EHRC, arguing its conduct following the ruling had been unlawful and in violation of the Paris Principles.

On 30 June 2025, the Lemkin Institute for Genocide Prevention issued a Red Flag Alert for the genocide of transgender and intersex people in the United Kingdom, noting similarities of the UK's policy to the 9th Pattern of Genocide. The institute believe that "the practical repercussions for trans and intersex individuals are clear and serious" and that: "If the guidance does become law, it would make transition impossible in the UK. Life as a transitioned person would become unbearable".

In a press release issued on 17 August 2026, the Office of the United Nations High Commissioner for Human Rights stated that the code of practice, in its revised form which came into effect the same month, "may place transgender and gender-diverse persons at heightened risk of discrimination and exclusion".

=== Impact ===
On 29 June 2025 Keir Starmer stated that he "welcomed the ruling and everything else flows from that", adding that "all guidance of whatever kind needs to be consistent with the ruling and we need to get to that position as soon as possible". British Transport Police confirmed that the strip-search policy would be so that trans women in custody who required to be strip searched would have this done by male officers. Both the House of Commons and Scottish Parliamentary Corporate Body announced that unisex toilet facilities in Westminster and Holyrood would only be allowed to persons of the corresponding biological sex, with trans people also being able to use gender-neutral and accessible toilets. In December 2025, the Labour Party barred trans women from taking part in the formal proceedings of their women's conference in 2026.

Following the ruling and subsequent EHRC guidance, a number of sports clubs and bodies announced bans on transgender women playing in women's sports, including the Scottish Football Association banned transgender women from participating in women's football from the next season; The Football Association in England; England Netball; and the England and Wales Cricket Board. The Women's Institute and Girlguiding also announced that it could no longer allow trans women and girls to be members as a result of legal advice they received.

== See also ==
- Transgender rights in the United Kingdom
- Transgender people in sports
