= Akua Reindorf =

British lawyer

Akua Reindorf KC
- Occupation: Barrister
- Employer(s): Cloisters Chambers, London
- Known for: Equality, employment law and academic freedom

Akua Reindorf is a British barrister who specialises in employment law, discrimination and human rights law, academic freedom and freedom of speech in higher education. She was appointed King's Counsel in 2023. Sonia Sodha, writing in The Guardian, called her "an eminent human rights expert" and in Human Rights Quarterly as an expert in employment law. Although she joined the legal profession later than most KCs, Reindorf's impact is described in The Lawyer as "huge".

== Career ==
Reindorf qualified in 1999, and is an alumna of City University and of University of Sussex. She is a visiting senior fellow in practice at London School of Economics Law School.

Reindorf was a commissioner of the Equality and Human Rights Commission appointed in 2021 by Liz Truss and left the role in 2025. She worked as a Fee Paid Employment Judge in 2020, was Barrister of the Year in the Legal Business Awards in 2023, Employment Junior of the Year in the Chambers UK Bar Awards 2022 and one of The Lawyer’s Hot 100 for 2022.

Reindorf's work has included "challenging, hard-fought discrimination, harassment and whistleblowing cases", including reaching a landmark judgment in Puthenveettil v Alexander & George for a migrant domestic worker, which resulted in the government changing national minimum wage legislation, and she has led a number of cases regarding the defence of academic freedom and freedom of speech in universities. She produced the "Reindorf Report" for University of Essex into alleged no-platforming of two external speakers (Jo Phoenix and Rosa Freedman) who were accused of transphobia; her report was critical of Stonewall's employer Diversity Champions Scheme. Although the university was reluctant to publish the report, the Information Commissioner ruled that they should.

As a commissioner of the Equality and Human Rights commission, Reindorf has spoken about the need to ensure that services are designated as single-sex if they meet conditions set out in the Equality Act and about discrimination against disabled applicant for benefits. She has warned against expanding the definition of a woman because she believes it causes problems for the rights of women and LGB people. In reference to the Supreme Court ruling of 2025 in support of For Women Scotland, she believes the law is complex but the ruling is clear. She has raised concerns that people have been lied to about trans rights, and that Stonewall has given bad advice to organisations. Reindorf has said that she and Baroness Falkner had been appointed to the EHRC to overhaul the approach to Sex and Gender.

Reindorf has worked with Sex Matters, intervening at the Court of Appeal in Higgs v Farmor's School. She represented LGB Alliance in their challenge brought by the charity Mermaids, and for James Esses, in his Employment tribunal claim against the Metanoia Institute and the UK Council for Psychotherapy. Reindorf championed writer Julie Bindel in her case against Nottingham City Council after its library service cancelled a talk she was due to give on violence against women and girls and Almut Gadow in her claim for philosophical belief discrimination against the Open University.
