= LGB Alliance =

British advocacy group founded in 2019

- Formation: September 2019; 7 years ago
- Founders: Bev Jackson; Kate Harris; Ann Sinnott; Allison Bailey; Malcolm Clark
- Founded at: United Kingdom
- Type: Advocacy organisation, registered charity
- Registration no.: limited company: 12338881 registered charity: 1194148 (England and Wales)
- Legal status: Active
- Website: lgballiance.org.uk

The LGB Alliance is a British anti-transgender charity and advocacy group. It was founded in 2019 in opposition to the policies of LGBTQ rights charity Stonewall on transgender issues. Its founders are Bev Jackson, Kate Harris, Allison Bailey, Malcolm Clark and Ann Sinnott. The LGB Alliance argues that the rights of transgender people conflict with those of cisgender lesbians, bisexuals, and gay men and that same-sex attraction is endangered by the inclusion of trans people. The group has opposed a ban on conversion therapy that includes trans people in the UK, opposed the use of puberty blockers for children, and opposed gender recognition reform. The group intervened at the UK Supreme Court in the case of For Women Scotland Ltd v The Scottish Ministers, which ruled that the terms woman and sex in the Equality Act 2010 refer exclusively to biological sex.

The LGB Alliance has been described as transphobic, "anti-trans", "trans-exclusionary", a "hate group" and as part of an "anti-transgender movement" by scholars, politicians, LGBT organisations, human rights organisations, and others, including the Labour Campaign for Trans Rights and several Labour MPs.

The LGB Alliance was granted charitable status in April 2021, after the organisation agreed to revise its social media policies. A legal challenge against this decision was dismissed by a First-tier Tribunal in 2023 on the grounds the Appellant (Mermaids) lacked legal standing, with no finding made as to whether LGB Alliance should have been given charitable status.

== History ==
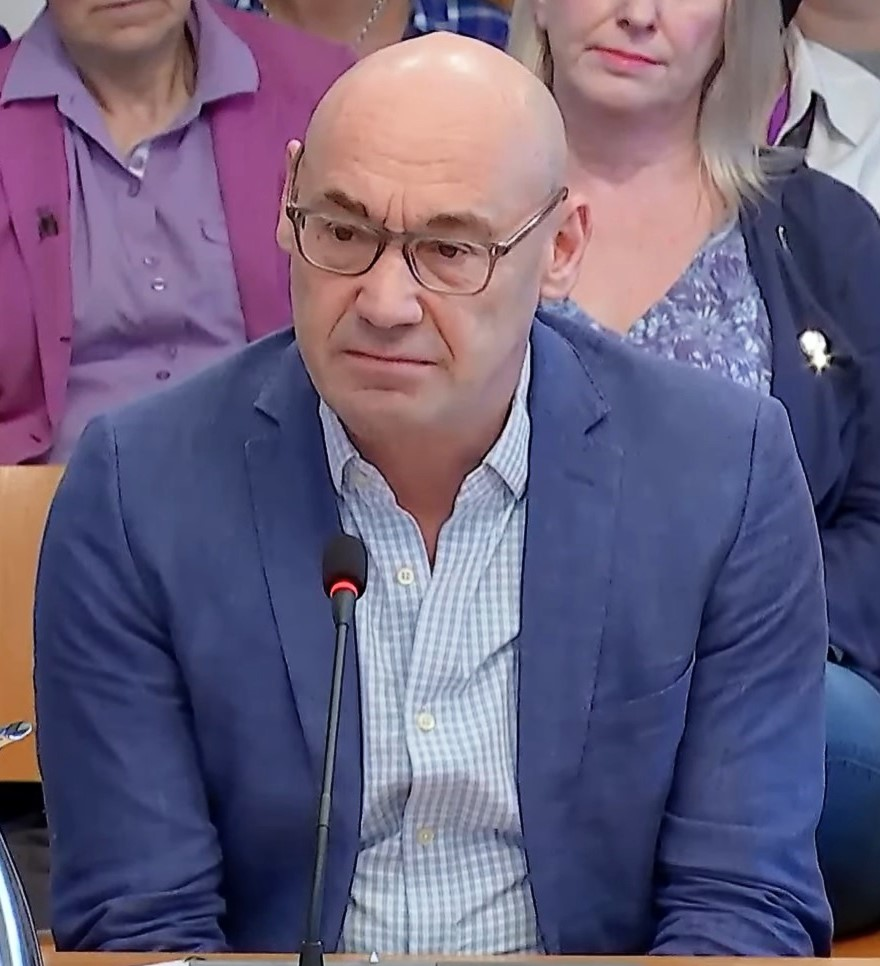
Malcolm Clark, a cofounder of the LGB Alliance, speaking to the Scottish Parliament in 2022.

In September 2019, twenty-two people signed an open letter to The Sunday Times accusing leading UK gay-rights charity Stonewall of having "undermined women's sex-based rights and protections" through its policy on transgender issues. It further stated that twelve months earlier, a group had asked Stonewall to commit to "fostering an atmosphere of respectful debate" with those who wished to question its transgender policies, but that Stonewall had refused to allow any such dialogue, and that "if Stonewall remains intransigent, there must surely now be an opening for a new organisation committed both to freedom of speech and to fact instead of fantasy."

One month after the publication of the open letter, it was announced that a new group called the LGB Alliance had been launched. The group was co-founded by Bev Jackson, Kate Harris, Allison Bailey, Malcolm Clark, and Ann Sinnott, with the support of Simon Fanshawe, who spoke at the initial meeting on 22 October 2019 along with Miranda Yardley and Charlie Evans. Harris stated that:

The main difference is that lesbians, gays, and bisexuals have something in common because of our sexual orientation, that has nothing to do with being trans. We welcome the support of anyone — gay, straight or trans — as long as they support our commitment to freedom of speech and biological definitions of sex. So we are a very broad and accepting group. We will be called transphobic, but we're not.

In 2020, the LGBT+ Consortium umbrella group refused to admit LGB Alliance.

In October 2020, Ann Sinnott, a director of the LGB Alliance at the time, initiated a legal case calling for a judicial review of the Equality and Human Rights Commission's guidance on the Equality Act 2010, crowdfunding almost £100,000 for legal fees. The LGB Alliance believed that the specifics of the Equality Act 2010 have been "misrepresented" by some organisations. In May 2021 the case was found by the court to be unarguable, Justice Henshaw stating that "the claimant has shown no arguable reason to believe the Code has misled or will mislead service providers about their responsibilities under the Act."

In June 2021, the LGB Alliance announced the appointment of five new trustees in addition to Harris, Jackson and documentary producer Malcolm Clark: co-founder of Shed Productions Eileen Gallagher OBE, strategy consultant Conrad Roebar, professor of philosophy Kathleen Stock OBE, professor of human rights law Robert Wintemute and Labour peer Lord Young of Norwood Green. At the same time, Ann Sinnott announced her resignation as a director.

In October 2021 the organisation had a stand at the Conservative Party Conference, which reportedly cost £6,000. Later that month, the organisation hosted its own conference, with guests including MPs Joanna Cherry (SNP), Jackie Doyle-Price (Conservative) and Rosie Duffield (Labour), as well as the television comedy writer and anti-trans activist Graham Linehan. A protest against LGB Alliance was held outside the conference venue, attended by Daniel Lismore and the King's College London LGBT+ Society.

On 30 March 2022 the London Community Foundation awarded the LGB Alliance a grant as part of the Arts Council England Let's Create Jubilee Fund, for a film Queens — 70 Years of Queer History. It withdrew the grant in April 2022, after being made aware of the legal challenge against the LGB Alliance's charitable status. The film was retitled "Very British Gays" and first shown in March 2023.

On 10 June 2022 the organisation announced that it had received a grant from the National Lottery Community Fund to create a helpline "for young lesbian, gay and bisexual people and their families and friends."

On 17 June 2024 the organisation announced that it had launched a live text-chat service for 13-24 year-old lesbians, gay men and bisexuals. According to PinkNews, the announcement of this service led to criticism and accusations of being "groomers" by gender-critical and anti-LGBTQ+ Twitter accounts, coupled with mockery from trans people and their allies focused on the fact that the LGB Alliance had itself used the slur against LGBTQ influencers in the past.

In October 2024 the organisation's annual conference was disrupted by thousands of crickets released by trans rights group Trans Kids Deserve Better. The conference included a speech by the actor James Dreyfus, who said "The current gender movement is undoubtedly the most homophobic movement I've witnessed since the early 80s".

LGB Alliance made a joint submission with The Lesbian Project and Scottish Lesbians to the UK Supreme Court in the case of For Women Scotland Ltd v The Scottish Ministers, arguing that the rights of same-sex attracted women would be affected if a Gender Recognition Certificate changed sex for the purposes of the Equality Act. The judgment found that sex and sexual orientation referred to biological sex for the purposes of the Equality Act, which CEO Kate Barker described as a "watershed for women and, in particular, lesbians who have seen their rights and identities steadily stolen from them over the last decade".

== Charitable status ==
In March 2020, the LGB Alliance submitted an application for charitable status to the Charity Commission for England and Wales. Bev Jackson, a founder of the LGB Alliance in a speech stated "We're applying for charitable status and building an organisation to challenge the dominance of those who promote the damaging theory of gender identity".

A petition set up against the application received 30,000 signatures. The commission found that LGBA made "inflammatory and offensive" social media posts and their messaging "appeared to involve, at times, demeaning or denigrating" remarks about the legal rights of transgender people. The Alliance agreed to revise its social media policies and the commission granted the application in April 2021, ruling that its aims could be charitable if they did not denigrate transgender rights.

After LGB Alliance was granted the status of charity, over 50 LGBT+ Pride and queer event organizers in the UK such as Pride in London and Bristol Pride signed an open letter condemning the decision, which quoted Pride in London to describe it as "a political campaign organisation with their main aim to remove trans people from our LGBT+ community and block trans rights".

In June 2021 an appeal against the Charity Commission's decision was filed by transgender youth charity Mermaids, supported by the Good Law Project, the LGBT+ Consortium, Gendered Intelligence, Trans Actual, and the LGBT Foundation. A First-tier Tribunal sat from 9 to 16 September 2022 and from 7 to 8 November 2022, with Mermaids, the Charity Commission and the LGB Alliance represented in court. The appeal was dismissed in July 2023 on the grounds that Mermaids lacked standing to bring the challenge the decision by the Charity Commission. There was no finding made on the question of whether LGB Alliance should have been given charitable status, with the two judges unable to reach agreement. The Charity Commission welcomed the result and repeated its position, that it "applied the law carefully and properly in registering LGB Alliance as a charity."

=== Regulatory issues ===
In August 2021, the Charity Commission announced that it would be engaging with LGB Alliance trustees after the LGB Alliance posted a Tweet stating that "adding the + to LGB gives the green light to paraphilias like bestiality – and more – to all be part of one big happy 'rainbow family,'" which was subsequently removed by Twitter for violating the social media platform's rules.

On 7 September 2022, the LGB Alliance was found by the Fundraising Regulator to have broken its Code of Fundraising Practice in two ways: firstly by making a "false and misleading" claim that it was the only charity representing lesbian, gay, and bisexual interests, and secondly by failing to deal correctly with a complaint made about this claim.

== Views ==
=== Gender identity ===
The LGB Alliance opposes the concept of gender identity. Its position is that homosexuality, previously understood as attraction to the same biological sex, has been repackaged by "gender ideologists" to refer to attraction to the same "gender identity", which has led to same-sex attracted children to think they are trans. Echoing arguments from Janice Raymond and The Transsexual Empire, the Alliance argues that lesbian transgender women are deceptively pursuing lesbians, denying "real" lesbians their own spaces.

Co-founder Bev Jackson said that lesbians are in danger of extinction due to disproportionate focus on transgender issues in schools: "At school, in university, it is so uncommon, it is the bottom of the heap. Becoming trans is now considered the brave option." She also voiced concern that "If you do not accept that everyone has a gender identity then you are automatically labelled transphobic which means you can no longer discuss women's lives and what's happening to lesbians. We are increasingly discovering that lesbians are no longer welcome in the LGBTQ+ world, which is astonishing."

Jackson has said, "Lesbians don't have penises. A lesbian is a biological woman who is attracted to another biological woman. That's obvious. Or at least it was obvious until a few years ago."

=== Conversion therapy ===
LGB Alliance has opposed the inclusion of transgender people in legislation banning conversion therapy. The LGB Alliance claims that affirmation-based therapy for transgender youth is gay conversion therapy and that campaigns to ban conversion therapy for transgender people are "being used as political cover to promote an affirmation-only approach to gender identity".

=== Gender Recognition Reform (Scotland) Bill ===
In 2017, the Scottish Government consulted over 15,000 people on proposed reform to the Gender Recognition Act, with most organizations and approximately 60% of individuals favouring a shift to gender self-identification. In 2019 the government proposed legislation which would allow people to apply in the Scottish civil registry, remove medical barriers and requirements, and require 3 months living in the acquired gender prior to applying and a 4 month "reflection period" after, with false declarations remaining a criminal offence. Groups including LGB Alliance emerged largely in response to the proposed reforms.

The group took out advertisements in Scotland to campaign against the Scottish government's plan to reform the Gender Recognition Act, stating that the reform would create a "gender free-for-all" and was "a law that could be exploited by predatory men who wish to hurt women and girls". Following a number of complaints to the Advertising Standards Authority over the adverts, the ASA issued the group with an "Advice Notice", advising that the messages could be "potentially misleading" because "the legislation it refers to is still under consultation".

=== Treatment of gender dysphoric children ===
Bev Jackson accused the Tavistock and Portman NHS Foundation Trust, which at the time offered Gender Identity Development Services (GIDS) to children (subsequently closed), of "transing out the gay". She also referred to studies which showed that children who identified as transgender were more likely to be autistic, saying she had spoken with a teacher at an SEN (special educational needs) school who told her there were "24 trans kids, one non binary, but no gays and lesbians."

In November 2020, Jackson was quoted in a BBC news item about children experiencing delays in access to gender reassignment treatment, saying, "We don't think children should be allowed to self-diagnose any medical condition." The next month, Jackson welcomed the High Court verdict in the Bell vs. Tavistock trial, which ruled that children should not be given puberty blockers without court approval. However, in September 2021 the High Court's verdict was overturned by the Court of Appeal.

== Reception ==
=== In scholarship ===
Political scientists Christine M. Klapeer and Inga Nüthen describe LGB Alliance as an anti-trans group. Sociologists McLean and Stretesky describe LGB Alliance as part of "a veritable miasma of anti-trans campaign groups [...] united in their antipathy toward transgender people," alongside CitizenGo, FiLiA, Fair Play for Women, Get the L Out, Sex Matters, and Transgender Trend. Laura Miles called it a "virulently anti-trans group." Sociologist Sally Hines writes that "another resident at 55 Tufton Street [...] is the [LGB Alliance]. Formed in 2019 to organize against the trans-inclusive agenda of the leading LGBT Charity ‘Stonewall’, as reflected in its name, the LGBA seeks to bracket off issues pertaining to lesbian, gay and bisexual communities from those of trans people: ‘LGB Without the T’ as the gender–critical slogan goes. Yet, over the five years since its founding, the LGBA has had very little to say about homophobia; giving weight to the arguments from the UK umbrella group of LGBT organizations ‘Consortium’ that the LGB Alliance was formed to ‘promote transphobic activity rather than pro-LGB activities’." Helen Clarke described LGB Alliance as "a prime example of gender-critical feminism" and argued that "in seeking to exclude trans women from gay/queer spaces by presenting them as a threat to (cis) lesbians, LGB Alliance can be understood as deploying strategies of heteroactivism and political whiteness."

The LGB Alliance has been described as "trans-exclusionary" in articles published in the journals Metaphilosophy and the Journal of Gender Studies. LGB Alliance is also described as an anti-trans group by legal scholar Sandra Duffy in Gender and Justice and by Maëlyn Marliere in Revue Française de Civilisation Britannique. In a 2021 article in the International Journal of Sociology, McLean listed LGB Alliance among "UK lobby groups [that] are successfully pushing a radical agenda to deny the basic rights of trans people." Mike Homfray of the University of Liverpool has argued that "there is ample evidence that the LGB Alliance ... has as a central aim [trans people's] isolation and separation from LGB people."

In her article "Astro-TERFs: LGB Alliance’s Role in the UK Media’s Anti-Trans Moral Panic," Gina Gwenffrewi describes the LGB Alliance as a trans-exclusionary astroturf organization connected to right-wing lobbying networks based at 55 Tufton Street. She documents links between the group and far-right and anti-LGBTQ+ think tanks such as the Heritage Foundation and the Witherspoon Institute. Gwenffrewi writes that the group presents itself as a "pro-LGB" organization while working in concert with reactionary movements that aim to roll back trans rights and equality initiatives.

=== Other ===
According to journalist Gaby Hinsliff, "The Alliance is seen by many in the LGBT sector as a fringe organisation at best, and at worst a hate group." It has been described as a hate group by Pride in London, Pride in Surrey, the LGBT+ Liberal Democrats, the Labour Campaign for Trans Rights, the Independent Workers' Union of Great Britain, barrister Jolyon Maugham, Green Party of England and Wales co-leader Carla Denyer, journalist Owen Jones and Natacha Kennedy, co-chair of the Feminist Gender Equality Network. Broadcaster India Willoughby has described the group as "baddies masquerading as the good guys."

In 2022, the Trades Union Congress voted to campaign against the group's charitable status and that of "any transphobic organisation who are awarded charity status by the Charity Commission". PinkNews described the group as "anti-trans". Paul Roberts OBE, CEO of LGBT Consortium said of LGB Alliance "they exist to oppose free, safe and empowered trans lives". Writing in Vice News, journalist Ben Hunte described the group as "anti-trans".

In December 2020, John Nicolson, Member of Parliament for Ochil and South Perthshire, described the group as "sinister" and said that it was absurd for the BBC to rely on "transphobic groups like the so-called LGB Alliance" to give balance on reports about trans issues, saying "you would never do a report on racism, for example, and call in a racist organisation to say that they don't think black people have a right to equality". In October 2021, Labour Shadow Minister for Women and Equalities Taiwo Owatemi argued that LGB Alliance "should be rejected by all those who believe in equality," saying that LGB Alliance "opposes LGBT+ inclusive education," disregards Gillick competence, and has opposed conversion therapy bans.

The group has been condemned by several MPs, including SNP MP Mhairi Black, Liberal Democrat MP Jamie Stone, and Labour MP Charlotte Nichols. A statement from the Labour Campaign for Trans Rights group calling LGB Alliance transphobic and trans-exclusionist was signed by two of the three candidates in the 2020 party leadership elections, Rebecca Long-Bailey and Lisa Nandy, as well as candidates for deputy leader Dawn Butler and Angela Rayner, the latter being elected deputy leader. LGB Alliance has received support from a number of UK politicians, including Boris Johnson (Conservative), Rosie Duffield (Labour), Baroness Sarah Ludford (Liberal Democrats), Joanna Cherry (SNP) and Neale Hanvey (Alba). In July 2020, the group met with Conservative Minister for Women and Equalities Kemi Badenoch.

Dame Melanie Dawes, chief executive of Ofcom, responding to a comment from MP John Nicolson asking why "transphobic groups like the so-called LGB Alliance" should appear on BBC programming, said quoting anti-trans pressure groups in order to bring balance "can be extremely inappropriate".

Gary Powell, who participated in the LGB Alliance's pre-launch meetings and was involved in the promotion of its launch, has been criticised for speaking at events organised by the Heritage Foundation and writing for the Witherspoon Institute, both American conservative think tanks which have campaigned against LGBT rights. Bev Jackson, one of the founders of the LGB Alliance, has been criticised for saying that "working with the Heritage Foundation is sometimes the only possible course of action" since "the leftwing silence on gender in the US is even worse than in the UK".

Malcolm Clark, a co-founder of the LGB Alliance, has been criticised for arguing against LGBT+ clubs in schools, saying that he "[doesn't] see the point of LGBT clubs in schools" and citing a risk of "predatory gay teachers". He stated, "There should never, of course, be bullying. But the vast majority of children have not settled on a sexual orientation. Suggesting they do have a sexual orientation is fraught with dangers – for kids" and "Having clubs where kids explore on school grounds …their sexual orientation seems to be unnecessary and potentially dangerous".

In June 2020, LGB Alliance said in a tweet "To those people saying it is 'homophobic' not to be in favour of gay marriage have a look at the statistics. It seems it's rather a small minority who have made their wedding vows", along with a chart showing that most lesbian, gay and bisexual people are single. The tweet was swiftly deleted after a Twitter backlash that included actor David Paisley, Scottish MP Mhairi Black, and journalist Owen Jones. They wrote in a further tweet: "That same-sex marriage tweet was very badly formulated! The introduction of same-sex marriage was a great breakthrough for gay people. But support for it wasn't universal among LGB activists: many saw it as a sellout – joining the establishment. A minority still view it that way."

James Greig has argued that LGB Alliance has, like the writers Brendan O'Neill (former editor of Spiked magazine who has defended LGB Alliance) and Helen Joyce (director of advocacy for campaign group Sex Matters and author of Trans: When Ideology Meets Reality), attempted to rewrite history. Greig proposes that, unlike the gay and lesbian rights movement, trans activists are depicted as "uniquely demanding, dogmatic and extreme". As evidence, Greig cites a now-deleted tweet where LGB Alliance wrote "In our historical gay and lesbian rights movement, we never demanded that society change its laws, its activities and its language to accommodate us. We never cursed people who disagreed with us or tried to get them fired. We always built bridges."

LGB Alliance received criticism after giving controversial conservative social media personality Andy Ngo a press pass to their October 2021 conference and saying that "whatever his other work in the past, his work on the Wi Spa controversy was extraordinary and important."

The former UK Conservative MP Ben Howlett has described how the LGB Alliance and Sex Matters lobbied Conservative Party members of parliament in private: "I think one of the core reasons why issues surrounding trans people are going high up the agenda is that there's a lot of Machiavellian stuff going on behind the scenes".

On 5 November 2021, MP John Nicolson said that the Speaker of the House of Commons had referred "abuse and obsessive behaviour" from the LGB Alliance to the House of Commons security as part of a review following the murder of David Amess. LGB Alliance had previously run a fundraising campaign for itself where it pledged that "make a donation to us IN HIS [Nicholson's] NAME and we will tweet out your message," subsequently tweeting a number of statements attacking Nicolson, including one that called him a "rape-enabling politician". The fundraiser had been removed from the JustGiving and GoFundMe crowdfunding platforms for violating their rules.

In May 2022 the organisation was criticised for stigmatising queer spaces when it urged the closure of all sex venues for one month, including saunas, leather bars and dark rooms, in response to the 2022–2023 mpox outbreak.

In November 2022, the group was criticised for excluding the trans victims of the Colorado Springs nightclub shooting in their social media condolences, after which it tweeted: "We stand in solidarity – as LGB people – against all violence and extend our thoughts to ALL the victims of such horror".

In December 2022, Twitch removed the LGB Alliance from its approved list of charities because its "anti-transgender advocacy" violated the platform's policies against hateful content; over 16,000 people voted for it to be removed. That same month, it was reported that LGB Alliance had office space at 55 Tufton Street, a building also occupied by several controversial right-wing groups promoting climate change denial and anti-immigration politics. The LGB Alliance denied having links to the groups, stating "the office was chosen because it's handy, flexible, and...it became available at the right time".

== International groups ==
A number of LGB groups have been formed internationally with similar objectives.

=== Ireland ===
In October 2020, a group called LGB Alliance Ireland was launched on Twitter. A number of Irish LGBT+ activists said that group was based in the UK and was mainly composed of British supporters. This was disputed by the group, which stated that "all our committee members are living in Ireland, with representation in each of the four provinces". In November 2020, LGB Alliance Ireland faced criticism after calling for schools to ignore LGBT youth organisation BeLonG To's Stand Up Awareness Week. In August 2022, the Global Project against Hate and Extremism released a report in which it classified LGB Alliance Ireland as a far-right anti-transgender hate group.

=== Iceland ===
In September 2020, a linked group was launched in Iceland, named LBG teymið, with Iva Marín Adrichem as a co-founder. Þorbjörg Þorvaldsdóttir, director of Icelandic national queer organisation Samtökin '78, condemned the group. The Icelandic group later rebranded as Samtökin 22.

=== Australia ===
In August 2022, LGB Alliance Australia filed an application with Equal Opportunity Tasmania, part of the Tasmanian Department of Justice, for permission to hold drag shows from which trans women would be banned from attending. Tasmania's anti-discrimination commissioner rejected the request. In October 2022, the Global Project against Hate and Extremism released a report in which it classified LGB Alliance Australia as a far-right anti-transgender hate group. LGB Alliance Australia responded that it believed GPAHE had misrepresented it. In 2023, the group published its support for Sall Grover's stance defending a legal challenge concerning a women's only mobile app.

=== Canada ===
In November 2020, LGB Alliance Canada submitted a brief in opposition to a proposed ban on conversion therapy.

=== LGB International ===
An organisation named LGB International was formed, which calls itself a "federation of LGB organisations". It recalls the formation of LGB alliance in its history. All the above organisations are mentioned in its list of national members.

== See also ==
- Diversity Champions
- For Women Scotland
- Sex Matters (advocacy group)
- Woman's Place UK
- Nolan Investigates
- Trans-exclusionary radical feminism
