= Reindorf =

Reindorf is a Danish and Ghanaian surname and given name. Notable people with the name include:

- Akua Reindorf (fl. 2026), British lawyer
- Carl Christian Reindorf (1834–1917), Ghanaian pioneer historian, teacher, farmer, trader, physician and pastor
  - Carl Reindorf Park Stadium, football stadium in Accra, Ghana
- Joe Reindorf (1924–1996), Ghanaian historian, lawyer and politician
- Carl Daniel Reindorf (born 1927), Ghanaian politician
- Jessy Reindorf (born 1991), Rwandan football forward
- Michael Reindorf (born 2005), English football forward
- Reindorf Huncho (born 2006), Ghanaian football defensive midfielder

== See also ==
- Reindorf Review, 2021 article by the University of Essex
