= Louise Westmarland =

British criminologist

Academic background
- Education: Durham University
- Thesis: An ethnography of gendered policing

Academic work
- Discipline: criminology
- Institutions: Open University

Louise Westmarland is a British criminologist and Professor of Criminology at Open University, where she is also head of discipline in social policy and criminology. She has researched police conduct since the early 2000s. Her research focuses on police and policing, including gender and policing, homicide investigations, and corruption, integrity and ethics. She is director of the International Centre for Comparative Criminological Research. She earned her PhD at Durham University in 1998 with the thesis An ethnography of gendered policing. According to Google Scholar her work has been cited over 3,000 times in academic literature.

In January 2024 Westmarland's comparison of Jo Phoenix to a "racist uncle" was mentioned in the judgment of an employment tribunal case Phoenix brought against her former employer.

== Selected bibliography ==
- Researching crime and justice: tales from the field, Routledge, 2011
- Creating citizen-consumers: Changing Publics and changing public services, Sage, 2007
- Gender and policing: sex, power and police culture, Willan Publishing, 2001
