= Jane Campbell, Baroness Campbell of Surbiton =

British disability reform advocate (born 1959)

The Right Honourable The Baroness Campbell of Surbiton DBE
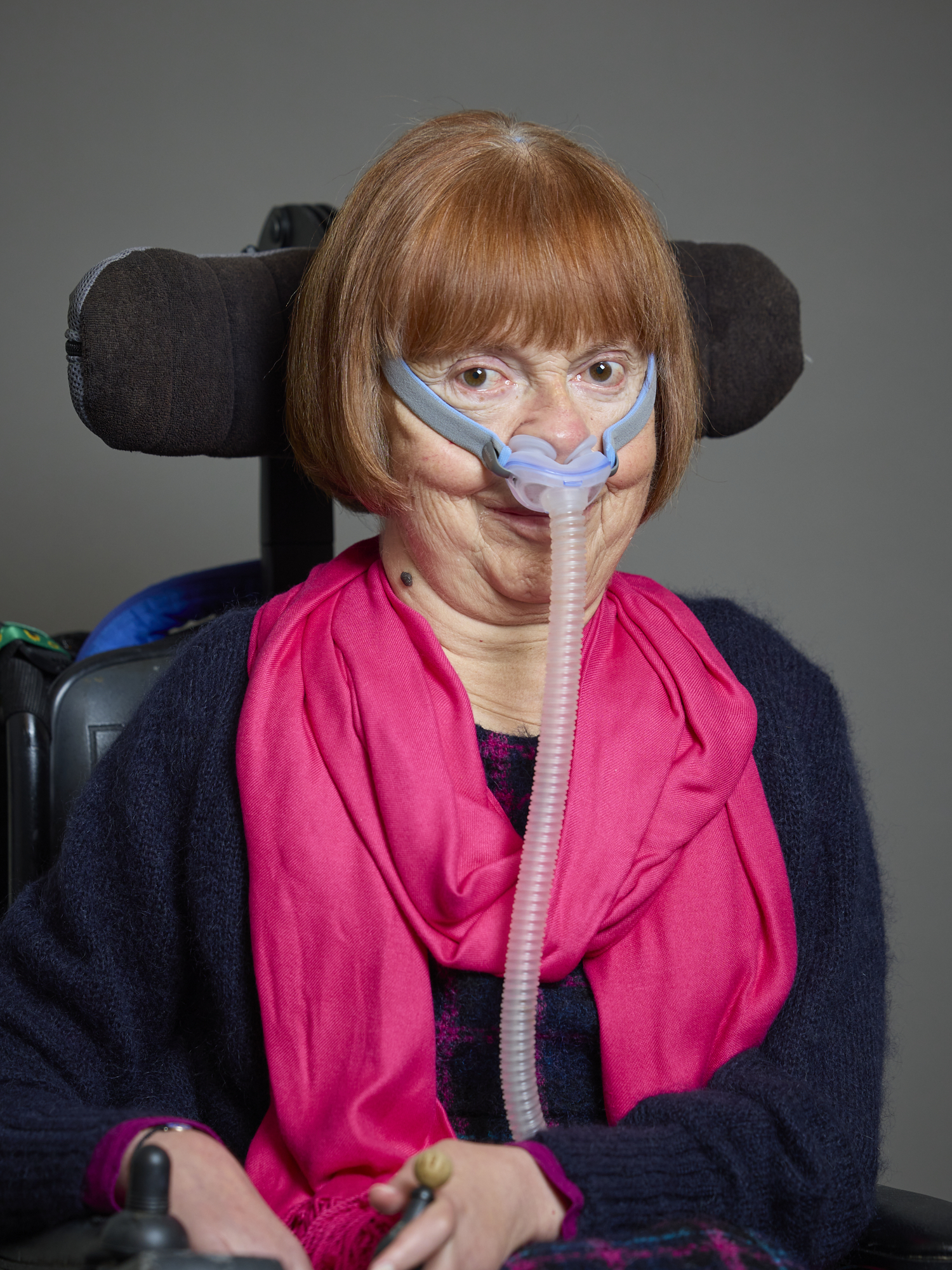
- Official portrait, 2025

Member of the House of Lords
- Lord Temporal
- Life peerage 30 March 2007

Personal details
- Born: Jane Susan Campbell; 19 April 1959 (age 67) London, England
- Party: Crossbench
- Known for: Campaigner and adviser for disability reforms
- Website: baronesscampbellofsurbiton.uk
- Campbell's voice from the BBC programme Desert Island Discs, 5 August 2012

Jane Susan Campbell, Baroness Campbell of Surbiton, DBE (born 19 April 1959), is a British disability rights campaigner and a life peer in the House of Lords. She was Commissioner of the Equality and Human Rights Commission (EHRC), and served as the Chair of the Disability Committee which led on to the EHRC Disability Programme. She was the former Chair of the Social Care Institute for Excellence (SCIE). She was a Commissioner at the Disability Rights Commission (DRC).

== Early life ==
Campbell grew up in New Malden. Her father, Ron, was a heating engineer and her mother, Jesse, was a window dresser in a gown shop. At the age of nine months Campbell did not have the strength in her neck muscles to hold her head up, and exhibited little movement by the age of one year. Her mother consulted the family doctor who referred her to the local Kingston Hospital.

She was subsequently referred to Great Ormond Street Hospital where she was diagnosed with spinal muscular atrophy and given a prognosis that she would not live to reach the age of two years; however, it was her younger sister, Sally, who died from the same disease before that age. As a child she was prone to getting severe chest infections, which occurred two or three times per year, sometimes requiring hospitalisation.

== Education ==
Campbell went to a segregated school for disabled children where academic achievement was not the top priority. Her best friend, who had a hole in the heart, died at the age of 13 years. She left school at the age of 16 years with no qualifications and hardly able to read or write, but she nevertheless regarded herself as quite intelligent.

In 1975 she enrolled at Hereward College, Tile Hill, Coventry; a special college for disabled students where there was an academic environment, and where she was generally able to enjoy the life-style of an ordinary teenager. While there she gained six O-levels and three A-levels within three years. From Coventry she went to Hatfield Polytechnic, and then became an MA at the University of Sussex with a dissertation on Sylvia Pankhurst.

== Career ==
Following a year in 1983 as an administrator at the Royal Association for Disability and Rehabilitation (RADAR), in 1984 she started her career in local government as Equal Opportunities Liaison Officer, in Greater London Council (GLC) followed by Disability Training Development Officer role, London Boroughs Disability Resource Team (DRT) where she ran the Disability Equality and Awareness training unit.

In 1987 she was appointed as a Principal Disability Advisor for London Borough of Hounslow. After a year she returned to the DRT as Director of Training where she remained until she established her own disability consultancy in 1994. In the early 1990s she co-chaired the British Council of Disabled People (BCODP) with Lucille Lusk.

In 1996 there was a spin-out organisation from BCODP - the National Centre for Independent Living (NCIL) - which she co-founded and co-directed with Frances Hassler. Campbell worked at NCIL for six years before being appointed by the Minister for Social Care to chair the Social Care Institute for Excellence (SCIE). Also in 1996 she co-authored a textbook entitled Disability Politics, and in 2000 she was awarded the Member of the British Empire (MBE), then in 2006 she was appointed a Dame Commander of the Order of the British Empire (DBE) in the Queen's Birthday Honours.

In 2003, Campbell was awarded an honorary doctorate in law from Bristol University and another in social sciences from Sheffield Hallam University. She was Commissioner of the Disability Rights Commission until it was wound up in October 2006.

From 2006 to 2008, she was commissioner of the Equality and Human Rights Commission (EHRC). She also served as chair of the Disability Committee which led on to the EHRC Disability Programme.

On 3 April 2007, after it was announced by the House of Lords Appointments Commission she became a life peer and would sit as a crossbencher. Her peerage was gazetted as Baroness Campbell of Surbiton, of Surbiton in the Royal Borough of Kingston upon Thames on 30 March 2007.

In her campaigning record, items of public note include the creation and later closure of the Independent Living Fund (ILF), the creation of the Community Care (Direct Payments) Act 1996, the loss of some disabled people's welfare benefits, the disproportionate impact of the COVID-19 pandemic on disabled people's lives, and attempts in Parliament and the appeal courts to change the law on assisted dying as it impacts on disabled people.

== Personal life ==
Campbell met her first husband, Graham Ingleson, at Hereward College; they married in 1987 when she was 27 years old. He was a haemophiliac, and six weeks before the wedding they discovered that he had contracted HIV from a blood transfusion following a car accident in 1985, from which he later died in December 1993. In 2009 she lived in Tolworth with her second husband Roger Symes, a businessman.

Because of her physical weakness Campbell requires help to do almost everything and needs a ventilator to help her breathe at night. She uses an electrically powered wheelchair and has a computer on which she types with one finger. As of 2009, she received a direct payment from the local authority for her care needs, which enabled her to employ five female carers to help her with the routine activities of daily living.
