= Mary-Ann Stephenson =

Chair of British Equality and Human Rights Commission

- Education: University of Warwick

Mary-Ann Stephenson is the current chair of the British Equality and Human Rights Commission, having taken over from Kishwer Falkner on 1 December 2025.

== Career ==
She holds a PhD in equality law from the University of Warwick and has worked as the Director of the Women's Budget Group and of the Fawcett Society.

=== Equality and Human Rights Commission ===
In June 2025, Stephenson was announced as the preferred candidate for the commission. Stephenson's appointment had been opposed by the UK parliament's Women and Equalities committee, who had concerns about her suitability for the position. Among their concerns were statements Stephenson had made that critics characterised as gender critical or anti-trans. She was confirmed to the position in July 2025.
