= Hereward College =

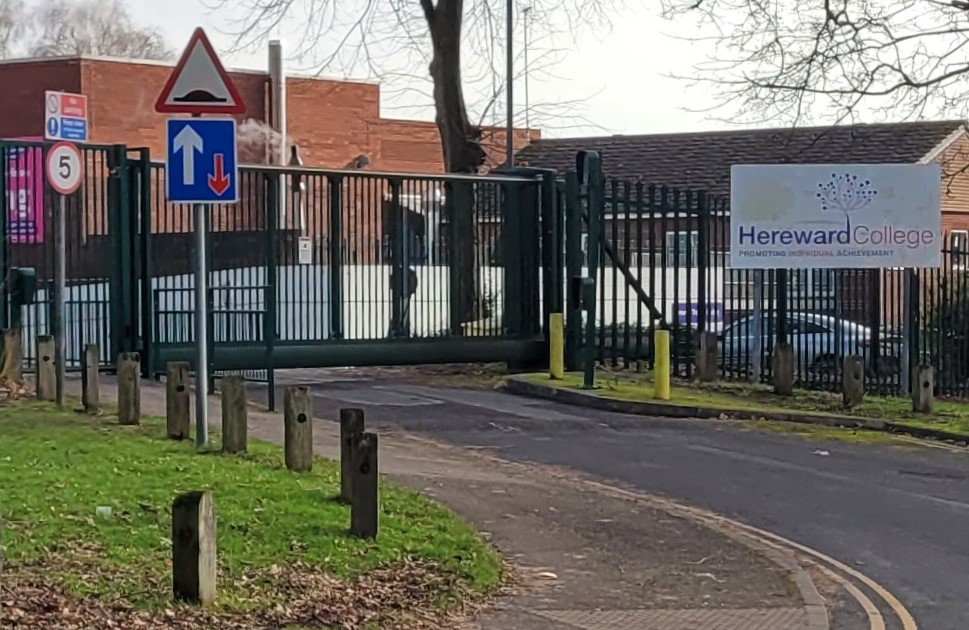
- Hereward College in 2025

Location
- Bramston Crescent, Tile Hill; Coventry, West Midlands, CV4 9SW; England; 52°24′05″N 1°34′38″W

Information
- Type: Further education college
- Motto: "Promoting Individual Achievement"
- Established: September 1971
- Local authority: Coventry
- Department for Education URN: 130474 Tables
- Ofsted: Reports
- Principal & Chief Executive: Paul Cook MBE (Principal); Rosie Herbert (Vice Principal)
- Gender: Coeducational
- Age: 16 to 25
- Enrolment: c. 450
- Campus size: 12 acres (4.9 ha)
- Colours: Purple; Pink
- Website: hereward.ac.uk

Hereward College of Further Education, better known simply as Hereward College, is a general further education college, specialising for young people with disabilities and additional needs in Tile Hill, Coventry, England. It is governed by the Hereward Corporation.

In 1961, a working group was launched by the Department for Education and Science to discuss the proposals of creating a publicly funded college solely for young people with disabilities – which would mark the first of its kind in the United Kingdom. Three years later, in 1964, Coventry's Department of Education was granted permission to start work on the project. Coventry was chosen as the location due to being central in the Midlands. The costs were shared between educational authorities in England and Wales. Construction commenced on the land in 1968, and Hereward College opened in September 1971 as "an experiment" to see if it was beneficial to its learners. On 2 March 1972, HRH Princess Alexandra visited the college to declare it officially open.

Hereward is based on a 4.90-hectare (12-acre) site on Bramston Crescent serving day and residential learners with autism, physical difficulties, learning difficulties, and complex disabilities, across three learning pathways – Foundation, Explorer, and Discovery. It is recognised as an exempt charity under Section 3 of the Charities Act 2011. In December 2014, a charity named Friends of Hereward College was incorporated with the Charity Commission by Simon Shackleton to provide extra resources and services that would not otherwise be provided from statutory funds.

== Facilities ==
There are three main areas for learners to access – Cafe Mojo, a refectory and cafe, the Learning Resource Centre (LRC), and the Indigo Enterprise Store, which opened in 2006. In 2010, when Indigo relocated, it was re-opened by Coronation Street actor Jimmi Harkishin, who plays shop owner Dev Alahan. Indigo provides work experience opportunities for students. In January 2011, its volunteers were nominated for a Prince's Trust award, after having previously won a West Midlands Community Impact Award.

In June 2008, the Performing Arts Centre was opened by former student Nabil Shaban, who went on to found the Graeae Theatre Company for disabled actors, as well as Olympic middle-distance and long-distance runner David Moorcroft.

On 29 March 2013, England's former national rugby captain Martin Johnson CBE opened the Wooden Spoon Suite inside The Lodge — a former accommodation block now repurposed as The Hive business centre — after receiving a £12,000 donation from the Wooden Spoon Society.

In June 2019, multinational hotel and restaurant company Whitbread partnered with Hereward to open a mini Premier Inn training facility, to help train students for work in the hospitality sector. It was constructed by Novus Property Solutions, and it is the smallest non-commercial Premier Inn in the country.

In 2021, Hereward College opened an outreach centre in Digbeth's Custard Factory to serve Birmingham-based employers and students.

Local basketball team Tile Hill Trojans have used the basketball court inside the sports hall as their home ground for more than 25 years. The centre is also used by members of the Coventry Table Tennis Club for their pay as you play sessions.

== Principals ==
Name	Term of Office	Time (approx.)
Arthur McAllister	September 1971–Unknown	Unknown
Rees Williams	1993–July 1995	2 years
Catherine Mary Cole OBE	1995–2003	8 years
Keith Robinson	c. 2003–July 2006	3 years
Janis Firminger	2006–December 2010	4 years
Sheila Fleming	April 2011–October 2016	6 years
Paul Cook MBE	August 2017–present	8 years

== Alumni ==
- Elisabeth Standen, equalities adviser
- Jane Campbell, Baroness Campbell of Surbiton
- Nabil Shaban, co-founder of Graeae and Doctor Who actor
- Nasa Begum, disability rights campaigner
- Richard Tomlinson, lecturer and director of Graeae
- Sir Bert Massie CBE, disability rights campaigner
