= Trans Kids Deserve Better =

British trans youth rights organization

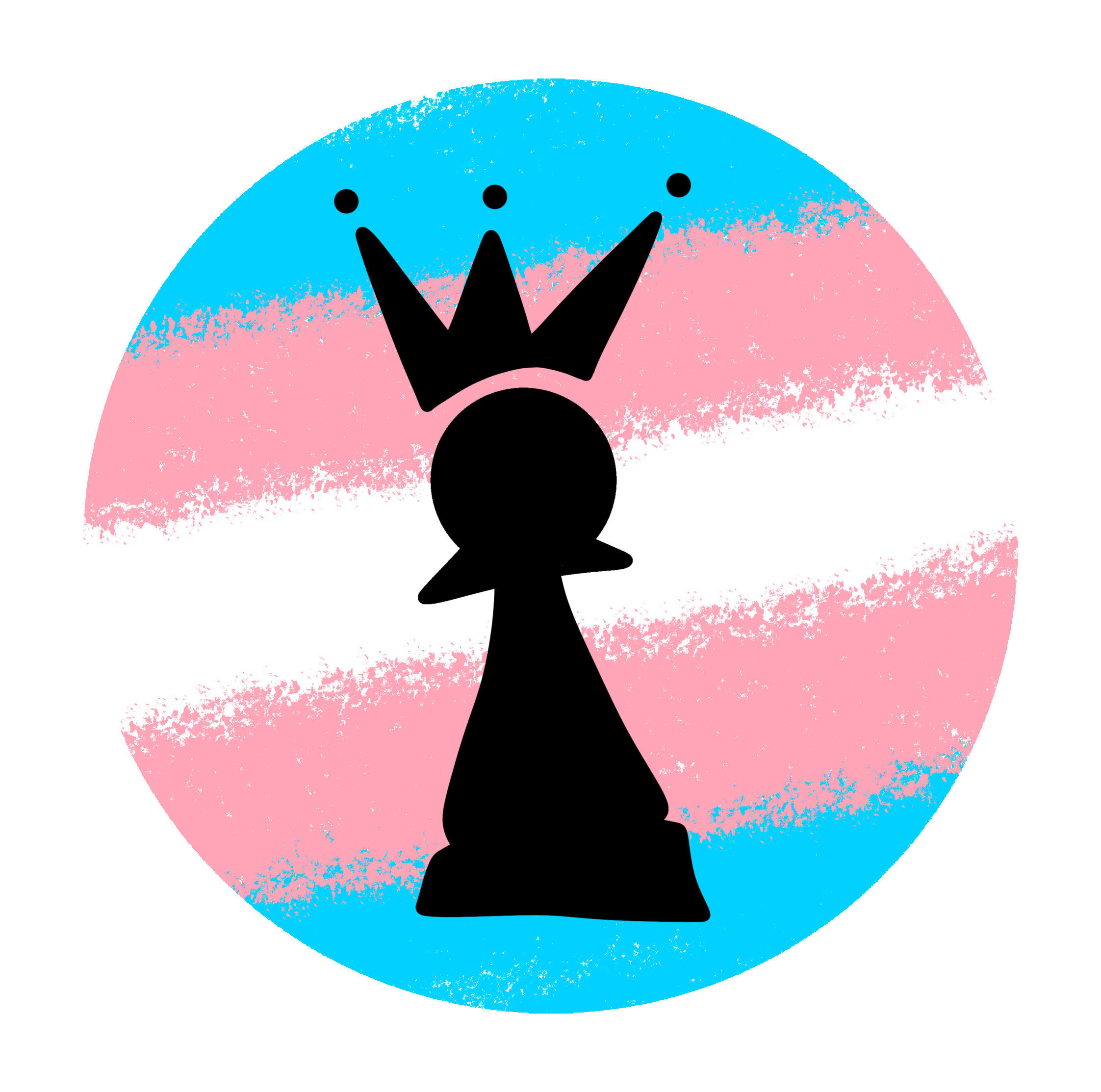
- Abbreviation: TKDB
- Formation: 2024
- Purpose: Transgender rights and access to gender-affirming healthcare
- Region served: United Kingdom
- Website: transkidsdeservebetter.org

Trans Kids Deserve Better is a British action network consisting primarily of trans youth. The group advocates for transgender rights in the UK including access to gender-affirming care for minors and protections from discrimination, deadnaming, and misgendering in schools. The group has protested by occupying the NHS headquarters and the Department for Education headquarters. It also released crickets during an LGB Alliance meeting.

== Structure ==
The group has regional branches in Scotland, London, and the Midlands. The criteria for joining are being a trans youth under 18 years old. The group organizes protests which draw on famous LGBT protests of the past such as the die-ins organized by ACT UP.

== History ==
The group's first protest occurred in July 2024 during the Pride in London parade, when two activists with the group climbed the NHS England headquarters in response to their decision to cease prescription of puberty blockers for trans youth in May. They held a sign above the building saying "we are not pawns for your politics" and were eventually joined by other transgender youth, with one holding a sign saying "The Cass Report is built on transphobia". The group made three demands: equal access to gender-affirming healthcare, protections against misgendering and deadnaming, and to no longer be used as "political pawns".

This sit-in lasted for four days. The group was supported on Twitter with the hashtag "#TransKidsDeserveBetter" and raised nearly £7,000 from digital donations. In an interview on the second day of the protest, one of the protesters said that "Decisions are being taken that affect our lives without any trans people in the room, let alone trans young people."

In August 2024, the group led a week-long occupation of a Department for Education (DfE) building in London, saying that a draft guidance produced by the conservative government in December 2023 which had been delivered to British teaching institutions created "confusion" and an "unsafe environment". In May, the DfE had introduced guidance that would ban lessons on the concept of gender identity, specified all lessons on trans people should focus on the legality of transitioning and that legal gender changes are reserved for those over 18, and mandated that while in school "boys cannot be legally classified as girls or vice versa". In a statement to Them magazine, one of the activists explained the group decided to target the Department for Education "because in the UK, at the moment, trans kids are treated horribly in education." Following national coverage of the protest, in a statement to ITV News, the department said that they would meet with the group "as soon as possible".

In October 2024, the group drew notice when protesters released sacks of crickets during the conference of the anti-trans group LGB Alliance as one of the final talks was about to start. The group released a satirical video during the incident where a trans youth dressed as a cricket reported on the protest and stated that the LGB Alliance has opposed bans on conversion therapy and platforms "proud speeches about shutting down trans healthcare". The group released a statement following the protest: "6 of us released about 6,000 crickets into hate group LGB Alliance's annual conference. The result of the conference, if it had gone ahead as planned, would have been an acceleration of transphobic hate and misinformation, which drives much of the attack on our healthcare and our dignity."

In December 2024 16 trans activists from Trans Kids Deserve Better staged a die-in at London Victoria station in order to call for the reversal of the ban on puberty blockers, lying on the floor with homemade cardboard headstones and coffins next to them, before moving to the Department of Health and Social Care and leaving the headstones and coffins outside. The headstones and coffins detailed the interests of the activist holding them, for example "Here lies Merlin who loved Lord of the Rings" and "Here lies Buck who loved reading".

Since August 2024, the group has left cardboard coffins outside UK Health Secretary Wes Streeting's office to protest his renewal of the government's ban on puberty blockers following the Cass Review as part of their campaign called "Kids Are Dying Wes". This campaign has since finished, and is now in its second phase. He has not responded to their requests to meet. In November TKDB staged a die in at Victoria Station in London to protest the ban. In December, they organized an encampment outside Streeting's office to protest his decision to indefinitely extend it. An 18 year old activist with TKDB said Streeting "has chosen politics over our lives" and "We are being put through an experiment, but the experiment is to deny us healthcare, not to provide it. He wants to see what happens to us when we grow up permanently altered in ways we never wanted, and we never consented to be part of that." A spokesperson for the group has stated "it is diabolical that groups like Bayswater and Genspect were given more regard in the consultation to permanently ban puberty blockers [than] transgender children, the people the ban directly affects."

Members of the group have stated it is surprising they have received relatively little media coverage. One member stated "the fact that none of the news companies or newspapers have decided to report on this is surprising. I think it’s strategic. I feel like they’re trying to ignore us for as long as they can."

== Reception ==
Stonewall co-founder Lisa Power and Gay Liberation Front (GLF) veteran Roz Kaveney lauded their protest of the NHS and against injustice towards trans youth as reminiscent of the original Pride protests.

Author JK Rowling, who spoke at the interrupted LGB Alliance conference, called the group's actions "homophobic".
