= Bert Massie =

British disability rights campaigner

Sir Bert Massie CBE DL FRSA

Chairman of the Disability Rights Commission
- In office 2000–2007

Personal details
- Born: Herbert William Massie; 31 March 1949 Liverpool, England
- Died: 15 October 2017 (aged 68)
- Education: Sandfield Park Special School; Hereward College
- Alma mater: Liverpool Polytechnic; Manchester Polytechnic

Sir Herbert William Massie, CBE, DL, FRSA (31 March 1949 – 15 October 2017), known as Bert Massie, was a British disability rights campaigner. He served as Chairman of the Disability Rights Commission from 2000 to 2007, and was a founding Commissioner of its successor the Equality and Human Rights Commission.

== Early life ==
Massie was born in Liverpool, on 31 March 1949 to Herbert Douglas Massie and Lucy Joan Massie.

He contracted polio in 1949 and spent his first five years receiving care at Liverpool's Alder Hey Children's Hospital. He moved to the Children's School of Rest and Recovery at the age of five and to Sandfield Park Special School at the age of eleven. As disabled students were not expected to study for O-levels, he left school with no qualifications.

After leaving school, he began working for the Liverpool Association for the Disabled. While there he decided to study O-levels and as no evening classes were accessible to a wheelchair user, he received tuition from nuns at a local convent. He then left his job to study for A-levels at Hereward College, a special needs college in Coventry, West Midlands.

He graduated from Liverpool Polytechnic in 1977 with a Bachelor of Arts (BA). He then attended Manchester Polytechnic completing a Certificate of Qualification in Social Work (CQSW).

== Career ==
In 1978, Massie joined the Royal Association for Disability and Rehabilitation. He was its Director from 1990 to 1999. He served as Chairman of the Disability Rights Commission from 2000 to 2007. He was a founding Commissioner of its successor the Equality and Human Rights Commission. He was a governor of Motability, a British car scheme for disabled people.

== Personal life ==
In 2007, Massie married Maureen Lilian Shaw.

Massie died on 15 October 2017, aged 68. He had had cancer.

== Honours ==
Massie was appointed Officer of the Order of the British Empire (OBE) in the 1984 Queen's Birthday Honours. He was promoted to Commander of the Order of the British Empire (CBE) in the 2000 New Year Honours "for services to The National Disability Council and the Royal Association for Disability and Rehabilitation". It was announced in the 2007 New Year Honours that he was to be made a Knight Bachelor "for services to Disabled People". On 4 May 2007, he was knighted at Buckingham Palace by Charles, Prince of Wales. In April 2014, he was commissioned a Deputy Lieutenant to the Lord Lieutenant of Merseyside.

He was made an honorary Doctor of Laws (LL.D) by the University of Bristol on 14 July 2005. In 2008, he was made a Freeman of the City of London and became a member of the Worshipful Company of Wheelwrights.
