= For Women Scotland Ltd v The Scottish Ministers =

2025 UK Supreme Court case

- Court: Supreme Court of the United Kingdom
- Argued: 26–27 November 2024
- Decided: 16 April 2025
- Neutral citation: [2025] UKSC 16

Case history
- Prior history: [2023] CSIH 37 [2022] CSIH 4
- Appealed from: Inner House of the Court of Session

Court membership
- Judges sitting: Reed, Hodge, Lloyd-Jones, Rose, Simler

Case opinions
- Decision by: Hodge, Rose and Simler (with whom Reed and Lloyd-Jones agree: unanimous)

For Women Scotland Ltd v The Scottish Ministers [2025] UKSC 16 is a leading UK Supreme Court decision on the statutory interpretation of the terms man and woman in the Equality Act 2010 and the application of the Gender Recognition Act 2004.

The case was brought by For Women Scotland (FWS), an anti-transgender, gender-critical feminist, Scottish campaign group. From 2018 to 2023, FWS brought judicial review challenges against the Scottish government's definition of man and woman. In 2023, the Inner House of the Court of Session found that the definitions under the Equality Act 2010 included transgender persons who had obtained a gender recognition certificate under the Gender Recognition Act 2004. On a further appeal to the Supreme Court, FWS argued that the Equality Act's definitions referred to "biological sex" and that the Scottish government's issued guidance was invalid.

The Court heard submissions in 2024, with four intervenors, including the Equality and Human Rights Commission (EHRC) and Amnesty International. An application by two transgender legal experts for intervention was denied, such that no trans parties were permitted to intervene. In a unanimous decision, the court found that the terms man, woman, and sex under the Equality Act 2010 were always intended to refer to biological sex, and not gender or gender identity.

In reaching its decision, the court also held that the Gender Recognition Act 2004 was not generally applicable to all statutes, such that trans people were always legally recognised as having the gender they identify with. The judges did not rule more broadly on when trans women would be considered women in contexts outside the Equality Act. The court believed that the decision would not deprive trans people of their legal rights, in part because of the discrimination protections offered to transgender people under the Equality Act 2010.

The ruling has been highly controversial, garnering praise and criticism. The ruling was welcomed by gender-critical groups, Cabinet ministers, and Members of Parliament across both the Conservative and Labour parties. However, the decision and subsequent EHRC guidance has been widely criticised by academics and pro-LGBTQ activists for being medically and legally flawed, with potentially severe implications for transgender rights in the UK. Condemnation of the ruling came from groups such as Stonewall and Human Rights Watch.

As a result of the decision, the EHRC issued new guidance on transgender issues, restricting the ability of trans people to access single-sex spaces such as toilets.

== Background ==
In 2002, the European Court of Human Rights in Goodwin v United Kingdom found that the UK was breaching the European Convention on Human Rights by failing to legally recognise the acquired gender of trans people. This led to the passage of the Gender Recognition Act 2004 (GRA 2004), which allowed trans people to legally change their gender through a Gender Recognition Certificate (GRC) with support of two doctors and evidence of living in their acquired gender for 2 years.

From 2018 to 2023, the gender-critical advocacy group For Women Scotland (FWS) raised a series of judicial review challenges against trans-inclusive policies of the Scottish government before the Court of Session in Scotland. The final decision in 2023 saw the Inner House rule that the definition of woman under the Equality Act 2010 included trans women who had a GRC. FWS appealed the decision to the Supreme Court, engaging King's Counsel Aidan O'Neill after a crowdfunding campaign; of the approximately £300,000 raised, £70,000 was donated by author J. K. Rowling.

=== Judicial review of devolved legislation ===
In 2018, Scotland passed the Gender Representation on Public Boards Act (Scotland) 2018, a law that requires public authorities with boards to encourage participation by women. The legislation as assented contained a definition of "woman" that:

includes a person who has the protected characteristic of gender reassignment (within the meaning of section 7 of the Equality Act 2010) if, and only if, the person is living as a woman and is proposing to undergo, is undergoing or has undergone a process (or part of a process) for the purpose of becoming female.

In 2021, the Outer House of the Court of Session of Scotland heard a judicial review application brought by the gender-critical advocacy group For Women Scotland (FWS). The decision was in favour of the Scottish Ministers. In February 2022, following an appeal by FWS, the ruling was overturned by the Inner House of the Court of Session.

As a result of this ruling, the statutory guidance to the Gender Representation on Public Boards (Scotland) Act 2018 was published on 19 April 2022 that stated that "woman" was simply to be defined as per the Equality Act 2010. However, the guidance also stated that per the Gender Recognition Act 2004, people in possession of a full GRC were to be recognised by their "acquired gender".

=== Subsequent judicial review of statutory guidance ===
In July 2022, FWS petitioned for judicial review of the statutory guidance. In December 2022, Lady Haldane ruled in favour of the Scottish Ministers, stating that the updated statutory guidance was lawful; the definition of "sex" per the Equality Act 2010 was "not limited to biological or birth sex"; and the definition "includes those in possession of a GRC obtained in accordance with the 2004 Act stating their acquired gender, and thus their sex".

In October 2023, FWS appealed the decision, arguing that the ruling conflated sex and gender in a manner that was "unworkable and impractical". On 1 November 2023, the Inner House dismissed the appeal. Lady Dorrian held that the legal definition of a person's sex was that of their "acquired gender" if they received a GRC.

=== Hearing ===
Oral arguments were heard at the Supreme Court from 26 to 27 November 2024. The Supreme Court allowed two intervenors to make written and oral submissions (Sex Matters and the Equality and Human Rights Commission (EHRC)) and another two intervenors to make written submissions only (Amnesty International and a group of three campaigning organisations comprising the LGB Alliance, The Lesbian Project, and Scottish Lesbians). An application for intervention by two transgender legal experts — Victoria McCloud and Stephen Whittle — made with the support of the Good Law Project was rejected, which resulted in no trans parties being permitted to intervene.

For Women Scotland argued that "sex" in the Equality Act always referenced "biological sex". Sex Matters' intervention largely agreed, noting that the Equality Act's "gender reassignment" definition did not relate to biological sex but was sui generis. The campaigning group submitted on the potential effects of a trans-inclusive definition on the rights of lesbians under the Equality Act, also making arguments under the European Convention of Human Rights.

The Scottish Government argued that "woman" in the Equality Act includes a person with a Gender Recognition Certificate in the "acquired gender" of female as defined under the GRA 2004. The EHRC agreed with this position and argued that, although this interpretation would result in practical issues under the EA 2010, these issues were for Parliament to resolve. Amnesty International made submissions on human rights principles.

== Judgment ==
On 16 April 2025, the Lord Hodge, on behalf of the Supreme Court, delivered the judgment, finding that the terms "man", "woman", and "sex" in the Equality Act 2010 (EA 2010) were "always intended" to refer to "biological sex", and not "certificated sex" under the Gender Recognition Act 2004 (GRA 2004), and concluded that any other interpretation would cause the Act to be incoherent and impracticable to operate.

More specifically, the court considered the interaction between section 9(1) of the GRA 2004, a deeming provision which allowed trans people with GRCs to be recognised in law as having the sex of their "acquired gender", and sections 11 and 212(1) of the EA 2010. Section 9(3) of the GRA 2004 provided for an carve-out to the rule in section 9(1), (Note: At [156].) and it was held to be operative upon the interpretation of "man" and "woman" under the EA 2010. (Note: At [265].) For section 9(1) to apply to any given piece of legislation, it was held that a court had to "carefully consider" the "wording, context and policy" of an act. (Note: At [108].) Where the court finds that the definition of sex or gender under section 9(1) resulted in "a clear incompatibility" or an act being "rendered incoherent or unworkable", it must disapply the section, which the Supreme Court did for the EA 2010. (Note: At [155].)

The court summarised eighteen reasons to support the finding that the EA 2010 would be "rendered incoherent or unworkable" if the s 9(1) definition was used, including: the predecessor to the EA 2010, the Sex Discrimination Act 1975, "referred to biological sex" as a matter of parliamentary intention; the GRA 2004 did not have retrospective effect on the 1975 Act; trans people already enjoy the protected characteristic of gender reassignment under the EA 2010, which provides different rights than those arising from sex; and definitions under the EA 2010 ought to be interpreted consistently throughout the act, and a variable definition would be inappropriate given the provisions on pregnancy and women's rights. (Note: At [265].) Nonetheless, the court did not clarify the definition of "biological sex" or "man" or "woman" in law, stating that they were "self-explanatory" and "require no further explanation". (Note: At [171].)

Despite finding for For Women Scotland, the Supreme Court also stated that the decision would not disadvantage trans persons in law, noting also that trans persons retain rights against discrimination, harassment, and unequal pay on the basis of gender reassignment. (Note: At [248]-[263]) Lord Hodge, in an interview with The Times, later clarified that the judgement had nothing to do with how or where single sex spaces should be created before adding trans people "had been led to believe... for the last 15 years that they had rights, which they didn't have".

The court found that under the "biological sex" definition, trans women could be excluded from female-only spaces, including changing rooms and homeless shelters; further, trans men could now also be excluded from female spaces in the same manner as trans women if they had a "masculine appearance". (Note: At [166]-[247])

As such, it allowed the appeal, invalidating the Scottish Government's guidance.

== Reception ==
=== Immediate aftermath ===
After the decision was issued by the Supreme Court, gender-critical activists celebrated with champagne outside the court building. Susan Smith, co-director of For Women Scotland, celebrated the decision as affirming "common sense" and that "women are protected by their biological sex". The Scottish government, speaking with BBC News, responded to its loss by saying that it had "acted in good faith" in interpreting the acts, following the guidance that had previously been issued by the EHRC.

Sex Matters stated that the decision meant that gender self-identification was "dead" and argued for the exclusion of trans persons who present as their identified gender from both male and female bathrooms. The LGB Alliance regarded the decision as protecting gay and lesbian rights by allowing gay and lesbian associations to exclude trans persons.

Amnesty International UK stated that the decision implied "potentially concerning consequences for trans people", although it was at the time too early to determine what those effects were. The NGO also emphasised the Supreme Court's affirmation that trans people should not be harassed or discriminated against per the Equality Act.

=== Advocacy and community groups ===
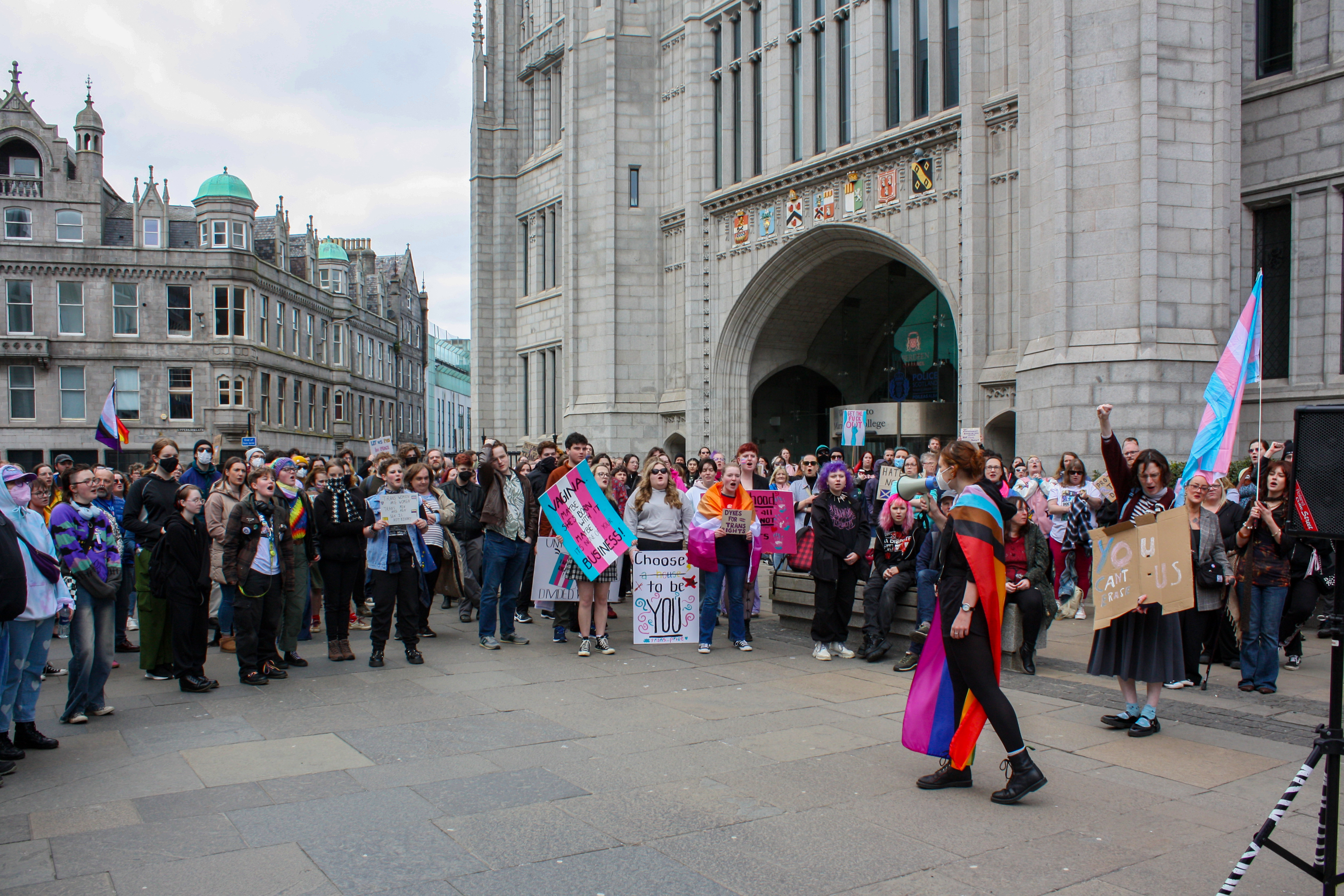
Protest against the ruling at Marischal College in Aberdeen on 20 April 2025

The decision was widely condemned by numerous LGBTQ organisations and activists, including Stonewall, TransActual, Victoria McCloud, and the LGBT Consortium. The decision was also criticised by Human Rights Watch and performing arts union Equity.

Over the Easter long weekend of 18–20 April, protests against the ruling were held in towns and cities throughout the UK. Thousands gathered for a rally at London's Parliament Square on 19 April, organised by a group of 24 pro-LGBTQ groups. Seven statues were vandalised during the London protests, including the statue of former Union of South Africa prime minister Jan Smuts (which was spray painted with the message "Trans rights are human rights"), and the statue of women's suffrage activist Millicent Fawcett (which had ""Fag rights" written onto the banner it was holding).

Birmingham Pride, Brighton Pride, London Pride, Manchester Pride, and Pride Glasgow subsequently announced that they would prohibit political parties from sending official representatives to their events, in "unequivocal solidarity" with the trans community.

=== Politicians and officials ===
Labour Prime Minister Keir Starmer "welcomed" the judgement for bringing "clarity", interpreting the decision as making "absolutely clear" that "a woman is an adult female". Labour party leaders, including Minister for Women and Equalities Bridget Phillipson, interpreted the decision as providing support for the rule that trans people should not be allowed to use single-sex spaces for their identified gender, including toilets, hospitals, shelters, and rape crisis centers as examples. At the same time, LGBT+ Labour stated they were "deeply disappointed" by the judgement and its potential harmful effects on trans persons and transphobia.

Conservative Party leader Kemi Badenoch considered it a "victory" for women who had been targeted for "stating the obvious" and that "the era of Keir Starmer telling us women can have penises has come to an end."

In Scotland, Maggie Chapman, Scottish Greens Member of the Scottish Parliament and deputy convenor of the parliamentary Equalities, Human Rights and Civil Justice Committee, condemned the judgement, stating that the Supreme Court had engaged in "bigotry, prejudice and hatred". Her comments were condemned by Akua Reindorf KC, a Commissioner at the Equality and Human Rights Commission; the Faculty of Advocates, which described them as failing to "respect the rule of law"; and a number of senior lawyers, including King's Counsel. Joanna Cherry called for Chapman to resign, whilst a motion brought by Conservative MSP Tess White to have Chapman removed from her Committee position over the issue was unsuccessful.

The Welsh Government released a statement accepting the decision of the Supreme Court, noting that the judgement did not remove protection from trans people, and reaffirming an ongoing commitment to equality and inclusion.

Following the ruling, a spokesperson for the Republic of Ireland's Equality Minister, Norma Foley, stated that the ruling would not impact trans people in Ireland.

=== Celebrities ===
J. K. Rowling, who had donated £70,000 to For Women Scotland in support of the case, made a series of posts on Twitter celebrating 16 April as "TERF VE Day". Many other celebrities, however, publicly displayed the slogan "Protect the Dolls" in the immediate aftermath of the decision, the slogan being worn on clothing by a wide array of actors, models, musicians, and artists in support of the rights of trans women.

On 23 April 2025, an open letter was addressed to the UK arts and culture sector, calling for it to "meet this moment with bravery and solidarity", amid the ruling and the growing number of hate crimes targeting the trans community. The letter was signed by over 1,300 writers across the British literature and screenwriting industries, including Michaela Coel, Russell T Davies, and Alice Oseman.

=== International ===
ILGA-Europe, which ranks countries based on their LGBTQ rights protections, dropped the United Kingdom to 22nd in Europe – the lowest position for the UK since the rankings started in 2009. Between 2011 and 2015, it had been ranked at the top of the list. All points related to legal gender recognition were removed in response to the ruling and EHRC guidance. ILGA stated: "It is, in fact, impossible for a trans person to be fully legally recognised in their gender identity within the legal framework created by the judgment and interim update."

Australia's sex discrimination commissioner Anna Cody condemned the ruling.

== Subsequent EHRC guidance ==
Following the decision, Kishwer Falkner, chair of the Equality and Human Rights Commission (EHRC), stated that its upcoming code of practice will recognise the ruling by excluding trans women from single-sex spaces, including women's sports and changing spaces, and that the NHS would "have to change" its policy of treating transgender patients in accordance with their declared gender.

Revised guidance was laid before Parliament on 21 May 2026, with 40 days for legislators to raise concerns before becoming statute. The guidance covered facilities and services open to the public, but not staff facilities, with guidance relating to that to be published at a later date. This guidance indicated single-sex spaces should be used on the basis of biological sex, and that a third or gender-neutral space could be offered to transgender people. In the Equality Impact Assessment, the Office of Equality and Opportunity says that there are concerns of "double exclusion", where it is possible that trans people are barred from both the space aligned with their gender and the space aligned with their birth sex, effectively leaving them with no service at all. Their assessment is the likely impact on trans people is negative. There are also concerns of "policing of gender", which could lead to increased harassment for trans people and cisgender people who do not conform to traditional gender stereotypes.

=== Litigation ===
On 16 May, the Good Law Project sent a letter before action to the EHRC, stating their guidance "authorises and approves unlawful discrimination" and they would "be challenging that guidance on the basis that it is irrational and/or wrong in law". They further stated that if the EHRC interpretation was correct, it would place the UK in breach of the Human Rights Act 1998. The case was heard at the High Court in November 2025, with advocacy group Sex Matters allowed to present an intervention. In February 2026, the court dismissed the challenge and rejected all grounds argued.

=== Impact ===
On 29 June 2025, Keir Starmer stated that he "welcomed the ruling and everything else flows from that", adding that "all guidance of whatever kind needs to be consistent with the ruling and we need to get to that position as soon as possible". British Transport Police confirmed that the strip-search policy would be so that trans women in custody who were required to be strip searched would have this done by male officers. Both the House of Commons and Scottish Parliamentary Corporate Body announced that unisex toilet facilities in Westminster and Holyrood would only be allowed to persons of the corresponding biological sex, with trans people also being able to use gender-neutral and accessible toilets. In December 2025, the Labour Party barred trans women from taking part in the formal proceedings of their women's conference in 2026.

Following the ruling and subsequent EHRC guidance, a number of sports clubs and bodies announced bans on transgender women playing in women's sports, including the Scottish Football Association, which banned transgender women from participating in women's football from the next season; The Football Association in England; England Netball; and the England and Wales Cricket Board. The Women's Institute and Girlguiding also announced that it could no longer allow trans women and girls to be members as a result of legal advice they received.

=== Criticism ===
The EHRC interim guidance was described by transgender campaigners as a "bigoted attempt to segregate trans people in public spaces", with campaign groups warning about forced outing and harmful effects on trans lives, and stating it could be in violation of the European Convention on Human Rights. The Green Party co-leaders issued a statement that the guidance was "ill-considered and impractical" and "could put trans people at risk of discrimination in the workplace, and is overly prescriptive in a way that seems to fly in the face of the tolerance that we value in this country". They stated "it doesn't seem right that a lesbian organisation or space that wants to include trans women should be prevented from doing so".

Ahead of the International Day Against Homophobia, Biphobia and Transphobia on 17 May, 23 Pride organisations in Scotland issued a joint statement that they were "deeply alarmed by the escalation in the demonisation of LGBTQIA+ people, particularly trans individuals, both at home and abroad", stating that the ruling and EHRC interim guidance are a "serious threat to the rights of trans people". They further criticised "the influence of the anti-LGBTQIA+ lobby in both the UK and Scottish Governments".

In June, an estimated 900 trans people and their supporters (including Kate Nash) demonstrated at Parliament in June, seeking to meet with MPs to advocate against anti-trans positions. According to Diva, the protest surpassed the number of demonstrators who protested against section 28 in the 1980s.

In late June, leading UK trans groups issued a joint letter to the Council of Europe's Committee on Legal Affairs and Human Rights to express their "grave concerns" over current UK trans rights policies, specifically criticising the EHRC and arguing they violated the European Convention on Human Rights. In July, TransLuscent requested that the Global Alliance of National Human Rights Institutions investigate the EHRC, arguing its conduct following the ruling had been unlawful and in violation of the Paris Principles.

On 30 June 2025, the Lemkin Institute for Genocide Prevention issued a Red Flag Alert for the genocide of transgender and intersex people in the United Kingdom, noting similarities of the UK's policy to the 9th Pattern of Genocide. The institute believe that "the practical repercussions for trans and intersex individuals are clear and serious" and that: "If the guidance does become law, it would make transition impossible in the UK. Life as a transitioned person would become unbearable".

== Subsequent judicial developments ==
Victoria McCloud announced an intention to take the case to the European Court of Human Rights on the grounds that it failed to hear the human rights arguments from individuals, and stating that the judgement "has left me two sexes at once, which is a nonsense".

A county court applied the For Women Scotland (FWS) decision to a discrimination case by a trans woman against the English Blackball Pool Federation in ruling against the claimant.

=== Costs ===
On 27 May 2025, the Supreme Court confirmed that the Scottish Government would be required to pay For Women Scotland's costs and expenses. In February 2026, For Women Scotland received £392,500 as full and final settlement.

=== For Women Scotland 3 ===
In 2026, For Women Scotland won a separate victory over The Scottish Ministers, in the Court of Session, a case referred to as For Women Scotland 3 (the Court of Session case in For Women Scotland being FWS 1, and the Supreme Court judgment being FWS 2). This found that Scottish prison policy, which allowed transgender prisoners to be in the prison of their preferred gender, was unlawful, and that sex segregation in prisons must only be on the basis of biological sex, building on the judgment in FWS 2.

== Legal significance and commentary ==
The leading decision effects potentially far reaching changes to English law and Scottish law, including in employment law, family law, statutory interpretation, and human rights law. Although the judgment stated that it was solely concerned with the definitions under the Equality Act 2010, its interpretation of the 'carve-out' section 9(3) of the Gender Recognition Act 2004 was a general one and not confined to the EA 2010. The decision has been noted for using trans-exclusionary language, labelling trans women as "men" and trans men as "women".

Labour peer and former Minister for Women and Equality Harriet Harman said that the ruling of the Supreme Court gave effect to her intention when drafting the Equality Act. At the same time, Melanie Field, a former civil servant who was the lead official of the EA 2010, said that it was the "clear premise" of the Act that transgender women with GRCs would be recognised as women, warning against the "unintended consequences" of the decision.

Shreya Atrey, an associate professor in international human rights law at Oxford, has suggested that the Supreme Court justices failed to understand fully the context and purpose of the EA 2010, as theories of equality law are rooted in concepts of "autonomy, political exclusion, denial of dignity, and a history of disadvantage", and not in biological or social grounds. She finds that the Supreme Court "has undone the meaning of grounds which had developed in the UK since the first equality legislation came into force", so the For Women Scotland case "has fundamentally reshaped equality law in the UK."

Good Law Project founder Jolyon Maugham criticised the lack of testimony from either trans individuals or advocacy groups in the proceedings, noting in the case of the latter that they likely did not apply to be heard because of potential repercussions by the public, media and state.

The British Medical Association's Resident Doctors Committee passed a motion at their annual conference which condemned the Supreme Court's interpretation of sex as "reductive, trans- and intersex-exclusionary and biologically nonsensical" as well as "scientifically illiterate" and made without consulting relevant stakeholders. One of the intervenors in the case, Sex Matters, criticised the motion. The ruling also did not mention intersex people.

== See also ==
- Anti-gender movement
- Gender Recognition Reform (Scotland) Bill (2023)
- List of executive orders in the second presidency of Donald Trump
  - Executive Order 14151 ("Ending Radical and Wasteful Government DEI Programs and Preferencing")
  - Executive Order 14183 ("Prioritizing Military Excellence and Readiness")
  - Executive Order 14187 ("Protecting Children from Chemical and Surgical Mutilation")
- Parental rights movement
- Sex Discrimination Act 1984 (Australia)
- Tickle v Giggle (2024)
- United States v. Skrmetti (605 US 495, 2025)
