= Kishwer Falkner, Baroness Falkner of Margravine =

British Baroness (born 1955)

The Right Honourable The Baroness Falkner of Margravine
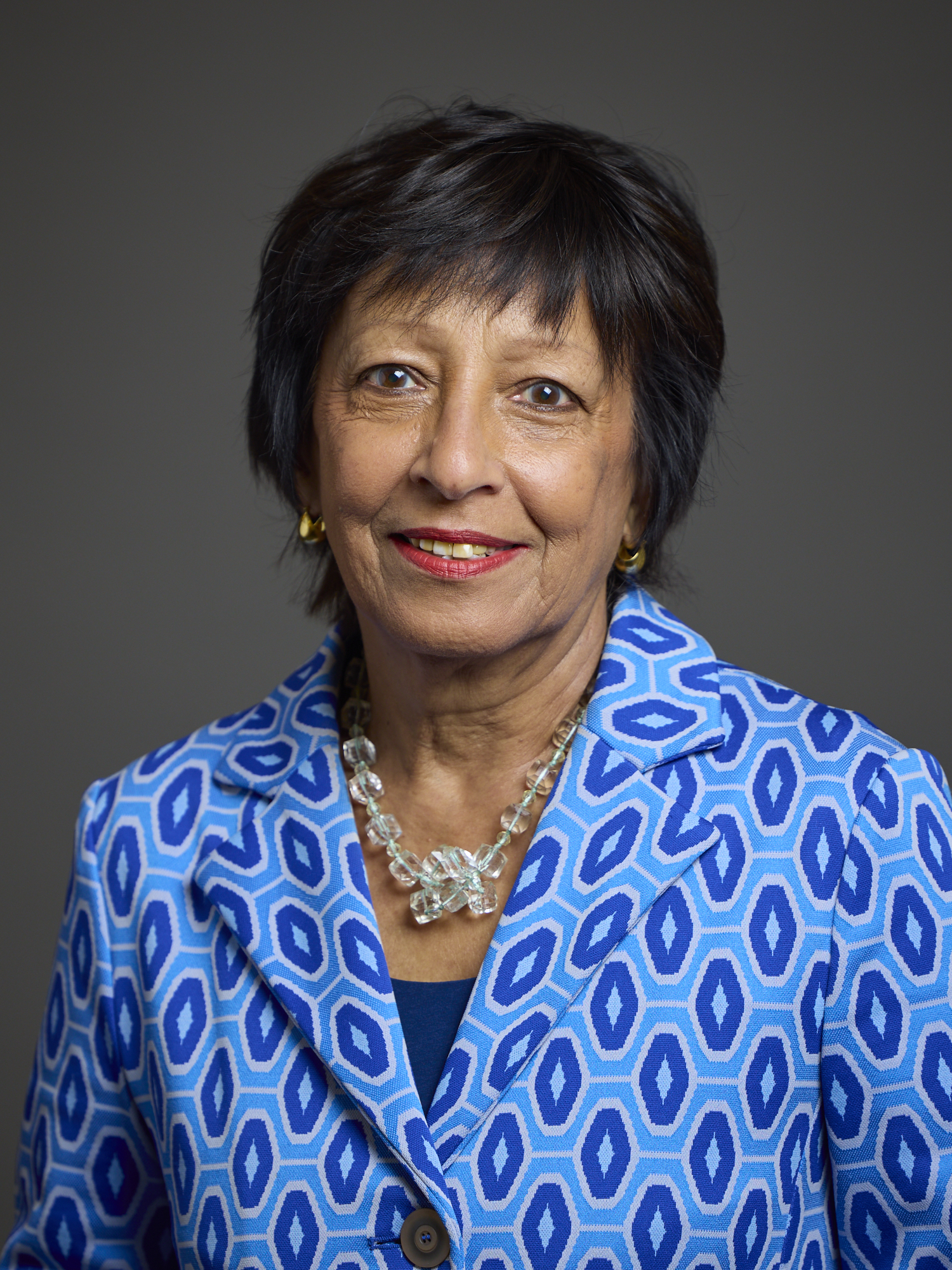
- Official portrait, 2026

Chair of the Equality and Human Rights Commission
- In office 1 December 2020 – 30 November 2025
- Preceded by: David Isaac
- Succeeded by: Mary-Ann Stephenson

Member of the House of Lords
- Lord Temporal
- Life peerage 2 June 2004

Personal details
- Born: Kishwer Khan; 9 March 1955 (age 71) Pakistan
- Party: None (crossbencher)
- Other political affiliations: None (non-affiliated) (2019–2020); Liberal Democrats (until 2019)
- Spouse: Robert Falkner (m. 1996)
- Children: 1
- Education: London School of Economics; University of Kent

Kishwer Falkner, Baroness Falkner of Margravine (née Khan; born 9 March 1955) is a British politician. She was appointed a life peer in 2004, initially sitting as a Liberal Democrat but latterly as a cross-bencher. She served the House of Lords on many committees, including as its Chairman of the European Union Financial Affairs Sub-Committee from 2015 to 2019. From December 2020 to December 2025 she chaired the Equality and Human Rights Commission (EHRC).

== Early life and education ==
Kishwer Falkner was born in Pakistan to a Muslim family who had left India at Partition. She was educated at St Joseph's Convent School, an all-girls private Catholic school in Karachi. After living and working in the Middle East, she moved to the UK in 1976. She studied international relations at the London School of Economics, graduating with a Bachelor of Science (BSc) degree in 1992. She also has a Master of Arts (MA) degree in international relations and European studies from the University of Kent.

== Career ==
Falkner worked in France and the United States before deciding to move back to the United Kingdom. She worked for the Liberal Democrats, including in senior policy positions, and at the Commonwealth Secretariat, on the broader issues of globalisation, democracy and development. She was Chief Executive 2003–2004 of Student Partnerships Worldwide (now Restless Development), a charity working with young people in some of the poorest parts of Africa and Asia. In February 2008, she was appointed as the inaugural chancellor of The University of Northampton.

In 2018, she was appointed an inaugural member of the Bank of England's Enforcement Decision Making Committee. As of 2019, she was an honorary associate of the National Secular Society. She served the British Library Advisory Council from 2015 to 2020.

=== Political career ===
Falkner joined the Liberal Democrats in the mid-1980s and worked at the party's headquarters throughout the 1990s, shaping policy. She served as the LibDem's director of international affairs (1993–99) and director of policy (1997–99), when she co-authored much of the party's policy on the European Union, and coordinated a joint response for European Liberals on issues related to Europe's structures and place in the world. She contested Kensington and Chelsea in the 2001 General Election and was on their list for London in the 2004 European elections.

On 2 June 2004, Falkner was created a life peer, i.e. was appointed to the upper chamber of the British Parliament. From 2 June 2004 to 24 July 2019, she sat in the House of Lords as a Liberal Democrat peer. Then, from July 2019 to September 2020, she sat as a non-affiliated peer. Since 3 September 2020, she has sat as a crossbencher.

=== EHRC head ===
On 1 December 2020, she began a five-year term as chair of the Equality and Human Rights Commission (EHRC), the non-departmental public body responsible for the promotion and enforcement of equality and non-discrimination laws. Falkner's time as head of this national human rights institution was extended for a fifth year by Bridget Phillipson, Minister for Women and Equalities Falkner's immediate predecessor was David Isaac, who had previously chaired Stonewall, the LGBT+ charity and advocacy group. Her successor from December 2025 is Dr Mary-Ann Stephenson, previously Director of the Women's Budget Group and the Fawcett Society.

In the early months of Falkner's appointment, the EHRC withdrew from Stonewall's "Diversity Champions" employment scheme, along with many other British employers. The EHRC intervened in the case of Forstater v Centre for Global Development Europe. The government had solicited submissions on reforming the Gender Recognition Act; researcher Maya Forstater had contributed to this discussion on social media, and lost her job at a think tank owing to her gender-critical views. The first employment tribunal had ruled against Forstater; the EHRC supported her appeal, both as a matter of freedom of belief and freedom of expression. Falkner justified the EHRC's interest in this case in her first interview in post. More broadly, she argued that women had the right to challenge transgender identity without fear of abuse, stigmatisation or loss of employment. She also raised concerns about anonymous online abuse, stating that social media companies needed to take more responsibility. In the area of racial equality, she argued for a measurement of ethnic pay gaps, akin to the way the gender pay gap is tracked.

Following this interview in May 2021, Falkner faced criticism accusing the EHRC of becoming politicised and transphobic. The Consortium of LGBT Voluntary and Community Organisations UK organised an open letter claiming that the EHRC had done little for transgender rights in the United Kingdom, and that its intervention in the Forstater case led to the EHRC losing "the trust of trans people and LGBTQ+ people more broadly". Several former and current staff members described the public body as "transphobic", "anti-LGBT+" and an "enemy of human rights", and several were said to have resigned in protest at its "descent into transphobia".

However, others defended her. Janice Turner wrote in The Times: "Falkner is accused of politicising the EHRC, yet in fact she is merely depoliticising her predecessor’s regime. Her first act was to withdraw the EHRC from the Stonewall Champions scheme, which had meant that under her predecessor David Isaac (ex-chairman of Stonewall) a government body whose core mission is to balance all human rights was following rules set by one lobby group alone."

In 2023 Falkner faced 40 complaints from 12 current or former staff members "of bullying and harassment". In May an independent lawyer was appointed to investigate these complaints, the nature of which were not disclosed. Leading articles (editorials) in The Times characterised the complaints as a "smear campaign" and a "hit job", falsely accusing her of bullying. The investigation was soon suspended "following a backlash from 54 peers and outcry across the political spectrum". It restarted in July but was closed in October, following a review of the Commission's handling of complaints, initiated by the Minister for Women and Equalities, Kemi Badenoch. Falkner remained in her position as Chair; the board apologised to her, and recompensed her for "a good portion" of her legal fees, with the backing of the Treasury.

Following the gender-critical victory in For Women Scotland Ltd v The Scottish Ministers, Falkner stated on Today that the ruling would be incorporated into its upcoming code of practice for women-only spaces enforceable by law. Falkner warned that "single-sex services like changing rooms must be based on biological sex", trans women would be prohibited from competing in women's sport, and stated that the NHS would "have to change" its policy of treating transgender patients in accordance with their declared gender. However, when asked if gender recognition certificates have now been rendered worthless, Falkner said: "We don't believe they are. We think they're quite important." Falkner also suggested that trans rights groups should use their advocacy to campaign for unisex spaces (such as toilets), as it was not a legal requirement for facilities to have gender-specific spaces.

Shortly thereafter, the EHRC released updated interim guidance in line with the ruling, declaring trans women to be "biological men" and trans men to be "biological women". The guidance applied to any school, workplace, sporting body, publicly accessible service (such as restaurants, shops, hospitals, or shelters), and any association of 25 people or more. The guidance stated that while trans women and trans men should be barred from facilities matching their gender, they can also be restricted from facilities matching their assigned sex, and that only providing mixed-sex facilities could constitute discrimination against women. It did, however, say that trans people should not be left without any facilities to use. The guidance also stated that transgender men and women should be barred from gay men's spaces and lesbian spaces respectively.

== Personal life ==
Falkner acquired United Kingdom citizenship in 1983. She is married to Robert Falkner, Professor of International Relations at the London School of Economics and Political Science (LSE). The couple have one daughter.

== Electoral history ==
General election 2001: Kensington and Chelsea
Party	Candidate	Votes	%	±%
Conservative	Michael Portillo	15,270	54.5	+0.9
Labour	Simon Stanley	6,499	23.2	–4.7
Liberal Democrats	Kishwer Falkner	4,416	15.8	+0.5
Green	Julia Stephenson	1,158	4.1	N/A
UKIP	Damian Hockney	416	1.5	N/A
ProLife Alliance	Josephine Quintavalle	179	0.6	New
Majority		8,771	31.3	+5.6
Turnout		28,038	43.3	–11.4
Conservative hold		Swing	+2.8	
