= Jo Phoenix =

British criminologist and academic

Joanna Phoenix
- Born: 1964 (age 61–62)
- Known for: Academic author and feminist researcher in criminology

Joanna Phoenix (born 1964) is a British academic author and professor of criminology in the United Kingdom. Phoenix writes about the policies and laws which surround various sexual activities and the social conditions which underpin them.

She is known for her gender critical views, in particular for asserting the right of women prisoners not to be incarcerated with biological males. She was subjected to criticism and harassment for expressing these views as part of her academic work. In 2021 the University of Essex apologised to her for the cancellation of a speech she was due to make. In January 2024 an employment tribunal found she had suffered victimisation, harassment and discrimination whilst working at the Open University.

== Career ==
Phoenix has held academic posts as lecturer in criminology at the University of Middlesex from 1998 to 2000, the University of Bath until 2000 and a variety of posts at the University of Durham until 2013 (reader in criminology, made professor in 2010, deputy head of the Faculty of Social Sciences and Health, Dean of Queens Campus) and Head of the law department at the University of Leicester. She was Professor of Criminology at the Open University, before moving to University of Reading. Phoenix is a trustee of the Centre for Crime and Justice Studies.

Her research areas include sex, gender, sexualities, prostitution policy and the experience of women in prison.

== Writing ==
Phoenix has written two books, Making Sense of Prostitution (1999) and Illegal and Illicit: Sex, Regulation and Social Control (with Sarah Oerton). She edited Regulating Sex for Sale and several articles and book chapters on the sex industry and experiences of supporting transgender persons in the prison estate.

Julia O'Connell Davidson, writing in The American Journal of Sociology, described Making Sense of Prostitution as "a study of outstanding depth and perspicacity that makes an important contribution to the body of empirical evidence on prostitution". Merl Storr, writing in Feminist Review, found the policy section weak, the sample size too small, and wanted additional information about the people interviewed; but she concluded that the book's "solid refusal to flatten the contradictions of prostitution will certainly make the book valuable to teachers and researchers in the field". Maggie O'Neill, writing in Work, Employment & Society, described the book as "a fascinating account of the author's research into the lives of twenty-one women working as prostitutes in 'mid-city' ... The section on violence is very thorough, well researched and argued and adds a great deal to the available literature on violence against women working as prostitutes". Jane Scoular writes that her books describe "the paradox that cannot have escaped the attention of many readers in the field: that the apparent increase in freedom, choice, and diversity in sexual matters is conversely and simultaneously matched by a 'proliferation of laws, policies and guidelines which seek to determine the complex, vast and ever-increasing rules of engagement'".

== Activism ==
Phoenix gave evidence to the UK Parliament regarding the multiple disadvantages that women experience in the criminal justice system, particularly working-class women and women of colour. In relation to community-based punishments and services, she lobbied for continued provision of single sex spaces for cisgender female prisoners and for development of equivalent but separate services for trans and gender-diverse people.

== Expert witness ==
In 2025 Phoenix was an expert witness in the case of the Darlington nurses who found that their employer, an NHS Trust, had undermined their dignity by a failure to provide single-sex spaces. As an expert in the experiences of women working as prostitutes, Phoenix gave evidence to the Scottish Parliament's Criminal Justice Committee in support of Ash Regan's Prostitution (Offences and Support) (Scotland) Bill.

== Freedom of speech ==
=== University of Essex ===
Phoenix is one of the two academic speakers (along with Rosa Freedman) who received an apology from the University of Essex in 2021 after Phoenix's invitation to speak about transgender rights in prisons was withdrawn at short notice due to students claiming that Phoenix is transphobic. In November 2021, Phoenix welcomed legal action against the University of Essex, claiming its policies breach free speech legislation. The Free Speech Union, led by Toby Young, took the action. An investigation found the decision to withdraw the invitation "amounted to a breach of Prof Phoenix's right to freedom of expression". The ensuing report is known as the Reindorf Report after the barrister in the case, Akua Reindorf.

=== The Open University ===
==== Gender Critical Research Network ====
In June 2021, Phoenix (where she was a professor of criminology) and Jon Pike (a researcher in philosophy of sport), convened the Gender Critical Research Network (GCRN) at the Open University. The network aims to "bring together a range of academics and scholars, all of which share a common interest in exploring how 'sexed' bodies come to matter in their respective research fields and a common commitment to ensuring that a space within academia is kept open for those explorations". Philosopher Kathleen Stock and Historian Selina Todd are members.

In an open letter signed by 368 people, which called on the Open University to withhold support and funding, the network was criticised and described in the letter as transphobic. The letter said the network was "hostile to the rights of trans people" and said that academic freedom should not be "at the expense of marginalised groups". Phoenix has stated formally that she supports "the rights of trans individuals to be fully protected by the Equality Act and welcome government reform of the Gender Recognition Act in ways that are sympathetic to their needs" but proposes that an individual's right to identify as a particular gender should not be the basis upon which provision of criminal justice is based. In her subsequent action against the University for constructive dismissal, this open letter was cited by the employment tribunal as one of the instances of harassment against Phoenix by her colleagues.

==== Action for constructive dismissal ====
In 2021, Phoenix began a process of bringing a constructive dismissal case against the Open University (her employer) for not protecting her against harassment in the workplace. She stated that she hoped the "case will help to establish a line in the sand and make it clear that baseless accusations of transphobia simply for standing up for the rights of women is harassment especially when made in an academic context". She left the Open University to take up a professorial role in the law school at the University of Reading. In November 2021, the Open University's vice-chancellor's executive team stated that "the formation of the GCRN was compatible with academic freedom, while also acknowledging that some staff found the content of the group's work to be challenging or concerning" and undertook to review of its own policies and procedures.

In January 2024, the Tribunal found in her favour. The judgment said that she had been constructively unfairly dismissed, and that she had suffered victimisation, harassment (which included being compared by her Head of Department to a "racist uncle"), and direct discrimination by the Open University, which did not allow her to speak about her negative treatment in department meetings due to her research, and failed to protect her from deplatforming campaigns and being called a "transphobe" or "TERF" on social media. In March 2024, Professor Phoenix announced that she had agreed a compensation settlement with the Open University. The amount to be paid was not disclosed. In an apology issued following the 2024 tribunal ruling, Professor Tim Blackman, Vice-Chancellor of The Open University, stated that "The University has supported and continues to support the work of the Gender Critical Research Network (GCRN) as part of the many important research activities that take place at the OU", and "The tribunal ruling makes it clear that we should have acted differently to address the impact of this reaction on Professor Phoenix and the working environment that she experienced."

== Personal life ==
Phoenix has Ehlers–Danlos syndrome. She and her partner, a glass artist, have been together since 2005.
