= International Journal of Sociology =

- Discipline: Sociology
- Language: English
- Edited by: Markus Hadler

Publication details
- History: 1971-present
- Publisher: Taylor and Francis
- Frequency: bimonthly

Standard abbreviations
- ISO 4: Int. J. Sociol.

Indexing
- ISSN: 0020-7659 (print); 1557-9336 (web)
- LCCN: 73025732
- JSTOR: 00207659
- OCLC no.: 50388384

Links
- Journal homepage; Online access; Online archive

The International Journal of Sociology is a bimonthly (since 2019, 1971-2018 quarterly) peer-reviewed academic journal that covers the field of sociology. It was established 1971 and is published by Taylor and Francis. The journal's editor-in-chief is Markus Hadler (University of Graz).

== Abstracting and indexing ==
The journal is abstracted and indexed in:

- Academic OneFile
- Academic Search Complete
- ArticleFirst
- Association for Asian Studies
- Bibliography of Asian Studies
- Business Source Corporate
- Communication and Mass Media Complete
- Criminal Justice Collection
- CSA Environmental Sciences & Pollution Management Database
- CSA Social Services Abstracts
- CSA Sociological Abstracts
- Current abstracts
- De Gruyter Saur
- Dietrich's Index Philosophicus
- EBSCOhost
- Electronic Collections Online
- Emerging Sources Citation Index
- E-psyche
- Expanded Academic ASAP
- FRANCIS
- Gale
- General OneFile
- InfoTrac Custom
- International Bibliography of Periodical Literature (IBZ)
- National Library of Medicine
- OCLC
- PAIS International
- Periodicals Index Online
- Political Science Complete
- ProQuest
- Psychology Collection
- Public Affairs Index
- PubMed
- Risk Abstracts
- Russian Academy of Sciences Bibliographies
- SocINDEX
- Social Sciences Index
- Scopus
- TOC Premier
- H. W. Wilson
- Worldwide Political Science Abstracts
- Web of Science
