= Rosa Freedman =

Human rights researcher and professor

- Born: Rosa Anne Freedman
- Education: Queen Mary University of London
- Occupation: Legal academic
- Known for: Feminist views, Human rights activism and fighting injustice
- Website: rosafreedman.com

Rosa Anne Freedman, who has written as Rosa Davis, is a British professor of law, conflict, and global development at the University of Reading. Her principal area of research is the activities of the United Nations as they relate to human rights. She has given evidence before the Foreign Affairs Select Committee of the House of Commons of the United Kingdom about the human rights work of the Foreign and Commonwealth Office, and to the Scottish Government relating to gender questions on the national census.

== Early life ==
Rosa Freedman was born in 1983 in London where she was also raised. She is Jewish. She has spoken about being a survivor of sexual violence. She acquired her Bachelor of Laws (LLB) at Queen Mary University of London (2002–2005), and her Master of Laws (LLM) at University College London (2005–06). She took the Bar Vocational Course at City University of London in 2006–07 and qualified as a barrister of Gray's Inn. She acquired her PhD in law at Queen Mary University of London in 2011 for a thesis on the United Nations Human Rights Council.

She spent a year in a religious seminary in Jerusalem.

== Career ==
Freedman was a senior lecturer at the University of Birmingham from 2014 to 2016 and then became professor of law, conflict, and global development at the University of Reading in 2016. Her first book was The United Nations Human Rights Council: A Critique and Early Assessment, based on her PhD research, and published by Routledge in 2013. In 2014, she published a further book relating to her research titled Failing to Protect: The UN and the Politicisation of Human Rights.

In June 2018, she gave evidence before the Foreign Affairs Select Committee of the House of Commons about the human rights work of the Foreign and Commonwealth Office. Also in 2018, in her response to the Scottish Government's proposal to change gender rules in the national census, she warned that "conflating sex and gender identity will undermine sex as a separate category protected by law".

She spoke at an event at the Edinburgh Law School, which attracted media coverage for the gender critical views advanced by Freedman and other speakers, including Jo Phoenix. In December 2018, she described receiving abuse on the basis of her continuing opposition to transgender rights. Freedman was invited to take part in an event at University of Essex in 2020 as part of the University’s Holocaust Memorial Week event. The invitation was effectively rescinded at short notice, due to her views on sex and gender. Following the independent Reindorf Review, which suggested the university may have acted unlawfully, she received an apology from the university.

Freedman is the joint editor of Responses to 7 October: Antisemitic Discourse (Studies in Contemporary Antisemitism), a collection of essays about responses to the events of 7 October 2023 in Israel and the subsequent conflict in Gaza. She is a Zionist. She is President of the Intra-Communal Professorial Group, the Jewish academic network addressing anti-Semitism in UK universities.

Freedman is an Associate Member of 4-5 Gray's Inn Square, a set of barristers' chambers in London.

== Personal life ==
Freedman is married and observes Orthodox Judaism. She is a supporter of Arsenal F.C..

== Selected publications ==
- The United Nations Human Rights Council: A Critique and Early Assessment. Routledge, Abingdon, 2013. ISBN 9780415640329
- Failing to Protect: The UN and the Politicisation of Human Rights. Hurst & Company, London, 2014.
