= Disability Rights Commission =

UK disability rights organization

The Disability Rights Commission (DRC) was established by the British Labour government in 1999. At that time, the DRC was the UK's third equality commission alongside the Commission for Racial Equality and the Equal Opportunities Commission. The commission was established by the Disability Rights Commission Act 1999. Its chairman from 2000 to 2007 was Bert Massie.

The DRC was charged with reviewing the Disability Discrimination Act 1995 and recommending its amendment. It had rights of investigation and enforcement of disability legislation, and was responsible for advising employers on how to secure equal acceptance of disabled employees in the workplace. The DRC replaced an earlier and weaker body, the National Disability Council, established by the Conservatives in the 1990s.

The passing of the Equality Act 2006 means that in October 2007, the DRC was replaced by a new Equality and Human Rights Commission with powers across all equality law (race, sex, disability, religion and belief, sexual orientation and age).

The DRC was a non-departmental public body (NDPB) of the Department for Work and Pensions. Its head office was in Manchester city centre with other offices in central London, Cardiff and Edinburgh.
