= Equality and Human Rights Commission =

Non-departmental public body in Great Britain

- Welsh: Comisiwn Cydraddoldeb a Hawliau Dynol

Agency overview
- Formed: 1 October 2007
- Jurisdiction: Great Britain
- Employees: 193
- Annual budget: £17.15 million (FY 25/26)
- Agency executives: Mary-Ann Stephenson, chair; John Kirkpatrick, chief executive; Lesley Sawers, interim deputy chair; Scotland commissioner
- Parent department: Cabinet Office
- Key document: Equality Act 2006
- Website: https://www.equalityhumanrights.com

The Equality and Human Rights Commission (EHRC) is a non-departmental public body in Great Britain, established by the Equality Act 2006 with effect from 1 October 2007. The Commission has responsibility for the promotion and enforcement of equality and non-discrimination laws in England, Scotland and Wales (in Scotland, together with the Scottish Human Rights Commission). It took over the responsibilities of the Commission for Racial Equality, the Equal Opportunities Commission and the Disability Rights Commission. The EHRC also has responsibility for other aspects of equality law: age, sexual orientation and religion or belief. A national human rights institution, its function is to promote and protect human rights throughout Great Britain.

The EHRC has offices in Manchester, London, Glasgow and Cardiff. It is a non-departmental public body (NDPB) sponsored by the Office for Equality and Opportunity (OEO), part of the Cabinet Office. It is separate from, and independent of, Government but accountable for its use of public funds. Its Commissioners are appointed by the Minister for Women and Equalities. The EHRC's functions do not extend to Northern Ireland, where there is a separate Equality Commission (ECNI) and a Human Rights Commission (NIHRC), both established under the Northern Ireland Act 1998 in pursuance to the Belfast/Good Friday Agreement. The EHRC is also prevented from taking action on devolved human rights matters for which the Scottish Parliament has granted the Scottish Human Rights Commission responsibility.

The current chair of the EHRC is Dr. Mary-Ann Stephenson, who took on the role in December 2025.

== Powers ==
The EHRC derives its powers from the Equality Act 2006, which resulted from the government white paper, Fairness for All: A New Commission for Equality and Human Rights. Section 3 states the EHRC has a general duty to work towards the development of a society where equality and rights are rooted. This is taken to mean,

- people's ability to achieve their potential is not limited by prejudice or discrimination,
- there is respect for and protection of each individual's human rights (including respect for the dignity and worth of each individual),
- each person has an equal opportunity to participate in society, and
- there is mutual respect between communities based on understanding and valuing of diversity and on shared respect for equality and human rights.

Section 30 strengthens the EHRC's ability to apply for judicial review and to intervene in court proceedings, through giving explicit statutory provision for such action. Sections 31–2 gives the EHRC a new power to assess public authorities' compliance with their positive equality duties. It can issue "compliance notices" if it finds a public authority is failing in its duties. Public authorities, importantly, are bound under the Human Rights Act 1998 to act in a way compatible with the European Convention on Human Rights (s.6 HRA). The EHRC's role is therefore one of catching matters before they lead to the courts. Public sector workers therefore have additional avenues to enforce equality standards. Public sector employers are consistently shown to have excellent workplace practices. Section 30(3) of the Equality Act 2006 allows the EHRC to bring judicial review proceedings under the HRA against public authorities. This is a stronger tool than usual, because the EHRC is not subject to the normal requirement of being a "victim" of a Human Rights violation.

Under section 24, the EHRC can enter into binding agreements with employers. So for instance, it can agree that an employer will commit to equality best practice audits or avoid discriminatory practices that it may identify, in return for not investigating (a bad thing for employers' publicity). It can enforce these agreements through injunctions. Previously only the Disability Rights Commission had such powers, the CRE and the EOC were more limited. For instance, the EOC used only to have the power to get injunctions against bodies with a bad track record of discrimination.

Section 20 gives the EHRC the power to carry out investigations when it has the "suspicion" of unlawful discrimination taking place. Before. this had been limited to a requirement of "reasonable suspicion" which in effect led the predecessors to be much more cautious. In legal terms this is the difference between an irrationality test and a reasonable man test. In other words, a court could not declare an investigation unlawful unless it considered that the EHRC was carrying out an investigation where no reasonable person could have come to the same conclusion. Before a court could declare an investigation unlawful if it thought that the proverbial "man on the Clapham Omnibus" would not regard an employer as being a suspect "discriminator".

There are some complications in relation to the Human Rights Act 1998 with the EHRC's powers. If it is going to be a "named investigation" (i.e. the employer will probably get shamed by the publication of its name during an investigation), the EHRC cannot start an investigation into a public authority for breaches under the HRA. Also, it cannot support individual cases in tribunals and courts where the issue would concern matters that fall only under the HRA and not under some pre-existing British equality legislation (like the Sex Discrimination Act 1975). Practically this will be problematic, not least because if a claim did exist under the HRA, British legislation which did not cover such problems would usually be updated to comply with European Convention rights (these are the ones that the HRA implements). Also, the line between what is in the European Convention, what is actually covered by domestic legislation, is difficult to draw. At any rate, section 28 gives the Minister the power to give authorisation for a discrimination case to be fought if a domestic legislation issue has dropped away, but a purely human rights issue remains.

As a successor body, the EHRC's new powers were not dramatic. Some people called for the changes to go further, for instance, to allow the EHRC to bring proceedings against employers in its own name on any issue (not just human rights ones). The American, Australian, Belgian, Canadian and New Zealand counterparts can.

== Campaigns ==
The Commission's campaigns include:

=== Care and Support (2010) ===
A report produced by the Commission highlighted the need to shift from a "safety net" approach to care to a "springboard". The report suggested ways that individuals could be given greater autonomy over their lives and encouraged to engage in society and make social and economic contributions.

=== Working Better Initiative (2016) ===
The Working Better Initiative was launched with a remit of coming up with innovative ways to meet the needs of modern workforce, with a particular focus on flexibility and family life.

== Leadership ==
The Board of Commissioners comprises commissioners with backgrounds in equality and human rights, and the Commission's chief executive. The current chair of the Commission is Dr. Mary-Ann Stephenson, who was appointed in late 2025. The chair serves as a spokesperson, and leader to the Commission together with the chief executive.

Chairs
Name	Tenure	Notes
Mary-Ann Stephenson	2025-present	
Kishwer Falkner	2020–2025	
David Isaac	2016–2020	
Onora O'Neill	2012–2016	
Trevor Phillips	2007–2012	

Meanwhile, commissioners act with accordance to the Nolan Principles, and whatever direction given to them on their appointment by the Minister for Women and Equalities. The deputy chair has the additional duty to cover for the chair in their absence.

Commissioners
Name	Notes
John Kirkpatrick	Chief executive
Alasdair Henderson	Interim chair of the Scotland Committee
Kunle Olulode	
Akua Reindorf	
Keith Richards	

== International status ==
Although it operates at sub-national level, the EHRC was in 2009 recognised as a member of the worldwide network of national human rights institutions, securing "A status" accreditation from the former International Co-ordinating Committee of NHRIs (ICC). This gives the Commission enhanced access to the Human Rights Council, treaty bodies and other United Nations human rights bodies. The EHRC was the second NHRI in the UK, following the creation of the Northern Ireland Human Rights Commission (NIHRC) in 1999, and preceding the Scottish Human Rights Commission. The three bodies share representation and voting rights in the ICC's successor, the Global Alliance of National Human Rights Institutions and its regional network, the European Network of National Human Rights Institutions.

The EHRC has since 2008 engaged in parallel reporting ("shadow reporting") at examinations of the UK under the UN and Council of Europe human rights treaties, and in the Universal Periodic Review. However, its the NIHRC and SHRC have been noted in recent years as being more engaged than the institutions with the process.

In 2008 the EHRC was designated as a part of the UK's independent mechanism responsible for promoting, monitoring and protecting the implementation of the Convention on the Rights of Persons with Disabilities. It shares this role with the other UK NHRIs and the Equality Commission for Northern Ireland.

== History ==
Trevor Phillips became head of the Commission for Racial Equality in 2003, and on its abolition in 2006 was appointed full-time chairman of its successor, the EHRC. Phillips' tenure as EHRC chairman (which at his request became a part-time position in 2009) was at times controversial. Under Phillips' leadership it was reported that six of the body's commissioners departed after expressing concerns about his leadership and probity and others were reported to be considering their position. Some of the first set of Commissioners resigned towards the end of their first term, while others did not seek a second term. These Commissioners included Morag Alexander, Kay Allen, Baroness Campbell of Surbiton, Jeannie Drake CBE, Joel Edwards, Mike Smith, Professor Kay Hampton, Francesca Klug, Sir Bert Massie CBE, Ziauddin Sardar, Ben Summerskill and Dr Neil Wooding. Klug, who resigned in summer 2009, described a culture of intimidation at the Commission, while Hamptom said Phillips "didn't get human rights", Summerskill described a problem of nepotism, and Massie described it as "sluggish".

Nicola Brewer, the first chief executive (and ex officio Commissioner), resigned in March 2009 and returned to the diplomatic service. Her successor's salary was advertised at £120,000 (£65,000 less than she had been paid), a similar salary to its directors.

In 2010, Phillips was investigated regarding alleged attempts to influence a committee (the Joint Committee on Human Rights) writing a report on him. He would have been the first non-politician in over half a century to be convicted of this offence, but the Lords Committee found that the allegations were "subjective, and that no firm factual evidence is presented in their support; nor are they borne out by the submissions by individual members of the JCHR." He was cleared of contempt of Parliament and the House of Lords recommended that new and clearer guidance about the conduct of witnesses to Select Committees be issued. However, he was told his behaviour was "inappropriate and ill-advised".

Phillips completed his second term of office in September 2012, which, together with his term at the CRE made him the longest serving leader of any UK equality commission.

In 2006, Phillips asserted that Britain's current approach to multiculturalism could cause Britain to "sleepwalk towards segregation". He expanded on these views in 2016 in a publication by Civitas entitled Race and Faith: the Deafening Silence, in which he said that "squeamishness about addressing diversity and its discontents risks allowing our country to sleepwalk to a catastrophe that will set community against community, endorse sexist aggression, suppress freedom of expression, reverse hard-won civil liberties, and undermine the liberal democracy that has served this country so well for so long."

The second chair of the Commission was Onora O’Neill. She was an Emeritus Professor of Philosophy at the University of Cambridge, a former President of the British Academy.

The third chair of the Commission was David Isaac, appointed in 2016. Isaac was formerly chairman of LGBT charity Stonewall and trustee of the Diana, Princess of Wales Memorial Fund.

In 2017, the National Audit Office reported that the Commission's budget had been cut by almost 70% in the ten years since it was created, with plans for a further 25% reduction over the next four years.

Isaacs' tenure came to an end in August 2020. The interim chair was Caroline Waters (previously deputy chair), until the appointment of Kishwer Falkner, Baroness Falkner of Margravine the next Chair by the Liz Truss, Minister for Women and Equalities

In July 2025, it was announced that Mary-Ann Stephenson would become the chair of the Commission in December 2025. Prior to the announcement, the chairs of the women and equalities committee and the joint committee on human rights had written to the equalities minister Bridget Phillipson objecting to the proposed appointment on the grounds that Stephenson did not have the necessary experience. Stephenson said: "I have spent over 30 years building my career across the equality and human rights sector and I am delighted to have the opportunity to bring my insight and experience to lead the EHRC with compassion, honesty and dedication."

== Notable investigations ==
=== British National Party ===
Following the election of two MEPs from the British National Party (BNP) in the 2009 European elections, a potential issue of public funding was raised by the Commission as the BNP constitution stated that recruitment is only open to members who are "indigenous Caucasian and defined ethnic groups emanating from that Race" The Commission's legal director John Wadham stated that "The legal advice we have received indicates that the British National party's constitution and membership criteria, employment practices and provision of services to constituents and the public may breach discrimination laws which all political parties are legally obliged to uphold" This relates to the Race Relations Act 1976, which outlaws the refusal or deliberate omission to offer employment on the basis of non-membership of an organisation.

The EHRC asked the BNP to provide written undertakings that there will not be discrimination in its recruitment procedures. The party responded to the letter by stating that it "intends to clarify the word 'white' on its website". However, because the EHRC believed the BNP would continue to discriminate against potential or actual members on racial grounds, the commission announced that they had issued county court proceedings against it. In a statement, the Commission reduced the grounds on which it was taking action against the BNP, stating "The Commission believes the BNP's constitution and membership criteria are discriminatory and, further, that the continued publication of them on the BNP website is unlawful. It has therefore issued county court proceedings against party leader Nick Griffin and two other officials. The Commission decided not to take action on two further grounds set out in its letter before action, in the light of the BNP's commitment to comply with the law."

=== Metropolitan Police Service ===
In September 2016, the EHRC published a report on discrimination within the Metropolitan Police Service. The investigation was launched in response to concerns about the MPS's treatment of Black and minority ethnic (BME), female and gay officers and focused on the MPS's grievance and misconduct procedures.

=== Inequality ===
A 2018 EHRC report, co-authored by Jonathan Portes and Howard Reed, found government policies disproportionately harmed the poorest in UK society. Public service and benefits cuts disproportionately affect those with least, single parents and disabled people. This puts the government in breach of its human rights obligations. The study considers the extent of the cuts and their disproportionate effect on the most disadvantaged were a policy choice, and not inevitable.

The study investigates spending on the NHS, social care, police, transport, housing and education from 2010 to 2015 on different groups in England, Scotland and Wales. It also attempts to predict the effect of spending plans for these services to 2021–22, and alterations to taxes and benefits. Reductions per person since 2010 were notably higher in England, (roughly 18%) than in Wales (5.5%) and Scotland (1%), partly because devolved governments chose to reduce some effects of the cuts. The 20% of people in England with lowest income lost on average 11% of their incomes due to austerity contrasted with no losses for the wealthiest fifth of households. Lone-parent households lost most from tax and spending alterations, on average. In England, they lost 19% of their income, contrasted with 10.5% in Wales and 7.6% in Scotland. Large families lost more than smaller ones. Families with three or more children lost on average 13% of final income, contrasted with between 7% and 8% in Scotland and Wales. Households with disabled members, households with an average adult age of 18–24, and black households lost disproportionately from austerity cuts.

Making vulnerable groups suffer austerity cuts disproportionately goes against non-discrimination principles which the UK has agreed to under international human rights law. Ministers are asked by the authors to reduce the impact of austerity cuts through raising means-tested benefits, tax credits and universal credit, and increasing spending on health, social care, education and social housing.

Rebecca Hilsenrath of the EHRC said, "We know that some communities are being left behind and that the gap is widening. We know we need to do something before it's too late and we've shown that it's possible to assess public spending decisions to see if we can make the impact fairer."

=== Labour Party ===
In September 2017, EHRC Chief Executive, Rebecca Hilsenrath, demanded a zero tolerance approach to antisemitism in the Labour Party and swift action by the leadership to deal with it. In March 2019, Antony Lerman, former founding director of the Institute for Jewish Policy Research, raised concerns that Hilsenrath's September 2017 statement made her unsuitable to lead a probe into Labour, writing in OpenDemocracy: "Prior to investigation, is it not worrying that the CEO already claims to know what the Labour Party needs to do?" Hilsenrath later recused herself from the decision to investigate the Labour Party as her status as "an active member of the Anglo-Jewish community" could cause a perception of bias.

In May 2019, after submissions by the Jewish Labour Movement and the Campaign Against Antisemitism (CAA), the EHRC launched a formal investigation under section 20 of the Equality Act 2006 into whether Labour had "unlawfully discriminated against, harassed or victimised people because they are Jewish": specifically, whether "unlawful acts have been committed by the party and/or its employees and/or its agents, and; whether the party has responded to complaints of unlawful acts in a lawful, efficient and effective manner."

The CAA was represented in its case to the EHRC by Doughty Street Chambers barrister Adam Wagner, a member of the EHRC's panel of counsel.

According to Middle East Eye, Jewish Voice for Labour (JVL) welcomed the investigation but argued that, without making public the complaints the EHRC received and Labour's initial response, the EHRC have violated the Equality Act 2006 which requires that they specify who is being investigated and "the nature of the unlawful act" they are suspected of committing, as required by its own terms of reference.

In November 2019, JLM accused the Labour Party of "dirty tricks" against the EHRC for its lack of co-operation with the inquiry.

In December 2019, the JLM submission to the inquiry was leaked to the media. It included 70 sworn testimonies from current and former Party staff members, and concluded that "the Labour party is no longer a safe space for Jewish people".

Draft findings were passed to the Labour Party in July 2020, with 28 days to respond. In October 2020, the EHRC published its report, determining that the party was "responsible for unlawful acts of harassment and discrimination". The EHRC determined that there were 23 instances of political interference by staff from the leader's office and others and that Labour had breached the Equality Act in two cases. Former party leader Jeremy Corbyn was suspended from the party for several weeks and had the party parliamentary whip removed on 29 October 2020 "for a failure to retract" his assertion that the scale of antisemitism within Labour had been overstated by opponents.

In December 2020, Labour published its action plan on antisemitism in response to the EHRC report.

=== Windrush scandal ===
In June 2020, it was announced the Commission would investigate the UK Home Office over its hostile environment policy towards migrants under the Coalition and Conservative governments, and the ensuing Windrush scandal. The report was published in November 2020.

=== Conservative Party ===
The Muslim Council of Britain (MCB) first asked the EHRC to investigate the Conservative Party in May 2019. It received no reply and made a second request in November 2019 and again received no reply. In March 2020, the MCB submitted a dossier including 300 supposed cases of prejudiced or discriminatory language against Muslims within the Conservative Party. On 12 May, the EHRC announced that it would not be investigating the Conservative Party for racism, pending its monitoring of the party's own internal review.

=== Troxy ===
In November 2025, the EHRC started reviewing a formal complaint regarding Troxy, a live events venue in East London. The complaint, submitted by several British community groups and charities, alleged that the venue had refused to host musical events associated with Jewish organisations and singers, including American Jewish singer Benny Friedman and Orthodox Jewish singer Yaakov Shwekey. According to media reports by The Telegraph and The Standard, a number of event organisers claimed their bookings had been repeatedly declined since the 7 October attacks, with the Jewish Community Council raising concerns of potential discrimination and antisemitism. Troxy management denied any discriminatory intent, stating that all booking decisions were based on its "standard risk and safety assessments", rather than on faith or ethnicity.

== Involvement with disability rights issues ==
In November 2017, EHRC was granted permission to intervene in a High Court case concerning rules introduced by the Department of Work and Pensions (DWP) in February 2017 that made it harder for those with severe and enduring conditions, which include psychological distress, to get certain Personal Independence Payment (PIP) awards in comparison to other conditions or disabilities. The government lost the case in the High Court and agreed not to appeal the decision.

== Involvement with the gender-critical movement ==
=== Gender-critical views ===
In April 2021, the EHRC intervened in the legal appeal in the case of Forstater v Center for Global Development Europe, arguing that her gender-critical beliefs, as beliefs, were protected under the Equality Act 2010, and hence that the CGD's decision not to renew Forstater's contract over her philosophical beliefs could amount to illegal discrimination. Trans and LGBTQ+ organisations such as Mermaids and Stonewall criticised the EHRC for its intervention. Following this, the EHRC revealed that it had left Stonewall's Diversity Champions scheme in March 2021.

In October 2021, a group of academics published a letter in The Times calling on the EHRC to conduct a review of UK universities where, they said, policies were discriminating against those with gender-critical beliefs in the debate over transgender rights.

=== January 2022 statements on GRA reform and conversion therapy ===
On 26 January 2022 the EHRC wrote to Shona Robison, as Cabinet Secretary for Social Justice, Housing and Local Government for the Scottish Government, raising concerns about the proposed reforms to the Gender Recognition Act 2004 in Scotland, mentioning "the collection and use of data", "participation and drug testing in competitive sport" and "practices within the criminal justice system", key subjects of controversy for gender critical feminists. The EHRC also made a submission to the UK government's public consultation regarding LGBTQ+ conversion therapy on the same day, proposing that "consensual" efforts to change sexual orientation or gender identity should be excluded from any ban, stating that the terms "conversion therapy" and "transgender" were ill-defined, and making several arguments that have been described as associated with a "pro-conversion-therapy lobby".

The EHRC's letters were criticised by LGBTQ+ groups across the United Kingdom, including Stonewall, who said the statements "undermine EHRC's core purpose of regulating, promoting and upholding human rights" as well as calling for the Office of the United Nations High Commissioner for Human Rights and the Global Alliance of National Human Rights Institutions to urgently review the EHRC; Liberty, who endorsed the call for the EHRC's status as a national human rights institution to be reviewed, as did UK Black Pride and the LGBT Foundation, who also announced that they would sever ties with the EHRC; Amnesty International UK, who described the statements as "actively damaging to the rights of trans and non-binary people in the UK" and "deeply troubling"; domestic-abuse and hate-crime support organisation Galop, who said that the statement "makes it clear that [the EHRC has] not understood the reality of conversion therapy in the UK"; and LGBT+ Labour, who also expressed concern at the "deeply harmful amendments" submitted by members of the Parliamentary Labour Party in their role as UK delegates to the Council of Europe's Parliamentary Assembly. Other organisations criticising the EHRC's statements included Equality Network, UK umbrella organisation Consortium, the British LGBT Awards, LGBTQ+ youth charity akt, the Rainbow Project, Rainbow Greens, Trans in the City, the Feminist Gender Equality Network, Gendered Intelligence, Mermaids, Stonewall Housing, Pride Cymru, and Manchester Pride.

=== Definition of sex in the Equality Act ===
In 2023, Kemi Badenoch, the Minister for Women and Equalities, asked the EHRC for their advice on whether to amend the Equality Act 2010 to "clarify" that "sex", a protected characteristic, refers to "biological sex". Badenoch acted on the instruction of Prime Minister Rishi Sunak, who had said in his leadership campaign that "biology is critically important as we think about some of the very practical functions, like toilets or sports". In its response, published in April 2023, the EHRC said although there "is no straightforward balance" its view is that the amendment would "bring greater legal clarity" in a number of areas. For instance, it would enable trans people to be excluded from single-sex spaces even when they possess a gender recognition certificate (GRC).

Gender-critical campaign group Sex Matters, which petitioned to amend the act, welcomed the "measured and thoughtful analysis from the EHRC". LGBTQ+ charity Stonewall was angered, saying the move "risks opening yet another chapter in a manufactured culture war that will see little benefit to women, cis and trans alike". One former Legal Director of the EHRC described Sunak's proposed changes as "pure transphobia" and "based on misleading unevidenced transphobic assumptions".

In May 2023, UN independent expert Victor Madrigal-Borloz wrote that he was alarmed by the EHRC's letter to Badenoch in his end of mission statement. He said that the EHRC's objective "was to offer the government a formula through which it could carry out discriminatory distinctions currently unlawful under UK law", and that this action was "wholly unbecoming" of the institution. In the same month, 30 LGBTQ+ and human rights organisations wrote a letter to GANHRI, expressing concerns that the EHRC had failed to comply with the recommendations made by the body in its routine review in October 2022. In November 2023, GANHRI announced a special review into the EHRC, a process which could lead to the removal of its "A status". In a statement, Falkner said: "We are disappointed that we will have to defend our accreditation status in this way and remain very confident that we will be able to respond robustly to any questions." GANHRI released its findings during the April 2024 session on the SCA special review of the EHRC, concluding that at this time, no further review is required, allowing the EHRC to maintain its rating, but encouraging the EHRC to focus on the recommendations made by the SCA in 2023 and "encouraging the commission to engage with civil society organisations, including those working on transgender rights, in a meaningful and constructive manner."

Shortly following the judgment in For Women Scotland Ltd v The Scottish Ministers, on 25 April 2025, the EHRC issued an interim update in which they said that according to the judgment, trans women are "biological men" and trans men are "biological women", and that they must be excluded from sex-segregated spaces accordingly. The guidance applied to any school, workplace, sporting body, publicly accessible service (such as restaurants, shops, hospitals, or shelters), and any association of 25 people or more. The guidance stated that while trans women and trans men must be barred from the women's and men's facilities respectively, they could also be barred from the men's and women's as well, so long as there is at least one facility available for them to use. However, the guidance also stated that if only mixed-sex facilities were available, this could constitute discrimination against women, and that the presence of segregated spaces was compulsory in the workplace. The guidance also stated that women-only and lesbian-only groups must bar trans women from entry.

EHRC commissioner Akua Reindorf spoke after the judgment in a personal capacity and stated that trans people "have been lied to over many years" regarding their level of rights, and that they must accept a perceived reduction in rights for the sake of "correction" because "other people have rights".

In May 2026, the EHRC doubled down, stating that businesses and service providers must exclude transgender people from single-sex facilities which do not match their "biological sexes", as well as facilities that do match but in which a cis person might find their presence uncomfortable - such as a male-presenting trans man attending a women’s domestic violence support group. The EHRC also stated that businesses should still provide a third space for transgender people, such as gender-neutral toilets or a disabled bathroom. A report published on the British anti-trans movement by Amnesty International that same month identified the EHRC's guidance as a major event in the progression of said movement.

In June 2026, The Guardian reported that a number of Labour MPs were doubtful that the EHRC's guidance was workable. 135 MPs signed a motion calling for the code of practice to be blocked.

== Criticism ==
=== Conflicts of interest ===
Prior to David Isaac's appointment as chair of the Commission, two parliamentary committees warned that there was a potential conflict of interest because his legal firm, Pinsent Masons, carries out "significant work for the government", after he accepted that his annual legal income of over £500,000 would dwarf the £50,000 he would earn from the EHRC. While Christian Concern called for his appointment to be blocked, it was welcomed by The Jewish Chronicle. In May 2019, Suzanne Baxter, another EHRC board member, joined Pinsent Masons.

In June 2020, Newsweek reported that an EHRC commissioner, Pavita Cooper, had failed to declare a November 2013 £3,500 donation to the Conservative Party recorded on the Electoral Commission website and an October 2013 fundraising reception she and her husband hosted for her local party in Brentford and Isleworth, both prior to her appointment as a commissioner in 2018. The EHRC made a statement saying "Pavita Cooper has not made a donation to any political party and is not a member of any party."

After resigning as chair in 2020, Isaac said that the EHRC had been undermined by pressure to support the Conservative government's agenda. "My view is that an independent regulator shouldn't be in a position where the governments of the day can actually influence the appointments of that body to support a particular ideology," he told The Guardian.

=== Allegations of racism ===
In March 2017, the EHRC was criticised by campaigners, including Lord Ouseley and Peter Herbert, for allegedly targeting Black, Asian and Minority Ethnic (BAME) staff for compulsory redundancies and for failing to appoint BAME personnel to senior positions. The campaigners said that, out of 12 staff selected for redundancy, only two were white British, while eight were from a BAME background, four were Muslim, and six were disabled. Campaigners also said that there were no visible minorities among the senior management team, after the only black director was selected for redundancy, and that all two of the remaining BAME workers were on the bottom three pay grades. The EHRC denied claims that staff were sacked by email.

In July 2020, Newsweek reported that two BAME former commissioners at the EHRC, Baroness Meral Hussein-Ece and Lord Simon Woolley, said they were not reappointed to their roles in November 2012 because they were "too loud and vocal" about issues of race.

A former senior staff member of the EHRC has made a legal claim against it for racial discrimination and unfair dismissal. The hearing begins on 2 October 2023.

=== Allegations of transphobia ===
In February 2022, three whistleblowers – still working at the EHRC – told Vice about an "anti-LGBT" culture being adopted by senior leaders at the organisation which they said was causing non-executive staff to quit. Additionally, six senior staff members – who had either recently left the EHRC or were currently working their notice period – described board members changing their work to make documents "transphobic and seriously inaccurate". When some employees complained, they were locked out of laptops and disciplinary action was taken against them. Scottish National Party MP John Nicolson, Depute Chair of the All-Party Parliamentary Group on Global LGBT+ Rights in the UK Parliament, said: "Sadly the EHRC appears now to be working against, not for, LGBT rights. Our community no longer see it as our friend but as our opponent. It's yet another organisation tainted by Boris Johnson and his appointees."

The same month, Vice also reported that Falkner was in favour of excluding transgender people from "single-sex spaces" in workplaces and businesses, including bathrooms which match their gender identity. Conservative MP Crispin Blunt, chair of a UK Parliament oversight group for LGBTQ rights, described the EHRC's work as a "direct assault" on the rights of trans people in the UK. In response, an EHRC spokesperson said: "We acknowledge that some EHRC staff have been unhappy, which we regret, and we are working hard to explain decisions and why they are in line with our statutory responsibilities. Sex and gender reassignment are legally protected characteristics under the Equality Act 2010, as are seven other characteristics. The Human Rights Act 1998 protects all rights in a balanced and proportionate way. These are the laws that the EHRC upholds impartially and we totally refute your insinuations of bias in the areas you mention."

When asked in an interview with Holyrood if she was a transphobe, Falkner replied: "I don't know what the meaning of that word is." She said that the term was used too much, and in the same interview added: "We understand that there are strong views here, but I think we all want to get to the same end, and the end is to make life easier for trans people to live in the identity that they feel so strongly committed to. That's the end that I want to see too. It's just all we ask for, in getting to that end, is for the Scottish Government to navigate the road a little bit more carefully, because you don't improve trans people's rights by damaging another group's rights. And potentially, that can happen in this regard."

On 11 February 2022, a legal challenge was launched against the EHRC by Stonewall, with the backing of the Good Law Project and more than 20 other LGBT rights organisations. Stonewall drew up a submission to the Global Alliance of National Human Rights Institutions (GANHRI), calling for the EHRC to lose its "A rating" because of its treatment of trans people. This challenge was launched after the EHRC was criticised for asking the Scottish Government to pause its plans to make it easier for people to change their legal gender. The submission accused the organisation of being "excessively" influenced by the UK government in the appointments of the chair and board members. In April 2022, it was reported that the GANHRI declined the request. It will conduct a routine review in October 2022. Responding to the announcement, EHRC chief executive Marcial Boo said: "We are pleased that the Sub-Committee on Accreditation assessed evidence of our independence and effectiveness and upheld our position, declining a special review of our work." A spokesperson for Stonewall said that it and the other organisations involved in the challenge "are now focusing on this opportunity to collect and present evidence" to the upcoming review. Following the review in October 2022, conducted by the GANHRI, the EHRC retained its "A-status." Baroness Falkner, Chairwoman of EHRC said: "We are delighted that our vital work as a defender of human rights in this country has been recognised internationally again. I am proud of the powerful example we continue to set as a National Human Rights Institution on the global stage. This is a clear recognition of our status as an independent organisation with a proven track record promoting and upholding human rights."

=== Not investigating the Department of Work and Pensions ===
In June 2019, Labour MP Debbie Abrahams wrote to the EHRC, asking the commission to investigate a potential cover-up by the Department for Work and Pensions (DWP) of documents relating to the deaths of benefits claimants who had been sanctioned, as well as the way the department treatment of disabled people in general. Four months later, the EHRC announced that it was considering investigating the DWP.

However, the commission confirmed in June 2020 that no inquiry would take place. A spokesperson said: "The coronavirus pandemic has had a significant impact on our work, as it has on many other organisations. We have responded to Debbie Abrahams to say that we have given very careful consideration to the concerns she has rightly raised about the impact of DWP policies and practices on disabled people. It remains an important area of focus for us but due to the pandemic we will not be able to undertake an inquiry in relation to the DWP this year." A week later, Disability News Service revealed that the EHRC refused to consult its own disabled advisers before dropping the probe.

=== Investigation of Kishwer Falkner ===
In May 2023, a lawyer was appointed to investigate complaints by current and former EHRC staff against EHRC chair Kishwer Falkner of bullying and harassment, seeking to undermine transgender rights, and presiding over a "toxic culture." A few days later on 26 May, the investigation was suspended "following a backlash from 54 peers and outcry across the political spectrum," with the EHRC stating that they needed legal advice "on the impact of leaked confidential information." The investigation restarted in July 2023 but was closed in October 2023, following an review of the Commission's handling of complaints by outside legal experts, initiated by the Minister for Women and Equalities Kemi Badenoch, with Falkner remaining in her position as Chair until December 2025.

== See also ==
- Scottish Human Rights Commission
