= The Consortium of LGBT Voluntary and Community Organisations UK =

The Consortium of Lesbian Gay Bisexual and Transgender Voluntary and Community Organisations UK, known as the LGBT Consortium, is a national specialist membership organisation. They focus on the development and support of LGBT groups, organisations and projects so they can better deliver direct services and campaign for LGBT rights.

The organisation was founded in 1998, originally supporting lesbian, gay, and bisexual community organisations. In 2003 they expanded their scope to include transgender organisations.

== Supporting the LGBT third sector ==
Consortium’s work is focused on four key areas: Supporting members in delivering essential services, facilitating collaboration across networks, consulting and communicating with members, and securing funding to strengthen LGBT organisations and projects across the UK.

In 2018 the Minister for Women and Equalities, Penny Mordaunt, announced that the government would be forming an LGBT Advisor Panel. The panel would advise and provide evidence to the government about the experiences of LGBT people within the UK. Consortium was publicly announced to be on the panel alongside Stonewall and the LGBT Foundation.

Consortium began running grant schemes in 2019, and by 2025 they had distributed over £2.1 million to LGBT organisations. The organisation has presented research on why LGBT+ organisations face barriers when applying for funding, and what funders should be aware of when seeking LGBT+ applicants.
