= Sexual abuse =

Abusive sexual behavior

Sexual abuse or sex abuse is abusive sexual behavior by one person upon another. It is often perpetrated using physical force, or by taking advantage of another. It often consists of a persistent pattern of sexual assaults. The offender is referred to as a sexual abuser. Live streaming sexual abuse involves trafficking and coerced sexual acts, or rape, in real time on webcam.

Molestation refers to an instance of sexual assault, especially when perpetrated against a child. The perpetrator is called (often pejoratively) a molester. The term also covers physical behavior by an adult or older adolescent towards a child to sexually stimulate any of the involved. The use of a child for sexual stimulation is referred to as child sexual abuse and, for pubescent or post-pubescent individuals younger than the age of consent, statutory rape.

Sexual abuse can be perpetrated against other vulnerable populations like the elderly, a form of elder abuse, or those with developmental disabilities.

== Victims ==
=== Spouses ===
Spousal sexual abuse is a form of domestic violence. When the abuse involves threats of unwanted sexual contact or forced sex by a woman's husband or ex-husband, it may constitute rape, depending on the jurisdiction, and may also constitute an assault.

=== Children ===
Child sexual abuse is a form of child abuse in which a child is abused for the sexual gratification of an adult or older adolescent. It includes direct sexual contact, the adult or otherwise older person engaging indecent exposure (of the genitals, female nipples, etc.) to a child with intent to gratify their own sexual desires or to intimidate or groom the child, asking or pressuring a child to engage in sexual activities, displaying pornography to a child, or using a child to produce child pornography.

Effects of child sexual abuse include shame, self-blame, depression, anxiety, post-traumatic stress disorder, self-esteem issues, sexual dysfunction, chronic pelvic pain, addiction, self-injury, suicidal ideation, borderline personality disorder, and propensity to re-victimization in adulthood. Child sexual abuse is a risk factor for attempting suicide. Additionally, some studies have shown childhood sexual abuse to be a risk factor of the perpetration of intimate partner violence in men. Much of the harm caused to victims becomes apparent years after the abuse happens. With specific regard to addiction, a study by Reiger et al. supports previous findings that adverse life events increase sensitivity to drug rewards and bolster drug reward signaling by exposing an association between heightened limbic response to cocaine cues.

Sexual abuse by a family member is a form of incest, which can result in severe long-term psychological trauma, especially in the case of parental incest.

Globally, approximately 18–19% of women and 8% of men disclose being sexually abused during their childhood. The gender gap may be caused by higher victimization of girls, lower willingness of men to disclose abuse, or both. Most sexual abuse offenders are acquainted with their victims; approximately 30% are relatives of the child, most often fathers, uncles or cousins; around 60% are other acquaintances such as friends of the family, babysitters, or neighbors; strangers are the offenders in approximately 10% of child sexual abuse cases. Most child sexual abuse is committed by men; women commit approximately 14% of offenses reported against boys and 6% of offenses reported against girls. Child sexual abuse offenders are not pedophiles unless they have a primary or exclusive sexual interest in prepubescent children.

=== People with developmental disabilities ===
People with developmental disabilities are often victims of sexual abuse. According to research, people with disabilities are at a greater risk for victimization of sexual assault or sexual abuse because of lack of understanding (Sobsey & Varnhagen, 1989).

=== Elderly and people with dementia ===
Elderly people, especially those with dementia, can be at risk of abuse. There were over 6,000 "safeguarding concerns and alerts" at UK care homes from 2013 to 2015. These included alleged inappropriate touching and worse allegations. Offenders were most often other residents but staff also offended. It is suspected some care homes may deliberately overlook these offenses.

=== People in poverty ===
People in poverty, including those from developing countries, are vulnerable to forced prostitution, live streaming sexual abuse, and other forms of molestation. Victims who come from families in poverty often have less connections, power, protection, and education about sex crimes.

=== Minorities ===
Sexual abuse is a problem in some minority communities. In 2007, a number of Hispanic victims were included in the settlement of a massive sexual abuse case involving the Los Angeles archdiocese of the Catholic Church. A qualitative study by Kim et al. discusses the experiences of sexual abuse in the US population of Mexican immigrant women, citing immigration, acculturation, and several other social elements as risk factors for abuse.

=== Prisoners ===
The experience of forced strip searches can be experienced as a traumatic event similarly to that of rape, especially when combined with habitual body cavity searches. The prevalence of CCTV in modern correctional facilities and the generally indiscreet nature of strip searches, often with a number of prison guards observing, usually adds to the experienced humiliation. Strip searches are often arbitrarily used under various pretences, when the actual ambition is to assert control and predominance as well as to intimidate the subjected prison inmates.

=== Animals ===
Captive breeding activities are sometimes described as sexual abuse. People for the Ethical Treatment of Animals (PETA) has specifically objected, for example, to SeaWorld's breeding of orcas (Orcinus orca). Captive breeding of animals led to the idea of capturing and enslaving women for involuntary breeding according to Charles Patterson.

== Treatment ==
In the emergency department, contraceptive medications are offered to women raped by men because about 5% of such rapes result in pregnancy. Preventative medication against sexually transmitted infections are given to victims of all types of sexual abuse (especially for the most common diseases like chlamydia, gonorrhea, trichomoniasis and bacterial vaginosis) and a blood serum is collected to test for STIs (such as HIV, hepatitis B and syphilis). Any survivor with abrasions are immunized for tetanus if 5 years have elapsed since the last immunization. Short-term treatment with a benzodiazepine may help with acute anxiety and antidepressants may be helpful for symptoms of PTSD, depression and panic attacks.

Sexual abuse has been linked to the development of psychotic symptoms in abused children. Treatment for psychotic symptoms may also be involved in sexual abuse treatment.

In regards to long term psychological treatment, prolonged exposure therapy has been tested as a method of long-term PTSD treatment for victims of sexual abuse.

== Prevention ==
Child sexual abuse prevention programmes were developed in the United States of America during the 1970s and originally delivered to children. Programmes delivered to parents were developed in the 1980s and took the form of one-off meetings, two to three hours long. In the last 15 years, web-based programmes have been developed.

== Survivor ==
The term survivor is sometimes used for a living victim, including victims of non-fatal harm, to honor and empower the strength of an individual to heal, in particular a living victim of sexual abuse or assault. For example, there are the Survivors Network of those Abused by Priests and The Survivors Trust.

== Positions of power ==
Sexual misconduct can occur where one person uses a position of authority to compel another person to engage in an otherwise unwanted sexual activity. For example, sexual harassment in the workplace might involve an employee being coerced into a sexual situation out of fear of being dismissed. Sexual harassment in education might involve a student submitting to the sexual advances of a person in authority in fear of being punished, for example by being given a failing grade.

Several sexual abuse scandals have involved religious abuse or religious settings and often cover-up among non-abusers, including cases in the Southern Baptist Convention, Catholic Church, Episcopalian religion, Islam, Jehovah's Witnesses, Lutheran church, Methodist Church, Anabaptist/Mennonite Church, The Church of Jesus Christ of Latter-day Saints, the Fundamentalist Church of Jesus Christ of Latter Day Saints, Orthodox Judaism, other branches of Judaism, various buddhist schools such as Zen and Tibetan, Yoga classes, and various cults.

== Social media ==
Due to social media censorship algorithms, people wishing to discuss sex and particular sexual assault have adopted the 'algospeak' code word 'mascara' to refer to a boyfriend or romantic partner in a sexual context and then proceed to euphemistically describe bad experiences. The use of such code language can also lead to confusion and embarrassment for those who are unfamiliar with the intended meaning.

== Animals ==
Sexual abuse has been identified among animals as well, for example, among the Adélie penguins.

== See also ==
- Abuse
- Auguste Ambroise Tardieu
- Birth control sabotage
- Child grooming
- Cinderella effect
- Circles of Support and Accountability
- Deepfake pornography
- Domestic abuse
- Hebephilia
- Institutional abuse
- Journal of Sexual Aggression
- #MeToo
- Minor (law)
- Operation Protect Our Children
- Prevention Project Dunkelfeld
- Psychological manipulation
- Rape, Abuse & Incest National Network
- Sexual bullying
- Sexual violence
- Sex and the law
- Stalking
- Survivors Trust
- Victimology
- Virtuous Pedophiles (online support group for preventing sexual abuse)
- Impact of prostitution on mental health
