= Hbomberguy =

British YouTuber (born 1992)

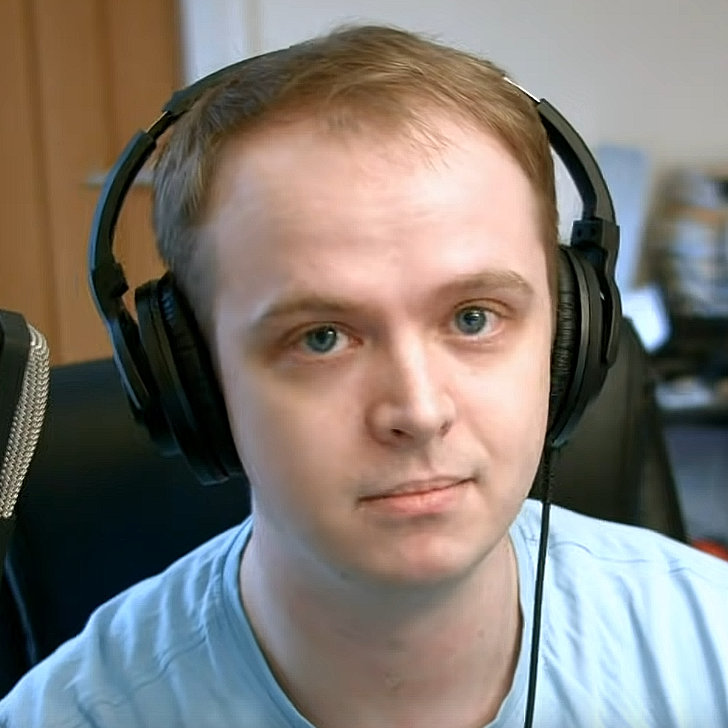
- Brewis in 2019
- Born: 19 September 1992 (age 34); Halifax, West Yorkshire, England
- Education: Aberystwyth University
- Occupations: YouTube personality; video essayist; Twitch streamer
- Years active: 2006–present

Twitch information
- Channel: Hbomberguy
- Years active: 2016–present
- Followers: 76.2 thousand

YouTube information
- Channel: hbomberguy
- Subscribers: 1.88 million (hbomberguy); 294 thousand (H.BurgerGuy)
- Views: 291 million (hbomberguy); 6.33 million (H.BurgerGuy)
- Last updated: 11 Oct 2026

Harry Brewis (Note: Brewis's first name is sometimes erroneously reported as "Harris". Brewis attributes this to his habit of jokingly referring to himself as "Harris Bomberguy" in his videos.) (born 19 September 1992), also known as Hbomberguy, is a British YouTuber and Twitch streamer. Brewis has produced video essays on a variety of topics such as film, television, and video games; often combining them with arguments from left-wing political and economic positions. He has created videos aimed at debunking conspiracy theories and responding to right-wing and antifeminist arguments.

== Early life ==
Harry Brewis was born on 19 September 1992 in Halifax, West Yorkshire, England. He studied English literature with a focus on creative writing at Aberystwyth University. Before focusing on his own YouTube channel full time, Brewis worked as an information technology engineer, then as an animator for The School of Life's YouTube channel.

== Content ==
Brewis started the Hbomberguy YouTube channel on 28 May 2006. As of June 2025, the channel has over 1.8 million subscribers. He also uploads his videos on the online streaming service Nebula.

Brewis's videos often take the format of short documentaries, with him talking directly to the camera on a particular topic interspersed with comedic sketches and gags. He consults with experts and fact-checkers for his videos to ensure their factual accuracy. Some of the most popular videos on his channel are his A Measured Response series, which features Brewis critiquing figures such as flat Earth conspiracy theorists, pickup artists, anti-vaxxers, and content creators who believe soy makes men feminine and use the term soy boy. Due to his videos debunking right-wing and alt-right ideas, Brewis has commonly been described as a part of BreadTube, an informal network of left-leaning YouTubers; however, he does not associate himself with the term. Like other YouTube channels under the BreadTube label, Brewis's political content mirrors the presentation of popular non-political content creators such as pop-culture essayists and gaming YouTubers.

Along with his political analysis and Measured Response series, Brewis has been producing long-form media reviews and video essays on a number of topics, such as television, film, internet culture and video games. During an interview in December 2020, Brewis said he has had a years-old video completely blocked and a video about the BBC Sherlock blocked in the UK by Content ID. Prior to its release, Brewis attempted to upload the video and found it automatically blocked by YouTube's Content ID system. Brewis opted to extensively re-edit the video to circumvent this automated detection. In an essay criticising the Content ID system, the Electronic Frontier Foundation highlighted Brewis's difficulty as an example of how they believed Content ID "undermines" the intent of fair use.

=== Mermaids charity stream ===
From 18 to 21 January 2019, Brewis continually livestreamed to raise money for British transgender charity organisation Mermaids. In this stream, he aimed to complete Donkey Kong 64 while finding all possible collectable items and did so in 57 hours and 48 minutes. Mermaids had been designated funding by the British National Lottery, but the funding was withheld and put under review after criticism by comedy writer and anti-transgender activist Graham Linehan and others. This inspired Brewis to stream in support of the charity.

The livestream featured many notable guests, including U.S. Representative Alexandria Ocasio-Cortez; activist and whistleblower Chelsea Manning; actress Mara Wilson; journalists Paris Lees and Owen Jones; Adam Ruins Everything creator Adam Conover; author Chuck Tingle; Matt Christman and Virgil Texas of the Chapo Trap House podcast; Donkey Kong 64 composer Grant Kirkhope; NFL athlete Chris Kluwe; game designers Rebecca Heineman, Josh Sawyer, John Romero and Scott Benson; YouTubers Natalie Wynn, Lindsay Ellis, Abigail Thorn and James Stephanie Sterling; as well as the then CEO of Mermaids, Susie Green. Colin Mochrie, Neil Gaiman, Cher, Matthew Mercer, Adam Savage, Hidetaka Suehiro and SonicFox tweeted in support of the livestream and the charity. The livestream began with a goal of US$500; it quickly passed that goal and several subsequent funding targets. In the first 24 hours, the livestream raised over $100,000. In total, over $347,000 (£265,000) was raised for the charity through the livestream, with over 659,000 people watching the stream.

The livestream garnered attention and praise. The Guardian called it "an antidote to the worst of gaming culture", and it was praised in a motion lodged in the Scottish Parliament by Green Party co-convenor Patrick Harvie. In July 2019, the LGBT magazine Attitude recognised the livestream by honoring Brewis with an Attitude Pride Award. Mermaids thanked Brewis for the livestream on their Twitter account.

=== "ROBLOX_OOF.mp3" ===
In November 2022, Brewis published "ROBLOX_OOF.mp3", a video essay which documented many of the high-profile claims that Tommy Tallarico had made concerning his career, including being the creator of the sound effect at the heart of his Roblox legal dispute, his Guinness World Records, and being the first American to work on the Sonic the Hedgehog franchise, and concluded many were either exaggerations or knowingly false.

=== "Plagiarism and You(Tube)" ===
On 2 December 2023, Brewis uploaded a nearly four-hour video essay titled "Plagiarism and You(Tube)", in which he discussed plagiarism and presented accusations and evidence of plagiarism against YouTubers Filip Miucin, Cinemassacre, iilluminaughtii, Internet Historian, and James Somerton. The second half of the video focuses exclusively on Somerton, whom Brewis accuses of expansive plagiarism, as well as appropriating content from various other queer writers and content creators. The Celluloid Closet, a 1996 film based on the book of the same name by Vito Russo, and Tinker Belles and Evil Queens, a 2000 book by Sean Griffin, were among the works Somerton was accused of plagiarizing, in part or in whole, across at least 26 of his videos.

In addition to the plagiarism accusations, another YouTuber, Todd in the Shadows, released a separate video soon after Brewis's where he fact-checked Somerton and debunked claims he made about queer culture and other topics.

In response, Somerton removed all of his videos from public view and deactivated his Twitter and Patreon accounts. He removed the website for his film studio, Telos, which was scrutinised by Brewis for raising funds without producing any films. Somerton released an apology video, which was widely criticised. In his video, Somerton said he would continue his career, and he re-opened his Patreon account without notifying his patrons. This raised concerns about individuals being charged without their knowledge. Somerton removed the apology video a few hours after it was uploaded and closed his Patreon a second time.

== Reception ==
Brewis has been praised by critics for his YouTube channel's format and commentary. His 2017 video on VHS, which was produced in collaboration with video essayist and podcaster Shannon Strucci, was praised by TenEighty Magazine as an excellent "deep-dive" into the topic. His video analysis of the Ctrl+Alt+Del comic "Loss" has received critical acclaim: it was selected by Polygon as one of the ten best video essays of 2018 and was nominated three times in the Sight & Sound collection of 2018's most outstanding videographic criticism, with British film critic and filmmaker Charlie Shackleton stating: "The reliably great H. Bomberguy pushed the YouTube video essay into new territory with this Matryoshka doll of an upload: a layered critique of the gaming webcomic Ctrl+Alt+Del, Tommy Wiseau's bad-taste classic The Room and the YouTube video essay itself. To cap it all off, it's a horror movie".

Brewis's Climate Denial: A Measured Response was nominated for Sight & Sound's 2019 list of the best video essays of the year, with Strucci saying: "this is the hardest I have ever laughed at any video essay ... and the humor and energy Harris brings to his work without sacrificing sincerity or depth of research is, as far as I am concerned, unparalleled".

== Personal life ==
Brewis is bisexual and an atheist. He is a socialist and supported Jeremy Corbyn in the 2017 United Kingdom general election. In an interview with SmoshAlike from February 2026, Brewis said he had been residing in the United States for a year and a half after traveling to film a video, and was informed by his lawyer that, if he were to leave the United States, "they might not let me back in."
