= Safer Living Foundation =

UK charity focused on reducing sexual offending and reoffending

- Formation: 13 February 2014
- Registration no.: 1155788
- Legal status: Charitable Incorporated Organisation
- Location: Nottingham Trent University, United Kingdom
- Region served: Derby; Derbyshire; Leicester; Leicestershire; Lincolnshire; Nottingham; Nottinghamshire
- Trustees: Lynn Saunders OBE (Chair); Claire Hampson (Vice Chair); Kerensa Hocken (Clinical Lead); Geraldine Akerman; Nicholas Blagden; Karin Spenser; Kirsty Teague
- Affiliations: Nottingham Trent University; HMP Whatton
- Budget: £327,050
- Staff: 5 full-time 4 part-time
- Volunteers: 137
- Website: www.saferlivingfoundation.org

The Safer Living Foundation (SLF) is a British charity focused on reducing sexual offending and reoffending through rehabilitative and preventative initiatives. It operates in Derby, Derbyshire, Leicester, Leicestershire, Lincolnshire, Nottingham and Nottinghamshire.

== History ==
The SLF was founded in February 2014 by senior members of HMP Whatton and psychologists from Nottingham Trent University. The organisation's charitable objects are:

- To promote for the benefit of the public the protection of people from, and the prevention of, sexual crime.
- To promote for the public benefit the rehabilitation of persons who have committed or are likely to commit offences, particularly sexual offences against others.

The organisation was founded to support people with sexual convictions using the Circles of Support and Accountability (CoSA) model, with a particular focus on supporting those who were particularly vulnerable due to being elderly or having an intellectual disability. It was the first organisation in UK to use this model to start supporting services users (referred to as "core members") before their release from prison. This was to allow core members to develop a relationship with their volunteers, with the intention that they would feel more supported as they leave prison and return to society.

== Projects ==
By 2016 the SLF was planning two new projects in addition to the existing CoSA project. These were a young people's CoSA and a prevention project for people with a sexual interest in children or other unhelpful paraphilias.

The prevention project commenced in 2018, providing support to anyone experiencing "sexual thoughts that if acted on would result in a sexual offence". This project uses treatment approaches from "third wave" cognitive behavioural therapy, in particular acceptance and commitment therapy and compassion-focused therapy.

The young people's CoSA was designed to work with young people aged 10-21 years who had committed a sexual offense. This project was created in response to research by Simon Hackett which showed a large proportion of sexual crimes reported against children were committed by other young people.

The SLF's website lists the following projects:

- Adult projects
  - The Prevention Project (Aurora)
  - The Corbett Centre
  - Circles of Support and Mentoring
- Research projects
  - Release Project - exploring the expectations, attitudes and beliefs of long term prisoners regarding their upcoming and eventual release
  - Accommodation Project - aimed at providing better accommodation prospects to prisoners who are leaving prison and reintegrating back into the community

In 2020 Her Majesty's Chief Inspector of Prisons reported that Circles of Support and Accountability and HMP Whatton Support and Mentoring "were doing valuable work to prepare prisoners for and support them after release".

== The Corbett Centre for Prisoner Reintegration ==
On 11 February 2019 the SLF opened the Corbett Centre for Prisoner Reintegration in the centre of Nottingham with the aim of reducing reoffending by supporting ex-prisoners to reintegrate into society. This support includes life skills such as decorating, gardening and cooking, practical help for employment and education, and emotional support such as mindfulness and meditation. The centre is funded by sources including Nottingham Trent University, Nottinghamshire Police and Crime Commissioner, and the Department for Health and Social Care. It is the first of its kind in the UK.

Paddy Tipping (Nottinghamshire Police and Crime Commissioner) said of the centre "If we can rehabilitate offenders and support them as they return to live in the community, they will be safer and less likely to reoffend. This in turn means there will be fewer victims of sexual abuse and harm."

The centre has been met with criticism from local sexual abuse survivors groups who described the opening of the centre as "a slap in the face" and felt that "it says that the offender is more important than the victim", whilst also stating that they "support anything that can be done to rehabilitate sex offenders".

The centre is named after Lord Robin Corbett, and Lady Val Corbett, owing to Lord Corbett's lifelong interest in prisoners 'learning through doing'. It is a joint venture with The Corbett Network.

== Research and publications ==
The SLF has presented posters at the ATSA Conference 2018 and 2019, and hosts an annual Prevention conference through Nottingham Trent University's SOCAMRU (Sexual Offences, Crime and Misconduct Research Unit) with speakers from across the UK.

Trustees have published academic papers on the work of the SLF and books on understanding sexual offending and prevention.

== Media ==
The work of the SLF as an organisation and of individual trustees has been profiled in national media including The Guardian, Sky News, File on 4, BBC Woman's Hour, and the BBC Three documentary Can Sex Offenders Change?.

== Achievements ==
The organisation, trustees and volunteers have received recognition including:

- Third Sector Charity of the Year 19
- The Guardian Public Service Leadership Excellence Award 2018 (Lynn Saunders, SLF Chair)
- OBE (Lynn Saunders)
- The Guardian University Awards 2016 (social and community impact category – Nottingham Trent University for their work with the SLF)
- Butler Trust Award 2015-2016 (Kerensa Hocken, SLF founder and trustee)
- The Robin Corbett Award 2015

The organisation also received commendations in the Howard League for Penal Reform Community Awards 2018 and 2019 (The Aurora Project), and former SLF volunteer Stuart Roderick received a commendation in the Butler Trust Awards 2018-2019.

== See also ==
- Association for Contextual Behavioral Science
- Circles of Support and Accountability
- The Good Lives Model
- Prevention Project Dunkelfeld

== Bibliography ==
- Hayes, Stephen C.; Strosahl, Kirk D.; Wilson, Kelly G. (28 September 2011). Acceptance and Commitment Therapy (2nd ed.). Guilford Press. ISBN 9781462528943.
- Gilbert, Paul (2010). The Compassionate Mind: A New Approach to Life's Challenges. New Harbinger Publications. ISBN 1572248408.
- Hayes, Louise L.; Ciarrochi, Joseph V. (1 November 2015). The Thriving Adolescent: Using Acceptance and Commitment Therapy and Positive Psychology to Help Teens Manage Emotions, Achieve Goals, and Build Connection. New Harbinger Publications. ISBN 9781608828029.
