= Robin Wilson =

Robin Wilson may refer to:

- R. N. D. Wilson (1899–1953), Irish poet
- Robin Wilson (author) (1928–2013), American science fiction writer
- Robin Wilson (mathematician) (born 1943), head of pure mathematics at the Open University, UK
- Robin Wilson (field hockey) (born 1957), New Zealand field hockey player
- Robin Wilson (musician) (born 1965), American singer and guitarist, lead vocalist of the Gin Blossoms
- Robin Wilson (singer), singer and actress active in the late 1960s and mid 1970s
- Robin Wilson (eco-designer) (born 1969), eco-friendly lifestyle expert
- Robin Wilson (curler), Canadian curler
- Robin Wilson (psychologist), Canadian psychologist
- Robin Lee Wilson (1933–2019), British civil engineer
- R. McL. Wilson (Robert McLachlan Wilson, commonly known as Robin Wilson, 1916–2010), Scottish biblical scholar and translator
