= B4U-ACT =

American anti-sexual abuse organization

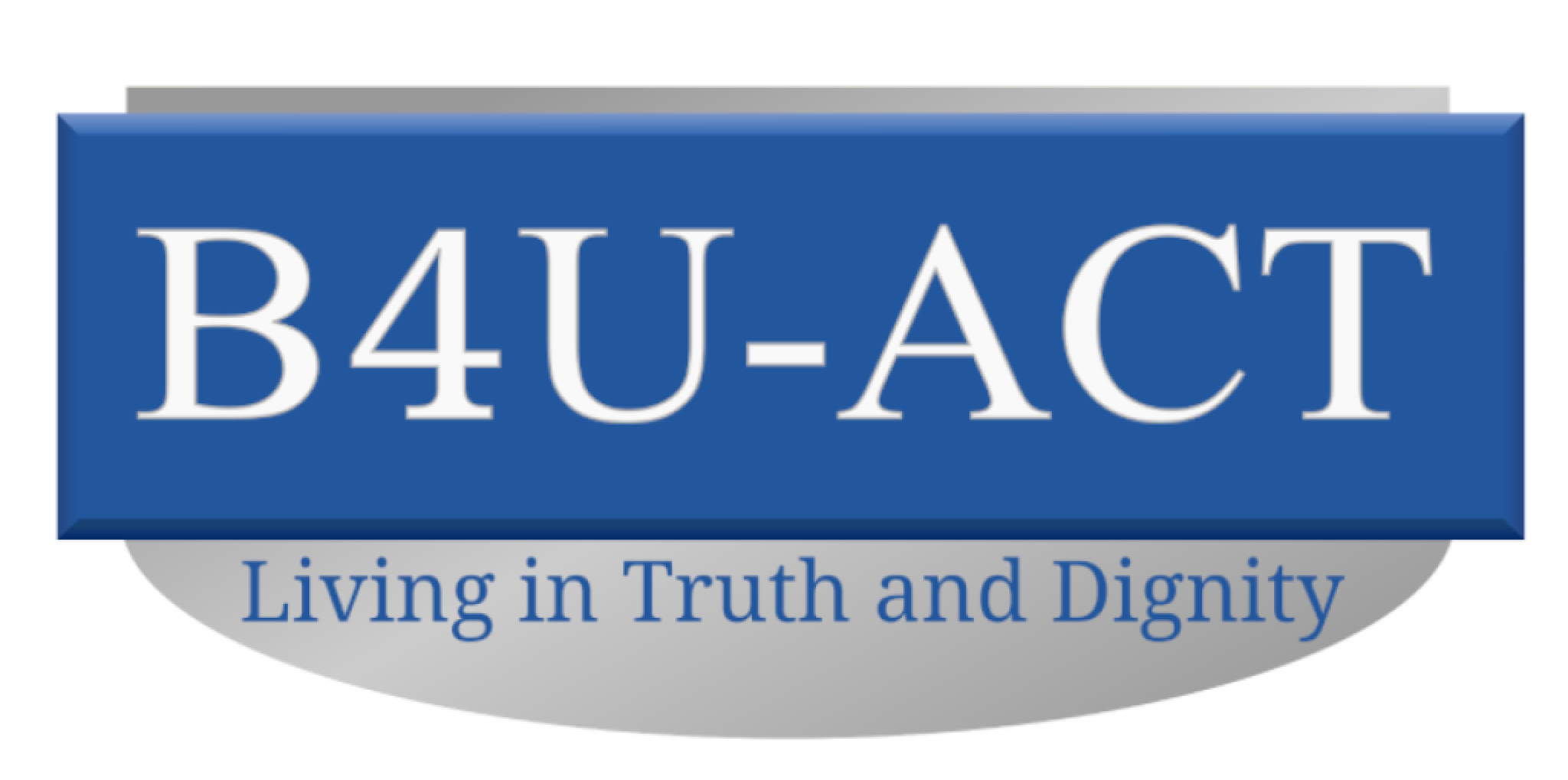
- Formation: 2003
- Founder: Michael Melsheimer, Russell Dick
- Legal status: Nonprofit organization
- Headquarters: Baltimore
- Location: Westminster, Maryland, United States
- Board of directors: Russell A. Dick
- Publication: B4U-ACT Quarterly Review
- Expenses: $7,000 (in 2008)
- Website: https://www.b4uact.org/

B4U-ACT (lit. 'Before you act') is an American 501(c)(3) nonprofit organization headquartered in Baltimore that works to prevent child sexual abuse by providing resources and treatment for pedophiles.

== Background ==
B4U-ACT was founded in 2003 by Russell Dick and Michael Melsheimer. Melsheimer was a former YMCA director that served four years in a federal prison for aggravated sexual assault involving children and Dick a former director of social work of the Springfield Hospital Center.

B4U-ACT claims their aim is to provide mental health resources and conduct research. Since 2021, the organization has published a quarterly journal collecting reviews of their current research.

As of 2008, the organization had approximately 25 members.

During the development of the fifth edition of the Diagnostic and Statistical Manual of Mental Disorders (DSM-5), B4U-ACT criticized the proposal of the American Psychiatric Association's Sexual and Gender Identity Disorders Work Group regarding the inclusion of hebephilia as a subtype of pedophilia in the DSM-5.

In October 2022, Jacob Breslow, a member of the transgender charity group Mermaids resigned from office after it was reported that he had spoken at a 2011 event organized by B4U-ACT.

== See also ==
- Virtuous Pedophiles
