= Bobbi Pickard =

British human rights campaigner and activist

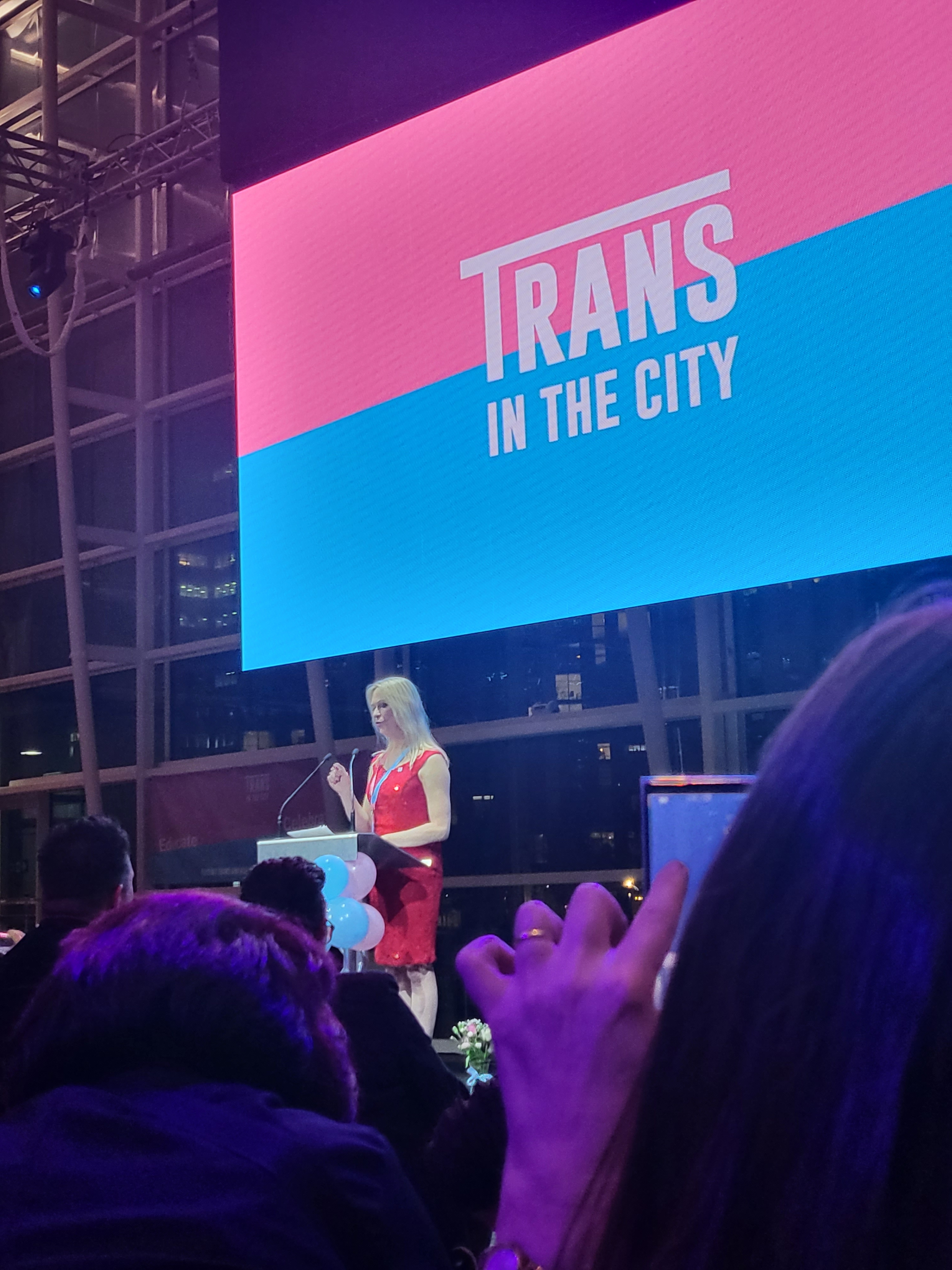
Bobbi Pickard speaking at the Trans in the City Awards 2022

Bobbi Pickard (born January 1969) is a British human rights and LGBTQIA+ rights campaigner, and founder of Trans in the City. She was one of the first openly transgender employees at BP, and runs a diversity, equity, and inclusion consultancy firm.

== Life ==
Bobbi Pickard was born in January 1969, and grew up struggling with gender dysphoria from the age three. She was open with her gender identity until aged six, when her father told her that boys didn't wear dresses or play with dolls. Growing up, she struggled to hide her identity, becoming isolated at school. The emotional toll of hiding her true self culminated in a suicide attempt at age 14, when puberty intensified her gender dysphoria. She first shared her gender identity with a select group of people in 1991. Over two decades later, in 2015, she was able to medically transition, before publicly coming out in her workplace at BP in 2017.

Pickard has previously worked for British Aerospace, Kodak, and Computer Weekly, among others, before becoming self-employed and starting her own business in the early 2000s. Later, she began working at BP.

She became the Co-Chair of BP Pride's Transgender Group. Trans in the City was founded by Pickard in 2017, as a UK based not-for-profit organisation championing equality for trans and non-binary people in business. Pickard is the organisation's CEO.

In 2021, she became the first openly trans person to close the London Stock Exchange, is a patron of the LGBTQIA+ parents charity FFLAG, and a Golden champion of the LGBTQIA+ homelessness charity Stonewall Housing. In the past she has been a trustee for Mermaids and an ambassador for MindOut. She has raised several hundred thousand pounds for trans charities since 2016.

In 2025, she became a patron of Swindon and Wiltshire Pride, and joined the panel of judges for the British LGBT Awards.

Through her consultancy work, Bobbi has spoken at a variety of events, teaching businesses and workplaces how they can be supportive of their transgender and non-binary employees.

== Accolades and awards ==
In 2019, Pickard was included in PwC's Stonewall 50 Inspirational Role Models List, was #1 in the Yahoo Finance OUTstanding 50 LGBT+ Future Leaders’ List and received the Rainbow Honours LGBTQ Champion Award.

In 2020, Pickard became British LGBT Awards Nestle Diversity Champion, placed #4 in the Yahoo Finance OUTstanding 50 LGBT+ Future Leaders’ List and #14 in the Pride Power List.

In 2021, Pickard was named Diversity Hero at the European Diversity Awards, and placed #12 in the Pride Power List.

Pickard was named Stonewall Changemaker of the Year in 2022.

In 2025, she was included as a role model on Diva Magazine's DIVA Power List, their yearly celebration of LGBTQ+ women and non-binary people.
