= HM Prison Whatton =

Prison in Nottinghamshire, England

Coordinates: 52°56′50″N 0°54′42″W

HMP Whatton
- Interactive map of HMP Whatton
- Location: Whatton, Nottinghamshire
- Security class: Adult Male/Category C
- Capacity: 801 as of June 2022
- Opened: 1966
- Managed by: HM Prison Services
- Governor: Caroline Vine
- Website: Whatton at justice.gov.uk

HM Prison Whatton is a Category C men's prison, located in the village of Whatton, near Bingham in Nottinghamshire, England. The prison is operated by His Majesty's Prison Service, and houses males convicted of sexual offences.

== Prison structure and population ==
HMP Whatton first opened as a detention centre for boys under 18 in 1966. Since May 1990, it has held people with convictions for sexual offences who are willing to participate in treatment programmes. The prison has an operational capacity of 801, with three accommodation blocks (A wing, B wing, and C wing). Majority of cells on A and C wing are double cells with B wing also having a small amount of doubles with rest being made up of single cells. Over 90% of prisoners at Whatton are serving sentences of more than four years, and two-thirds are aged over 40.

The eligibility for entry to HMP Whatton are that prisoners should (a) be at security category C, (b) have at least six months of their sentence left to serve, and (c) not require the services of a full-time MO. People should also not be maintaining their innocence with regard to their offences. Preference is given to people who are assessed as being suitable for the treatment programmes available at the prison.

The current Governor of the prison is Caroline Vine, with the Independent Monitoring Board being chaired by Jan Pavier.

== Prison activities ==
The therapeutic focus of HMP Whatton contributes to a prison climate that is geared around preparing prisoners for their lives after release. The prison runs a suite of accredited offending behaviour programmes, including Kaizen and Horizon, and adapted programmes for people with intellectual disabilities (Becoming New Me and New Me Coping). Whatton is also the only prison in the UK running a programme for deaf prisoners using British Sign Language. All prisoners are screened for signs of autism on entry to the prison, meaning that courses can be adapted to those with additional needs or requiring alternative approaches.

In terms of educational and vocational training, opportunities for training are embedded in all prison activities. This is particularly the case in relation to literacy and mathematics skills, with these being embedded into treatment programmes and educational programmes across the prison. There are a range of employment activities and vocational skills training courses, opportunities for prisoners to engage in distance learning such as the Open University, and a range of services for older prisoners in conjunction with Age UK. The prison also has palliative care and dementia care facilities. Whatton has won a number of gardening and Wildlife awards (Windlesham Trophy) and prisoners are actively involved in improving and developing the environment.

The prison established an anti-libidinal medication project in 2009 to support prisoners wishing to manage their sexual pre-occupation. This project has now been extended to five other prisons (Hull, Frankland, North Sea Camp, Leyhill, and Isle of Wight).

== Prison reports ==
As with all custodial establishments, HMP Whatton is subject to checks being conducted by HM Inspectorate of Prisons. In its most recent report (published 4 January 2017), HM Inspectorate of Probation (HMIP) commended the prison on its excellent regime and outcomes, in particular in relation to its education and training work. HMIP found HMP Whatton to be “overwhelmingly safe”, and despite incidents of prisoner self-harm increasing in the period leading up to the inspection (a trend that is consistent with many other HMP establishments, care for those in acute mental health difficulties was consistently good.

The one area of concern expressed by HMIP was that prisoner complaints in relation to race relations. While prisoner-staff relations were generally considered to be very good (the same report stated that some of the equality work being undertaken at HMP Whatton was “groundbreaking”), and, according to the 2016 report of the prison's Independent Monitoring Board, the small number of transgender prisoners resident in the prison reported feeling safe, this very specific issue around racial respect was something that HMIP requested urgent and immediate action on.

In relation to the 13 recommendations made by HMIP in 2012, the prison was found to have at least partially achieved 10. A key recommendation that was not achieved in this timeframe (and therefore which carried over into the most recent list of recommendations) was to monitor and evaluate the effectiveness of resettlement services offered by the prison. While HMP Whatton is not officially a designated resettlement prison, a recent link has been formed with the Lincolnshire Action Trust, who are a charity who work with prisons to prepare and support prisoners during the resettlement process.

Similarly, the education inspectorate Ofsted stated in its most recent report on HMP Whatton that the prison's provision in relation to learning and skills development was outstanding, the first for a closed male prison establishment. This report is testament to the therapeutic drive of many of the members of staff working at HMP Whatton. Specifically in relation to skills development, the prison's IMB were particularly impressed with the motivation of prisoners to engage in purposeful activity, and in relation to the standard of some of the outputs achieved through activity completed in various workshops.

Whatton was awarded the Deaf Aware Charter mark accreditation in March 2017 by the Royal Institute for the Deaf, and the Prison is working towards the National Autistic Society, autism awareness accreditation in November 2017.

== Relationship with Nottingham Trent University ==
HMP Whatton has close ties to the Sexual Offences, Crime and Misconduct Research Unit (SOCAMRU) of Nottingham Trent University (NTU). As part of this relationship, the prison benefits from dedicated research being conducted by academics with an expertise in the treatment and prevention of sexual offending, while university researchers gain the ability to conduct applied research and provide hands-on training to students enrolled on NTU courses.

The collaboration between HMP Whatton and Nottingham Trent University led to the establishment of the Safer Living Foundation (SLF) charity. The SLF aims to prevent (and protect the public from) sexual crime and promote the rehabilitation of persons who have committed or are likely to commit offences, particularly sexual offences against others. The SLF was the first organisation in UK to use the Circles of Support and Accountability model to start supporting services users before their release from prison, for which the charity received the Robin Corbett Award 2015.

Staff associated with the collaboration between the prison and SLF have also been public figures in promoting evidence-based treatments and policy approaches to reducing sexual crime, including former HMP Whatton's governor, Lynn Saunders, being featured by The Times newspaper in 2015
