= Butterfly (2018 TV series) =

British miniseries

- Genre: Drama
- Created by: Tony Marchant
- Written by: Tony Marchant
- Directed by: Anthony Byrne
- Starring: Anna Friel; Emmett J. Scanlan; Callum Booth-Ford; Seán McGinley; Millie Gibson; Lorraine Burroughs; Amy Huberman; Alison Steadman
- Composers: Michael Stein; Kyle Dixon
- Country of origin: United Kingdom
- Original language: English
- No. of series: 1
- No. of episodes: 3

Production
- Executive producers: Tony Marchant; Nicola Shindler; Adam Kemp; Caroline Hollick
- Producer: Louise Sutton
- Cinematography: Si Bell
- Editor: Josh Cunliffe
- Running time: 44 minutes
- Production company: Red Production Company

Original release
- Network: ITV
- Release: 14 October – 28 October 2018

Butterfly is a three-part British television drama series that premiered on 14 October 2018. Made for ITV by Red Production Company, the series focuses on the family of 11-year-old Maxine (Callum Booth-Ford), who begins to realise that she is a transgender girl. Anna Friel and Emmett J. Scanlan play her parents, Vicky and Stephen, who reluctantly begin to accept Maxine's need to transition. The programme was also broadcast in France, Germany, Italy, Spain and Sweden, and made available on the American subscription service Hulu.

The series was created by Tony Marchant, who met transgender people and their families during the writing process through trans charity Mermaids. Critical reception was very positive, with reviewers praising the actors and scenes that they found particularly emotive. Further praise was given to the subject matter of the story, though this also received some criticism. The miniseries was well received by social media users and several trans commentators, the first episode garnering 2.8 million overnight viewers. A scene in which Maxine attempts suicide was criticised by a gender clinic of the National Health Service.

== Production ==
The programme was created and written by Tony Marchant, who had previously written Different for Girls, a 1996 film about an adult trans woman. In 1999, he worked on family-related programmes Kid in the Corner, about ADHD, and Bad Blood, about adoption. In an interview with HuffPost, Marchant said that an idea which he found appealing was "the fluidity of gender". The series' lead consultant was Susie Green, UK director of the charity Mermaids, which supports transgender youth. The storyline has similarities to Green's experiences with her transgender daughter Jackie, who in 2010 became the youngest British girl to receive sex reassignment surgery at age 16.

Whilst writing the series, Marchant was able to visit families who Mermaids support and listen to their experiences. Marchant aimed to dispel two myths about transgender children: that they identify as such to be "trendy", and that puberty blockers are easy for trans people to access. Digital Spy reported that filming began in January 2018 and OK! reported that filming concluded in March 2018. Callum Booth-Ford, a cisgender boy, was cast as Maxine; around five actors were auditioned for the part. Marchant considered casting a trans child, but was told by Mermaids that it would be "really difficult and painful" for a trans actor. Green added that anonymity was a factor.

ITV announced the miniseries in September 2017, along with the casting of Anna Friel of Maxine's mother Vicky. Emmett J. Scanlan was cast as Stephen, Maxine's father. Scanlan read all three episodes' scripts in one sitting, finding it "so relevant and so well-written". He aimed to treat the subject with the "utmost honesty and care". Though saying she had little knowledge of transgender people prior to the project, Friel hoped to change public perception of transgender children, comparing it to her 1990s role on the soap opera Brookside where her character kissed another woman. Friel's daughter was aged thirteen during Butterfly's production.

Marchant noted a common theme among families at Mermaids was the presence of transgender children's mothers and absence of their fathers. Vicky's attitudes were written to be representative of her generation and Stephen's doubts were written to be reasonable and relatable. As research before filming began, Scanlan and Friel visited families that Mermaids work with. During filming, Friel listened to synth-pop and wore a specific perfume to get into the mindset of her character.

The soundtrack, which consists of synth music, was composed by Michael Stein and Kyle Dixon, who previously worked together on Netflix's science fiction-horror series Stranger Things. It was released upon the miniseries' broadcast in America on the subscription service Hulu.

== Cast ==
- Callum Booth-Ford as Maxine Duffy, birth name Max. Maxine is a trans girl who has wanted to wear girls' clothing since age five. Dysphoria with her body leads her to self-harm at age 11, and she wants to stop her body developing into a male one.
- Anna Friel as Vicky Duffy, Maxine's mother and guardian. Vicky has allowed Maxine to wear female clothing in the household but not in public; after consultation with professionals, she fully embraces Maxine's gender identity and works towards getting her treatment.
- Emmett J. Scanlan as Stephen Duffy, Maxine's father. Stephen left the household after slapping Maxine for acting feminine in a moment of anger and he is reluctant to accept Maxine's identity. He returns home and is eventually able to support her.
- Millie Gibson as Lily Duffy, Maxine's sister. Lily watches out for Maxine at school and encourages her to begin identifying as female. As her parents begin to pay more attention to Maxine, Lily begins to feel unloved. She is romantically interested in a school friend.
- Alison Steadman as Barbara Pannell, Vicky's mother. She is initially critical of Vicky for allowing Maxine to identify as female, but later supports it.
- Seán McGinley as Peter Duffy, Stephen's father. At first, he is concerned with Maxine's female gender identity.

== Episodes ==
| No. | Title | Original release date |
|---|---|---|
| 1 | "Episode 1" | 14 October 2018 |
Stephen brings his girlfriend Gemma when he spends the day with his children Lily and Max, the latter of whom wants to be treated as a girl despite having been assigned male at birth. On Max's first day at secondary school, resigned to wearing the male uniform, Max wets herself after refusing to use the male toilets. Lily helps her mother Vicky dress for a date, but Max urges her to start dating Stephen again. As Vicky is about to leave, Lily discovers Max has slashed her wrists. In the hospital, Max urges Stephen to return home. Talking to a mental health professional, Vicky and Stephen explain that Max has wished to wear girls' clothing from the age of five; the doctor recommends them to Ferrybank, a gender identity service. Vicky reluctantly allows Stephen to return home when he says he wants to "fix" their "son". Stephen breaks up with Gemma. A flashback shows Max being slapped by Stephen. Max discovers a video about trans people online. After dancing with Lily and her friends, Max is confronted by bullies, but Lily intervenes. At home, Lily announces that Max has bought a girl's uniform and wants to be known as Maxine.
| 2 | "Episode 2" | 21 October 2018 |
Vicky and Stephen go to a meeting at Mermaids – a transgender charity. Maxine tells Stephen about being bullied, so Stephen threatens the bullies with violence, to Vicky's outrage. After Maxine spends half an hour in the bathroom, Stephen forces the door open and the family see her holding a piece of broken glass, yelling in distress about having a penis. Maxine and her parents meet with a school staff member who, after issuing heavy warnings to Maxine about the permanence of identifying as female, sends a letter to the year group about her name change. At school, Maxine meets a girl Molly who has also been self-harming. Vicky's mother Barbara yells at her for letting Maxine present as a girl. After half-term Maxine dresses up with makeup, tights, nail polish and her hair in a French braid for the first time. Maxine sees a Ferrybank worker, as her parents do the same. Stephen also discusses the situation with Gemma. Maxine is denied puberty blockers, leading Vicky to shout at Ferrybank staff. She borrows money from Barbara so that she can take Maxine to Boston, United States, to obtain puberty blockers. Meanwhile, Lily goes on a date with a school friend.
| 3 | "Episode 3" | 28 October 2018 |
Stephen realises where Vicky and Maxine have gone and Barbara is outraged, as Vicky told her the money was for her business. Vicky pays for Maxine to go through medical tests to prepare for puberty blockers. She will need to return to Boston, United States, for further treatment. Meanwhile, Lily tells Stephen that she feels neglected and goes to stay with Barbara. Stephen pursues a criminal case against Vicky for parental child abduction; as they return home, Vicky is arrested and police officers interview Maxine. The family argue and Stephen leaves to stay with his father Peter. Following Gemma's advice, Stephen drops the legal case, but still argues with Vicky. An interim care order is filed and an officer assesses Maxine's well-being. When Vicky apologises to Barbara, she learns that Barbara spoke favourably of her to the officer. Maxine visits a hospitalised Molly. Vicky gets angry at the officer and admits that Stephen has slapped Maxine. Vicky apologises to Lily for neglecting her. Gemma meets Vicky. Later, Vicky and Stephen reluctantly explain to Maxine that she cannot return to Boston. After discussion with the care officer, the family go to an appointment and manage to get the go-ahead for Maxine to start puberty blockers.

== Broadcast ==
The programme first aired on the free channel ITV in the UK, on Sunday evenings in the prime time slot of 9 p.m. It began on 14 October 2018 and concluded on 28 October. The American subscription service Hulu released the series in January 2019. In Italy, the series was broadcast on the paid channel Fox Life in December 2018 on Mondays at 9 p.m., after premiering at a film festival in Milan. In Sweden, it was shown in January 2019 by public broadcaster Sveriges Television. The programme aired in February 2019 in France, under the title De Max à Maxine (From Max to Maxine). It premiered on the M6-owned paid channel DTT before airing on the free channel 6ter. The same month, Butterfly was played at a cinema and appeared on the channel EITB in the Basque Country in Spain. It commemorated the one-year anniversary of transgender teenager Ekai Lersundi's suicide. Under the title Butterfly – Alle Meine Farben (Butterfly – All My Colours), the miniseries aired in Germany on the paid channel RTL Passion in January 2020, in the slot of Tuesday 8:15 p.m.

== Reception ==
The first episode received an overnight rating of 2.8 million viewers. The three episodes overall garnered an average of 2.5 million viewers. Following the broadcast, Green reported that Mermaids had seen a spike in new members.

Reaction to the miniseries by the transgender community and the public was largely positive. In Radio Times, Ash Palmisciano – the first transgender actor on the British soap Emmerdale – praised Butterfly as "a landmark story", describing it as "truthful, dark, heart-breaking [and] beautiful". The article contains praise from other trans commentators and activists who found the programme to present accurate and positive portrayals of trans people, whilst also displaying the difficulties of transitioning. Woman & Home, Digital Spy, OK! and PinkNews reported that it was well received by viewers on social media, including by trans newsreader India Willoughby and Labour politician Dawn Butler. One woman interviewed by the Manchester Evening News described having a very similar situation to that of the programme's characters and said that the story "really hit home". However, some parents of transgender youth questioned whether Maxine was a gay boy who did not need to transition.

The National Health Service's gender clinic, the Gender Identity Development Service, criticised the series' depiction of Maxine's suicide attempt, stating that it was "not helpful" due to the rarity of 11-year-olds attempting suicide, and reporting that fewer than one per cent of their patients attempted suicide. Green cited a 2016 Stonewall survey in which 45 percent of transgender children reported that they had attempted suicide. ITV commented that "Butterfly is one family's fictional story". The Sunday Times reported that "programme-makers visited the clinic early on but it is understood they parted company over differences".

=== Critical reception ===
Butterfly received very positive critical reception. The Independent gave the series four out of five stars, with the first episode receiving four stars in The Guardian and three in The Telegraph and The Times, and the next two episodes receiving four and three stars in The Times, respectively. It was widely praised for its subject matter and described as groundbreaking, emotional to watch and engaging. The writing was found to be nuanced.

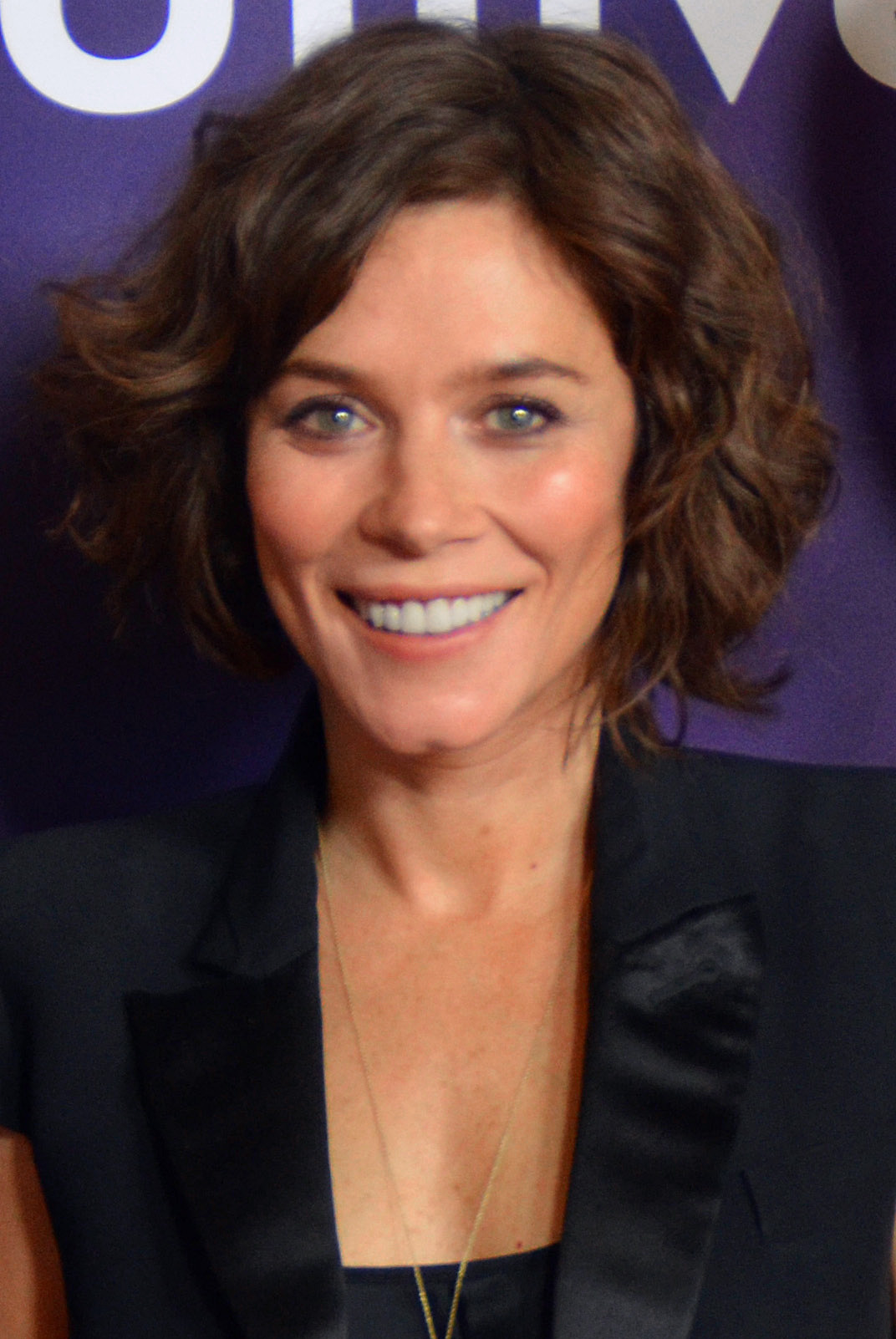
Anna Friel received praise in her role as Maxine's mother Vicky.

The acting and characterisation was lauded by critics, with Lucy Mangan of The Guardian describing the characters as "fully realised" by "uniformly brilliant performances". Booth-Ford's acting as Maxine was praised by Euan Ferguson of The Observer, Sean O'Grady of The Independent and Carol Midgley of The Times, with Samantha Allen of The Daily Beast saying that he brought "believable vulnerability" to the character. The parents were praised by James Jackson of The Times as relatable. They were further praised by Midgley, who called Friel's acting "realistic" and found that Scanlan "plays a difficult role beautifully". Steadman's role of Barbara received mixed reception, Ferguson calling her cynical nature "superb" but Gabriel Tate of The Telegraph finding her character "phoned in".

The depiction of transgender issues received widespread praise. Allen found it "informative" for audience members "who have only encountered transgender children in news articles". Jack Seale of The Guardian found it "unflinching" in its depiction of trauma caused by gender dysphoria, whilst Allen reviewed that a scene in which Vicky cries and wonders if she was responsible for Maxine's gender identity is "as moving as it is revealing of a specific anxiety". O'Grady highlights for praise a scene in which Lily says to Maxine: "I think of you as my sister".

However, the subject matter also received limited negative reception. A negative review in The Telegraph by Allison Pearson criticised the programme as "highly irresponsible" for displaying Maxine's suicide attempt. Also in The Telegraph, Tim Stanley critiqued the programme's depiction of manhood, commenting that "our culture doesn't value manly men quite the way it did". Gabriel Tate called the series "carefully calibrated pushback against lazy prejudice" but nonetheless criticised its use of clichés and negatively compared parts of it to a public information film.
