= The Survivors Trust =

Charity in the UK and Ireland

- Formation: 1999
- Legal status: Registered charity
- Purpose: Umbrella agency for agencies providing support for survivors of sexual abuse.
- CEO: Fay Maxted
- Website: thesurvivorstrust.org

The Survivors Trust is an anti-sexual abuse national umbrella agency for over 125 specialist voluntary sector agencies throughout the UK and Ireland providing a range of counselling, therapeutic and support services working with survivors of rape and other forms of sexual violence. The organisation aims to offer a national collective voice to support and empower survivor groups, to educate and inform acknowledgment of and response to sexual abuse on a local and national level.

== About ==
The Survivors Trust originated in 1999 or 2000, when key individuals within five specialist support agencies began to actively seek a peer group.

The Survivors Trust became a registered charity in 2005 and since then has continued to develop new partnerships and to work at a national level. As at 2008, The Survivors Trust has over 120 member groups.

As a charitable organisation The Survivors Trust has received funding from the Victims Fund and the UK Government to carry out its work, among other sources. The UK Government Home Office has also recognised The Survivors Trust as one of the main umbrella groups which provides support to the sexual violence and abuse voluntary sector in the UK and representatives from The Survivors Trust sit on the Stakeholder Advisory Group on Sexual Violence and Abuse, an advisory group to the UK Government.

== Core aims ==
The main aims of The Survivors Trust are to support and empower survivors of sexual violence, such as rape, sexual assault, and childhood sexual abuse. It does so by:

- Providing a collective voice and peer networking for members;
- Raising awareness about sexual abuse and/or rape and its effects on survivors, their supporters and society at large;
- Informing acknowledgement of, and effective responses to, rape and sexual abuse on a local, regional and national level.
