= Roblox oof =

Video game sound effect

Roblox death sound effect

The Roblox oof is a sound effect that plays when a player dies or resets in the online video game platform Roblox. It originated from the 2000 video game Messiah and was later adopted by Roblox as the platform's default death sound. The sound would later become an Internet meme.

Video game composer Tommy Tallarico had claimed ownership of the copyright to the sound in 2019 and stated that its use was copyright infringement, though a late 2020 agreement was reached where the sound became a paid asset. Tallarico also claimed that he had personally created the sound, despite Messiah's credits also crediting Joey Kuras, a sound designer then employed by Tallarico, with designing the game's sounds alongside him, and the sound effect's metadata crediting Kuras with its creation. In July 2022, Roblox announced on Twitter that the "oof" sound had been removed from the platform, replacing it with a new default death audio. In November 2022, British video essayist Hbomberguy published an exposé that disputed Tallarico's claim that he had created the sound effect. In July 2025, Roblox announced that it would bring back the "oof" sound in a video posted on Twitter, now known as X, nearly three years after its removal and replacement.

== Origin ==
The original sound was first used in the 2000 computer game Messiah by American video game developers Shiny Entertainment and Interplay Entertainment, with video game music composer Tommy Tallarico and sound designer Joey Kuras, then an employee of Tallarico's, credited for designing these kinds of sound effects. Tallarico has at times claimed that Kuras created the sound, that it was a collaboration between the pair, and that he created it himself. In June 2019, Tallarico noted that the sound effect's metadata credited Kuras, indicating its origin in Messiah. British video essayist Harry Brewis, known online as Hbomberguy, stated in his own investigation that he found that the metadata solely credited Kuras and not Tallarico, though he did not consider this definitive proof that Kuras had created the sound alone.

== History ==
=== Initial adoption and spread ===
Roblox was publicly released in 2006. The sound effect was adopted as the platform's default audio for player character deaths. According to GamesBeat, the sound was stored within the Roblox directory under the filename "uuhhh.mp3"; its file metadata indicates a 0.34-second duration and a timestamp dated September 1999. The "oof" sound later became viral as an internet meme and is often used in videos, song remixes, or to censor expletives.

=== 2019–2022: Copyright dispute and removal ===
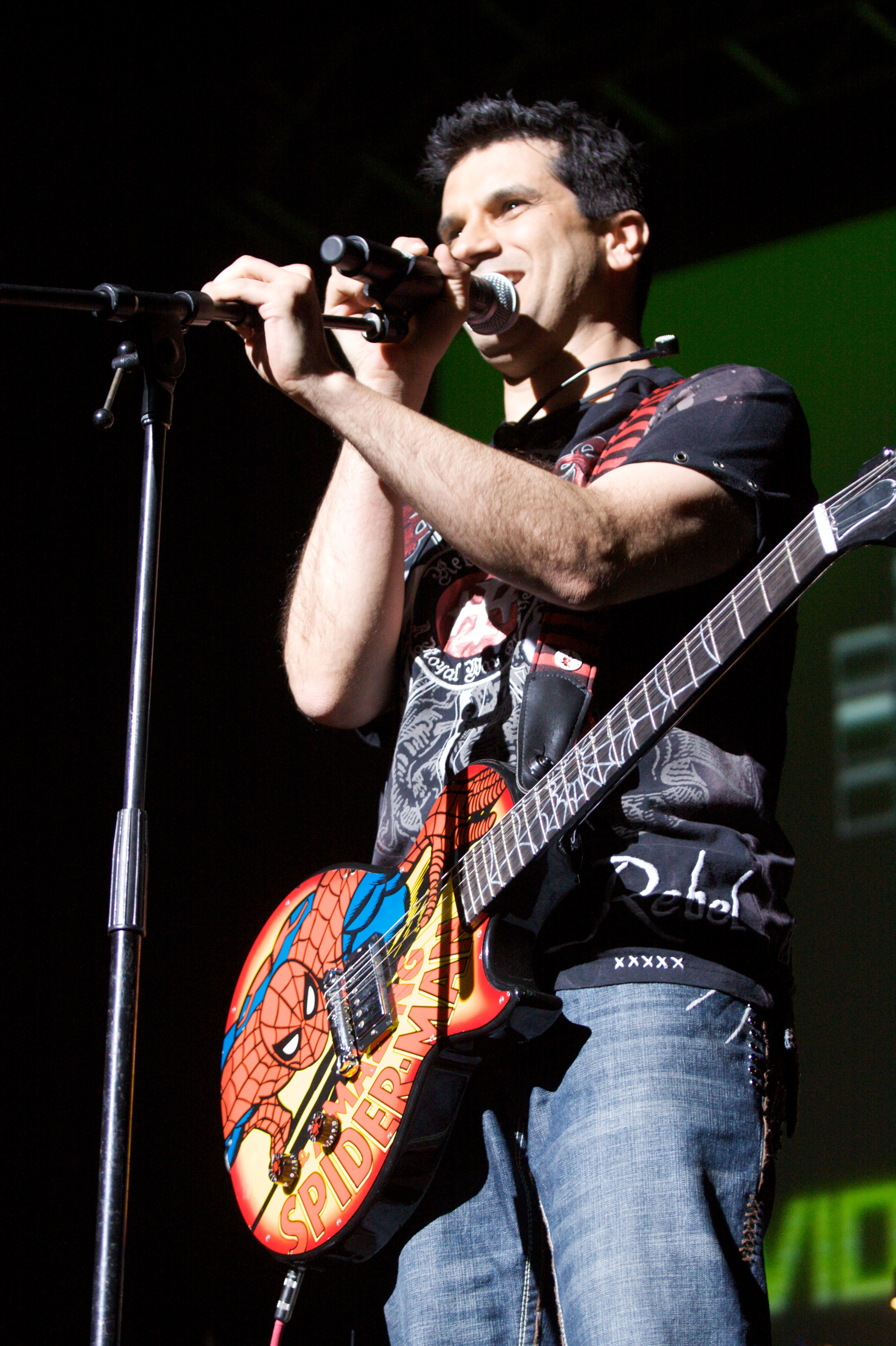
Tommy Tallarico (pictured in 2009) claims the copyright to the "Roblox oof" sound and claimed to have personally produced it.

In 2019, the American video game developer Roblox Corporation was contacted by the owner of the action-adventure video game Messiah, and was later involved in a copyright dispute with Tallarico. Tallarico claimed Roblox obtained the sound effect from an illegal website and was using it without his permission. Roblox denied this in a public statement, saying that the sound had instead come from a CD-ROM of stock sound effects, which the game's original creators had purchased for use. An agreement between the two was later reached in late 2020, which made the "oof" sound a purchasable sound asset for 100 Robux, the platform's currency. Tallarico made four audio design libraries for developers, with prices ranging from US$10 to US$250. In July 2022, Roblox made a post addressing a new update on Twitter which says that the "oof" sound effect had been removed from the platform due to a licensing issue, replacing it with a new default death audio. In November 2022, British YouTuber Hbomberguy published "ROBLOX_OOF.mp3", a video essay which documented and disputed many claims Tommy Tallarico had made concerning his career, including being the creator of the "oof" sound effect at the center of the copyright dispute with Roblox.

=== 2025: Return of the "oof" sound ===
On July 18, 2025, Roblox announced that the original "oof" sound would return to the platform, making the audio available for developers on the Roblox Creator Hub. Roblox uploaded a video on Twitter, now known as X, writing "A comeback so good it hurts". The clip shows a character walking toward the camera before exploding into pieces, accompanied by the classic "oof" sound.

== Reception and legacy ==
The "oof" sound has gained the status of a popular internet meme and was described by The Verge as "iconic". In late 2020, after its licensing agreement, Tommy Tallarico described the "oof" sound as "one of the most iconic pop culture audio clips of the 21st century," and referred to himself as the "oof guy".

After its removal in 2022, a case study by Sage Publications noted that the removal was met with backlash from the community. Writing for NME, Francis Kenna reported that players felt the "life" in Roblox had been "sucked out" by the change. The replacement sound effect was also criticized by The Verge, which viewed it as "some sort of guttural grunt". Dictionary.com noted in August 2023 that the "oof" sound had evolved into an online interjection.

When the sound had returned in July 2025, Windows Central noted that they were "glad to see the 26-year-old audio live on once again in Roblox".
