= Virtuous Pedophiles =

Internet-based support group for pedophiles

- Website type: Internet Forum
- Available in: English
- Founded: June 2012
- Founders: Ethan Edwards; Nick Devin
- Website: virped.org (home page)
- Users: 8730
- Current status: Alive

Virtuous Pedophiles is an Internet-based mutual support and public awareness group for pedophiles who acknowledge having a sexual attraction to children but want to lead normal productive lives without abusing children. The two founders of the group, who operate under the pseudonyms Ethan Edwards and Nick Devin, have stated that the initial goal of the group was to improve the "public relations" of pedophiles "to help people see that we're not all molesters" and to help other pedophiles.

== History ==
Virtuous Pedophiles was founded in June 2012 by Nick Devin and Ethan Edwards as a spinoff of B4U-ACT's support group. According to the organization, its intent is to provide support and resources to people who are attracted to minors so they "remain law-abiding, and lead happy, productive lives". Its website provides individual informational pages over multiple topics, including advice "for young pedophiles", "for partners" and "for therapists". It has also gathered some media attention and became a place where journalists seek people to interview on the subject of pedophilia.

As of 2016, it had over 1,000 members and averaged over 3,000 monthly posts. Unlike other pedophilia-themed websites, Virtuous Pedophiles cautions adults not to have sex with minors. It states on its website that "we believe that sexual activity between adults and children is wrong".

The group also operates a peer support group, founded in 2013. As of 2018, it had reached 2,500 registered users, most being in their 20's and approximately 90% male. The group has also allowed researchers and mental health professionals to join, and has been used by researchers to find samples of non-offending people who are attracted to minors.

== Reception ==
The group's efforts have been discussed by human sexuality experts, such as Jesse Bering. Local executive director of the Exploited Child Division of the National Center for Missing & Exploited Children John Shehan has argued the group may be a cover for pedophiles that wish to share strategies for grooming children, stating that "while on the cover you think there may be legitimate reasons and purposes, not everybody who joins those groups has an altruistic motive".

In 2017, Alexander McBride of Vice News wrote: "many of these claims [of not offending] cannot be verified. Perhaps some are using VirPed as a cover-up; perhaps some, who were even more daring, saw my photo story as a way to prove they had nothing to hide. I cannot guarantee that this is not the case and I can understand why many would be suspicious."

== See also ==
- Association for the Treatment and Prevention of Sexual Abuse – American non-profit organization
- Circles of Support and Accountability – Reintegration program for sex offenders
- Prevention Project Dunkelfeld – German clinical and support services organization for pedophiles and hebephiles
