= Mermaids (charity) =

British charity that supports transgender youth

- Founded: 1995
- Type: Nonprofit advocacy organisation
- Registration no.: 1160575
- Purpose: Transgender rights
- Location(s): Offices in London and Leeds
- Chair of Trustees: Kathryn Downs
- Revenue: £1,174,597 (2024)
- Expenses: £1,920,180 (2024)
- Staff: 18 employees, 7 trustees, 31 volunteers (2020)
- Website: mermaidsuk.org.uk

Mermaids is a British charity and advocacy organisation that supports gender variant and transgender youth. It also provides inclusion and diversity training. Mermaids was founded in 1995 by a group of parents of gender nonconforming children and became a charitable incorporated organisation in 2015.

== History ==
=== Formation and leadership ===
Mermaids was founded in 1995 by a group of parents of gender nonconforming children, originally acting as a small helpline. It aims to provide support for transgender youth up to 20 years of age. Mermaids became a charitable incorporated organisation in 2015.

Susie Green was the chief executive from January 2016 until 25 November 2022 when she was dismissed because the trustees had lost confidence in her ability to lead the organisation. Previously she worked as an IT manager at the Citizens Advice Bureau in Leeds. Green was a trustee of Mermaids for four years from 2011. Her daughter is one of the youngest individuals in the UK to have transitioned surgically.

Lauren Stoner was made interim chief executive in December 2022 and was appointed CEO for two years in February 2024.

In August 2023, it was announced that Belinda Bell would be stepping down as chair of the charity, while remaining as a trustee. Kathryn Downs, who is transgender, became chair in February 2024.

In September 2025, it was announced that Kathryn Downs would step down from her trustee role to become Interim CEO after Lauren Stoner stepped down. Jo Hardy was appointed CEO on 5 November 2025; Kathryn Downs was reappointed Chair of Trustees 8 December 2025.

=== The Tavistock Gender Identity Development Service ===
In the years from 2000, Mermaids alongside another campaign group, GIRES (Gender Identity Research and Education Society), lobbied clinicians at NHS Gender Identity Development Service (GIDS) to allow children access to early treatments such as puberty blockers. GIDS began prescribing blockers from 2011 onwards, making them widely available in response to demand from families. Green said: "...we don't have any say on how they operate, how they prescribe, what they do in terms of the process."

In July 2022, NHS England decided to close GIDS and replace it with regional healthcare centres, following the publication of the independent Cass Review. In response to the decision, Mermaids CEO Susie Green said she was "cautiously optimistic", but expressed concerns that priority would be given to psychological treatments over medical care. She said: "We would not want any further barriers to be put in place in terms of access to medical intervention."

=== Online harassment of staff ===
In 2017, Mermaids reported that it and its volunteers had been the victims of online harassment. CEO Green stated that she had been falsely accused of forcibly castrating her transgender daughter. Her daughter said, "If my mum had not helped me, I would not be here today". Journalist Paris Lees, who is transgender, wrote: "Susie Green is saving lives and I wish my parents had known about Mermaids when I was growing up." Green raised concerns "that the social media backlash may put people off coming to the charity for help".

=== National Lottery funding ===
In December 2018, the charity was allocated £500,000 in funding by the Big Lottery Fund, to create a national network of local groups. The funding was subsequently put under review after criticism of the charity, including by anti-trans activist Graham Linehan, who created a post on Mumsnet calling for members of the forum to email their concerns to the National Lottery. In response to this, on 18 January 2019, YouTuber Hbomberguy began a livestream attempting to 101% complete the video game Donkey Kong 64, with a goal of $500 to be donated to Mermaids. The stream became popular and raised over US$350,000 for Mermaids. Among other guests, the stream featured an appearance by US Congresswoman Alexandria Ocasio-Cortez. On 19 February 2019, the National Lottery concluded its review into the charity and said it would proceed with the promised donation, stating that it "did not find any grounds to withhold the grant". In October 2022, National Lottery funding was paused again due to an investigation by the Charity Commission.

=== Media ===
The 2018 ITV drama series Butterfly, about a young transgender girl, was substantially informed by Mermaids and its CEO, Susie Green, who worked with playwright Tony Marchant as a consultant on the series. Marchant and cast members Emmett J. Scanlan and Anna Friel also met families involved with Mermaids to inform their performances.

In July 2020, the charity complained that the BBC had no longer included links to themselves on BBC LGBTQ advice pages, alongside two other organisations. The BBC said that Mermaids was removed after complaints were made about the information it provided, and for impartiality reasons.

=== Data breach ===
In June 2019, The Times revealed that they had discovered a data breach by Mermaids in which confidential emails had been made readily available through their website. The Times said that these included names of transgender children and their parents, together with contact details and intimate medical information. The newspaper reported that there were internal emails from the trustees which criticised the leadership by Susie Green, as well as criticism from parents. Mermaids issued a press release on the same day, which acknowledged that a data breach had occurred, and that they had informed the Information Commissioner's Office and had corrected the breach. The press release stated that the breach was limited to internal emails and that no emails to and from families were part of the information leaked; The Times disputed this. After an investigation, Mermaids were required to pay a £25,000 fine.

=== Training ===
Some anti-trans pressure groups, including Safe Schools Alliance and Transgender Trend, have argued that resources used by Mermaids in training sessions reinforce rigid gender roles and might cause non-conforming children to identify as transgender. Writer Kate Lister said that the resource is "a visual representation of gender identifying markers ... At no point does anyone suggest children who act in ways that do not conform to a gender are trans. At no point does anyone suggest gay children are trans." Mermaids released a statement saying that they have never encouraged teachers "to state that 'tomboys' should be transgender", and that they do not provide classroom talks or lesson materials for schools, contrary to what had been reported in some newspapers.

Following the commencement of the regulatory compliance case by the Charity Commission in 2022, the Department for Education removed Mermaids from its mental health and wellbeing resources for schools.

=== Government policy ===
The charity criticised the UK Government's April 2021 decision to disband the LGBT advisory board without a planned replacement, describing the move as "very concerning".

=== Challenge to LGB Alliance charitable status ===
In June 2021, Mermaids and other charities, including Stonewall, began raising funds to appeal against the awarding of charitable status to LGB Alliance, describing the latter group's activities as "denigrating trans people". The case began in September 2022, and concluded in July 2023. The judges ruled that "the law does not permit Mermaids to challenge the decision made by the Charity Commission to register LGB Alliance as a charity".

=== Conference at Great Ormond Street Hospital ===
In March 2022, Susie Green was due to speak on a panel regarding support for transgender youth, alongside Stephanie Davies-Arai, of Transgender Trend, a "gender-critical" website. The panel would have been part of an event, eventually postponed, for an expected 100 to 150 trainee child psychiatrists organised by Great Ormond Street Hospital and Health Education England. Paediatrician Hilary Cass, journalist Helen Joyce, psychotherapist Stella O'Malley, and academic Lisa Littman would also have participated.

Following complaints to the organisers by Mermaids and a trainee doctor, Davies-Arai's appearance was cancelled. Susie Green said that Mermaids "cannot be a part of a conference that gives a platform to Transgender Trend" and advised the organisers to "stay clear of anyone involved with anti-trans pseudo-medical platforms that have been set up with the sole intention of attacking trans people (especially trans youth) and their healthcare." Davies-Arai said that it "should concern everyone that the NHS has allowed unsubstantiated claims of 'transphobia' to influence their decisions."

=== Standards of Care ===
In September 2022, Susie Green co-authored the 8th edition of Standards of Care for the Health of Transgender and Gender Diverse People, issued by the World Professional Association for Transgender Health.

=== The Daily Telegraph investigation ===
In September 2022, Mermaids was the subject of an investigation by The Daily Telegraph, which accused the charity of offering chest binders to transgender youth without parental consent and to have told users they believed to be as young as 13 that puberty-blocking medications are "totally reversible". The investigation relied largely on an anonymous adult pretending to be a 14-year-old named "Kai" in order to access services from Mermaids. The Telegraph, posing as "Kai", exchanged emails with the charity, during which the charity staff agreed to offer them a chest binder. The Daily Telegraph criticized the charity for not investigating the fictional Kai's mental health and for not requiring that "Kai" inform an adult, despite "Kai" describing their parents as unaccepting in the email exchanges.

Mermaids responded by saying that they take "a harm reduction position with the understanding that providing a young person with a binder and comprehensive safety guidelines from an experienced member of staff is preferable to the likely alternative of unsafe practices and/or continued or increasing dysphoria".

=== Charity Commission Inquiry ===
On 29 September 2022 the Charity Commission opened a regulatory compliance case into Mermaids, based on complaints made about the charity as a result of The Daily Telegraph's investigation. Mermaids subsequently submitted a number of serious incidents reports to the commission in relation to issues raised in the media, and also closed its helpline temporarily due to what it described as "intolerable abuse" received by staff and volunteers. Funding from the National Lottery was paused during this investigation.

Susie Green was dismissed on 25 November 2022 after six years in post because the trustees had lost confidence in her ability to lead the organisation, although the reason for and nature of her departure was not made public at the time.

On 2 December 2022 it was announced that the Charity Commission had opened a statutory inquiry on 28 November and that the charity's management and governance were now being looked at. The Charity Commission said the opening of the inquiry was not a finding of wrongdoing.

In July 2024, with the inquiry still ongoing, Mermaids said it was "significantly impacting our services, staff and volunteer wellbeing, our reputation, and our finances".

The Charity Commission report was released in October 2024, the commission said that the poor governance amounted to mismanagement. The investigation found that Mermaids had provided 15 breast binders to minors between the ages of 13 and 16 without the knowledge of their parents or guardians between January 2021 and September 2022. The investigation also found that the charity had failed to carry out sufficient due diligence checks when recruiting trustees, and should never have appointed Jacob Breslow as a trustee. The report found no evidence that Mermaids had inappropriate connections with the controversial GIDS service at the Tavistock Centre or with private medical practices, nor had they failed to implement proper safeguarding policies. Additionally, there was no evidence that Mermaids had given medical advice or issued medical referrals to children without parental approval.

The inquiry issued "regulatory advice and guidance" to the charity telling them to further consider the Cass Review's findings and conclusions as well as review the guidance and positions on their website regarding puberty blockers, particularly relating to claims of reversibility. Mermaids was also told to get consent from the parents or guardians if they ever resume providing breast binders to minors.

Orlando Fraser, the chair of the Commission said: "We have carefully scrutinised Mermaids' activities through a statutory inquiry and have found mismanagement in a number of areas. Mermaids cooperated with our investigation and has been actively addressing the various concerns raised. Additionally, following the Cass review, we have required Mermaids to present a more accurate picture on its website as to the risks involved in the use of puberty blockers, and to follow Cass review findings on the involvement of parents in social transitioning as regards any future provision of chest binders to children."

Kathryn Downs, the chair of the trustees of Mermaids, said: "We are relieved that the Charity Commission inquiry which began nearly two years ago is finally over. The report states, as we anticipated, that there is no finding of misconduct at Mermaids. The commission has also confirmed, as we have repeatedly asserted, that we have not provided medical advice or acted improperly in our work with children, young people and their families."

=== Resignation of trustee ===
In October 2022, Jacob Breslow of the London School of Economics resigned as a trustee of Mermaids after it was revealed he had spoken at a conference organised by B4U-ACT, a paedophile support group, as a PhD student in 2011. In a statement, Mermaids described the organisation as "completely at odds" with its values, and said that "Once notified we took swift and decisive action to investigate ... Safeguarding is of the utmost importance to Mermaids and the safety of the young people we support is our highest priority." Belinda Bell, the chair of trustees, apologised for the distress caused by the news of Breslow's links to the group, and said that he should never have been appointed to the board.

On 12 October 2022, Miriam Cates MP used Prime Minister's Questions to ask for a police investigation into Mermaids. In response, the charity said that her "attitudes to LGBT organisations are well-documented and this is not the first time she has criticised Mermaids".
