= Robin Wilson (psychologist) =

Robin J. Wilson
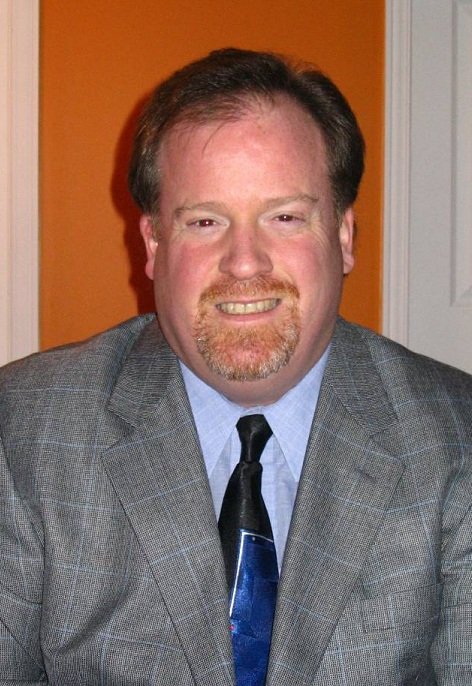
- Robin J. Wilson in 2012
- Education: B.Sc. (1988), M.Ed. (1991), PhD (1996)
- Alma mater: University of Toronto
- Occupation: Psychologist
- Website: http://www.robinjwilson.com/about.shtml

Robin J. Wilson is a Canadian psychologist, specializing in work on sex offenders.

== Biography ==
Wilson received his B.Sc. from Victoria College of the University of Toronto (1988) and his M.Ed. and Ph.D. in educational psychology from Ontario Institute for Studies in Education of the University of Toronto (1991, 1996). He served as chief psychologist for the Community of the Ontario Region, at the Keele Centre in Toronto and has worked with persons who have sexually offended for over 35 years.

== Work ==
Wilson is one of the pioneers of Circles of Support and Accountability (COSA). He was president of the Florida Association for the Treatment of Sexual Abusers and is on the board of directors of the national Association for the Treatment of Sexual Abusers. He is an assistant clinical professor [adjunct], Department of Psychiatry and Behavioural Neurosciences at McMaster University (Hamilton, Ontario) and was a professor of forensic practice at the Humber College Institute of Technology & Advanced Learning (Toronto, Ontario). He was editor of the ATSA Forum and the SAJRT Blogspot, the official blog of Sexual Abuse: A Journal of Research and Treatment. He serves on the editorial boards of the Howard Journal of Criminal Justice, the Journal of Sexual Aggression, and Sexual Abuse: A Journal of Research and Treatment.

Wilson was one of the developers and remains associated with the Circles of Support and Accountability, a method of treating sex offenders that has been associated with a 70% drop in rates of reoffending, and is now being adopted in jurisdictions throughout the world.

== Views ==
Wilson is a vocal critic of American sex offender registry policies. He opined that sex offender registries are more public relations tools than crime-fighting tools and that resources would be better spent on prevention and treatment. Moreover, he said that by public policies becoming increasingly punitive, families may become less likely to report cases of sexual abuse occurring within families. During discussions of changes to Canadian models of sex offender treatment, Wilson told the National Post that Canada had been the envy of the world in its methods for 15–20 years and that the U.S. should consider using the Canadian models instead of Canada attempting to use U.S. models.

In 2003, Wilson told CBC News that approximately 15% of sex offenders repeat their crimes, rather than having very high rates of recidivism. He similarly challenges the exaggerated fear of strangers as the most likely perpetrators of sex offences. "The stats are really, really clear ... If you are going to be offended by anyone, it will be by someone you know, most likely in your own home."

During the fall-out of the Jerry Sandusky case, Wilson noted that there can be subtle clues that a person is a pedophile, such as having little interest in sex with their wives, such as Sandusky's wife reported.

== Selected works ==
- Watson, R.J. (1991). Videotape Review: "Why, God - Why Me?" and "Four Men Speak Out on Surviving Child Sexual Abuse." Annals of Sex Research, 4, 293-295.
- Wilson, R.J., & Prinzo, M. (2001). Circles of support: A restorative justice initiative. Journal of Psychology and Human Sexuality, 13, 59-77.
- Wilson, R.J., Huculak, B., & McWhinnie, A. (2002). Restorative justice innovations in Canada. Behavioral Sciences & the Law, 20, 1-18.
- Wilson, R.J., McWhinnie, A.J., Picheca, J.E., Prinzo, M., & Cortoni, F. (2007). Circles of Support & Accountability: Engaging community volunteers in the management of high-risk sexual offenders. Howard Journal of Criminal Justice, 46, 1-15.
- Wilson, R. J., Picheca, J. E., & Prinzo, M. (2005). Circles of Support & Accountability: An Evaluation of the Pilot Project in South-Central Ontario. Correctional Service of Canada.
- Wilson, R.J., Picheca, J.E., & Prinzo, M. (2007). Evaluating the effectiveness of professionally-facilitated volunteerism in the community-based management of high risk sexual offenders: PART TWO—A comparison of recidivism rates. Howard Journal of Criminal Justice, 46, 327-337.
- Wilson, R.J., McWhinnie, A.J., & Wilson, C. (2008). Circles of Support & Accountability: An international partnership in reducing sexual offender recidivism. Prison Service Journal, 138, 26-36.
- Wilson, R.J., Cortoni, F., & McWhinnie, A.J. (2009). Circles of Support & Accountability: A Canadian national replication of outcome findings. Sexual Abuse: A Journal of Research & Treatment, 21, 412-430.
- Prescott, D.S., & Wilson, R.J. (2011). Paradoxical and double-bind communication in treatment for persons who sexually offend. Journal of Sexual Aggression.
