= Estibaliz Urresola Solaguren =

Spanish film director

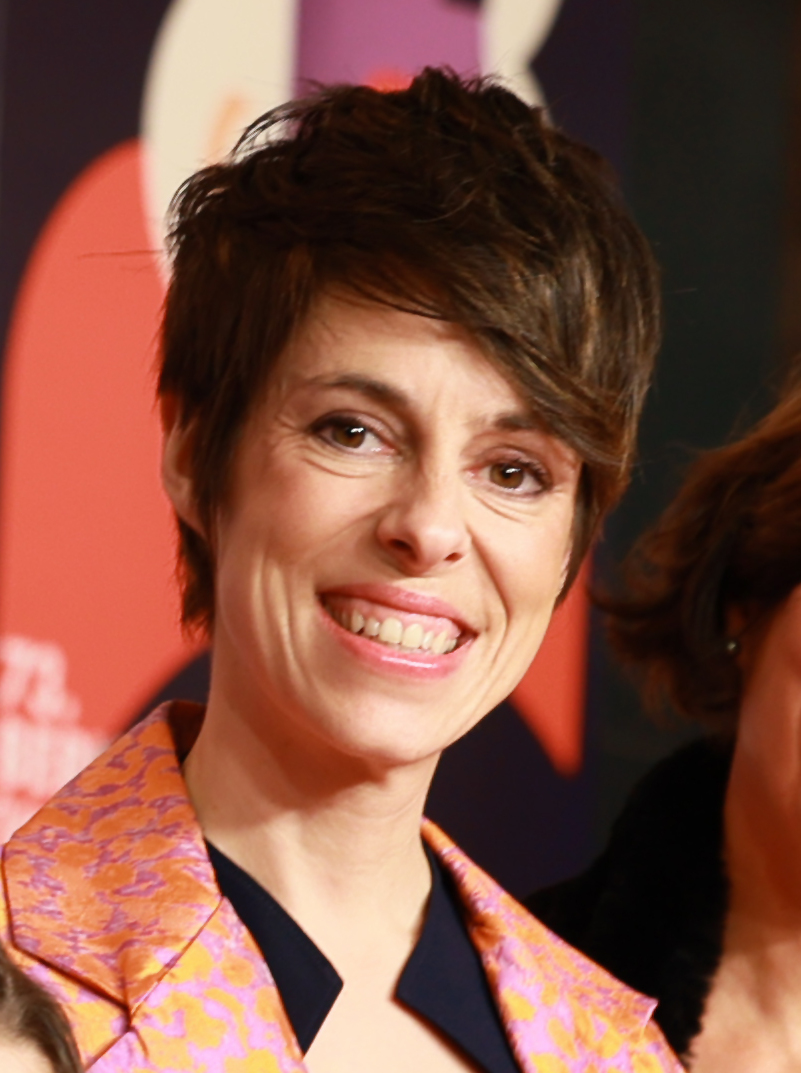
- Urresola in 2023.
- Born: 4 April 1984 (age 42); Laudio, Basque Country, Spain
- Education: University of the Basque Country (BA); Escuela Internacional de Cine y Televisión (BA); Cinema and Audiovisual School of Catalonia (MA)
- Occupation: Filmmaker
- Years active: 2011–present
- Website: sirimirifilms.eu/en/home/

Estibaliz Urresola Solaguren (born 4 May 1984) is a Spanish film director, screenwriter, and producer.

She has won awards for Voces de papel (2016), a documentary, and Cuerdas (2022), a short film, while her first feature film, 20,000 Species of Bees (2023), has won a variety of awards at various film festivals.

== Biography ==
Urresola was born on 4 May 1984 in Laudio/Llodio, located in the province of Álava in the autonomous community of Basque Country in northern Spain.

She has bachelor's degrees in Audiovisual Communication from the University of the Basque Country and Film Editing from the Escuela Internacional de Cine y Televisión. Urresola has master's degrees in Film Direction and Film Business—Marketing, distribution and international sales from the Cinema and Audiovisual School of Catalonia (ESCAC). She has worked since 2011 in the Basque film and television industry.

== Significant films ==
=== Voces de papel ===
Voces de papel is a 2016 full-length documentary about Eresoinka, a mixed instrumental, vocal, and choreographic ensemble of Basque performers that toured internationally from 1937 during the Spanish Civil War until the outbreak of World War II, which forced Eresoinka to return to Europe from the United States. It won the Premio Txapela de Oro for best documentary at the San Sebastián International Film Festival.

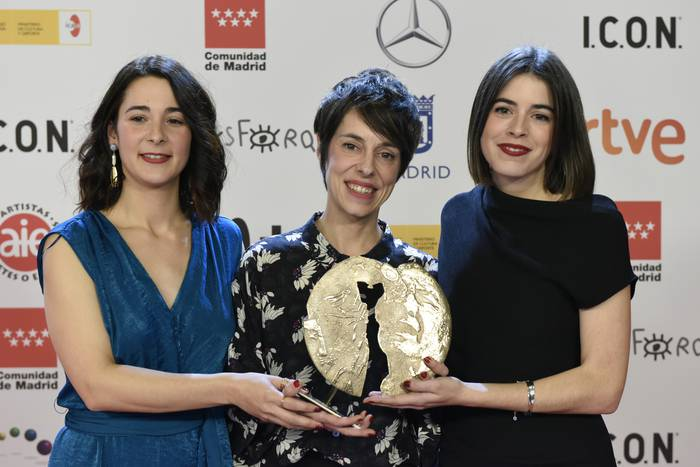
Urresola receiving the 2022 Forqué Award for best short film for Cuerdas

=== Cuerdas ===
Cuerdas (2022) is a half-hour fictional film about a women's choir in an industrial town has lost its funding from the municipality. A local company, whose factory has contaminated the area surrounding the town, offers to sponsor the choir. With the survival of the choir in doubt, the members must decide whether to accept the sponsorship or not. It was nominated for and won many prizes.

=== 20,000 Species of Bees ===
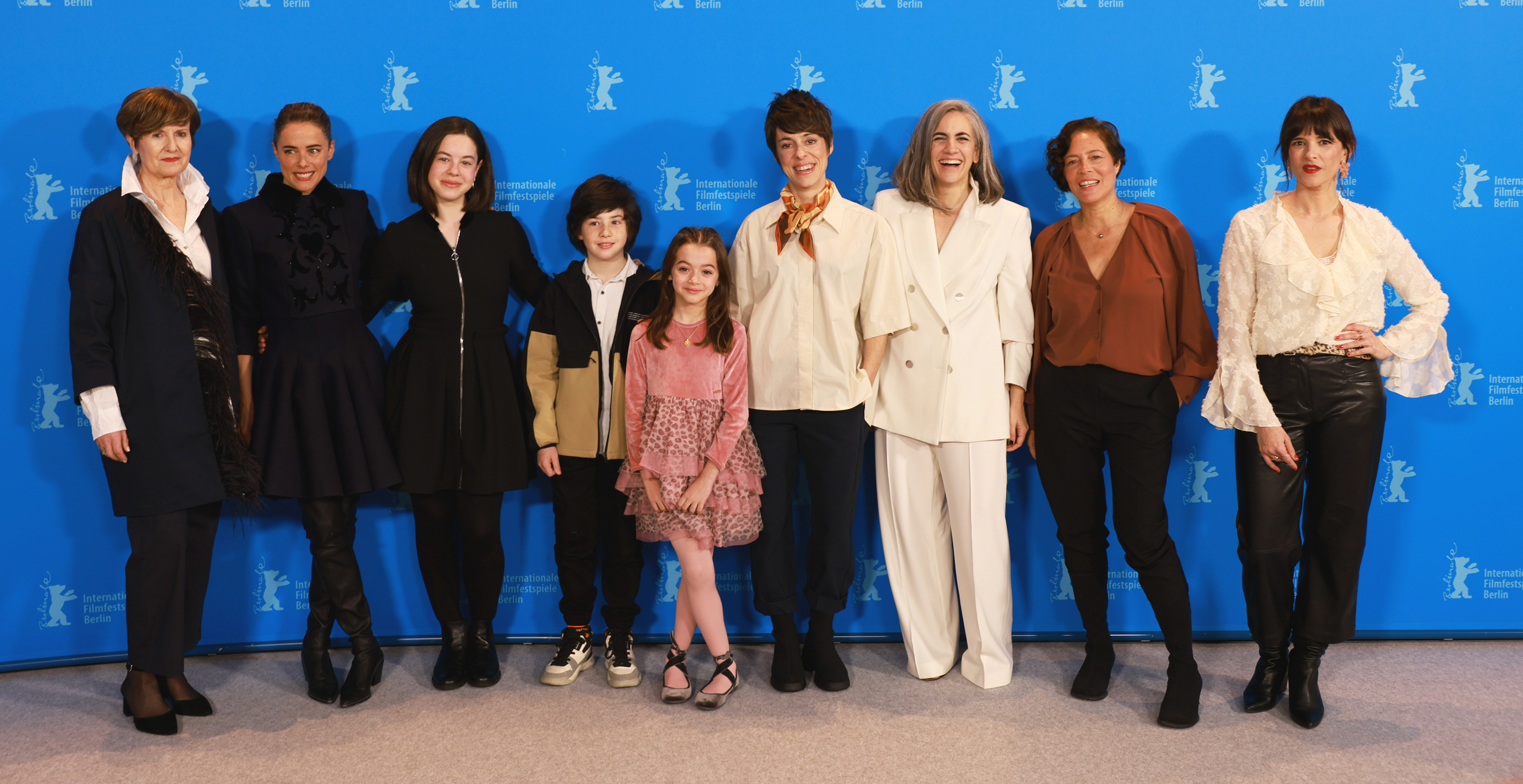
Urresola, Sofía Otero, and the 20,000 Species of Bees film crew, Berlinale 2023

This was Urresola's first feature film. Her goal of was for the audience to feel the ups and downs of a family with a transgender child. The inspiration for the story was the suicide of Ekai Lersundi in 2018. Ekai Lersundi was a transgender 16-year-old boy from Ondarroa who had waited in vain for a hormonal treatment. Urresola was affected by the poignant note Lersundi left behind to illustrate his despair and his hope that divulging his suffering might bring about a societal change.

The film tells the story of a transgender girl, and its effect on the family. To help an accurate portrayal, Naizen, a regional association for the families of transgender minors, worked with the director and provided guidance for Sofía Otero who played the main character.

In the film, the family crosses borders, including the one that separates Bayonne in France and Laudio/Llodio in Spanish Basque Country. Although Spanish is predominant in that film, Basque and French are also heard. Urresola seeks naturalism in the conversations between the mother (Patricia López Arnaiz) and her children. Gender dysphoria is dealt with somewhat didactically, but with emotion. "Why am I like this?" asks little Cocó (Otero).

As the director explains:

Spanish: La niña no se transforma, adquiere a lo largo de la película las herramientas para expresar quién es. La que se transforma es la familia.

English: The girl does not transform. Throughout the film, she acquires the tools to express who she is. What is transformed is the family.

— Estibaliz Urresola

In addition to the festival awards that the film itself won and those that Urresola won as a director, Otero won a best performer award, Patricia López Arnaiz won a best supporting actress award, and there were two awards for best female ensemble cast.

== Filmography ==
| Year | Title | English translation | Director | Producer | Writer | Editor | Notes | Ref. |
|---|---|---|---|---|---|---|---|---|
| 2011 | Adri | Adri | Yes | No | Yes | No | short film | |
| 2013 | 1001 formas de tomar café | 1001 Ways to Drink Coffee | Yes | No | No | No | segment in short documentary | |
| 2016 | Voces de papel | Paper Voices | Yes | No | Yes | co-editor Pello Gutierrez | full-length documentary | |
| 2018 | Nor Nori Nork | The Declensions | Yes | No | Yes | Yes | short documentary film | |
| 2020 | Polvo somos | We Are Dust | Yes | Yes | Yes | co-editor Ibai Elortza | short film | |
| 2022 | Cuerdas | Chords | Yes | co-producer | Yes | No | short film | |
| 2023 | 20.000 especies de abejas | 20,000 Species of Bees | Yes | No | Yes | No | feature length | |

== Awards and nominations ==
Overall awards for films directed by or directing awards received by Urresola
| Year | Film | Festival award | Category | Result | Ref. |
|---|---|---|---|---|---|
| 2012 | Adri | 4th Gaudí Awards | Best Short Film | prenomimated | |
| 2016 | Voces de papel | San Sebastián International Film Festival | Premio Txapela de Oro for best documentary | Won | |
| 2022 | Cuerdas | Critics' Week | Rails d'Ory | Won | |
| 2022 | Cuerdas | Montpellier Mediterranean Film Festival | Grand prix du court métrage de Montpellier Méditerranée Métropole | Won | |
| 2022 | Cuerdas | 28th Forqué Awards | Best Short Film | Won | |
| 2022 | Cuerdas | Curtas Vila do Conde | Best Fiction | Won | |
| 2022 | Cuerdas | Guanajuato International Film Festival | Premio SIGNIS al Mejor Cortometraje Ficción Internacional | Won | |
| 2023 | 20,000 Species of Bees | 73rd Berlin International Film Festival | Golden Bear | Nominated | |
| 2023 | 20,000 Species of Bees | 73rd Berlin International Film Festival | Prize of the Guild of German Art House Cinemas | Won | |
| 2023 | 20,000 Species of Bees | 73rd Berlin International Film Festival | Berliner Morgenpost Reader's Jury Award | Won | |
| 2023 | 20,000 Species of Bees | 73rd Berlin International Film Festival | GWFF Best First Feature Award | Nominated | |
| 2023 | 20,000 Species of Bees | 73rd Berlin International Film Festival | Teddy Award | Nominated | |
| 2023 | 20,000 Species of Bees | 26th Málaga Film Festival | Golden Biznaga for Best Spanish Film | Won | |
| 2023 | 20,000 Species of Bees | Seattle International Film Festival | Official Competition Grand Jury Prize | Won | |
| 2023 | 20,000 Species of Bees | Guadalajara International Film Festival | Iberoamerican Competition – Best Film | Nominated | |
| 2023 | 20,000 Species of Bees | Guadalajara International Film Festival | Iberoamerican Competition – Best First Film | Won | |
| 2023 | 20,000 Species of Bees | Guadalajara International Film Festival | Iberoamerican Competition – Best Directing | Won | |

== See also ==
- 20,000 Species of Bees
- Sofia Otero
- Cinema and Audiovisual School of Catalonia
