= Ekai Lersundi =

Spanish LGBTQ rights activists

Ekai Lersundi Martínez (October 13, 2001 – February 15, 2018) was a Spanish transgender teenager, activist, and role model of the LGTBI+ movement, who died by suicide at the age of 16 while waiting for hormone therapy.

== Biography ==
From the age of 3, the family began receiving reports from teachers about alleged immaturity and learning difficulties, later identified as dyslexia and dyscalculia. Despite these challenges, he showed strong dedication to his studies. In secondary education, his difficulties increased, and he began to withdraw socially.

Although he occasionally told his parents he "wanted to be a boy", it wasn't taken too seriously. However, his preferences for clothing and haircuts became more noticeable. In 2017, Lersundi came out to his parents as a boy. They supported him and contacted the association Chrysallis. Association of Families of Trans Children and Youth, made up of families in similar situations. With help from his mother, Ekai chose the name he would use in his new identity. He also informed his friends and acquaintances, who responded with great support. The next step was to inform his school and the health system, which proved more difficult as they lacked experience with similar cases.

Fond of writing, he planned to study Arts Baccalaureate at the Durango High School (Biscay) and later pursue a degree in Audiovisual Communication at university. He was also interested in photography and Japanese culture.

=== Activism and suicide ===
From the beginning, he had the support of his family and defended his gender identity, even speaking to the media. Ekai promoted training sessions for teachers and students at his school; these sessions were approved by the Basque Government in February 2017, though Lersundi never saw them implemented. Overcoming his shyness, he succeeded in getting classmates and teachers to stop using his birth name and start calling him Ekai.

Although he could have accessed treatment in Barcelona, Lersundi decided to request hormone treatment at Hospital de Cruces (Barakaldo, Biscay) as a form of activism. At the time, regulations allowed this treatment from the age of 16, but the authorization was delayed. As a result, Ekai began developing female secondary sexual characteristics. This placed him in a critical situation. His parents filed a complaint, but the situation overwhelmed him, and on February 15, 2018, his mother found him dead at home.

=== Social impact ===
Lersundi's death brought attention to the struggles of many transgender children in similar situations, highlighting the need for updated support systems. Demands included: consideration of individual needs (not all trans people need hormone or surgical treatment); making it easier to update gender markers in the National ID (which at the time required at least two years of hormone therapy); ending the classification of transitions as psychiatric/psychological disorders; and enacting a unified national Trans Law to replace varying regional rules.

The association Chrysallis, the Municipality of Ondarroa, Save the Children, psychology associations, sexology groups, and LGTBI+ organizations expressed their support for the family. Ekai’s story helped amplify a growing movement for the acceptance of transgender people and the development of professional and legal resources for their protection.

Since October 2018, a monolith honors Ekai on the Itsas Aurre promenade in Ondarroa.

In 2020, the short documentary Mi pequeño gran samurái (My Little Great Samurai), directed by Arantza Ibarra, was released about Ekai’s life and his parents.

In February 2023, the film 20,000 Species of Bees, directed by Estibaliz Urresola Solaguren and inspired by Ekai’s suicide, received a standing ovation at the 73rd Berlinale.
