= Apology video =

Video containing an apology

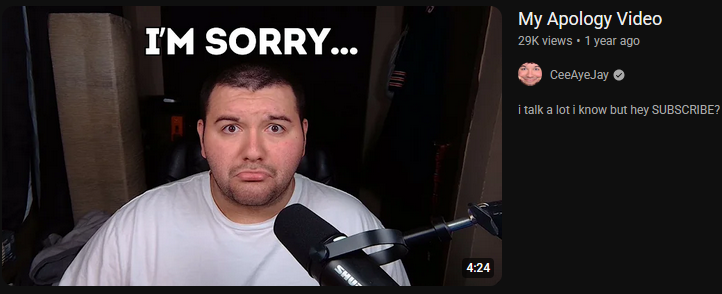
An example of a YouTube apology video

An apology video is a type of video—often published on social media platforms—in which a celebrity, influencer, or other public figure responds to public backlash, controversy, or scandal. These videos are a common form of crisis communication in the digital age and are often analyzed for their tone, sincerity, and effectiveness.

Apology videos have become a recurring phenomenon in internet culture, sometimes attracting significant media attention and public scrutiny. In some cases, they have been parodied or criticized as performative or insincere, especially when perceived to be driven more by reputation management over genuine remorse.

== Features ==
It is common for Internet celebrities to apologise or respond to criticism or backlash in the form of a video. Apology videos, especially from YouTubers, have been described as a genre and are an Internet meme on the platform.

=== Style and cinematography ===
Most apology videos are purposefully orchestrated to elicit sympathy from viewers; individuals filming an apology video may choose to not wear makeup, untidy their hair, or pretend to cry in order to show either relatability, authenticity or sincerity to their audience. A forced sigh, especially at the start of the video, is also common. Regarding the filming location, many may wish to avoid showing any affluence in their videos and use poor or natural lighting in order to generate a more authentic look and feel. By doing this, the person filming the apology video wishes to show vulnerability and establish a level of trust with their audience.

=== Titling and properties ===
On YouTube, apology videos greatly range in length from a single minute to almost an hour, and are titled vaguely. Bettina Makalintal, writing for Vice, cited Logan Paul's "So Sorry", PewDiePie's "My Response", the Labrant Fam's "Addressing All the Hate We've Received" and Raw Alignment's "everything i had wish i said a long time ago" as examples of this, demonstrating also that the titles can be either wordy or brief. The thumbnails of these videos usually show the YouTuber in question with a sincere, teary-eyed expression, while (especially if they are a beauty YouTuber) wearing minimal to no makeup. Despite the name, a video may be referred to as an "apology video" even if it does not feature an apology; the individual may justify or explain their actions, allege that they are a victim of cancel culture, or simply apologise insincerely for the sake of retaining a positive reputation.
