= Susie Green =

One-time CEO of Mermaids (charity)

- Born: 1957 (age 68–69)
- Known for: Former CEO of Mermaids
- Children: 4

Susie Green (born 1957) is the former chief executive officer of Mermaids, a British advocacy organisation for gender variant and transgender youth. She was dismissed on 25 November 2022 after six years of service because the trustees had lost confidence in her ability to lead the organisation.

== Career ==
Green worked as an IT manager for Citizens Advice from 2002 to 2015 prior to her appointment as CEO of Mermaids in 2016. She stepped down as CEO in November 2022. Green advised on the script of 2018 ITV drama, Butterfly and worked alongside the actors and producers, introducing them to some of the young people and parents she helps.

She is involved with WPATH and contributed to the chapter on children up to adolescence in the Standards of Care for the Health of Transgender and Gender Diverse People Version 8 (SOC8).

In 2023, Green founded Anne Trans Healthcare, which makes puberty blockers available to under-18s in the United Kingdom, via a legal route

In 2024 Green was awarded the Trans in the City CEO award.

== Personal life ==
Green lives in Yorkshire with her husband Tim, they have four adult children, including twins. In 2017, Green presented a TED Talk discussing the journey to get gender-affirming surgery for her eldest child at age 16 in Thailand. Green met members of the British royal family at an event to acknowledge the contribution of those working in the mental health sector in the UK.
