= Prevention Project Dunkelfeld =

German clinical and support services organization for pedophiles and hebephiles

The Prevention Project Dunkelfeld (PPD) is an effort founded in Germany to provide clinical and support services to people who are sexually attracted to children (pedophiles) and seek help in controlling their sexual urges, but are otherwise unknown to the legal authorities. The term Dunkelfeld is German for dark figure of crime. It was named that way because its goal is to reduce the amount of unknown cases of child sexual abuse. The project began in Berlin in June 2005 with a large media campaign to contact pedophiles and hebephiles who wanted help from clinicians to manage their paraphilia. The campaign pledged medically confidential treatment free-of-charge. It was initially funded by the Volkswagen Foundation, and has been financially supported by the German government since 2008. The project's slogan is "You are not guilty because of your sexual desire, but you are responsible for your sexual behavior. There is help! Don't become an offender!"

By 2010 a total of 1,134 people had responded. Of those 499 had a completed diagnosis, and 255 had been offered a place in therapy. More than half had previously attempted to find therapy without success. The therapy offered has three main components. Patients are encouraged to accept the fact that they have such sexual inclinations, integrate it into their self-concept, and involve relatives or partners in the therapeutic process. Cognitive behaviour therapy is used to improve coping skills, stress management, and sexual attitudes. Drugs that reduce general sex drive, such as serotonin reuptake inhibitors and anti-androgens, may also be offered. The PPD and those who join the organization have been the subject of several research studies.

== See also ==
- Association for the Treatment and Prevention of Sexual Abuse
- Circles of Support and Accountability – Professionally supervised volunteer groups which support sex offenders with societal reintegration post incarceration
- Virtuous Pedophiles – online support group
