= Jacob Breslow =

American academic

- Title: Associate Professor of Gender Studies

Academic background
- Education: London School of Economics
- Thesis: The theory and practice of childhood: interrogating childhood as a technology of power (2016)
- Doctoral advisor: Clare Hemmings and Sadie Wearing
- Website: https://drjacobbreslow.wordpress.com

Jacob Breslow is an American academic and independent scholar. He was Associate Professor of Gender and Sexuality in the Department of Gender Studies at the London School of Economics (LSE) until he resigned in July 2023, claiming harassment that he claimed was "part of a broader movement against the field of gender studies, and against trans rights and dignity".

He completed his PhD at the LSE Gender Institute in 2016, and published his first monograph entitled Ambivalent Childhoods in 2021 through University of Minnesota Press, in which he analysed childhood in relation to blackness, transfeminism, queerness, and deportability. He was previously an LSE Teaching Fellow in Transnational Sexuality and Gender.

== Research ==
Jacob Breslow participated in queer youth activism for almost a decade prior to beginning his PhD, which led him to study #MeToo, homonationalism, and incarceration. Breslow soon became an expert on contemporary U.S. social justice movements, and the ways in which the idea of childhood operates within and against them, including Black Lives Matter, transfeminism, queer youth activism, and anti-deportation movements.

His PhD thesis analyses the category of childhood as a power structure, an idea which is further developed in his book Ambivalent Childhoods.

Breslow's research expertise also includes the analysis of transphobia in UK public discourse, where he developed a critique of the third conditional, "If I had grown up now, I would have been persuaded to transition", arguing that it is not only being used as a "fabricated straw man" to undermine trans healthcare, but that it could actually be used to support "solidarity between cis and trans" perspectives.

== Resignation from Mermaids ==
Breslow resigned from the board of Mermaids in 2022 after it was reported that, as a graduate student, he had spoken at a conference in 2011 that was organized by B4U-ACT, an organisation which provides support to paedophiles. After an independent investigation by the LSE in 2022, the School stated in January 2023 that, "The independent investigator found that there was no basis for the School to take action against the individual."

Breslow released a statement on 6 October 2022 regarding his participation in the conference:

"I unequivocally condemn child sexual abuse. My work is about protecting marginalised children and young people, not exposing them to harm.

It was my understanding in 2011 that B4U-ACT was an organisation that promotes treatments to prevent offending by paedophiles. I believed at the time that the purpose of the conference was to enable better treatments and interventions that prevent harm to children. I would not have attended the symposium otherwise. I have not been affiliated with B4U-ACT since.

I decided to resign as a Trustee of Mermaids as I did not want to distract from the good work the charity is doing to help transgender and gender diverse children."

== Selected publications ==
- Ambivalent Childhoods: Speculative Futures and the Psychic Life of the Child. University of Minnesota Press. 2021.
