= Circles of Support and Accountability =

Reintegration program for sex offenders

Circles of Support and Accountability (CoSA) are groups of volunteers with professional supervision to support sex offenders as they reintegrate into society after their release from incarceration. Evaluations of CoSA indicate that participation in a CoSA can result in statistically significant reductions in repeat sexual offenses in 70% of cases, relative to what would be predicted by risk assessment or matched comparison subjects. CoSA projects exist throughout Canada, the United Kingdom, and some regions of the United States.

== Description ==
Circles of Support and Accountability are based on restorative justice principles. Each circle involves 4–6 trained volunteers from the community, forming the inner circle around an ex-offender (the "core member"). That circle receives support and training from professionals, who form the outer circle. The inner circle meets regularly to facilitate the core member's practical needs (i.e., access to medical services, social assistance, attainment of employment/affordable housing, etc.), to provide emotional support, to develop constructive and pro-social strategies to address everyday problems, and to challenge the behaviors and attitudes of the core member that may be associated with his offending cycle.

== History ==
The CoSA model of reintegration began in Canada in 1994. According to Susan Love, the Ottawa Program Director for Circles of Support and Accountability, CoSA was started by the Mennonite pastor Harry Nigh, who befriended a mentally delayed, repeat sex offender—a man who had been in and out of institutions his entire life. Nigh and some of his parishioners formed a support group; they obtained funding from the Mennonite Central Committee of Ontario and Correctional Service Canada (CSC) to keep the group going. It was effective; the man did not re-offend.”

Currently, projects are established nationally throughout Canada and the United Kingdom. CoSA projects have also begun in several American jurisdictions. Interest continues to grow in other nations, including The Netherlands, New Zealand, Latvia, Catalonia and France. The CoSA model has provided hope that communities can assist in risk management; the end results are greater safety for potential victims and increased accountability for released offenders.

== Validation ==
Two Canadian studies have focused on the relative rates of reoffending between CoSA Core Members and matched comparison subjects who were not afforded participation in a Circle. In the first study, 60 high-risk sexual offenders involved in CoSA (Core Members from the original pilot project in South-Central Ontario) were matched with 60 high-risk sexual offenders who did not become involved in CoSA (matched comparison subjects). Offenders were matched on risk, length of time in the community, and prior involvement in sexual offender specific treatment. The average follow-up time was 4.5 years. Results showed a 70% reduction in sexual recidivism for the CoSA group in contrast to the matched comparison group, a 57% reduction in all types of violent recidivism (including sexual), and an overall reduction of 35% in all types of recidivism (including violent and sexual).

The second study consisted of a Canadian national replication of the study from the pilot project. The same basic methodology was used—comparing CoSA Core Members to matched comparison subjects. Participants for this study were drawn from CoSA projects across Canada, but not including members of the pilot project. In total, the reoffending of 44 Core Members was evaluated against 44 matched comparison subjects, with an average follow-up time of approximately three years. Similar to the first study, dramatic reductions in rates of reoffending were observed in the group of CoSA Core Members. The study reported an 83% reduction in sexual recidivism, a 73% reduction in all types of violent recidivism (including sexual), and an overall reduction of 71% in all types of recidivism (including sexual and violent) in comparison to the matched offenders. The authors also presented a three-year fixed-comparison analysis, controlling for differences in risk level. Further significant reductions in violent offending (82%) and any offending (83%) were reported, although with a smaller sample than their main analysis (18 Core Members and 17 non-CoSA controls).

The Minnesota Department of Corrections also implemented the Circles of Support and Accountability program as part of its reentry efforts. In 2013, preliminary results from a randomized controlled trial compared 31 Core Members from the Minnesota CoSA (MnCoSA) program with a non-CoSA control sample by prospectively randomly assigning participants to separate groups who either received CoSA or supervision-as-usual. The authors reported a non-significant reduction in sexual recidivism over an average two-year follow-up, but a significant reduction of 40% in re-arrests (for any offense). Further analysis revealed that participation in MnCoSA significantly reduced the chance (hazard ratio) of re-arrest by 62%, of technical violation revocations by 72%, and any re-incarceration by 84%. No significant reductions in the chance of reconviction or new offense re-incarcerations were reported.

A 2014 retrospective cohort study compared 71 Core Members from the U.K. with 71 matched controls. The study found evidence of statistical differences between Core Member and control groups, with Core Members reoffending at a rate one-quarter of that of the comparison group for sexual and violent offenses combined.

The Vermont Department of Corrections, Agency of Human Services, has released a qualitative report on the Circles of Support and Accountability program used as part of their re-entry services. This report does not specifically address recidivism numbers but does look at the efforts of the professional staff and volunteers in terms of effectiveness of outreach.

== Criticisms of effectiveness ==
Although highly supportive of the program model, a 2013 report into the implementation of Circles of Support and Accountability in the United States included a critical analysis of the effectiveness of Circles of Support and Accountability and its characterization as an example of evidence-based practice.

An academic review following that report highlighted a number of methodological limitations in the prior studies, which included:

- That the assumptions of the chi-squared test used to analyze the reductions in recidivism in the 2009 Canadian study were compromised. Correcting that statistical error produces a non-significant finding. The only reduction in reoffending that should be reported as statistically-significant in that study is the smaller-sample 3-year fixed-comparison analysis between 18 CoSA participants and 17 non-CoSA controls.
- That statistical analysis of the reductions in sexual recidivism reported in a 2014 study of UK Circles also produces non-significant results. Significant reductions are only found when sexual and non-sexual reoffending are grouped together.
- That both the selection criteria and the retrospective matching of groups in the cohort studies (e.g., the 2009 Canadian study and the 2014 UK study) are poorly-reported and inconsistent.
- That the exclusion of Core Members who have not received at least a 90-day dose of CoSA is methodologically questionable for a re-entry program that is aimed at offenders with the highest levels of risk of recidivism. Furthermore, the 2014 UK study reports this criterion as being “in accordance with previous international Circles research” (p. 868) citing the two Canadian studies. Neither study, however, appears to mention this criterion in their methods. None of the studies state whether or not (or how) such a criterion was also applied to their control group.
- That the randomized controlled trial of the Minnesota Department of Corrections CoSA program - a rigorous and methodologically-sound evaluation - found no significant reductions in the chance of reconviction or new offense re-incarcerations. It found significant reductions in chance of rearrest, technical violations, and re-incarceration; however, all of these outcomes could be the result of non-sexual offences or technical violations of probation or parole conditions.
- That, given recent analyses of “near significant” statistical results, the implication that findings in previous studies are simply a consequence of low sample size is debatable.

The report authors conclude that, “[given] the varying quality of the previous outcome studies in terms of retroactive matching of experimental and control samples, imperfect methods for matching, the integrity of statistical analyses, and the lack of statistically significant experimental results, it could be argued that at this time there is not enough evidence to claim that CoSA is proven to be effective in its programmatic aims.” (p. 116). In mitigation, the authors acknowledge that the previous findings are promising and note the difficulty in evaluating a program like CoSA on recidivistic outcomes alone and call for more rigorous evaluation methods that more adequately and fairly test the programmatic aims of Circles of Support and Accountability.

== In film ==
Filmmaker Bess O'Brien's 2018 documentary, Coming Home, focuses on five Vermonters returning to their communities after incarceration, each of whom who enter a CoSA seeking support. The film explores the lives of both the offenders and the volunteers who work with them. The film was featured on Vermont Public Radio and largely screened locally.

== See also ==
- Association for the Treatment and Prevention of Sexual Abuse
- Prevention Project Dunkelfeld – German clinical support service for individuals who are sexually attracted to children.
- Restorative justice
- Sexual offender
