= Leonore Tiefer =

American psychologist (born 1944)

- Born: February 5, 1944; New York City, US
- Education: University of California, Berkeley (BA, PhD)
- Known for: Sexologist, Clinical Psychologist, expert on Women and Gender
- Website: http://www.leonoretiefer.com

Leonore Tiefer (born February 5, 1944) is an American educator, researcher, therapist, and activist specializing in sexuality, and is a public critic of disease mongering as it applies to sexual life and problems.

== Early years ==
Leonore Tiefer was born in New York city and brought up in the Bronx, a borough of New York. Tiefer's mother, Rosalind Crost, of Dutch Jewish Sephardic heritage, was a gifted musician who performed widely. Her instrument was the piano. She was so versatile that she also excelled at the clarinet and the cello and her performances as the only woman with Simon Bellison's Clarinet Ensemble were much praised. Her father, Abraham David Tiefer, of Austro-Hungarian Ashkenazi heritage, worked for the Board of Health.

== Education and career ==
She attended Hunter College High School, graduating in 1961. Afterwards, she attended City College of New York (1961-1963) as well as the University of California, Berkeley for her B.A., receiving as well her Ph.D. at the university. Her thesis was on Experimental Psychology involving the role of hormones on hamsters (1969). She then held an academic position in physiological psychology at Colorado State University (1969-1977).

Responding to the challenge of the feminist movement, she left Colorado and returned to her home state of New York, where her career in New York City sexology included positions at Downstate Medical Center (1977-1983), Beth Israel Medical Center (1983-1988), and Montefiore Medical Center (1988-1996). Fifteen years after her Ph.D. she returned to graduate school to respecialize as a clinical psychologist with a focus on human sexuality. She completed an American Psychological Association (APA)-approved postdoctoral respecialization in clinical psychology at New York University in 1988 with a focus on sex and gender problems. While at Montefiore, she held an appointment with the Albert Einstein College of Medicine. Tiefer was also a clinical associate professor of psychiatry at the NYU School of Medicine from 1981 to 2017.

Tiefer has held professional offices within both sexological and feminist organizations. From 1983 to 1986 she was the National Coordinator of the Association for Women in Psychology (AWP). She later wrote the history of that group from 1969 to 2009. She was elected president of the International Academy of Sex Research (IASR) in 1993, and also served as the IASR representative at the first International Consultation on Erectile Dysfunction in 1999. From 2001 to 2002, Tiefer was on the board of directors of the International Society for the Study of Women's Sexual Health (ISSWSH), then called the Female Sexual Function Forum. She has reviewed small grants for the National Institute of Mental Health (NIMH) and in 1992, she was an invited speaker at the only National Institutes of Health (NIH) Consensus Development Conference ever held on a sexual topic: impotence. Tiefer was also vice-chair of the board of directors of the National Coalition Against Censorship during the 1990s-2000s.

Tiefer also has held a variety of editorial positions with professional psychology and sexology journals. She has been a book review editor for numerous scholarly publications and an associate editor for the Journal of Sex Research from 1992 to 1996. She has been a consulting editor for various journals since 1975. She continues this work to today.

== Feminist activism ==
=== Academic activism ===
In 1972, while working at Colorado State University (CSU) in Fort Collins, Tiefer co-founded the local National Organization for Women (NOW) chapter and the CSU Commission on the Status of Women (CSUCSW). The CSUCSW invited Gloria Steinem and Ms. Magazine editors to speak at the university on the “myths of feminism” in 1973, and later that same year, Tiefer helped form the CSU Faculty Women's Caucus. The following year, Tiefer taught an experimental course called “Human Sexuality,” the first on that topic at the university, which was taught from a "non-sexist point of view."

=== Anti-rape activism ===
After returning to New York City in 1977, Tiefer became active in the anti-rape movement, which had begun in the 1970s with speakouts, publications, and community organizing by groups such as New York Women Against Rape. The movement largely focused on "…law enforcement behavior and legal changes, hospital practices and counseling, self-defense and community education."

The New York City Mayor's Task Force on Rape was established in 1973, and opened four borough-wide rape crisis centers in 1977 (the group later changed its name to the New York City Advisory Task Force on Rape in 1980). Tiefer joined the group in 1977, and was co-chair from 1980 to 1982. Tiefer also joined the Psychiatry Department at Downstate Medical Center (DMC) in 1977 and co-founded the Rape Crisis Elective for Medical Students. This service has now evolved into a program out of the DMC Emergency Medicine Department.

=== Activism on DSM Diagnoses ===
As part of her activities as National Coordinator of the Association for Women in Psychology (1983-1986), Tiefer co-organized a demonstration at the 1985 meeting of the American Psychiatric Association to protest the addition of "anti-feminist" diagnoses such as "paraphilic rape disorder" and “self-defeating personality disorder” to the DSM-III-R. This focus on norms continued with her work on Female Sexual Dysfunction nomenclature.

=== Activism on sex research and women ===
Tiefer co-founded the World Research Network on the Sexuality of Women & Girls (WRNSWG) in 1991. She edited its newsletter from 1991 to 1999, and organized 4 of the 5 WRNSWG conferences, which were timed to precede the annual International Academy of Sex Research meetings in Provincetown (1995), Amsterdam (1996), Baton Rouge (1997), and New York City (1999). Other notable feminists involved with WRNSWG include Dutch sexologist Ellen Laan.

=== New View Campaign ===
In a society where it's your fault if you don't get sex right, and you have to have a lot of it and you have to do it right but nobody teaches you how ... you're looking for a way to excuse yourself from your problems, and biology offers that excuse."

Since 1999, Tiefer has condemned the push for "Pink Viagra" by pharmaceutical companies. In doing so, she uniquely paired activism with research and scholarship to create the New View Campaign, which organized against the harmful medicalization of women's sexuality, including female sexual dysfunction, and female genital cosmetic surgery.

Tiefer started the New View Campaign in 2000 as an educational project to create a new model of women's sexual health. According to the campaign's website, "Our goal was to expose the deceptions and consequences of industry involvement in sex research, professional sex education, and sexual treatments, and to generate conceptual and practical alternatives to the prevailing medical model of sexuality." The campaign began with a collaboratively written and vetted manifesto that has been translated in 8 languages and published in many sexology textbooks. Besides that, Erwin Haeberle put her summary of the founding of the New View Campaign (2000) into his "sexarchive".

In 2001, Tiefer co-edited a feminist sexology collection, A New View of Women's Sexual Problems, which grew out of the campaign. Her 2003 teaching manual is available on the New View Campaign website. The New View Campaign has held 5 scholar-activist conferences, testified before the Food and Drug Administration (FDA), provided fact sheets and briefings for media, and generated articles and chapters that are influencing the way students and professionals are taught about human sexuality. Tiefer used her experience as a clinical psychologist, sexologist, and feminist activist to critique, resist, and transform medical models of sexual health and dysfunction. Her intergenerational campaign used a range of tactics, including scholarly publications, lobbying, and social media.

For years, the New View Campaign challenged FDA approval of Intrinsa (2004) and Flibanserin (2010, 2015) for women's hypoactive sexual desire and female sexual dysfunction. With petition work, mainstream interviews and debates, public actions, and presentations at FDA hearings, Tiefer and the New View Campaign challenged the highly deceptive pharmaceutical public relations campaigns in 2010, and 2015 that pressured the FDA to approve Flibanserin. This effort spanned twelve years, from 2003 to 2015.

In 2008, the New View Campaign expanded its work to examine female genital cosmetic surgery. At the same time, Tiefer expanded her activism from focusing exclusively on the medicalization of sex to a larger perspective on overtreatment and overdiagnosis. In doing so, she co-organized the successful conference “Selling Sickness: People Before Profits,” in 2013 in Washington, D.C.

In October, 2016, Tiefer concluded the New View Campaign with a final Capstone Conference in Bloomington, Indiana, the home of the Kinsey Institute for Research in Sex, Gender, and Reproduction. A video about the conference was uploaded in 2017.

=== Activism on female genital cosmetic surgery ===
For Tiefer, female Genital Cosmetic surgery is harmful. As she says:

"[It promotes] “a very narrow definition of what women's genitals ought to look like — even for those women who don't want surgery, it harms them."

It began in 2008 with a street demonstration and scholarly paper, followed in 2009 by an arts and crafts exhibit and political event in Brooklyn, NY called "Vulvagraphics:An Intervention in Honor Of Female Genital Diversity". In 2010, New View organized a conference in Las Vegas called "Framing the Vulva" which included activism titled “Talking back to Cosmetic Genital Surgeons”. In 2011, the New View Campaign organized a series of activist events called "Vulvanomics" with an online-petition, and a one-day “Flash Activism” event of community-based photography of FGCS surgeon's offices. The 2011 also featured a 10-minute satirical video called Dr. Vajayjay's! Privatize Those Privates!

== Other activities ==
In conjunction with her anti-medicalization scholarship and activism, Tiefer was interviewed by The New York Times, The Washington Post, The Nation and other newspapers and magazines. She has appeared on numerous networks, such as the CBC and many other electronic media. There is also a film titled Orgasm Inc. (2010) which features her work.

Tiefer is also a public speaker, having been invited to keynote conferences nationally and internationally, such as one in Ljubljana. She has given provocative grand rounds in psychiatry, urology, and obstetrics & gynecology at medical centers, universities, and public audiences. In 2003, she was a platform speaker at the Chautauqua Institution. Tiefer also has a private practice in Manhattan which she began in 1996.

== Publications ==
She is the author of several books including Human Sexuality: Feelings and Functions (1979). Her book Sex is Not a Natural Act and Other Essays (1995), reviewed favorably by critics, is now in its 2nd edition (2004). Her book reviews have appeared in numerous publications, and her coauthored op-eds have been published in the Los Angeles Times, among others.

=== Popular writings ===
Beginning with a 1976 essay in Redbook, Tiefer has dabbled in popular news and magazine writing. Most notably, she wrote a weekly column in the New York Daily News from 1980 to 1981, some sections of which are reprinted in the first edition of her book Sex is Not a Natural Act and Other Essays.

Tiefer authored monthly sex advice columns in Playgirl Advisor (1976-1977) and Playgirl (1977). Her writing also appeared in Prime Time Magazine (1981), and she was profiled in Ms. Magazine in 1999. In 1994, Tiefer and Carol Tavris wrote a humorous column for the New York Times Book Review that was reprinted in the L.A. Times.

== Awards and memberships ==
She received the Alfred C. Kinsey Award (1994), the Distinguished Lifetime Scientific Achievement Award from the Society for the Scientific Study of Sexuality (2004) and the Lifetime Career Award from the Association for Women in Psychology (2004). She also served as vice chair of the board of directors of the National Coalition Against Censorship and on the steering committee of the Shelter for Homeless Men at the Community Church of New York - Unitarian-Universalist. She is an elected Fellow of the Society for the Scientific Study of Sexuality.

== Legacy ==
The "Leonore Tiefer Collection, 1948-Present", consisting of over 900 monographs as well as other materials is held in the Archives of Indiana University, Bloomington and The Kinsey Institute for Research in Sex, Gender and Reproduction.
