= Petr Skrabanek =

Czech-Irish physician

- Petr Škrabánek
- Born: 27 October 1940; Náchod, Protectorate of Bohemia and Moravia
- Died: 21 June 1994 (aged 53); Dublin, Ireland
- Education: Charles University
- Known for: research into the neurotransmitter substance P scepticism in medicine study of Joyce's Finnegans Wake
- Spouse: Věra Čapková
- Awards: 2018 Stearne medal (Royal College of Physicians of Ireland)
- Scientific career
- Fields: Toxicology; Neuroendocrinology
- Workplaces: Charles University; Jervis Street Hospital; Mater Misericordiae University Hospital; Trinity College Dublin
- Thesis: Inappropriate production of hormonal peptides in neoplasia (1979)

Petr Skrabanek (Czech: Petr Škrabánek; 27 October 1940 – 21 June 1994) was a Czech-Irish physician, professor of medicine and author of several books and many articles. Skrabanek was described by Ben Goldacre as "a lifelong champion of clear thinking, scepticism, and critical appraisal", and expressed vocal criticism of what he dubbed "cacademics", "quackupuncturists" and "nonsensus-consensus". Skrabanek was a polymath, loving jazz, history, literature and playing the piano. He spoke several languages thanks to which he was able to deeply study Joyce's last work - the avant-garde novel Finnegans Wake.

== Career ==
Skrabanek studied chemistry, joining the faculty of Natural Sciences at Charles University in Prague in 1957. Following his studies he was a researcher at the Institute for Toxicology and Forensic Medicine in Prague, graduating in 1962. He also frequently contributed short articles to the Czechoslovak science journal Vesmír.

Beginning in 1963, Skrabanek studied medicine at the Jan Evangelista Purkyně University in Brno, and wrote abstracts from journals published in Slavonic languages for Chemical Abstracts. Later he worked as an expert in forensic toxicology in Prague. In 1967 Skrabanek was selected to spend a month in Galway Regional Hospital.

When the Soviets invaded Czechoslovakia in July 1968, he and his wife Věra Čapková were on holiday in Ireland and they remained there as emigrants. Soon after, he was admitted to the Royal College of Surgeons in Ireland to finish his medical studies, qualifying LAH in 1970. For the next four years he worked for the Medical Research Council laboratory and the department of internal medicine of Jervis Street Hospital. He left this post in 1975 to join the Endocrine oncology research team at the Mater Misericordiae University Hospital as a senior research fellow, and as a leading specialist, he became involved in research into the neurotransmitter substance P. At the same time he completed his doctoral thesis "Inappropriate Production of Hormonal Peptides in Neoplasia".

Starting in the late 1970s, Skrabanek dealt with wider medical questions of medicine. He wrote more than 300 articles, at first purely professional, but later he applied his broad knowledge towards commenting on current and general issues of medicine and science. He soon became a member of the Lancet Editorial Board and a valued, independent contributor. A number of his articles have been directed against mistakes and frauds in medicine and, above all, against charlatanism. In 1984, through Lancet, Skrabanek met his future colleague and collaborator James McCormick, who offered him a position at the Trinity College Dublin Department of Community Health with a grant from the Wellcome Foundation. Skrabanek later became a professor there, specializing in neuroendocrinology. From this position he "immediately began to establish his position as an original, cogent, and fearless critic, particularly in relation to preventive medicine."While at Trinity, Skrabanek said "One of my duties is to protect people against the harm that over-enthusiastic doctors and misguided politicians can inflict upon them."

Skrabanek maintained his reputation as a stringent and scathing critic of dogmas, sham, and wishful thinking pertaining to the areas of preventive medicine and alternative medicine.

In 1991, Skrabanek became a Fellow of Trinity College and the Royal College of Physicians of Ireland.

in 2018, he became the seventh recipient of the Stearne medal, awarded by the Royal College of Physicians of Ireland to "persons of distinction who have made a contribution to medicine in Ireland".

== Major works ==
=== Follies and Fallacies in Medicine ===
The collection which we have compiled may give the false impression that doctors are at best charlatans and at worst rogues, and that medicine is itself a major threat to health. Medicine only becomes a threat to health if it remains untempered by the use of rational inquiry and criticism. Such criticism is an important and relatively neglected task.

Skrabanek's first book, which was co-authored by J. MacCormick, entitled "Follies and Fallacies in Medicine", was published in 1989. It had a broad response and was promptly translated into Danish, German, Spanish, Italian, French, Dutch and Czech, and is on the reading list of medical schools around the world, to encourage an appropriate skepticism about medical dogma. It was a critique against mistakes, delusions, myths and frauds in medicine and healing.
The first chapter emphasizes the role of placebo as a little emphasized, but crucial element in medicine and healing. The importance of placebo is illustrated by numerous examples. In the second chapter, there are almost thirty different delusions and temptations, to which a doctor can succumb as a scientist and practitioner. A provocative chapter is one on prevention, the importance of which Skrabanek partly questions as he highlights possible risks. Another chapter is about alternative medicine, the validity of which he clearly rejects without tolerance or attempted reconciliation:

=== The Death of Humane Medicine ===
The pursuit of health is a symptom of unhealth. When this pursuit is no longer a personal yearning but part of state ideology, healthism for short, it becomes a symptom of political sickness.

Even more controversial than Follies and Fallacies in Medicine is his last book, "The Death of Humane Medicine", subtitled "and the rise of coercive healthism". This was published in 1994, a year after Skrabanek's death, and had mixed reception; there was admiration and approval, but also sharp disagreement and resistance. In the book, Skrabanek comments on the current change in the understanding of medicine advocated by American and English medical societies and their governments. He says that the goal was no longer to help sick individuals, but to have a positive influence on the entire population. He writes that health ceases to be private and individual, instead becoming a moral duty, a new religion with priests and dogmas. Skrabanek also says that the state tries to interfere with the way of life, even against the wishes and interest of citizens. Skrabanek criticizes what he sees as the obsession with super-health, maximum prolongation of life, healthism and lifestylism, but especially with the coercion of the citizens to achieve these ideals. He disagrees with prohibitions of all kinds, with the fight against tobacco, obesity, alcohol consumption, and, on the contrary, the promotion of jogging and yogurt. Skrabanek goes so far as to see in this policy the continuation of the health policy of fascist Germany, and the totalitarian tendencies in the health of the Communist states,and says "The pursuit of health is a symptom of unhealth. When this pursuit is no longer a personal yearning but part of state ideology, healthism for short, it becomes a symptom of political sickness." Skrabanek also relies on his criticism of the evidence that most of the preventive and screening actions are less effective, scientifically unsubstantiated, and are often only a manifestation of the desire of bureaucracy for power and the efforts of pharmaceutical companies to increase profits. He also points out the huge and ineffective cost of such actions.

=== Night Joyce of a Thousand Tiers ===
Other doctors have golf, I have the Wake.

Skrabanek was deeply interested in languages. He learned several major European languages during his student years, and was private pupil of rabbi Richard Feder in Brno and learned Hebrew. While in Ireland he became interested in the Irish language and also Hiberno-English. He also learned Japanese.

Skabanek began to systematically devote himself to Joyce's Finnegans Wake in the early 1970s. While in Czechoslovakia, he became acquainted with the early Czech translations of Dubliners (1933), A Portrait of the Artist as a Young Man (1930) and Ulysses (1930). Skrabanek and his wife Věra decided to improve their basic knowledge of English by reading each day to each other several pages of Ulysses.

Skrabanek's first encounter with Finnegans Wake was through an excerpt of the Anna Livia Plurabella section translated into Czech by Zdeněk Urbánek in 1966. He wrote his first article on Joyce in A Wake Newslitter in 1971. More articles followed, and Skrabanek became respected as an authority on Finnegans Wake. In the 1980s he began to hold seminars about Joyce's riddling text at University College Dublin. He focused mainly on the analysis of Joyce's work language components: his main contribution to the study of Joyce's literary experiment is the extensive dictionary of expressions taken from Slavic languages, but he also published articles about the use of Hebrew, Armenian, Japanese, Afar, and Irish English in Finnegans Wake.

The article "Slavonicisms in Finnegans Wake" was originally published in Irish-Slavonic Studies. It was also reprinted in Litteraria Pragensia in the original English version. Skrabanek's contribution to the identification of Slavonicisms in the Wake cannot be overestimated. During the compilation of his Slavonic index, he was able to locate the elements from Russian, Ukrainian, Polish, Czech, Slovak, Serbo-Croatian, Slovenian and Bulgarian language. Collected articles about Finnegans Wake has been published under the title "Night Joyce of a Thousand Tiers: Petr Skrabanek Studies in Finnegans Wake".

== Response ==
Three years after his death, the Skrabanek Foundation was established by his wife, friends and associates. Vera Capkova Skrabanek and James McCormick were company directors. The goal of the foundation was to provide a forum concerning general issues of medicine and ethics, along the lines of skeptical inquiry. The first interdisciplinary symposium held by the Foundation was held in May 1995 in Dublin. The foundation was dissolved in May 2005.

Skrabanek was accused by the press of having been in the pay of the tobacco industry. The Guardian publicised the name of Skrabanek as “paid stooge”. Professor McCormick said: "I have never had a cheque from Philip Morris ... Petr may have done. I don't know if he did. We both knew there were people in the tobacco industry and elsewhere who thought our views were less inimical to their products than others." Robin Fox, editor of the Lancet from 1990 to 1995, said the journal was unaware that he was a consultant to a tobacco company. These claims received further coverage by New Scientist and in the BMJ.

The Irish Medical Times wrote, "His several hundred publications demonstrated his breadth of scholarship and ability to communicate with learned and popular publications in a number of languages... As a teacher Professor Skrabanek is irreplaceable."

Regarding Skrabanek's work, the British Medical Journal stated "With the spirit of European iconoclasm he kept the medical evangelists in their hot boxes... He was a good scientist, as his work on substance P testifies, but this was not to be his métier. Rather he chose to take the broader intellectual view of a profession in disarray, a profession in need of careful watching."

"James McCormick and Prof Petr Skrabanek were internationally known as the bête-noires of establishment medicine; their book Follies and Fallacies in Medicine is one I find myself returning to again and again." said Muiris Houston, consultant in Medical Education at The Galway Clinic and award-winning medical journalist and health analyst with The Irish Times.

At the time of his death The Times explained, "From his base at Trinity College, Dublin a stream of scientific papers and articles exposed the claims of public health doctors, epidemiologists, dietary evangelists and others that many diseases were preventable."

In 2005, the president of the Dutch anti-quackery organisation Vereniging tegen de Kwakzalverij, Cees Renkens, wrote that Skrabanek was one of the first to warn for the dangers of 'randomised clinical trials of absurd claims' and pleaded for the 'demarcation of the absurd'.

== Selected bibliography ==
- The Death of Humane Medicine and the Rise of Coercive Healthism (1994)
- Follies and Fallacies in Medicine.] (1998)
- False premises false promises (2000)
- Night Joyce of a Thousand Tiers: Petr Skrabanek Studies in Finnegans Wake (2007)
- Who Needs WHO?: Three Views on the World Health Organization's Dietary Guidelines (Research Reports) (1995)
- Slavanic Slavar (Slavonic Dictionary) (1972)

== See also ==
- Disease mongering
- False positive
- Gold effect
- Medicalization
- Overdiagnosis
- Schooliosis
