= Medicalisation of sexuality =

Medical authority over sexual experiences

The medicalisation of sexuality is the existence and growth of medical authority over sexual experiences and sensations. The medicalisation of sexuality is contributed to by the pharmaceutical industry, along with psychiatry, psychology (particularly evolutionary psychology), and biomedical sciences more generally.

Medicalisation is defined as a process of conceptualizing, defining, and treating nonmedical issues as medical problems. Human sexual activity is affected by many factors, including social norms, sexual identity and gender identity, and relationship structures. Sexuality is the way people experience and express themselves sexually. Much research in psychology and psychiatry has been devoted to understanding factors contributing to human sexuality, often playing a gatekeeping or legislative role in stigmatising certain behavior or promoting disease mongering. The medicalisation of sexuality has also been used to advance the pharmaceutical industry through treatments for erectile dysfunction and female sexual dysfunction. Another key influence of the medicalisation of sexuality is social control, mass surveillance and regulation related to risk profiling for medicalised sexual disorders.

While the additional funding from the pharmaceutical industry has been viewed as beneficial to medical research and practice in sexology and human physiology, there exists significant criticism of the medicalisation of sexuality, often on the grounds that it neglects sociocultural factors in favour of a profit motive. The medicalisation of sexuality has also historically been used to justify medical treatments, stigmatisation and incarceration of gay and lesbian people (generally known at the time as homosexual), intersex people and transgender people.

== Medicalisation ==
Medicalisation describes the processes through which initially nonmedical problems such as social problems or natural processes become defined and understood in medical terms of illness, disorder, and disease, which is coupled with treatments. Medicalisation involves a combination of specialised language, explanations and treatments which are promoted at the expense of social language and explanations.

It is believed that the concept of medicalisation began with late 18th-century Age of Enlightenment philosophy, one of the first developments of pathologisation in Western society, including but not limited to sexuality. The three hallmarks of medicalisation are mind-body dualism, individualism and naturalism. Medicalisation has been attributed with humanising areas of social deviance, such as alcohol intoxication, insanity and rebelliousness previously only subject to cruelty or censorship. Medicalisation also has the potential to lend credibility to less socially acceptable illnesses; medical sanctioning of trauma, autism and chronic fatigue for example has been argued to in some cases improve quality of life. Regarding harmful effects, medicalisation can be used as a form of social control, and the diagnosis of various disorders such as female infertility or schizophrenia typically result in social stigma.

=== Individualism ===
Individualism in medicalisation states that as diseases are in individuals, individual solutions are required for treatment. In one description from 1994, "the body-centered, body-limited medical model has been and remains today the defining paradigm for our professional and philosophical conceptions of health". Individualism is practised extensively in biomedicine and psychiatry, and this has been articulated as an obstacle to activism for sexual rights.

=== Naturalism ===
Naturalism, closely related to evolutionary psychology, posits that human health, and sexuality more specifically, is a "transhistorical product of mammalian evolution" and that this lends significant uniformities across the sexualities of different species. Some initial research of sexuality in the 1920s studied animals intentionally to avoid ridicule by discussing human sexuality in public discourse, but most research related to naturalism applied to human sexuality occurred in the 1980s.

=== Derivative terms ===
The term biomedicalisation was proposed in 2010 to describe a significant change in medicalisation in the United States focussed on using technology to identify and surveil health risks in individuals and populations. The term neomedicalization was also proposed independently in 2010 to describe corporate efforts to commercialise health risks for disease as a market for new drugs and technologies that purport to help manage these risks. The original authors of the theory argue that this strategy by pharmaceutical companies is reflective of neoliberalism as a political ideology, emphasising individualism and surveillance, especially self-surveillance through the use of marketed products.

The term sexuopharmaceuticals has been used to describe the category of medicalised pharmaceutical products for sexual disorders such as Viagra. The term sexuomedicine has also been used as an alternative term to refer to the medicalisation of sexuality as a field in itself.

== History ==
=== 18th and 19th centuries ===
The tradition of representing illness as a punishment for sin has existed in Western culture since at least the Age of Enlightenment in the 18th century. The late 18th century marked the first attempts at artificial insemination of women using syringes, along with newly developed cultural views which undermined the value of female sexual pleasure as it was believed unnecessary in procreation.

In the 19th century this concept of illness as punishment for sin was medicalised into associating so-called perverted sexual traits and behaviors, such as masturbation, with increased morbidity. This was described by a symptom called spermatorrhoea invented by William Acton in 1857, at the time used as a medical justification of celibacy. Spermatorrhoea was later sub-classified into other symptom clusters based partially on how it affected semen. Treatment for spermatorrhoea at the time included catheterisation, cauterisation, circumcision, and sticking needles through the perineum into the prostate. In the 19th and early 20th centuries, the cultural stigma towards researching sexuality drove its unpopularity among doctors and in publications. The first recognition the symptoms described in spermatorrhoea as a disorder in itself is believed to be in 1883, termed ejaculatio praecox.

Other researchers of sexuality in the 19th and early 20th centuries included Havelock Ellis, Edward Carpenter, Marie Stopes and Alfred Kinsey, of which only Ellis had medical qualifications. In the 1920s and 30s, significant research was done into unsuccessfully finding physical causes of sexual dysfunction.

=== 20th century ===
The "unnatural acts" initially treated as sins in the religious context were transformed into crimes or offences in the judicial context, and then, more recently, into diseases to be treated in the medical register, before leaving the field of pathology and being constructed as a form of social identity and participation in a "community"

— Alain Giami, Medicalization of Sexuality and Trans Situations: Evolutions and Transformations

The origin of the modern version of ejaculatio praecox, called premature ejaculation, is thought to have begun with Alfred Adler before major developments of psychoanalytic theory. Similar to spermatorrhoea, Adler strongly advocated celibacy for women as he thought this would improve sexual satisfaction for women during penetrative sex, a theory later found to be fictitious.

Through the mid-20th century, Sigmund Freud published widely accepted and virtually unchallenged theories that penetrative sex was the only right way to achieve female orgasm, and that a man's erection was essential to female orgasm. This so-called coital imperative has later been argued as a medically recognised disorder that did not actually serve the satisfaction of women but rather contributed to the pressure on and pathologisation of men in obtaining a so-called optimal time to ejaculation.

The first major publication articulating a broad medicalisation of sexuality was the first edition of the Diagnostic and Statistical Manual of Mental Disorders (DSM-1). Published in 1952, it reframed behaviors previously viewed as immoral, such as masturbation, low sexual desire and homosexuality, as treatable; faults of character or morality were instead described as illnesses. Some treatments described in the DSM-1 included commitment to asylums, hormonal treatments, circumcision and castration. A cornerstone in the development of psychiatry, the DSM was highly influential and motivated significant eugenic research in a search for naturalistic, biological causes of sexually deviant behaviors, such as the so-called gay gene. By the 1950s, homosexuality was indisputably classified as a mental disorder in psychiatry. In the early 20th century, medical folklore held that 90-95% of cases of erectile dysfunction were psychological in origin, but around the 1980s research took the opposite direction of searching for physical causes of sexual dysfunction, much like the 1920s and 30s. Physical causes as explanations continue to dominate literature when compared with psychological explanations as of 2022. Treatments in the 80s for erectile dysfunction included penile implants and intracavernosal injections.

Male impotence, similar in meaning to the modern term of erectile dysfunction, was initially advanced by the discovery of papaverine in the 1980s by urologist Ronald Virag. Although referring to the same symptoms, impotence was considered to have psychogenic causes, whereas erectile dysfunction was considered to have organic causes. The use of medicalised diagnosis criteria also allows clinicians to inflate prevalence by using survey results and/or measuring the frequency of low severity cases; in one controversial case, a 1999 report claimed that 43% of all women have a sexual disorder. The use of the biopsychosocial model and 'weak sciences' like social science to explain human behavior lost significant popularity in 1960s and 1970s against 'hard sciences' like biomedicine, which can be attributed to a combination of deregulation and market factors pressuring economic growth in the political climate of the United States at the time.

=== Viagra ===
In 1998, Viagra was first introduced to the world, and it is fair to say that the world has not been the same since. The impact of this medication has been enormous, not just in the narrow area of treating erectile dysfunction (ED) for which it was approved, but also in the way we think of sex and sexuality, and even in the realm of relationships between men and women.

— Abraham Morgentaler, The Viagra Myth

Academic consensus is that the main pharmaceutical product contributing to medicalisation of sexuality was sildenafil sold by Pfizer under the trade name Viagra approved in 1998, the first phosphodiesterase-5 inhibitor (see phosphodiesterase inhibitor) which became an instant bestseller for treating erectile dysfunction and largely replaced selective serotonin reuptake inhibitor (SSRI) treatments for sexual disorders. It was reportedly the fastest selling drug in history, outselling the most common pharmaceutical at the time, the SSRI fluexetine sold under the trade name Prozac. The economic success of Viagra motivated research for similar products.

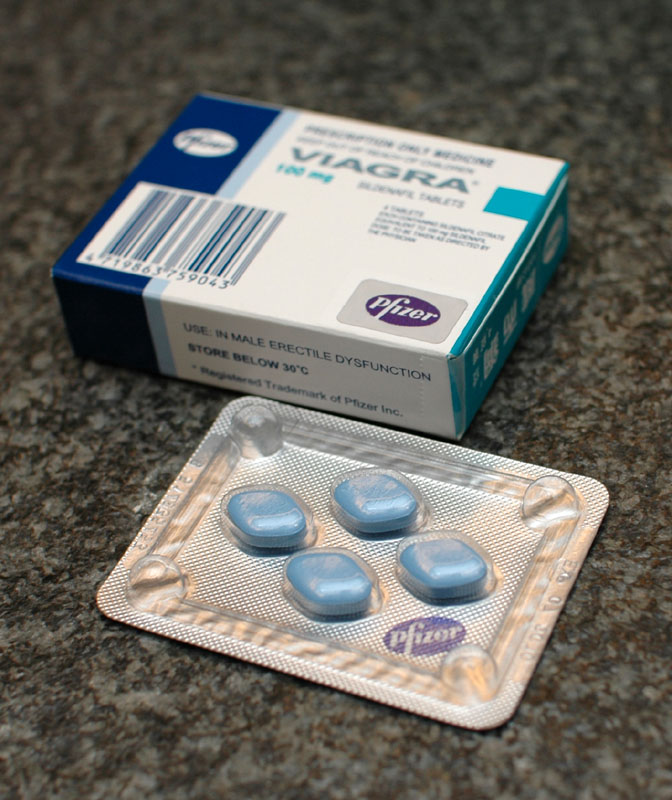
A package containing Viagra (sildenafil). At the time of its release in 1998, it was the world's best selling pharmaceutical.

Public funding for sex research was decreasing during the 1990s and 2000s when corporate funding shifted the focus from nonmedical sexology and sex therapy research, to clinical trials and emphasising the concept of sexual dysfunction under a simplified epidemiological model. Viagra and other products for sexual dysfunction, termed sexuopharmaceuticals, proliferated new types of specialised marketing for such products based on neoliberal rhetoric framing viewers as "responsible informed, aspirational sexual subjects". Viagra and similar prescription pharmaceuticals were promoted by images in media to the extent of becoming a cultural icon, at the time a relatively new phenomenon known to be permitted only in the United States and New Zealand and which is believed to have significantly contributed to norms regarding male sexuality. One author notes that although the effect of Viagra is only limited to penile blood vessels, advertisements routinely use imagery of couples hugging, smiling and dancing, with the author claiming that pharmaceutical companies were deceptive in the use of such advertisements.

Criticism of this medicalisation of sexuality existed before the release of Viagra and followed in the 2010s, most vocally about female sexuality. A large criticism of the medicalisation of sexuality is that its tendency for biological reductionism generally fails to take into account sociocultural factors contributing to human sexuality. Around the time of this criticism, research increased into the topic of female sexual dysfunction (FSD). One prominent publication in 1999 purported that "female sexual dysfunction is age-related, progressive, and highly prevalent, affecting 30% to 50% of women", believed by a later 2012 publication to be the first complete articulation of FSD as a disorder.

In some ways, sexology and sexual physiology research fields benefited due to interest and funding from pharmaceutical companies, as this led to funding for research on psychological assessments for sexual health, and the promotion of evidence-based medicine in research and practice. The medicalisation of sexuality has also made access to sexological healthcare somewhat less stigmatised in developed countries, although this comes alongside social expectations regarding sexual performance, and age-based discrimination due to natural deterioration in sexual function. Study results also suggested that men are often reluctant to use SSRIs as treatment for erectile dysfunction and suggested a benefit from having alternative pharmaceutical treatment options.

=== Criminology ===
At this time in the late 1990s and early 2000s, psychiatry and sexology were also increasingly playing a role in processes for criminal justice and forensic science. This has included the use of sex offender registries, and having psychiatrists and psychologists assess individuals in court or prison for mental stability and chances of recidivism. These assessments in the United States and Britain carried significant weight as they could be used to indefinitely incarcerate individuals after their criminal term expired, if the expert believed reoffending was likely. Behavioral treatments for sex offenders around the 1990s onward have included aversion therapy, satiation therapy (intended to reduce arousal through overexposure to deviant fantasies) and cognitive behavioral therapy. Biomedical treatments included hormone suppressants such as medroxyprogesterone acetate (MPA) normally used for birth control, and leuprorelin, normally used as a cancer treatment. A 2015 study reported that although these treatments continued to be used, MPA was not cleared by the Food and Drug Administration for inducing impotence in males and evidence at the time for both behavioral and pharmaceutical treatments for sex offenders was weak.

=== Homosexuality ===
As 19th century Western culture shifted from religious to secular authority, homosexuality began to receive increased scrutiny from the law, medicine, and later psychiatry, sexology, and human rights activism. The term homosexuality was first used in a medical context in 1869 by Hungarian doctor Karl Maria Kertbeny, who argued against the harsh laws and punishments against sodomy in the Prussian legal code. He argued that it was inappropriate to treat homosexuality as a crime because, in his view, it was congenital (i.e. innate) rather than acquired; this is considered the first description of homosexuality as a medicalised disorder. Before the inclusion of homosexuality in the 1952 DSM-1 and later in the 1968 DSM-2 as a mental disorder, homosexuality was first classified as a "psychopathic personality" and "pathological sexuality" in the standard classified nomenclature of disease in 1935.

One of the most influential 19th century writers on medicalising homosexuality was Richard von Kraft-Ebbing in his book Psychopathia Sexualis. Kraft-Ebbing argued that homosexuality and other "sexual abnormalities" were innate, and therefore should be treated therapeutically rather than punitively. Sigmund Freud however described homosexuality as a natural sexual variation, and considered homoeroticism as part of a "normal" sexual development. In the 1940s, Freud's followers including Edmund Bergler, Irving Bieber, and Charles W. Socarides took another approach, re-establishing homosexuality as a psychiatric disorder with negative caricatures such as "megalomaniacal, with free floating malice, unreliability and superciliousness". They viewed homosexuality as a disease and perversion, and insisted that all homosexuals experience a deep sense of related guilt. Following this, a detailed description of homosexuality clearly identifying it as a medical disorder was included in the DSM-2 in 1968, replacing what was only a brief mention.

Medicalisation of homosexuality and its public visibility reached a peak in the 1950s and 1960s in the United States and, to a lesser extent, in the United Kingdom, with gay liberation movements in divisive political contest with psychiatrists and others in support of the medicalisation of homosexuality. Up until the 1970s, psychiatrists who disclosed they were homosexual were at risk of losing their job and having their medical license revoked. These protests are historically considered to have emerged in response to studies from Bieber in 1965 and, later, Socarides in 1972, which asserted the medical status of homosexuality as an abnormal disorder. Socarides' research was released under his newly-elected position as chair of the Task Force on Homosexuality appointed by the New York County branch of the American Psychiatric Association (APA).

One of the most influential protests occurred in 1972 when John E. Fryer, a psychiatrist recently fired due to the homosexual stigma, took the stage unannounced at an APA conference only as "Dr. H. Anonymous," a name later expanded to "Dr. Henry Anonymous." Fryer appeared on stage wearing a rubber joke-shop face mask – that sometimes was described as a mask of Richard M. Nixon, but which probably was altered from its original state. Fryer stated, "I am a homosexual. I am a psychiatrist", and then explained issues with the APA's medicalisation of homosexuality. Homosexuality was removed from the DSM in 1973, a year after Fryer's speech (Note: The designation homosexuality with sexual orientation disturbance remained in the Manual until finally removed in 1987.) – leading the now-defunct Philadelphia Bulletin to print the headline "Homosexuals gain instant cure" – and Fryer's speech has been cited as a key factor in persuading the psychiatric community to reach this decision.

Though the term "homosexuality" was removed from the DSM, the underlying condition was still pathologized. To appease both gay activists and advocates of homosexuality remaining a diagnosis, a disorder known as "sexual orientation disturbance" was introduced in a reprint of the DSM-2 to replace it. In 1980, the DSM-3 replaced SOD with "ego-dystonic sexual orientation" and reclassified it under a new category of "psychosexual disorders". The 1987 DSM-3-R omitted any direct substitution for homosexuality, replacing EDH with "sexual disorder not otherwise specified" which was defined by "marked distress about one's sexual orientation". This was later removed in the DSM-5 in 2013 without replacement.

Expressions of non-heterosexuality are now broadly considered to be normal variations of human sexuality, although continued discrimination results in worse mental health of this population. This continued high-level correlation between mental health problems and homosexuality continued to motivate medicalisation of homosexuality, such as in the American Counselling Association and Australian Psychological Society c. 2007.

=== Sexuality of transgender people ===
Beginning in the 1950s, clinicians and researchers developed a variety of classifications of transsexualism. These were variously based on sexual orientation, age of onset, and fetishism. Beginning with Harry Benjamin in the 1960s, transfeminine individuals' sexuality was medicalised and viewed as pathological, to the extent that the sexuality of transsexual individuals was considered a central factor in diagnosis. Initially, these classifications generally divided transgender women into two groups: "homosexual transsexuals" if sexually attracted to men and "heterosexual fetishistic transvestites" if sexually attracted to women.

In 1982, Kurt Freund further expanded this research based on sexual attraction. In the 1980s and 1990s, Ray Blanchard proposed a psychological typology of gender dysphoria, transsexualism, and fetishistic transvestism in a series of academic papers, and coined the term autogynephilia as part of the typology. These studies have been criticized as bad science for failing to sufficiently operationalize their definitions and as unfalsifiable. They have also been criticized for lacking reproducibility, and for a lack of a control group of cisgender women, while supporters of the typology denied these allegations.

Gender identity disorder (GID) and gender identity disorder of childhood (GIDC) were introduced in the DSM-3 in 1980. At the time during the internal drafting process, there was criticism from feminist members of the APA, who claimed that research on people assigned male at birth (AMAB) was inapplicable to those assigned female at birth (AFAB). In response to the critiques, different standards were established between AMAB and AFAB children, with AFAB children being excluded from being diagnosed with GIDC if they transitioned for the "perceived advantages" of being male. However, absent from the discussion was prior research indicating a relationship between gender nonconformity and homosexuality. Later investigation by Jem Tosh has shown that GIDC was based on research which worked under the assumption that treating gender nonconformity in feminine AMAB children would prevent them from becoming homosexuals as adults. This was desirable, as adult homosexuality was seen as more difficult to change. This line of reasoning, that gender nonconformity and homosexuality develop primarily in childhood, was proposed as a justification to allow parental intervention to force such treatments onto children. This has been described as a "recycling" of homosexuality into new medicalised disorders GID and GIDC; although the name and diagnostic criteria changed, the same gender nonconforming and homosexual behavior was medicalised in the process.

The groups responsible for revising gender identity disorders in the 10th edition of the International Classification of Diseases (ICD-10) and the DSM-4 into the DSM-5 have been noted to share the experts Jack Drescher and Peggy Cohen-Kettenis. Due to the ICD not being restricted to psychiatric disorders like the DSM, it has been argued that this ICD revision had the potential to demedicalise transsexualism by including it in a non-psychiatric category, which would still allow insurance provider coverage for treatments in healthcare systems. Instead, the World Health Organisation decided to create a new category for GID and related conditions called "conditions related to sexual health". Although distinct from psychiatric categories, it has been argued that this reclassification of transgender and gender diverse people into "sexual health" is counterproductive considering the questionable basis of establishing sexuality and paraphilias as causes of gender diversity.

A 2020 review found that most research has continued to study shifts in sexual desire or orgasmic potential before and after transgender health care, such as in penetrative sex, with an absence of studies focused on sexual pleasure. This bias in research has been argued to reinforce a narrow, medicalised model of sexuality on transgender people focussed on individual sex acts unrepresentative of the population being studied.

=== HIV ===
HIV prevention has been considered one of the major forms of medicalisation of sexuality in the 20th century, and as of 2017, medicalisation continues to be a dominant factor surrounding HIV. Chemoprevention, also known as chemoprophylaxis, is the use of medication to prevent a disease an individual does not have. As of 2023, chemoprevention remains a controversial for HIV prevention. In medical recommendations and policies, chemoprevention for HIV is generally believed to have replaced behavioral prevention strategies such as condom use and coitus interruptus in favour of medication use since the mid 2000s. This has been criticised for questionable efficacy and harmful side effects.

The medicalisation of HIV has resulted in social effects in addition to replacing prevention options. Rhetoric of harm prevention has largely been replaced with harm reduction (i.e. treatments which only reduce incidence rather than completely prevent it) is common in HIV research yet has been shown to produce misleading study results that do not generalise. The medicalisation of HIV has been argued to have a chilling effect on public discussion, which also increases stigma in those diagnosed. HIV chemoprevention has also been used to justify increased medical monitoring or policing of sexuality.

=== Intersex people ===
Medical surgery to normalise intersex bodies within a gender binary has been conducted since at least the 19th century, and has been influenced by both medicalisation of homosexuality and transsexuality. Such surgeries were justified arguing that such surgeries improve sexual functioning. Intersex people have also been routinely used as subjects for psychological experimentation to study sexuality since the mid-20th century.

=== Elderly ===
In the 19th and 20th centuries, it was commonly accepted for the elderly to become asexual. Until the 20th century, medical science often conflicted on this message as to whether a sexual life in old age was important, healthy or desirable. With the continued development of sexology, biomedicalisation and the pharmaceutical industry, this rhetoric shifted as the elderly became a medicalised market for sexual dysfunction products after the release of Viagra and similar pharmaceuticals.

== Criticism ==
In sexuomedicine, the amount of time devoted to getting the penis hard and the vagina wet vastly outweighs the attention devoted to assessment or education about sexual motives, scripts, pleasure, power, emotionality, sensuality, communication, or connectedness. Research produces more and more knowledge about the kneebone and the anklebone, while people remain stuck with only their popmagazine or commonsense knowledge of the effects on sexuality of psychology, social class, education, cultural pressures, and media. The consequence of this imbalanced research is a perpetually gullible, anxious, and exploitable public, the perfect market for selling magical drugs.

— Leonore Tiefer, A New View of Women's Sexual Problems: Why New? Why Now?

There are a wide range of criticisms of the medicalisation of sexuality. One of the most popular criticisms is that biological reductionism and other tenets of medicalisation, individualism and naturalism, generally fails to take into account sociocultural factors contributing to human sexuality. The medicalisation of sexuality has been criticised for being excessively narrow and serving a normative and gatekeeping role in sexual expression. The naturalistic tenet of the medicalisation of sexuality is argued to be a homogenising force, replacing or demoting the value of diversity in sexual cultures with uniform expectations of genital functioning. By comparison, after convening critical social scientists and clinicians and presenting the discussion at the Female Sexual Forum conference at Boston University, the author finds that sexual complaints by women are affected by a combination of "emotional, physical and relational factors" rather than just physical functioning.

In the 2010s, science and technology studies has been used to criticise the effects of medicalising sexuality, claiming that medical authority is unjustified in determining what is a respectable or mature sexuality. It has also been described as reinforcing masculine and heteromasculine norms including the British concepts of the New Man and lad culture.

The neoliberalism inherent in the medicalisation of sexuality has faced wide criticism. One author writes, "linking drugs with risk factors and lowering thresholds for 'at-risk' conditions pave the way for pharmaceutical expansion from disease to discomfort". Sexual disorders like erectile dysfunction have been used as an estimate of general patient health. For example, erectile dysfunction is often the first sign of arteriosclerosis due to restricted blood flow. While this is beneficial in that it improves detection of serious medical conditions, this kind of "penile health gauge" is argued to have a perverse incentive in which increasingly intrusive, and possibly even mandatory surveillance of patients is expected. Sexologists such as John Bancroft are highly critical of the medicalisation of sexuality.

Following the release and popularity of Viagra in 1998, a vocal criticism was the lack of equivalent focus on female sexuality. Similarly, research in HIV/AIDS has been criticised as a key force of medicalisation in forcing higher levels of patient surveillance. AIDS historian Sarah Schulman writes that women were routinely excluded from experimental drug trials for HIV. Another case study argued that even in large LGBT organisations in the United States with significant resources to conduct HIV/AIDS support such as Bienestar, medical models of sexuality and disease prevalence were routinely used to justify gender discrimination in employment (see gender inequality in the United States), and significantly disproportionate support for programs for gay men at the expense of programs for women.

In contrast with this reported lack of pharmaceutical research towards women in the late 1990s, a 2002 study argued that medically unnecessary genital modification was disproportionately targeted at women, especially in the United States, and that it reinforced harmful norms about the expectations of women's appearances and bodies. Quoting the authors, "by encouraging women to look like Playboy centrefolds and men to seek priapic perfection, we may be furthering what has been termed the 'tyranny of genital sexuality.'" One author writes in 2001 that the use of pharmaceuticals for sexual enhancement by men could arguably lead to a "comical infinite regress", since women partnered to such men were reporting complaints of genital irritation which could be reduced only if the women elect to use vaginal lubricants themselves. One author writes that for low female sexual desire specifically, it is considered a normal part of life, inherently sociocultural rather than medical and framing low female sexual desire as a disease is done in part to seek financial gain.
