= Melissa Hines =

American neuroscientist

- Born: Melissa Marie Hines; November 27, 1951 (age 74); Moline, Illinois, U.S.
- Education: UCLA (PhD), Princeton University (BA)
- Known for: Neuroscientist, Gender studies
- Spouse: Richard Green (m. 1994–2014; div.)
- Children: 1
- Scientific career
- Workplaces: University of Cambridge

Melissa Marie Hines (born November 27, 1951) is an American neuroscientist, psychobiologist, and professor at the University of Cambridge. She studies the development of gender, with particular focus on how the interaction of prenatal and postnatal experience shape brain development and behavior.

== Early life and education ==
Melissa Marie Hines was born on November 27, 1951, in Moline, Illinois. Her parents were Janice (née Sersig) and William Joseph Hines. She graduated from Georgetown Visitation Preparatory School in Washington, D.C.

Hines received a bachelor's degree in psychology from Princeton University. She was in the first group of women enrolled as undergraduates, which could have inspired an interest in gender. She received a PhD in 1981 in psychology from the University of California, Los Angeles. The focus of her thesis was the gender-related behaviour of women whose mothers had taken the synthetic oestrogen diethylstilbestrol during pregnancy.

== Research ==
Hines completed a postdoctoral fellowship in neuroendocrinology and neuroscience at the UCLA Brain Research Institute. She investigated hormonal influences on brain development in rodents there and at the University of Wisconsin, Madison where she was a visiting scientist. She received the Shephard Ivory Franz Award for Distinguished Teaching at UCLA. After her postdoctoral fellowship, she was appointed as an assistant and then associate professor at UCLA. During her time at UCLA she trained and was licensed as a clinical psychologist.

Hines moved to the UK and joined City University as a professor of psychology in 1996. She is a chartered counseling psychologist in the UK (British Psychological Society). In 2006 she joined the University of Cambridge, and Churchill College, Cambridge. She is director of the University of Cambridges's Gender Development Research Centre.

Her research focuses on the causes and consequences of sex/gender differences in human brain and behaviour. Based on findings that male and female vervet monkeys show toy preferences that resemble those seen in children, Hines and Alexander suggested that "sex differences in toy preferences can arise independent of the social and cognitive mechanisms thought by many to be the primary influences on toy preferences". Other research indicates that girls with high levels of testosterone are less interested in dolls, and more interested in toy vehicles, than are other girls. She has appeared on a discussion panel with autism researcher Simon Baron Cohen, who also is interested in hormonal influences on human gender development. Their results have, however, sometimes differed from one another's, with Hines' results showing an influence just for girls but Baron Cohen's showing an influence just for boys or for boys and girls taken together, and for some measures no difference for either sex.

== Public engagement ==
Hines was the President of the International Academy of Sex Research. She is the author of Brain Gender, published in 2005 by Oxford University Press.

She spoke at the Lucy Cavendish College, Cambridge "Women's Word" festival in 2011. In 2013 she appeared on BBC Radio 4 discussing the spat between Suzanne Moore and transgender rights activists. In 2014 she was an invited speaker at the Cambridge Science Festival. She is a writer for The Conversation.

== Personal life ==
Her partner starting in 1986, was Richard Green (1936–2019), a noted psychiatrist and sexologist; they married in 1994 and were divorced in 2014. Together they had one son.
