= Selling Sickness =

2005 book by Ray Moynihan and Alan Cassels

Selling Sickness: How the World's Biggest Pharmaceutical Companies are Turning us All into Patients
- Author: Ray Moynihan and Alan Cassels
- Subject: Unnecessary health care
- Publisher: Allen & Unwin (Australia); Nation Books (US)
- Publication date: 2005
- Publication place: United States
- Pages: 254
- ISBN: 978-1-56025-856-8
- OCLC: 60615329

Selling Sickness: How the World's Biggest Pharmaceutical Companies are Turning us All into Patients is a 2005 book by Ray Moynihan and Alan Cassels about unnecessary health care.

== Summary ==
The work discusses disease mongering. A summary in JAMA described the book as follows:

The book is organized as a series of case studies, each focused on a particular drug. Each chapter explores a different aspect of drug marketing, with evidence drawn from published editorials, news reports, academic journals, and, most interestingly, original interviews with physician-spokespersons and pharmaceutical sales experts.

== Reviews ==
Jennifer Barrett in Newsweek said that book was an examination of how the drug industry changed public perception of health care issues. A review for the Canadian Centre for Policy Alternatives said that the authors used "well-honed investigative skills" to "provide solid evidence for their claims". Another reviewer said that the book was a "spirited journalistic exposure of the methods used by the pharmaceutical industry to expand the market for its products" Cal Montgomery in Ragged Edge said that the book was " pitched for general audiences with no special training". The Consumers Health Forum of Australia review said that the book "presented convincing examples that support the idea that growing numbers of people are unnecessarily taking medicines." Judy Segal suggested in Canadian Journal for Studies in Discourse and Writing that the book was "a wonderful resource for teaching rhetoric of science"; she generally praised the journalistic approach, but noted that "one might wonder if the authors are sufficiently even-handed in their reporting".

== Selling Sickness documentary ==
A Selling Sickness documentary was made as a film companion to the book. Of the film, a reviewer said that "although its critical intent is apparent throughout, it provides a complex account."
