= Thomas Gold =

Austrian astrophysicist (1920–2004)

Thomas Gold FRS
- Born: May 22, 1920; Vienna, Austria
- Died: June 22, 2004 (aged 84); Ithaca, New York, U.S.
- Education: Trinity College, Cambridge
- Known for: Steady-state theory Pulsars; Abiogenic petroleum origin Deep hot biosphere Otoacoustic emission Nanoflare; Gold effect
- Awards: Fellow of the Royal Society (1964); John Frederick Lewis Award (1972); Humboldt Prize (1979); Gold Medal of the Royal Astronomical Society (1985)
- Scientific career
- Fields: Astrophysics, astronomy, biophysics, cosmology, geophysics, aerospace engineering
- Workplaces: University of Cambridge, Royal Observatory, Greenwich, Harvard University, Cornell University
- Doctoral advisor: R. J. Pumphrey
- Doctoral students: Stanton J. Peale; Peter Goldreich

Thomas Gold (May 22, 1920 – June 22, 2004) was an Austrian-born astrophysicist, who also held British and American citizenship. He was a professor of astronomy at Cornell University, a member of the U.S. National Academy of Sciences, and a Fellow of the Royal Society (London). Gold was one of three young Cambridge scientists who in 1948 proposed the now mostly abandoned "steady state" hypothesis of the universe. Gold's work crossed boundaries of academic and scientific disciplines, into biophysics, astronomy, aerospace engineering, and geophysics.

== Early life ==
Gold was born on May 22, 1920, in Vienna, Austria, to Max Gold, a wealthy Jewish industrialist (pre-war) who ran one of Austria's largest mining and metal fabrication companies, and German former actress Josefine Martin. Following the economic downfall of the European mining industry in the late 1920s, Max Gold moved his family to Berlin, where he had taken a job as director of a metal trading company. Following the start of Nazi leader Adolf Hitler's anti-Jewish campaigns in 1933, Gold and his family left Germany because of his father's heritage. The family travelled through Europe for the next few years. Gold attended boarding school at the Lyceum Alpinum Zuoz in Zuoz, Switzerland, where he quickly proved to be a clever, competitive and physically and mentally aggressive individual. Gold finished his schooling at Zuoz in 1938, and fled with his family to England after the German invasion of Austria in early 1938. Gold entered Trinity College, Cambridge in 1939 and began studying mechanical sciences. In May 1940, just as Hitler was commencing his advance in Belgium and France, Gold was sent into internment as an enemy alien by the British government. It was on the first night of internment, at an army barracks in Bury St Edmunds, that he met his future collaborator and close friend, Hermann Bondi.

Gold spent most of his nearly 15 months of internment in a camp in Canada, after which he returned to England and reentered Cambridge University, where he abandoned his study of mechanical sciences for physics. After graduating with a pass (Ordinary) degree in June 1942, Gold worked briefly as an agricultural labourer and lumberjack in northern England before joining Bondi and Fred Hoyle on naval research into radar ground clutter near Dunsfold, Surrey. The three men would spend their off-duty hours in "intense and wide-ranging scientific discussion" on topics such as cosmology, mathematics and astrophysics. Within months, Gold was placed in charge of constructing new radar systems. Gold determined how landing craft could use radar to navigate to the appropriate landing spot on D-Day and also discovered that the German navy had fitted snorkels to its U-boats, making them operable underwater while still taking in air from above the surface.

== Schooling and work in England ==
Immediately after the war, Hoyle and Bondi returned to Cambridge, while Gold stayed with naval research until 1947. He then began working at Cambridge's Cavendish Laboratory to help construct the world's largest magnetron, a device invented by two British scientists in 1940 that generated intense microwaves for radar. Soon after, Gold joined R. J. Pumphrey, a zoologist at the Cambridge Zoology Laboratory who had served as the deputy head of radar naval research during the war, to study the effect of resonance on the human ear.

=== Theory of human hearing ===
Via simple experimentation in 1946, Gold found that the degree of resonance observed in the cochlea was not in accordance with the level of damping that would be expected from the viscosity of the watery liquid that fills the inner ear. As recounted by Freeman Dyson, who was one of the fellow students at Cambridge whom Gold experimented on, the procedure was "simple, elegant, and original." Gold built his experimental apparatus out of war surplus Navy electronics and headphones. This was equipment that Gold had used during his World War II assignment to the Royal Navy as a radar and radio communications specialist.

In 1948 he published two papers on his results; one described the theory and the other reporting the experimental results. His theory was that the ear operates instead in the same way as does a "regenerative radio receiver" by adding energy at the same frequency it is trying to detect. (Later this became known as otoacoustic emission.) Although Gold won a prize fellowship from Trinity College for his thesis on this proposed mechanism of hearing and obtained a junior lectureship at the Cavendish Laboratory, his theory was widely ignored by ear specialists and physiologists, such as future (1961) Nobel Prize winner Georg von Békésy, who did not believe the cochlea operated under a feedback system. Later, however, researchers discovered that Gold's hypothesis had been correct. As reported in one of the science obituaries published about Gold in 2004, "Ignored for over 30 years, his research was rediscovered in the 1970s when physiologists discovered the tiny hair cells that act as amplifiers in the inner ear."

=== Steady-state theory ===
Gold began discussing problems in physics with Hoyle and Bondi again, centering on the issues over redshift and Hubble's law. This led the three to all start questioning the Big Bang theory originally proposed by Georges Lemaître in 1931 and later advanced by George Gamow, which suggested that the universe expanded from an extremely dense and hot state and continues to expand today. As recounted in a 1978 interview with physicist and historian Spencer R. Weart, Gold believed that there was reason to think that the creation of matter was "done all the time and then none of the problems about fleeting moments arise. It can be just in a steady state with the expansion taking things apart as fast as new matter comes into being and condenses into new galaxies".

Two papers were published in 1948 discussing the "steady-state theory" as an alternative to the Big Bang: one by Hermann Bondi and Gold, the other by Fred Hoyle. In their seminal paper, Bondi and Gold asserted that although the universe is expanding, it nevertheless does not change its look over time; it has no beginning and no end. They proposed the perfect cosmological principle as the underpinning of their theory, which held that the universe is homogeneous and isotropic in space and time. On the large scale, they argued that there "is nothing outstanding about any place in the universe, and that those differences which do exist are only of local significance; that seen on a large scale the universe is homogeneous." However, since the universe was not characterized by a lack of evolution, distinguishing features or recognizable direction of time, they postulated that there had to be large-scale motions in the universe. They highlighted two possible types of motion: large-scale expansion and its reverse, large-scale contraction. They estimated that within the expanding universe, hydrogen atoms were being created out of a vacuum at a rate of one atom per cubic meter per 10^{9} years. This creation of matter would keep the density of the universe constant as it expanded. Gold and Bondi also stated that the issues with time scale that had plagued other cosmological theories – such as the discrepancy between the age of the universe as calculated by Hubble and dating of radioactive decay in terrestrial rocks – were absent for the steady-state theory.

It was not until the 1960s that major problems with the steady-state theory began to emerge, when observations apparently supported the idea that the universe was in fact changing: quasars and radio galaxies were found only at large distances (therefore existing only in the distant past), not in closer galaxies. Whereas the Big Bang theory predicted as much, steady state predicted that such objects would be found everywhere, including close to our own galaxy, since evolution would be more evenly distributed, not observed only at great distances. In addition, proponents of the theory predicted that in addition to hydrogen atoms, antimatter would also be produced, as with cosmic gamma ray background from the annihilation of protons and antiprotons and X-ray emitting gas from the creation of neutrons.

For most cosmologists, the refutation of the steady-state theory came with the discovery of the cosmic microwave background radiation in 1965, which was predicted by the Big Bang theory. Stephen Hawking said that the fact that microwave radiation had been found, and that it was thought to be left over from the Big Bang, was "the final nail in the coffin of the steady-state theory." Bondi conceded that the theory had been disproved, but Hoyle and Gold remained unconvinced for a number of years. Gold even supported Hoyle's modified steady-state theory; however, by 1998 he started to express some doubts about the theory, but maintained that despite its faults, the theory helped improve understanding regarding the origin of the universe.

=== Extra-galactic radio signals ===
In 1951, at a meeting of the Royal Astronomical Society, Gold proposed that the source of recent radio signals detected from space was outside the Milky Way galaxy, much to the derision of radio astronomer Martin Ryle and several mathematical cosmologists. However, a year later, a distant source was identified and Gold announced at an International Astronomical Union meeting in Rome that his theory had been proven. Ryle would later take Gold's argument as proof of extragalactic evolution, claiming that it invalidated the steady-state theory.

=== Shock wave origin of magnetic storms ===
Gold left Cambridge in 1952 to become the chief assistant to Astronomer Royal Harold Spencer Jones at the Royal Greenwich Observatory in Herstmonceux, Sussex, England. While there, Gold attracted some controversy by suggesting that the interaction between charged particles from the Sun with the Earth's magnetic field in creating magnetic storms in the upper atmosphere was an example of a collisionless shock wave. The theory was widely disputed, until American scientists in 1957 discovered that Gold's theory held up to mathematical scrutiny by conducting a simulation using a shock tube.

== Astrophysics work in the USA ==
Gold resigned from the Royal Observatory following Spencer-Jones's retirement and moved to the United States in 1956, where he served as Professor of Astronomy (1957–1958) and Robert Wheeler Wilson Professor of Applied Astronomy (1958–1959) at Harvard University. In early 1959, he accepted an appointment at Cornell University, which had offered him the opportunity to set up an interdisciplinary unit for radiophysics and space research, and take charge of the Department of Astronomy. At the time, there was only one other faculty member in the department. Gold would serve as director of the Center for Radiophysics and Space Research until 1981, establishing Cornell as a leading hub of scientific research. During his tenure, Gold hired famed astronomers Carl Sagan and Frank Drake, helped establish the world's largest radio telescope at the Arecibo Observatory in Puerto Rico and the Cornell-Sydney University Astronomy Center with Harry Messel. In addition, Gold served as Assistant Vice President for Research from 1969–1971 and the John L. Wetherill Professor of Astronomy from 1971 until his retirement in 1986.

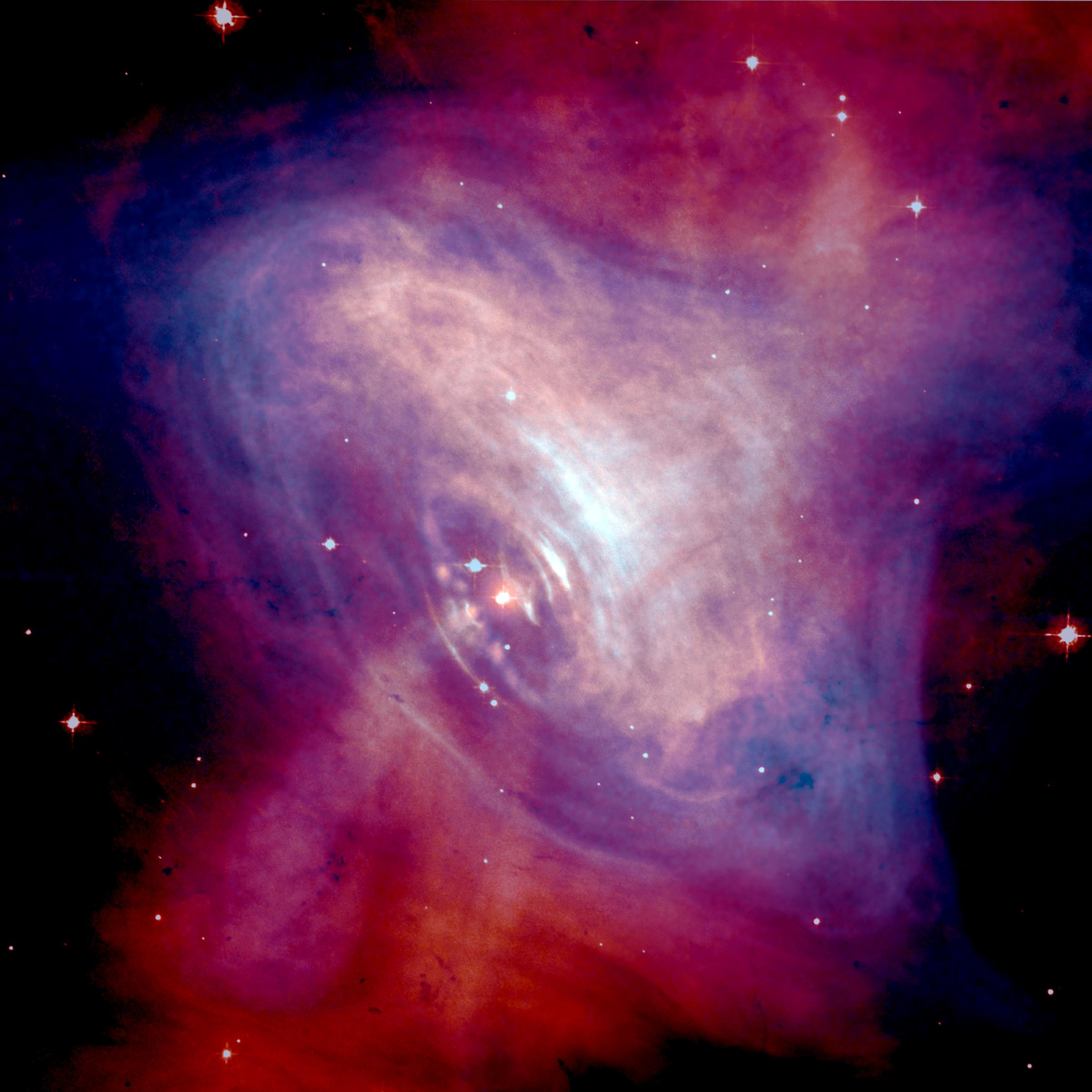
The discovery of a pulsar with 0.033 second period in the Crab Nebula led to the acceptance of Gold's theory on pulsars.

=== Solar nanoflares and Earth's magnetosphere ===
In 1959, Gold expanded on his previous prediction of a collisionless shock wave, arguing that solar flares would eject material into magnetic clouds to produce a shock front that would result in geomagnetic storms. He also coined the term "magnetosphere" in his paper "Motions in the Magnetosphere of the Earth" to describe "the region above the ionosphere in which the magnetic field of the Earth has a dominant control over the motions of gas and fast charged particles ... [which was] known to extend out to a distance of the order of 10 Earth radii". A 2015 paper titled "Modelling nanoflares in active regions and implications for coronal heating mechanisms," attributes the initial idea of the cause of magnetic storms above Earth to Gold: "The heating of the solar corona by small, impulsive heating events appears to date to a discussion by Gold [1], and the subsequent more quantitative proposal of Levine [2,3] that small coronal current sheets were responsible for the heating."

=== Panspermia and pulsars ===
In 1960, Gold collaborated again with Fred Hoyle to show that magnetic energy fueled solar flares and that flares were triggered when opposite magnetic loops interact and release their stored energy.

In 1960, Gold suggested a "garbage theory" for the origin of life, thus constituting a kind of "accidental panspermia". The theory proposes that life on Earth might have spread from a pile of waste products accidentally dumped on Earth long ago by extraterrestrials.

In 1968, a Cambridge radio astronomy postgraduate student Jocelyn Bell Burnell and her doctoral adviser Antony Hewish discovered a pulsing radio source with a period of 1.337 seconds. The source – which was termed "pulsar" – emitted beams of electromagnetic radiation at a very short and consistent interval. Gold proposed that these objects were rapidly rotating neutron stars. Gold argued that due to their strong magnetic fields and high rotational speed, pulsars would emit radiation similar to a rotating beacon. Gold's conclusion was initially not well received by the scientific community; in fact, he was refused permission to present his theory at the first international conference on pulsars. However, Gold's theory became widely accepted following the discovery of a pulsar in the Crab Nebula using the Arecibo radio telescope, opening the door for future advancements in solid-state physics and astronomy. Anthony Tucker of The Guardian remarked that Gold's discovery paved the way for Stephen Hawking's groundbreaking research into black holes.

=== Moon dust and NASA ===
Bootprint of Lunar Module Pilot Buzz Aldrin on the surface of the Moon. Aldrin photographed this bootprint on July 20, 1969, as part of investigations into the soil mechanics of the lunar surface.

From the 1950s, Gold served as a consultant to NASA and held positions on several national space committees, including the President's Science Advisory Committee, as the United States tried to develop its space program. At the time, scientists were engaged in a heated debate over the physical properties of the Moon's surface. In 1955, he predicted that the Moon was covered by a layer of fine rock powder stemming from "the ceaseless bombardment of its surface by Solar System debris". This led to the dust being jokingly referred to as "Gold dust" or "Gold's dust". Gold initially suggested that astronauts would sink into the dust, but upon later analysis of impact craters and electrostatic fields, he determined that the astronauts' boots would sink only three centimeters into the Moon's surface. In any case, NASA sent unmanned Surveyors to analyze the conditions on the surface of the Moon. Gold was ridiculed by fellow scientists, not only for his hypothesis, but for the approach he took in communicating NASA's concerns to the American public; in particular, some experts were infuriated with his usage of the term "Moon dust" in reference to lunar regolith. When the Apollo 11 crew landed on the Moon in 1969 and brought back the first samples of lunar rocks, researchers found that lunar soil was in fact powdery. Gold said the findings were consistent with his hypothesis, noting that "in one area as they walked along, they sank in between five and eight inches". However, Gold received little credit for his correct prediction, and was even criticized for his original prediction of a deep layer of lunar dust. Gold had also contributed to the Apollo program by designing the Apollo Lunar Surface Closeup Camera (ALSCC) (a kind of stereo camera) used on the Apollo 11, 12, and 14 missions.

In the 1970s and 1980s, Gold was a vocal critic of NASA's Space Shuttle program, deriding claims that the agency could fly 50 missions a year or that it could have low budget costs. NASA officials warned Gold that if he testified his concerns before Congress, his research proposals would lose their support from NASA. Gold ignored the warning and testified before a Congressional committee headed by Senator Walter Mondale. In a letter to NASA administrator James C. Fletcher, George Low wrote that "Gold should realize that being funded by the Government and NASA is a privilege, and that it would make little sense for us to fund him as long as his views are what they are now". Gold recalled the aftermath of his testimony in a 1983 interview with astronomy historian David H. DeVorkin:

I had a very hard time with NASA, year after year. I got some more money, but eventually it fizzled out, after three years or so after this event. My applications, which previously each year had always gone through very smoothly, were turned down. I would then have to go to Washington, discuss it with them. and I then would get a certain fraction of it resurrected. For several years running this happened, and then eventually it fizzled permanently, and I've not tried to get any money out of NASA since.
...
I was certainly regarded as persona non grata with NASA after that. I had a very hard time. Shortly after that Noel Hinners became the Space Science administrator, and he used to joke about it and say, "Oh. Tommy's got to come to his annual pilgrimage to Washington," and regarded it as very funny, but then he'd always give me some money. But always clearly as a persona non grata.

== Contrarian views in geology and biology ==
=== Abiogenic origins of petroleum ===
Thomas Gold first became interested in the origins of petroleum in the 1950s, postulating a theory on the abiogenic formation of fossil fuels. Gold engaged in thorough discussion on the matter with Fred Hoyle, who even included a chapter on "Gold's Pore Theory" in his 1955 book Frontiers in Astronomy.

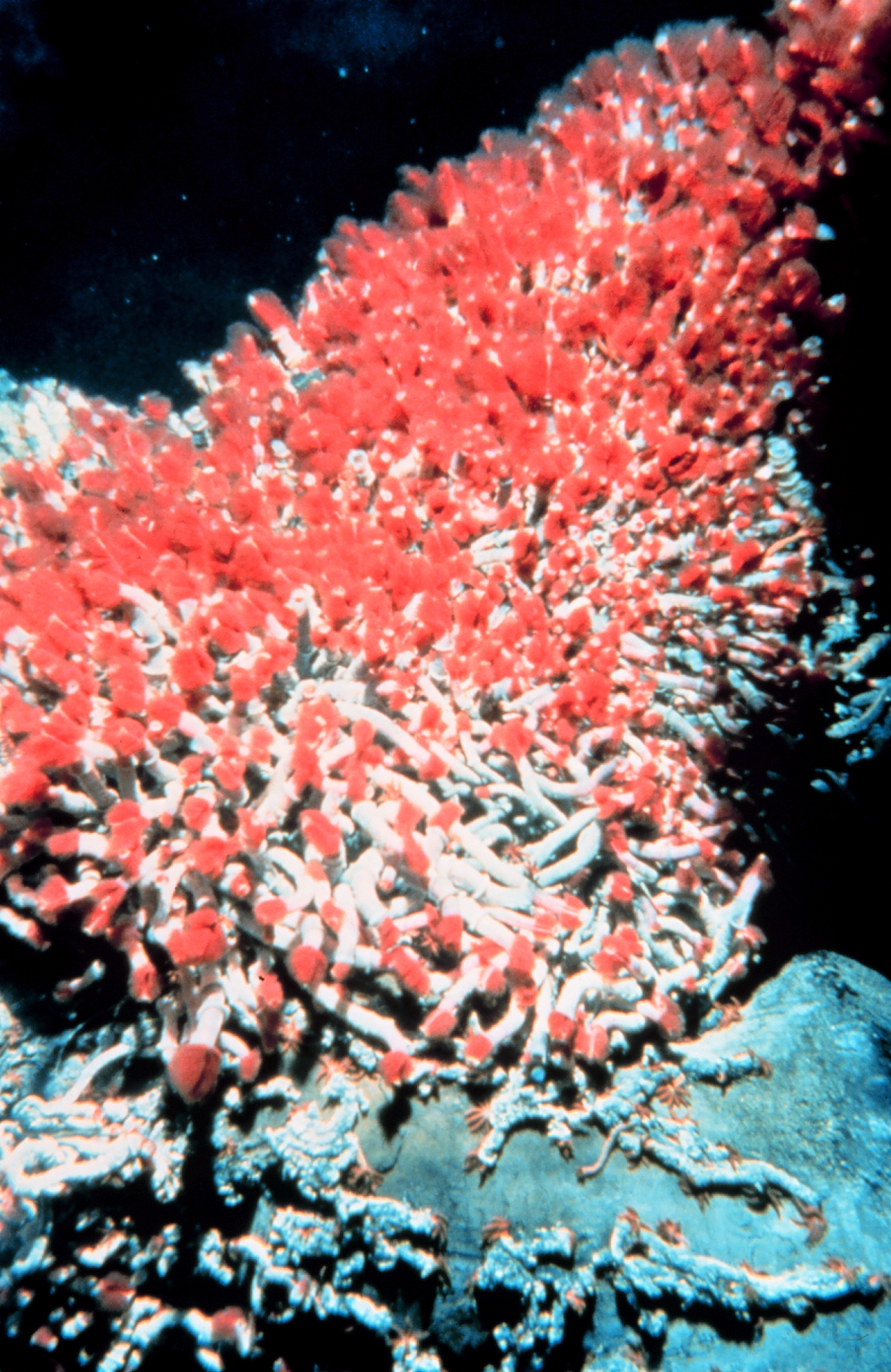
Tube worms feeding at base of a black smoker hydrothermal vent

While Russian scientists had long been at work explicating possible abiogenic origins of petroleum, the Cold War blocked knowledge of their publications until the 1990s. Thus, Thomas Gold was credited with the idea in the United States when current events prompted him to submit an opinion piece to the Wall Street Journal in June 1977 titled, "Rethinking the origins of oil and gas." Concern about gasoline shortages that began in 1973 were still troubling the economy. A striking discovery in the deep-sea just four months earlier (February 1977) was another impetus: Exploration and photography of a deep-sea hydrothermal vent showed a dense amount of life living on chemical energy. Stationary organisms depending on vent outflows included albino clams and tube worms larger than ever seen in surface marine ecosystems. Most astonishing was that such ecosystems were based on microbial life living entirely on chemosynthetic rather than photosynthetic ways of capturing energy and building living cells.

Science communicator Paul Davies explained Gold's theory in this way: "Conventional wisdom has it that oil and coal are remnants of ancient surface life that became buried and subjected to extremes of temperature and pressure. Gold maintains that these deposits are not fossil fuels in the normal sense, but the products of primordial hydrocarbons dating from the time of the Earth's formation. He claims that over the aeons the volatile gases migrate towards the surface through cracks in the crust, and either leak into the atmosphere as methane, become trapped in sub-surface gas fields, or are robbed of their hydrogen to become oil, tar or carbonaceous material like coal."

As to the ubiquity of abiotic hydrocarbons in the Solar System, a 1999 profile of Gold in the Washington Post quoted him as saying, "it always seemed absurd to me to see petroleum hydrocarbons on other planets, where there was obviously never any vegetation, even as we insist that on Earth they must be biological in origin."

=== Earthquakes from rising methane ===
Having established the theoretical foundations of his abiogenic petroleum hypothesis, Gold began in-depth thinking and research on the kinds of empirical evidence that might land in its favor. First was collaborating with a former graduate student of his at Cornell University: Steven Soter. Soter had received his PhD in astronomy in 1971 and had recently concluded another faculty collaboration at Cornell: working with Carl Sagan in the writing of the television series, Cosmos: A Personal Voyage. Gold and Soter teamed up to investigate the knowns and unknowns about earthquakes from the standpoint of plausible causation by or regular co-occurrence with sudden escape of large volumes of methane gas. The result was a series of papers, including two with "earthquakes" in the title: "North Sea-quakes" (New Scientist 1979) and "Fluid Ascent through the Solid Lithosphere and its Relation to Earthquakes" (Pure and Applied Geophysics 1985). Their 1980 article in Scientific American was titled "The Deep-Earth-Gas Hypothesis" and the explanatory value of the idea was presented as, providing "a unified basis for explaining a number of otherwise rather puzzling phenomena that either give warning of earthquakes or accompany them." Even so, they cautioned, "The sampling of such gases is just beginning, and the data will not yet support confident conclusions."

The puzzling phenomena associated with earthquakes include "flames that shoot from the ground, earthquake lights, fierce bubbling in bodies of water, sulfurous air and the strange behavior of animals, loud explosive and hissing noises, and visible waves rolling slowly along alluvial ground." They constructed a map of the world depicting major oil-producing regions and areas with historical seismic activity. Several oil-rich regions, such as Alaska, Texas, the Caribbean, Mexico, Venezuela, the Persian Gulf, the Urals, Siberia, and Southeast Asia, were shown to be lying on major earthquake belts. Gold and Soter suggested that these belts may explain the upward migration of gases originating at depth. "The fact is that oil and gas fields show a distinct association with such earthquake-prone regions. The association suggests to us that the deep faults may provide a conduit for the continuous input of nonbiological methane streaming up from below. Moreover, the upward migration of methane and other gases in fault zones may contribute to the triggering of earthquakes."

He also pointed to the abundance of helium in oil and gas reserves as evidence for "a deep source of the hydrocarbons". Moreover, a few oil reserves thought to have been exhausted were suddenly generating vast amounts of crude oil. From this, Gold proposed that the Earth may possess a virtually endless supply – suggesting as much as "at least 500 million years' worth of gas" – of fossil fuels.

=== The helium anomaly ===
In later publications, Gold emphasized that the immense amounts of helium gas that surge upward during commercial petroleum production at some sites is proof in itself that substantial lightweight gases have indeed persisted at depth since the amalgamation of cosmic debris into planet Earth during the birth of this solar system. In his 1998 book, Gold closed his fourth chapter, "Evidence for Deep-Earth Gas," with a section titled "The Association of Helium with Hydrocarbons."

=== A test: Drilling deep into granite ===
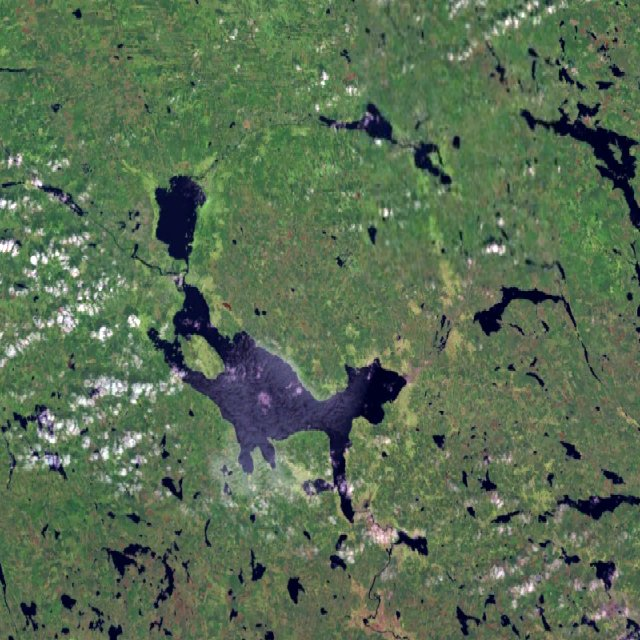
Sweden's Lake Siljan is a large lake created from an eroded impact crater, the Siljan Ring, that was formed by a meteorite impact about 370 million years ago. It was at this lake that Gold proposed as the most likely place to test the hypothesis on the origin of petroleum because it was one of the few places in the world where the granite basement rock was cracked sufficiently to allow oil to seep up from great depth.

Gold began testing his abiogenic petroleum theory in 1986. With the backing of a group of investors, Vattenfall and the Gas Research Institute, drilling of a deep borehole – named Gravberg-1 – commenced into the bedrock near Lake Siljan in Sweden. This was the site of a large meteor crater, which would have "opened channels deep enough for the methane to migrate upward" and formed deposits in caprock just a few miles beneath the surface. He estimated that the fractures near Lake Siljan reached down nearly 40 kilometers into the earth.

In 1987, approximately 900 barrels (140 m^{3}) of drilling lubricant disappeared nearly 20,000 feet (6,100 m) into the ground, leading Gold to believe that the lubricant had fallen into a methane reservoir. Soon after, the team brought up nearly 100 liters of black oily sludge to the surface. Gold claimed that the sludge contained both oil and remnants of archaebacteria. He argued that "it suggests there is an enormous sphere of life, of biology, at deeper levels in the ground than we have had any knowledge of previously" and that this evidence would "destroy the orthodox argument that since oil contains biological molecules, oil reserves must have derived from biological material".

The announcement of Gold's findings was met with mixed reactions, ranging from "furious incredulity" to "deep skepticism". Geochemist Geoffrey P. Glasby speculated that the sludge could have been formed from the Fischer–Tropsch process, a catalyzed chemical reaction in which synthesis gas, a mixture of carbon monoxide and hydrogen, is converted into liquid hydrocarbons. Critics also dismissed Gold's archaebacteria finding, stating that "since micro-organisms cannot survive at such depth, the bacteria prove that the well has been contaminated from the surface". Geochemist Paul Philp analyzed the sludge and concluded that he could not differentiate between the samples of sludge and oil seep found in sedimentary shale rocks near the surface. He reasoned that oil had migrated from the shale down to the granite deep in the ground. Gold disputed Philp's finding, believing that the oil and gas could have just as easily migrated up to the surface: "They would have it that the oil and gas we found down there was from the five feet of sediments on the top – had seeped all the way down six kilometres down into the granite. I mean, such complete absurdity: you can imagine sitting there with five feet of soil and six kilometres underneath of dense granitic rock, and that methane produced up there has crawled all the way down in preference to water. Absolute nonsense."

In light of the controversy surrounding the sludge and possible drill contamination, Gold abandoned the project at Gravberg-1, calling it a "complete fiasco", and redesigned the experiment by replacing his oil-based drilling lubricant with a water-based one.

The drill hit oil in the spring of 1989, but only collected about 80 barrels (13 m^{3}). Gold stated, "It was not coming up at a rate at which you could sell it, but it showed there was oil down there." The drill then ran into technical problems and was stopped at a depth of 6.8 kilometers. The hole was closed, but a second hole was opened for drilling closer to the "center of the impact ring where there was even less sedimentary rock". By October 1991, the drill hit oil at a depth of 3.8 kilometers, but many skeptics remained unconvinced of the site's prospects. Geologist John R. Castaño concluded that there was insufficient evidence of the mantle as the hydrocarbon source and that it was unlikely that the Siljan site could be used as a commercial gas field. In 2019, a study of gases and secondary carbonate minerals revealed that long-term microbial methanogenesis has occurred in situ deep within the fracture system of the crater (for at least 80 million years) and with an obvious spatial link to seep oils of surficial sedimentary origin, at odds with Gold's theories of deep abiotic gas migration.

Gold's later views on the drilling results can be found in chapter 6, "The Siljan Experiment," of his 1998 book. Another section of the book titled "The Upwelling Theory of Coal Formation" presents another argument in favor of the abiogenic model that he had not presented in an earlier paper. Similarly, he also presents arguments pertaining to the origin of diamonds and that microbial processes are the cause of mineral concentrations at depth.

=== Dispute nearly forgotten ===
In 1996 a paper published in the journal Social Studies of Science was titled, "Which Came First, the Fossil or the Fuel?" The author concluded:

Beginning in the late 1970s, Gold revived the 'abiogenic' theory, which holds that hydrocarbons are primordial, not remnants of decayed biology. By contesting the central tenet of petroleum geology, Gold precipitated a bitter scientific controversy. Both sides employed novel rhetorical strategies in order to impute interests, to contest expertise, to recruit allies from peripheral disciplines, and to claim the mantle of scientific method; and both managed to construct plausible interpretations of the available data.

The author reported that even the Siljan drilling results had not been sufficient to fully resolve the long-standing dispute about origins, although Gold's hypothesis is favored by only a very slim minority. As of 2024, "fossil fuel" is still the prevailing term widely in use in reference to petroleum resources, both within academia and without. Such terminology includes 21st century communications about the causes of anthropogenic climate change and proffered solutions to the crisis, such as the 2023 IPCC report, "Climate Change 2023 Synthesis Report: Summary for Policymakers." Overall, within the academic disciplines of geobiology and petroleum geology, criticism of Gold's abiogenic theory has been severe — but not entire. The dispute is more set aside and forgotten than resolved.

As to whether Gold's framing of distinct chemosynthetic microbes are active and ubiquitous at depth, the established authorities have moved in his direction. (See next section.)

=== "Deep Hot Biosphere" theory ===
In a 1992 paper, "The Deep, Hot Biosphere", Gold first suggested that microbial life is widespread in the porosity of the crust of the Earth, down to depths of several kilometers, where rising temperatures finally set a limit. The subsurface life obtains its energy not from photosynthesis but from chemical sources in fluids migrating upwards through the crust. The mass of the deep biosphere may be comparable to that of the surface biosphere. Subsurface life may be widespread on other bodies in the solar system and throughout the universe, even on worlds unaccompanied by other stars.

A 1993 article by journalist William Broad, published in The New York Times and titled "Strange New Microbes Hint at a Vast Subterranean World," carried Gold's thesis to public attention. The article began, "New forms of microbial life are being discovered in such abundance deep inside the Earth that some scientists are beginning to suspect that the planet has a hidden biosphere extending miles down whose total mass may rival or exceed that of all surface life. If a deep biosphere does exist, scientists say, its discovery will rewrite textbooks while shedding new light on the mystery of life's origins. Even skeptics say the thesis is intriguing enough to warrant new studies of the subterranean realm."

The 1993 article also features how Gold's thesis expands possibilities for astrobiology research: "Dr. Thomas Gold, an astrophysicist at Cornell University known for bold theorizing, has speculated that subterranean life may dot the cosmos, secluded beneath the surfaces of planets and moons and energized by geological processes, with no need for the warming radiation of nearby stars. He wrote in The Proceedings of the National Academy of Sciences last year that the solar system might harbor at least 10 deep biospheres. 'Such life may be widely disseminated in the universe,' he said, 'since planetary type bodies with similar subsurface conditions may be common as solitary objects in space, as well as in other solar-type systems.'"

Gold also published a book of the same title, The Deep Hot Biosphere, in 1999, which expanded on the arguments in his 1992 paper and included speculations on the origin of life and on horizontal gene transfer. According to Gold, bacteria feeding on the oil accounts for the presence of biological debris in hydrocarbon fuels, obviating the need to resort to a biogenic theory for the origin of the latter. The flows of underground hydrocarbons may also explain oddities in the concentration of other mineral deposits. In short, Gold said about the origin of natural hydrocarbons (petroleum and natural gas): Hydrocarbons are not biology reworked by geology (as the traditional view would hold), but rather geology reworked by biology.

Freeman Dyson wrote the foreword to Gold's 1999 book, where he concluded, "Gold's theories are always original, always important, usually controversial — and usually right. It is my belief, based on fifty years of observation of Gold as a friend and colleague, that the deep hot biosphere is all of the above: original, important, controversial — and right." (Dyson also delivered a eulogy at Gold's memorial service, a segment of which pertaining to the deep hot biosphere theory is posted on youtube.)

Following Gold's death, scientific discoveries amplified and also shifted understanding of the deep hot biosphere into what is now generally called deep biosphere. However, it is only at great depth where naturally occurring geochemical processes induced by intense heat and pressure produce elemental hydrogen and carbon dioxide upon which novel metabolisms of life (especially among the primitive Archaea) could have evolved. A retrospective paper published in the same journal as Gold's 1992 paper featured the metabolic and genetic discoveries of life forms at depth that Gold's paper inspired. Titled "The Deep, Hot Biosphere: Twenty-five years of retrospection," the authors conclude:

The pioneering ideas proposed by Thomas Gold inspired a generation of researchers in the field of geobiology to dive deeper into the possibilities of subsurface life, spawning hundreds of relevant publications.... Deep hydrocarbon deposits on Mars, Titan, and worlds beyond could play host to life similar to that in Earth's own crust. The techniques used to better study and understand deep, hot biospheres on Earth could then be applied to robotically probe targets in deep space as we move into the next century of scientific discovery. Technology is advancing at a rate wherein we may find that Gold's deep, hot biosphere is not only true, but common across the universe.

A term Gold coined in his 1999 book carries forward, too, and is a reminder of the worldview shift he advocated. The term is "surface chauvinism". Gold wrote, "In retrospect, it is not hard to understand why the scientific community has typically sought only surface life in the heavens. Scientists have been hindered by a sort of 'surface chauvinism.'" In 2024 NASA launched the first spacecraft, Europa Clipper, to study and sample whether one of the moons of an outer planet that Gold had pointed to as a prospect for deep life (Europa, a moon of Jupiter) might indeed harbor the physical and chemical conditions essential for carbon-based life.

== Academic legacy ==
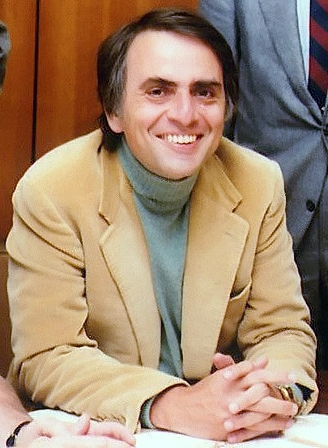
Carl Sagan, hired by Gold after Sagan was denied tenure at Harvard University in 1968

Throughout his academic career, Gold received a number of honors and distinctions. He was a Fellow of the Royal Astronomical Society (1948), the Royal Society (1964), the American Geophysical Union (1962), the American Academy of Arts and Sciences (1974), and the American Astronautical Society, a member of the American Philosophical Society (1972), the United States National Academy of Sciences (1974) and the International Academy of Astronautics, and an Honorary Fellow of Trinity College, Cambridge (1986). In addition, he served as President of the New York Astronomical Society from 1981 to 1986. Gold won the John Frederick Lewis Award from the American Philosophical Society in 1972 for his paper "The Nature of the Lunar Surface: Recent Evidence" and the Humboldt Prize from the Alexander von Humboldt Foundation in 1979. In 1985, Gold won the prestigious Gold Medal of the Royal Astronomical Society, an award whose recipients include Fred Hoyle, Hermann Bondi, Martin Ryle, Edwin Hubble, James Van Allen, Fritz Zwicky, Hannes Alfvén and Albert Einstein. Gold did not earn a doctorate, but received an honorary Doctor of Science degree from Cambridge University in 1969.

Following his death in 2004, obituaries laying out the breadth of his scientific inquiries appeared in a number of scientific journals. In the journal Nature, Hermann Bondi wrote "Tommy Gold will long be remembered as a singular scientist who stepped into any field where he thought an option was being overlooked. He was also unusual in working mainly theoretically, but using little mathematics, relying instead on his profound intuitive understanding of physics." The obituary in Physics Today included a listing of topics he delved into: "the alignment of galactic dust, the instability of Earth's axis of rotation, the dusty lunar surface, the Sun's cosmic rays, and plasmas and magnetic fields in the solar system ... the origin of solar flares, the nature of time, molecules and masers in the interstellar medium, rotating neutron stars and the nature of pulsars, terrestrial sources of hydrocarbons, and the deep Earth biosphere."

Gold's boldness in his approach is another aspect of his legacy. The obituary in the Bulletin of the American Astronomical Society called attention to his being "regarded by some as a scientific maverick who delighted in controversy. In reality, he was an iconoclast whose strength was in penetrating analysis of the assumptions on which some of our most important theories are based.... Tommy's paradigm-changing ideas in astronomy and planetary science, while original and bold, were also highly controversial. With his radical work on the origin of natural gas and petroleum, the controversy is likely to continue.... He will be remembered as one of the most interesting, dynamic and influential scientists of his generation." The obituary in The Guardian stated that Gold would "dive into new territory to open up problems unseen by others — in biophysics, astrophysics, space engineering, or geophysics. Controversy followed him everywhere. Possessing profound scientific intuition and open-minded rigour, he usually ended up challenging the cherished assumptions of others and, to the discomfiture of the scientific establishment, often found them wanting. His stature and influence were international."

== Personal life ==
Gold married his first wife, Merle Eleanor Tuberg, an American astrophysicist who had worked with Subrahmanyan Chandrasekhar, in Cambridge in 1947. He had three daughters with her – Linda, Lucy, and Tanya. After divorcing her, Gold married Carvel Lee Beyer in 1972. With her, he had a daughter Lauren.

Thomas Gold died at the age of 84 from complications due to heart disease, at Cayuga Medical Center in Ithaca, New York. He was buried in the Pleasant Grove Cemetery in Ithaca. He was survived by his wife, four daughters, and six grandchildren.

== Selected publications ==
- Pumphrey, R. J.; Gold, T. (1947), "Transient reception and the degree of resonance of the human ear", Nature, 160 (4056): 124–125, Bibcode:1947Natur.160..124P, doi:10.1038/160124b0, ISSN 0028-0836, PMID 20344383, S2CID 4095013.
- Pumphrey, R. J.; Gold, T. (1948), "Hearing. I. The Cochlea as a Frequency Analyzer", Proceedings of the Royal Society B, 135 (881): 462–491, Bibcode:1948RSPSB.135..462G, doi:10.1098/rspb.1948.0024, ISSN 0080-4649, JSTOR 82558.
- Gold, T. (1948), "Hearing. II. The Physical Basis of the Action of the Cochlea", Proceedings of the Royal Society B, 135 (881): 492–498, Bibcode:1948RSPSB.135..492G, doi:10.1098/rspb.1948.0025, ISSN 0080-4649, JSTOR 82559.
- Bondi, H.; Gold, T. (1948), "The Steady-State Theory of the Expanding Universe", Monthly Notices of the Royal Astronomical Society, 108 (3): 252–270, Bibcode:1948MNRAS.108..252B, doi:10.1093/mnras/108.3.252, ISSN 1365-2966.
- Gold, T. (1955), "Instability of the Earth's Axis of Rotation", Nature, 175 (4456): 526–529, Bibcode:1955Natur.175..526G, doi:10.1038/175526a0, ISSN 0028-0836, S2CID 5235427.
- Gold, T. (1959), "Motions in the Magnetosphere of the Earth", Journal of Geophysical Research, 64 (9): 1219–1224, Bibcode:1959JGR....64.1219G, doi:10.1029/JZ064i009p01219, ISSN 0148-0227.
- Gold, T.; Hoyle, F. (1960), "On the origin of solar flares", Monthly Notices of the Royal Astronomical Society, 120 (2): 89–105, Bibcode:1960MNRAS.120...89G, doi:10.1093/mnras/120.2.89, ISSN 1365-2966.
- Gold, T. (1962), "The Arrow of Time", American Journal of Physics, 30 (6): 403–410, Bibcode:1962AmJPh..30..403G, doi:10.1119/1.1942052, ISSN 0002-9505.
- Gold, T. (1969), "Rotating neutron stars and the nature of pulsars", Nature, 221 (5175): 25–27, Bibcode:1969Natur.221...25G, doi:10.1038/221025a0, ISSN 0028-0836, S2CID 4181490.
- Gold, T. (1971), "The Nature of the Lunar Surface: Recent Evidence", Proc. Am. Philos. Soc., 115 (2): 74–82, ISSN 0003-049X, JSTOR 985848.
- Gold, T. (1979), "Terrestrial sources of carbon and earthquake outgassing", Journal of Petroleum Geology, 1 (3): 3–19, Bibcode:1979JPetG...1....3G, doi:10.1111/j.1747-5457.1979.tb00616.x, ISSN 0141-6421.
- Gold, T.; Soter, S. (1980), "The deep earth gas hypothesis", Scientific American, 242 (6): 155–161, Bibcode:1980SciAm.242f.154G, doi:10.1038/scientificamerican0680-154, ISSN 0036-8733.
- Gold, T.; Soter, S. (1982), "Abiogenic methane and the origin of petroleum", Energy Exploration & Exploitation, 1 (2): 89–104, Bibcode:1982EExEx...1...89G, doi:10.1177/014459878200100202, ISSN 0144-5987, S2CID 135282142.
- Gold, T. (1987), Power From the Earth: Deep Earth Gas - Energy for the Future, London: Dent & Sons, ISBN 978-0-460-04462-2.
- Gold, T. (1992), "The deep, hot biosphere", Proceedings of the National Academy of Sciences, 89 (13): 6045–6049, Bibcode:1992PNAS...89.6045G, doi:10.1073/pnas.89.13.6045, ISSN 1091-6490, PMC 49434, PMID 1631089.
- Gold, Thomas (1999), The Deep Hot Biosphere, New York: Copernicus (Springer Verlag), ISBN 0-387-98546-8.
- Gold, T. (2012), Taking the Back Off the Watch: A Personal Memoir, New York: Springer, ISBN 978-3-642-27587-6.

== See also ==
- Abiogenic petroleum origin
- Gold universe
- Astronomy
- Astrophysics
- Petroleum
- Theoretical astrophysics
