= Schooliosis =

Misdiagnosis of scoliosis

Schooliosis, a pun on "school" and "scoliosis", is a term for a type of medical misdiagnosis. The word was coined by Petr Skrabanek and James McCormick.

The authors asserted that there is some degree of overdiagnosis of scoliosis in school, which causes ethical, social, and economic damage to the welfare of children. Such overdiagnosis is called "schooliosis" by some academics. Schooliosis is a type of disease mongering.

Preventive medical screening in school or college may lead to an incorrect diagnosis of scoliosis that triggers a series of unnecessary medical interventions on adolescents. There can be diagnostic and therapeutic cascades involving several specialists, which can end with iatrogenic damage to a healthy child with a normal back. The risks are unnecessary overexposure to X-rays (repeated diagnostic X-rays), rehabilitation techniques with side effects (traction), stigmatizing orthopaedic treatment (braces for back injury) and costs in time, travel, etc.

== See also ==
- False positive
- Healthism
- Medicalization
- Patient education
- Quaternary prevention
