= Richard Green (sexologist) =

Psychiatrist and sexologist (1936–2019)

- Born: 6 June 1936; Brooklyn, New York City, US
- Died: 6 April 2019 (aged 82); London, England
- Education: Syracuse University (BA); Johns Hopkins University School of Medicine (MD); Yale University (JD)
- Spouse: Melissa Hines (m. 1988; div. 2014)
- Partner: Claire Loveday
- Children: 1
- Awards: Magnus Hirschfeld Medal for Sexual Research (2006)
- Scientific career
- Fields: Sexology, psychiatry
- Workplaces: University of California, Los Angeles; State University of New York at Stony Brook; Imperial College, London

Richard Green (6 June 1936 – 6 April 2019) was an American sexologist, psychiatrist, lawyer, and author known for his research on homosexuality and transsexualism, specifically gender identity disorder in children. He is known for his behaviorism experiment in which he attempted to prevent male homosexuality and transsexuality by extinguishing feminine behavior in young boys. The findings from his research lead him to favor biological explanations for male homosexuality.

Green was the founding editor of the Archives of Sexual Behavior (1971) and served as Editor until 2001. He was also the founding president of the International Academy of Sex Research (1975), which made the Archives its official publication. He served on the American Psychiatric Association DSM-IV Subcommittee on Gender Identity Disorders.

== Early life and education ==
Green was born on 6 June 1936, in Crown Heights, Brooklyn, New York City, and was raised in a secular Jewish household. His parents were Rose (née Ingber), a teacher, and Leo Green, an accountant.

He earned a BA degree from Syracuse University in 1957, a MD from Johns Hopkins University School of Medicine in 1961, and his J.D. from Yale Law School in 1987.

== Career ==
=== Gender role and sexual orientation research ===
During his medical studies at Johns Hopkins, Green met John Money, who was an assistant professor there, and started collaborating with him on research, initially on boys displaying substantial cross-gender behavior. In 1960, they published the paper "Incongruous Gender Role: Nongenital Manifestations in Prepubertal Boys," detailing their observations of 5 male children who "showed incongruities in gender role", ranging from preferring to play with girls to praying God would change them into a girl. Citing that adult gay men and transgender women recollect gender incongruity in childhood, they later concluded early intervention is best in cases of gender incongruity and that "part of the successful rearing of a child is orienting him, from birth to his biologically and culturally acceptable gender role. This, as far as we know, is best achieved by providing a relationship between husband and wife exemplifying these respective roles."

In 1961, they published a paper titled "Effeminacy in Prepubertal Boys", which looked at eleven young boys who were referred for their "excessive and persistent attempts to dress in the clothes of the opposite gender, constant display of gestures and mannerisms of the opposite sex, preference for play and other activities of the opposite sex, or a stated desire to be a member of the opposite sex". They recommended that parents "Look for insidious and irrational ways in which parents may be unwittingly encouraging girlishness and penalizing their son for developing boyishly. [...] Both [parents] should convey to their son their whole-hearted approval of his present and future masculine behavior and sexuality." The paper conflated gender identity, gender expression, and sexual orientation, viewing effeminacy in boys as a problem to be fixed so as not to lead to adult "homosexuality and transvestism."

In 1968, Green published "Childhood Cross-Gender Identification", a paper reviewing the therapy of nine young male children who were younger than 8 and "clearly prepubertal". The first six were from the collaborative papers between Green and Money, the last 3 were from Robert Stoller. Citing the failure of attempts to "cure" adult trans women, he reported early diagnosis and treatment may be effective in preventing manifestations of adulthood cross-gender identification. The stated goals of family therapy are "for the husband and wife to gain some perspective on the second-class citizen of the husband and of the significance of their unbalanced roles in shaping their son's personality. Additional focus is on the masculinity-inhibiting of mother's anxiety over her son's healthy aggression and her greater comfort with what to her is his less threatening behavior."

In Money's obituary, Green acknowledges Money and Robert Stoller, as well as his father, Leo H. Green, for having set the course for his life and career. In the mid-1960s, Money introduced Green to Harry Benjamin, whom Green acknowledges as having "further honed" his career. In 1969 Green and Money co-edited "Transsexualism and Sex Reassignment", published by Johns Hopkins Press.

In 1972, Green coauthored a paper with Lawrence Newman and Stoller titled "Treatment of Boyhood Transsexualism: An Interim Report of Four Years' Experience," which held reports and comments from their psychiatric experiences. Believing family disturbance to be the cause of gender incongruity, they stated "General principles of therapy are aimed at accomplishing four objectives: (1) Development of a relationship of trust and affection between the male therapist and the boy. (2) Heightening parental concern about the problem so that parents begin to disapprove of feminine interests and no longer covertly encourage them. (3) Promotion of the father's, or a father-substitute's involvement in the boy's life. (4) Sensitization of the parents to the interpersonal difficulties which underlay the tendency of the mother to be overly close with the son and for the father to emotionally divorce himself from family activities." Newman treated a family and tried to inspire aggressiveness in the child, insisting to the mother it was a success that the child struck their sister and mother. In addition, behaviors like dressing femininely were actively disapproved of. In another case treated by Newman he stated he established a warm and friendly relationship to explain feminine behavior was "not right" for a little boy and that he should give it up. In this case, he explains the parents were worried their child "was destined to be a homosexual and felt helpless to do anything about it," but responded quickly when they learned they could do a great deal for the child. In another case treated by Newman, he explained to the patient they'd have to stop feminine behavior now before it's too late, and in a few weeks, the child announced they wanted to "become normal like the other boys," motivated by strong religious commitment. While the patient attempted to develop in a masculine way, Newman continually challenged the "pessimism about becoming masculine and his secret belief that he was destined to live as a feminine person" (216). In a case treated by Green, he made an effort to establish paternal control of the family to shift the child's perception of gender roles. Their final comments included "Some boys reveal their feminine identifications through physical gestures. By the time they are seen in consultation much of this display is unconscious or automatic. In order to bring it under volitional control, the child must be sensitized to when he is walking, sitting, or using his hands "like a girl." Parents should be instructed to consistently point out to the boy when such behavior occurs. In his contact with the boy, the therapist does the same. The boy may also need actual instruction in modifying these gestures" (217). They countered the point they were ascribing an inherently higher value to masculine over feminine behavior by saying it would be easier to modify the behavior of a child rather than the attitude of society towards them.

Green was the founding editor of Archives of Sexual Behavior in 1971, serving as editor for 30 years. In 1974 Green and the board of the new journal established the International Academy of Sex Research, with Green as the founding president; the Archives became the official publication of the academy. The new organization had a more selective membership than Society for the Scientific Study of Sexuality (SSSS), which published the leading US sexology journal of the time, The Journal of Sex Research. The IASR membership has a more medical and biological emphasis and only accepts applications from published researchers. The IASR also has a more international approach, alternatively meeting in the US and other countries every year. Eventually, the Archives became a premier journal in its field. Green retired as Editor of Archives of Sexual Behavior in 2001 and Editorship was continued by Kenneth Zucker.

In 1979 Green was a founding committee member of the Harry Benjamin International Gender Dysphoria Association and served as president from 1997 to 1999. He previously directed the human sexuality program at the State University of New York at Stony Brook. He was at various times Professor of Psychiatry at the University of California, Los Angeles, Professor of Psychiatry at the State University of New York at Stony Brook, and Professor of Psychological Medicine, Imperial College, London. He was on the faculty of Law at UCLA and Cambridge. He was made a Fellow of the Royal College of Psychiatrists in 1994. Green served as President of HBIGDA, now known as World Professional Association for Transgender Health, from 1997 to 1999.

Clinical vignettes from Green's work on gender identity disorder appear in widely used textbooks, such as Kaplan and Sadock's Synopsis of Psychiatry (10th ed.) The term "gender identity disorder" itself introduced in DSM-III was taken from Green's 1974 work, Sexual Identity Conflict in Children and Adults (New York, Basic Books). He served on the American Psychiatric Association DSM-IV Subcommittee on Gender Identity Disorders. In 2006 he was awarded the Magnus Hirschfeld Medal for Sexual Research.

Green was research director and consultant psychiatrist at the Gender Identity Clinic at Charing Cross Hospital in London and Senior Research Fellow, the Institute of Criminology, Cambridge, and a Member of Darwin College, Cambridge.

=== Law practice ===
Green was co-counsel for Elke Sommer in her libel suit against Zsa Zsa Gabor. He was co-counsel with the ACLU in a case challenging the Boy Scouts for refusing membership to a young gay man in California—Curran v. Mount Diablo Council of the Boy Scouts of America.

== Personal life and death ==
Starting in 1986, his partner was Melissa Hines, a researcher and professor of psychology at the Faculty of Politics, Psychology, Sociology and International Studies, University of Cambridge. They married, and divorced in 2014. He had one son from his first marriage. At the time of death his partner was Claire Loveday.

Green died on 6 April 2019, aged 82, at his home in London from esophageal cancer.

== Views and controversies ==
During the APA's heated debate in the early 1970s about the declassification of homosexuality as a mental illness, Green argued forcefully in favor of declassification. He argued that the grounds for deciding the issue should be the "historical and cross-cultural groundings in homosexual expression, associated psychiatric features accompanying a homosexual orientation, the emotional consequences to the homosexual of societal condemnation, and behaviors of other species". Green applauded the eventual APA decision while strongly criticizing the fact that the administration put it to a vote, saying that such "a shotgun marriage between science and democracy" was "ludicrous".

In his work, on gender identity in children, Green used common English expressions like "sissy boy" and "tomboy" in the titles of some of his publications. His choice of terminology was criticized as offensive.

In 2002, he initiated a debate in a special issue of the Archives of Sexual Behavior regarding the extent to which pedophilia should be classified as a mental disorder by the American Psychiatric Association, without impinging on the legal and law enforcement aspects. It concluded that sexual arousal to children is subjectively reported "in a substantial minority of "normal" people", and reviewed the level of social acceptance of this historically, but stated that such observations may not entail cultural or legal acceptance today. The paper also raised specific concerns about the DSM-IV definition, some of which were later acknowledged by Ray Blanchard in his literature review for the DSM-5 workgroup, which proposed a more general nomenclature distinction between paraphilias and paraphilic disorders; this proposal is part of the DSM-5 draft. In 2010, however, Green criticized in stronger terms Blanchard's proposal to introduce hebephilia as a mental disorder in the DSM-5 (as a subtype the proposed pedohebophilic disorder). Pointing to the legal age of sexual consent in several countries of Europe, this would declare 19-year-olds engaged sexually with 14-year-olds as having a mental disorder.

In terms of research on biology and sexual orientation, Green was optimistic about progress and told a reporter "I suspect that at least in your lifetime we will find a gene that contributes substantially to sexual orientation."

He received the 2006 Magnus Hirschfeld Medal.

== Publications ==
- Money, John; Green, Richard (1960). "Incongruous Gender Role: Nongenital Manifestations in Prepubertal Boys". The Journal of Nervous and Mental Disease. 131 (2): 160–168. doi:10.1097/00005053-196008000-00009. PMID 13708206. S2CID 45302178.
- Money, John; Green, Richard (February 1961). "Effeminacy in Prepubertal Boys". Pediatrics. 27 (2): 286–291. doi:10.1542/peds.27.2.286. S2CID 245091693.
- Green R, Money J (1969). Transsexualism and Sex Reassignment. The Johns Hopkins Press (1 November 1969) ISBN 0-8018-1038-8.
- Green R (1974). Sexual Identity Conflict in Children and Adults. Basic Books (1974). ISBN 0-465-07726-9.
- Green R (1979). Human Sexuality: A Health Practitioner's Text. Williams & Wilkins; 2nd edition (June 1979) ISBN 0-683-03764-1.
- Green R (1987). The "Sissy Boy Syndrome" and the Development of Homosexuality. Yale Univ Pr (February 1987) ISBN 0-300-03696-5.
- West DJ, Green R (eds.) (1997). Sociolegal Control of Homosexuality: A Multi-Nation Comparison. Springer; 1 edition (31 October 1997) ISBN 0-306-45532-3.
- Green R (1992). Sexual Science and the Law. Harvard University Press (November 1992). ISBN 0-674-80268-3.
