= Brain Gender =

2005 book by Melissa Hines

- Author: Melissa Hines
- Language: English
- Publisher: Oxford University Press
- Publication date: April 14, 2005
- Pages: 336
- ISBN: 978-0195188363

Brain Gender is a 2005 biology book by Melissa Hines, published by Oxford University Press. Hines is a psychologist and neuroscientist at the University of Cambridge in England. Hines graduated with an undergraduate degree from Princeton, following through with a doctorate in psychology from UCLA.

Brain Gender is a book exploring the biological differences between sex and gender. Hines questions whether different biological differences, such as hormones, affect the way people develop and act. Hines demonstrates the possibilities that genetic, biological, neuroendocrine, behavioral, social, and statistical aspects of born sex affect the differences between males or females in gender roles.

At the end of the book, it is concluded that the human tendency to perceive generalized gender differences is not supported by evidence. Biology does not imply a deterministic set of gender creation or identification.
