= Motivational deficiency disorder =

Fictitious disease

Motivational deficiency disorder is the name of a fake disease introduced on April Fool's Day 2006 as part of a health campaign to raise awareness of disease mongering.

== Campaign ==
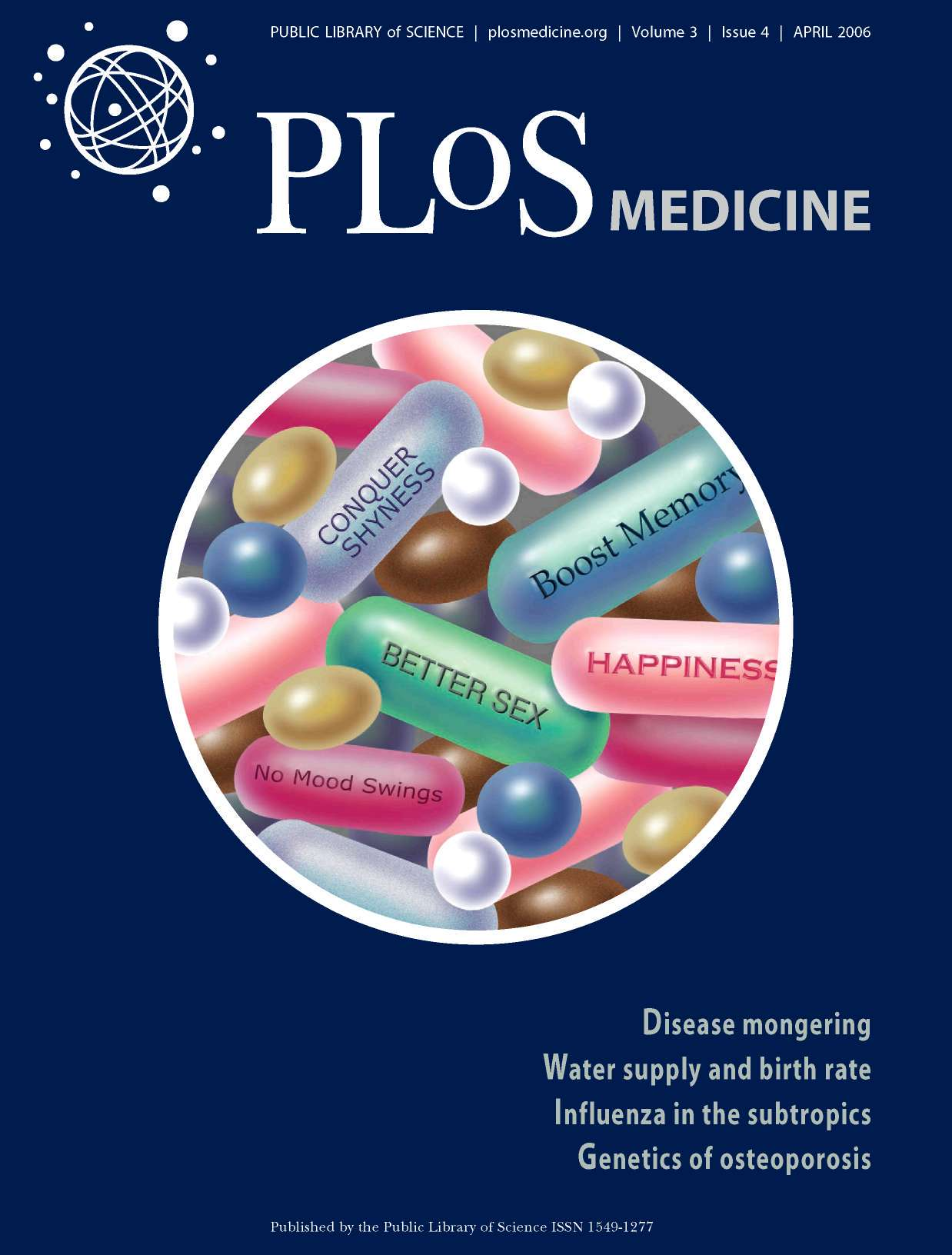
The original campaign included a notice to read this issue of PLOS.

The disease was first described in an effort coordinated by Ray Moynihan when BMJ published a description of it for April Fool's Day in 2006.

Fake neurologist "Leth Argos" is said to have described the disorder, finding that "extreme laziness may have a medical basis" and that "motivational deficiency disorder can be fatal, because the condition reduces the motivation to breathe." Despite the condition being poorly understood, it is also "underdiagnosed and undertreated." A person living with the condition complained that he would spend all day at the beach.

In the original campaign medical marketers recommended treating the disease with a drug called "Indolebant". They presented a case study in which a lazy man who took the drug then got off his sofa to begin a job as an investment adviser. The original campaign also contained an advertisement for an issue of PLOS on disease mongering.

In 2008 Consumers International revived the campaign to draw further attention to the issue of disease mongering.

Although a spoof, some news outlets have reported the disease as if this were a real disorder. The disease was invented and presented to the public as a demonstration that some media outlets are willing to publish sensational health stories and that people respond with worry when they do.
