= Sexual Science and the Law =

1992 book by Richard Green

- Title page for Sexual Science and the Law (1992)
- Author: Richard Green
- Language: English
- Genre: Non-fiction
- Publisher: Harvard University Press
- Publication date: 1992
- Publication place: United States
- Pages: 432
- ISBN: 978-0-674-80268-1

Sexual Science and the Law is a book written by UCLA professor Richard Green and published by Harvard University Press in 1992. The book examines topics related to homosexuality, transsexualism, intergenerational sex and abortion.
