= Merle Gold =

Astrophysicist (1921–2017)

- Born: 7 March 1921
- Died: 29 September 2017 (age 96)
- Education: University of Chicago
- Spouse: Thomas Gold
- Scientific career
- Fields: Astrophysics
- Workplaces: University of Cambridge
- Thesis: The variations of absorption line contours across the solar disc
- Doctoral advisor: Subrahmanyan Chandrasekhar

Merle Eleanor Gold (née Tuberg) (7 March 1921- 29 September 2017) was an American astrophysicist, best known for her study of the Sun with Nobel Laureate Subrahmanyan Chandrasekhar.

== Early life and education ==
Merle Gold was born on 7 March 1921 and grew up in Rochester, Minnesota to Nathaniel and Eleanor Tuberg. She graduated high school in 1939 as Valedictorian of her class. She trained as a medical secretary at Mayo Clinic for two years before undertaking her undergraduate degree at University of Chicago. After graduating, she went on to complete her PhD in astrophysics under Subrahmanyan Chandrasekhar at Yerkes Observatory. Her thesis was on how absorption lines detected from the Sun vary across the solar disk.

== Research and career ==
In 1946, Merle was awarded a post-doctoral fellowship at University of Cambridge. She published one research paper after her thesis on the lifetimes of clusters of nebulae outside the Milky Way. In 1971, she became an editor at Cornell School of Agriculture where she worked until her retirement.

== Personal life ==
She married astronomer Thomas Gold in 1947 and they had 3 children together before divorcing in 1971. Merle died in Ithaca, New York on 29 September 2017.

== Notable publications ==
- Merle Tuberg. (November 1943). "On the Lifetime of Clusters of Extragalactic Nebulae". Astrophysical Journal. 98. 501–503. doi: 10.1086/144582
- Merle Tuberg. (March 1946). "The Variations of Absorption-Line Contours across the Solar Disc". Astrophysical Journal. 103. 145. doi:10.1086/144799
