= Gold universe =

Cosmological model

A Gold universe is a cosmological model of the universe. In these models, the universe starts with a Big Bang and expands for some time, with increasing entropy and a thermodynamic arrow of time pointing in the direction of the expansion. After the universe reaches a low-density state, it recontracts, but entropy now decreases, pointing the thermodynamic arrow of time in the opposite direction, until the universe ends in a low-entropy, high-density Big Crunch.

There are two models of the universe which support the possibility of a reversed direction of time. The first begins with a state of low entropy at the Big Bang which continually increases until the Big Crunch. The second, a Gold Universe, posits that entropy will increase only until a moment of contraction, then gradually decrease. This latter model suggests the universe will become more orderly after the moment of contraction. The Gold model has been linked to the possibility of retrocausal change, questions concerning the preservation of information in a time-reversed universe (states of decreasing entropy), and causation in general. The Gold Universe is named after the cosmologist Thomas Gold, who proposed the model in the 1960s.
