= International Academy of Sex Research =

Scientific society for researchers in sexology

The International Academy of Sex Research (IASR) is a scientific society for researchers in sexology. According to John Bancroft, retired director of the Kinsey Institute, IASR "can claim...most of the field's leading researchers." IASR is unique among sexology organizations in that individuals must be elected to membership, which requires demonstration of substantial contribution to sexology, including the authorship of 10 or more professional publications. Notable members have included Drs. Ray Blanchard, Milton Diamond, Kurt Freund, Richard Green, Lisa Diamond, Leonore Tiefer, Judith V. Becker, and Ken Zucker. The official journal of IASR is the Archives of Sexual Behavior.

== History ==
IASR was founded on 1 August 1973. The 53 founding charter members were nominated by the board of the journal Archives of Sexual Behavior, which became the official publication of the IASR. The founding editor of Archives of Sexual Behavior was Richard Green. The current editor is Kenneth Zucker.

The first annual IASR meeting was held at the State University of New York at Stony Brook in September 1975. It was hosted by IASR founding president, Richard Green.

Presidents

- Leonore Tiefer (1993)

== See also ==
- List of sexology organizations
