= Ray Moynihan =

Australian journalist

Ray Moynihan is an Australian researcher, health journalist, documentary-maker and author. Employed for many years as an investigative journalist at the Australian Broadcasting Corporation, he has also worked for the Australian Financial Review and is currently a visiting editor at the British Medical Journal and a conjoint lecturer at the University of Newcastle. He was also a correspondent for Radio New Zealand. His stories regularly appear in the BMJ, The Australian, Crikey and the ABC.in Australia. Moynihan is a prolific public speaker.

== Early life and career ==
Moynihan grew up in Brisbane, Queensland and on graduating from the University of Queensland, worked as a reporter at community radio station 4ZZZ. He joined ABC Radio News Brisbane in the mid 1980s as a reporter, staying with the organisation for over a decade in a variety of roles including the presenter of the investigative radio program 'Background Briefing,' reporter for JJJ and the '7.30 Report' and researcher then producer at Four Corners, where he developed a strong interest in health reporting. Moynihan went on to write a number of books. He spent 1999 at Harvard University after winning a Harkness Fellowship, and now works part-time as an academic at the University of Newcastle. Moynihan lives in Byron Bay with his partner, filmmaker Miranda Burne. In 2006 Moynihan coordinated an April Fool's Joke with a health campaign about motivational deficiency disorder.

== Awards ==
- 1995 - co-recipient (with Dr Norman Swan) of the Peter Grieve Award for medical journalism
- 1996 - Michael Daley Award for excellence in science journalism
- 1998 - 1998-1999 Harkness Fellowship in health care policy

== Articles ==
- A health check for the business of medicine, 3 Sep 2010, Australian Broadcasting Corporation
- Sex drugs for women don't seem to be working, 1 Sep 2010, Australian Broadcasting Corporation

== Bibliography ==
- Too Much Medicine? The business of health and its risks for you , ABC Books, Sydney, 1998
- Selling Sickness: How drug companies are turning us all into patients, (with Alan Cassels), Allen & Unwin, Sydney, 2005
- Improving population health : the uses of systematic reviews (with Melissa Sweet), Centers for Disease Control and Prevention, Atlanta, 2007
- Ten Questions You Must Ask Your Doctor (with Melissa Sweet), Allen & Unwin, Sydney, 2008
- Sex, Lies and Pharmaceuticals: How Drug Companies Are Bankrolling The Next Big Medical Condition For Women, (with Dr Barbara Mintzes), Allen & Unwin, Sydney, 2010
