= Ronald Virag =

French cardiovascular surgeon

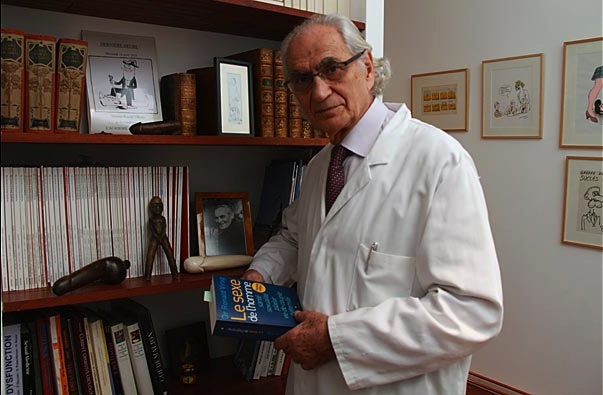
- Dr Ronald Virag (2010)
- Born: December 7, 1938 (age 87); Metz, France
- Education: MD from Paris University, with a specialization in cardiovascular surgery.
- Occupation: Cardiovascular surgeon

Ronald Virag (born December 7, 1938) is a French cardiovascular surgeon who specialises in andrology, the study of the male reproductive system. After training in general and cardiovascular surgery at Paris University, he shifted his focus to the study of erectile dysfunction, which has been his primary area of study since 1978. In 1981, he founded a private institute in France dedicated to the clinical study of erectile dysfunction and developed early programs using intracavernosal drugs to treat the condition.

== Biography ==
Ronald Virag was born in Metz, France in 1938 to Hungarian parents who had become French citizens before his birth. His father, Edmond Weiskopf (1911-1996), was a former professional soccer player. Virag attended Ecole des Roches and Lycée Janson de Sailly in Paris before entering the Faculty of Sciences and then the Faculty of Medicine at the University of Paris.

After completing his medical training, Virag became an intern and resident at Paris Public Assistance Hospitals. Afterward, he was appointed Chief Resident at the Faculty and specialized in cardiovascular surgery. He created several cardiovascular surgery units in private institutions before taking an interest in male sexual dysfunction caused by vascular diseases.

Virag developed specific techniques to explore the penile blood flow dynamics and designed various original surgical interventions, such as the penis dorsal vein arterialization which was named after him. In 1982, he discovered, almost by chance, that an old medication, papaverine injected directly into the penis, could provoke a long-lasting erection. Thus, he developed the technique of intracavernous injection, which has been used worldwide since 1983 to treat erectile dysfunction.

He was appointed as a consultant at Harvard Medical School and now teaches within various structures of French and foreign medical societies. He is a permanent member of the French National Academy of Surgery.

== Impact on treatment of erectile dysfunction ==
Until the last third of the 20th century, medicine had little interest in treating erectile dysfunction. Busy urologists would simply prescribe men a quick cure of male hormones, then send them back to the psychiatrist; because of Freud, erectile dysfunction was incorrectly thought to be caused by neurosis. It was not until the 1970s that a few pioneers developed surgical and medical techniques to help those suffering from erectile dysfunction. Ronald Virag was one of these pioneers. He was then a young chief resident at the Hospital Broussais, a Paris Public Assistance Hospital, and he took an interest in the erectile dysfunctions occurring in the patients affected by Leriche's syndrome. Urged by their despair, Virag became passionate about this problem and devoted most of his professional life to it. A small international group was formed, combining the Europeans, more focused on physiology, and the Americans, who developed the penile implant techniques. This group founded a new medical Society which today has become the International Society for Sexual Medicine (ISSM), with over a thousand members.

== Intracavernousal injection of papaverine ==
The intracavernous injection of papaverine was a turning point in the history of the treatment of erectile dysfunction. Ronald Virag, then an active member of one of the most renowned units of cardiovascular surgery in Europe, had already developed a procedure aiming to improve the blood flow in the penis. His intervention called "dorsal vein arterialization" is known in the United States as the "Virag's procedure". In 1981, during a surgical operation on the penis, he discovered that an old medication extracted from poppies, and used since the late 19th century to dilate blood vessels, could induce an erection when injected into the penis. After a year of observing the effects of papaverine on volunteers, himself being one of them, the discovery was published in the famous medical journal "Lancet". Patients rapidly saw benefits and the intracavernous injection became the standard means of triggering an erection. Since then the technique was improved for the comfort of patients, who may now use an automatic injector. Even after the rise in popularity of Viagra, the intracavernous mini injection remains the most efficient and reliable medical treatment for erectile dysfunction."

== Viagra and Virag ==
When the American pharmaceutical company Pfizer realized that a molecule tested against heart failure had positive effects on erection, Ronald Virag was immediately consulted for a first assessment, which launched research on the topic. Afterward, with a Norwegian colleague, he led the first European preliminary study of the medicine. In 1999, he was part of the task force appointed by the French Ministry of Health. He was also consulted that same year by the National Ethics Advisory Council.

== Prizes and awards ==
In 1985, the American Urology Association presented him the John Lattimer prize (a unique fact for a doctor nonspecialized in urology and non-American), awarding a discovery that changed the course of the specialty. The association then lauded his discovery of the intracavernous injection as one of the most important discoveries of the century in the urology and andrology fields. In 1997, he was honored by the European Society for Sexual Medicine for the entirety of his works. Brazilian, Portuguese, Spanish, and Greek medical societies honored him as well. He was elected associate member, then a permanent member of the French National Surgery Academy (2012).

== Bibliography ==
- Papavérine et Impuissance (Les Editions du CERI) 1987
- L'Homme qui Marche (Table Ronde) 1990
- Le Sexe de l'Homme (Albin Michel et Poche) 1997, 2001
- La pilule de l'Erection et votre sexualité (Albin Michel) 1998
- Histoires de Pénis (Albin Michel) 2003
- Les Injections intracaverneuses (John Libbey-Eurotext) 2004
- Le Sexe de l'Homme nouvelle edition (Albin Michel) 2011

eBooks:

- Erection, the user's guide (Editions Clément) May 2013
