= Disease mongering =

Pejorative term for expanding a disease's market for treatment

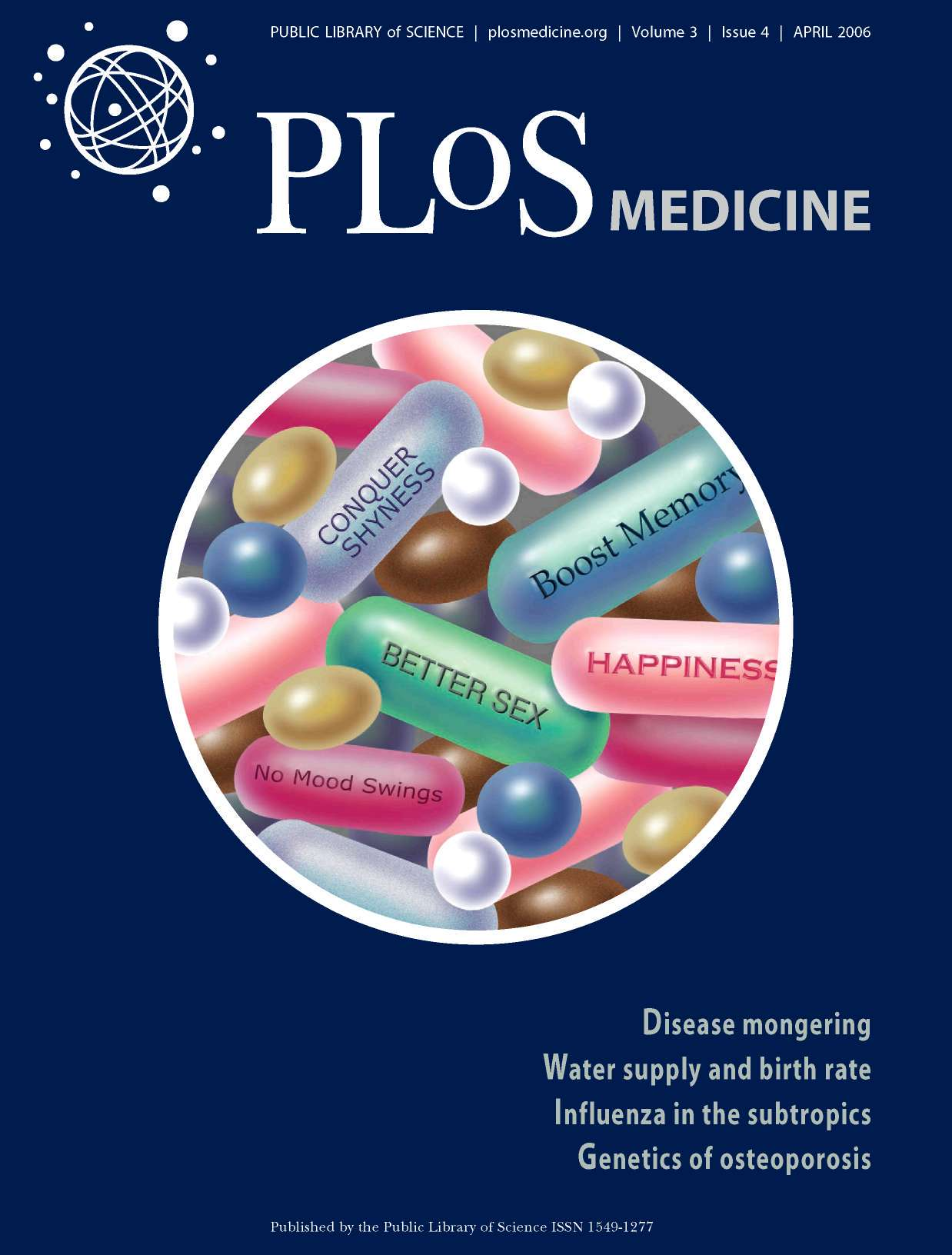
A collection of articles on disease mongering in PLoS Medicine (2006)

Disease mongering is a pejorative term for the practice of widening the diagnostic boundaries of illnesses and aggressively promoting their public awareness in order to expand the markets for treatment.

Among the entities benefiting from selling and delivering treatments are pharmaceutical companies, physicians, alternative practitioners and other professional or consumer organizations. It is distinct from the promulgation of bogus or unrecognised diagnoses.

== Term ==
The term "monger" has ancient roots, providing the basis for many common compound forms such as cheesemonger, fishmonger, rumor monger and fleshmonger, for those who peddle such wares respectively. "Disease mongering" as a label for the "invention" or promotion of diseases in order to capitalize on their treatment was first used in 1992 by health writer Lynn Payer, who applied it to the Listerine mouthwash campaign against halitosis (bad breath).

Payer defined disease mongering as a set of practices which include the following:

- Stating that normal human experiences are abnormal and in need of treatment
- Claiming to recognize suffering which is not present
- Defining a disease such that a large number of people have it
- Defining a disease's cause as some ambiguous deficiency or hormonal imbalance
- Associating a disease with a public relations spin campaign
- Directing the framing of public discussion of a disease
- Intentionally misusing statistics to exaggerate treatment benefits
- Setting a dubious clinical endpoint in research
- Advertising a treatment as without side effect
- Advertising a common symptom as a serious disease

The incidence of conditions not previously defined as illness being medicalised as "diseases" is difficult to scientifically assess due to the inherent social and political nature of the definition of what constitutes a disease, and what aspects of the human condition should be managed according to a medical model. For example, halitosis, the condition which prompted Payer to coin the phrase "disease mongering", isn't merely an imagined social stigma but can stem from any of a wide spectrum of conditions spanning from bacterial infection of the gums to kidney failure, and is recognized by the Scientific Council of the American Dental Association as "a recognizable condition which deserves professional attention".

== Examples ==
Australian journalist Ray Moynihan has argued that the pharmaceutical industry engages in disease mongering to enlarge its profits, and that it harms citizens. His use of osteoporosis as an example of a "made up" disease in this article prompted an angry retort from the president of the British National Osteoporosis Society, stating that the article was insulting to people with osteoporosis and vastly understated the risk of disabling fractures associated with the disorder. Moynihan published a satire of disease mongering in the 2006 April Fool's Day issue of BMJ titled "Scientists find new disease: motivational deficiency disorder".

Other conditions which have been cited as examples of disease mongering include: restless leg syndrome, testosterone deficiency, erectile dysfunction, sluggish cognitive tempo, Lyme disease, and hypoactive sexual desire disorder. Some of these conditions are recognized as medical disorders by professional medical societies and the National Institute of Health and Clinical Excellence. In 2014, an FDA advisory committee voted to limit the use of testosterone replacement therapy products due to potentially increased cardiovascular risk associated with their use.

A 2006 Newcastle, New South Wales international conference, reported in PLoS Medicine, explored the phenomenon of disease mongering.

== See also ==
- Inverse benefit law – Drug benefit-harm ratio falls with marketing
- Medicalization – Categorization of human problems as medical
- Medicalization of sexuality – Medical authority over sexual experiences
- Quaternary prevention
- Schooliosis – Misdiagnosis of scoliosis – an example of disease mongering due to overdiagnosis
