= Overdiagnosis =

Diagnosis of disease that will never cause symptoms or death during a patient's lifetime

Overdiagnosis is the diagnosis of disease that will never cause symptoms or death during a patient's ordinarily expected lifetime and thus presents no practical threat regardless of being pathologic. Overdiagnosis is a side effect of screening for early forms of disease. Although screening saves lives in some cases, in others it may turn people into patients unnecessarily and may lead to treatments that do no good and perhaps do harm. Given the tremendous variability that is normal in biology, it is inherent that the more one screens, the more incidental findings will generally be found. For a large percentage of them, the most appropriate medical response is to recognize them as something that does not require intervention; but determining which action a particular finding warrants ("ignoring", watchful waiting, or intervention) can be very difficult, whether because the differential diagnosis is uncertain or because the risk ratio is uncertain (risks posed by intervention, namely, adverse events, versus risks posed by not intervening).

Overdiagnosis occurs when a disease is diagnosed correctly, but the diagnosis is irrelevant. A correct diagnosis may be irrelevant because treatment for the disease is not available, not needed, or not wanted. Some people contend that the term "overdiagnosis" is inappropriate, and that "overtreatment" is more representative of the phenomenon.

Because most people who are diagnosed are also treated, it is difficult to assess whether overdiagnosis has occurred in an individual. Overdiagnosis in an individual cannot be determined during life. Overdiagnosis is only certain when an individual remains untreated, never develops symptoms of the disease and dies of something else. The distinction of "died with disease" versus "died of disease" is then important and relevant. Thus most of the inferences about overdiagnosis comes from the study of populations. Rapidly rising rates of testing and disease diagnosis in the setting of stable rates of the feared outcome of the disease (e.g. death) are highly suggestive of overdiagnosis. Most compelling, however, is evidence from a randomized trial of a screening test intended to detect pre-clinical disease. A persistent excess of detected disease in the tested group years after the trial is completed constitutes the best evidence that overdiagnosis has occurred.

Although overdiagnosis is potentially applicable to the diagnosis of any disease, the concept was first recognized and studied in cancer screening—the systematic evaluation of asymptomatic patients to detect early forms of cancer. The central harm of cancer screening is overdiagnosis—the detection of abnormalities that meet the pathologic definition of cancer (under the microscope) but will never progress to cause symptoms or death during a patient's ordinarily expected lifetime.

In advanced age, such as 65 years or older, the concept of overdiagnosis takes on increasing importance as life expectancy decreases. There are various cancer types for which a standard contraindication to screening is life expectancy of less than 10 years, for the simple and logical reason that a person who already has medically complex health status (e.g., multiple comorbidities) and realistically can probably expect to live for less than 10 years is less likely to get a net benefit (balance of benefit versus harms) from diagnosing and treating that cancer, especially if it may be indolent anyway. Prostate cancer is a classic example, but the concept can apply to breast cancer and other types as well.

== Overdiagnosis and the variability of cancer progression ==
Cancer screening is the effort to detect cancer early, during its pre-clinical phase—the time period that begins with an abnormal cell and ends when the patient notices symptoms from the cancer. It has long been known that some people have cancers with short pre-clinical phases (fast-growing, aggressive cancers), while others have cancers with long pre-clinical phases (slow-growing cancers). And this heterogeneity has an unfortunate implication: namely, screening tends to disproportionately detect slow-growing cancers (because they are accessible to be detected for a long period of time) and disproportionately miss the fast-growing cancers (because they are only accessible to be detected for a short period of time)—the very cancers we would most like to catch. For more information, see Screening (medicine)#Length time bias.

This long-standing model has a hidden assumption: namely, that all cancers inevitably progress. But some pre-clinical cancers will not progress to cause problems for patients. And if screening (or testing for some other reason) detects these cancers, overdiagnosis has occurred.

The figure below depicts the heterogeneity of cancer progression using 4 arrows to represent 4 categories of cancer progression.

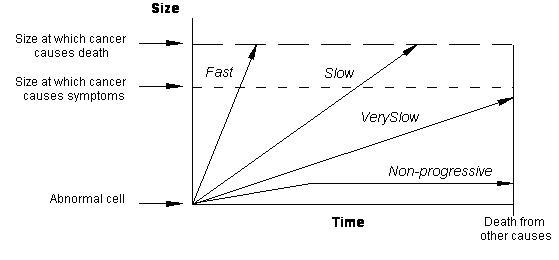
Cancer screening is most useful in detecting slowly progressing cancers but can cause overdiagnosis if very slow or non-progressive cancers are detected.

The arrow labeled "Fast" represents a fast-growing cancer, one that quickly leads to symptoms and to death. These are the worst forms of cancer and unfortunately often appear in the interval between screening tests. The arrow labeled "Slow" represents a slow-growing cancer, one that leads to symptoms and death but only after many years. These are the cancers for which screening has arguably the greatest beneficial impact.

The arrow labeled "Very Slow" represents a cancer that never causes problems because it is growing very slowly. If a cancer grows slowly enough, then patients will die of some other cause before the cancer gets big enough to produce symptoms.

The arrow labeled "Non-progressive" represents a cancer that never causes problems because it is not growing at all. In other words, there are cellular abnormalities that meet the pathologic definition of cancer but never grow to cause symptoms—alternatively, they may grow and then regress. Although the concept of non-progressive cancers may seem implausible, basic scientists have begun to uncover biologic mechanisms that halt the progression of cancer. Some cancers outgrow their blood supply (and are starved), others are recognized by the host's immune system (and are successfully contained), and some are not that aggressive in the first place.

Cancer that grows too slowly to be likely to harm the patient is usually referred to as a benign tumor. Although some types of benign tumor may require intervention, they are often simply monitored for malignant transformation.

== Evidence for overdiagnosis in cancer ==
The phenomenon of overdiagnosis is most widely understood in prostate cancer. A dramatic increase in the number of new cases of prostate cancer was observed following the introduction of the PSA (prostate-specific antigen) screening test. Because of the problem of overdiagnosis, most organizations recommend against prostate cancer screening in men with limited life expectancy—generally defined as less than 10 years (see also prostate cancer screening).

Overdiagnosis has been identified in mammographic screening for breast cancer. Long-term follow-up of the Malmo randomized trial of mammography found a persistent excess of 115 breast cancers in the screened group 15 years after the trial was completed (a 10% rate of overdiagnosis). In a letter to the editor, authors not associated with the original study of the data from the randomized clinical trial argued that one-quarter of mammographically detected breast cancers represent overdiagnosis. A systematic review of mammography screening programs reported an overdiagnosis rate of around 50%, which is the same of saying that a third of diagnosed cases of breast cancer are overdiagnosed.

Overdiagnosis has also been identified in chest x-ray screening for lung cancer. Long-term follow-up of the Mayo Clinic randomized trial of screening with chest x-rays and sputum cytology found a persistent excess of 46 lung cancer cases in the screened group 13 years after the trial was completed, suggesting that 20–40% of lung cancers detected by conventional x-ray screening represent overdiagnosis. There is considerable evidence that the problem of overdiagnosis is much greater for lung cancer screening using spiral CT scans.

Overdiagnosis has also been associated with early detection in a variety of other cancers, including neuroblastoma, melanoma, and thyroid cancer. In fact, some degree of overdiagnosis in cancer early detection is probably the rule, not the exception.

== Evidence for overdiagnosis of infectious diseases ==
Issues with overdiagnosis of infectious diseases, such as malaria or typhoid fever, persist in many regions around the world. For example, malaria overdiagnosis is well-documented in African countries. and results in over-inflation of actual malaria rates reported at the local and national levels. Health facilities tend to over-diagnose malaria in patients presenting with symptoms such as fever, due to traditional perceptions (for example any fever being equivalent to malaria) and issues related to laboratory testing (see Diagnosis of malaria). Therefore, malaria overdiagnosis leads to under-management of other fever-inducing conditions, but also to over-prescription of antimalarial drugs.

== Harms of overdiagnosis ==
Overdiagnosed patients cannot benefit from the detection and treatment of their "cancer" because the cancer was never destined to cause symptoms or death. They can only be harmed. There are three categories of harm associated with overdiagnosis:

1. Physical effects of unnecessary diagnosis and treatment: All medical interventions have side effects. This is particularly true of cancer treatments. Surgery, radiation and chemotherapy all pose varying morbidity and mortality risks.
2. Psychological effects: there is a burden for an individual simply being labeled as "diseased" (e.g. the burden of being labeled a "cancer patient") and an associated increased sense of vulnerability.
3. Economic burden: Not only the associated cost of treatment (from which the patient cannot benefit, because the disease posed no threat), but also—at least, in the current health care system in the United States—a potential increase in the cost of health insurance or even an inability to procure it (e.g. the diagnosis creates a pre-existing condition that affects health insurance). Similar issues may arise with life insurance. Unlike health insurance, life insurance does not fall under the scope of the Affordable Care Act, thus insurers have even more leeway in denying or reducing coverage or inflating premiums due to the patient's condition.

While many identify false positive results as the major downside to cancer screening, there are data to suggest that—when patients are informed about overdiagnosis—they are much more concerned about overdiagnosis than false positive results.

== Distinction among overdiagnosis, misdiagnosis, and false positive results ==
Overdiagnosis is often confused with the term "false positive" test results and with misdiagnosis, but they are three distinct concepts. A false positive test result refers to a test that suggests the presence of disease, but is ultimately proved to be in error (usually by a second, more precise test). Patients with false positive test results may be told that they have a disease and erroneously treated; overdiagnosed patients are told they have disease and generally receive treatment. Misdiagnosed patients do not have the condition at all, or have a totally different condition, but are treated anyway.

Overdiagnosis is also distinct from overtesting. Overtesting is the phenomenon where patients receive a medical test that they do not need; it will not benefit them. For instance, a patient that receives a lumbar spine x-ray when they have low back pain without any sinister signs or symptoms (weight loss, fever, lower limb paresthesia, etc.) and symptoms have been present for less than 4 weeks. Most tests are subject to overtesting, but echocardiograms (ultrasounds of the heart) have been shown to be particularly prone to overtesting. The detection of overtesting is difficult; recently, many population-level estimates have emerged to try to detect potential overtesting. The most common of these estimates is geographical variation in test use. These estimates detect regions, hospitals or general practices that order many more tests, compared to their peers, irrespective of differences in patient demographics between regions. Further methods that have been used include identifying general practices that order a higher proportion of tests that return a normal result, and the identification of tests with large temporal increases in their use, without a justifiable reason.

	Overdiagnosis	False Positive Results	Misdiagnosis
Definition	Detection of a "disease" that will never cause symptoms or death during a patient's lifetime	A "false alarm"—an initial test result that suggests the presence of disease, but later proved false (no disease is present)	Diagnosis of a disease that the patient does not in fact have (either they do not have a condition, or they have a different condition)
Patient experience	Told they have the disease	Told that the test was wrong and they do not have the disease (usually after being first told they have the disease or at least may have it)	Told they have the disease
Physician action	Generally, initiates treatment	Reassurance	Generally, initiates treatment
Potential Harms	Physical effects: Side effects and mortality risk from treatments that cannot help the patient (because they did not need help); Psychological effects: labeled as "diseased" and increased sense of vulnerability; Economic burden: Treatment costs	Physical effects: Discomfort and complications from invasive diagnostic tests; Psychological effects: Short-term anxiety associated with near miss (e.g. "cancer scare"); Economic burden: Cost of diagnostic testing	Physical effects: Side effects and mortality risk from treatments that cannot help the patient (because they did not need those treatments). If symptoms or abnormal lab findings are instead caused by a different condition, misdiagnosis can result in failure to provide treatment for the patient's actual condition, causing preventable suffering or even death.; Psychological effects: labeled as "diseased" and increased sense of vulnerability, or, in case of a different condition, failure to alleviate symptoms, resulting in frustration and lack of trust for medical professionals; Economic burden: Treatment costs for unnecessary treatment, and in cases of a different condition, failure to treat the correct condition may result in more expensive complications and more missed work days, or even permanent disability.

== Solutions to overdiagnosis ==
The concept of undiagnosing is a strategy to review diagnostic labels and remove those that are unnecessary or no longer beneficial. It is important that the medical record is updated to reflect the removal of the diagnosis.

=== Removing cancer from names of low-risk diagnoses ===
It has been proposed that some conditions that are indolent (i.e., unlikely to cause appreciable harm during the patient's lifetime) should have the words "cancer" or "carcinoma" removed from their accepted/preferred medical name. Such a proposal is to name conditions as indolent lesions of epithelial origin or IDLE.

== Medical complexity ==
If a person is medically complex (multiple comorbidities) and may expect to live for less than ten years, then there may be a net harm (benefit less harm) in diagnosing and treating one or more of their morbidities, e.g. prostate cancer. The principal, however, can apply to all cancers and other illnesses.

== See also ==
- Disease mongering – Pejorative term for expanding a disease's market for treatment
- False positive – Types of error in data reporting
- Medicalization – Categorization of human problems as medical
- Interventionism (medicine)
- Patient education – Teaching or training of patients concerning their own health needs
- Schooliosis – Misdiagnosis of scoliosis
- Screening (medicine) – Brief medical evaluation to detect unnoticed health problems
