= Erotic massage =

Massage of erogenous zones for sexual arousal or orgasm

Erotic massage is the use of massage techniques by one person on another person's erogenous zones for their sexual pleasure. The process may achieve or enhance the recipient's sexual excitation or arousal and sometimes achieve orgasm. The person providing the massage is called a masseur (male) or masseuse (female). Massages have been used for medical purposes for a very long time, and their use for erotic purposes also has a long history. In the case of women, the two focal areas are the abdomens and mons pubis, while in case of men, the focal areas are the male breast muscles and nipples, male genitals, the anus, and the prostate. When the massage is of a partner's genitals (manual sex), the act is usually referred to as a handjob for penises and fingering for vulvas.

Erotic massage is sometimes used as part of sex, either as foreplay, the final sex act, or as part of sex therapy. There is also a large commercial erotic massage industry, which may call their establishments massage parlours, spas, or saunas.

== Commercial erotic and sexual massage ==
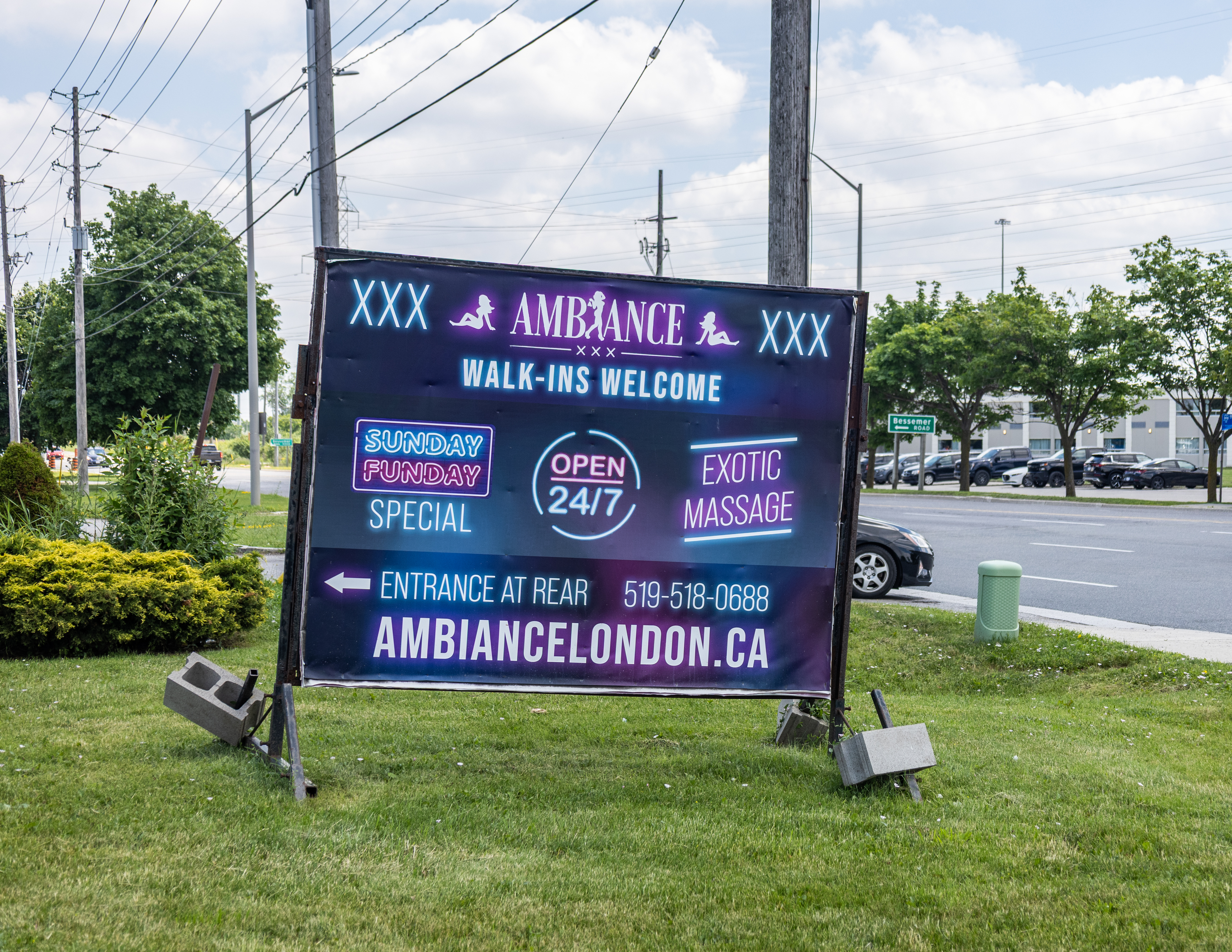
A roadside sign for a commercial erotic massage parlor in Canada

An erotic and sexual massage may be provided by independent providers or providers of broader sexual services, through erotic massage agencies, or by organized massage parlors or brothels. It takes many forms, from massage techniques that aim to integrate the sexual, spiritual, and physical, to massages with the purpose of achieving orgasm through a handjob, oral sex, or sexual intercourse.

A mix of modalities might be used: Swedish, deep tissue, tantric, sensual touch, breathwork, energy work, or guided connection practices. It's about tuning into the body and what it needs, both physically and emotionally.

A "happy ending" is the colloquial term for the practice of a provider offering sexual release to a client. As a result, built-up sexual tension is released, leading to a feeling of full-body relaxation and happiness at the end. The massage aiming for such an outcome is called "happy ending massage". This is sometimes offered as an addition to any other type of massage, typically in the form of a handjob. The 2009 documentary Happy Endings? follows women who worked in Asian massage parlors in Rhode Island. The film focuses on "full service" massage parlors, although "rub and tug" massage parlors (where only handjobs are offered) are also covered. Prostitution in Rhode Island was legal at the time of filming.

== Legality ==
In many jurisdictions, an erotic and sexual massage is regarded as a sexual service, the legality of which varies between jurisdictions. In some jurisdictions, an erotic massage may be legal, while prostitution may not be.

== Sex therapy ==
Erotic massage may be used in sex therapy as a means of stimulating the libido or increasing the ability of a person to respond positively to sensual stimulus. In some cases, erotic massage can be a form of foreplay without sexual gratification, intended to heighten the sensitivity of an individual prior to another engagement where sexual arousal and fulfillment is intended. In other cases, erotic massage may be used professionally to help men address issues of premature ejaculation.

== Use in medicine ==
=== Alleged practice by midwives ===
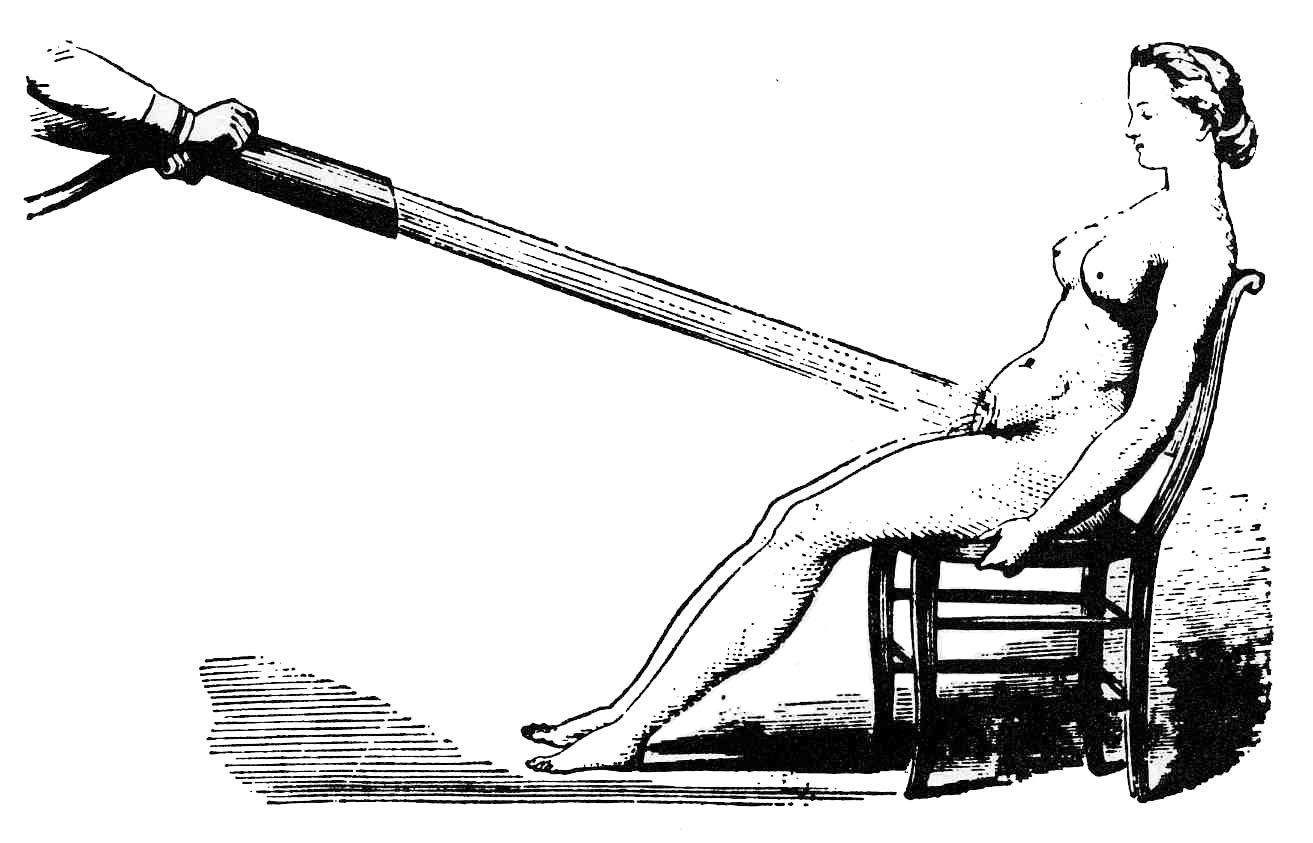
French pelvic douche, c. 1860

According to Rachel P. Maines, in the Western medical tradition, genital massage of a woman to orgasm by a physician or midwife was a standard treatment for female hysteria, an ailment considered common and chronic in women. In 1653, Pieter van Foreest advised the technique of genital massage for a disease called "womb disease" to bring the woman into "hysterical paroxysm". Such cases were quite profitable for physicians, since the patients were at no risk of death but needed constant treatment. However, the vaginal massage procedure (generally referred to as "pelvic massage") was tedious and time-consuming for physicians. The technique was difficult for a physician to master and could take hours to achieve "hysterical paroxysm". Referral to midwives, which had been common practice, meant a loss of business for the physician, and, at times, husbands were asked to assist.

However, Maines' depiction has been contested by other scholars, including Helen King, and Hallie Lieberman and Eric Schatzberg, claiming the idea is false. In reality, many practitioners of the pelvic massage were aware of the possibility of a sexual stimulation during the procedure and, like the Finnish physician Georg Asp (1834–1901), made it clear that the sexual excitation shall be circumvented and the clitoris studiously avoided.

=== Development of the vibrator ===
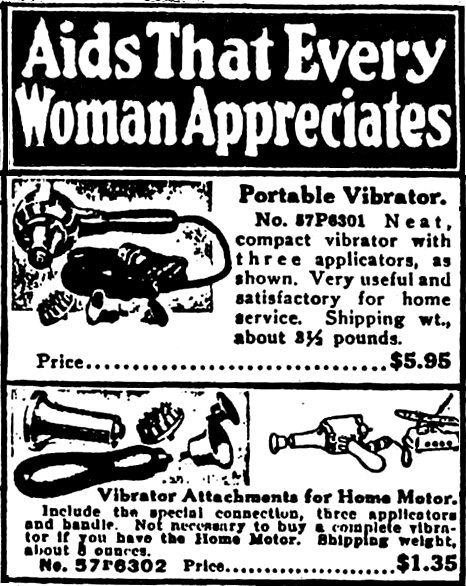
A 1918 Sears, Roebuck and Co. ad with several models of vibrators

A solution was the invention of massage devices, which shortened the needed treatment from hours to minutes, removing the need for midwives and increasing a physician's treatment capacity. Already at the turn of the century, hydrotherapy devices were available at Bath, and by the mid-19th century, they were popular at many high-profile bathing resorts across Europe and in America. By 1870, a clockwork-driven vibrator was available for physicians. In 1873, the first electromechanical vibrator was used at an asylum in France for the treatment of hysteria. While physicians of the period acknowledged that the disorder stemmed from sexual dissatisfaction, they seemed unaware of or unwilling to admit the sexual purposes of the devices used to treat it. In fact, the introduction of the speculum was far more controversial than that of the vibrator. By the turn of the 20th century, the spread of home electricity brought the vibrator to the consumer market. The appeal of cheaper treatment in the privacy of one's own home understandably made the vibrator a popular early home appliance. In fact, the electric home vibrator was on the market before many other home appliance "essentials": nine years before the electric vacuum cleaner and 10 years before the electric iron. A page from a Sears catalog of home electrical appliances from 1918 includes a portable vibrator with attachments, billed as "very useful and satisfactory for home service". In the 21st century, app-controlled vibrators were introduced, enabling remote use via smartphones. Companies including Lovense and similar developed wireless models with adjustable vibration patterns.

== See also ==
- Nuru (massage)
- Prostate massage
- Tantra massage
