= Eddie Tabash =

American lawyer

Edward Tabash
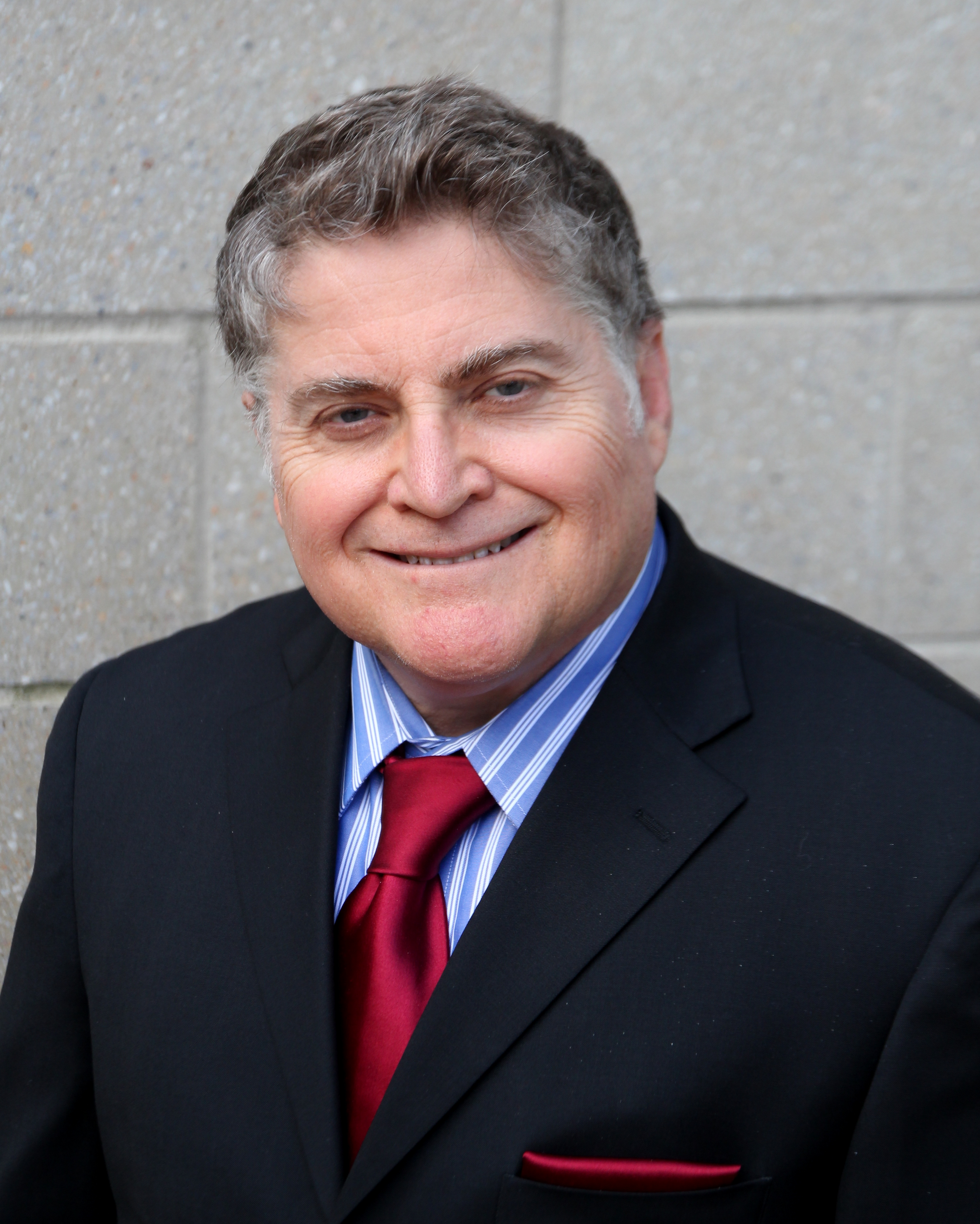
- Tabash at CFI 2013
- Education: magna cum laude from UCLA (JD)
- Eddie Tabash Voice recorded in March 2017
- Website: http://www.tabash.com/

Edward Tabash is an American lawyer and political and social activist. He is an atheist, a proponent of the Establishment Clause. He chairs the Board of Directors for the Center for Inquiry. Tabash has represented the atheist position in debates against several world-renowned religious philosophers and apologists, including William Lane Craig, Peter van Inwagen, J.P. Moreland, Greg Bahnsen, Mohammad Hijab, and Richard Swinburne.

== Early life ==
Tabash graduated magna cum laude from UCLA in 1973 and obtained a J.D. degree from Loyola Law School of Los Angeles in 1976. His father was an Orthodox rabbi from Lithuania and his mother was an Auschwitz survivor from Hungary.

Tabash told D.J. Grothe in a 2007 interview when asked if he could sympathize with people's search for God, Tabash states, "I was a new age spiritual seeker for 25 years... I'm sympathetic with the yearning for some kind of immortality... But that does not mean it's true, and it doesn't mean that God beliefs are harmless." He remembers the stories his rabbi father used to tell at Passover about the miracles God performed in order to get Pharaoh to allow the Jews their freedom. In turn, his mother told him stories from Auschwitz, and Tabash, even as a boy, could not understand why God would perform astounding miracles to rescue His people from a lesser tyrant, but be unwilling to perform miracles to rescue them from a far more murderous tyrant.

== Career ==
Tabash is a member of the California State Bar, the American Bar Association, the Los Angeles County Bar Association, and the Beverly Hills Bar Association. He also chairs the First Amendment Task Force for the Council for Secular Humanism. Tabash has written amicus briefs urging the separation of church and state, in cases before the Supreme Court of the United States and the California State Supreme Court and the California Court of Appeal. Tabash works in the Los Angeles area.

Tabash believes in personal freedom. His views include advocacy of the decriminalization of prostitution, free speech, "Blasphemy is a human right", abortion rights, and the separation of church and state. He also supports the International Sex Worker Foundation for Art, Culture and Education (ISWFACE), and the Internet Infidels. He currently chairs the Legal Committee of Americans United for Separation of Church and State. In November 2012 he was chosen as chair of the boards of directors of the Center for Inquiry, the Committee for Skeptical Inquiry and the Council for Secular Humanism.

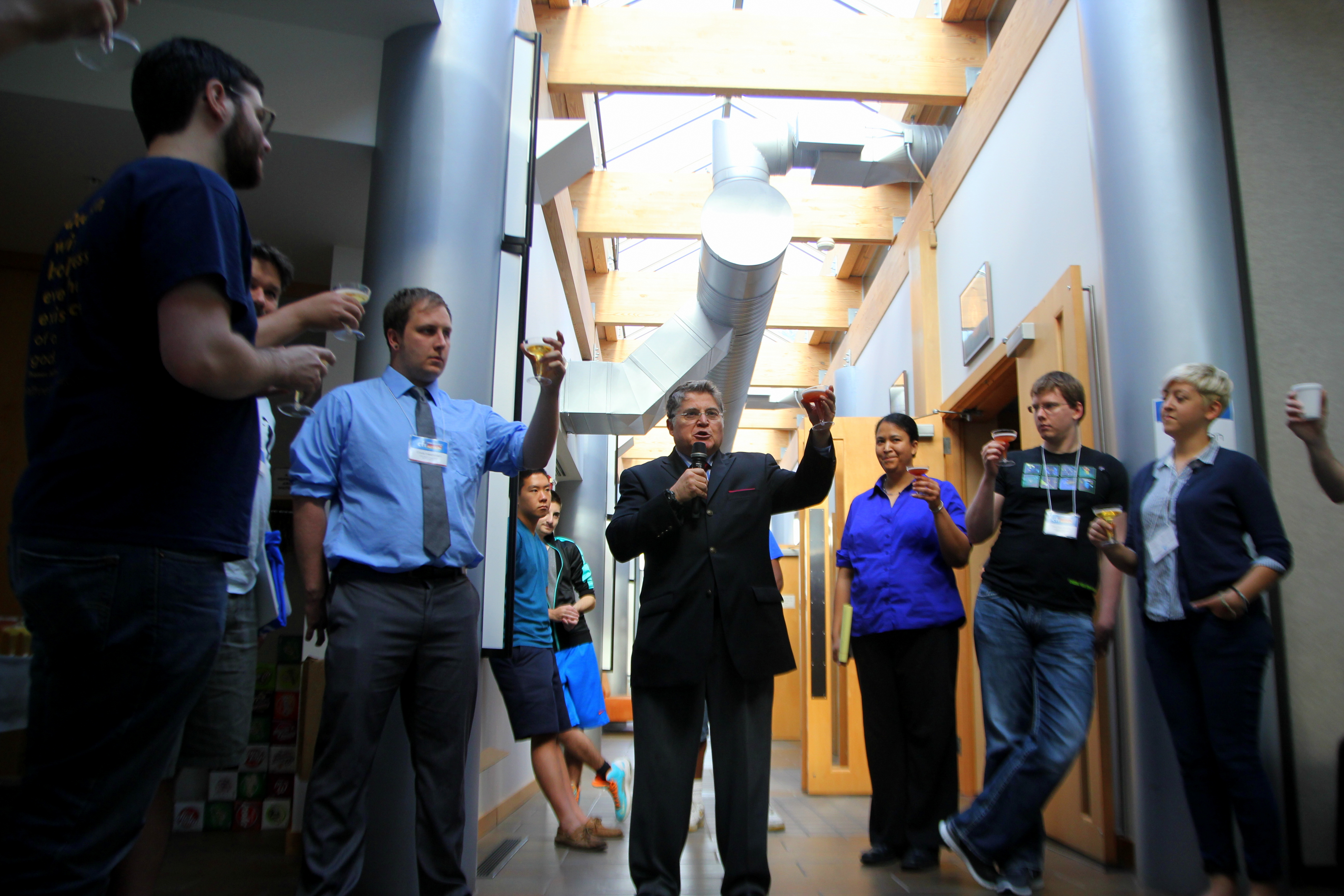
Tabash gives opening toast at Center for Inquiry Student Leadership Conference 2013

From 1981 through 1998, Tabash actively debated numerous professional anti-abortion opponents in the abortion rights movement in California. He was, during that time, the primary public speaker and debater for the Southern California branch of the California Abortion and Reproductive Rights Action League.

In 1994, Tabash finished second out of six in the Democratic primary for the California State Assembly in the 41st Assembly District. In 2000, Tabash finished second out of four in the Democratic Primary for the California State Assembly in the 55th Assembly District.

Tabash is a firm supporter of equal rights for all people, religious or non-religious and had once stated, that:

"No American can officially be valued more or less than anyone else because of either adhering to or rejecting a tenet of religion belief or nonbelief... The separation of church and state is one of those magnificent issues that can help to unify a very severe breach in our country because its aim is to protect both believers and nonbelievers equally... My ultimate aim is to persuade overwhelming majorities of people to abandon any prejudices they harbor against atheists and to view nonbelief as just one more respectable alternative among existing viewpoints on matters of religion."

He has been concerned about how religious fundamentalist beliefs of all kinds have been used, throughout human history, to deny women their rightful equality, "No person should lose her or his freedom because of someone else's religious beliefs. Only those actions that can be demonstrated by empirical evidence to warrant sanctions, independently of religious dogma, should be punished." He also believes that this same mode of religious fundamentalism has been used to deny equal rights to members of the LGBT community. "There is not one proposed piece of legislation that would deny gays and lesbians equal rights that is not grounded in religious dogma". "The most precious freedom of conscience, the most precious and valued... right to determine one's own ideas about how the universe was formed should not be touched at all by the heavy oppressive hand of government, but should be left to the realm of individual freedom. All of these are in jeopardy because of the religious right wing." "Americans have to understand that there is a difference between one's personal view as to whether there is a supreme being--and what such a being requires of us--and what the law of the land should be."
