= Zorica Mršević =

Serbian professor

- Born: October 7, 1954; Belgrade, Serbia

Zorica Mršević (born October 7, 1954) is a Serbian professor, jurist, researcher and human rights activist. She works in the field of human rights and feminism, at local and international levels.

Mrsevic is the author of more than 20 books and 300 studies and articles on gender equality, phenomenology of violence, human rights of marginalized groups and jurisprudence.

== Career ==
After graduating from the University of Belgrade School of Law in 1977, she earned an LLM degree in 1983, followed by a PhD degree in Law in 1986 from the University of Belgrade.

In 1978 and 1979 Mrsevic was a professor at the Second Belgrade's High School of Economics, Belgrade, Serbia, teaching courses Constitutional Law and Economy Law. In 1979 she joined the Institute for Criminological and Sociological Research Belgrade, Serbia, progressing from assistant to higher researcher - managing the Institute's projects, participating in the Institute's managerial bodies.

In 1992 Mrsevic joined the Centre for Women's Studies, Alternative studies of the University of Belgrade, School of Law, as a visiting professor in Course in Feminist Legal Theory. In 1996 she was a visiting professor at the Law School, State University of Iowa, Iowa City, United States, teaching Comparative Feminist Legal Theory.

In 1999 Zorica Mrsevic was appointed as a senior research fellow at the Institute of Social Science, Belgrade, Serbia. In 2000, she was a regional project manager at Oxfam GB, Belgrade, Serbia, working as Regional Women’s Program Officer and managing regional and national women's projects.

In 2001-2008 she was a gender advisor in OSCE Mission to Belgrade, managing multiple projects:

- Establish local mechanisms for gender equality
- Education for local gender equality mechanisms
- Empowerment of women for political participation
- Draft laws and other legal documents on gender equality and antidiscrimination
- Provision of expert support to national mechanisms for gender equality on provincial and republic level.

In 2002-2005 she was a visiting professor at the Central European University Budapest, Hungary, teaching Theory of Violence and Women’s Human Rights, the topics that she also taught in 2005 and 2006 at Rosa Mayreder College Vienna, Austria.

Starting from 2008 Zorica Mrsevic teaches at the Faculty for European Legal and Political Studies in Novi Sad, Serbia.

During 2008-2011 she was Deputy Ombudsman in charge of gender equality and rights of people with disabilities of Serbia in charge of citizen petitions in domain of gender equality, rights of LGBT persons, people with disabilities, elderly persons, patients and pension and labour rights.

In 2010 Mrsevic was appointed as a member of the Expert Counselling Board of the State Commissioner for Equality of Serbia in charge of gender equality and LGBT rights. In 2011 she also joined Judiciary Academy in Belgrade as a visiting professor, teaching Multiple Discrimination and Violence Against Women to judges, prosecutors and judiciary candidates.

Also in 2011 Mrsevic became a member of Gender Equality Council to the Government of Serbia. She was a member of an observatory body for monitoring violence against women.

Currently, Mrsevic is also a visiting professor at the Faculty for Political Sciences Women's Department.

== Selected bibliography ==
=== Books ===
- Mršević, Zorica (1997). Incest između mita i stvarnosti : kriminološka studija seksualnog zlostavljanja dece. Belgrade, Serbia: Inštitut za kriminološka i sociološka istraživanja. (summary in English)
- Mršević, Zorica (1998). Challenges of independent judiciary. Belgrade, Serbia: Ministry of Justice of Republic of Serbia. (summary in English)
- Mršević, Zorica (2007). Ka demokratskom društvu: izborni sistem kvota (Towards democratic society: freedom of public assembly: quota election system). Institut društvenih nauka. ISBN 978-86-7093-115-2.
- Mršević, Zorica (2009). Towards democratic society: same sex families. Belgrade, Serbia: Institute of Social Sciences Research. ISBN 9788670931282. COBIS.SR-ID 168990476
- Mršević, Zorica (2010). Towards democratic society: gender equality. Belgrade, Serbia: Institute of Social Sciences Research. ISBN 9788670931381. COBISS.SR-ID 185571340

=== Journal articles ===
- Mršević, Zorica; Hughes, Donna M.; Mladjenović, Lepa (November 1995). "Feminist resistance in Serbia". European Journal of Women's Studies. 2 (4): 509–532. doi:10.1177/135050689500200406. Pdf.
- Mršević, Zorica; Hughes, Donna M. (April 1997). "Violence against women in Belgrade, Serbia: SOS Hotline 1990-1993". Violence Against Women. 3 (2): 101–128. doi:10.1177/1077801297003002002. PMID 12294810.
