= Joanne Giannini =

American politician (born 1953)

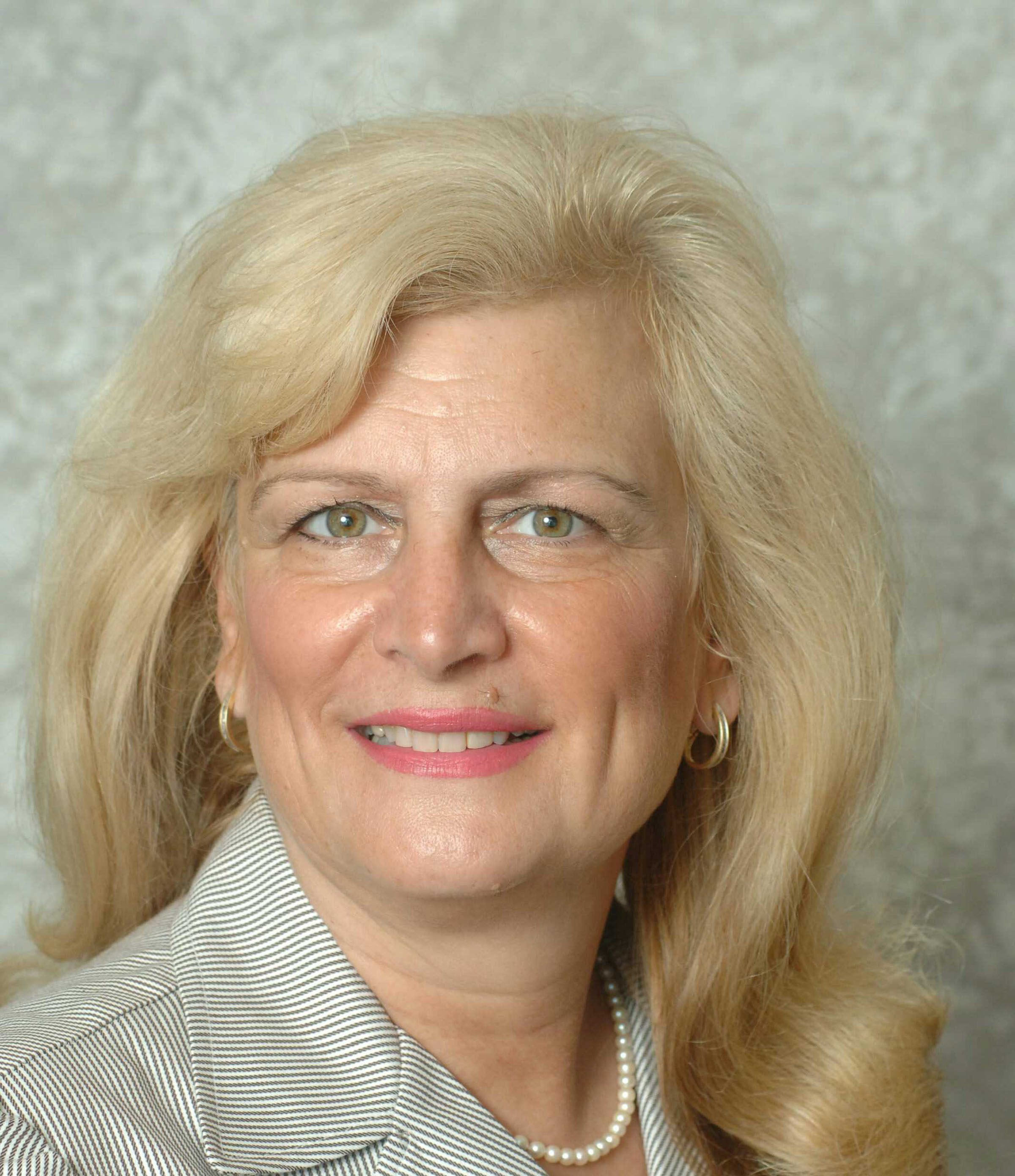

Member of the Rhode Island House of Representatives from the 7th district
- In office January 3, 1995 – January 4, 2011
- Preceded by: Patrick J. Kennedy
- Succeeded by: Maria Cimini

Personal details
- Born: March 12, 1953 (age 73) Providence, Rhode Island, U.S.
- Party: Democratic
- Spouse: Stephen

Joanne Giannini (born March 15, 1953) is an American politician who was a Democratic member of the Rhode Island House of Representatives, representing District 7 (Providence) from 1994 till 2010. On July 2, 2010, she announced she would not run for reelection.

== Legislation ==
Beginning in 2005, Joanne Giannini became the leading proponent to change the prostitution law in Rhode Island, every year submitting bills to close what she termed the legal "loophole" that allowed indoor prostitution. "Rape behind closed doors, is that permissible? Is murder permissible if it's done behind closed doors?", she asked. Critics of her bills have argued that "In Joanne Giannini's world, prostitution and human trafficking are synonymous, and every prostitute is a victim, not an individual making a personal choice." Giannini addressed the issue in her appearance in the 2009 documentary Happy Endings?, concerning the lives of the women in the Asian massage parlors in the center of the debate to re-criminalize prostitution. Giannini's bill was signed into law in November 2009.

Another loophole in Rhode Island laws was discovered in July 2009 when a 16-year-old runaway girl from Boston was found working at a strip club in Providence. Shortly after that, Joanne Giannini introduced a bill to ban minors from working in strip clubs in Rhode Island. Her bill was successfully passed and signed into law a few months later.

In January 2010, Representative Joanne Giannini introduced legislation that would make it illegal for Rhode Island drivers to use cell phones without a hands-free device. Representative Peter F. Kilmartin introduced similar legislation. These bills are currently being studied.

== Issues ==
In March and April 2010, Rhode Island experienced significant flooding, which closed many businesses throughout the state, including the Warwick Mall. As chairperson of the House Finance Committee panel, Giannini expressed this concern about unemployed workers: "I'm looking to see what else we can do" to reduce backlogs and delays that unemployed people are experiencing.

== Awards ==
During her years of service, she has been the recipient of numerous awards, including the RI Human Rights Foundation "Braveheart Award," the American Heart Association "RI Heart on the Hill" Award, the RI National Guard Award of Excellence for Meritorious Service in Times of War, the Award of Excellence RI Foster Parent Association, the Mount Pleasant Crime Watch Award, the RI Hospitality Association Ambassador of Hospitality Award, the Concerned Citizens of Mount Pleasant Neighborhood Award, and the Appreciation Award for the Homententum Athletic Games.
