= Donna M. Hughes =

American academic (born 1954)

- Born: 1954 (age 71–72)
- Education: Pennsylvania State University (Ph.D., Genetics, 1990)
- Known for: Research and writing on human trafficking, sexual exploitation, and sexual slavery
- Scientific career
- Fields: Women's studies
- Workplaces: University of Rhode Island, Eleanor M. and Oscar M. Carlson Endowed Chair, Women's Studies Program; University of Bradford; Pennsylvania State University
External videos
- Dana Shugar Colloquium Lectures in Gender & Women's Studies: Presented at the Human Trafficking Conference, University of Nebraska–Lincoln
- Analysis of Human Trafficking Cases in Rhode Island 2009-2013 via YouTube

Donna M. Hughes (born 1954) is an American academic and feminist who serves as Eleanor M. and Oscar M. Carlson Endowed Chair of the gender and women's studies department at the University of Rhode Island. Her research concerns prostitution and human trafficking; she was a prominent supporter of the campaign to end prostitution in Rhode Island, and has testified on these issues before several national legislative bodies. She sits on the editorial board of Sexualization, Media, and Society, a journal examining the impact of sexualized media.

Her writing on transgender issues has been criticized as transphobic; the University of Rhode Island released a statement distancing itself from her views, while recognizing her academic freedom.

== Biography ==
Hughes was raised on a farm in central Pennsylvania. She later attended Pennsylvania State University, earning degrees in animal science, before earning a PhD in genetics in 1990.

While a student, she started volunteering at a rape crisis center and battered women's shelter. During this time, she started to read feminist analyses of violence against women, particularly sexual violence and exploitation. Hughes writes that she began to feel emotional and cognitive dissonance between her scientific studies and the feminist activist work she was doing. Initially an instructor in both genetics and women's studies, an increasingly critical view of what she felt was the disconnected nature of science led her to focus on women's studies.

Hughes later served as a lecturer on women's studies at University of Bradford, UK, between 1994 and 1996, before moving on to a full professorship at the University of Rhode Island, where she holds the Eleanor M. and Oscar M. Carlson Endowed Chair in Women's Studies. She has also served as Education and Research Coordinator for the Coalition Against Trafficking in Women.

Hughes is a co-founder of Citizens Against Trafficking.

== Research, teaching, and scholarship ==
Hughes is a leading international researcher on human trafficking. She has completed research on the trafficking of women and girls for sexual exploitation in several countries, including the United States, Russia, Ukraine, and Korea. She does research and writing on women's rights. Her topic areas include: violence, slavery, sexual exploitation, Islamic fundamentalism, and women's organized resistance to violence and exploitation. She has also worked on issues related to women, science, and technology.

Additionally, she has published research and analysis on the role of the Internet in facilitating sexual exploitation and trafficking of women and girls, and on the mail-order bride industry. She has also written extensively on women's rights in the Islamic world. Hughes has also published several articles on the role of women in science and technology.

== Honors ==
- Invited to the White House to witness the signing of the William Wilberforce Trafficking Victims Protection Reauthorization Act
- Invited to the Rhode Island State House to witness Governor Carcieri sign the Act Relating to Criminal Offenses-Prostitution and Lewdness

== Activism and views ==
She is one of the leading advocates of the abolitionist view with regards to prostitution. She is seen by many as a key figure linking the feminist and social conservative movements against "sex work", which these movements refer to as "sex trafficking". Hughes has received criticism from sex workers' rights activists for her view that laws against sexual exploitation are necessary to combat human trafficking and sexual slavery, and what many see as personal attacks against other academics and activists who support decriminalization of prostitution.

Hughes suggested that government-funded HIV prevention programs should check that sex workers were not victims of abuse, rather than simply hand out condoms. In 2002, she went before the House Committee on International Relations to report several harm-reduction programs that had received US funding, carried out by NGOs such as Médecins Sans Frontières, EMPOWER Thailand, International Human Rights Law Group, and the Dutch anti-trafficking organization La Strada. On April 9, 2003, she spoke before the Senate subcommittee on East Asian and Pacific Affairs: "There are billions of dollars being spent on HIV/AIDS prevention and treatment, and a significant portion is directed for prevention in high-risk groups such as women and children in prostitution. There should be appropriate restrictions or requirements on how aid organizations and/or personnel respond when they suspect that anyone they come in contact with is abused, exploited, or enslaved." Due to her conflation of all forms of prostitution with sex slavery, the changes she helped to bring about applied even to harm reduction programs that worked with under-served women in prostitution.

Hughes, in her efforts against sex trafficking and prostitution, has received support from Princeton scholar Robert P. George.

=== Transgender issues ===
In March 2021, Hughes published an essay titled, "Fantasy Worlds on the Political Right and Left: QAnon and Trans-Sex Beliefs", on the self-described radical feminist website 4W. The essay compared the beliefs of transgender activists to the right-wing conspiracy theory QAnon, and characterized various hormonal and surgical treatments and pro-trans language reforms as dystopian. Such statements prompted backlash from students and faculty at URI, who considered the essay transphobic and emblematic of larger problematic culture at the university. This response prompted the University of Rhode Island to release a statement distancing itself from the essay, while affirming Hughes' general academic freedom to express such views.

== Prostitution in Rhode Island controversy ==
From 2006 to 2009, Hughes was a leading figure in the campaign to end the decriminalized status of indoor prostitution in Rhode Island, so that police could conduct anti-sex trafficking investigations. She is a founding member of the Rhode Island group, Citizens Against Trafficking (CAT) in 2009. The initial legislative battles over indoor prostitution are documented in the 2009 documentary film Happy Endings?, in which Hughes appears, speaking at a community forum on human trafficking and testifying before the state legislature to change the prostitution law.

In September 2009, Hughes wrote several opinion pieces in the Providence Journal supporting a version of the legislation with stronger penalties for prostitution and taking the Rhode Island State Senate to task for what she viewed as its de facto support for continuing decriminalization of prostitution. This version of the bill was signed into law in November 2009. Several Rhode Island State Senators wrote editorials disputing Hughes claim that they had kept indoor prostitution legal, with Senator Charles Levesque taking Hughes to task for, in his view, providing a highly distorted reading of the legislation passed by the RI Senate.

Soon after the Rhode Island prostitution law hearings, Hughes was involved in a controversy surrounding the opening of the Center for Sexual Pleasure and Health (CSPH), a sexual education center in Pawtucket, Rhode Island organized by Megan Andelloux, a sex educator who had testified before the Rhode Island Senate in opposition to criminalizing indoor prostitution. Supporters of Andelloux claim that in September 2009, the opening of the CSPH was blocked after an email was sent by Hughes to Pawtucket city council members (stating, "Hello, A center for 'sexual rights' and 'sexual pleasure' is opening in Pawtucket"), also citing remarks made about Andelloux in an earlier Providence Journal editorial by Hughes, as well as in a bulletin on the Citizens Against Trafficking website. A 6-month zoning battle followed with the city of Pawtucket; the CSPH was eventually allowed to open in early 2010.

A March 2010 editorial in the Providence Journal claimed that Hughes has faced threatening remarks on various internet forums from patrons of massage parlors in retaliation for the role Citizens Against Trafficking played in the banning of indoor prostitution in Rhode Island.

== Selected publications ==
=== Books ===
- Hughes, Donna M.; Roche, Claire M.., eds. (1999). Making the harm visible: global sexual exploitation of women and girls: speaking out and providing services. Kingston, Rhode Island: Coalition Against Trafficking in Women. ISBN 9780967085708.
- Hughes, Donna M.; Raymond, Janice G.; Gomez, Carol (March 2001). Sex trafficking of women in the United States: international and domestic trends. Kingston, Rhode Island: Coalition Against Trafficking in Women. Archived from the original on 2018-03-11. Pdf.
- Hughes, Donna M.; Stoner Jr., James Reist (2010). The social costs of pornography: a collection of papers. Princeton, New Jersey: Witherspoon Institute. ISBN 9780981491134.

=== Chapters in books ===
- Hughes, Donna (1999). "The internet and the global prostitution industry". In Klein, Renate; Hawthorne, Susan (eds.). Cyberfeminism: connectivity, critique and creativity. North Melbourne: Spinifex Press. pp. 157–184. ISBN 9781875559688. Preview.
- Hughes, Donna; Mladjenovic, Lepa (2000). "Feminist resistance to war and violence in Serbia". In Waller, Marguerite; Rycenta, Jennifer (eds.). Frontline feminisms: women, war, and resistance. New York: Garland Publishing. pp. 241–270. ISBN 9780415932394. Preview.
- Hughes, Donna (2003). "Changing a masculinist culture: women in science, engineering, and technology". In Morgan, Robin (ed.). Sisterhood is forever: the women's anthology for a new millennium. New York, New York: Washington Square Press. pp. 393–400. ISBN 9780743466271. Details.
- Hughes, Donna (2004). "The use of new communication technologies for sexual exploitation of women and children". In Whisnant, Rebecca; Stark, Christine (eds.). Not for sale feminists: resisting prostitution and pornography. North Melbourne, Victoria: Spinifex Press. pp. 38–55. ISBN 9781876756499. Preview. Text.
- Hughes, Donna (2004). "Prostitution online". In Farley, Melissa (ed.). Prostitution, trafficking and traumatic stress. Binghamton, New York: Haworth Maltreatment & Trauma Press. pp. 115–132. ISBN 9781136764905. Pdf.

=== Journal articles ===
- Hughes, Donna (January 2004). "Prostitution online". Journal of Trauma Practice. 2 (3–4): 115–131. doi:10.1300/J189v02n03_06. S2CID 216134807.
