= Tara Hurley =

American film director (born 1976)

- Hurley in 2009.
- Born: August 6, 1976 (age 49); Providence, Rhode Island, U.S.
- Occupation: Film director

Tara Hurley (born August 6, 1976) is an American director of the 2009 documentary Happy Endings?.

Hurley was born in Providence, Rhode Island and grew up in the Riverside section of East Providence. She graduated from Providence College in 1998, where she received a bachelor's degree in Humanities. She studied abroad in Salamanca, Spain her junior year.

== Happy Endings? ==
Hurley's 2009 documentary following the debate over prostitution in Rhode Island where prostitution has been decriminalized for almost three decades. Hurley turned her cameras on the women in the Asian massage parlors at the center of the debate to criminalize prostitution where there had been rumors of human trafficking.

Before making Happy Endings?, Hurley says she had no preconceived notions on prostitution, and wanted to make the film to find out how she felt as a woman and a feminist about prostitution. In one interview Hurley states "I couldn't force an opinion on anyone because I didn't really have one. After making the film, doing all the research, and meeting all the people, I personally believe that all prostitution laws harm the women that they claim to protect. When a woman is arrested and gets a criminal record, she no longer has a chance to get out of sex work even if she wanted to. When filling out a job application it will be difficult to explain the criminal record, especially with all the stigma that comes with prostitution. To add insult to injury, I am offended that only the woman is arrested."

While debating the change in Rhode Island's prostitution law, Hurley stated that she was in support of full legalization of prostitution, though she later wrote in support of the Swedish model of prostitution law for Rhode Island as an alternative to the criminalization of sex workers. She also made an appearance on The Dan Yorke Show in which she discussed the film.

Hurley joined the fight to pass stronger human trafficking laws. In addition to working for tougher trafficking laws, Hurley also brought women from the spas to testify against the proposed prostitution law.
