= COYOTE =

American sex workers' rights organization

COYOTE is an American sex workers' rights organization. Its name is a backronym for Call Off Your Old Tired Ethics, a reflection of the fact that sex work tends to be stigmatized primarily because of society-imposed standards of ethics. COYOTE's goals include the decriminalization (as opposed to the legalization) of prostitution, pimping and pandering, as well as the elimination of social stigma concerning sex work as an occupation. Its work is considered part of the larger sex worker movement for legal and human rights.

COYOTE provides counseling and legal referrals for sex workers, and assistance in leaving sex work for different careers.

== Services ==
COYOTE provides expert advice and sensitivity training for social service and law enforcement agencies that deal with sex workers. COYOTE members have testified as expert witnesses during trials. The organization works to educate the general public about sex work, and promotes education about safe sex, AIDS and sexually transmitted disease among sex workers, their clients and the general public.

== History ==
COYOTE was founded in San Francisco in 1973 by Margo St. James, a feminist and former sex worker, along with Jennifer James, a Seattle-based professor of anthropology. Margo St. James had previously been arrested and convicted of a prostitution offense at age 25, but overturned the conviction after studying law for a year at Lincoln University San Francisco. She chose the name COYOTE because novelist Tom Robbins called her a "coyote trickster" and came up with "Call Off Your Old Tired Ethics" to fit the chosen backronym. St. James believed that sex work should be considered labor equivalent to any other career, writing in 1977 that "to make a great distinction between being paid for an hour's sexual services, or an hour's typing, or an hour's acting on a stage is to make a distinction that is not there."

=== Purpose ===
The group's purpose was "to provide a loose union of women—both prostitutes and feminists—to fight for legal change." COYOTE provided safe spaces for sex workers to meet to talk about their experiences and find support. They had "rap sessions" which used feminist consciousness raising methods, and let the women know that they were not alone in their experiences. They gathered stories and facts about the injustices sex workers faced and launched a public education drive to highlight the racist and sexist biases of prostitution arrests. Meetings and events were advertised through underground newspapers. COYOTE organized educational programs and cultural events to raise money for other projects and held public demonstrations to protest entrapment. They also organized "whore conventions" in San Francisco (1974), Washington, DC (1976), and in Brussels and Amsterdam (1985 and 1986).

=== Programs and services ===
COYOTE offered a variety of services to sex workers. They offered a hotline for prostitutes called SLIP (Survival Line for Independent Prostitutes), immediate legal assistance for prostitutes who had been arrested, suitable clothing for court appearances, and classes on survival skills for prostitutes in jail. COYOTE won policy changes in the 1970s that gradually diminished prostitution laws. They abolished mandatory penicillin therapy and multi-day jail quarantines and pressured public defenders to provide better representation for people accused of soliciting and prostitution, misdemeanor offenses. They instigated and sponsored at least 26 lawsuits on behalf of prostitutes and lifted a mandatory three-day venereal disease quarantine imposed by the San Francisco Police Department on prostitutes. They won by claiming that the incidence of VD disease is at least as high among people 20 to 40 years old as among whores and "only women are arrested and forced to have regular checks for VD." COYOTE got a judge to dismiss prostitution charges against 37 women whose male customers were not arrested and they organized protests against police harassment, which they believed was one of the most critical issues affecting prostitutes.

COYOTE threw annual Hookers' Balls from 1973 to 1979 in San Francisco, which served to destigmatize sex work, celebrate sex workers, and raise funds. From these events, COYOTE raised a bail fund to free women from exploitative pimps and created special welfare programs and assistance services.

As public concern about the AIDS epidemic grew, sex workers were increasingly blamed for spreading the disease. COYOTE immediately sought to address this, stating that the organization was "working to prevent the scapegoating of prostitutes for AIDS and other sexually transmitted diseases, and to educate prostitutes, their clients, and the general public about prevention of these disease". The organization spoke out against mandatory testing for sex workers for AIDS, deeming it a violation of civil rights. Various members of COYOTE joined together in 1988 to form the California Prostitutes Education Project (CAL-PEP), aiming to provide education about sex work from sex workers themselves. CAL-PEP published Prostitutes Prevent AIDS: A Manual for Health Education in 1988 with federal and state funding.

=== Affiliations ===
Shortly after the founding of COYOTE, Association of Seattle Prostitutes (ASP) and Prostitutes of New York (PONY) were founded. There were roughly 20 other "sister organizations" founded by 1979. These affiliates include organizations in "in Atlanta (HIRE – Hooking is Real Employment), New York (PONY – Prostitutes of New York), Maryland (HUM – Hookers’ Union of Maryland), Massachusetts (PUMA – Prostitute Union of Massachusetts Association), Hawaii (DOLPHIN – Dump Obsolete Laws: Prove Hypocrisy isn’t Necessary), Detroit (CUPIDS), Michigan (PEP), Seattle (ASP – Associated Seattle Prostitutes, SPARROW – Seattle Prostitutes Against Rigid Rules Over Women), Kansas City (KITTY), Los Angeles (CAT – California Advocates for Trollops), San Diego (OCELOT) and New Orleans (PASSION – Professional Association Seeking Sexual Identification Observant of Nature)." As COYOTE gained credibility as a national movement, it gained affiliations with more liberal and mainstream feminist organizations such as the National Organization for Women (NOW), Wages for Housework, the American Civil Liberties Union (ACLU), and the American Bar Association. These affiliations were possible in part due to COYOTE's wide support base, which at one point consisted of 270,000 members.

=== COYOTE v. Roberts ===
In 1976, COYOTE, led by St. James, filed a lawsuit against Rhode Island. In the case, COYOTE v. Roberts, the argument was based on how much power the state should have to control the sexual activity of its citizens. The lawsuit also alleged discrimination on how the law was being applied. Data was submitted that demonstrated selective prosecution: the Providence police were arresting female sex workers far more often than the male customers. St. James testified in the case. Although the case eventually was dismissed when Rhode Island General Assembly changed the prostitution statute in 1980, COYOTE and St. James are given credit as one of the reasons prostitution in Rhode Island was decriminalized, although prostitution was outlawed again in 2009. "Samantha" and Gloria Lockett were co-directors of COYOTE in the early 1990s. They had been critical of the group for focusing on "higher class" prostitutes (such as call girls and escorts) and white sex workers, while ignoring the concerns of streetwalkers and ethnic minorities.

In 2009, Bella Robinson founded the Rhode Island chapter of the organization (COYOTE RI) and currently serves as the executive director.

As of 2012, Norma Jean Almodovar serves as the executive director of the Los Angeles branch of COYOTE.

== See also ==
- A Vindication of the Rights of Whores
- International Day to End Violence Against Sex Workers
- International Sex Worker Foundation for Art, Culture and Education
- Prostitution in Rhode Island
- Prostitution in the United States
- Sex-positive feminism
- Sex worker
- Sex worker rights
- World Charter for Prostitutes Rights
