= Princeton Principles =

2006 policy paper

The Princeton Principles is a policy paper made up of Ten Principles on Marriage and the Public Good. It was released in May 2006 as the culmination of discussions among scholars that began at a 2004 meeting in Princeton, New Jersey in the United States. The finished policy paper and the initial meeting were sponsored by the Witherspoon Institute. McCormick Professor of Jurisprudence Robert P. George of Princeton University gave a copy of the Princeton Principles to George W. Bush at a meeting. The chair of the drafting committee, Political Science Professor James R. Stoner, Jr. of Louisiana State University remarked, "The better arguments are on our side but they haven't been made, or at least made with rigor or given a hearing in the media." Senator Sam Brownback made reference to the Princeton Principles on the floor of the Senate in his remarks on the Federal Marriage Amendment of 2006, which failed to pass.

== The Ten Principles ==
The 10 principles that summarize the public value of marriage and why society should endorse and support the institution:

- Marriage is a personal union, intended for the whole of life, of husband and wife.
- Marriage is a profound human good, elevating and perfecting our social and sexual nature.
- Ordinarily, both men and women who marry are better off as a result.
- Marriage protects and promotes the wellbeing of children.
- Marriage sustains civil society and promotes the common good.
- Marriage is a wealth-creating institution, increasing human and social capital.
- When marriage weakens, the equality gap widens, as children suffer from the disadvantages of growing up in homes without committed mothers and fathers.
- A functioning marriage culture serves to protect political liberty and foster limited government.
- The laws that govern marriage matter significantly.
- "Civil marriage" and "religious marriage" cannot be rigidly or completely divorced from one another.

== Official link ==
- Marriage & the Public Good: Ten Principles (original Witherspoon Institute document)
