= Norma Jean Almodovar =

American sex worker activist (born 1951)

- Born: Norma Jean Wright; May 27, 1951 (age 74); Binghamton, New York, U.S.
- Occupations: nonprofit executive director; author; sex worker activist
- Known for: former traffic officer turned prostitute; former candidate for lieutenant governor of the State of California
- Notable work: Cop to Call Girl
- Political party: Libertarian
- Criminal charge: pandering
- Criminal penalty: three years imprisonment; three years probation; three years parole
- Criminal status: released
- Spouses: Radames Almodovar (m. 1970–1978) Victor Savant (m. 1984)
- Website: normajeanalmodovar.com

Norma Jean Almodovar (born May 27, 1951) is an American author and sex workers' activist. Almodovar worked as a traffic officer for ten years. In 1982, she quit her job with the Los Angeles Police Department and began working as a call girl. In 1984, she may have attempted to recruit a former coworker to begin working as a prostitute. Her actions resulted in her arrest and conviction for pandering.

In 1986, Almodovar ran for lieutenant governor in the California gubernatorial election, as a Libertarian. Almodovar's autobiography was published by Simon & Schuster in 1993. She is the founder of the International Sex Worker Foundation for Art, Culture and Education (ISWFACE). As of 2012, Almodovar also serves as the executive director of the Los Angeles branch of the sex workers' rights organization COYOTE.

== Personal background ==
Norma Jean Almodovar (née Wright) was born on May 27, 1951, in Binghamton, New York. She is the daughter of Harold M. and Helen Ruth (née) Doolittle Wright. Her father served in World War II with the US Army and, upon his return, began working in a local factory. Her mother taught school, but retired early as her family continued to grow. Almodovar is the oldest daughter, with eight brothers and five sisters.

During Almodovar's childhood, her mother began attending the Baptist church, following her conversion to Christianity. From that point, Almodovar's social and spiritual life centered around the church. Fully embracing Christianity along with her mother, Almodovar felt drawn to spend her life in direct service to God. She began preparing to serve as a missionary to Puerto Rico, believing that God had a higher purpose for her life.

In 1969, following her graduation from Binghamton Central High School, Almodovar enrolled in the Philadelphia College of the Bible. After enrolling, she began looking for work to cover tuition and living expenses, but eventually relocated to New York City with a classmate. Soon after arriving in Manhattan, Almodovar began clerking at the Empire State Building.

=== Crisis of faith ===
In January 1970, Almodovar went to California to visit relatives. After spending a week with her aunt, she spent time with some friends from New York, who had recently relocated to Los Angeles. After their arrival, her friends became involved with a religious sect that presented extreme unorthodox teachings and displayed cultic tendencies. After Almodovar arrived in California, her friends began proselytizing, working to convert her to their fundamentalist beliefs.

Prior to her visit to California, Almodovar had experienced a crisis of faith and began reconsidering her long-held spiritual beliefs, encompassing the teachings of the Baptist church and her personal conviction about the existence of God. When her group of friends expressed their beliefs, she willingly accepted their invitation and joined their church. After she became a member, she began volunteering and serving the church and leadership in various capacities.

In summer 1970, she met a relative of one of the members in the church, who had recently completed his tour of duty with the US Air Force. After a short courtship, she married Radames Almodovar on November 19, 1970. The marriage lasted for three years, during which time, Almodovar continued to evaluate her religious beliefs and eventually chose to distance herself from the Christian beliefs of her childhood and those of her recent conversion to the church that had been embraced by her friends. At the time of her divorce to Almodovar, she no longer embraced Christianity.

== Professional background ==
=== Los Angeles Police Department ===
In 1972, Almodovar joined the Los Angeles Police Department (LAPD) as a civilian traffic officer. For the majority of her career, she was assigned to the Rampart and Hollywood Divisions, working the night shift. Her responsibilities included issuing parking tickets, recovering stolen property, and directing traffic and spectators at scene of automobile collisions, as well as the site of local fires or crime scenes. During her employment, Almodovar witnessed felony corruption and criminal activity carried out by other members of the police force. She additionally experienced three injuries while on the job.

On the job injuries

In 1974, Almodovar was injured, when her three-wheeled, LAPD-issued Harley-Davidson motorcycle rear-ended the vehicle in front of her. The driver of the other car initially intended to run a red light, but upon noticing the police vehicle behind him, stopped suddenly and put his car in reverse, hitting Almodovar's motorcycle. As a result of her injuries from the collision, Almodovar was on disability for over 18 months.

Almodovar's second injury came as a result of an attack by a local, well-known businessman and member of the Hollywood Chamber of Commerce. He reportedly attempted to run over Almodovar with his vehicle. While he was initially arrested for aggravated assault, the City of Los Angeles chose not to prosecute him. Due to local statutes, as a city employee, Almodovar was not allowed to file a lawsuit to recover damages for the physical and emotional injuries she received.

On April 18, 1982, Almodovar was injured for the third time. The department vehicle that she was driving was rear-ended by a man who was heavily intoxicated. After the collision, the driver fled the scene of the accident, but was quickly apprehended after a brief pursuit by undercover police officers that were nearby. Following his apprehension, the initial investigation revealed that the driver was an unauthorized Mexican national, who had stolen the vehicle and had just committed an armed robbery. While the individual was released from police custody shortly after being processed into the Hollywood jail, Almodovar was at the hospital undergoing medical tests to determine the extent of her injuries. Radiology reports indicated that she had an injured back and neck.

Following the incident of April 18, 1982, Almodovar became disillusioned with the Los Angeles Police Department and her former colleagues. She felt personally offended by individuals on the police force who had knowingly engaged in illegal and corrupt activities. These activities in which officers allegedly participated, encompassed organized crime rings that were responsible for burglaries, drug trafficking, contract killing, and sexual exploitation of minors.

The response of the police department following Almodovar's last injury served as the straw that broke the camel's back in the anger and disillusionment that she felt about the LAPD. She became frustrated at the lack of support from her colleagues, who consistently refused or neglected to prosecute individuals responsible for the injuries she had incurred. She was no longer confident that the City of Los Angeles or her coworkers were able or interested in protecting her from harm. After finishing the required paperwork and accident report, Almodovar went home and never returned to work for the Los Angeles Police Department again.

=== Prostitution ===
When her disability benefits ended, Almodovar began working as a call girl in Beverly Hills. When asked by others why she chose to work in the sex industry, she often replies that she

wanted to make a social statement about the moral hypocrisy of our society, a society which seemed completely untroubled by the police corruption that permeated the LAPD, and yet demanded that law enforcement spend a significant portion of its scarce and valuable resources to set-up and arrest women whose sole crime was to accept money from men for acts of sex in which they could otherwise legally engage, even with thousands of men, provided the sex was free.

Almodovar was opposed to arresting women for prostitution, done in an effort to protect them from exploitation, while the arrest itself would establish a police record and label them as a prostitute, potentially limiting opportunities throughout the rest of their lives. In comparing her work as a call girl with her work for the LAPD, she has said, "I would rather be a whore (an outcast from society) than to work for the Los Angeles Police Department. It is much more honest and I can live with myself."

=== Cop to Call Girl ===
While Almodovar was working on the night shift for the LAPD, she often spent several hours waiting for a tow truck to arrive and pick up stolen and illegally parked cars. During this down time, she began working on a manuscript that documented her life and career. After leaving the police force, she continued working on the book, adding her experiences as a prostitute. The book was titled, Cop to Call Girl.

== Legal proceedings ==
=== Arrest and probation ===
On September 17, 1983, Almodovar was arrested at her home for one count of pandering, then taken to the police station where she had previously worked. During the investigation, the police confiscated her unfinished manuscript, claiming that it was "evidence" of her crime. The case against her centered around the testimony of a former coworker, that Almodovar attempted to recruit as a prostitute. In her defense, Almodovar stated that she was merely helping to fulfill the sexual fantasy of the coworker and former friend, by setting her up with a wealthy businessman, who was willing to pay her for sex.

During the subsequent trial, presided by Judge Aurelio Muñoz, the coworker testified that she had arrived at Almodovar's house with a hidden tape recorder to document their conversation. Almodovar stated that her coworker had approached her as part of a setup by police officials, who wanted to stop her from completing her manuscript, which detailed her sexual escapades, along with department corruption. This was corroborated by the coworker on the witness stand, when she admitted that she had been working with other members of the LAPD to set up Almodovar, in an effort to keep her from publishing her book, which was believed to be an exposé of the inner workings and corruption of the Los Angeles Police Department.

Almodovar's defense attorney, Lawrence Teeter, offered little credible evidence to refute the prosecution's case. As a result, Almodovar was convicted of one count of felony pandering, which called for a mandatory three- to six-year prison sentence. Following her conviction, the judge ordered a 90-day psychiatric evaluation to determine whether or not Almodovar posed a threat to society. She was remanded to custody on November 21, 1984, the day before Thanksgiving.

Following the completion of Almodovar's psychiatric evaluation on January 9, 1985, Muñoz chose to disregard the mandatory sentencing guidelines, claiming them to be cruel and unusual punishment that was out of proportion for the actions for which Almodovar was convicted. Muñoz imposed a sentence of three years' probation.

In December 1985, the Los Angeles County District Attorney's office filed an appeal with the California State Court of Appeals, which overturned the sentence imposed by Muñoz and sent Almodovar to the California Institution for Women to serve the mandatory three years required by the sentencing guidelines.

== Published works ==
- Almodovar, Norma Jean (1993). Cop to call girl. New York: Simon & Schuster. ISBN 9780671794255.
- Almodovar, Norma Jean (2006), "Porn stars, radical feminists, cops and outlaw whores: the battle between feminist theory and reality, free speech and free spirits", in Spector, Jessica (ed.), Prostitution and pornography: philosophical debate about the sex industry, Stanford: Stanford University Press, pp. 149–174, ISBN 9780804749381.
