= James Reist Stoner Jr. =

- Born: January 4, 1955
- Education: Harvard University
- Scientific career
- Fields: Political scientist
- Workplaces: Louisiana State University
- Doctoral advisor: Harvey Mansfield
- Website: www.lsu.edu/jamesstoner

James R. Stoner Jr. (born January 4, 1955, in Washington, D.C.) is Hermann Moyse Jr. Professor and Director of the Eric Voegelin Institute in the Department of Political Science at Louisiana State University. Stoner specializes in political theory, English common law, and American constitutionalism.

== Education ==
Stoner graduated summa cum laude with an A.B. from Middlebury College in 1977, where he was a student of Murray Dry and Paul Nelson. He obtained both his M.A. (1980) and Ph.D. (1987) from Harvard University, studying under professor Harvey Mansfield.

== Career ==
Before arriving at LSU in 1988, Stoner was an instructor in Politics and Public Policy at Goucher College. He was a member of the National Council on Humanities until 2006, having been appointed to that post by George W. Bush in 2002. He is also a Senior Fellow of the Witherspoon Institute.

He contributed to the Princeton Principles, a policy paper released July 13, 2006, on the importance of "marriage and the public good." Additionally, Professor Stoner has authored two books: Common Law and Liberal Theory: Coke, Hobbes, and the Origins of American Constitutionalism, and Common Law Liberty: Rethinking American Constitutionalism. He has co-edited three books, Rethinking Business Management: Examining the Foundations of Business Education, The Social Costs of Pornography: A Collection of Papers, and The Thriving Society: On the Social Conditions of Human Flourishing, all three of which are collections of papers presented at conferences at Princeton University.

He has lectured, debated, or presented papers at a wide array of universities, including Harvard University, Princeton University, University of Virginia, Georgetown University, the United States Air Force Academy, Michigan State University, Boston College, Middlebury College, Bowdoin College, University of Richmond, Baylor University, Tulane University, Saginaw Valley State University, Salve Regina University, Loyola College of Maryland, Oglethorpe University, University of Alaska-Anchorage, Ave Maria University, St. Vincent College, Rochester Institute of Technology, Berry College, and the Catholic University of America, as well as at the law schools of Villanova University, University of Minnesota, Hamline University, University of St. Thomas, and University of Florida. Stoner served as acting Dean of the LSU Honors College for the Fall 2010 semester and chaired his department from 2007 to 2013.

== Published works ==
Books

- Stoner Jr., James Reist (1992). Common law and liberal theory: Coke, Hobbes, and the origins of American constitutionalism. Lawrence, Kansas: University Press of Kansas. ISBN 9780700606306.
- Stoner Jr., James Reist (2003). Common-law liberty: rethinking American constitutionalism. Lawrence, Kansas: University Press of Kansas. ISBN 9780700612482.
- Stoner Jr., James Reist; Gregg, Samuel (2008). Rethinking business management: examining the foundations of business education. Princeton, New Jersey: Witherspoon Institute. ISBN 9780981491103. Republished, with several chapters dropped or added, as Stoner Jr., James Reist; Gregg, Samuel (2009). Profit, prudence and virtue essays in ethics, business and management. Exeter, United Kingdom: Imprint Academic. ISBN 9781845401597.
- Stoner Jr., James Reist; Hughes, Donna M. (2010). The social costs of pornography: a collection of papers. Princeton, New Jersey: Witherspoon Institute. ISBN 9780981491134.
- Stoner Jr., James Reist; James, Harold (2015). The thriving society: on the social conditions of human flourishing. Princeton, New Jersey: Witherspoon Institute. ISBN 9780985108755.

Book chapters

- Stoner Jr., James Reist (2000), "The common law spirit of the American revolution", in Kristol, William; Blitz, Mark (eds.), Educating the prince: essays in honor of Harvey Mansfield, Lanham, Maryland: Rowman & Littlefield, pp. 192–204, ISBN 9780742508279
- Stoner Jr., James Reist (2003), "The new constitutionalism of publius", in Frost, Bryan-Paul; Sikkenga, Jeffrey (eds.), History of American political thought, Lanham, Maryland: Lexington Books, pp. 230–247, ISBN 9780739106242
- Stoner Jr., James Reist (2004), "Catholic politics and religious liberty in America: the Carrolls of Maryland", in Dreisbach, Daniel L.; Hall, Mark D.; Morrison, Jeffry H. (eds.), The founders on God and government, Lanham, Maryland: Rowman & Littlefield Publishers, pp. 251–271, ISBN 9780742522794
- Stoner Jr., James Reist (2008), "The electoral college and democracy", in Gregg II, Gary L. (ed.), Securing democracy: why we have an electoral college (2nd ed.), Wilmington, Delaware: ISI Books, pp. 43–54, ISBN 9781933859477

Articles

- Stoner Jr., James Reist (Fall 2002). "Is tradition activist? The common law of the family in the liberal constitutionalist world". University of Colorado Law Review. 73 (4). University of Colorado via HeinOnline.
- Stoner Jr., James Reist (Fall 2004). "Was Leo Strauss wrong about John Locke? (with comments by Michael Zuckert and a response)". The Review of Politics. 66 (4): 553–563. doi:10.1017/S0034670500039863. S2CID 154598430.
- Stoner Jr., James Reist (Fall–Winter 2005). "Is there a political philosophy in the declaration of independence?". Intercollegiate Review. 40 (2). First Principles ISI Web Journal: 3–11.
- Stoner Jr., James Reist (Summer 2006). "Constitutional resistance". Claremont Review of Books. VI (3). The Claremont Institute: 42–47.

=== Book reviews ===
- Stoner Jr., James Reist (Fall 2011). "Redeeming higher education – a review of "The faculty lounges: and other reasons why you won't get the college education you pay for" by Naomi Schaefer Riley". Claremont Review of Books. XI (4). The Claremont Institute: 64–67.
- Stoner Jr., James Reist (Fall 2015). "Magna Carta and Us – a review of "Magna Carta" by David Carpenter, et al". Claremont Review of Books. XV (4). The Claremont Institute: 52–55.
