= Paul Avery =

American journalist (1934–2000)

- Born: Paul Stuart Depew II; April 2, 1934; Honolulu, Hawaii Territory, U.S.
- Died: December 10, 2000 (aged 66); West Sound, Washington, U.S.
- Occupations: Journalist, author
- Spouse: Margo St. James
- Children: 3

Paul Avery (born Paul Stuart Depew II; April 2, 1934 – December 10, 2000) was an American journalist, best known for his reporting on the serial killer known as the Zodiac, and later for his work on the Patty Hearst kidnapping and trial. He worked for decades at the San Francisco Chronicle and the Sacramento Bee.

== Early life ==
Avery was born Paul Stuart Depew in Honolulu, Hawaii Territory, the son of Frances Quette Cannon (1911–1971) and Paul Stuart Depew Sr. (1905–1960). His parents divorced and his mother married Howard Malcom Avery, a decorated U.S. Navy officer and pilot. He would later take his adopted father's surname. Avery was raised and educated in Honolulu, Oakland, California, and Washington, D.C. At 21, Avery started his career in journalism in 1955 at the Vicksburg Post-Herald (Vicksburg, Mississippi).

He later worked at the Victoria Advocate (Victoria, Texas), the Anchorage Daily Times (Anchorage, Alaska), the Honolulu Advertiser (Honolulu, Hawaii), where he was appointed the paper's Big Island bureau chief at 23; and the San Luis Obispo Telegram-Tribune (San Luis Obispo, California).

== San Francisco Chronicle career ==
In 1959 Avery joined the San Francisco Chronicle. In the second half of the 1960s, Avery took a leave of absence from the Chronicle and moved with his family to Vietnam, where the United States was increasing its involvement in armed conflict. In Saigon, Avery co-founded Empire News, a freelance photojournalism organization. He expanded Empire News, opening a branch in Hong Kong, before returning to San Francisco in 1969, after three years in Asia.

In the mid-1980s, after working for The Sacramento Bee and writing a book about the Patty Hearst kidnapping, he signed up with the then- Hearst-owned San Francisco Examiner. He worked there until his retirement in August 1994.

=== Zodiac Killer ===
Avery received notice for his reporting on the Zodiac Killer case, a series of killings that began in December 1968 and ostensibly ended with the death of a San Francisco cab driver in October 1969. At the time, Avery was a police reporter for the San Francisco Chronicle.

For a long time, investigators thought that the Zodiac's activities were limited to the Bay Area, but Avery discovered a 1966 murder in Riverside that he linked to the Zodiac.

The Zodiac soon sent Avery (misspelled by the Zodiac as "Averly") a Halloween card, warning, "You are doomed." The front of the card read, "From your secret pal: I feel it in my bones/you ache to know my name/and so I'll clue you in..." Then inside: "But, then, why spoil the game?" Just as quickly as the threat was made public, a fellow journalist made up hundreds of campaign-style buttons, worn by nearly everyone on Chronicle staff, including Avery, that said, "I Am Not Paul Avery." At this time Avery began carrying a .38 caliber revolver.

=== Patty Hearst ===
When Patricia Hearst was kidnapped in February 1974, Avery joined forces with Chronicle reporter Tim Findley to produce a series of stories detailing the kidnapping and reporting about the members of the little-known band of revolutionaries who called themselves the Symbionese Liberation Army (SLA).

Avery covered the Hearst case until the young heiress was arrested in September 1975. Avery holed up on his houseboat at Gate 5 in Sausalito with Boston writer Vin McLellan to write The Voices of Guns, a book on the SLA and the Hearst kidnapping.

=== Later work ===
Avery was diagnosed with emphysema, a progressive disease, but he continued working in crime and journalism until the end of his life. After joining The Sacramento Bee in 1976, he discovered that authorities had wrongly charged an innocent man with murder. He was instrumental in convincing detectives to drop the charges.

== Personal life ==
While covering the war in Vietnam, Avery suffered a spinal fracture when a falling tree limb knocked him from atop an armored personnel carrier.

Avery died of pulmonary emphysema in West Sound, Washington, on December 10, 2000. Avery's family scattered his ashes in the San Francisco Bay the following June.

At the time of his death, Avery was married to Margo St. James, a feminist organizer and founder of the sex worker's rights group COYOTE (Call Off Your Old Tired Ethics). He has two daughters from an earlier marriage.

== In media ==
Avery was portrayed by Robert Downey Jr. in the 2007 film Zodiac. The film details the reporter's involvement in the Zodiac case, including his discovery of the connection of the 1966 Riverside murder to those in the Bay area, the threat on his life, and a fictionalized account of involvement with Robert Graysmith, a cartoonist who became an expert on the killer. It also explores Avery's eventual physical decline, including abuse of cocaine and alcohol. The film ends with a brief mention of his fatal illness and death. In 2010, his former colleague Lance Williams wrote that the movie "portrayed Avery as ruined by the Zodiac... That just wasn't true."
