= Megan Andelloux =

Sexologist and sexuality educator

- At the Center for Sexual Pleasure and Health in Rhode Island.
- Occupations: Sexologist and Sex Educator

Megan Andelloux is a certified sexologist and sexuality educator, accredited through The American Association of Sexuality Educators, Counselors and Therapists (AASECT) and The American College of Sexologists (ACS).

== Career ==
A former member of the Pentecostal church, Assembly of God, she has been a sexuality educator since 1998, originally working with Planned Parenthood, later as director of the Sexuality Learning and Resource Center and now serves as the director of the non-profit Center for Sexual Pleasure and Health (CSPH) in Pawtucket, Rhode Island. Andelloux is known for advocating that sexual pleasure is an integral part of overall sexual health, which she calls the "female pleasure principle".

=== Appearances ===
Andelloux has been an invited speaker at various colleges and universities, including Boston University Medical School, Brandeis University, Clark University, Bryant University, Wesleyan University, Brown University, Vanderbilt University, Harvard University, the Rhode Island School of Design, Tufts University, the University of Tennessee, and Yale University, as well as numerous other institutions such as the Center for Sex and Culture, and WholeDC.

=== Author ===
She is also the author of a chapter for the book We Got Issues!, a feminist response to cultural attitudes on feminism, as well as once writing for the sex worker magazine, $pread.

=== Advocacy ===
In late 2009 and early 2010, Andelloux's attempts to open The CSPH, her non-profit sexuality education center, became the center of a controversy pitting her against anti-prostitution and anti-trafficking activist Donna M. Hughes.

== The Center for Sexual Pleasure and Health ==
Although The CSPH was slated to open on September 26, 2009, Pawtucket Mayor James E. Doyle had "serious concerns about the Center for Sexual Pleasure and Health locating on Main Street" after he and the rest of the Pawtucket City Council received an e-mail one week prior to the scheduled opening. Although originally reported as being sent from an anonymous "concerned citizen", Lynn Comella later claimed that the e-mail had been sent by Professor Donna M. Hughes from University of Rhode Island.

The e-mail read, "Hello, A center for 'sexual rights' and 'sexual pleasure' is opening in Pawtucket". Rumors circulated that The CSPH would actually function as a brothel, an abortion clinic, and a havenhouse for sex trafficking. Andelloux said the CSPH would be a place where adults can talk openly about sex, and that opposition was founded on "a basic fear of talking openly about sexuality".

Under threat of arrest, Andelloux relocated the CSPH's premier event, which featured speeches such as the keynote by Carol Queen, from her leased space in The Grant Building to a nearby performance space. The Pawtucket City Council cited educational zoning restrictions as cause for their opposition. Despite the presence of other "educational" businesses that were already operating in the Grant Building, including a chess academy, Director of Administration Harvey E. Goulet denied Anelloux's application for a special permit, which drew criticism from the American Civil Liberties Union because Goulet was quoted as objecting to "this type of business" as "not really something we feel is appropriate for our city". Rhode Island ACLU executive director Steven Brown said that Goulet's comments made clear "the city's intent is to suppress the speech that would otherwise occur at the Center. Such content-based discrimination raises serious constitutional concerns."

In early 2010, the Zoning Board seemed to agree when, after many expressed regret to Ms. Andelloux for the prior tangle, the members cleared The CSPH to finally open. The Center for Sexual Pleasure and Health opened on February 2, 2010.

In December 2013, the CSPH attained status as a 501(c)(3) nonprofit organization making the organization tax-exempt and eligible to apply for government and foundation grants. Furthermore, any donations made to The CSPH are now tax-deductible.
