= Prostitution in Nepal =

Prostitution is illegal in Nepal. The Human Trafficking and Transportation (Control) Act, 2064, Act Number 5 of the Year 2064 (2008), criminalises prostitution and living of the earnings of prostitution by including it in the definition of human trafficking. UNAIDS estimate there to be 67,300 prostitutes in the country.

== Government policies ==
Although there are no laws in Nepal criminalizing sex work specifically, there are some laws that were enacted throughout the 1980s that criminalize trafficking within and outside of Nepal that are used towards sex work. Many of these laws are sometimes interpreted to accuse sex workers as well, which comes from a lack of knowledge in the distinction between the sex trafficking scene and sex work. Sex work is a term used to refer to all aspects of the lawful and unlawful sex industries around the world. There are various forms of sex work, including physical and verbal forms. This distinction is one that is not truly understood; thus, many of the policies and laws enacted within Nepal against trafficking—many argue—should not be applied to sex work. Authorities and laws trying to stop true slavery—trafficking—get misapplied to sex workers, clients and others involved in the sex industry.

In 1986, the Traffic in Humans (Control) Act was passed in Nepal and was totally aimed at stopping trafficking in the form of prostitution. However, this act, like many others, proved to be ineffective, mainly due to the fact that the act was “largely aimed at criminalizing prostitution rather than curbing trafficking activities.”

In 2008, the Human Trafficking and Transportation (Control) Act, criminalised prostitution and living of the earnings of prostitution by including it in the definition of human trafficking.

== Reasons for entering the sex industry ==
For many, entering into the sex industry is the only way in which they could survive economically in Nepal. However, sex work is not officially recognized among the industrial or service sectors of labor. There is a large case of sex trafficking in Nepal, but voluntary sex work is more common than many believe.

Among the developing poor nations throughout Southeast Asia today, Nepal remains one of the most poverty-stricken. Research shows that about 38% of the Nepali population is living under US$1 per day, and 82% under US$2 per day. Due to this high rate of poverty, the rural poor Nepalese people generally have large families, are landless or have very small landholdings, have high rates of illiteracy and are concentrated in specific ethnic, caste and minority groups. These issues of poverty are part of why many people, including both cisgender and transgender men and women, go into the sex industry in Nepal. Due to their large families, these sex workers need to find a way to help out within the household. More specifically, there are not many opportunities for the women sex workers, and women in general, to break out of the domestic environment and duties which have left them in poverty, so the only option left for them is going into sex work.

Nepal, like many other Southeast Asian countries, has a limited amount of resources for women. Recently, the Nepalese government has recognized more rights for women in terms of family involvement, physical integrity, ownership rights, and overall civil liberties. However, this does not change the fact that women are still highly underrepresented in Nepalese society, and do not have the same rights that men do.

Women constitute a majority of these sex workers, because they rarely have any opportunities otherwise. These women may feel empowered by the work that they do, in the sense that they can better provide for their families, and be seen for something other than what society treats women. In some cases, girls that are put into the sex industry are forced to migrate to carpet factories outside of Nepal or in more centralized cities by their families to better provide for them. After a while, they are either abducted into the traffic scene, or coerced to join. The issue of poverty has driven many families in Nepal to desperation, to the point of putting their daughters out on the streets to earn money to help out in the home.

Human trafficking in Nepal—more specifically, sex trafficking—is a common precursor to voluntary sex work. After escaping from the sex trafficking world, women return to sex work when they return to Nepal, for it is the only thing they know.

== Consequences of sex work ==
Sex work in Nepal can be a short-term relief to the poverty and struggles encountered by these hundreds of women on a daily basis. The long-term effects bring a new perspective to sex work, and are a big part of the argument against sex work.

=== Short-term consequences ===
Many people go into the sex work field in hopes of finding a better opportunity for their families and for themselves. This is especially true in Nepal, which is ranked as one of the countries with the lowest human development indicators in the world, ranked 143 in the United Nations Human Development Index, with an HDI of 0.458. Because sex workers usually belong to the lower castes of the caste system within Nepal (a survey conducted by UN Nepal, showed that the majority of the sex workers were from Tamangs and Dalits), India, and other Southeast Asian countries, they feel as though sex work is the only opportunity that they truly have to better their lives and that of their families. The Nepalese caste system makes it very difficult for people of any class to rise up to a higher class. There have been rare instances in which members of a specific class have risen, and even in these cases, the members only rise within their own caste (see also Nepalese caste system). Due to this social trap, sex work is seen as a way to escape from the social organization. Sex work can allow those in lower castes to provide for their family in a different way. In the short-term, going into the sex industry would seem like a logical solution, since the money that many of these sex workers make can go towards the improvement of their families.

=== Long-term consequences ===
Sex workers are exposed to a variety of serious risks, including: sexually transmitted diseases, a decrease in security, and a loss of human rights.

==== Sexually transmitted diseases ====
Nepal faces increasing HIV prevalence among most at-risk populations (MARPs) such as sex workers, injecting drug users (IDUs), men who have sex with men (MSM), and migrants. Since 1988, when the first case of HIV/AIDS in Nepal was reported, more than 1,750 cases of AIDS and over 11,000 cases of HIV infection were officially reported. Since Nepal is limited in terms of its public health surveillance system, the actual number of infections throughout the country is said to be more. UNAIDS estimates that approximately 30,000 people were living with HIV in 2018. HIV prevalence amongst sex workers was estimated to be 4.2%, compared to 0.1% for the general population

==== Compromised security ====
The entry of women into sex work can sometimes take an unexpected turn. Although some women go into the sex industry voluntarily, they can end up being taken into the larger sex trafficking scene to India and surrounding areas. The trafficking of women and girls to India is a major problem which has made international news. Every year, a rough estimate of about 7,000 Nepali girls are trafficked to India, where they are forced into prostitution. Nepalese women and girls, especially virgins, are favored in India, because of their fair skin and young looks (see also Human trafficking in Nepal).

Since the policy of an open border between China and Nepal, a large number of Nepalese women in recent years have been sold into prostitution or as brides to Chinese men.

Aside from being kidnapped into the trafficking scene, sex workers run the risk of being abused sexually against their will. When things like this happen, it is hard for these sex workers to get protection, because they are seen as criminals. This is one of the reasons that many are fighting to legalize voluntary sex work. Many argue that these people deserve protection against harm, just like those that are taken into the trafficking scene.

==== Loss of human rights ====
When living a life in the sex industry, many argue that the risk of losing human rights is common. Many times, especially in Nepal, the sex industry is run by organized crime. The sex industry contributes between 2–14% of gross domestic product in countries such as Nepal. Due to this, there is a great incentive for corruption as far as within officials and the police. “This puts women sex workers in vulnerable positions because the institution mandated to protect people either ignores their problems or takes part in the abuse.” If sex workers were to challenge the authority of these officials—even by demanding control over their own bodies—they are running the risk of being punished within the community and even the law. This is another controversial issue, in that the suppliers are always the ones being punished, while the demand sector of this industry seems to get away with their equally incriminating actions.

== Sex trafficking ==
Nepal is a source, transit, and destination country for women and children subjected to sex trafficking. Nepali women and girls are subjected to sex trafficking in Nepal, India, the Middle East, Asia, and Sub-Saharan Africa. Unregistered migrants, including the large number of Nepalis who travel through India or rely on unregistered recruiting agents, are particularly vulnerable to sex trafficking. Some migrants from Bangladesh, Sri Lanka, and possibly other countries transit Nepal en route to employment in the Middle East, using potentially falsified Nepali travel documents, and may be subjected to human trafficking. Some government officials reportedly accept bribes to include false information in Nepali identity documents or provide fraudulent documents to prospective labor migrants, a tactic used by unscrupulous recruiters to evade recruitment regulations. Many Nepalis, including children, whose home or livelihood was destroyed by the 2015 earthquakes continue to be vulnerable to trafficking. Traffickers increasingly utilize social media and mobile technologies to lure and deceive their victims.

The United States Department of State Office to Monitor and Combat Trafficking in Persons ranks Nepal as a 'Tier 2' country.

== See also ==
- HIV/AIDS in Nepal
- Sex Trafficking
- Sex workers
- Pir
