= Prostitution in Rhode Island =

Prostitution in Rhode Island was outlawed on November 3, 2009, when Republican Governor Donald Carcieri signed into law a bill which makes the buying and selling of sexual services a crime.

Prostitution was legal in Rhode Island between 1980 and 2009 because there was no specific statute to define the act and outlaw it, although associated activities were illegal, such as street solicitation, running a brothel, and pimping. With the passing of the law, Nevada became the only U.S. state which allows legal prostitution.

== Legal status ==
Exchanging sex for money is illegal, for both the prostitute and the customer, and is classified as a misdemeanor.

The law makes selling sexual services a misdemeanor crime punishable by a fine of $250 to $1,000, or up to six months in prison, or both, for first offenders. The legislation includes a provision that empowers judges to erase any record of charges of convicted prostitutes after one year. Multiple offenders face a fine of $500 to $1,000, or up to a year in prison, or both.

Customers face a fine of $250 to $1,000, or up to a year in prison, or both, for first offenders, and a fine of $500 to $1,000, or up to a year in prison, or both, for multiple offenders. The law offers no provision to allow a judge to expunge the record of the customers. The crime is also classified as a misdemeanor.

Landlords who knowingly profit from prostitution on their property also face fines of $2,000 to $5,000, and one to five years in prison for first offenses. Multiple offenders face fines of $5,000 to $10,000, and 3 to 10 years in prison.

== History ==
Prostitution was decriminalized in Rhode Island in 1980, when the prostitution laws were amended, reducing prostitution from a felony to a misdemeanor. The drafters of the law removed the section that addressed committing the act of prostitution itself, and only street solicitation remained illegal. Prostitution remained decriminalized in the state until November 2009, when it was outlawed again.

It has been argued that the lawmakers who amended the Rhode Island prostitution laws in 1980 had decriminalized indoor prostitution by mistake, unintentionally creating a "loophole". Rhode Island State Senator John F. McBurney III was the only member of the General Assembly at the time of the 2009 vote who had served in 1980. He stated in 2009, "We probably vote on 500 bills a year (...) They didn't know what they were voting for." John C. Revens Jr., a former Senate Majority leader and a lawyer who served in the General Assembly for nearly four decades opined, "They would never sponsor a bill decriminalizing prostitution if they knew what it was. No way. Not in a million years." However, even at the time of the 1980 legislation, both a court ruling and the Attorney General recognized this effect.

- 1976: COYOTE, a sex workers' rights activist group led by Margo St. James, file a lawsuit against Rhode Island. The argument was based on how much power the state should have to control the sexual activity of its citizens in the case COYOTE v. Roberts. The lawsuit also alleged discrimination on how the law was being applied. Data was submitted that demonstrated selective prosecution, as the Providence Police were arresting female prostitutes far more often than the male customers. Ralph J. Gonnella was Margo St. James's lawyer. He argued that the prostitution law was so broad that it failed to even mention money. It could make sexual relations between unmarried adults a crime punishable by a $10 fine, and the person who initiated the offer of sex could be charged with soliciting and face up to five years in prison.
- 1980: Rhode Island General Assembly changed the law on prostitution, deleting the statute which prohibited the act of prostitution itself, but continuing to prohibit street solicitation. With the change in the criminal statute, the lawsuit filed by COYOTE was dismissed as moot.
- 1998: State Supreme Court rules in State v. DeMagistris that the law against soliciting for prostitution was "primarily to bar prostitutes from hawking their wares in public," and it could not be applied to convict someone for activity that takes place in private.
- 2003: Prostitution charges against four women arrested at two Providence spas were dismissed after attorney Michael J. Kiselica cited the 1998 Supreme Court ruling, successfully arguing that Rhode Island had no law against indoor prostitution.
- 2005: Bill to make prostitution illegal, wherever it occurs, died in the General Assembly; similar bills failed in subsequent years.
- 2009: Prostitution was outlawed. On November 3, Governor Donald Carcieri signed into law a bill which made it a crime to exchange sex for money.

An article by Scott Cunningham and Manisha Shah published in the Review of Economic Studies found that the judicial decriminalization of indoor prostitution in 2003 caused a 30% decline in reported rapes with female victims and a 40% reduction in female gonorrhea incidents during the six years that prostitution was not an illegal offense.

== 2009 legislative session ==
=== Legislative battle ===
At the beginning of 2009, two bills were introduced in the Rhode Island General Assembly which defined the crime of prostitution to include any location (one bill, H5044, originated in the House, and the other, S596, in the Senate).

The most prominent proponent of criminalization was Representative Joanne Giannini (D). She introduced Bill H5044 into the House on January 8, 2009 (co-sponsored by Reps. Coderre, Melo, Gemma, and Fellela), and it was referred to the Committee which considered it on April 4, and substituted the text (Sub A) on April 30. The House voted on this with amendments on May 13, and the bill passed to the Senate Committee on May 28 where it remained until the Assembly recessed for the summer.

In the Senate, a similar bill was introduced by Senator Jabour on February 25 (co-sponsored by Senators O'Neill, Lynch, Cote, and Picard). The Judiciary Committee conducted hearings on June 25. The Senate hearings attracted much media attention. Asian spa workers, recruited by Tara Hurley, testified against the bill. After the testimony of the sex workers, a number of other groups spoke out against the bill. The Committee recommended version Sub A by a vote of 8:4, which was voted on in the Senate the following day and referred to the House. Both bills were accompanied by other trafficking legislation, H5661 (Giannini) and S605 (Senator Rhoda Perry).

As both the House and the Senate recessed, two separate versions of prostitution bills remained. Both chambers had to approve a single identical bill in order for it to be sent to the Governor, for him to sign it into law. The two bills differed in the levying of punishment. The Senate version of the bill called for staggered penalties for first, second, and third offenses. Prostitutes, their customers, and property owners found guilty of a first offense would have been punished by a civil "violation" and a fine of $100. The House version of the bill called for no penalties for landlords but contained stiffer penalties for prostitutes and customers who were first-time offenders. Anyone found guilty of prostitution faced imprisonment for up to 6 months and a fine of up to $1,000. The penalty for subsequent offenses was up to a year imprisonment and a fine of up to $1,000.

Upon review of both versions of the prostitution bills, the State Police, Attorney General Patrick C. Lynch, and Governor Donald Carcieri called for the passage of the House version of the bill, with stiffer penalties for first-time offenders. Supt. Col. Brendan P. Doherty of the Rhode Island State Police testified that the police agency, "cannot support civil sanctions for such reprehensible acts."

==== Media scrutiny ====
Two front-page articles were published in the Providence Journal before the General Assembly returned for a special session, and Happy Endings? was released to the general public—a documentary on the Asian massage parlors in Rhode Island.

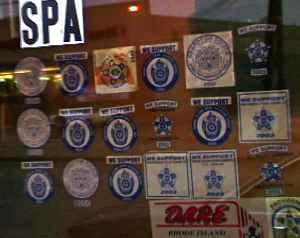
Front door of a Providence spa with multiple police stickers

- On September 18, 2009, the Providence Journal reported that the Fraternal Order of Police, representing the Rhode Island State Police, and the Providence, Barrington, Warwick, and Cranston police had solicited donations from the spas. Many city spas have stickers decorating doors and windows, along with logos noting that the spa accepts all major credit cards. Donations from these spas also paid for ads in The Rhode Island Trooper, the official publication of the non-profit Rhode Island State Police Association, a membership organization of state police "dedicated to the improvement of the law enforcement profession...."
- On October 25, the Journal reported that over 30 women representing spas in Rhode Island gathered at a Providence Community Center to voice their concern on the pending legislation. Sunyo Williams was working in a Pawtucket spa with three other women, and she said through an interpreter that nobody was under any force to work in that field, and that the women were willing to answer one by one and testify that it was their own choice. She said that each woman had a separate tax identification number and paid taxes, and that all her customers came from Massachusetts, and that the women were making money and spending it in Rhode Island. Some of the other women also spoke or asked questions of the lawmakers, or representatives of advocacy groups such as the Rhode Island Coalition Against Human Trafficking, who attended Sunday's 8:30 a.m. meeting.

=== Special legislative session ===
- RI House of Representatives: On October 28, the House passed a bill which defined the crime of prostitution.
- RI Senate: On October 29 the bill passed the Senate.

Governor Carcieri signs into law the bill which outlaws prostitution, as Rep. Joanne Giannini looks on

The bill was sent to Governor Donald Carcieri to be signed into law.

=== Signing the bill into law ===
On November 3, 2009, at a State House ceremony, Governor Donald Carcieri signed into law the bill which outlawed prostitution in Rhode Island.

In addition to the legislation's sponsors, the attendants at the ceremony included Rhode Island Atty. Gen. Patrick C. Lynch and State Police Col. Brendan P. Doherty.

State Police Col. Doherty said that the new law "sends a distinct message to any group (which) thinks they could use Rhode Island in furtherance of their illicit business".

== Aftermath ==
On February 26, 2010, Providence police charged four women from two city spas on prostitution charges. Three of the women were charged with prostitution, and one of the women was charged with permitting prostitution.

On June 30, 2010, the first woman was allowed to have her prostitution records expunged under the new law. Attorney General Patrick Lynch plans to appeal.

On November 20, 2010, the Rhode Island state police, Providence police and special agents from U.S. Immigration and Customs Enforcement shut down a brothel operating in a first floor apartment in Providence and arrested two women.

Research published in 2017 in the Review of Economic Studies found that after the decriminalisation of prostitution Rhode Island in 2003, gonorrhoea decreased by 40% in females, and that sexual violence fell by 30%.

== Parties in the debate ==
The main support for a full prostitution ban has come from the Governor, Attorney General, police, Donna M. Hughes of the University of Rhode Island, and Citizens Against Trafficking (CAT). CAT was formed by Donna M. Hughes and Melanie Shapiro after leaving Rhode Island Coalition Against Human Trafficking (RICAHT) when that group refused to support Representative Giannini's version of the bill. Also providing testimony for support of the law was Concerned Women for America, Laura Lederer, and Margaret Brooks, a professor of economics at Bridgewater State College.

In addition to RI Coalition Against Human Trafficking, opposition to the bill came from women's rights groups, anti-trafficking groups, sex workers, and sex educators. These groups included Amos House, Brown University Students Against Human Trafficking, Direct Action for Rights and Equality (DARE), Family Life Center, the International Institute of Rhode Island, American Civil Liberties Union, Rhode Island Coalition for the Homeless, Rhode Island National Association of Social Workers and the Rhode Island National Organization for Women. Other groups providing testimony included the Urban Justice Center. Individuals included the women's chaplain of the Adult Correctional Institutions and Ann Jordan, the Director of the Program on Human Trafficking and Forced Labor at Washington College of Law, who provided testimony arguing that the bill would not help fight trafficking, but instead worsen the problem. During the summer recess, two Representatives, David Segal and Edith Ajello outlined their reasons for opposing the bills. Similarly Senators Jabour and McCaffrey stated the arguments for the Senate bill. The Senate bill was seen as too weak by supporters of the House bill because it lacked prison time.

== See also ==
- Happy Endings?, a documentary about Asian brothels in Rhode Island during the battle in the state legislature to make prostitution illegal.
