= HIV/AIDS in Nepal =

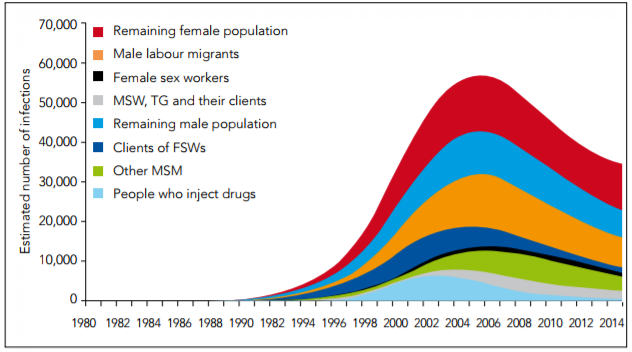
Chart showing the estimated number of HIV infections among key population groups aged 15-49 years from 1980 to 2014

The first HIV/AIDS cases in Nepal were reported in 1988. The HIV epidemic is largely attributed to sexual transmissions and account for more than 85% of the total new HIV infections. Coinciding with the outbreak of civil unrest, there was a drastic increase in the new cases in 1996. The infection rate of HIV/AIDS in Nepal among the adult population is estimated to be below the 1 percent threshold which is considered "generalized and severe". However, the prevalence rate masks a concentrated epidemic among at-risk populations such as female sex workers (FSWs), male sex workers (MSWs), injecting drug users (IDUs), men who have sex with men (MSM), Transgender Groups (TG), migrants and male labor migrants (MLMs) as well as their spouses. Socio-Cultural taboos and stigmas that pose an issue for open discussion concerning sex education and sex habits to practice has manifest crucial role in spread of HIV/AIDS in Nepal. With this, factors such as poverty, illiteracy, political instability combined with gender inequality make the tasks challenging.

As of December 2007, the Government of Nepal reported 1,610 cases of AIDS and 10,546 HIV infections, which has grown to 13,000 infections by World AIDS Day 2008. UNAIDS estimates from 2007 indicate that approximately 75,000 people in Nepal are HIV-positive, including all age groups. The Government of Nepal's National Center for AIDS & STD Control (NCASC) estimated that number to be closer to 70,000 in December 2007. In a study from 2014, an overall national HIV prevalence was 0.20% (adult male 0.28%, adult female 0.13%). According to UNAIDS, by the end of 2015, the number of people living with HIV was 39,000 [34,000–46,000] NCASC (2010) reports that estimated number of HIV infections by risk groups is 59,984 In terms of absolute numbers, Nepal's 1.5 million to 2 million labor migrants account for the majority of Nepal’s HIV-positive population. In one subgroup, 2.8 percent of migrants returning from Mumbai, India, were infected with HIV, according to the 2006 IBBS among migrants.

As of 2007, HIV prevalence among female sex workers and their clients was less than 2 percent and 1 percent, respectively, and 3.3 percent among urban-based MSM. The NCASC reports HIV infections to be more common among men than women, as well as in urban areas and the far western region of Nepal, where migrant labor is more obvious. According to Nepal's 2007 United Nations General Assembly Special Session (UNGASS) report, labor migrants make up 41 percent of the total known HIV infections in Nepal, followed by clients of sex workers (15.5 percent) and IDUs (10.2 percent). The annual new infection in 2014 is estimated at 1,493 and is expected to decline by 899 by 2020. An estimated number of 2,576 deaths were caused by AIDS in 2014, lower compared to estimated 3,362 deaths in 2013 which is, largely due to increased access to treatments. Poverty, low levels of education, illiteracy, gender inequalities, marginalization of at-risk groups, and stigma and discrimination compound the epidemic's effects. Unsafe sex and drug injection practices, civil conflict, internal and external mobility, and limited adequate health care delivery multiply the difficulties of addressing HIV/AIDS. Moreover, existing care and support services are already overwhelmed as increasing numbers of HIV-infected individuals become sick with AIDS. The UNICEF report, "Increasing Vulnerability of Children in Nepal", estimates the number of children orphaned by HIV/AIDS to be more than 13,000. The national estimate of children 0 to 14 years of age infected by HIV is 2,500 (2007). Nepal has a high tuberculosis (TB) burden, with 81 new cases per 100,000 people in 2005, according to the World Health Organization. HIV infects 3.1 percent of adult TB patients, and HIV-TB co-infections complicate treatment and care for both diseases.

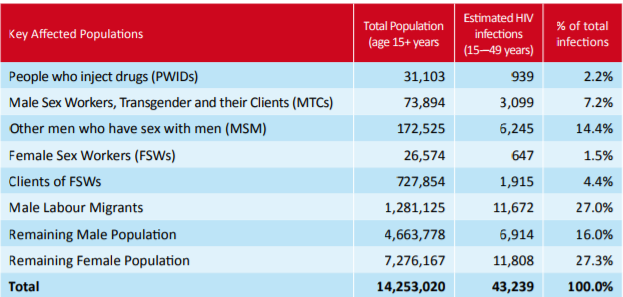

Due to cultural, social and economic constraints, it becomes difficult for FSWs to negotiate condom usage with their clients or obtaining health services and legal counseling. Their clients consist of transport workers, members of police force or military, and migrant workers who do not use condoms which constitutes 60% of their client base. Trafficking of Nepalese girls and women into commercial sex work in India has been a major issue to HIV. 50% of Nepalese sex workers in Mumbai brothels are HIV positive (FHI 2004). Given the nature of the epidemic in Nepal, most of the national initiatives have focused on leadership, partnerships and the involvement of civil society for prevention, care, and support for its most-at-risk populations. From 2003, the NCASC implemented the HIV/AIDS Operational Plan based on the National Strategy 2002–2006. Currently, the HIV/AIDS activities are shaped by the second National HIV/AIDS Strategy 2007–2011, and implementation is coordinated under the 2006–2008 National Action Plan, which has the following priorities:

- Preventing the spread of sexually transmitted infections (STIs) and HIV infection among at-risk groups;
- Ensuring universal access to quality treatment, diagnostics, care, and support services for infected, affected, and vulnerable groups;
- Ensuring a comprehensive and well-implemented legal framework on HIV/AIDS promoting human rights and establishing HIV/AIDS as a development agenda;
- Enhancing leadership and management at national and local levels for an effective response to HIV/AIDS;
- Using strategic information to guide planning and implementation for an improved effective response; and
- Achieving sustainable financing and effective utilization of funds.

== See also ==
LGBTQ rights in Nepal
