= Massage parlor =

Business offering the services of masseuses/masseurs

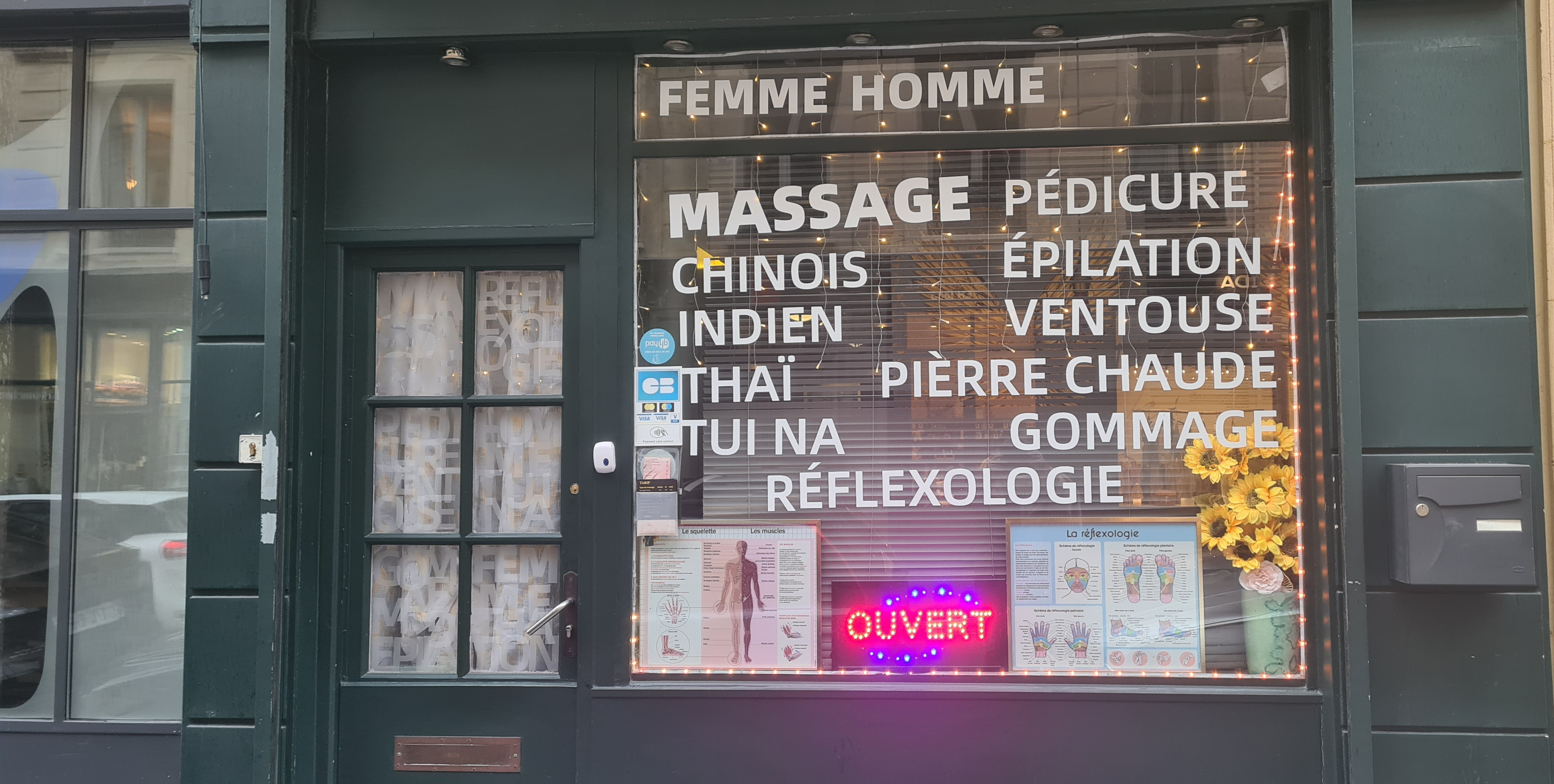
Massage parlors in Paris, France.

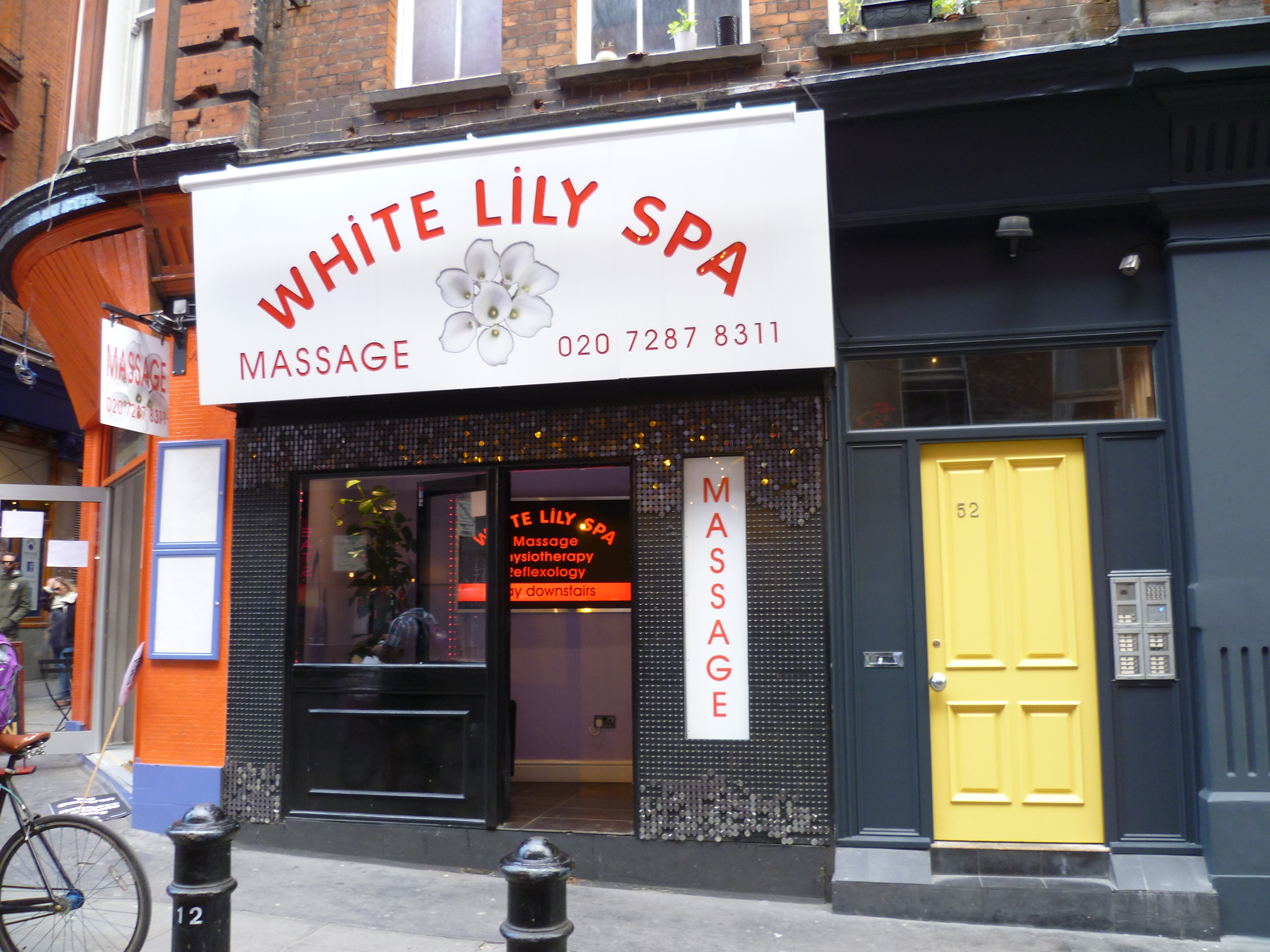
Massage parlour in London's Soho, England.

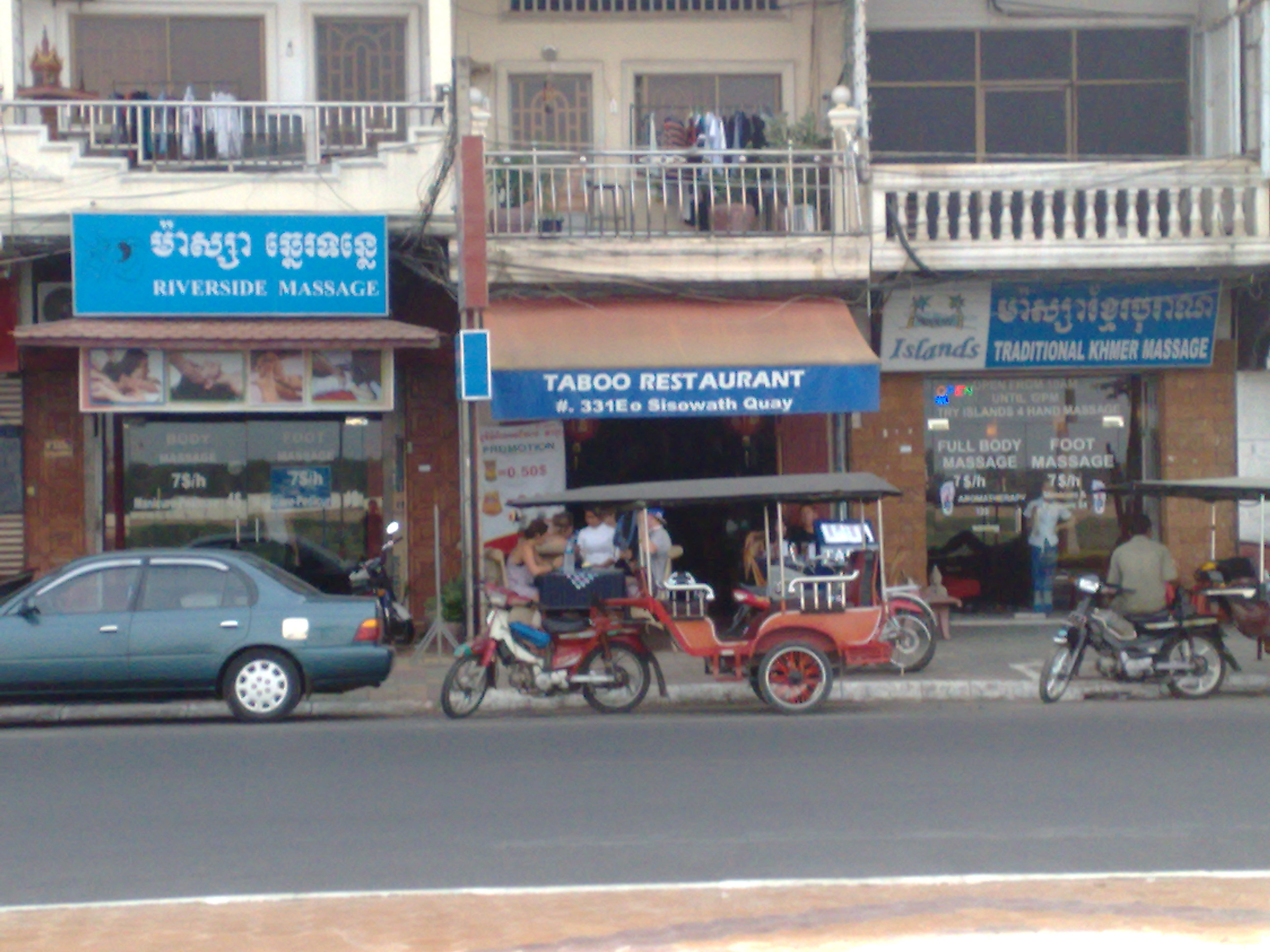
Massage parlors in Cambodia.

A massage parlor (American English), or massage parlour (Canadian/British English), or massage salon is a place where massage services are provided. Some massage parlors are front organizations for prostitution, and the term "massage parlor" has also become a euphemism for a brothel.

== Background ==
The term "massage parlour" (British English) or "massage parlor" (American English) sometimes refers to a front for prostitution, an association popularized by the "Massage Scandals" of 1894. In 1894, the British Medical Association (BMA) inquired into the education and practice of massage practitioners in London and found that prostitution was commonly associated with unskilled workers and debt, often working with forged qualifications. In response, legitimate massage workers formed the Society of Trained Masseuses (now known as the Chartered Society of Physiotherapy), with an emphasis on high academic standards and a medical model for massage training.

Particularly where prostitution is illegal, massage parlors (as well as saunas, spas or similar establishments) may be fronts for places of prostitution. Illegal brothels disguised as massage parlors are common in many countries.

Alternatively, the massages at certain massage parlors may have a "happy ending", meaning that the massage ends with the client receiving a sexual release. In addition to a "happy ending" service, given the restrictions imposed upon most striptease venues, some erotic massage venues now also offer a service where the client can masturbate while watching an artist perform a striptease.

There is a grey area and ambiguity as to when an ordinary massage becomes sexual when it comes to individuals with sexual interests such as tripsophilia, tripsolagnophilia, partialism, autofetishism or organofact, who may feel that the massage of the entire body or any ordinary bodyparts unrelated to typical erogenous zones are associated with eroticism and sensuality.

== China ==
Most types of massage, with the exception of some traditional Chinese medicine, are not regulated in China. Massage parlors often serve as fronts for brothels and in the 2010s the government took a number of measures to curb the practice. During a nationwide crackdown known as the yellow sweep ("yellow" in Mandarin Chinese can refer to anything erotic, lewd or sexually illicit) prostitutes were arrested and their places of work were shut down. In Guangdong, limitations were placed on the design and operation of massage parlors, and customers who visited them late at night were required to provide identification and their visits were recorded by the local police.

== Germany ==
Prostitution in Germany is legal. In 2004 the German city of Cologne introduced a tax on the city's sex industry including its massage parlors. It was the only city to do so.

== Italy ==
In Italy, massage parlours can be fronts for prostitution. Advertisements for massage parlours are listed in newspapers, in some cases offering "Japanese" or "Oriental" massage. Viva Lain, one of Italy's largest chains of massage parlours, was raided by the police in 2003.

== Malaysia ==
Since the end of the 20th century an expansion in prostitution in Malaysia has resulted in massage parlors being established across the country. Malaysian massage parlors often call themselves spas, salons, or health centres, and many offer erotic massages and "happy endings".

== Nepal ==
In Kathmandu's tourist district of Thamel, massage parlours typically advertise Thai massage, Ayurvedic massage or Nepalese "special massage". Some offer legitimate massage, while others are sex establishments. Prostitution in Nepal is illegal so the owners of such massage parlours do not explicitly solicit sex and the paying of police bribes is a customary part of the operation.

== Thailand ==
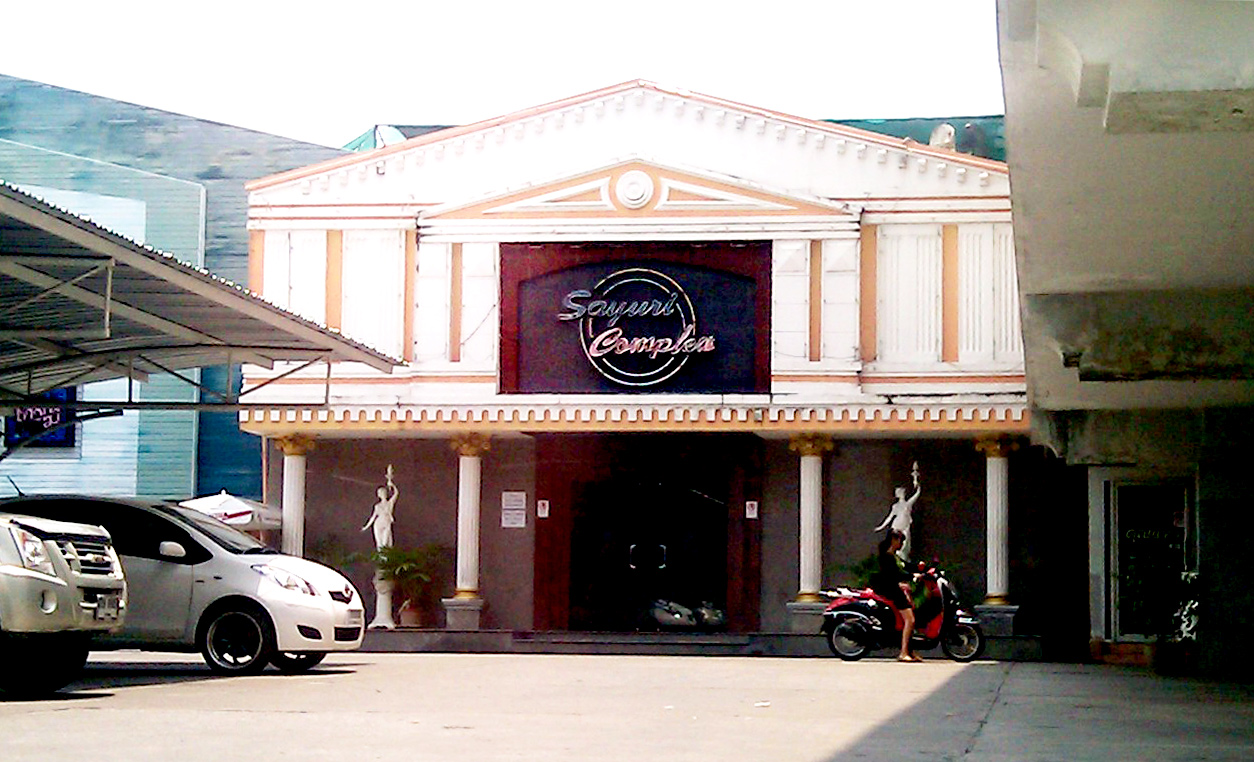
A massage parlor and soapland in Chiang Mai, Thailand

There are many businesses in Thailand that provide traditional Thai massage which is therapeutic and non-sexual. However, the country also has a large number of massage parlors which are part of the country's sex industry. These premises typically contain a large glass window behind which clothed women sit wearing identification numbers. Once one of them is chosen by a customer, she takes him into a private room for a bath and sexual services (oral sex or penetrative sex). Instead of a salary, the women receive a proportion of the fee paid by the customer, and they are also given tips. Massage parlor workers typically earn around twice what is earned by those working in conventional brothels, mainly due to their having a greater number of customers.

In 1996, foreign women made up the majority of prostitutes from forty sex establishments in eighteen border provinces that were actually brothels masquerading as karaoke bars, restaurants and traditional massage parlours. In some venues though, there were no Thai women at all. In mid-1997, an increasing number of young girls, more than 60% of which were under 18 years old, were entering Thailand through the Mae Sai checkpoint into massage parlors, brothels, etc.

The legal difference between a "spa" and a "massage parlour" is unclear. The Federation of Thai Spa Associations (FTSPA) in 2016 urged authorities to clamp down on sexual services being offered at some massage parlours. The FTSPA maintains that influential figures have used legal loopholes to open "pretty spas" or massage parlours where tourists can buy sexual services.

== United Kingdom ==
Prostitution in the United Kingdom is itself legal, but activities such as pimping and owning or managing a brothel are not. However, the laws are not always strictly enforced. Many brothels in cities such as Manchester and London and Cardiff operate through legitimate businesses which are licensed as "Massage Parlours" and operate under that name. Police forces often turn a blind eye to such establishments. McCoy's British Massage Parlour Guide, a directory of women and businesses that provide sexual services, is published by George McCoy. Massage parlours are sometimes advertised in newspapers, but a newspaper which carries advertising for a brothel under the guise of a massage parlour may be liable to prosecution for money laundering offences under the Proceeds of Crime Act 2002. The Newspaper Society's guidelines suggest that their members (the majority of local newspapers) refuse to carry advertisements for sexual services. The advice also warns publishers that massage parlours can disguise illegal offers of sexual services and it suggests checking qualifications to ensure the advertised service is legitimate. Newspaper companies often adopt a policy of refusing all advertisements for massage parlours.

In 2005, it was reported that, in Manchester, there were around eighty "massage parlours" which were fronts for prostitution and that the police ignored those establishments, focusing instead on reducing street prostitution. On 12 October 2005, the Manchester Evening News reported that a "self-confessed pimp walked free from court after a judge was told police had 'turned a blind eye' to organised prostitution in massage parlours in Manchester."

In December 2007, the Manchester Evening News removed all advertisements for massage parlours from its personal columns. The move followed a meeting between ministers and newspaper and advertising industry representatives. It also followed comments by Harriet Harman, Minister for Women and Equality, in the House of Commons on 25 October that some local newspapers were promoting slavery by running sex adverts for foreign women.

== United States ==
Massage parlors in the United States have been linked to prostitution since the nineteenth century. In 2019 it was reported that the Polaris Project estimated there were around 9,000 massage parlors in the US providing sexual services. Most of the staff were Chinese women. The larger cities of the US typically have hundreds of massage parlors, and they are often also present in small towns.

Between 1980 and 2009, massage parlors in Rhode Island (also known there as "spas") were known to be involved in prostitution. Prostitution in Rhode Island was legal at that time as long as it was "behind closed doors". The 2009 documentary Happy Endings? follows women who worked in the Asian massage parlors of Rhode Island. The film focuses on "full service" massage parlors, although "rub and tug" massage parlors (where only handjobs are offered) are also covered.

As of 2010, there were an estimated 525 massage parlors in New Jersey acting as fronts for the prostitution industry.

An ongoing study of the prostitution business in New York City by the Sociology Department of Columbia University found that, between 1991 and 2010, the rise of the Internet and mobile phones "have enabled some sex workers to professionalize their trade", with a shift from street walking to "indoor" markets (including massage parlors and escort agencies), a geographical change in the concentration of sex work, and the growth of a more expensive luxury market. In January 2011, an investigation by Time Out New York found New York City massage parlors charging a "house fee" (which is usually paid, up front to the parlor's mama-san) of $60 to $100 per visit, with an extra tip for the sex workers (usually around $40) for a massage and a basic "happy ending" (or manual stimulation of the penis until orgasm). Most of the massage parlors reviewed were very strict about the female masseuse not being touched by the male client, but, in some parlors, further contact could be negotiated.

In many large US cities there are Asian massage parlours, some advertising traditional Thai massage. In some cases these establishments are fronts for prostitution. As of 2005, more than forty Asian massage parlors (mostly Korean) operated as fronts for in-call brothels in Washington, D.C., and each earned an average of $1.2 million a year. More than 200 other massage parlors (that did not openly advertise and were operated largely out of private homes and apartments) serving mainly Latino clients made an average of at least $800,000 a year.

Sex acts performed at massage parlors can range from a basic "happy ending" to oral sex or "full service". Some, mostly Asian, massage parlors offer a naked "table shower" or an "Asian body slide" as well as access to a sauna before a massage and/or any sexual activity takes place.

During the 2000s publications in major metropolitan areas of the US were under pressure not to advertise massage parlor operations. After the Fight Online Sex Trafficking Act (FOSTA) became law on 11 April 2018 the classified advertising website Craigslist removed all of their personal advertisements. Another classified advertising website, Backpage, was shut down by federal officials during the same month. The closure of Backpage substantially benefited the massage parlor review website RubMaps, which covers Asian massage parlors in the US. The site was under investigation by US authorities in 2019, a process made more difficult by the site's corporate structures and domain name having moved to Europe.

Law enforcement agencies in the US attempt to shut down or fine massage parlor establishments that break federal, state or local laws. The penalty for breaking the law in these instances can be as high as life imprisonment in some cases, especially those that involve human trafficking.

== See also ==
- Human trafficking
- Mama-san – female manager of Asian brothels or massage parlors
- Massage Parlor Murders! – 1970s American film
- Nuru – type of erotic massage
- Types of prostitution in modern Japan
