= International Sex Worker Foundation for Art, Culture and Education =

International Sex Worker Foundation for Art, Culture, and Education

The International Sex Worker Foundation for Art, Culture, and Education (ISWFACE) is a California corporation formed as an art and education and resource center for research about prostitution and sex work, and for the collection and preservation of art by and about sex workers.

== Information ==
Its founder and president, Norma Jean Almodovar, is a former LAPD traffic officer, and is also the executive director of COYOTE LA, the Los Angeles chapter of COYOTE. ISWFACE runs the Dumas Brothel Museum in Montana. ISWFACE is a non-profit organization that runs off of donations and sale of the products being created. They want to positively affect the lives of sex workers, and to encourage their artistic work. ISWFACE is a public benefit corporation, organized under the California Non-Profit Public Benefit Corporation Law for public and charitable purposes that is dedicated to offering funding to individuals who have experience with being a sex worker and consider themselves artists.

== Works ==
The organization wants to allow them to create and show their work, such as:

- performance art
- music
- books
- documentaries
- photos
- contributions to cultural heritage of sex workers

== Courses ==
The courses the ICWFACE provides interactive educational courses online that include:

- disprove the lies of prostitution
- how to exhibit art work
- the history of prostitution
- AIDS and safe sex
- reproductive health and family planning
- different countries dealing with prostitution
- sex work and the law
- communities seeking solutions to public prostitution problems
- prostitution in literature
- prostitution in film
- prostitution and feminism
