= Eugene Schoenfeld =

American physician

Dr. Eugene Schoenfeld, known as Dr. HipPocrates (born March 17, 1935, in New York City), was a popular underground newspaper columnist in the 1960s and 1970s.

== Origins of "Dr. Hip" ==
Publisher Max Scherr of the Berkeley Barb was a friend of Schoenfeld's, and it was Scherr's idea to have a column addressing questions about human health and behavior posed by readers. Scherr also suggested the moniker Dr. Hip. Inquiries regarding new health concerns during the sexual revolution and the drug culture of the 1960s were the most common, and Dr. Hip's advice was refreshingly straightforward and nonjudgmental.

== Dr. Hip columns ==
Upon returning from Africa to the Bay Area in 1966, Schoenfeld was asked many questions, "somewhat furtively", by friends, acquaintances, and patients about new concerns arising primarily from sexual freedom and drug use, and these inquiries were not topics that could be broached with their own doctors. The anti-censorship philosophy that inspired the awakening of an underground press in the 1960s allowed Schoenfeld the freedom to answer those forbidden questions. His "Dr. Hip" column became a popular source of reliable, common-sense information. Schoenfeld published his column from 1967 to 1973 and again from 1978 to 1979 in the underground, as well as various mainstream newspapers including the Chicago Sun Times, Tampa Times, San Francisco Chronicle, and the San Francisco Examiner. Soon he began publishing books developed from his experiences with the advice column.

Distrustful of establishment sources of any kind, the advice dispensed in the Dr. Hip columns was one of the few sources of medical information the hippie generation would listen to. His books, Dear Dr. HipPocrates, Natural Food and Unnatural Acts, Jealousy: Taming the Green-Eyed Monster, and Dr. Hip's Down-To-Earth Health Guide, had an empowering effect on those people. Dr. Schoenfeld was a pioneering radio personality on Bay Area stations in the 1970s, and subsequent talk show doctors credit him for being a trailblazer.

== Medical career ==
Schoenfeld has been the primary care physician to several famous individuals, including Timothy Leary, Hunter Thompson, and David Crosby.

Schoenfeld now practices psychiatry in San Rafael, California, where he lives with his wife and daughter.
