= Happy Endings? =

- Promotional poster
- Directed by: Tara Hurley
- Produced by: It's Not Easy Productions
- Cinematography: Nick Marcoux; Tara Hurley
- Edited by: Nick Marcoux
- Music by: Tim O'Keffe; James Reed
- Release date: February 28, 2009
- Running time: 81 minutes
- Country: United States
- Language: English

Happy Endings? is a 2009 cinéma vérité documentary film directed and produced by Tara Hurley. Filmed over 27 months, it chronicles the lives of the women in massage parlors in Rhode Island during a battle in the state legislature to once again make prostitution illegal. During the period of filming, prostitution in Rhode Island was legal as long as it was conducted behind closed doors.

The expression "happy ending" is a colloquial term for the practice of a masseuse giving a sexual release to a client.

== Content ==
The film explores the Asian massage industry in Rhode Island. Relying heavily on guerrilla filmmaking techniques, Happy Endings? follows the life of one spa worker ("Heather") while intertwining interviews with two other spa workers, the then Providence Mayor David Cicilline, Providence's Police Vice department, State Representative Joanne Giannini, State Senator Rhoda Perry, the staff of The Providence Phoenix, local residents, and "johns", "janes" or massage parlor clients.

Over the course of two years, the viewer sees the debate change from the creation of laws against prostitution to laws against prostitution and human trafficking. Although this link is never proven in the film, human trafficking is discussed at length.

Through candid, one-on-one interviews, the film offers insight into the lives of the women at the center of the debate, the struggles of its subjects, and the strength that they maintain in order to survive. Because the women in the massage parlors did not want their names revealed, the director renamed all of the sex workers after her roommates while studying as an undergraduate at Providence College.

== Underground film ==
Happy Endings? is considered an underground film in style, genre and financing. The world première was at the Anthology Film Archives in New York as part of the Cinekink film festival of 2009. It was also shown in the Brattle Theatre in Cambridge, Massachusetts and AS220 in Providence.

== Film participants ==
- Providence Mayor David Cicilline
- State Representative Joanne Giannini
- State Senator Rhoda Perry
- Professor Donna M. Hughes
- Steven Brown of the Rhode Island ACLU
- Stephen Brown, publisher Providence Phoenix
- Providence Vice Squad
- Women of the Asian massage parlors

== See also ==
- Erotic massage
- Massage parlor
- Prostate massage
