= Nuru (massage) =

Erotic body-to-body massage of Japanese origin

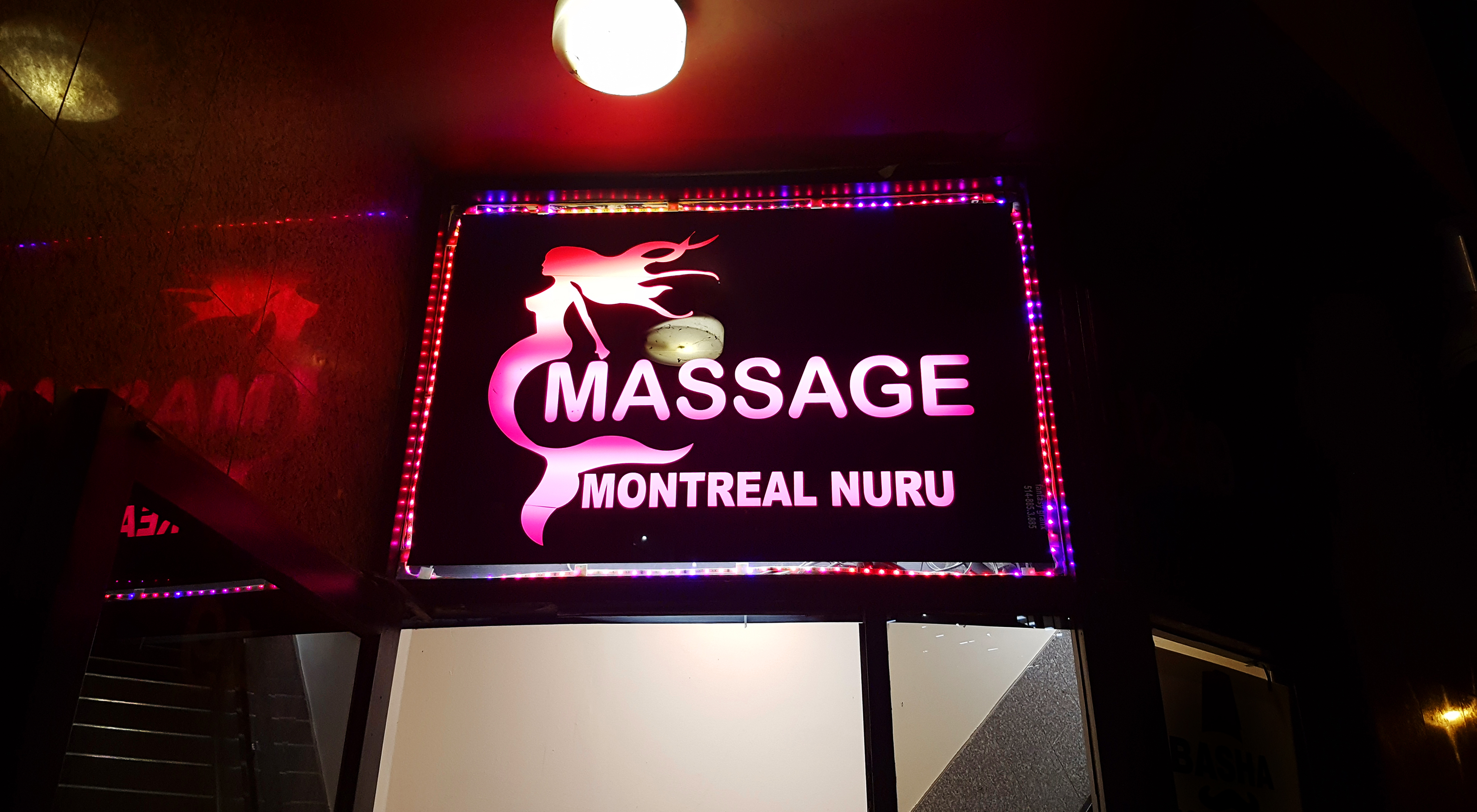
Neon sign of Montreal Massage Nuru

Nuru massage (Japanese: ぬる, nuru "slippery") is a form of erotic full-body massage that originated in Japan. It is characterized by the use of a water-soluble, slippery gel that allows extensive skin-to-skin contact. The giver glides their naked body over the receiver's body to create a sensual experience.

Nuru gel is traditionally made from seaweeds high in fucoidan, such as Sphaerotrichia divaricata. However, modern nuru gels are typically made with sodium polyacrylate.

== Etymology and origins ==
The Japanese word nuru (ぬる) means "slippery" or "slimy". The practice is reported to have emerged in the 1990s in Yokohama, associated with soapland establishments. From there, it spread in Japan and later gained international attention.

== Technique ==
Nuru massage is typically performed on a waterproof mattress or vinyl sheet. A gel, often derived from seaweed extracts, is applied to both participants to enable smooth body gliding. Unlike therapeutic massage, it is designed primarily as an erotic and sensual experience rather than for medical or anatomical benefit.

== Distribution and commercial use ==
In the early 2000s, Nuru massage began appearing outside Japan, particularly in the United States and Europe. Some commercial parlors and brothels feature dedicated "Nuru rooms". For example, a legal Nevada brothel has advertised a Nuru-themed suite.

== Reception and criticism ==
Advocates emphasize the high degree of intimacy and sensuality. Critics point to its overlap with the sex industry and proximity to pornography. Because it is commonly offered as part of erotic services, it has been subject to legal and cultural controversy.

== Scientific context and well-being ==
There are no peer-reviewed studies directly evaluating Nuru massage. However, broader research on massage and intimacy provides indirect context:

- A couples' massage program improved mental well-being, reduced perceived stress, and enhanced relationship satisfaction.
- A related paper described "Positive Massage" as a preventive intervention for couples, highlighting relaxation and relationship benefits.
- A qualitative scoping review summarized evidence that massage therapy can support mental health and well-being in people with serious illness, though not in erotic contexts.

Medical portals classify the HIV risk of Nuru-style massage without bodily fluid exchange as very low.

== Consumer safety ==
Due to the commercial nature of many websites advertising Nuru massage services, consumer advocates have noted that fraudulent listings and scams can occur on some online platforms. Common recommendations include verifying the legitimacy of a provider before making any advance payment, checking for independent reviews, confirming contact details, and using reputable platforms with transparent business practices where available. These precautions may help reduce the risk of fraud associated with online bookings.

== Legal and regulatory issues ==
Because Nuru massage is frequently associated with erotic or sexual services, it often falls under prostitution in various countries. The United States associates Nuru with massage therapy services.
