= Ana J. Bridges =

Assistant professor at the University of Arkansas

- Born: Ana Julia Bridges

Academic background
- Education: University of Rhode Island
- Thesis: Romantic couples and partner use of sexually explicit material: the mediating role of cognitions for dyadic and sexual satisfaction (2007)
- Website: University of Arkansas

Ana Julia Bridges is an assistant professor at the department of psychological science, University of Arkansas, and one of the chief editors of the journal Sexualization, Media, and Society.

== Education ==
Bridges received her PhD in clinical psychology from the University of Rhode Island in 2007.

== Bibliography ==
=== Books ===
- Bridges, Ana J. (2007). Romantic couples and partner use of sexually explicit material: the mediating role of cognitions for dyadic and sexual satisfaction (Ph.D. thesis). University of Rhode Island. OCLC 247499203.

=== Chapters in books ===
- Bridges, Ana J. (2010), "Pornography's effects on interpersonal relationships", in Stoner, Jr., James R.; Hughes, Donna M. (eds.), The social costs of pornography: a collection of papers, Princeton, New Jersey: Witherspoon Institute, pp. 89–110, ISBN 9780981491134. Pdf.
- Bridges, Ana J. (2010), "Methodological considerations in mapping pornography content", in Boyle, Karen (ed.), Everyday pornography, London New York: Routledge, pp. 34–49, ISBN 9780415543781.
- Bridges, Ana J.; Senn, Charlene Y.; Andrews III, Arthur R. (2013), "Erotica, pornography, and women's sexuality", in Castañeda, Donna (ed.), The essential handbook of women's sexuality: volume one: meanings, development, and worldwide views, Santa Barbara, California: Praeger, pp. 253–272, ISBN 9780313397097.
- Bridges, Ana J.; Anton, Corinne (2013), "Pornography and violence against women", in Sigal, Janet A.; Denmark, Florence L. (eds.), Violence against girls and women: international perspectives, Santa Barbara, California: Praeger, An Imprint of ABC-CLIO, LLC, pp. 183–206, ISBN 9781440803352.

=== Journal articles ===
2000 - 2004

- Bridges, Ana J.; Bergner, Raymond M. (May–June 2002). "The significance of heavy pornography involvement for romantic partners: research and clinical implications". Journal of Sex & Marital Therapy. 28 (3): 193–206. doi:10.1080/009262302760328235. PMID 11995598. S2CID 34475289.
- Bridges, Ana J.; Bergner, Raymond M.; Hesson-McInnis, Matthew (January 2003). "Romantic partners' use of pornography: its significance for women". Journal of Sex & Marital Therapy. 29 (1): 1–14. doi:10.1080/713847097. PMID 12519658. S2CID 144643439. View online.

2005 - 2009

- Bridges, Ana J.; Holler, Karen A. (October 2007). "How many is enough? Determining optimal sample sizes for normative studies in pediatric neuropsychology". Child Neuropsychology: A Journal on Normal and Abnormal Development in Childhood and Adolescence. 13 (6): 528–538. doi:10.1080/09297040701233875. PMID 17852130. S2CID 205625651.
- Bridges, Ana J.; Sun, Chyng; Wosnitzer, Robert; Scharrer, Erica; Liberman, Rachael (September 2008). "A comparison of male and female directors in popular pornography: what happens when women are at the helm?". Psychology of Women Quarterly. 32 (3): 312–325. doi:10.1111/j.1471-6402.2008.00439.x. S2CID 143657655.

2010 - 2014

- Bridges, Ana J.; Wosnitzer, Robert; Scharrer, Erica; Sun, Chyng; Liberman, Rachael (October 2010). "Aggression and sexual behavior in best-selling pornography videos: a content analysis update". Violence Against Women. 16 (10): 1065–1085. doi:10.1177/1077801210382866. PMID 20980228. S2CID 3708846. Pdf.
- Bridges, Ana J.; Adams, Thomas G. Jr.; Willems, Jeffrey L. (March 2011). "Contamination aversion and repeated exposure to disgusting stimuli". Anxiety, Stress & Coping. 24 (2): 157–165. doi:10.1080/10615806.2010.506953. PMID 20737324. S2CID 35454870.
- Bridges, Ana J.; Deen, Tisha L. (November 2011). "Depression literacy: rates and relation to perceived need and mental health service utilization in a rural American sample". Rural Remote Health. 11 (4): 1803. PMID 22126600. article no. 1803.
- Bridges, Ana J.; Morokoff, Patricia J. (December 2011). "Sexual media use and relational satisfaction in heterosexual couples". Personal Relationships. 18 (4): 562–585. doi:10.1111/j.1475-6811.2010.01328.x.
- Bridges, Ana J.; Deen, Tisha L.; McGahan, Tara C.; Andrews III, Arthur R. (Spring 2012). "Cognitive appraisals of specialty mental health services and their relation to mental health service utilization in the rural population". The Journal of Rural Health. 28 (2): 142–151. doi:10.1111/j.1748-0361.2011.00375.x. PMC 4060821. PMID 22458315.
- Bridges, Ana J.; Andrews III, Arthur R.; Deen, Tisha L. (October 2012). "Mental health needs and service utilization by Hispanic immigrants residing in mid-southern United States". Journal of Transcultural Nursing. 23 (4): 359–368. doi:10.1177/1043659612451259. PMC 4060822. PMID 22802297.
- Bridges, Ana J.; Pyle, Tara M. (December 2012). "Perceptions of relationship satisfaction and addictive behavior: comparing pornography and marijuana use" (PDF). Journal of Behavioral Addictions. 1 (4): 171–179. doi:10.1556/JBA.1.2012.007. PMID 26165604. Pdf.
- Bridges, Ana J.; Andrews III, Arthur R.; Gomez, Debbie (April 2013). "A multi-study analysis of conceptual and measurement issues related to health research on acculturation in Latinos". Journal of Transcultural Nursing. 24 (2): 134–143. doi:10.1177/1043659612472199. PMC 4060824. PMID 23361579.
- Bridges, Ana J.; Ham, Lindsay S.; Zamboanga, Byron L.; Casner, Hilary G.; Bacon, Amy K. (June 2013). "Alcohol expectancies and alcohol use frequency: does drinking context matter?". Cognitive Therapy and Research. 37 (3): 620–632. doi:10.1007/s10608-012-9493-0. S2CID 24445416.
- Bridges, Ana J.; Cooper, Theodore (June 2013). "Conducting research with Latino participants: blending community and science". The Behavior Therapist. 36 (5): 108–112.
- Bridges, Ana J.; Andrews III, Arthur R.; Villalobos, Bianca T.; Pastrana, Freddie A.; Cavell, Timothy A.; Gomez, Debbie (February 2014). "Does integrated behavioral health care reduce mental health disparities for Latinos? Initial findings". Journal of Latina/o Psychology. 2 (1): 37–53. doi:10.1037/lat0000009. PMC 4193502. PMID 25309845.
- Bridges, Ana J.; Karlsson, Marie E.; Bell, Jessica; Petretic, Patricia (June 2014). "Sexual violence therapy group in a women's correctional facility: a preliminary evaluation". Journal of Traumatic Stress. 27 (3): 361–364. doi:10.1002/jts.21911. PMID 24797176.
- Bridges, Ana J.; Gomez, Debbie; Andrews III, Arthur R.; Cavell, Timothy A.; Pastrana, Freddie A.; Gregus, Samantha J.; Ojeda, Carlos A. (August 2014). "Delivering parent management training in an integrated primary care setting: description and preliminary outcome data". Cognitive and Behavioral Practice. 21 (3): 296–309. doi:10.1016/j.cbpra.2014.04.003.
- Bridges, Ana J.; Johnson, Jennifer A.; Sun, Chyng; Ezzell, Matt B. (December 2014). "Pornography and the male sexual script: an analysis of consumption and sexual relations". Archives of Sexual Behavior. 45 (4): 983–994. doi:10.1007/s10508-014-0391-2. PMID 25466233. S2CID 20239480.

2015 onwards

- Bridges, Ana J.; Karlsson, Marie; Lindly, Elizabeth (January 2015). "The effect of brief, passive psychoeducation on knowledge and ratings of intimate partner violence in the United States and Argentina". Journal of Interpersonal Violence. 30 (2): 272–294. doi:10.1177/0886260514534775. PMID 24860079. S2CID 24090248.
- Bridges, Ana J.; Johnson, Jennifer A.; Dines, Gail; Condit, Deirdre M.; West, Carolyn M. (April 2015). "Introducing Sexualization, Media & Society". Sexualization, Media, & Society. 1 (1): 487–515. doi:10.1177/2374623815588763.
- Bridges, Ana J.; Gregus, Samantha J.; Rodriguez, Juventino Hernandez; Andrews III, Arthur R.; Villalobos, Bianca T.; Pastrana, Freddie A.; Cavell, Timothy A. (June 2015). "Diagnoses, intervention strategies, and rates of functional improvement in integrated behavioral health care patients". Journal of Consulting and Clinical Psychology. 83 (3): 590–601. doi:10.1037/a0038941. PMC 4762216. PMID 25774786.
- Bridges, Ana J.; Minarcik, Jennifer (June 2015). "Psychology graduate students weigh in: qualitative analysis of academic dishonesty and suggestion prevention strategies". Journal of Academic Ethics. 13 (2): 197–216. doi:10.1007/s10805-015-9230-x. S2CID 72638556.
- Bridges, Ana J.; Foubert, John D. (July 2015). "What is the attraction? Pornography use motives in relation to bystander intervention". Journal of Interpersonal Violence. 32 (20): 3071–3089. doi:10.1177/0886260515596538. PMID 26209307. S2CID 27057654. View online.
- Bridges, Ana J.; Andrews III, Arthur R.; Crone, Travis; Cholka, Cecilia B.; Cooper, Theodore V. (October 2015). "Correlational and experimental analyses of the relation between disgust and sexual arousal". Motivation and Emotion. 39 (5): 766–779. doi:10.1007/s11031-015-9485-y. PMC 4687750. PMID 26709322.
- Bridges, Ana J.; Johnson, Jennifer A.; Sun, Chyng; Ezzell, Matthew B. (October–December 2016). "Sexual scripts and the sexual behavior of men and women who use pornography". Sexualization, Media, & Society. 2 (4): 237462381666827. doi:10.1177/2374623816668275.
- Bridges, Ana J.; Karlsson, Marie E.; Zielinski, Melissa J. (November 2015). "Expanding research on a brief exposure-based group treatment with incarcerated women". Journal of Offender Rehabilitation. 54 (8): 599–617. doi:10.1080/10509674.2015.1088918. S2CID 143296715.
- Bridges, Ana J.; Anastasia, Elizabeth A. (December 2015). "Understanding service utilization disparities and depression in Latinos: the role of fatalismo". Journal of Immigrant and Minority Health. 17 (6): 1758–1764. doi:10.1007/s10903-015-0196-y. PMID 25801450. S2CID 448329.
- Bridges, Ana J.; Villalobos, Bianca T.; Anastasia, Elizabeth A.; Ojeda, Carlos A.; Rodriguez, Juventino Hernandez; Gomez, Debbie (February 2016). "Effects of language concordance and interpreter use on therapeutic alliance in Spanish-speaking integrated behavioral health care patients". Psychological Services. 13 (1): 49–59. doi:10.1037/ser0000051. PMID 26349073.
- Bridges, Ana J.; Larkin, Kevin T.; Fields, Scott A.; Vogel, Mark E. (February 2016). "Acquiring competencies in integrated behavioral health care in doctoral, internship, and postdoctoral programs". Training and Education in Professional Psychology. 10 (1): 14–23. doi:10.1037/tep0000099.
- Bridges, Ana J.; Foubert, John D. (May 2016). "Predicting bystander efficacy and willingness to intervene in college men and women: The role of exposure to varying levels of violence in pornography". Violence Against Women. 23 (6): 692–706. doi:10.1177/1077801216648793. PMID 27216476. S2CID 24625013. (Online first.)
- Bridges, Ana J.; Villalobos, Bianca T. (July 2016). "Testing an attribution model of caregiving in a Latino sample: the roles of Familismo and the caregiver–care recipient relationship". Journal of Transcultural Nursing. 27 (4): 322–32. doi:10.1177/1043659615590476. PMID 26082428. S2CID 206627002.
- Bridges, Ana J.; Dueweke, Aubrey R.; Gomez, Debbie P. (December 2016). "The effects of interpreter use on agreement between clinician- and self-ratings of functioning in Hispanic integrated care patients". Journal of Immigrant and Minority Health. 18 (6): 1547–1550. doi:10.1007/s10903-015-0288-8. PMID 26420489. S2CID 3403323.
- Bridges, Ana J.; McGahan, Tara (in preparation). "What traits do men and women want in a romantic partner? Stated preferences versus actual behavior"

=== Media ===
- Bridges, Ana J. (11 November 2012). "Some pornography scenes are wholesome, others degrading". The New York Times.
