= Stephen B. Levine =

American psychiatrist (born 1942)

- Born: Stephen Barrett Levine; 1942 (age 83–84); Pittsburgh, Pennsylvania
- Known for: Standards of Care for the Health of Transgender and Gender Diverse People (Version 5); Founding Case Western Reserve University Gender Identity Clinic; Expert witness testimony against gender-affirming care, including Bell v Tavistock and United States v. Skrmetti
- Scientific career
- Patrons: Alliance Defending Freedom, Society for Evidence-Based Gender Medicine, Genspect

Stephen Barrett Levine (born 1942) is an American psychiatrist and professor. He is known for his thesis that gender dysphoria and being transgender are often caused by psychological issues that should be treated psychoanalytically rather than with gender-affirming care. He co-founded Case Western Reserve University School of Medicine's Gender Identity Clinic in 1974, served as the chair of the World Professional Association for Transgender Health (WPATH) drafting committee for the 5th edition of their Standards of Care (SOC-5) published 1998, and served on the American Psychiatric Association (APA) DSM-IV (1994) Subcommittee on Gender Identity Disorders.

He has since distanced himself from these organizations, arguing they are more concerned with civil rights than evidence and too receptive to the transgender community. Since 2006 he has worked with U.S. state prisons to deny transgender inmates medical and social transitions. In recent years, he has worked with the Alliance Defending Freedom to support anti-trans legislation as an expert witness. He has supported banning gender-affirming care for minors, overturning bans on conversion therapy, preventing transgender students from participating in sports matching their identity, and forcing schools to out them to their parents. He is a member of Genspect and the Society for Evidence-Based Gender Medicine.

== Education and career ==
Levine was born in Pittsburgh, Pennsylvania, in 1942. He earned his M.D. from Case Western Reserve University School of Medicine in 1967 and serves as a Clinical Professor of Psychiatry there. His clinical practice began in the mid-1970s as the University Hospitals of Cleveland Sexual Dysfunction Clinic. In 1993 the Clinic separated from University Hospitals, and is presently called The Center for Marital and Sexual Health in Beachwood, Ohio.

His early work focused on premature ejaculation and erectile dysfunction, and he has written on a number of treatment options, including vacuum pumps, injections into the corpus cavernosum of the penis, and Viagra. The most potent aphrodisiacs, according to Levine, are psychological intimacy and voyeurism: "looking at pictures or movies of people engaged in genital or romantic interplay."

Levine has written on sex offenders, including professionals who offend. He cites Kurt Freund as an important influence because Freund wanted to define the subtypes of child molesters to help devise a means of prevention. Levine has written about adultery and infidelity and believes pejorative terms like "cheating" and "infidelity" prevent addressing the issue in realistic terms.

He was section co-editor with R. Taylor Segraves for the section on sexual and gender identity disorders in Treatments of Psychiatric Disorders by Glen Gabbard. Notable contributors included Martin Kafka (paraphilias) and Kenneth Zucker (gender identity disorder in children and adolescents).

Although much of his work is written for other clinicians, Levine has written books for a lay audience, including Solving Common Sexual Problems (1997) and Sexuality in Mid-Life (2004).

=== Work on transgender healthcare ===
In 1974 he created the Case Western Gender Identity Clinic to treat transgender people which recommended surgery for only 10% patients and he became an influential figure in trans healthcare in the 70s and 80s. Levine's approach emphasized psychoanalytic treatment for transgender people as opposed to medical interventions, arguing that people transition to "avoid painful intrapsychic problems" caused by factors such as "an overly long, excessively symbiotic" relationship with the patients mother. He has argued that transgender people are commonly pathologically narcissistic. In the 1990's, scientific consensus on transgender healthcare began to diverge from psychoanalytic theories as gender-affirming medical care was seen as more effective than therapy for treating gender dysphoria.

Levine was named Chair of the fifth edition of the World Professional Association for Transgender Health (WPATH) Standards of Care (SOC) in 1998, the last iteration to include "autogynephilia." He cut ties with WPATH in 2001 due to his view that they had become too responsive to transgender activists and patients. He argued that WPATH's biennial meetings being open to transgender people who weren't medical professionals limited "the ability for honest and scientific debate". He has criticized later editions of the SOC for no longer considering transgender identity a mental disorder, arguing that it's not true that "no form of gender identity is an abnormality", and stated there are "effective alternative approaches" to gender-affirming care, such as "gender exploratory therapy", which he argues are not a form of conversion therapy.

Levine served on the American Psychiatric Association (APA) DSM-IV (1994) Subcommittee on Gender Identity Disorders. He serves on the editorial board for the Archives of Sexual Behavior alongside Kenneth Zucker, Ray Blanchard, and J. Michael Bailey.

He is a member of Genspect and the Society for Evidence-Based Gender Medicine, scientifically fringe organizations formed in reaction to gender-affirming care. He has argued the mainstream medical establishment has moved to the fringe on transgender healthcare and that groups such as the APA were endorsing WPATH's updated SOC "on the basis of civil rights" instead of scientific evidence.

==== Lobbying ====
Since 2006, Levine has been frequently hired as an expert witness by American state prisons to testify against access to medical or social transition for trans prisoners, and been used by many prisons in a clinical context to deny said measures to individual prisoners. He works as the Gender Dysphoria Consultant for the Massachusetts Department of Corrections and denied all applications for surgery he received, arguing the patients wanted to transition due to sexual deviance, unresolved trauma, or to escape the moral opprobrium of their crimes.

Since then, he has served as an expert witness on nearly every transgender rights case in the United States for the parties opposing transgender rights. Levine has stated he is opposed to unilateral bans on gender affirming care, but has supported them as an expert witness for the Alliance Defending Freedom. He also presented evidence during Bell v Tavistock to support the United Kingdom NHS banning the prescription of puberty blockers to those under 16.

He has supported legislation that would forcibly out transgender youth to their parents and ban them playing on sports teams that match their identity, He also testified in favor of overturning Washington state's ban on conversion therapy.

In a Southern Poverty Law Center report, Levine is described as part of a network of established practitioners who advocate treating trans identity as mental illness best treated by conversion therapy, and regard changes in the DSM-5 and WPATH SOC 7 as a threat to their practices. The Southern Poverty Law Center disagrees with Levine's claim that gender exploratory therapy does not constitute conversion therapy.

== Selected publications ==
- Levine SB (1975). Premature ejaculation: Some thoughts about its pathogenesis. Journal of Sex & Marital Therapy Volume 1, Issue 4 Summer 1975, pages 326 – 334.
- Levine SB, Yost MA (1976). Frequency of sexual dysfunction in a general gynecological clinic: An epidemiological approach. Archives of Sexual Behavior Volume 5, Number 3 / May 1976, 229-238.
- Levine SB, Agle D (1978). The effectiveness of sex therapy for chronic secondary psychological impotence. Journal of Sex & Marital Therapy Volume 4, Issue 4 Winter 1978, pages 235 - 258
- Levine SB, Yost MA (1980). Psychiatric Diagnosis Of Patients Requesting Sex Reassignment Surgery. Journal of Sex & Marital Therapy Volume 6, Issue 3 Autumn 1980, pages 164 – 173.
- Levine SB, Lothstein L (1981). Transsexualism or the Gender Dysphoria Syndromes. Journal of Sex & Marital Therapy Volume 7, Issue 2 Summer 1981, pages 85 – 113.
- Levine SB (1982). A Modern Perspective on Nymphomania. Journal of Sex & Marital Therapy Volume 8, Issue 4 Winter 1982, pages 316 – 324.
- Levine SB, Shumaker RE (1983). Increasingly ruth: Toward understanding sex reassignment. Archives of Sexual Behavior Volume 12, Number 3 / June 1983, 247-261.
- Levine SB (1984). An essay on the nature of sexual desire. Journal of Sex & Marital Therapy Volume 10, Issue 2 Summer 1984, pages 83 – 96
- Levine SB (1987). More on the nature of sexual desire. Journal of Sex & Marital Therapy Volume 13, Issue 1 Spring 1987, pages 35 – 44.
- Levine SB (1989). Sex Is Not Simple. Ohio Psychology Publications. ISBN 978-0-910707-12-1
- Turner LA, Althof SE, Levine SB, et al. (1989). Self-injection of papaverine and phentolamine in the treatment of psychogenic impotence. Journal of Sex & Marital Therapy Volume 15, Issue 3 Autumn 1989, pages 163 – 176.
- Althof SE, Turner LA, Levine SB, Risen C, Kursh ED (1989). Why do so many people drop out from auto-injection therapy for impotence? Journal of Sex & Marital Therapy Volume 15, Issue 2 Summer 1989, pages 121 – 129.
- Althof SE, Turner LA, Levine SB, Risen CB, Bodner D, Kursh ED, Resnick MI (1991). Sexual, Psychological, and Marital Impact of Self-Injection of Papaverine and Phentolamine: A Long-Term Prospective Study. Journal of Sex & Marital Therapy Volume 17, Issue 2 Summer 1991, pages 101 – 112.
- Bradley SJ, Blanchard R, Coates SW, Green R, Levine SB, Meyer-Bahlburg HFL, Pauly IB, Zucker KJ (1991). Interim report of the DSM-IV Subcommittee on Gender Identity Disorders. Archives of Sexual Behavior Volume 20, Number 4 / August 1991
- Levine SB (1992). Sexual Life: A Clinician's Guide. Springer ISBN 978-0-306-44287-2
- Levine SB, ed. (1995). Clinical Sexuality (The Psychiatric Clinics of North America, Volume 18, Number 1, March 1995) W.B. Saunders Company ASIN B0014EBK6O
- Levine SB (1997). Solving Common Sexual Problems: Toward a Problem-Free Sexual Life. Jason Aronson. ISBN 978-0-7657-0121-3
- Segraves RT, Levine SB (section editors) Sexual and Gender Identity Disorders. In Gabbard GO, ed. (2001). Treatments of Psychiatric Disorders.
- Levine SB, Stagno SJ (2001). Informed Consent for Case Reports: The Ethical Dilemma of Right to Privacy Versus Pedagogical ... Journal of Psychotherapy Practice and Research
- Levine SB (2002). Reexploring the Concept of Sexual Desire. Journal of Sex & Marital Therapy
- Levine SB (2003). The Nature of Sexual Desire: A Clinician's Perspective. Archives of Sexual Behavior
- Levine SB, Risen CB, Althof SE, eds. (2003). Handbook of Clinical Sexuality for Mental Health Professionals. Psychology Press ISBN 1-58391-331-9
- Levine SB (2004). Sexuality in Mid-Life. Springer ISBN 978-0-306-48446-9
- Althof SE, Leiblum SR, Chevret-Measson M, et al. (2005). Psychological and Interpersonal Dimensions of Sexual Function and Dysfunction. Journal of Sexual Medicine
- Levine SB (2005). A Reintroduction to Clinical Sexuality. Focus, American Psychiatric Association
- Levine SB (2006). Demystifying Love: Plain Talk for the Mental Health Professional. Brunner-Routledge ISBN 978-0-415-95599-7
