= Robert Jensen =

American academic (born 1958)

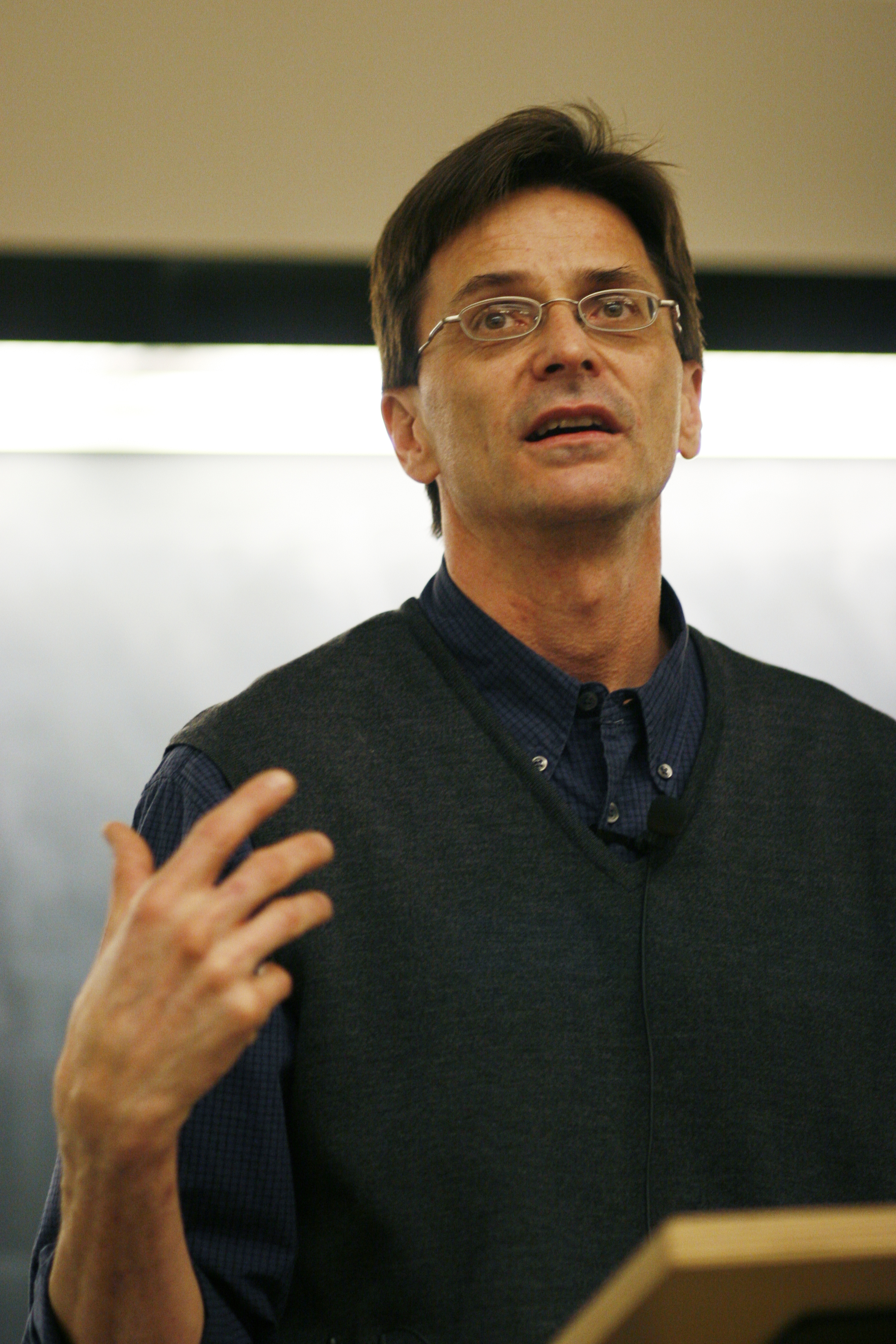
- Born: Robert William Jensen; July 14, 1958 (age 68)

Academic background
- Education: University of Minnesota
- Thesis: Knowing Pornography (1992)

Academic work
- Institutions: Moody College of Communication
- Main interests: Journalism and mass communication
- Notable works: Getting Off: Pornography and the End of Masculinity
- Notable ideas: Media law, ethics, and politics
- Website: http://robertwjensen.org/

Robert William Jensen (born July 14, 1958) is an American former professor of journalism from the University of Texas at Austin. From 1992 to 2018 he taught graduate and undergraduate courses in media law, ethics, and politics.

He has focused much of his work on the critique of pornography and of masculinity, developed in his 2017 book, The End of Patriarchy: Radical Feminism for Men. He also has written about white privilege and institutional racism. He also sits on the editorial board of the academic journal Sexualization, Media, and Society.

== Early life ==
Jensen grew up in Fargo, North Dakota.

== Education ==
In 1981, he received a Bachelor of Science degree from Moorhead State University (now Minnesota State University, Moorhead), and in 1985, he received a Master of Arts degree in journalism and public affairs from American University. In 1992 he completed his Ph.D. in media law and ethics in the School of Journalism and Mass Communication at the University of Minnesota.

== Career and activism ==
Prior to his academic career, he worked as a reporter and copy editor for several newspapers, including the St. Petersburg Times and the St. Paul Pioneer Press.

Jensen writes for popular media, both alternative and mainstream. His opinion and analytic pieces on such subjects as foreign policy, politics, and race have appeared in papers around the U.S. He also is involved in a number of activist groups, including the Third Coast Activist Resource Center.

== Controversy ==
=== 9/11 opinion piece ===
Jensen wrote an opinion piece for the Houston Chronicle on September 14, 2001, shortly after the September 11th terrorist attacks. In the piece, Jensen wrote that the September 11th terrorist attacks were "reprehensible and indefensible" but "no more despicable than the massive acts of terrorism – the deliberate killing of civilians for political purposes – that the U.S. government has committed during my lifetime."

Jensen's piece drew both praise and criticism. Some individuals demanded that The University of Texas fire Jensen. In response, University of Texas President Larry Faulkner wrote in a letter to the editor published in the Houston Chronicle that he was "disgusted by Jensen's article" and called Jensen "a fountain of undiluted foolishness on issues of public policy."

=== Views on transgender identity ===
In early July 2014, MonkeyWrench Books collective cut all ties with Jensen over his article reviewing two feminist books that critiqued transgender identity. These books were Sheila Jeffreys' Gender Hurts: A Feminist Analysis of the Politics of Transgenderism and Michael Schwalbe's Manhood Acts: Gender and the Practices of Domination. In the review published by Dissident Voice, Jensen concluded that, "On the surface, transgenderism may seem to be a more revolutionary approach, but radical feminism offers a deeper critique of the domination/subordination dynamic at the heart of patriarchy and a more promising path to liberation" which they felt "contributes to a dangerous culture of transphobia". In addition, Dexter M. Thomas wrote a rebuttal which was also published by Dissident Voice. Jensen responded by writing a follow-up article which elaborated on his views on the ecological and social implications of what he terms "trans ideology".

In 2024, Jensen published It’s Debatable: Talking Authentically about Tricky Topics at Olive Branch Press (an imprint of Interlink Publishing), a book discussing methods of conducting debates on controversial issues. Chapter 5, titled "Defining Sex/Gender: Beyond Trans Ideology", was left out of the original printing of the book; according to the official publisher's description, the chapter would discuss "the confused and confusing ideology of transgenderism". It was replaced in the book by a short note, where Jensen states that the publisher refused to include Chapter 5, due to their policy of support for transgender rights. The chapter was instead made available on Jensen's website.

== Personal life ==
Jensen identifies as a radical Christian who rejects the supernatural claims of Christian orthodoxy. Jensen is married to musician Eliza Gilkyson.

== Selected works ==
=== Books ===
- Jensen, Robert; Allen, David S. (1995). Freeing the first amendment: critical perspectives on freedom of expression. New York: New York University Press. ISBN 9780814706381.
- ———; Dines, Gail; Russo, Ann (1997). Pornography: the production and consumption of inequality. New York: Routledge. ISBN 9780415918138.
- ——— (2002). Writing dissent: taking radical ideas from the margins to the mainstream. New York: Peter Lang. ISBN 9780820456515.
- ——— (2004). Citizens of the empire: the struggle to claim our humanity. San Francisco: City Lights. ISBN 9780872864320.
- ——— (2005). The heart of whiteness: confronting race, racism and white privilege. San Francisco: City Lights. ISBN 9780872864498.
- ——— (2007). Getting off: pornography and the end of masculinity. Cambridge, Massachusetts: South End Press. ISBN 9780896087767.
- ——— (2009). All my bones shake: seeking a progressive path to the prophetic voice. Brooklyn: Soft Skull Press. ISBN 9781593763466.
- ——— (2013). We are all apocalyptic now: on the responsibilities of teaching, preaching, reporting, writing, and speaking out. San Francisco: City Lights Books. ISBN 9781481958479.
- ——— (2013). Arguing for our lives: critical thinking in crisis times. San Francisco: City Lights. ISBN 9780872865730.
- ——— (2015). Plain radical: living, loving and learning to leave the planet gracefully. Berkeley, California: Soft Skull Press. ISBN 9781619026797.
- ______ (2017). The End of Patriarchy: Radical Feminism for Men. Spinifex Press ISBN 9781742199924.
- ______ (2021). The Restless and Relentless Mind of Wes Jackson: Searching for Sustainability. University Press of KansasISBN 9780700630554.
- (2022) An Inconvenient Apocalypse: Environmental Collapse, Climate Crisis, and the Fate of Humanity co-authored with Wes Jackson.
- Jensen, Robert (2024). It's Debatable: Authentic Discussions about Tricky Topics. Olive Branch Press. ISBN 9781623716844.
- Jensen, Robert (2026). This I Don’t Believe: A Fulfilling Life without Meaning. Blue Ear Books. ISBN 9798192110263.

=== Book chapters ===
- Jensen, Robert (2004), "Knowing pornography", in Carter, Cynthia; Steiner, Linda (eds.), Critical readings: media and gender, Maidenhead: Open University Press, pp. 246–264, ISBN 9780335210985.
- ——— (2004), "Blows bangs and cluster bombs: the cruelty of men and Americans", in Whisnant, Rebecca; Stark, Christine (eds.), Not for sale: feminists resisting prostitution and pornography, North Melbourne, Victoria: Spinifex Press, pp. 28–37, ISBN 9781876756499
- ——— (2011), "Stories of a rape culture: pornography as propaganda", in Tankard Reist, Melinda; Bray, Abigail (eds.), Big Porn Inc.: exposing the harms of the global pornography industry, North Melbourne, Victoria: Spinifex Press, pp. 25–33, ISBN 9781876756895.

=== Journal articles ===
- Jensen, Robert (January 1992). "Fighting objectivity: the illusion of journalistic neutrality in coverage of the Persian Gulf War". Journal of Communication Inquiry. 16 (1): 20–32. doi:10.1177/019685999201600102. S2CID 143671785.
- ——— (September 1993). "Pornographic novels and the ideology of male supremacy". Howard Journal of Communications. 5 (1–2): 92–107. doi:10.1080/10646179309361653.
- ——— (March 1994). "Banning 'Redskins' from the sports page: the ethics and politics of Native American nicknames". Journal of Mass Media Ethics. 9 (1): 16–25. doi:10.1207/s15327728jmme0901_2.
- ——— (March 1995). "Pornographic lives". Violence Against Women. 1 (1): 32–54. doi:10.1177/1077801295001001003. PMID 12346571. S2CID 29885874.
- ——— (April 1995). "Pornography and affirmative conceptions of freedom". Women & Politics. 15 (1): 1–18. doi:10.1300/J014v15n01_01.
- ——— (January 1996). "The politics and ethics of lesbian and gay "wedding"; announcements in newspapers". Howard Journal of Communications. 7 (1): 13–28. doi:10.1080/10646179609361710.
- ——— (March 1996). "Knowing pornography". Violence Against Women. 2 (1): 82–102. doi:10.1177/1077801296002001005. PMID 12348987. S2CID 37190400.
- ——— (March 1996). "What are journalists for?". Peace Review: A Journal of Social Justice. 8 (1): 21–26. doi:10.1080/10402659608425925.
- ——— (June 1996). "Journalists and the overtime provisions of the Fair Labor Standards Act". Journalism & Mass Communication Quarterly. 73 (2): 417–426. doi:10.1177/107769909607300212. S2CID 144893231.
- ——— (January 1997). "Privilege, power, and politics in research: A response to 'Crossing sexual orientations'". International Journal of Qualitative Studies in Education. 10 (1): 25–30. doi:10.1080/095183997237377.
- ——— (July 1998). "Signs of struggle: voices from the anti-pornography movement". Books-on-Law. 1 (4). JURIST. Archived from the original on January 11, 2014.

Review of: Dworkin, Andrea; MacKinnon, Catharine (1997). In harm's way: the pornography civil rights hearings. Cambridge, Massachusetts: Harvard University Press. ISBN 9780674445796.

- ——— (September 1998). "First Amendment potluck". Communication Law and Policy. 3 (4): 563–588. doi:10.1080/10811689809368664.
- ——— (December 2003). "Patriotism's a bad idea at a dangerous time". Peace Review: A Journal of Social Justice. 15 (4): 389–396. doi:10.1080/1040265032000156744. S2CID 144182623.
- ——— (March 2004). "September 11 and the failures of American intellectuals". Communication and Critical/Cultural Studies. 1 (1): 80–88. doi:10.1080/1479142042000180935. S2CID 145476693.
- ——— (September 2004). "Homecoming". Journal of Homosexuality. 47 (3–4): 75–81. doi:10.1300/J082v47n03_05. PMID 15451705. S2CID 216115618.
- ——— (January 2006). "Book review: Gay Male Pornography: An Issue of Sex Discrimination". Men and Masculinities. 8 (3): 371–373. doi:10.1177/1097184X05277702. S2CID 144886886.

Review of: Kendall, Christopher N. (2004). Gay male pornography an issue of sex discrimination. Vancouver, British Columbia, Canada: UBC Press. ISBN 9780774851152.

- ——— (January–March 2016). "Pornographic values: hierarchy and hubris". Sexualization, Media, and Society. 2 (1): 237462381562778. doi:10.1177/2374623815627787. Pdf.

=== Films ===
- Miguel Picker and Chyng Sun (producer / director), Robert Jensen (senior consultant / participant) (2008). The price of pleasure: pornography, sexuality and relationships (film). Media Education Foundation. 55 mins
- Abe Osheroff (producer), Nadeem Uddin (director), Robert Jensen (participant) (2009). One foot in the grave the other still dancing (film). Media Education Foundation. 46 mins
- Sut Jhally (co-director), Bathsheba Ratzkoff (co-director), and Robert Jensen (participant) (2004). Peace, propaganda and the promised land: media & the Israel-Palestine conflict (documentary) (YouTube). Forces in Motion – via YouTube.

=== Speeches ===
- Robert Jensen (speech) (October 30, 2008). Robert Jensen: The American Dream dead? (YouTube). Joe Friendly – via YouTube.
- Robert Jensen (talk organized by the USC School of Social Work) (April 1, 2009). Uprising special: Robert Jensen on white supremacy, patriarchy, and capitalism (Audio). Uprising with Sonali. Recording by Global Voices for Justice.
- Robert Jensen (speech) (July 1, 2009). Robert Jensen "The Color of the Race Problem Is White" (YouTube). DESUUUUUUUUU – via YouTube.
- Robert Jensen (speech) (October 2, 2009). Robert Jensen;Feminism and Masculinity, Minnesota Mens Action Network (YouTube). DESUUUUUUUUU – via YouTube.
- Robert Jensen (speech) (January 14, 2010). Robert Jensen;Beyond Multiculturalism (YouTube). DESUUUUUUUUU – via YouTube.

=== Press ===
- Thorne Dreyer (host), Robert Jensen (guest) (July 8, 2011). Rag Radio 2011-07-08 / Journalism Professor, Author, and Radical Activist Robert Jensen (Radio). KOOP 91.7-FM. (one hour)
- Jensen, Robert; Dines, Gail (11 November 2012). "A pornography habit destroys relationships". The New York Times.
- Jensen, Robert; Collins, Hubert (18 February 2022). 10 Questions for Radical Feminist Robert Jensen. Counter-Currents.
