= Jennifer A. Johnson =

American sociologist

Academic background
- Education: Radford University (BS); Virginia Commonwealth University (MS); University of Virginia (PhD)
- Thesis: Women at the center: a review of theories using the female offender as the target population (1993)
- Website: https://sociology.vcu.edu/person/jennifer-johnson/

Jennifer Ann Johnson is assistant professor of sociology at Virginia Commonwealth University, and one of the chief editors of the journal Sexualization, Media, and Society.

== Education ==
Johnson received her BS in sociology from Radford University in 1985, her MS in sociology from Virginia Commonwealth University in 1993, and her PhD in sociology from the University of Virginia in 2004. Her doctoral thesis was entitled The Geography of Gender: Ritual as Residence.

== Bibliography ==
=== Books ===
- Johnson, Jennifer A. (1993). Women at the center: a review of theories using the female offender as the target population (MS thesis). Virginia Commonwealth University. OCLC 30497137.

=== Chapters in books ===
- Johnson, Jennifer A. (2010), "To catch a curious clicker: a social network analysis of the online pornography industry", in Boyle, Karen (ed.), Everyday pornography, London New York: Routledge, pp. 147–163, ISBN 9780415543781.

=== Journal articles ===
- Johnson, Jennifer A.; Johnson, Megan S. (April 2008). "New city domesticity and the tenacious second shift". Journal of Family Issues. 29 (4): 487–515. doi:10.1177/0192513X07310313. S2CID 145779921.
- Johnson, Jennifer A.; Brubaker, Sarah Jane (June 2008). "'Pack a more powerful punch' and 'lay the pipe': erectile enhancement discourse as a body project for masculinity". Journal of Gender Studies. 17 (2): 131–146. doi:10.1080/09589230802008899. S2CID 55263860.
- Johnson, Jennifer A. (March 2009). "The window of ritual: seeing the intentions and emotions of 'doing' gender". Gender Issues. 26 (1): 65–84. doi:10.1007/s12147-009-9069-9. S2CID 145100939.
- Johnson, Jennifer A.; Redford, Jeremy; Honnold, Julie (2009). "Parenting practices, cultural capital and educational outcomes: the effects of concerted cultivation on academic achievement". Race, Gender & Class. 16 (1–2): 25–44. JSTOR 41658859.
- Johnson, Jennifer A. (August 2011). "Mapping the feminist political economy of the online commercial pornography industry: a network approach". International Journal of Media & Cultural Politics. 7 (2): 189–208. doi:10.1386/macp.7.2.189_1.
- Johnson, Jennifer A.; Honnold, Julie; Threlfall, Perry (December 2011). "Impact of social capital on employment and marriage among low income single mothers". Journal of Society & Social Welfare. 38 (4): 9–31. Pdf.
- Johnson, Jennifer A.; Bridges, Ana J.; Sun, Chyng; Ezzell, Matt B. (December 2014). "Pornography and the male sexual script: an analysis of consumption and sexual relations". Archives of Sexual Behavior. 45 (4): 983–994. doi:10.1007/s10508-014-0391-2. PMID 25466233. S2CID 20239480.
- Johnson, Jennifer A.; Bridges, Ana J.; Dines, Gail; Condit, Deirdre M.; West, Carolyn M. (April 2015). "Introducing Sexualization, Media & Society". Sexualization, Media, and Society. 1 (1): 487–515. doi:10.1177/2374623815588763.
- Johnson, Jennifer A.; Bridges, Ana J.; Sun, Chyng; Ezzell, Matthew B. (October–December 2016). "Sexual scripts and the sexual behavior of men and women who use pornography". Sexualization, Media, & Society. 2 (4): 237462381666827. doi:10.1177/2374623816668275.
