= Robert Taylor Segraves =

American psychiatrist (born 1941)

- Born: 1941 (age 84–85)
- Education: Baylor School; Vanderbilt University (BA, MD); University of London (PhD)
- Occupations: Psychiatrist; sexologist

Robert Taylor Segraves (born 1941) is an American psychiatrist who works on sexual dysfunction and its pharmacologic causes and treatments.

== Career ==
Segraves attended the Baylor School in Chattanooga, Tennessee and graduated with a Bachelor of Arts from Vanderbilt University in 1963 and would later receive a M.D. from the same institution. He completed his residency in psychiatry at the University of Chicago and earned a Ph.D. from the University of London. Segraves is professor of psychiatry at Case Western Reserve University School of Medicine and chair of the department of psychiatry at MetroHealth medical center.

He was a member of the Diagnostic and Statistical Manual of Mental Disorders task forces on sexual disorders for the DSM-III-R, DSM-IV and DSM-IV-TR editions. He is editor of the Journal of Sex and Marital Therapy and on the editorial board of the International Journal of Impotence Research.

Much of Segraves' work focuses on female sexual arousal disorder (FSAD). Noting that "somehow depression and libido are interconnected," Segraves has examined the interplay between antidepressants and libido. He has conducted pilot studies and clinical trials on drugs that show promise in improving female sexual response, including bupropion.

Segraves was section co-editor with Stephen B. Levine for the section on sexual and gender identity disorders in Treatments of Psychiatric Disorders by Glen Gabbard. Notable contributors included Martin Kafka (paraphilias) and Kenneth Zucker (gender identity disorder in children and adolescents).

== Selected publications ==
- Segraves RT (1982). Marital Therapy: A Combined Psychodynamic-behavioral Approach. Plenum Medical Book Co. ISBN 0-306-40936-4
- Segraves RT, Haeberle EJ (1984). Emerging Dimensions of Sexology: Selected Papers from the Proceedings of the Sixth World Congress of Sexology. Greenwood Pub Group ISBN 0-275-91451-8
- Segraves RT, Schoenberg HW (1985). Diagnosis and Treatment of Erectile Disturbances: A Guide for Clinicians. Plenum Medical Book Co. ISBN 0-306-41871-1
- Basson R, Berman J, Burnett A, Derogatis L, Ferguson D, Fourcroy J, Goldstein I, Graziottin A, Heiman J, Laan E, Leiblum S, Padma-Nathan H, Rosen R, Segraves K, Segraves RT, Shabsigh R, Sipski M, Wagner G, Whipple B (2001). Report of the International Consensus Development Conference on Female Sexual Dysfunction: Definitions and Classifications. Journal of Sex & Marital Therapy, Volume 27, Issue 2 March 2001, pages 83 – 94.
- Coleman CC, King BR, Bolden-Watson C, Book MJ, Segraves RT, Richard N, Ascher J, Batey S, Jamerson B, Metz A (2001). A placebo-controlled comparison of the effects on sexual functioning of bupropion sustained release and fluoxetine. Clinical Therapeutics. Volume 23, Issue 7, July 2001, Pages 1040-1058.
- Segraves RT, Balon R (2003). Sexual Pharmacology: Fast Facts. Norton ISBN 0-393-70354-1, W W Norton page
- Segraves RT, Clayton A, Croft H, Wolf A, Warnock J (2004). Bupropion sustained release for the treatment of hypoactive sexual desire disorder in premenopausal women. Journal of Clinical Psychopharmacology 24(3):339-342.
- Balon R, Segraves RT (2005). Handbook of Sexual Dysfunction. Taylor & Francis Ltd. ISBN 1-4200-2860-X
- Levine SB, Segraves RT (2007). Sexual and Gender Identity Disorders. In Gabbard GO (ed.). Gabbard's Treatments of Psychiatric Disorders. American Psychiatric Pub, Inc. ISBN 1-58562-216-8
