= Ronald Weitzer =

American criminologist

- Born: 1952 (age 73–74)
- Education: University of California, Berkeley (PhD, 1985); University of California, Berkeley (MA, 1978); University of California, Santa Cruz (BA, Honors, 1975)
- Known for: Research on police-minority relations, including racial profiling, and studies of the sex industry, prostitution laws, and trafficking policy.
- Scientific career
- Fields: Sociology, Criminology
- Workplaces: George Washington University 1988–2019 University of California, Santa Cruz 2023-present

Ronald Weitzer (born 1952) is an American sociologist specializing in criminology and a professor at George Washington University, known for his publications on police-minority relations and on the sex industry.

== Research and views ==
=== Prostitution and sex trafficking ===
Weitzer has authored a number of papers on the sex industry, with a focus on laws and policies regarding prostitution and sex trafficking. He published a 1999 article evaluating US policies as well as a 2009 study of prostitution in Western Australia, whose state legislature voted to legalize brothel and escort prostitution in 2008.

In 2012 he published a book on legal prostitution systems, Legalizing Prostitution: From Illicit Vice to Lawful Business. The book is based on Weitzer's review of studies of legal prostitution in various nations (New Zealand, Australia, Mexico, and the US state of Nevada) as well as his own research on Belgium, Germany, and the Netherlands. Weitzer notes that the notion of "legal prostitution" is not monolithic: it varies considerably from place to place. First, nations differ in the kinds of prostitution that they permit. Some allow brothels only, others restrict it to escort services, while others allow only independent operators (i.e., those who are self-employed and have no connection to a third-party manager or business establishment). A few societies, such as New Zealand, permit all types of consensual adult prostitution, but most continue to criminalize street prostitution because it is considered more risky and more of a public nuisance than indoor prostitution. In addition, in places where the trade has been decriminalized, at least some types of participants remain illegal. For example, minors are not allowed to work legally, exploitative pimping and trafficking are outlawed, and some societies prohibit migrants or persons infected with HIV from working legally. So, even where prostitution has been decriminalized and is now government-regulated, some types of participants are excluded from the legal regime.

Second, nations differ in the kinds of regulations imposed on legal actors. Some restrict it to designated parts of the city, while others allow it to be more dispersed. Some mandate regular health examinations to check for STDs. Some require condom use, while others simply encourage it. Some require sex workers to be registered with the authorities, although this is widely opposed by the workers, who fear that this information may become publicly available. Most require business owners (of brothels, escort agencies, saunas) to be licensed, and the authorities conduct periodic site visits to ensure that the regulations are being followed. Where such licensing exists, officials often screen applicants to make sure that they have no criminal record nor connections to organized crime.

Legalizing Prostitution examines a wide variety of regulations that differ from nation to nation. One of Weitzer's objectives is to assess which kinds of regulations are (1) most sensible, (2) most likely to win public support, (3) best suited to reducing risks and harms, and (4) most likely to preserve public order. There is much room for debate here, and each nation that has legalized prostitution has had to grapple with these difficult questions. Weitzer's book advocates about 30 "best practices" that he thinks should be taken into account by any nation considering legalization. The first step, he writes, is that "consensual adult prostitution be officially recognized as work and that participants be accorded the rights and protections available to those involved in other occupations".

The book also evaluates existing legal systems. While no system is problem-free, Weitzer finds that several have registered a good measure of success. New Zealand scores well, as does Queensland, Australia, where a 2004 government assessment concluded that its legal brothels "provide a sustainable model for a healthy, crime-free, and safe legal licensed brothel industry" and are a "state of the art model for the sex industry in Australia." While positive outcomes are by no means automatic or guaranteed, Weitzer finds that legal, well-regulated prostitution can be superior to blanket criminalization.

Blanket decriminalization and government regulation of prostitution is not currently possible in the United States. Given this, Weitzer advocates what he calls a "two-track" policy toward enforcement of prostitution laws. One track involves intensified law enforcement of street prostitution (targeting both street prostitutes and their customers), arguing that street prostitution victimizes host communities and leaves the prostitutes themselves open to victimization. The second track involves what he calls "de facto decriminalization" of indoor prostitution, that is, the non-enforcement by police departments of laws against various forms of indoor prostitution, such as escort services, massage parlors, and brothels, even while such laws stay on the books. Weitzer holds that these kinds of activities typically have little effect on the surrounding community and that enforcing laws against such practices involves time-consuming sting operations that waste police resources. Weitzer argues that this two track approach reflects public preferences regarding the proper focus of law enforcement, is a more efficient use of law enforcement resources, and is guided by the principle of harm reduction.

Indoor prostitution is quite different from street prostitution. Weitzer views street prostitution as a serious social problem. Many streetwalkers are underage or runaways or homeless or economically distressed—selling sex out of desperation and for reasons of survival. They are at high risk of drug abuse and victimization and street prostitution has a negative impact on surrounding communities. The push factors that lead individuals into street prostitution (such as poverty, drug addiction, or being runaways from abusive parents) will not be alleviated if street prostitution is decriminalized. At the same time, it is clear that arrests, fines, and incarceration do little to address the root causes of street prostitution. Weitzer advocates far more local government resources be devoted to helping streetwalkers leave prostitution and to facilitating their reintegration into society—requiring a holistic program of temporary housing, drug treatment, health care, counseling, job training, and other needed services.

Weitzer has been highly critical of the prohibitionist position on prostitution (which seeks to eradicate it entirely) and the conflation of all sex work with sex trafficking. While agreeing that sex trafficking is a real and serious problem, he argues that the scale of it has been greatly exaggerated by ideological organizations such as the Coalition Against Trafficking in Women. He also argues against claims that prostitution universally involves coercion and violence and that legalization would make such problems worse, claiming that research has shown that carefully regulated legal prostitution, in parts of the world where it exists, greatly increases the safety and job satisfaction of sex workers. He also argues against what he views as the demonization of customers in anti-prostitution arguments. He has stated that the exaggeration of the scale of violence and trafficking in the sex industry, the demonization of customers, and the call for a punitive response to such problems by prostitution abolitionists amounts to a moral panic.

He further argues that prostitution abolitionists are largely motivated by ideology, generally radical feminism or Christian right views, and this ideologically driven view taints research and statistics about prostitution and trafficking offered by researchers and groups that advocate this position. He has been particularly critical of the claims of anti-prostitution writers such as Janice Raymond, Donna M. Hughes, and Melissa Farley for such reasons. Weitzer points out that the Bush administration and its congressional allies strongly embraced prostitution abolitionist views as a justification for a much broader crackdown on the sex industry.

Weitzer analyzes these and other issues in a journal article that critically evaluates many of the popular claims about human trafficking. Such claims are often devoid of verifiable data but typically get treated as factual by the mass media, politicians, pundits, and activists—and government policies and expenditures regarding trafficking are often based on these highly dubious claims. As an alternative, Weitzer advocates that policies and legislation be based strictly on solid evidence.

=== Police-minority relations ===
Weitzer has done research on police-minority relations in Israel, Northern Ireland, South Africa, and the United States, including studies of racial profiling and police misconduct and racially biased policing. His research has used multiple research methods including quantitative surveys of the public, in-depth interviews, archival research, and systematic observations of police-citizen interactions at "community policing" meetings. He conducted in-depth interviews and observations of police-citizen interactions in a major study of three neighborhoods in Washington, DC—funded by the National Science Foundation. Each neighborhood was either racially or economically distinct—a black middle-class community, white middle-class community, and an impoverished black community. Major differences were found between the three neighborhoods in their perceptions of the DC police and the kinds of interactions and experiences neighborhood residents had with police officers. Prior to this study, Weitzer conducted major research on police-community relations in Northern Ireland, comparing four types of Catholic and Protestant neighborhoods and the impact of policing on each. The study resulted in his 1995 book, Policing Under Fire: Ethnic Conflict and Police-Community Relations in Northern Ireland. Weitzer has also analyzed survey data on Arabs and Jews opinions of the Israel Police. In 2006, he co-authored a book on Americans' views and personal experiences with the police, entitled Race and Policing in America: Conflict and Reform. This research project was followed by several studies of African Americans and the police in St Louis and East St Louis, published in Urban Affairs Review, Sociological Quarterly, and Journal of Contemporary Ethnography.

In addition, Weitzer has examined the effects of highly publicized incidents of police misconduct (such as brutality and corruption) on the public's opinion of the police in New York City and Los Angeles. This study found that public confidence in the police eroded dramatically after each incident that was given intensive media coverage. Although satisfaction with the police gradually rebounded years after the incident, this process took longer for African Americans and Hispanics than for white residents of the two cities.

Weitzer's earliest research focused on Zimbabwe, where he conducted field research in the early 1980s. At that time, he documented the trend toward a de facto one-party state headed by President Robert Mugabe, whose ruling party relied on repressive security measures and institutions to cripple the political opposition. Mugabe's ruling party (ZANU-PF) used laws inherited from its predecessor—the white-minority regime, which collapsed in 1980 and gave way to majority rule. The pattern of de facto one-party rule and repression of political opposition has continued for 30 years, up to the present time. Weitzer's research was published in a groundbreaking 1984 article titled "In Search of Regime Security: Zimbabwe since Independence" in the Journal of Modern African Studies and in his book, Transforming Settler States: Communal Conflict and Internal Security in Northern Ireland and Zimbabwe (published by University of California Press, 1990). This early research set the stage for his subsequent investigation of counterinsurgency policing and ethnic conflict in Northern Ireland and his many studies of police relations with minority groups in the United States.

== Selected bibliography ==
=== Books ===
- Weitzer, Ronald (1990). Transforming settler states: communal conflict and internal security in Northern Ireland and Zimbabwe. Berkeley: University of California Press. ISBN 9780520064904.
- Weitzer, Ronald (1995). Policing under fire: ethnic conflict and police-community relations in Northern Ireland. Albany: State University of New York Press. ISBN 9780791422489.
- Weitzer, Ronald (2000). Sex for sale: prostitution, pornography, and the sex industry (1st ed.). New York: Routledge. ISBN 9780415922951. Published in Japan by Studio Pan, 2004.

Second edition: Weitzer, Ronald (2010). Sex for sale: prostitution, pornography, and the sex industry (2nd ed.). New York: Routledge. ISBN 9780415996051. (Chapters examine street prostitution, escorts, strip clubs, gay and lesbian pornography, telephone sexwork, customers of prostitutes, sex tourism, sex trafficking, and legal prostitution.)

- Weitzer, Ronald; Tuch, Steven A. (2006). Race and policing in America: conflict and reform. New York: Cambridge University Press. ISBN 9780521616911.
- Weitzer, Ronald (2012). Legalizing Prostitution: From Illicit Vice to Lawful Business. New York: New York University Press. ISBN 9780814794630.
- Weitzer Ronald, (2023). Sex Tourism in Thailand: Inside Asia's Premier Erotic Playground, New York University Press New York, 2023. Winner of Outstanding Book Award, Honorable Mention, American Society of Criminology, Division of International Criminology 2024
- Weitzer, Ronald, (2023). Sex for Sale: Prostitution, Pornography, and Erotic Dancing. 3rd edn, 2023. Routledge Press.

=== Chapters in books ===
- Weitzer, Ronald (2010), "Race and policing in different ecological contexts", in Rice, Stephen; White, Michael (eds.), Race, Ethnicity, and Policing: New and Essential Readings, New York: New York University Press, pp. 118–139, ISBN 9780814776162
- Weitzer Ronald (2023). "Sex Work: Types and Paradigms," in R. Weitzer (ed) Sex For Sale (3rd edn) New York: Routledge, 2023
- Weitzer Ronald (2023). "Criminalization, Decriminalization, and Legalization," in R. Weitzer (ed) Sex For Sale (3rd edn) New York: Routledge, 2023

=== Journal articles ===
- Weitzer, Ronald "Theorizing Sex Work: A Sectoral Approach" Theory and Society, v. 53, 2024
- Weitzer, Ronald “Interaction Rituals and Sexual Commerce in Thailand’s Erotic Bars,” Journal of Contemporary Ethnography, v. 50 (2021): 622-648
- Weitzer, Ronald (March 1991). "Prostitutes rights in the United States: the failure of a movement". The Sociological Quarterly. 32 (1): 23–41. doi:10.1111/j.1533-8525.1991.tb00343.x.
- Weitzer, Ronald (September 1999). "Prostitution control in America: rethinking public policy". Crime, Law and Social Change. 32 (1): 83–102. doi:10.1023/A:1008305200324. S2CID 153101586.
- Weitzer, Ronald (1999). "Citizens' perceptions of police misconduct: race and neighborhood context". Justice Quarterly. 16 (4): 819–846. doi:10.1080/07418829900094381.
- Weitzer, Ronald (2000). "Racialized policing: residents' perceptions in three neighborhoods". Law & Society Review. 34 (1): 129–155. doi:10.2307/3115118. JSTOR 3115118.
- Weitzer, Ronald (July–August 2000). "White, black, or blue cops? Race and citizen assessments of police officers". Journal of Criminal Justice. 28 (4): 313–324. doi:10.1016/S0047-2352(00)00043-X.
- Weitzer, Ronald; Tuch, Steven A. (May 2002). "Perceptions of racial profiling: race, class, and personal experience". Criminology. 40 (2): 435–456. doi:10.1111/j.1745-9125.2002.tb00962.x.
- Weitzer, Ronald (September–October 2002). "Incidents of police misconduct and public opinion". Journal of Criminal Justice. 30 (5): 397–408. doi:10.1016/S0047-2352(02)00150-2.
- Weitzer, Ronald (May 2003). "Retaliatory homicide: concentrated disadvantage and neighborhood culture". Social Problems. 50 (2): 157–180. doi:10.1525/sp.2003.50.2.157. S2CID 42230590.
- Weitzer, Ronald; Kubrin, Charis E. (December 2003). "New directions in social disorganization theory". Journal of Research in Crime and Delinquency. 40 (4): 374–402. doi:10.1177/0022427803256238. S2CID 15496504.
- Weitzer, Ronald; Tuch, Steven A. (May 2004). "Reforming the police: racial differences in public support for change". Criminology. 42 (2): 391–416. doi:10.1111/j.1745-9125.2004.tb00524.x.
- Weitzer, Ronald (July 2005). "Flawed theory and method in studies of prostitution". Violence Against Women. 11 (7): 934–949. doi:10.1177/1077801205276986. PMID 16043578. S2CID 29745148.
- Weitzer, Ronald (August 2005). "Can the police be reformed?". Contexts. 4 (3): 21–26. doi:10.1525/ctx.2005.4.3.21. S2CID 62229920.
- Weitzer, Ronald (September–October 2005). "The growing moral panic over prostitution and sex trafficking". The Criminologist. 30 (5). American Society of Criminology: 1, 3–5. Archived from the original on 2016-03-04. Pdf.
- Weitzer, Ronald; Hasisi, Badi (September 2007). "Police relations with Arabs and Jews in Israel". The British Journal of Criminology. 47 (5): 728–745. doi:10.1093/bjc/azm027.
- Weitzer, Ronald (September 2007). "The social construction of sex trafficking: ideology and institutionalization of a moral crusade". Politics & Society. 35 (3): 447–475. doi:10.1177/0032329207304319. S2CID 154583133. Pdf.
- Weitzer, Ronald (November 2007). "Prostitution: facts and fictions". Contexts. 6 (4): 28–33. doi:10.1525/ctx.2007.6.4.28.
- Weitzer, Ronald; Tuch, Steven A.; Skogan, Wesley G. (November 2008). "Police-community relations in a majority-black city". Journal of Research in Crime and Delinquency. 45 (4): 398–428. doi:10.1177/0022427808322617. S2CID 15291755.
- Weitzer, Ronald; Brunson, Rod K. (Spring 2009). "Strategic responses to the police among inner-city youth". The Sociological Quarterly. 50 (2): 235–256. doi:10.1111/j.1533-8525.2009.01139.x. S2CID 143963929.
- Weitzer, Ronald; Brunson, Rod K. (July 2009). "Police relations with black and white youths in different urban neighborhoods". Urban Affairs Review. 44 (6): 858–885. doi:10.1177/1078087408326973. S2CID 154232554.
- Weitzer, Ronald (2009). "Sociology of sex work". Annual Review of Sociology. 35 (1): 213–234. doi:10.1146/annurev-soc-070308-120025. S2CID 145372267.
- Weitzer, Ronald; Kubrin, Charis E. (October 2009). "Misogyny in rap music: a content analysis of prevalence and meanings". Men and Masculinities. 12 (1): 3–29. doi:10.1177/1097184X08327696. S2CID 145060286. Pdf.
- Weitzer, Ronald (March 2010). "The movement to criminalize sex work in the United States". Journal of Law and Society. 37 (1): 61–84. doi:10.1111/j.1467-6478.2010.00495.x. S2CID 145288188.
- Weitzer, Ronald (March 2010). "The mythology of prostitution: advocacy research and public policy". Sexuality Research and Social Policy. 7 (1): 15–29. doi:10.1007/s13178-010-0002-5. S2CID 144735092.
- Weitzer, Ronald (May 2011). "Pornography's effects: the need for solid evidence: A review essay of "Everyday pornography", edited by Karen Boyle (New York: Routledge, 2010) and "Pornland: how porn has hijacked our sexuality", by Gail Dines (Boston: Beacon, 2010)". Violence Against Women. 17 (5): 666–675. doi:10.1177/1077801211407478. PMID 21511821. S2CID 220342944.

See also: Boyle, Karen (April 2012). "The myth of objectivity: a reply to Weitzer" (PDF). Violence Against Women. 18 (4): 506–511. doi:10.1177/1077801212452547. PMID 22865619. S2CID 206667778.
and: Dines, Gail (April 2012). "A feminist response to Weitzer". Violence Against Women. 18 (4): 512–520. doi:10.1177/1077801212452550. PMID 22865620. S2CID 1122327.

- Weitzer, Ronald; Brunson, Rod K. (August 2011). "Negotiating unwelcome police encounters: the intergenerational transmission of conduct norms". Journal of Contemporary Ethnography. 40 (4): 425–456. doi:10.1177/0891241611409038. S2CID 145200806.
- Weitzer, Ronald (Fall 2011). "Sex trafficking and the sex industry: the need for evidence-based theory and legislation". Journal of Criminal Law & Criminology. 101 (4). Northwestern University School of Law: 1337–1370. Pdf.
- Weitzer, Ronald (September 2014). "The social ecology of red-light districts: a comparison of Antwerp and Brussels". Urban Affairs Review. 50 (5): 702–730. doi:10.1177/1078087413504081. S2CID 145111207.
- Weitzer, Ronald (September 2014). "The puzzling neglect of Hispanic Americans in research on police–citizen relations". Ethnic and Racial Studies. 37 (11): 1995–2013. doi:10.1080/01419870.2013.790984. S2CID 3087787.
- Weitzer, Ronald (June 2015). "Researching prostitution and sex trafficking comparatively". Sexuality Research and Social Policy. 12 (2): 81–91. doi:10.1007/s13178-014-0168-3. S2CID 14338143.
- Weitzer, Ronald (August 2015). "Human Trafficking and Contemporary Slavery". Annual Review of Sociology. 41: 223–242. doi:10.1146/annurev-soc-073014-112506. S2CID 145162813.
- Weitzer, Ronald; Boels, Dominique (September 2015). "Ghent's red-light district in comparative perspective". Sexuality Research and Social Policy. 12 (3): 248–260. doi:10.1007/s13178-015-0181-1. S2CID 17428658.

=== Press ===
- Weitzer, Ronald (September 26, 2004). "Why prostitution initiative misses / Measure Q in Berkeley fails on 3 counts". San Francisco Chronicle. Hearst Corporation.
- Weitzer, Ronald (February 9, 2006). "Prostitution panic: the growing hysteria over sex trafficking". American Sexuality. National Sexuality Resource Center, San Francisco State University. Archived from the original on 16 May 2008.

=== Other writings by Ronald Weitzer ===
- "Why Prostitution Should Be Legal," CNN.com (GPS/Global Public Square), April 23, 2012 http://globalpublicsquare.blogs.cnn.com/2012/04/23/why-prostitution-should-be-legal/
- "Sex Markets," Reason magazine,(February 2012), p. 12.
- "Myths About Human Trafficking," The Huffington Post, August 24, 2011 http://www.huffingtonpost.com/ronald-weitzer/human-trafficking-myths_b_935366.html
- "Race and perceptions of police misconduct", Social Problems 51: 305–325, August 2004.
- "Breaking news: How local TV news and real-world conditions affect fear of crime", Justice Quarterly 21(3): 497–520, September 2004.
- "Public opinion on reforms in policing", The Police Chief 71(12), December 2004.
- "New directions in research on prostitution", Crime, Law and Social Change, 43(4/5): 211–235, June 2005.
- "Alternatives to secure detention and confinement of juvenile offenders", OJJDP Juvenile Justice Practices Series, Juvenile Justice Bulletin, September 2005.
- Weitzer, Ronald (2007). "Prostitution as a Form of Work". Sociology Compass. 1 (1): 143–155. doi:10.1111/j.1751-9020.2007.00010.x. ISSN 1751-9020.
- "Police-Community Relations in a Majority-Black City", Journal of Research in Crime and Delinquency 45:398–428, November 2008.
- "Legalizing Prostitution: Morality Politics in Western Australia", British Journal of Criminology 49:88–105, January 2009. (PDF.)
