= Rebecca Whisnant =

Academic at the University of Dayton

Rebecca S. Whisnant
- Born: Rebecca Suzanne Whisnant

Academic background
- Education: UNC-Chapel Hill
- Thesis: Centering oneself: normative independence and the moral life (2002)

Academic work
- Institutions: University of Dayton
- Main interests: Ethical theory, feminist social theory, sexual exploitation
- Website: University of Dayton profile

Rebecca Suzanne Whisnant is an American professor and chair of the philosophy department at the University of Dayton.

== Biography ==
Whisnant gained her degree in philosophy from Oberlin College in 1989. She went on to complete a masters (1992), and a Ph.D. (2002), both in philosophy, at University of North Carolina at Chapel Hill.

Prior to working at the University of Dayton, Whisnant taught at the University of Southern Indiana.

== Bibliography ==
=== Books ===
- Whisnant, Rebecca (1992). An access relations theory of personal identity (M.A. thesis). University of North Carolina at Chapel Hill. OCLC 29334818.
- Whisnant, Rebecca (2002). Centering oneself: normative independence and the moral life (Ph.D. thesis). University of North Carolina at Chapel Hill. OCLC 51249722.
- Whisnant, Rebecca; Stark, Christine (2004). Not for sale: feminists resisting prostitution and pornography. North Melbourne, Victoria: Spinifex Press. ISBN 9781876756499. Quote from book: "One of the key points we wanted to get across in the book is that pornography is prostitution."

Book review: Newland, Laura (July–August 2005). "Review: Not For Sale: Feminists Resisting Prostitution and Pornography". Off Our Backs. 35 (7/8). off our backs, inc.: 21. JSTOR 20838416.

- Whisnant, Rebecca; DesAutels, Peggy (2008). Global feminist ethics. Lanham, Maryland: Rowman & Littlefield. ISBN 9780742559103.

=== Chapters in books ===
- Whisnant, Rebecca (2004), "Woman centered: a feminist ethic of responsibility", in Walker, Margaret Urban; DesAutels, Peggy (eds.), Moral psychology: feminist ethics and social theory, Feminist Constructions, Lanham, Maryland: Rowman & Littlefield Publishers, pp. 201–218, ISBN 9780742534803.
- Whisnant, Rebecca; Dines, Gail; Thompson, Linda (2010), "Arresting images: anti-pornography slide shows, activism and the academy", in Boyle, Karen (ed.), Everyday pornography, London New York: Routledge, pp. 17–33, ISBN 9780415543781. (With Karen Boyle.)
- Whisnant, Rebecca (2010), "From Jekyll to Hyde: the grooming of male pornography consumers", in Boyle, Karen (ed.), Everyday pornography, London New York: Routledge, pp. 114–133, ISBN 9780415543781.
- Whisnant, Rebecca (2015), "Not your father's Playboy, not your mother's feminist movement: feminism in porn", in Kiraly, Miranda; Tyler, Meagan (eds.), Freedom fallacy: the limits of liberal feminism, Ballarat, Victoria: Connor Court Publishing, ISBN 9781925138542.
- Whisnant, Rebecca (2015), "Building feminism, resisting porn culture: where to from here?", in Kiraly, Miranda; Tyler, Meagan (eds.), Freedom fallacy: the limits of liberal feminism, Ballarat, Victoria: Connor Court Publishing, ISBN 9781925138542.

=== Journal articles ===
- Whisnant, Rebecca (2005). "Rethinking nonviolence: intimate abuse and the needs of survivors". Social Philosophy Today. 21. Philosophy Documentation Center: 225–236. doi:10.5840/socphiltoday2005213.
- Whisnant, Rebecca; Mantilla, Karla (2007). "Pornography and pop culture: Backlash and a feminism that is contrary to feminism". Off Our Backs. 37 (7/8). off our backs, inc.: 58–61. JSTOR 20838776.
- Whisnant, Rebecca (April–June 2016). ""But what about feminist porn?": examining the work of Tristan Taormino". Sexualization, Media, and Society. 2 (2). SAGE. doi:10.1177/2374623816631727. Pdf.
- Whisnant, Rebecca (July–September 2016). "Pornography, humiliation, and consent". Sexualization, Media, and Society. 2 (3). SAGE: 237462381666287. doi:10.1177/2374623816662876. Pdf.
- Whisnant, Rebecca (September 2016). "Our Blood: Andrea Dworkin on Race, Privilege, and Women's Common Condition". Women's Studies International Forum. 58: 68–76. doi:10.1016/j.wsif.2016.07.004 – via Research Gate.

Book review

- Whisnant, Rebecca (August 2007). "Book review: Trafficking and Prostitution Reconsidered: New Perspectives on Migration, Sex Work, and Human Rights by Kamala Kempadoo, Jyoti Sanghera, Bandana Pattanaik". Hypatia: A Journal of Feminist Philosophy. 22 (3). Wiley: 194–222. doi:10.1111/j.1527-2001.2007.tb01097.x. JSTOR 4640092. S2CID 223199853.

Book details: Kempadoo, Kamala (2005). Trafficking and prostitution reconsidered: new perspectives on migration, sex work, and human rights. Boulder, Colorado: Paradigm Publishers. ISBN 9781594510977.

== See also ==
- University of Dayton Discussion: Rebecca Whisnant class Chat with readers of "Why is Beauty On Parade" (archived at Archive.org)
