= Doe Mayer =

American filmmaker, academic, and author

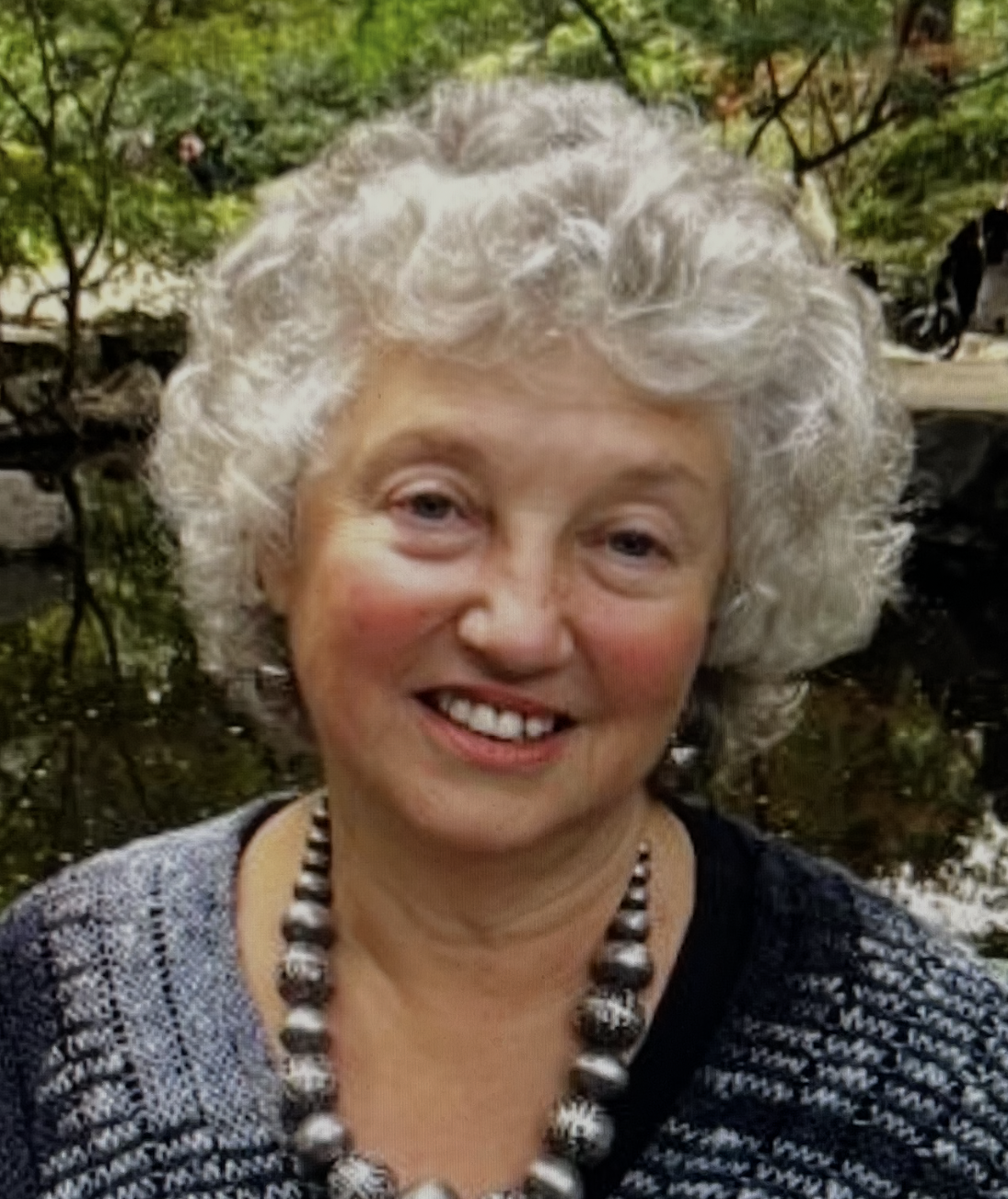
- Occupations: Filmmaker, academic, author, professor emerita at university of Southern California

Academic background
- Education: B.A., Liberal Arts, New York University, 1968; M.A., Film Production, USC, 1973; Post graduate Directing Fellowship, American Film Institute, 1975

Doe Mayer is an American filmmaker, academic, and author. She is the inaugural holder of the Mary Pickford Chair in Film and Television Production as well as Professor Emerita of Cinematic Arts at the University of Southern California.

She is known for her contributions to the field of entertainment-education and the strategic use of media to address global health, gender equity, and community activism.

== Early life and education ==
Mayer received her film training from New York University, the University of Southern California, and the American Film Institute (AFI). She initially pursued a career in feature films, working as a researcher on large Hollywood productions such as Shampoo (1975) and The China Syndrome (1979). In her early work she often incorporated nonfiction television coverage of political and social news events into feature films, blending media formats in ways that prefigured her later focus on creating socially relevant documentaries.

== Career ==
Mayer shifted her focus toward documentary filmmaking and social issue programming. Her growing interest in gender equity and social justice led her to work on the Equal Rights Amendment campaign in the early 1980s. Between 1982 and 1985, she lived in Zimbabwe, where she produced educational films and trained local filmmakers.

Upon returning to the United States, Mayer joined the faculty at USC in the School of Cinematic Arts. She was the first woman on tenure track in the production division, where she taught beginning, intermediate, and advanced levels of film production, specializing in documentary. She ran the graduate documentary program and introduced courses on creative filmmaking, media and social change, and women in the motion picture industries. In 1993 she was selected as the inaugural Mary Pickford Chair of Film and Television Production and also received a joint appointment in the Annenberg School for Communication and Journalism. Her work there centered on the practical application of communication campaign strategies and designs for social issues and health-defined organizations, and global storytelling.

== Works ==
Mayer has primarily worked in visual media, where she has produced, directed, and provided technical support for productions in the United States as well as in developing countries. She has created campaigns on family planning, basic education, health and nutrition promotion, HIV/AIDS prevention, environmental protection, population issues, and women's rights. Her films have been shown at the Chicago Film Festival, Atlanta Film Festival, the United Nations Decade for Women Festival in Nairobi, Kenya and the New York Film Festival.

Throughout her production career, Mayer has produced and directed films that promote social change. In 1990, she produced Vukani Mukai, Awakening to encourage Zimbabwean women to get training in organizing small-scale income-generating projects. In The Women Will (Wanawake Watatunza), she documented the journey and impact of the Kenya Rural Area Women's Project in empowering and supporting rural Kenyan women through training, cultural exchanges, community workshops, and the development of grassroots projects. In Competent Women, Caring Men: Images that Inspire, she explored how mass media can transform traditional gender roles by portraying strong, capable women and nurturant men, and how it can influence societal behavior through entertainment-based education.

She created a documentary on women learning to use computers in a tsunami-affected region of the Indian state of Kerala.

Mayer has done extensive work in the Hispanic community of Los Angeles. In 2023, she coauthored "Evaluation of an Audio-Visual Novela to Improve COVID-19 Knowledge and Safe Practices Among Spanish-Speaking Individuals with Schizophrenia", published in the Journal of Immigrant and Minority Health.

In Los Angeles, she produced two videos—The Tamale Lesson and It's Time—which promoted Pap tests and the HPV vaccine, exploring the impact of narrative and fact-based approaches in health communication. She produced three short web video profiles as part of the Immigrant Health Initiative at USC, documenting health issues faced by immigrant families. As co-principal investigator for the La Clave project, a communication outreach campaign directed to the Latino community in Los Angeles, she produced La Clave, aiming to help Latino viewers recognize signs of psychosis in family members and get them prompt assistance.

== Research ==
Mayer has conducted research on the challenges associated with teaching film and video production in developing nations. Her book with Jed Dannenbaum (her late husband) and Carroll Hodge, Creative Filmmaking from the Inside Out focuses on how students can improve their work, generate a story concept, set up lighting on a set, edit a scene, or choose the right music. A study she did with Barbara Pillsbury examined the effectiveness of women's NGOs in addressing sexual and reproductive health problems, the use of media and technology in these efforts, and the importance of collaboration and shared knowledge. She has highlighted the power of culturally specific narrative videos in communicating health programs and beneficial interventions, emphasizing the effectiveness of storytelling rather than providing didactic information.

Across her work, Mayer has consistently underscored the effectiveness of culturally specific narrative media in health communication campaigns, arguing that storytelling rather than didactic, statistics-driven messaging is key to engaging audiences and changing behavior.

== Awards and honors ==
- 1995 – Fulbright Scholar Award, University of the South Pacific
- 1996 – Award for Innovative Achievement in Female Education in Africa, to Malawi Girls Education Project, Forum for African Educationalists
- 2001 – Award for the Advancement of Women's Media Education in California, National Organization for Women
- 2004 – Remarkable Women Award, University of Southern California
- 2007 – Fulbright Senior Specialist Award, Institute for Entertainment Education, Netherlands
- 2009 – Associates Award for Excellence in Teaching, University of Southern California
- 2010 – Fulbright Senior Specialist Award, University of Melbourne
- 2013 – Promotion Award for The Tamale Lesson and It's Time, American Public Health Association
- 2015 – Mellon Mentoring Award, University of Southern California

== Bibliography ==
=== Books ===
- Creative Filmmaking from the Inside Out: Five Keys to the Art of Making Inspired Movies and Television (2003) ISBN 9780743223195

=== Selected articles ===
- Mayer, D. (1993). Problems of teaching film and video production in developing countries: Tales from the field.
- Jonathan Harris, M., & Mayer, D. (1993). Matching the Media and the Message: Making EffectiveCorporate Films and Videos. Journal of Management Development, 12(4), 13–19.
- Pillsbury, B., & Mayer, D. (2005). Women connect! Strengthening communications to meet sexual and reproductive health challenges. Journal of Health Communication, 10(4), 361–371.
- Baezconde-Garbanati, L., Chatterjee, J. S., Frank, L. B., Murphy, S. T., Moran, M. B., Werth, L. N., ... & O'Brien, D. (2014). The Transformative Power of Narrative as a Behavioral Change Communication Tool to Reduce Health Disparities in Cervical Cancer among Latinas: Global Implications.
- Hernandez, M. Y., Mejia, Y., Mayer, D., & Lopez, S. R. (2016). Using a narrative film to increase knowledge and interpersonal communication about psychosis among Latinos. Journal of health communication, 21(12), 1236–1243.
