= Transcultural nursing =

Concept in nursing

Transcultural nursing is how professional nursing interacts with the concept of culture. Based in anthropology and nursing, it is supported by nursing theory, research, and practice. It is a specific cognitive specialty in nursing that focuses on global cultures and comparative cultural caring, health, and nursing phenomena. It was established in 1955 as a formal area of inquiry and practice. It is a body of knowledge that assists in providing culturally appropriate nursing care.

== Description ==
According to Madeleine Leininger, the pioneer of transcultural nursing, it is a substantive area of study and practice that focuses on the comparative cultural values of caring, the beliefs and practices of individuals or groups of similar or different cultures. According to MEDLINE, transcultural nursing is an area of expertise in nursing that responds to the need for developing global perspective within nursing practice in a world of interdependent nations and people. As a discipline, it centers on combining international and transcultural content into the training of nurses. It includes learning cultural differences, nursing in other countries, international health issues, and international health organizations.

== Goals ==
The goal of transcultural nursing is to give culturally congruent nursing care, and to provide culture specific and universal nursing care practices for the health and well-being of people or to aid them in facing adverse human conditions, illness or death in culturally meaningful ways.

== Founder ==
As the initiator of and the leader in the field of transcultural nursing, Madeleine Leininger was the first professional nurse who finished a doctorate degree in anthropology. Leininger first taught a transcultural nursing course at the University of Colorado in 1966. In 1998, Leininger was honored as a Living Legend of the American Academy of Nursing. Leininger was the editor of the Journal of Transcultural Nursing, the official publication of the Transcultural Nursing Society, from 1989 to 1995. She authored books about the field of transcultural nursing.

== History ==
Through Leininger, transcultural nursing started as a theory of diversity and universality of cultural care. Transcultural nursing was established from 1955 to 1975. In 1975, Leininger refined the specialty through the use of the "sunrise model" concept. It was further expanded from 1975 to 1983. Its international establishment as a field in nursing continued from 1983 to the present. After being formalized as a nursing course in 1966 at the University of Colorado, transcultural nursing programs and track programs were offered as masters and doctoral preparations during the early parts of the 1970s.

== Transcultural nurses ==
Nurses who practice the discipline of transcultural nursing are called transcultural nurses. Transcultural nurses, in general, are nurses who act as specialists, generalists, and consultants in order to study the interrelationships of culturally constituted care from a nursing point of view. They are nurses who provide knowledgeable, competent, and safe care to people of diverse cultures to themselves and others.

== Certification ==
Certification as a transcultural nurse is offered under a graduate study or track programs by the Transcultural Nursing Society since 1988.

== Transcultural Nursing Society ==
The Transcultural Nursing Society is the official organization of transcultural nurses. Chartered in 1974, the society is the publisher of the Journal of Transcultral Nursing, a publication that had been in existence since 1989.

== Publications ==
Apart from the Journal of Transcultural Nursing, other publications related to transcultural nursing include the Journal of Cultural Diversity (since 1994), and the Journal of Multicultural Nursing (since 1994, currently published as the Journal of Multicultural Nursing and Health: Official Journal of the Center for the Study of Multiculturalism and Health Care).

== See also ==
- Nursing credentials and certifications
- Transcultural psychiatry
- Men in nursing
