= Madeleine Leininger =

American nursing theorist (1925–2012)

- Born: July 13, 1925; Sutton, Nebraska, U.S
- Died: August 10, 2012 (aged 87); Omaha, Nebraska, U.S
- Occupations: Nurse, former CEO of the American Nurses Association

Madeleine Leininger (July 13, 1925 – August 10, 2012) was an American nursing theorist, nursing professor and developer of the concept of transcultural nursing. First published in 1961, her contributions to nursing theory involve the discussion of what it is to care.

== Biography ==
Leininger was born on 13 July 1925. She earned a nursing diploma from St. Anthony's Hospital School of Nursing, followed by undergraduate degrees at Benedictine College and Creighton University. She received a Master of Science in Nursing at Catholic University of America. She later studied cultural and social anthropology at the University of Washington, earning a PhD in 1966. Leininger held at least three honorary doctoral degrees.

Dr. Leininger held faculty positions at the University of Cincinnati and the University of Colorado, followed by service as a nursing school dean at both the University of Washington and the University of Utah. She was Professor Emeritus of Nursing at Wayne State University and an adjunct faculty member at the University of Nebraska Medical Center in Omaha. Leininger died at her home in Omaha, Nebraska on August 10, 2012.

=== Honors and awards ===
- 1998: Living Legend, American Academy of Nursing
- 1998: Distinguished Fellow, Royal College of Nursing (Australia)

== Cultural care theory ==
The cultural care theory aims to provide culturally congruent nursing care through "cognitively based assistive, supportive, facilitative, or enabling acts or decisions that are mostly tailor-made to fit with individual's, group's, or institution's cultural values, beliefs, and lifeways" (Leininger, M. M. (1995). Transcultural nursing: Concepts, theories, research & practices. New York: McGraw Hill, Inc.5, p. 75) This care is intended to fit with or have beneficial meaning and health outcomes for people of different or similar cultural backgrounds.

=== Components of culturalogical assessment ===
- communication and language
- gender considerations
- sexual orientation
- ability/disability
- occupation
- age
- socioeconomic status
- interpersonal relationships
- appearance
- dress
- use of space
- foods
- meal preparation and related life ways

Leininger proposes that there are three modes for guiding nursing care judgements, decisions, or actions to provide appropriate, beneficial, and meaningful care:
(a) preservation and/or maintenance
(b) accommodation and/or negotiation
(c) re-patterning and/or restructuring

"These modes have substantively influenced nurses’ ability to provide culturally congruent nursing care and have fostered the development of culturally-competent nurses."

=== Theoretical assumptions and orientational definitions ===
1. Care is the essence of nursing and a distinct, dominant, and unifying focus.

2. Care (caring) is essential for well being, health, healing, growth survival, and to face handicaps or death.

3. Culture care is the broadest holistic means to know, explain, interpret, and predict nursing care phenomena to guide nursing care practices.

4. Nursing is a transcultural, humanistic, and scientific care discipline and profession with the central purpose to serve human beings worldwide.

5. Care (caring) is essential to curing and healing, for there can be no curing without caring.

6. Culture care concepts, meanings, expressions, patterns, processes, and structural forms of care are different (diversity) and similar (towards commonalities or universalities) among all cultures of the world.

7. Every human culture has lay (generic, folk, or indigenous) care knowledge and practices and usually some professional care knowledge and practices which vary transculturally.

8. Cultural care values, beliefs, and practices are influenced by and tend to be embedded in worldview, language, religious (or spiritual), kinship (social), political (or legal), educational, economic, technological, ethnohistorical, and environmental context of a particular culture.

9. Beneficial, healthy, and satisfying culturally based nursing care contributes to the well being of individuals, families, groups, and communities within their environmental context.

10. Culturally congruent or beneficial nursing care can only occur when the individual, group, community, or culture care values, expressions, or patterns are known and used appropriately and in meaningful ways by the nurse with the people.

11. Culture care differences and similarities between professional caregiver(s) and client (generic) care-receiver(s) exist in any human culture worldwide.

12. Clients who experience nursing care that fails to be reasonably congruent with their beliefs, values, and caring lifeways will show signs of cultural conflicts, noncompliance, stresses and ethical or moral concerns.

13. The qualitative paradigm provides new ways of knowing and different ways to discover the epistemic and ontological dimensions of human care transculturally. (Leininger, M. M. (1991). The theory of culture care diversity and universality. New York: National League for Nursing., pp. 44–45)

Leininger focused on two types of knowledge that were present in every culture.

- Emic Knowledge was the folk, lay or generic knowledge that was present in a culture

- Etic Knowledge was the professional or medical knowledge present within the culture and from the outsider perspective

These two types of knowledge intertwined to determine how culture was viewed within the indigenous society and how outside providers would react to it. It was imperative to Leininger that nurses understand specifically the Emic knowledge to have a better understanding of what could be done to tailor nursing care to be more culturally appropriate.

"Leininger defined nursing as a learned scientific and humanistic profession and discipline focused on human care phenomena and caring activities in order to assist, support, facilitate or enable individuals or groups to maintain or regain their health or well-being in culturally meaningful and beneficial ways, or to help individuals face handicaps or death." (Leininger, M. M., & McFarland, M. R. (2002). Transcultural nursing:Concepts, theories, research & practice. New York: McGraw Hill., p. 46)

Leininger provides a visual aid to her theory with the Sunrise Model.

== Transcultural Nursing ==
While Leininger initially started with the creation of the cultural care theory she would later build the theory into a nursing specialty called Transcultural Nursing. In Leininger's own words Transcultural nursing is:

"a substantive area of study and practice focused on comparative cultural care (caring) values, beliefs and practices of individuals or groups of similar or different cultures. Transcultural nursing's goal is to provide culture specific and universal nursing care practices for the health and well-being of people or to help them face unfavorable human conditions, illness or death in culturally meaningful ways."

Combining her nursing experience with the doctorate in Anthropology she had received, Leininger wanted to have nursing look at patients with a cultural perspective, utilizing the indigenous perspective from the patient's own culture and how the outside world would perceive them.

== See also ==
- List of Living Legends of the American Academy of Nursing
