= Journal of Latinx Psychology =

- Language: English
- Edited by: Esteban Cardemil

Publication details
- Former name: Journal of Latina/o Psychology
- History: 2012-present
- Publisher: American Psychological Association (USA)
- Frequency: Quarterly
- Impact factor: 1.048 (2020)

Standard abbreviations
- ISO 4: J. Lat. Psychol.

Indexing
- ISSN: 2168-1678 (print); 2163-0070 (web)

Links
- Journal homepage; Online access

The Journal of Latinx Psychology, formerly the Journal of Latina/o Psychology, is a peer-reviewed academic journal published by the American Psychological Association on behalf of The National Latinx Psychological Association. The journal was established in 2012 and includes articles on "research, practice, advocacy, education, and policy relevant to Latino communities." The previous editor-in-chief was Azara Santiago-Rivera of The Chicago School of Professional Psychology. The current editor is Esteban Cardemil of Clark University.

== Abstracting and indexing ==
The journal is abstracted and indexed by PsycINFO and the Social Sciences Citation Index. According to the Journal Citation Reports, the journal has a 2020 impact factor of 1.048.
