= Susan Bradley =

Canadian psychiatrist

Susan Jane Bradley
- Born: 1940 (age 85–86); Niagara Falls, Ontario, Canada
- Education: University of Toronto
- Scientific career
- Workplaces: University of Toronto

Susan Jane Bradley (born 1940) is a Canadian psychiatrist. She has written many journal articles and books, including Gender Identity Disorder and Psychosexual Problems in Children and Adolescents (with Kenneth Zucker) and Affect Regulation and the Development of Psychopathology. Bradley was chair of the DSM-IV Subcommittee on Gender Disorders.

Bradley served as head of the Division of Child Psychiatry and was psychiatrist-in-chief at the Hospital for Sick Children and was consultant psychiatrist at the Clarke Institute of Psychiatry. She is a professor emerita in the Department of Psychiatry at University of Toronto and a fellow of the Royal College of Physicians.

== Personal ==
Bradley was born in Niagara Falls, Ontario. She attended University of Toronto, earning a Bachelor of Science in 1962 and a Doctor of Medicine in 1966. Prior to starting medical school, she worked for a year in India with CUSO.

== Career ==
Bradley was certified in medicine in 1967. She earned her specialty licenses in psychiatry and child psychiatry in 1972. In the late 1970s, Bradley founded the Child and Adolescent Gender Identity Clinic at the Clarke Institute of Psychiatry.

Early models for treating gender-variant children involved attempts to change their gender identity and behavior to conform to social expectations for their assigned gender at birth (AGAB). This approach became best known through the work of Susan Bradley and Kenneth Zucker, and through their colleagues at CAMH in Toronto, where it became known as the "living in your own skin" approach.

In the 1990s, many clinics began to view being transgender as a type of normal human variation. However, Bradley and Zucker continued to believe that preventing children from becoming transgender adults was an appropriate and ethical clinical goal.

In collaboration with her co-author Kenneth Zucker, Bradley saw over 400 cases of children and adolescents with gender dysphoria and related issues. Bradley served the American Psychiatric Association DSM-IV Subcommittee on Gender Identity Disorders.

In 2015, Bradley argued that gender dysphoria in children is sometimes rooted in serious family problems, underlying anxiety disorders or psychological trauma and might need other treatment than change of gender.

== Selected publications ==
According to the Web of Science Bradley has published over 50 articles in peer-reviewed journals. These articles and her books have been cited over 700 times, giving her an h-index of 16

- Gender identity disorder and psychosexual problems in children and adolescents, 1996, Guilford Press, ISBN 978-0-89862-266-9, with Kenneth J. Zucker
- Affect regulation and the development of psychopathology, 2003, Guilford Press ISBN 1-57230-939-3
- "Physical Attractiveness of Girls with Gender Identity Disorder". 1996, The International Academy of Sex Research, Archives of Sexual Behavior, Vol. 25, No. 1
