= Karen Boyle =

British researcher

- Born: Karen Elizabeth Boyle; 22 October 1971 (age 54)

Academic work
- Institutions: University of Strathclyde
- Main interests: Feminism, violence and pornography
- Website: University of Strathclyde

Karen Elizabeth Boyle (born 22 October 1971), is Professor of Feminist Media Studies at the University of Strathclyde, previously she was professor of Feminist Studies at the University of Stirling, and before that was a lecturer in film and television studies at the University of Glasgow. She has published a number of articles on feminism, violence and pornography.

Boyle sits on the editorial boards of both Feminist Media Studies, and Sexualization, Media, and Society.

== Bibliography ==
=== Books ===
- Boyle, Karen (2005). Media and violence gendering the debates. London Thousand Oaks, California: SAGE Publications. ISBN 9781412903790.
- Boyle, Karen (2010). Everyday pornography. London New York: Routledge. ISBN 9780415543781.

=== Chapters in books ===
- Boyle, Karen (2005), "Feminism without men: Feminist media studies in a post-feminist age", in Curran, James; Gurevitch, Michael (eds.), Mass media and society, London New York: Hodder Arnold Distributed in the USA by Oxford University Press, pp. 29–45, ISBN 9780340884997.
- Boyle, Karen; Weissmann, Elke (2007), "Evidence of things unseen: the pornographic aesthetic and the search for truth in CSI", in Allen, Michael (ed.), Reading CSI crime TV under the microscope, London New York: I.B. Tauris, pp. 90–102, ISBN 9781845114282.
- Boyle, Karen (2009), "Gendered narratives of child sexual abuse in fiction film", in Cuklanz, Lisa M.; Moorti, Sujata (eds.), Local violence, global media: feminist analyses of gendered representations, Intersections in Communications and Culture: Global Approaches and Transdisciplinary Perspectives Series, Vol. 23, New York: Peter Lang, pp. 181–200, ISBN 9781433102769.
- Boyle, Karen (2009), "Film, violence and gender", in Stark, Evan D.; Buzawa, Eve S. (eds.), Violence against women in families and relationships: volume 4 The media and cultural attitudes, Santa Barbara, California: Praeger/ABC-CLIO, pp. 37–58, ISBN 9780275998462.
- Boyle, Karen (2010), ""That's so fun": selling pornography for men to women in The Girls Next Door", in Dines, Gail; Humez, Jean M. (eds.), Gender, race and class in media: a critical reader (3rd ed.), California: SAGE, pp. 293–300, ISBN 9781412974417.
- Boyle, Karen (2012), "The dark side of hard core: critical documentaries on the sex industry", in Hines, Claire; Kerr, Darren (eds.), Hard to swallow: hard-core pornography on screen, London New York: Wallflower Press / Columbia University Press, pp. 27–41, ISBN 9780231162135.
- Boyle, Karen (2014), "Feminism and pornography", in Evans, Mary; Hemmings, Clare; Henry, Marsha; Johnstone, Hazel; Madhok, Sumi; Plomien, Ania; Wearing, Sadie (eds.), The SAGE handbook of feminist theory, Thousand Oaks, California: SAGE, pp. 215–231, ISBN 9781446252413.
- Boyle, Karen (2015), "Buying and selling sex: sexualisation, commerce, and gender", in Carter, Cynthia; Steiner, Linda; McLaughlin, Lisa (eds.), The Routledge companion to media & gender, London New York: Routledge, pp. 259–268, ISBN 9781138849129.

=== Journal articles ===
- Boyle, Karen (June 1996). "British feminist archive needs you". Off Our Backs. 26 (6): 21. JSTOR 20835524.
- Boyle, Karen (March–April 2000). "The pornography debates: beyond cause and effect". Women's Studies International Forum. 23 (2): 187–195. doi:10.1016/S0277-5395(00)00077-7.
- Boyle, Karen (November 2001). "What's natural about killing? Gender, copycat violence and Natural Born Killers". Journal of Gender Studies. 10 (3): 311–321. doi:10.1080/09589230120086511. S2CID 145330524.

See also the film: Natural Born Killers.

- Boyle, Karen (Winter 2002 – Spring 2003). "Revisiting the Papin case: gender, sexuality and violence in "Sister My Sister"". South Central Review. 19/20 (1): 103–118. doi:10.2307/3190138. JSTOR 3190138.

See also: Christine and Léa Papin and the film Sister My Sister.

- Boyle, Karen (April 2006). "The boundaries of porn studies" (PDF). New Review of Film and Television Studies. 4 (1): 1–16. doi:10.1080/17400300600577286. S2CID 143013920.

Review of Linda Williams' book, Porn Studies.

- Boyle, Karen (March 2008). "Courting consumers and legitimating exploitation: the representation of commercial sex in television documentaries" (PDF). Feminist Media Studies. 8 (1): 35–50. doi:10.1080/14680770701824894. S2CID 142235679.
- Boyle, Karen (2009). "Book review: Sexy thrills: undressing the erotic thriller by Nina K. Martin". Feminist Review. 92 (92): 170–171. doi:10.1057/fr.2009.9. JSTOR 40664040.
- Boyle, Karen (November 2009). "Attractions and distractions: mums, babies and 'early' cinemagoing". Participations: Journal of Audience & Reception Studies. 6 (2): 260–283. Archived from the original on 5 January 2014. Pdf.
- Boyle, Karen; et al. (March 2010). "Commentary and criticism: representations of sex workers (Selling the selling of sex: Secret Diary of a Call Girl on screen)". Feminist Media Studies. 10 (1): 113–116. doi:10.1080/14680770903457469. S2CID 141294819.
- Boyle, Karen (August 2010). "Watch with baby: cinema, parenting and community" (PDF). European Journal of Cultural Studies. 13 (3): 275–290. doi:10.1177/1367549410363196. S2CID 145748078.
- Boyle, Karen (November–December 2011). "Producing abuse: selling the harms of pornography". Women's Studies International Forum. 34 (6): 593–602. doi:10.1016/j.wsif.2011.09.002.
- Boyle, Karen (April 2012). "The myth of objectivity: a reply to Weitzer" (PDF). Violence Against Women. 18 (4): 506–511. doi:10.1177/1077801212452547. PMID 22865619. S2CID 206667778.

See also: Weitzer, Ronald (May 2011). "Pornography's effects: the need for solid evidence: A review essay of "Everyday pornography", edited by Karen Boyle (New York: Routledge, 2010) and "Pornland: how porn has hijacked our sexuality", by Gail Dines (Boston: Beacon, 2010)". Violence Against Women. 17 (5): 666–675. doi:10.1177/1077801211407478. PMID 21511821. S2CID 220342944.

- Boyle, Karen (May 2014). "Gender, comedy and reviewing culture on the Internet Movie Database". Participations: Journal of Audience & Reception Studies. 11 (1): 31–49. Pdf.
- Boyle, Karen; Berridge, Susan (May 2014). "I love you, man: gendered narratives of friendship in contemporary Hollywood comedies" (PDF). Feminist Media Studies. 14 (3): 353–368. doi:10.1080/14680777.2012.740494. hdl:1893/20600. S2CID 145741364.
- Boyle, Karen; Reburn, Jenny (March 2015). "Portrait of a serial killer: intertextuality and gender in the portrait film" (PDF). Feminist Media Studies. 15 (2): 192–207. doi:10.1080/14680777.2014.946943. S2CID 88510772.
- Boyle, Karen (July 2015). "Introduction: visual pleasure and narrative cinema at forty". Feminist Media Studies. 15 (5): 880–881. doi:10.1080/14680777.2015.1075271. S2CID 147077066.

Article refers to: Mulvey, Laura (Autumn 1975). "Visual Pleasure and Narrative Cinema". Screen. 16 (3): 6–18. doi:10.1093/screen/16.3.6.

=== Other ===
- Boyle, Karen; Ross, Elizabeth A.; Bearse, Miriam L. (1996). "A Chronology of the Women's Liberation Movement in Britain, 1969–79: Table of Contents". feministarchivenorth.org.uk. Bradford: Feminist Archive, North. Archived from the original on 21 June 2007.
- Boyle, Karen; Macleod, Jan (2005). "Getting the message across? Challenging male violence through public education". Glasgow: Women's Support Project. Pdf. (Catalogue of resources.)
- Boyle, Karen (4 June 2015). "How to do things with pornography". Times Higher Education. TES Global.

Book review of: Bauer, Nancy (2015). How to do things with pornography. Cambridge, Massachusetts: Harvard University Press. ISBN 9780674055209.
