= Psychological Services =

- Discipline: Psychology
- Language: English
- Edited by: Patrick DeLeon

Publication details
- History: 2004-present
- Publisher: American Psychological Association (United States)
- Frequency: Quarterly
- Impact factor: 2.659 (2020)

Standard abbreviations
- ISO 4: Psychol. Serv.

Indexing
- ISSN: 1541-1559 (print); 1939-148X (web)
- LCCN: 2002214578
- OCLC no.: 818984260

Links
- Journal homepage; Online access

Psychological Services is a peer-reviewed academic journal published by the American Psychological Association on behalf of APA Division 18. The current editor-in-chief is Patrick DeLeon. The journal was established in 2004 and covers "the broad range of psychological services delivered in organized care settings". These settings include, but are not limited to:

- jails
- courts
- Indian Health Service
- the military
- Department of Veterans Affairs
- university clinics
- training hospitals

== Abstracting and indexing ==
The journal is abstracted and indexed by MEDLINE/PubMed and the Social Sciences Citation Index. According to the Journal Citation Reports, the journal has a 2020 impact factor of 2.659.
