= Journal of Transcultural Nursing =

- Discipline: Transcultural nursing
- Language: English
- Edited by: Mei Rosemary Fu

Publication details
- History: 1989–present
- Publisher: SAGE Publications
- Frequency: Bimonthly
- Impact factor: 1.4 (2024)

Standard abbreviations
- ISO 4: J. Transcult. Nurs.

Indexing
- ISSN: 1043-6596 (print); 1552-7832 (web)
- OCLC no.: 300182946

Links
- Journal homepage; Online access; Online archive

The Journal of Transcultural Nursing is a peer-reviewed nursing journal covering transcultural nursing. The editor-in-chief is Norma Graciela Cuellar. The journal is the official publication of the Transcultural Nursing Society. It was established in 1989 and is published by SAGE Publications. It is a member of Committee on Publication Ethics.

== Abstracting and Indexing ==
The Journal of Transcultural Nursing is abstracted and indexed in Scopus, MEDLINE, the Science Citation Index Expanded, and the Social Sciences Citation Index.

In 2017, the journal ranked 48 out of 114 in Nursing (Social Sciences) and 51 out of 116 in Nursing (Sciences), with an impact factor of 1.262.
