= Journal of Sex & Marital Therapy =

- Discipline: Sexology
- Language: English
- Edited by: R. Taylor Segraves

Publication details
- History: 1975–present
- Publisher: Routledge
- Frequency: 5/year
- Impact factor: 1.935 (2016)

Standard abbreviations
- ISO 4: J. Sex Marital Ther.

Indexing
- ISSN: 0092-623X (print); 1521-0715 (web)

Links
- Journal homepage

The Journal of Sex & Marital Therapy is a peer-reviewed scientific journal published by Routledge and formerly by Brunner/Mazel. Its editor-in-chief is R. Taylor Segraves.

== Scope ==
The Journal of Sex & Marital Therapy covers:

- Sexual dysfunctions—ranging from dyspareunia to pedophilia
- Therapeutic techniques—including psychopharmacology and sexual counseling for a wide range of dysfunctions
- Clinical considerations—sexual dysfunction and its relationship to aging, unemployment, alcoholism, and more
- Theoretical issues—such as the ethics of pornography in the AIDS era
- Marital relationships—including psychological intimacy, and marital stability in women abused as children.
