= Training and Education in Professional Psychology =

- Discipline: Psychology
- Language: English
- Edited by: Michael C. Roberts

Publication details
- History: 2006-present
- Publisher: American Psychological Association (United States)
- Frequency: Quarterly
- Impact factor: 1.563 (2020)

Standard abbreviations
- ISO 4: Train. Educ. Prof. Psychol.

Indexing
- ISSN: 1931-3918 (print); 1931-3926 (web)
- OCLC no.: 237076268

Links
- Journal homepage; Online access

Training and Education in Professional Psychology is a peer-reviewed academic journal published by the American Psychological Association on behalf of the Association of Psychology Postdoctoral and Internship Centers. It was established in 2006 and "is dedicated to enhancing supervision and training provided by psychologists." The current editor-in-chief is Michael C. Roberts of the University of Kansas.

== Abstracting and indexing ==
The journal is abstracted and indexed by the Social Sciences Citation Index. According to the Journal Citation Reports, the journal has a 2020 impact factor of 1.563.
