= Claire M. Renzetti =

American sociologist and criminologist

Claire M. Renzetti (born 1957) is an American sociologist and criminologist. She is the Judi Conway Patton Endowed Chair in the Center for Research on Violence Against Women at the University of Kentucky.

She is a professor in the Department of Sociology and at the Center for Research on Violence Against Women. In 2005/06 she served as President of the Society for the Study of Social Problems.

Renzetti received all her degrees in Sociology from the University of Delaware culminating in Ph.D. in 1982. The title of her dissertation was: Purity vs. Politics: The Legislation of Morality in Progressive New York, 1890-1920.

She was an assistant professor of sociology at Saint Joseph's University from 1981 to 2006 and a professor in the Department of Sociology, Anthropology, & Social Work at the University of Dayton from 2006 to 2010. In 2010 she moved to the University of Kentucky.

== Works include ==
- Researching Sensitive Topics, 1993
- Feminist Criminology, 2013
