= Glen Gabbard =

American psychiatrist (born 1949)

Glen Owens Gabbard (born 1949) is an American psychiatrist known for authoring professional teaching texts for the field. He is Clinical Professor of Psychiatry at Baylor College of Medicine in Houston, Texas, and is also training and supervising analyst at the Center for Psychoanalytic Studies in Houston.

== Education and career ==
His father was Eastern Illinois University Theatre Arts Department Chair E. Glendon Gabbard, and his mother was actress Lucina Paquet Gabbard. Gabbard attended Northwestern University and the University of Texas, and earned his Bachelor's Degree in Theater from Eastern Illinois University. He then earned his M.D. from Rush Medical College in Chicago in 1975. He completed his psychiatry residency at the Karl Menninger School of Psychiatry in Topeka, Kansas. He then served on the staff of the Menninger Clinic for 26 years and served as Director of the Menninger Hospital from 1989 to 1994 and Director of the Topeka Institute for Psychoanalysis from 1996 to 2001. In 2001, he moved to Baylor College of Medicine, where he served as Professor of Psychiatry and Brown Foundation Chair of Psychoanalysis until 2011. From 2011 to the present he has been in full-time private practice and is Clinical Professor of Psychiatry at Baylor College of Medicine in Houston.

Gabbard has authored or edited 29 books and over 360 papers, including books on psychotherapy, psychoanalysis, professional boundary violations, physician health, and media depictions of psychiatry and mental illness in films with his brother Krin. He was Joint Editor-in-Chief of the International Journal of Psychoanalysis and was Associate Editor of the American Journal of Psychiatry. From 2001-2007, he was Joint Editor-in-Chief of the International Journal of Psychoanalysis, the first non-British editor of that journal.

Awards include the Strecker Award for outstanding psychiatrist under age 50 in 1994, the Sigourney Award for Outstanding Contributions to Psychoanalysis in 2000, the American Psychiatric Association Distinguished Service Award in 2002, the American Psychiatric Association Adolf Meyer Award in 2004, and the Rush Medical College Distinguished Alumnus in 2005. In 2010 he received the American Psychiatric Association/National Institute of Mental Health Vestermark Award as outstanding psychiatric educator. He also received the Lifetime Achievement Award from Sapienza University in Rome in 2021.

== Selected publications ==
- Gabbard GO, Wilkinson SM (1994). Management of Countertransference with Borderline Patients. American Psychiatric Press
- Gabbard GO, Gabbard K (1999). Psychiatry and the Cinema. American Psychiatric Publishing ISBN 978-0-88048-964-5
- Gabbard GO (2002). The Psychology of the Sopranos: Love, Death, Desire and Betrayal in America's Favorite Gangster Family. Basic Books ISBN 978-0-465-02735-4
- Gabbard GO, Lester EP (2002). Boundaries and Boundary Violations in Psychoanalysis. New York: Basic Books
- Gabbard GO (2004). Long-Term Psychodynamic Psychotherapy: a Basic Text. Arlington, VA: American Psychiatric Publishing, 2004
- Gabbard GO (2005). Mind, brain, and personality disorders. American Journal of Psychiatry 162(4): 648-655
- Gabbard GO (2005). Psychodynamic Psychiatry in Clinical Practice: Fourth Edition. American Psychiatric Publishing ISBN 978-1-58562-185-9
- Gabbard GO (2007). Gabbard's Treatments of Psychiatric Disorders. American Psychiatric Press. ISBN 978-1-58562-216-0
