= Sexualization, Media, and Society =

- Discipline: Sexualized media (mulitidisciplinary)
- Language: English
- Edited by: Ana Bridges; Deirdre M. Condit; Gail Dines; Jennifer A. Johnson; Carolyn West

Publication details
- History: 2015–present
- Publisher: SAGE Publications (United States)
- Frequency: Continuous

Standard abbreviations
- ISO 4: Sex. Media Soc.

Indexing
- ISSN: 2374-6238 (print); 2374-6238 (web)
- OCLC no.: 890009433

Links
- Journal homepage; Online access; Online archive

Sexualization, Media, and Society (SMS) is a peer-reviewed, interdisciplinary open-access academic journal, published by SAGE, to provide a resource for diverse scholars and activists interested in critically examining the phenomenon of sexualized media as it affects individuals, relationships, communities, and societies.

The journal was founded in 2015 by co-editors Ana Bridges (University of Arkansas), Deirdre M. Condit (Virginia Commonwealth University), Gail Dines (Wheelock College), Jennifer A. Johnson (Virginia Commonwealth University), and Carolyn West (University of Washington Tacoma).
