= Kenneth Zucker =

American-Canadian psychologist/sexologist

Kenneth J. Zucker
- Pronunciation: /ˈzʊkər/
- Born: 1950 (age 75–76)
- Education: University of Toronto, Roosevelt University, & Southern Illinois University
- Scientific career
- Fields: Sexology
- Workplaces: University of Toronto
- Website: www.kenzuckerphd.com

Kenneth J. Zucker (/ˈzʊkər/; born 1950) is an American-Canadian psychologist and sexologist known for the living in your own skin model, a form of conversion therapy targeted towards pre-pubertal children with the goal of making their gender identity reflect their assigned gender at birth and preventing them from growing up transgender.

He was named editor-in-chief of Archives of Sexual Behavior in 2001. In 2007, Zucker was chosen to be a member of the American Psychological Association Task Force on Gender Identity, Gender Variance, and Intersex Conditions, and in 2008 he was named chair of the American Psychiatric Association workgroup on "Sexual and Gender Identity Disorders" for the 2012 edition of the DSM-5. He previously served on workgroups for the DSM-IV and the DSM-IV-TR.

He was psychologist-in-chief at Toronto's Centre for Addiction and Mental Health (CAMH) and head of its Gender Identity Service until December 2015. Citing a review by two adolescent psychiatrists stating that CAMH was out of step with current practices for transgender youth, CAMH fired Zucker and closed the clinic in 2015. They later apologized to Zucker and paid him a financial settlement after one of the complaints in the review was found to be false.

He was previously affiliated with the University of Toronto Faculty of Medicine as a status-only professor in the Department of Psychiatry.

Zucker collaborated with Susan Bradley, collecting clinical and research data over a period of twenty years and became an international authority on gender dysphoria in children (GDC) and adolescents. Zucker's views and therapeutic approach have attracted criticism from several advocates and mental health professionals.

== Life ==
Zucker was born in 1950 to Jewish parents and grew up in Skokie, Illinois. Zucker received his B.A. from Southern Illinois University, his M.A. from Roosevelt University, and his Ph.D. from University of Toronto in 1982. He holds a certification from College of Psychologists of Ontario.

Zucker became interested in gender identity after reading Richard Green's 1974 book Sexual Identity Conflict in Children and Adults. Zucker's graduate work in developmental psychology resulted in his master's thesis on normative gender identity development in children. While in graduate school, Zucker met his future collaborator, Susan Bradley, a child psychiatrist on staff at the Child and Adolescent Service of the Clarke Institute of Psychiatry (now the Child and Family Studies Centre of the Centre for Addiction and Mental Health), a public mental health centre and teaching hospital of the University of Toronto Faculty of Medicine.

Zucker was impressed with the Clarke Institute and met with then chief of psychology, Kingsley Ferguson, who told Zucker of Bradley's new working group assessing children and adolescents with gender identity problems. He joined Bradley's group.

Zucker collaborated with Susan Bradley, collecting clinical and research data over a period of twenty years and became an authority on gender dysphoria in children (GDC) and adolescents.

== Archives of Sexual Behavior ==
Richard Green was the founding editor of the Archives of Sexual Behavior and managed it between 1971 and 2001 before naming Zucker editor.

As editor of Archives of Sexual Behavior, Zucker published a controversial study on conversion therapy by Robert Spitzer. According to The New York Times, after his presentation of the study caused controversy, Spitzer asked Zucker to publish it. Zucker agreed to publish the study in the Archives of Sexual Behavior, on the condition that commentaries on the study were also published. The study was published this way as an alternative to going through the normal academic peer review process. Robert Spitzer later recanted the study's conclusions.

== Living in your own skin model ==
Early models for treating gender-variant children involved attempts to change their gender identity and behavior to conform to social expectations for their assigned gender at birth (AGAB), now considered a form of "conversion therapy" or "reparative therapy". Clinicians such as Richard Green prominently attempted to socially engineer young children assigned male at birth into stereotypically masculine behaviors and away from stereotypically feminine ones with the intent of preventing homosexuality. Zucker adapted Green's methods with the goal of preventing transsexuality.

The approach became best known through the work of Susan Bradley, Zucker, and their colleagues at CAMH in Toronto, where it became known as the "living in your own skin" approach. Zucker has stated that children with gender dysphoria should be treated to eliminate peer ostracism, treating underlying psychopathology, and preventing the child from becoming transgender. Zucker saw preventing children from becoming trans adults as justifiable in part due to the perceived difficulties posed by gender transition.

Zucker's underlying premise was his belief that pre-pubertal youth had malleable gender identities. He argued that preventing children growing up transgender would protect them from social discrimination and the need for gender-affirming care. Echoing early theories on homosexuality that blamed mothers for the gender non-conformity of their children, Zucker argued that the mothers of gender-variant children who are assigned male at birth (AMAB) were overbearing and contributed to gender dysphoria by transferring unresolved trauma to their children. Zucker has argued the belief that socialization played a major role in transition, citing lower number of female-to-male transitions at the time. Zucker has stated he has tried to encourage children to accept their birth sex and supports them in transitioning if they still experience gender dysphoria into adolescence.

In 2003, Zucker and Susan Bradley wrote "In none of our publications have we ever endorsed prevention of homosexuality as a therapeutic goal in the treatment of children with GID, although we note that this might have been a goal of some therapists and also of some parents". In 2006, Zucker stated the prevention of homosexuality and transsexualism were a rationale for treatment for "gender identity disorder of childhood" but stated the former was "problematic". In 2018, Diane Kuhl and Wayne Martino reviewed Zucker and Bradley's 1995 work, Gender Identity Disorder and Psychosexual Problems in Children and Adolescents, and stated that the work endorses the treatment of boys deemed "pre-homosexual" as "both therapeutic and ethical." Kuhl and Martino cite a case history published in this 1995 work as evidence that Zucker and Bradley engaged in conversion therapy practices aimed at preventing homosexuality, and that they referred clinicians to the approaches of Masters and Johnson, and Joseph Nicolosi. In 2020, Zucker stated “there is little evidence that treatment of children with GD alters their eventual sexual orientation“, citing the work of Richard Green. According to Pomara et al., Zucker has stated it "has not been shown that any form of treatment for GID during childhood affects later sexual orientation and from an ethical standpoint… the clinician has an obligation to inform parents about the state of the empiric database".

If parents consented to treatment, Zucker's interventions involved encouraging the same-sex parent to be more active in the child's life and the other parent to step back, introducing same-sex playmates to replace other ones, removing "cross-gender" toys and activities to replace them with more "gender-appropriate" ones, and involving both parents and the child in pyschotherapy.

According to the bioethicist and transgender activist Florence Ashley, a 2015 external review of Zucker's clinic found that the clinic considered being cisgender and heterosexual to be the preferred treatment outcome. The external review recommended that the clinic's methodology should be changed to be more in line with current clinical practices, and recommended a patient-centered, affirmative approach. CAMH later concluded that this report contained various errors and apologized to Zucker.

== DSM-5 and WPATH ==
For several years prior to the publication of the DSM-5, LGBTQ activists strongly opposed Zucker's 2008 appointment to chair the DSM-5 working group on Gender and Sexual Identity Disorders. In May 2008, a petition calling for the removal of Zucker and Ray Blanchard in the working group was circulated and gained over 9,500 signatures. The National LGBTQ Task Force then issued a statement questioning the APA's decision to appoint Zucker and Ray Blanchard to the working group, stating that, "Kenneth Zucker and Ray Blanchard are clearly out of step with the occurring shift in how doctors and other health professionals think about transgender people and gender variance." Between 2008 and 2009, multiple additional commentaries were published questioning his appointment. In April 2008, Zucker was also appointed a member of the APA's task force on gender identity and gender variance.

Zucker was one of the authors of the WPATH 2012 7th edition of its standards of care which called social transition "controversial". In February 2017, Zucker was slated to speak at a panel in Los Angeles for USPATH, the United States branch of WPATH. Protestors picketed the panel arguing that WPATH was grounded in cisnormativity and trans-exclusion. The advocates met with the WPATH board and requested Zucker be removed from the upcoming second panel. The board agreed and removed him with president Jamison Green apologizing for his inclusion. As a result, Zucker was removed from the list of speakers.

== Closure of the CAMH Gender Identity Clinic for Children ==
=== Ontario conversion therapy ban ===
In January 2015, Zucker was the psychologist-in-chief at Toronto's Centre for Addiction and Mental Health (CAMH) and head of its Gender Identity Service. Rainbow Health Ontario submitted a review of academic literature and clinical practices for transgender youth, and expressed concern that the gender identity clinic was not following accepted practices and would be in violation of the upcoming ban on conversion therapy in Ontario. Others linked the Gender Identity Clinic's practices to suicide of transgender youth caused by conversion therapy, and referenced the high-profile case of Leelah Alcorn, a transgender teen from Ohio.

In February 2015, CAMH ordered an external review of its gender identity clinic for children and teens. A report from March 2015 stated that the review was the result of growing online scrutiny of CAMH for alleged conversion therapy practices. The same report stated that the clinic would not be accepting new patients until the review was finished. In March 2015, the Ontario Provincial Parliament introduced the Affirming Sexual Orientation and Gender Identity Act, aimed at banning conversion therapy practices. In June 2015, the legislation was passed unanimously into law by the provincial parliament. The law made LGBT conversion therapy illegal to provide to minors, and removed it from public health insurance coverage for adults. After the bill was passed into law, CAMH stated that they welcomed the unanimous support for the bill.

=== External review ===
The external review was conducted by psychiatrists Suzanne Zinck and Antonio Pignatiello who completed a literature review, reviewed written statements and medical records of former patients, and interviewed staff, community stakeholders, current and former clients and their families. The report found the clinic was "out of step with current clinical and operational practices" and noted concern from stakeholders that staff were being taught Zucker's approach. They characterized Zucker's approach as directive rather than exploratory, found the clinic positioned being "heterosexual and cisgender as the most acceptable treatment outcome", and found that their attempts to "treat" normal human gender variation unlikely to succeed or be ethical. They recommended staff refrain from trying to reduce gender-noncomforming behaviors, avoid pathologizing language, and take a patient-centered affirmative approach. It did not state whether the clinic was engaged in conversion practices but stated that "they cannot state the clinic does not" engage in such practices.

=== Closure ===
In December 2015, CAMH announced that it was "winding down" the clinic and that Zucker was no longer employed there. Kwame McKenzie, medical director of CAMH's child, youth, and family services, said "We want to apologize for the fact that not all of the practices in our childhood gender identity clinic are in step with the latest thinking". CAMH announced a process of consultation with community leaders to examine how best to offer care. McKenzie said that Zucker's treatments were against the centre's guidelines. Prior to the review, stated "that's not what we're supposed to be doing" in response to Zuckers comment in the National Post that the goal of his therapy was to prevent children growing up transgender.

Conservative media figures argued that the closure of the clinic and Zucker's firing were evidence that "trans militants" were censoring scientists. A petition signed by over 500 people, including many known for their anti-trans views and activism, opposing Zucker's firing and arguing it was politically motivated.

=== Settlement ===
After his dismissal, Zucker sued CAMH for defamation and wrongful dismissal. In October 18, CAMH settled with Zucker for $586,000 in damages, legal fees, and interest and released an apology for the report falsely stating he called a patient a "hairy little vermin". CAMH removed the report from its website and apologized, and replaced it with a summary of the report which has not survived a move to its new website.

When the settlement was announced, CAMH stated that it "stands by its decision to close the child and youth gender identity clinic following an external review which concluded the clinic was not meeting the needs of gender-expansive and trans children and their families", adding that "We believe our modernized approach to delivering services to youth better supports diverse patients through best practice and timely care."

== Publications ==
According to the Google Scholar, Zucker has published over 300 articles in peer-reviewed journals. These articles have been cited over 23,000 times, with an h-index of 74. He has published several books, including:

- Gender Identity Disorder and Psychosexual Problems in Children and Adolescents (1995)
- Attachment and Psychopathology (1997)
- Ex-Gay Research: Analyzing the Spitzer Study And Its Relation to Science, Religion, Politics, and Culture (2006)
