= Journal of Immigrant and Minority Health =

- Discipline: Refugee health, health equity
- Language: English
- Edited by: Sana Loue

Publication details
- Former name(s): Journal of Immigrant Health
- History: 1999-present
- Publisher: Springer Science+Business Media
- Frequency: Bimonthly
- Impact factor: 2.015 (2021)

Standard abbreviations
- ISO 4: J. Immigr. Minor. Health

Indexing
- ISSN: 1557-1912 (print); 1557-1920 (web)
- LCCN: 2005215694
- OCLC no.: 61187365

Links
- Journal homepage; Online archive

The Journal of Immigrant and Minority Health is a bimonthly peer-reviewed medical journal covering research on immigrant health and the health of minority groups. It was established in 1999 as the Journal of Immigrant Health, obtaining its current name in 2006. It is published by Springer Science+Business Media and the editor-in-chief is Sana Loue (Case Western Reserve University School of Medicine). According to the Journal Citation Reports, the journal has a 2021 impact factor of 2.015.
