= Martin Kafka =

American psychiatrist (born 1947)

Martin Paul Kafka (born 1947) is an American psychiatrist best known for his work on sex offenders, paraphilias and what he calls "paraphilia-related disorders" such as sex addiction and hypersexuality.

== Career ==
Kafka earned his undergraduate degree at Columbia College of Columbia University in 1968 and his M.D. cum laude in 1973 from the Medical College at SUNY Downstate Medical Center. He completed his psychiatric residency at the University of Michigan Medical Center in 1977.

He was Clinical Instructor of Psychiatry at University Hospital in Ann Arbor, Michigan from 1977 to 1983. He has taught at Harvard Medical School since 1983 and is affiliated with McLean Hospital. In 1999 Kafka was elected a full member of the International Academy of Sex Research. He joined the editorial board of Sexual Abuse: A Journal of Research and Treatment in 1999 and Sexual Addiction & Compulsivity: The Journal of Treatment and Prevention in 2001. Kafka was a charter member of the International Association for the Treatment of Sex Offenders (IATSO) in 2000. He has been president of the Massachusetts Chapter of the Association for the Treatment of Sexual Abusers (MATSA) from 2002 to 2008 and a member of the national ATSA ethics committee from 2004 to 2005. In 2010 he was named a Distinguished Life Fellow of the American Psychiatric Association. In 2008, Kafka was selected to be a member of the American Psychiatric Association's Work Group on Sexual and Gender Identity Disorder for the development of the Diagnostic and Statistical Manual of Mental Disorders Fifth Edition (2013)

Kafka was the only American in a panel of eight non-Catholic scientists commissioned by the church to prepare a report on Catholic sex abuse cases. His article questioned whether "Catholic clerical education and socialization could be associated with an increased risk of expressing or experimenting with socially immature but aberrant sexual behaviors."

Kafka notes that "we don't know" the causes of atypical sexual behaviors. He cautions that "the research is in infancy," but it appears that physiological factors and environmental factors may both play roles. Though sexual abusers of children are more likely to have been child sexual-abuse victims themselves, "most pedophiles have not been sexually abused." Kafka believes "social skills deficits" can be a factor.

Kafka's work on hypersexuality bases an evaluation on total sexual outlet. While previous treatments attempted to reduce androgen levels via chemical castration, Kafka uses drugs that regulate monoamines such as dopamine and norepinephrine, but especially serotonin. He states that "sexual deviance is linked to an as-yet-unidentified disregulation affecting the serotonin system." After treating a sex offender among a group of people diagnosed with eating disorders, Kafka connected the two: "I began to see that the sex offenders were just like the bulimics. Both groups were suffering from a disregulation of appetite."

== Selected publications ==
- Kafka MP (1991). Successful antidepressant treatment of nonparaphilic sexual addictions and paraphilias in men. Clin Psychiatry 1991 Feb;52(2):60-5.
- Kafka MP, Prentky RA (1992). Fluoxetine treatment of nonparaphilic sexual addictions and paraphilias in men. J Clin Psychiatry 1992 Oct;53(10):351-8.
- Kafka MP, Prentky RA (1992). A comparative study of nonparaphilic sexual addictions and paraphilias in men. J Clin Psychiatry 1992 Oct;53(10):345-50.
- Kafka MP, Prentky RA (1994). Sertraline pharmacotherapy for paraphilias and paraphilia-related disorders: an open trial. Ann Clin Psychiatry 1994 Sep;6(3):189-95.
- Kafka MP, Prentky RA (1994). Preliminary observations of DSM-III-R axis I comorbidity in men with paraphilias and paraphilia-related disorders. J Clin Psychiatry 1994 Nov;55(11):481-7.
- Kafka MP (1997). A Monoamine Hypothesis for the Pathophysiology of Paraphilic Disorders. Archives of Sexual Behavior Volume 26, Number 4, August 1997, pp. 343–358(16).
- Kafka MP (1997). Hypersexual desire in males: an operational definition and clinical implications for males with paraphilias and paraphilia-related disorders. Archives of Sexual Behavior 1997 Oct;26(5):505-26.
- Kafka MP, Prentky RA (1998). Attention-deficit/hyperactivity disorder in males with paraphilias and paraphilia-related disorders: a comorbidity study. J Clin Psychiatry. 1998 Jul;59(7):388-96; quiz 397.
- Kafka MP, Hennen J (2002). A DSM-IV Axis I comorbidity study of males (n= 120) with paraphilias and paraphilia-related disorders. Sexual Abuse: A Journal of Research and Treatment. Volume 14, Number 4, October 2002, pp. 349–366(18).

== Notes ==
5. American Psychiatric Association:Diagnostic and Statistical Manual of Mental Disorders, Fifth Edition. Arlington VA, American Psychiatric Association, 2013.
