= Gail Dines =

Anti-pornography campaigner

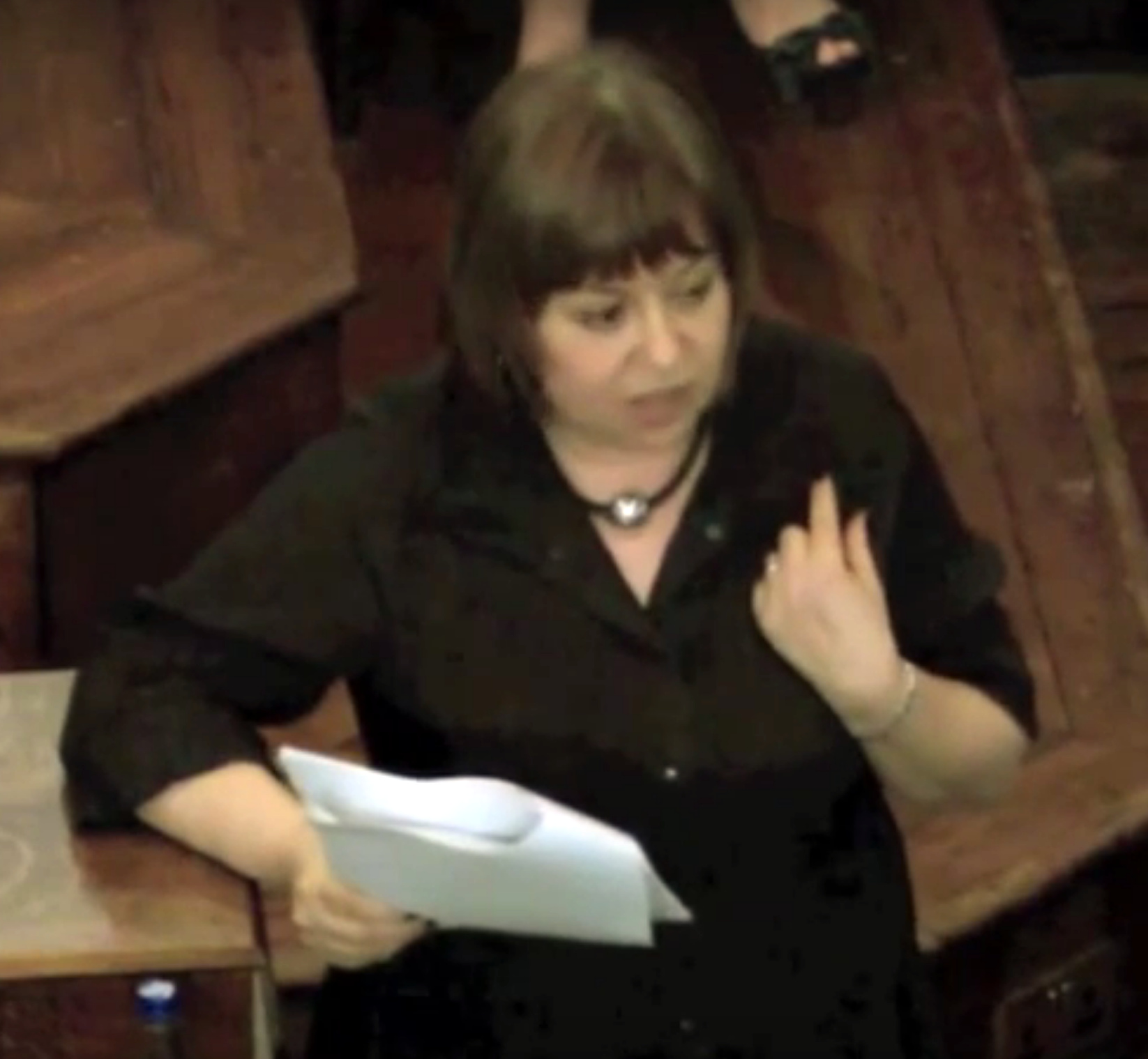
- Dines addressing the Cambridge Union, February 2011
- Born: 29 July 1958 (age 68); Manchester, England
- Occupation: Sociologist
- Known for: Radical feminism; Opposition to pornography
- Title: Professor emerita of sociology and women's studies, Wheelock College, Boston, MA
- Spouse: David Levy
- Children: 1
- Awards: Myers Center Award for the Study of Human Rights in North America

Academic background
- Education: BSc and PhD in sociology, University of Salford
- Thesis: Towards a Sociology of Cartoons: A Framework for Sociological Investigation with Special Reference to Playboy Sex Cartoons (1990)

Academic work
- Notable works: Pornland: How Porn Has Hijacked Our Sexuality (2010)
- Website: gaildines.com

Gail Dines (born 29 July 1958) is a British-born professor emerita of sociology and women's studies at Wheelock College in Boston, Massachusetts.

A radical feminist, Dines specializes in the study of pornography. Described in 2010 as the world's leading anti-pornography campaigner, she is a founding member of Stop Porn Culture and founder of Culture Reframed, created to address pornography as a public-health crisis. Dines is co-author of Pornography: The Production and Consumption of Inequality (1997) and author of Pornland: How Porn Has Hijacked Our Sexuality (2010).

She argues that exposure of teenage girls to the images affects their sense of sexual identity, with the result, Dines writes, that women are "held captive" by images that lie about them, and that femininity is reduced to the "hypersexualized, young, thin, toned, hairless, and, in many cases, surgically enhanced woman with a come-hither look on her face".

== Early life and education ==
Dines was born to an Orthodox Jewish family in Manchester, England, and attended King David School. When she was 18, after reading Robin Morgan's book Sisterhood is Powerful (1970), she abandoned Orthodox Judaism and became a radical feminist, later calling her relationship to feminism "a passionate love affair". She spoke in 2011 about the appeal of radical feminism: "After teaching women for 20-odd years, if I go in and I teach liberal feminism, I get looked [at] blank ... I go in and teach radical feminism, bang, the room explodes. ... I remember what happened to me the first time I read radical feminism. I remember thinking: 'I have been waiting for this my entire life, and I didn't even know I was waiting for it."

She obtained her BSc from Salford University, where she met her husband, David Levy, who was studying at the University of Manchester. She embraced Marxism but became disillusioned with the British left when the students' unions voted to support that Zionism is racism, following United Nations General Assembly Resolution 3379, which meant Jewish student groups were denied funding. Dines believed that the vote led to a climate of increased antisemitism in the UK. She alleged that swastikas were painted on Jewish homes; in a pub with Jewish friends, Dines heard a nearby group say they could "smell gas".

As a result, in 1980 when she was 22, Dines and Levy moved to Israel. While there she co-founded a feminist group, Isha L'isha ("Woman to Woman"), which described itself in 2018 as "the oldest grassroots feminist organization in Israel", and engaged in research at the University of Haifa into violence against women. She started her PhD thesis while volunteering in a rape crisis centre, after encountering pornography during a meeting in Haifa arranged by Women Against Pornography. The following day, she told her thesis advisor she wanted to write her dissertation on pornography: "I literally couldn't believe the images. I couldn't believe that men created such images, and that other men wanted to watch them."

The couple had a son, who was born while Levy was in Lebanon with the Israel Defence Forces, although both he and Dines opposed the war in Lebanon. Dines joined the Israeli peace movement and has continued to be critical of the expansion of Israeli settlements and the treatment of Palestinians in Gaza. Finding it increasingly difficult to live with the hyper-masculinity of Israeli culture, the family moved to the United States in 1986, where Levy began studying at Harvard Business School. Dines obtained her PhD in 1990, again from Salford, for a thesis entitled Towards a Sociology of Cartoons: A Framework for Sociological Investigation with Special Reference to "Playboy" Sex Cartoons.

== Career and research ==
External videos
- TEDx talk by Gail Dines
- "Growing Up in a Pornified Culture", TEDx Talks on YouTube, 28 April 2015

Dines worked at Wheelock College in Boston from 1986 for around 30 years; she became professor of sociology and women's studies there and chair of its American studies department. Levy became professor of management at the University of Massachusetts Boston.

The author of two books, including Pornland: How Porn Has Hijacked our Sexuality (2010), Dines has also written for a variety of journals and newspapers, including The New York Times, Newsweek, Time, and The Guardian. She is a founding member of Stop Porn Culture, co-founder of the National Feminist Anti-Pornography Movement, and founder of Culture Reframed, which aims to have pornography recognized as a public health crisis.

Dines's view of pornography is that it distorts men's view of sexuality, and makes it more difficult for them to establish intimate relationships with women. The violence and cruelty found in modern pornography is unlike earlier forms of soft-core pornography with which the general public may be familiar, Dines writes, and it degrades the position of women in society. She also views the prevalence of hardcore pornography as a contributing factor in increasing "demand" for sex trafficking.

Dines speaking at the Cambridge Union, 2 February 2011, from 00:11:57.

In February 2011, Dines was invited, with fellow anti-pornography activist Shelley Lubben, to debate Anna Span, a pornographic film director, at the Cambridge Union, when it proposed the motion: "This house believes that pornography does a good public service." Dines did not sway the house, which decided 231 in favour to 187 against, with 197 abstentions. Dines said her opponents won because the chamber consisted mostly of "18–22 year old males who are using pornography on a regular basis".

Dines expressed opposition to the academic journal Porn Studies when it was founded, arguing that the "editors come from a pro-porn background where they deny the tons and tons of research that has been done into the negative effects of porn," and that they are "cheerleaders" for the porn industry.

=== Reception ===
Dines' book Pornland: How Porn Has Hijacked our Sexuality (2010) has been translated into five languages and adapted into a documentary film. The book received mixed reviews, with some lauding it as "compelling" with "thoughtful analysis of pornography's infiltration into the American economy, its detrimental effects on the sexual and emotional health of women and men, and its ability to perpetuate both sexism and racism." Publishers Weekly noted that Dines' book "raise[s] important questions about the commoditization of sexual desires" but that "solid argumentation is lacking." Her writing has been criticized by other academics, including Ronald Weitzer of George Washington University. In an essay, "Pornography: the need for solid evidence" (2011), Weitzer alleged that Dines' work (specifically Pornland) is poorly researched and in strong opposition to the existing body of research on pornography. In "A Feminist Response to Weitzer" in the same journal, Dines wrote that her book had used theories and methods of cultural studies developed by, among others, Stuart Hall and Antonio Gramsci. Also in 2011, after Dines wrote about the porn industry in The Guardian, Lynn Comella, women's studies professor at the University of Nevada, Las Vegas, excoriated the book as "downright toxic", accusing her of failing "to address counterevidence".

Robert Jensen reviewed the book favorably, saying it describes how "porn culture has been a setback to gender justice" and that while "the worst racist stereotypes have been eliminated from mainstream movies and television, they flourish in pornography". Robert Muller in Psychology Today says that her historical survey of the porn business is well researched, but that her connecting pseudo child pornography and actual child molesting in particular uses bad research, and concludes "Despite a bent toward sensationalism, the book will help female and male readers question their beliefs about sex and also question where those beliefs come from."

In 2007, Dines wrote an article about media sensationalism related to the Duke lacrosse case after appearing on a CNN interview. After receiving vulgar hate mail, Dines addressed the media's failure to appreciate the complexity of sexism and racism in the case, writing, "This obsessive focus on the woman is not particular to this case; routinely the media focus on the women victims, with a certain prurient interest. Instead, we should put some of the focus back on the men in this case, as we know much about their behavior that night that is not under dispute. They saw the hiring of two black women to strip as a legitimate form of male entertainment. They didn't see the commodifying and sexualizing of black women's bodies as problematic in a country that has a long and ugly history of racism." Writer Cathy Young criticized Dines' comments in an op-ed piece for Reason Magazine suggesting there existed a double standard, i.e. that "the same feminists who rightly tell us that a rape victim should not have to be an angel to deserve support apply such a different standard to men who may be falsely accused of rape".

"Dines's words describing these men worryingly echo the justification that Elliot Rodger gave for his killing spree and the discursive patterns found in the analysis of r/incels."

== Lawsuit ==
In 2016, Dines and one other Jewish professor filed discrimination complaints against Wheelock College with the US Equal Employment Opportunity Commission, in relation to claims that the college's diversity efforts were not inclusive enough of Jewish students. After writing a letter in 2014 in pursuit of Jewish students' interests, the professors said their lives were made miserable, and they became the focus of antisemitic attacks. The college said the complaints were "without merit".

== Awards ==
- Myers Center Award for the Study of Human Rights in North America

== Books ==
- Dines, Gail; Humez, Jean, eds. (2011) [1995]. Gender, Race and Class in Media: A Critical Reader (3rd ed.). California: Sage publications. ISBN 9781412974417.
- Dines, Gail (2010). Pornland: How Porn Has Hijacked Our Sexuality. Boston: Beacon Press. ISBN 9780807044520.
- Dines, Gail (2020). Pornland: Comment le porno envahi nos vies. Paris: Editions LIBRE. ISBN 9782490403165.
- Dines, Gail; Jensen, Robert; Russo, Ann (1997). Pornography: The Production and Consumption of Inequality. New York: Routledge. ISBN 9780415918138.
- Dines-Levy, Gail (1990). Towards a sociology of cartoons: a framework for sociological investigation with special reference to "Playboy" sex cartoons (Ph.D. thesis). Salford University. OCLC 53564519. Towards a sociology of cartoons : a framework for sociological investigation with special reference to Playboy sex cartoons

=== Chapters ===
- Dines, Gail (2013). "Grooming our girls: hypersexualization of the culture as child sexual abuse". In Wild, Jim (ed.). Exploiting childhood: how fast food, material obsession and porn culture are creating new forms of child abuse. London: Jessica Kingsley Publishers. pp. 116–129. ISBN 9780857007421.
- Dines, Gail (2011). "Stop porn culture!". In Tankard Reist, Melinda; Bray, Abigail (eds.). Big Porn Inc.: exposing the harms of the global pornography industry. North Melbourne, Victoria: Spinifex Press. pp. 266–267. ISBN 9781876756895.
- Dines, Gail (2011). "The new Lolita: pornography and the sexualization of childhood". In Tankard Reist, Melinda; Bray, Abigail (eds.). Big Porn Inc.: exposing the harms of the global pornography industry. North Melbourne, Victoria: Spinifex Press. pp. 3–8. ISBN 9781876756895.
- Dines, Gail; Whisnant, Rebecca; Thompson, Linda (2010). "Arresting images: anti-pornography slide shows, activism and the academy". In Boyle, Karen (ed.). Everyday pornography. London and New York: Routledge. pp. 17–33. ISBN 9780415543781. (With Karen Boyle.)
- Dines, Gail (2004). "King Kong and the white woman: Hustler magazine and the demonization of black masculinity". In Whisnant, Rebecca; Stark, Christine (eds.). Not for sale: feminists resisting prostitution and pornography. North Melbourne, Victoria: Spinifex Press. pp. 89–101. ISBN 9781876756499.
- Dines, Gail (2003). "From fantasy to reality: unmasking the pornography industry". In Morgan, Robin (ed.). Sisterhood is forever: the women's anthology for a new millennium. New York: Washington Square Press. pp. 306–314. ISBN 9780743466271.
