= Violence Against Women (journal) =

- Discipline: Women's studies
- Language: English
- Edited by: Claire M. Renzetti

Publication details
- History: 1995-present
- Publisher: SAGE Publications
- Frequency: Monthly
- Impact factor: 2.328 (2020)

Standard abbreviations
- ISO 4: Violence Against Women

Indexing
- CODEN: VAWOFG
- ISSN: 1077-8012 (print); 1552-8448 (web)
- LCCN: 95652958
- OCLC no.: 474579811

Links
- Journal homepage; Online access; Online archive

Violence Against Women is a peer-reviewed academic journal that publishes papers in the field of women's studies. The journal's editor-in-chief is Claire M. Renzetti (University of Kentucky). It was established in 1995 and is currently published by SAGE Publications. The journal covers topics such as domestic violence, sexual assault, and incest.

== Abstracting and indexing ==
Violence Against Women is abstracted and indexed in Scopus and the Social Sciences Citation Index. According to the Journal Citation Reports, the journal has a 2017 impact factor of 1.588, ranking it 9th out of 42 journals in the category "Women's Studies".

== See also ==
- List of women's studies journals
