= Carolyn M. West =

- Born: Carolyn Marie West; United States
- Awards: 2004 American Psychological Association’s Carolyn Payton Early Career Award

Academic background
- Education: University of Missouri–St. Louis
- Thesis: Courtship violence among African-Americans (1994)

Academic work
- Institutions: University of Washington Tacoma
- Main interests: Family violence and human sexuality
- Notable works: Violence in the Lives of Black Women: Battered, Black, and Blue
- Website: Dr. Carolyn West

Carolyn Marie West is associate professor of psychology (family violence and human sexuality course), at the University of Washington Tacoma, and was the first holder of the Bartley Dobb Professorship for the Study and Prevention of Violence (2005-2008).

West is one of the chief editors of the journal Sexualization, Media, and Society. She also sits on the editorial boards of Partner Abuse and Women & Therapy, and was previously on the editorial board of Sex Roles.

== Education ==
West gained her degree in 1986, her masters in 1988 and her doctorate in clinical psychology in 1994. She studied for all three at the University of Missouri–St. Louis. West carried out her predoctoral internship (1993-1994) at the University of Notre Dame Counseling Center and Oaklawn Hospital, Indiana

== Career ==
West completed a postdoctoral research scholarship at the University of New Hampshire's Family Research Laboratory. She has also served as an expert witness in domestic violence cases involving victim-defendants and testified at Congressional Briefings in Washington, DC.

== Awards ==
- 2000 Outstanding Research Award from the University of Minnesota's Institute on Domestic Violence in the African American Community.
- 2004 American Psychological Association's (Section 35, APA Society for the Psychology of Women) Carolyn Payton Early Career Award.
- 2013 University of Washington Distinguished Teaching Award.

== Bibliography ==
=== Books ===
- West, Carolyn M. (1994). Courtship violence among African-Americans (Ph.D. thesis). University of Missouri–St. Louis. OCLC 31601557.
- West, Carolyn M. (2002). Violence in the lives of Black women: battered, black, and blue. New York: Haworth Press. ISBN 9780789019950.

A monograph published simultaneously as: West, Carolyn M.; Williams, Linda M.; Siegel, Jane A.; Banyard, Victoria L. (October 2002). "Childhood sexual abuse in the lives of Black women: risk and resilience in a longitudinal study". Women & Therapy. 25 (3–4): 45–58. doi:10.1300/J015v25n03_04. S2CID 141809213.

- West, Carolyn M.; Ballou, Mary; Hill, Marcia (2008). Feminist therapy theory and practice: a contemporary perspective. New York: Springer. ISBN 9780826119575.

=== Chapters in books ===
==== 1995–1999 ====
- West, Carolyn M. (1998). "Leaving a second closet: outing partner violence in same-sex couples". In Williams, Linda M.; Jasinski, Jana L. (eds.). Partner violence: a comprehensive review of 20 years of research. Thousand Oaks, California: SAGE. pp. 163–183. ISBN 9780761913184. Preview.
- West, Carolyn M. (1998). "Lifting the "political gag order": breaking the silence around partner violence in ethnic minority families". In Williams, Linda M.; Jasinski, Jana L. (eds.). Partner violence: a comprehensive review of 20 years of research. Thousand Oaks, California: SAGE. pp. 184–209. ISBN 9780761913184. Preview. Pdf.
- West, Carolyn M. (1999). "Images of Black women". In Tierney, Helen (ed.). Women's studies encyclopedia. Westport, Connecticut: Greenwood Press. pp. 680–681. ISBN 9780313310720. Description of "Mammy", "Sapphire", and "Jezebel". Preview.

Also see: West, Carolyn M. (1995). "Mammy, Sapphire, and Jezebel: Historical images of Black women and their implications for psychotherapy". Psychotherapy: Theory, Research, Practice, Training. 32 (3): 458–466. doi:10.1037/0033-3204.32.3.458. Blog based on the journal article.

==== 2000–2004 ====
- West, Carolyn M. (2000). "Developing an "oppositional gaze" toward the images of Black women". In Chrisler, Joan C.; Golden, Carla; Rozee, Patricia D. (eds.). Lectures on the psychology of women (2nd ed.). Boston, Massachusetts: McGraw-Hill. pp. 220–233. ISBN 9780072348606.
- West, Carolyn M.; Williams, Linda M.; Mahoney, Patricia (2001). "Violence against women by intimates". In Renzetti, Claire M.; Edleson, Jeffrey L.; Kennedy Bergen, Raquel (eds.). Sourcebook on violence against women (1st ed.). Thousand Oaks, California: SAGE. pp. 143–178. ISBN 9780761920052.
- West, Carolyn M. (2002). "Black battered women: new directions for research and Black feminist theory". In Collins, Lynn H.; Dunlap, Michelle R.; Chrisler, Joan C. (eds.). Charting a new course for feminist psychology. Westport, Connecticut: Praeger Publishers. pp. 216–237. ISBN 9780275969523. Pdf.
- West, Carolyn M. (2003). ""Feminism is a Black thing"? Feminist contributions to Black family life". In Daniels, Lee A. (ed.). The state of Black America 2003. Washington, D.C.: National Urban League. pp. 13–27. ISBN 9780914758884. Pdf.
- West, Carolyn M. (2004). "Mammy, Jezebel, and Sapphire: Developing an "oppositional gaze" toward the images of Black women". In Chrisler, Joan C.; Golden, Carla; Rozee, Patricia D. (eds.). Lectures on the psychology of women (3rd ed.). Boston, Massachusetts: McGraw-Hill. pp. 236–252. ISBN 9780072826715.

Also see: West, Carolyn M. (1995). "Mammy, Sapphire, and Jezebel: Historical images of Black women and their implications for psychotherapy". Psychotherapy: Theory, Research, Practice, Training. 32 (3): 458–466. doi:10.1037/0033-3204.32.3.458. Blog based on the journal article.

- West, Carolyn M. (2004). "Leaving a second closet: Outing partner violence in same-sex couples". In Price, Barbara R.; Sokoloff, Natalie J. (eds.). The criminal justice system and women: offenders, prisoners, victims, and workers (3rd ed.). Boston, Massachusetts: McGraw-Hill. pp. 375–389. ISBN 9780072463996.

==== 2005–2009 ====
- West, Carolyn M. (2005). "The sexual abuse of Afro-American and white-American women in childhood (1985) by Gail Wyatt: a reflection on Gail Wyatt's research". In Kennedy Bergen, Raquel L.; Edleson, Jeffrey L.; Renzetti, Claire M. (eds.). Violence against women: classic papers. Boston, Massachusetts: Pearson/Allyn and Bacon. pp. 73–74. ISBN 9780205392636.
- West, Carolyn M. (2005). "Violence". In Hine, Darlene C. (ed.). Black women in America: an historical encyclopedia (2nd ed.). Oxford New York: Oxford University Press. pp. 281–287. ISBN 9780195156775. Pdf.
- West, Carolyn M.; Banks, Martha E.; Ackerman, Rosalie J.; Yee, Barbara W. K. (2005). "Stress and trauma in the lives of women of color". In Kendall-Tackett, Kathleen A. (ed.). The handbook of women, stress, and trauma. New York, New York: Brunner-Routledge. pp. 207–228. ISBN 9780415947428.
- West, Carolyn M. (2005). "Domestic violence in ethnically and racially diverse families: the "political gag order" has been lifted". In Sokoloff, Natalie (ed.). Domestic violence at the margins: readings on race, class, gender, and culture. New Brunswick, New Jersey: Rutgers University Press. pp. 157–173. ISBN 9780813535708. Pdf.
- West, Carolyn M.; Kantor, Glenda Kaufman; Jasinski, Jana L. (2005). "Sociodemographic predictors and cultural barriers to help-seeking behavior by Latina and Anglo American battered women". In Gabbidon, Shaun L.; Taylor Greene, Helen (eds.). Race, crime, and justice: a reader. New York: Routledge. pp. 161–173. ISBN 9780415947077.

Also printed as: West, Carolyn M.; Kantor, Glenda Kaufman; Jasinski, Jana L. (Winter 1998). "Sociodemographic predictors and cultural barriers to help-seeking behavior by Latina and Anglo American battered women". Violence and Victims. 13 (4): 361–375. doi:10.1891/0886-6708.13.4.361. PMID 10328444. S2CID 28720776. Pdf.

- West, Carolyn M. (2007). "Dating violence among African American couples". In Jackson, Nicky Ali (ed.). Encyclopedia of domestic violence. New York, New York: Routledge. pp. 235–238. ISBN 9780203942215. Pdf.
- West, Carolyn M. (2008). in McCue, Margi Laird (ed.). Domestic violence: a reference handbook (2nd ed.). Santa Barbara, California: ABC-CLIO. ISBN 9781851097791.
- West, Carolyn M. (2008). "Mammy, Jezebel, Sapphire, and their homegirls: developing an "oppositional gaze" toward the images of Black women". In Chrisler, Joan C.; Golden, Carla; Rozee, Patricia D. (eds.). Lectures on the psychology of women (4th ed.). Boston, Massachusetts: McGraw-Hill. pp. 286–299. ISBN 9780073405445. Pdf.
- West, Carolyn M. (2009). "Still on the auction block: the (s)exploitation of Black adolescent girls in rap(e) music and hip hop culture". In Olfman, Sharna (ed.). The sexualization of childhood. Westport, Connecticut: Praeger Press. pp. 89–102. ISBN 9780275999865. Pdf.

==== 2010–2014 ====
- West, Carolyn M.; Buchanan, Nicole T. (2010). "Sexual harassment in the lives of women of color". In Landrine, Hope; Russo, Nancy Felipe (eds.). Handbook of diversity in feminist psychology. New York: Springer. pp. 449–469. ISBN 9780826117069.
- West, Carolyn M. (2010). "Resistance as recovery: winning a sexual harassment complaint". In White, Aaronette M. (ed.). African Americans doing feminism putting theory into everyday practice. Albany: State University of New York (SUNY) Press. pp. 175–188. ISBN 9781438431420. Pdf.
- West, Carolyn M. (2012). "Racial violence". In Berry, Daina Ramey; Alford, Deleso A. (eds.). Enslaved women in America: an encyclopedia. Santa Barbara, California: Greenwood Press. pp. 319–322. ISBN 9780313349089. Pdf.
- West, Carolyn M. (2012). "Lesbian intimate partner violence: prevalence and dynamics". In Rose, Suzanna M. (ed.). Lesbian love and relationships. New York: Routledge. pp. 121–128. ISBN 9781317992554.

==== 2015 onwards ====
- West, Carolyn M. (February 2016). "Living in a web of trauma: an ecological examination of violence Among African Americans". In Cuevas, Carlos A.; Rennison, Callie Marie (eds.). The Wiley-Blackwell handbook on the psychology of violence. Chichester: Wiley-Blackwell. ISBN 9781118303153. Preview.

=== Journal articles ===
==== 1990–1999 ====
- West, Carolyn M.; Stake, Jayne E.; Roades, Laurie; Rose, Suzanna; Ellis, Lisa (March 1994). "The women's studies experience: Impetus for feminist activism". Psychology of Women Quarterly. 18 (1): 17–24. doi:10.1111/j.1471-6402.1994.tb00294.x. S2CID 143332479.
- West, Carolyn M. (1995). "Mammy, Sapphire, and Jezebel: Historical images of Black women and their implications for psychotherapy". Psychotherapy: Theory, Research, Practice, Training. 32 (3): 458–466. doi:10.1037/0033-3204.32.3.458. Blog based on the journal article.
- West, Carolyn M.; Kantor, Glenda Kaufman; Jasinski, Jana L. (Winter 1998). "Sociodemographic predictors and cultural barriers to help-seeking behavior by Latina and Anglo American battered women". Violence and Victims. 13 (4): 361–375. doi:10.1891/0886-6708.13.4.361. PMID 10328444. S2CID 28720776. Pdf.

Also printed as: West, Carolyn M.; Kantor, Glenda Kaufman; Jasinski, Jana L. (2005). "Sociodemographic predictors and cultural barriers to help-seeking behavior by Latina and Anglo American battered women". In Gabbidon, Shaun L.; Taylor Greene, Helen (eds.). Race, crime, and justice: a reader. New York: Routledge. pp. 161–173. ISBN 9780415947077.

==== 2000–2009 ====
- West, Carolyn M.; Williams, Linda M.; Siegel, Jane A. (February 2000). "Adult sexual revictimization among Black women sexually abused in childhood: a prospective examination of serious consequences of abuse". Child Maltreatment. 5 (1): 49–57. doi:10.1177/1077559500005001006. PMID 11232062. S2CID 16420852. Pdf.
- West, Carolyn M.; Rose, Suzanna (May 2000). "Dating aggression among low income African American youth: an examination of gender differences and antagonistic beliefs". Violence Against Women. 6 (5): 470–494. doi:10.1177/10778010022181985. S2CID 73027693. Pdf.
- West, Carolyn M.; James, William H.; Deters, Karla Ezrre; Armijo, Eduardo (Fall 2000). "Youth dating violence". Adolescence. 35 (139): 455–465. PMID 11130591. Archived from the original on 2016-03-04 – via Questia.
- West, Carolyn M. (January 2002). "Lesbian intimate partner violence: prevalence and dynamics". Journal of Lesbian Studies. 6 (1): 121–127. doi:10.1300/J155v06n01_11. PMID 24803054. S2CID 30945308.
- Issue of Women & Therapy which used a Black feminist framework to investigate childhood sexual abuse, intimate partner violence, sexual assault, sexual harassment and community violence in the lives of African American women.

- West, Carolyn M. (October 2002). "Introduction". Women & Therapy. 25 (3–4): 1–4. doi:10.1300/J015v25n03_01. S2CID 219612183.
- West, Carolyn M. (October 2002). "Battered, black, and blue: an overview of violence in the lives of Black women". Women & Therapy. 25 (3–4): 5–27. doi:10.1300/J015v25n03_02. S2CID 142615068. Pdf.
- West, Carolyn M.; Williams, Linda M.; Siegel, Jane A.; Banyard, Victoria L. (October 2002). "Childhood sexual abuse in the lives of Black women: risk and resilience in a longitudinal study". Women & Therapy. 25 (3–4): 45–58. doi:10.1300/J015v25n03_04. S2CID 141809213.
- West, Carolyn M. (October 2002). ""I find myself at therapy's doorstep": summary and suggested readings on violence in the lives of Black women". Women & Therapy. 25 (3–4): 193–201. doi:10.1300/J015v25n03_15. S2CID 147188586. Pdf.

- West, Carolyn M. (December 2004). "Black women and intimate partner violence: new directions for research". Journal of Interpersonal Violence. 19 (12): 1487–1493. doi:10.1177/0886260504269700. PMID 15492062. S2CID 43152332. Pdf.
- West, Carolyn M.; Committee on Professional Practice and Standards (COPPS) (December 2005). "Determination and documentation of the need for practice guidelines". American Psychologist. 60 (9): 976–978. doi:10.1037/0003-066X.60.9.976. PMID 16366819. Pdf.

Members of the Committee on Professional Practice and Standards (COPPS): Cynthia A. Sturm; Kristin A. Hancock; Armand R. Cerbone; Victor de La Cancela; Mary A. Connell; William E. Foote; Michele M. Galietta; Larry C. James; Leigh W. Jerome; Sara J. Knight; David C. Mohr; and Philip H. Witt.

- West, Carolyn M.; Koss, Mary P.; Abbey, Antonia; Campbell, Rebecca; Cook, Sarah; Norris, Jeanette; Testa, Maria; Ullman, Sarah; White, Jacquelyn (December 2007). "Revising the SES: a collaborative process to improve assessment of sexual aggression and victimization" (PDF). Psychology of Women Quarterly. 31 (4): 357–370. doi:10.1111/j.1471-6402.2007.00385.x. S2CID 144908721. Pdf.
- West, Carolyn M. (December 2007). ""Sorry, we have to take you in:" Black Battered women arrested for intimate partner violence". Journal of Aggression, Maltreatment & Trauma. 15 (3–4): 95–121. doi:10.1080/10926770802097277. S2CID 144072554.
- West, Carolyn M. (June 2008). ""A thin line between love and hate"? Black men as victims and perpetrators of dating violence". Journal of Aggression, Maltreatment & Trauma. 16 (3): 238–257. doi:10.1080/10926770801925569. S2CID 146691714. Pdf.
- West, Carolyn M.; Major, Brenda; Appelbaum, Mark; Beckman, Linda; Dutton, Mary Ann; Russo, Nancy Felipe (December 2009). "Abortion and mental health: evaluating the evidence". American Psychologist. 64 (9): 863–890. doi:10.1037/a0017497. PMID 19968372. Pdf.

==== 2010 onwards ====
- West, Carolyn M. (July 2012). "Partner abuse in ethnic minority and gay, lesbian, bisexual, and transgender populations". Partner Abuse. 3 (3): 336–357. doi:10.1891/1946-6560.3.3.336. S2CID 143446933. Pdf.
- West, Carolyn M.; Dines, Gail; Johnson, Jennifer A.; Bridges, Ana J.; Condit, Deirdre M. (April 2015). "Introducing Sexualization, Media & Society". Sexualization, Media, & Society. 1 (1): 487–515. doi:10.1177/2374623815588763.
- West, Carolyn M.; Lacey, Krim K.; Matusko, Niki; Jackson, James S. (October 2015). "Prevalence and factors associated with severe intimate partner violence among U.S. Black women: a comparison of African American and Caribbean Blacks". Violence Against Women. 22 (6): 651–670. doi:10.1177/1077801215610014. PMC 5916757. PMID 26503860.

=== Other ===
- Lenhart, Jennifer (May 30, 2006). "Trying to break a 'culture of silence' on rape". The Washington Post. Nash Holdings LLC.

West was keynote speaker at a conference organized by Kathy Ferguson coordinator of the Maryland Coalition Against Sexual Assault. The conference was held at Prince George's Community College in Largo, April 2006.
