= Nursery Crimes =

Nursery Crimes can refer to

- Nursery Crimes (band), an Australian band
- "Nursery Crimes", an episode of Kim Possible
- "Nursery Crimes/My Peeps", an episode of The Grim Adventures of Billy and Mandy
- Nursery Crimes, a series of novels by Jasper Fforde
- Nursery Crimes: Sexual Abuse in Day Care, a book by David Finkelhor and Linda M. Williams

== See also ==
- Nursery Cryme, a 1971 album by Genesis
