= Psychic numbing =

Tendency for to withdraw attention from past experiences or future threats

Psychic numbing is a tendency for individuals or societies to withdraw attention from past experiences that were traumatic, or from future threats that are perceived to have massive consequences but low probability. Psychic numbing can be a response to threats as diverse as financial and economic collapse, the risk of nuclear weapon detonations, pandemics, and global warming. It is also important to consider the neuroscience behind the phenomenon, which gives validation to the observable human behavior. The term has evolved to include both societies as well as individuals, so psychic numbing can be viewed from either a collectivist or an individualist standpoint. Individualist psychic numbing is found in rape survivors and people who have post-traumatic stress disorder.

== History ==
The original concept of psychic numbing argued by Robert Jay Lifton was that it manifests itself collectively. This means that a society or a culture adapts this withdrawn attention outlook and collectively applies it to current issues.

=== Robert Jay Lifton: "Beyond Psychic Numbing: A Call to Awareness" ===
Lifton's 4 Focal Points:

1. Hiroshima as a text for "psychic numbing"
2. Nuclear Illusions
3. What are nuclear weapons doing to us? (Nuclear fundamentalism)
4. Hope for the future

Lifton's main area of focus was the Hiroshima bombing during World War II. He broke up his analysis of the bombing into psychological stages that spread at the societal level. Lifton's article, "Beyond Psychic Numbing: A Call to Awareness", addressed a concern that was new at the time: nuclear warfare. He argued now that there is a single weapon in the world that can cause so much damage, humans need to be more alert and confront the images of nuclear power and an ever increasing nuclear actuality. There is a societal understanding now that countries can create nuclear weapons; this led to Lifton's coining of the term "nuclear fundamentalism".

All these are argued by Lifton to be beneficial at times, but rather inadequate for helping people feel better about the ubiquity of nuclear weapons and potential warfare. There needs to be a sense of control in order to comprehend the consequences of nuclear warfare as well as strategies to combat the psychological grip it has on individuals.

Lifton's final argument regarding hope for the future is that society must take action. He uses Vietnam War veterans as a reference point. He has worked with them before and noticed partial changes, while he agrees this is good, society must adapt an awareness that aims to teach and educate as opposed to avoid and withdraw from the potential threats to survival.

== Neuroscience ==
Psychic numbing has been associated with post-traumatic stress disorder (PTSD) because they share the same attributes of withdrawal and behavioral changes when presented with a stimuli that triggers a reminder of the traumatic event or with a very intense neutral stimuli. The observable emotional response is not enough to understand the concept of psychic numbing. Therefore, neuroscience and the biological activity that occurs within the brain is employed to give people a better understanding of the thought process of individuals who engage in psychic numbing.

Studies have also focused on the habituation of the rostral anterior cingulate cortex (rACC). The rACC is part of the limbic system, which is responsible for emotional processing. It is hypothesized that the rACC determines the, "correct allocation of attention based resources to emotionally aversive stimuli". This means it may play an active role in identifying important behavioral responses necessary to comprehend the consequences of the aversive stimuli. The limbic system also includes areas that are important for memory consolidation. The relationship between all the areas in the limbic system is an area of interest for psychic numbing because it encapsulates two factors that contribute to the phenomenon: emotions and memory. These studies are also a good paradigm for the understanding of psychic numbing because they consider sustained aversive material and how the brain reacts in a habitual manner in an effort to remove the underlying emotional content.

=== Neuropsychophysiology ===
Cortisol helps regulate the stress response via the negative feedback loop, which are activated when a person is subjected to specific situations that trigger the relationship between the emotionally charged memories of the traumatic event and the observable autonomic responses.

Stress can also be considered a brain–body reaction due to external or internal cues, this can include the environment as well as memory. The areas of the brain that communicate with one another are the prefrontal cortex, amygdala, hippocampus, nucleus accumbens, and the hypothalamus. Through a series of feedback processes, the release of specific neurotransmitters as well as neuromodulators occurs.

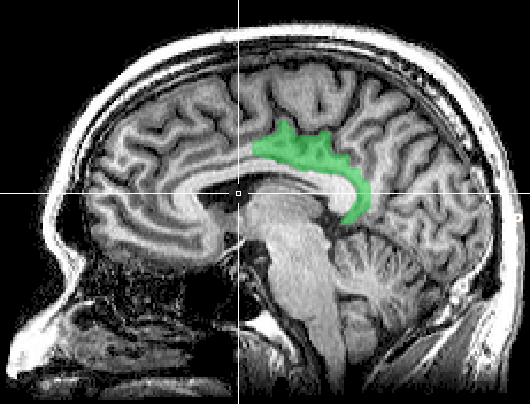
MRI posterior cingulate

Norepinephrine (NE) is released by the locus coeruleus, it is then transferred to the limbic system where much of the memory consolidation and fight or flight responses are facilitated.

Adrenocorticotropin (ACTH) is released from the anterior pituitary, which triggers the release of glucocorticoids from the adrenals. The chronic exposure to stress affects organisms that deal with daily activities and it also interferes with one's coping mechanisms.

Once the HPA axis is activated, it triggers an increase in glucocorticoids. Once these hormones cross the blood–brain barrier, they interact with other neurotransmitters and change the brain's chemistry as well as structure.

The process of habituation is important to consider because it is a prevalent variable in the phenomenon of psychic numbing. The constant exposure a society or individual has to a prolonged and sustained aversive stimuli, the emotional magnitude that the stimuli has decreases greatly over time to where it becomes unnoticeable to those who have been surrounded by it for a long period of time. This type of response is seen in Vietnam veterans and rape victims who suffer from PTSD.

Additionally, studies describe the importance of the rACC and the cingulate cortex for comprehension and the feeling of a painful stimulus. Taiwanese and American researchers recorded brain-wave readings from participants as the researchers observed body parts pricked with a pin, or dabbed with a Q-tip. Half of the subjects were physicians and the other half was a control group. The control group showed clear differences in his or her reactions to the pin-prick in comparison to the Q-tip. The physicians, who previously had experience managing sickness and pain, did not. The authors of the study theorized that the physicians unconsciously numbed their reaction to the pain of the pin-prick due to his or her profession. This may be a beneficial result because physicians need to block out the pain response and use more cognitive resources necessary for being of assistance in a time of need. This further suggests the individual differences people have in regards to psychic numbing and the deviation away from more tragic accounts of rape and PTSD. This type of desensitization is not independent of the participant's lives, instead it is a result of years of experience woven into his or her daily lives, resulting in a numbed response. Figures of areas of the control group's brains showed activation in the rACC, and the physician's brains did not, suggesting there was already habituation.

== Conceptualizations ==
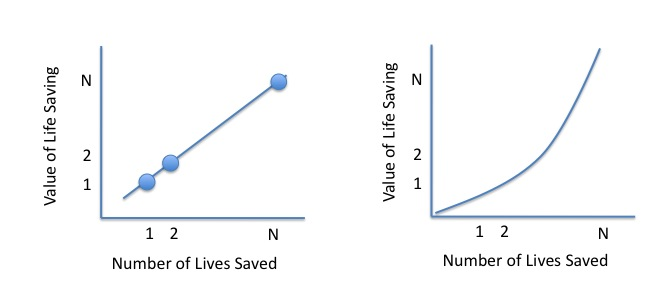
Normative graphs of the value of life saving

The original view of psychic numbing dealt with human extinction and the mass response to potentially life-threatening scenarios. Lifton argued the worry for these events was low and therefore generated an equally low probability of occurrence point of view. This repeated exposure makes humans numb to the possibility that an event of that nature can occur. However, when asked to recall the probability that mass extinction will occur, people have a tendency to think counter-intuitively and rate the probability as high when it is in fact low and behaviorally respond opposite to his or her rating.

Additionally, much of the individualist view comes from studying the behavioral traits of people who suffer from PTSD. Focus groups, clinical cases, as well as religion play a crucial role in one's ability to cope with the stress of traumatic stimuli. Many studies have been conducted that address the value of these therapeutic interventions as well as their efficacy. There is a strong connection to depersonalization, emotional numbing, as well as dissociation from one's identity. This shows the shift of psychic numbing from a collectivist view to an individualistic view.

=== Collectivist ===
Robert Jay Lifton spearheaded the psychic numbing movement and his concentration was on a much larger scale. Psychic numbing is about the way a culture or society withdraws from issues that would otherwise be too overwhelming for the human mind to comprehend. In this respect, psychic numbing is a societal reaction to impending doom, chaos, and ultimately mankind's extinction.

Paul Slovic, a prominent psychologist in the realm of risk, maintains the original interpretation posited by Lifton. Slovic's article, "Psychic Numbing and Mass Atrocity", returns to the collectivist model and most notably confronts the value of saving a human's life. The figures to the right denote both arguments for the hypothesized value of saving a human's life as well as the true value of saving a human's life established through Slovic's empirical research. Slovic introduced the concept of psychophysical numbing, which is the diminished sensitivity to the value of life and an inability to appreciate loss. Essentially, the proportion of lives saved is more important than the number of lives saved. One of Slovic's arguments for this outcome is that people suffer from innumeracy and cannot comprehend the emotional connotation associated with large numbers. The threshold, as stated by Slovic, where people cannot comprehend the emotional magnitude of the loss of life is two, as shown in the figure. Paul and researchers say findings can be summarized with "The more who die, the less we care."

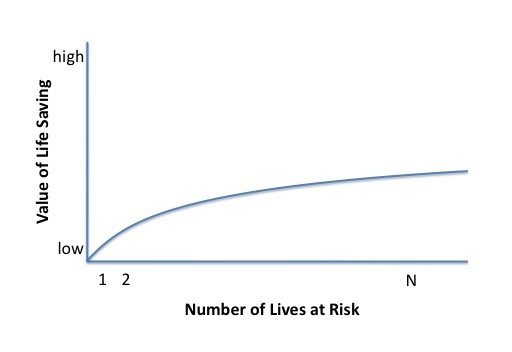
Graph of the value of saving a human life

Slovic also points to Weber's law, which states the difference between two stimuli is proportional to the magnitude of the stimuli. Additionally, Weber's law focuses on the just-noticeable difference between the two stimuli. Slovic addressed Weber's law from a different context – he considered the magnitude and value of a human life. Slovic took Weber's law and incorporated prospect theory, which is decision making based on potential gains and losses, not the actual outcome. Slovic found that when prospect theory and Weber's law are analyzed in regards to human life, the value of saving human lives is greater for a smaller tragedy than for a larger one.

These are all considered collectivist views of psychic numbing because they encapsulate a general theory of mind held by the majority of citizens in a society. Additionally, these views remain consistent with the original concept of which collective avoidance and attention withdrawal becomes the active state of mind in regards to potential threats of mass extinction.

=== Individualist ===
Psychic numbing, as it shifts away from the collectivist view, is a common characteristic of people who suffer from PTSD. A general definition of psychic numbing is a diminished response to the external world. There are three elements that attribute to psychic numbing:

1. Loss of interest in activity
2. detachment from others
3. restricted range of affect

These two mechanisms promote the inability to engage emotionally with a traumatic memory (acceptance), thus impairing the process of recovery.

Susan Gill bridges the disciplines of social psychology and neuropsychology in her analysis of psychic numbing by explaining that there are notable behavioral changes, the most typical trait is being zombie-like and in a "dead-zone".

- The relationship between being overwhelmed and completely shutting down.

The state of being overwhelmed is different than complete shut-down. Overwhelmed responses follow moderate to prolonged stressful states and result in an active effort to regain control.

- The neurochemical states associated with dissociative behavior are not metabolized, that is they become perpetual and frozen in time, which causes the deviation from normal behavior.

The very anatomy of the brain can be manipulated under extreme cases of psychic numbing. The neurochemical reactions fail to metabolize and result in lack of synaptic connections and neuronal firing with no dendritic connections. There is also a loop of the same information that fails to connect with other areas of the brain, which results in the inability to get out of the "dead-zone".

== Religion ==
Religion is also considered to be an internalized coping mechanism. The role of religious values in coping with life-threatening illnesses is another individualistic trait that people use to cope with the behavioral side-effects associated with the diseases. Depersonalization is a very prominent behavioral trait associated with cancer patients. Findings show that people with cancer cope no worse than non-cancer patients. Cancer patients tend to blunt his or her experiences as a means of handling a painful reality. Avoidance and denial are typical tendencies of psychic numbing. Cancer patients also report a self-distancing mechanism, and take on a third-person perspective as a means of dealing with the life-threatening disease. It is argued that putting one's life within a framework of religion is a very important part of the coping process. This religious framework helps the patients understand that some things are out of one's control. As discussed earlier, a lack of control over one's stressful stimuli generates a degree of psychic numbing. However, by putting his or her life-threatening disease within a religious framework takes the mystery out of the disease and adds a sense of control. As discussed earlier, the perceived sense of control as well as actual control are important contributors to adequately coping with psychic numbing.

As described earlier, research on psychic numbing has suggested that people who become desensitized to suffering may be more adept in dealing with an upsetting or dangerous situation.

== Nuclear denial disorder ==
Many individuals fail to react effectively to the overwhelming threat of annihilation by nuclear warfare, and in 1987 Thomas C. Wear termed this nuclear denial disorder, a type of psychic numbing. It involves the over-use of a denial defense mechanism, and "an apathetic business-as-usual attitude toward the threat of nuclear annihilation". Michael D. Newcomb viewed nuclear denial as an avoidant response to quite justifiable nuclear anxiety.
