= Bentler =

Bentler may refer to:

- Bentler Nature Park, located in Sarıyer, Turkey
- Peter M. Bentler (fl. 1964), American psychologist and statistician
