= Partner violence in hip-hop =

Overview of partner violence in hip hop

Forbes magazine reported in 2017 that hip hop was the "dominant musical genre" in the U.S. music industry and, for the first time, outsold any other U.S. musical genre. With its cultural foundation in the South Bronx, hip hop has grown in popularity since its beginnings in 1979. Popular dominance of the genre coincided with the international #MeToo movement, which exposed the sexual misconduct of men in positions of power in the field of entertainment. Although women and men from all walks of life worldwide have shared their #MeToo stories, accounts in the music industry (particularly in the genre of rap) were few; the industry evaded public scrutiny, despite its dominance as broadcast and streaming media.

A controversial issue in rap and hip-hop culture since its inception has been the violence and aggression of its hardcore styles. The prevalence of misogyny, sexism and sexual violence in the lyrics of the most-popular gangsta rap lyrics triggered public debate about obscenity and indecency and was a topic of U.S. Senate hearings during the mid-1990s. The common depiction of women as video vixens in music videos and being called "bitches" or "hos" in derogatory and misogynistic lyrics may escalate gender violence and anti-black misogyny (misogynoir). The multi-platinum sales of The Chronic by Dr. Dre (featuring Snoop Doggy Dogg) in 1992 bely the genre's lyrics. In 1999, Anthony M. Giovacchini wrote about a song from the album in the journal Poverty and Prejudice: Media and Race:

"Nuthin' but a 'G' Thang" reads:

'And before me dig on a bitch I have to find a contraceptive.
You never know, she could be earn'n her man and learn'n her man
And at the same time burn'n her man
And you know I ain't wit' that shit lieutenant
Ain't no pussy good enough to get free ride on my [B]ennett.'

These lyrics portray women as dirty sex toys that have no value other than the pleasure they can provide during intercourse.

Critics say that the pervasive usage of misogynistic language in rap and other popular genres, such as country music, can help normalize attitudes trivializing women and encouraging sexual assault. Misogynistic lyrics in popular music may contribute to rape culture. Songs referring to girls or women of color as usable or disposable, with lyrics suggesting rape, assault and murder, evoke concern and criticism. Feminist critiques insert "new questions about representation, [provide] additional insight about embodied experience, and [offer] alternative models for critical engagement" with hip hop, and misogynistic rhetoric has been discussed in academic literature.

Songs considered misogynistic or sexist may be amplified by artists such as Rick Ross or XXXTentacion in an age of mobile music and technology. People from different age groups (tweens to adults) and backgrounds in the U.S. and abroad have been repeatedly exposed to this content. Artists accused of violence against women or sexual assault may still circulate their music. Case outcomes may be ignored due to love of the music (if not the lyrics) and the artists who perform it. Consumers of rap and hip hop may perceive intimate-partner violence as normal, rather than harmful.

The American Academy of Pediatrics (AAP) reported in 2001 that music, film and television convey "sexual messages" which are increasingly "explicit in dialogue, lyrics, and behavior ... These messages contain unrealistic, inaccurate, and misleading information that young people accept as fact." In 2010, another AAP report stated that representations of sexuality in mass media such as music can lead to a "major disconnect between what mainstream media portray—casual sex and sexuality with no consequences—and what children and teenagers need—straightforward information about human sexuality and the need for contraception when having sex."

In "Still on the Auction Block: The (S)exploitation of Black Adolescent Girls in Rap(e) Music and Hip-Hop Culture", a chapter of The Sexualization of Childhood, Carolyn M. West discusses the effect of rape and sexual images in hip hop. West writes, "Exposure to sexualized images in hip-hop has been found to influence black girls perception of male-female gender roles, attitudes toward sexual assault, physical dating violence, and physical attractiveness ... Music videos and lyrics that perpetuate gender inequality and glorify risky sexual behaviors but rarely provide healthy sexual messages or emphasize possible negative health consequences may increase the likelihood that black adolescent girls will have unplanned pregnancies, early sexual onset, or sexually transmitted disease acquisition, including HIV/AIDS."

== Partner and sexual violence in hip-hop lyrics ==
Debate about sexist lyrics in various genres of popular music began during the 1980s. According to Ummni Khan, a "kink lens" can be used to identify a feminist reading of rap lyrics as "rapey" or "allegedly perpetuat[ing] sexual violence, misogyny, and rape myths." Some critics see the hypersexualized discourse which targets women in rap songs as a sign of toxic masculinity in a patriarchal culture, and others view feminist critiques as politically correct. Eva Cooke wrote that homosociality (male bonding and patriarchal discourse focusing on black male actors in the lyrics of many rap songs) may be healthy, but can "turn toxic and violent" with misogynistic lyrics denigrating black women.

=== 1980s ===
- In 1983, Too Short released "Don't Stop Rappin'". Too Shorts wrote in his lyrics, "Sir Too Short was coming up I did just what I wanted to but when I finished what did I do, I took her home, real real fast. I charged her up for wasted gas."
- In 1988, the rap group N.W.A released "A Bitch iz a Bitch". Ice Cube wrote in its lyrics, "But a nigga like me, I say 'fuck you'. Do like Ice Cube, slam her ass in a ditch (slam her ass), 'cause a bitch is a bitch".
- In 1989, 2 Live Crew released "Me So Horny" with notorious for its explicit sexual content with lyrics like "I say "What's wrong, baby doll, with a quick nut?" Cause you're the one, and you shouldn't be mad. I won't tell your mama if you don't tell your dad. I know he'll be disgusted when he sees your pussy busted."
- Tone Loc's 1989 "Funky Cold Medina" has lyrics about an aphrodisiac: "I thought she would be good to go with a little funky cold medina. She said 'I'd like a drink' and I said 'um, okay, I'll go get it', then a couple of sips she cold-licked her lips, and I knew that she was with it."

=== 1990s ===
- N.W.A's 1991 song, "She Swallowed It," is about fellatio: "She looked at me, I was surprised. But wasn't passin' up the chance of my dick gettin' baptized. I told the bitch to do it quick. You little ho', hurry up and suck my dick!"
- In 1992, Dr. Dre, two members of Tha Dogg Pound, Jewell and Snoop Dogg recorded "Bitches Ain't Shit." Its lyrics belittle women for performing oral sex: "Bitches ain't shit but hoes and tricks, lick on these nuts and suck on the dick, Get the fuck out after you're done."
- Too Short's 1993 song, "All My Bitches Are Gone", describes domination and physical abuse: "Well now I got a rep and they say I'm wrong I beat my broad ass and she moved back home ... Came in one night I was buzzin', Bitch tried to front me for fuckin' her cousin. She started yellin', man, the bitch got raw, I took one step back and went straight to her jaw."
- Kool G Rap's 1996 "Hey Mister Mister" raps about beating a woman: "Bitch why you lyin', bitch you've been cheatin'/Now I gotsta to give your motherfuckin' ass a beatin/I punched her in the ribcage and kicked her in the stomach/Take off all my motherfuckin' jewellery, bitch run it/I stomped her and I kicked her and I punched her in the face."
- Eminem's 1997 song, "Low Down, Dirty", contains lyrics encouraging violence against women: "Bitch getter, hid in the bush like Margot Kidder. Jumped out (RRRAH!), killed the bitch and did her ... Slap dips, support domestic violence. Beat your bitch's ass while your kids stare in silence".
- DMX's 1998 song "X is Coming", from It's Dark and Hell Is Hot, contains lyrics normalizing physical (including sexual) violence: "Tryin’ to send the bitch back to her maker. And if you got a daughter older than 15, I’mma rape her".
- In 1999, Eminem released "Kim". where he vividly narrates an altercation leading to the murder of his then-wife, Kim. His lyrics wrote: "Baby, you're so precious, daddy's so proud of you. Sit down, bitch! You move again, I'll beat the shit out of you!"

=== 2000s ===
- Eminem's 2000 song, "Kill You", contains the following lyrics: "Slut, you think I won't choke no whore 'til the vocal cords don't work in her throat no more?"
- Ja Rule's 2001 "Always On Time" alludes to drugging women: "I got two or three hoes for every V and I keep 'em drugged up off that ecstasy." Jadakiss' 2001 "Fuckin' or What?" contains the lyrics, "It's damn near 4 in the morning ain't shit to discuss. Til you ask which dick do you suck."
- Jay-Z's 2002 "Bitches & Sisters": "You ain't no better cause you don't be fucking rappers. You only fuck with actors, you still getting fucked backwards."
- Esham's 2003 "Ex-Girlfriend": "I used to love her, too bad I had to put a slug through her. Dumped her body in the trash like I never knew her. Blood runnin' down the gutter into the sewer. Her body stunk for weeks like horse manure." Big L released Harlem's Finest - A Freestyle History, which included "Stretch & Bobbito '95 pt. II", that year. The track contained the lyrics, "So we can never be a couple hun. Fuck love, all I got for ho's is hard dick and bubble gum."
- In 2009, rapper Q Strange released Rare Cuts 2: The Qurrupted Sessions. The album cover depicts a bloody, underwear-clad woman in a body bag. One of its songs, "Slap Dat Hoe" contains the following lyrics such as, "And I snap and I grab a stupid bitch by her throat.Then I smack that broad silly yeah I crack fuckin' hoes. Yeah I know 'What a tough guy he hits little chicks.' Damn straight, she talkin' shit, I punch that bitch in her lip."

=== 2010s ===
- In 2010, Nicki Minaj and Eminem released "Roman's Revenge". Part of Eminem's verse includes the insinuation that he and a woman are in a violent relationship: "Who just spit in my fuckin' face and called me a fuckin' tightwad so finally I broke down and bought her an iPod and caught her stealing my music so I tied her arms and legs to the bed, set up the camera and pissed twice on her, look, two pees and a tripod!"
- Tyler, the Creator released "Bitch Suck Dick", featuring Jasper and Taco, in 2011. Jasper alluded to physical abuse: "Beat your bitch in her mouth just for talkin' shit, you lurkin' bitch? Well, I see that shit Once again I gotta punch a bitch in her shit." Lloyd Banks released "Love Me in the Hood" that year, with lyrics suggesting more abuse against women: "Hit the after-burner, Ike Turner, how I drop a bitch."
- In 2013, "U.O.E.N.O." was released by Future and Rick Ross. Ross's lyrics allude to date rape: "Put a molly in her champagne, she ain't even know it. I took her home and enjoyed that, she ain't even know it." Robin Thicke released "Blurred Lines" that year. The song, which was on the Billboard Hot 100 for 33 weeks, contained lyrics by guest rapper T.I. which alluded to rape: "I’ll give you something big enough to tear your ass in two".
- In 2014, the Migos, a music group formerly composed of Offset, Takeoff and Quavo, released the track "Fight Night". The Migos rap: "Hit it with the left, hit it with the right, I'ma knock the pussy out like fight night, Beat it with the left, beat it with the right, I'ma knock the pussy out like fight night". Within these lyrics, the Migos are referring to having sex through the use of words such as "Beat it", or "Hit it"; these references draw a connection between violence and sex with their partner,
- In Beyoncé's 2014 song "Drunk in Love", Jay-Z raps: "Catch a charge I might, beat the box up like Mike, In '97 I bite, I’m Ike, Turner, turnup, Baby nah, I don’t play, I said eat the cake, Anna Mae, Eat the cake, Anna Mae." The lyrics refer to boxer Mike Tyson who was convicted of rape in 1992 and bit off a piece of Evander Holyfield's ear during a 1997 boxing match. They also refer to a scene in What's Love Got To Do With It when Tina Turner has cake shoved in her face by her husband, Ike Turner. "I Made It", released by Young Thug and Rich Homie Quan that year, has lyrics alluding to rape: "I don’t want your ho, just want that cookie from her/She tried to resist, so I took it from her / How are you gonna tell me no? You must not know who I am."
- Schoolboy Q released "Die Wit Em" in 2019, with lyrics alluding to promiscuity and violence: "Mix and match my bitch, she real different, ayy. Beat my bitches’ asses dumb stupid, ayy."
- In 2019, Summer Walker released "Me" as a part of her debut album "Over It". Within this song, Summer Walker sings: " You make a bitch have to go in her purse, Or go in her, trunk and pull out the strap, I would never shoot you, baby, Maybe just wave it around, All in your face, yeah, Get all in your face fast". Within these lyrics, Summer Walker is claiming that she would go retrieve a gun; and use it to threaten her partner because he can evoke that emotion from her.
- In 2019, Kevin Gates released the track "Love Bug". Within the track Gates raps: "I'm hittin' that ass from the back, lovebug, Say this dick just turned her out, and it's a love drug, I'm stickin' my tongue all in her ass, don't budge, You been doin' a lot of squirming and hollering, baby, now shut the fuck up". Within this song, Kevin Gates is referring to the act of sex while using many comparisons to violent acts. He also is using expletives to pacify his partner's behavior, so he can act in the way in which he wants to her.

=== 2020s ===
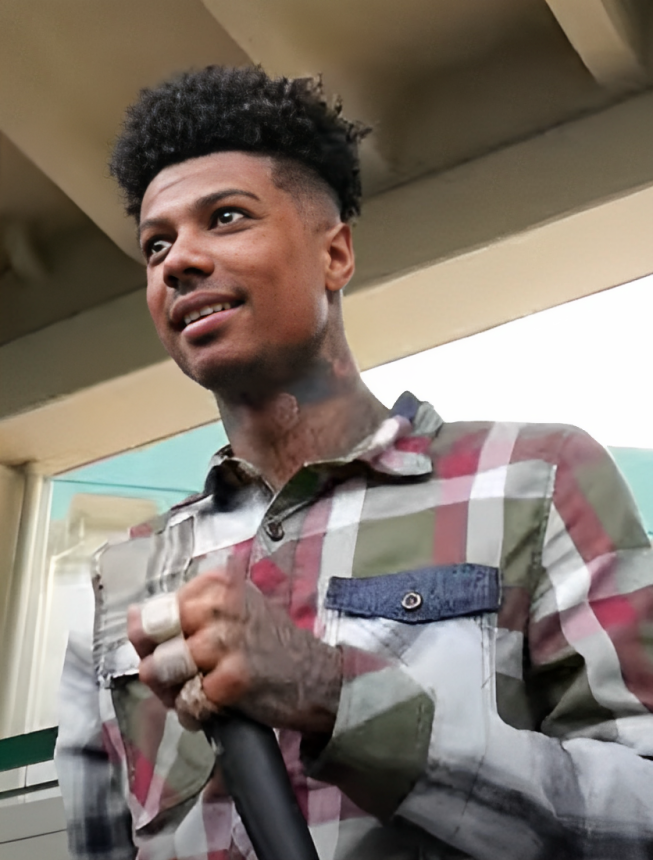
Blueface performing in 2020

== Reported rap-artists involved in gender violence ==
- Dr. Dre (1991)
- Flavor Flav (1991)
- Bobby Brown and Whitney Houston (2003)
- Chris Brown and Rihanna (2009)
- Tone-Loc (2011)
- Rick Ross (2013)
- The Game (2016)
- Kodak Black (2016)
- XXXTentacion (2016)
- Fabolous (2018)
- NBA YoungBoy (2018)
- 6ix9ine (2019)
- The Notorious B.I.G.
- G Herbo (2019)
- Sheck Wes (2019): Allegedly abused Justine Skye during their relationship.
- Blueface (2022) allegedly assaulted Chriseanrock
- Playboi Carti (2023)
- Diddy (2023)
- Destroy Lonely (2024) |url= https://www.complex.com/music/a/tracewilliamcowen/destroy-lonely-addresses-abuse-allegations-everybody-know
- Jaydes (2024)

== Timeline of partner violence in Hip-Hop ==
=== 1990s ===
- Dr. Dre assaults Dee Barnes:

In January 1991, it was revealed that Dr.Dre had violently attacked an American rapper and TV presenter, Dee Barnes. Although they were not partners, this assault was in line with the same kind of behavior that Dre's previous partners had also reported. Dr. Dre's anger at Barnes was allegedly rooted in her interview with former N.W.A member Ice Cube, he allegedly was angered by how she presented the group in her interview with Ice Cube

== Gender violence in Hip-Hop and R&B ==
Surviving R. Kelly, a three-part television documentary which aired in January 2019, described R. Kelly's history of sexual assault. Kelly was charged with 10 counts of sexual assault in the Chicago metropolitan area from 1998 to 2010. Three of the 10 victims were between the ages of 13 and 16. During the 1990s, Kelly was found to be married to 15-year-old Aaliyah. The marriage was annulled, and Kelly said that he thought Aaliyah was 18.

Cardi B has said that she used sex to drug and rob men. She released a video in which she talks about tricking a cheating boyfriend by getting him drunk and forcing him to have sex with a transgender woman. The partner violence in hip hop is not limited to men, although Cardi B says that she has matured. The incidents have been compared to Kelly's, however, and Twitter users have adopted a #SurvivingCardiB hashtag. She said that she reason she did that was to "survive" as a stripper: "I'm a part of a hip-hop culture where you can talk about where you come from, talk about the wrong things you had to do to get where you are."

In 2019, Kodak Black was charged with first-degree criminal sexual misconduct in South Carolina. The rapper allegedly attacked a legally-adult high-school student in a hotel room after a performance in Florence. According to the arrest warrant, Kodak Black forced the girl onto a bed and then the floor, where he committed sexual battery. The victim "repeatedly told the defendant no and to stop. The defendant did not stop." A rape kit was presented as evidence. Black was released on a $100,000 bond while awaiting trial.

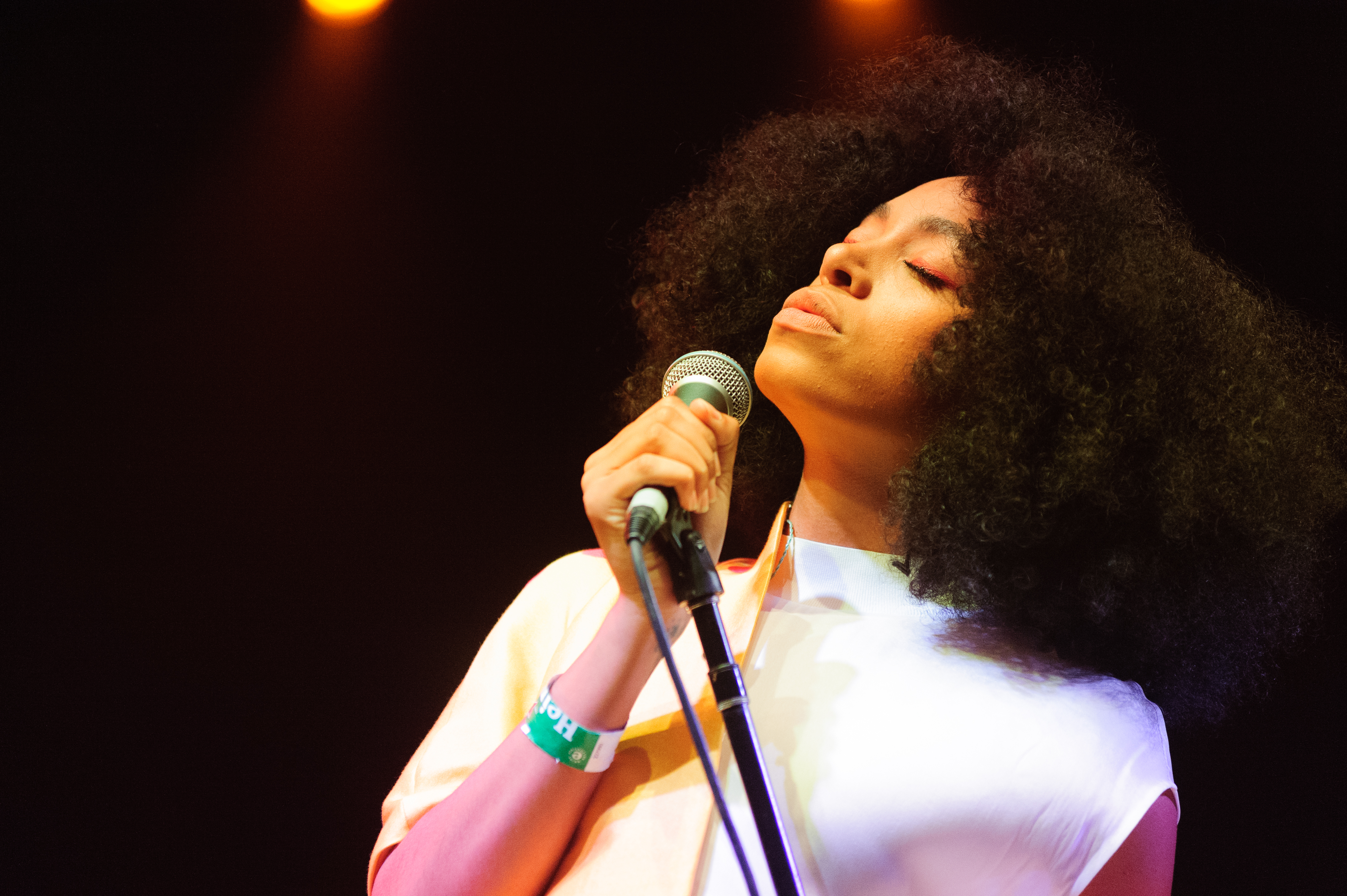
Solange Knowles performing in 2014

In 2009, Chris Brown was charged with two felonies and criminal threats for assaulting Rihanna before the Grammy Awards and was released on $50,000 bail. Before the assault, Rihanna noticed a text on Brown's phone from another women. "I caught him in a lie, and he wouldn't tell the truth. And I wouldn't drop it," Rihanna told Diane Sawyer in a 20/20 interview, portions of which aired on Good Morning America. "I couldn't take that he kept lying to me, and he couldn't take that I wouldn't drop it ... It escalated into him being violent towards me. And it was ugly."

He punched and bit her, threatening to kill her after she pretended to tell her assistant to call the police. Pictures of Rihanna were leaked showing trauma to her face and body: a split lip, swelling, bruising, a bloody nose, and bite marks on her arms and fingers. Brown was sentenced to five years' probation, and they reconciled in 2012. In a Vanity Fair interview, Rihanna said that she thought she was "built to handle [things] like this"; later, she realized that she needed to "walk away." She said she still cares about him and wants him to be successful.

== Altercation between artists ==
Solange Knowles and Jay-Z had a much-publicized physical altercation at the 2014 Met Gala fundraiser. Jay-Z released a statement after the altercation, saying: "We have always had a good relationship. We've had one disagreement. Before and after we've been cool. That is my sister. No sister-in-law, no, my sister. Period."

== See also ==
- Misogyny in rap music
