= Ellyn Kaschak =

American psychologist (1943-2025

- Born: June 23, 1943
- Died: February 20, 2025 (aged 81)
- Awards: Feminist Therapy Institute Award for Outstanding Contribution to Feminist Psychology.

Academic background
- Education: Ohio State University; Binghamton University

Academic work
- Main interests: Feminist psychology
- Notable works: Engendered Lives: A New Psychology of Women's Experience
- Website: www.ellynkaschak.com

Ellyn Kaschak (born June 23, 1943), was an American clinical psychologist, Professor of Psychology at San Jose State University. She was one of the founders of the field of feminist psychology, which she has practiced and taught since 1972. Her many publications, including Engendered Lives: A New Psychology of Women's Experience (Kaschak, 1993), and Sight Unseen: Gender and Race through Blind Eyes (Kaschak, 2015), have helped define the field. She was the editor of the academic journal, Women & Therapy. for twenty years.

== Education ==
Ellyn Kaschak was born in Brooklyn, New York and graduated from Harpur College of the State University of New York with a B.A. in Russian language and literature (1965). She gained her M.A. from George Washington University in 1968, and in 1974, she received a Ph.D. in Clinical Psychology from the Ohio State University. She also completed an internship at the Palo Alto Veterans Administration Hospital.

== Career ==
Kaschak has been Professor of Psychology at San Jose State University since 1974 and is currently Professor Emerita. At San Jose State University, she has served as Chairperson of the graduate program in Marriage, Family and Child Counseling and Director of the university's Family Counseling Service.

She has also taught at Universidad Nacional and The United Nations University for Peace in Costa Rica, where she currently lives. She is the founder of the Ellyn Uram Kaschak Institute for Social Justice for Women and Girls at SUNY at Binghamton.

She has served as the Chair of the Feminist Therapy Institute, the Committee on Women in Psychology and the Committee on Sexual and Gender Diversity of the American Psychological Association (APA) and is a Fellow of Division 35 (the Psychology of Women), Division 12 (Clinical Psychology), Division 44 (Lesbian, Gay, and Bisexual Issues), Division 45 (Ethnic Minority Issues), and Division 52 (International Psychology) of the APA.

== Awards ==
Distinguished Career Award of the Association for Women in Psychology (2019), and the Feminist Therapy Institute Award for Outstanding Contribution to Feminist Psychology.

== Select works ==
=== Books ===
- Kaschak, Ellyn (1992). Engendered lives: a new psychology of women's experience. New York, New York: Basic Books. ISBN 9780465013494.
- Kaschak, Ellyn; Hill, Marcia (1999). For love or money: the fee in feminist therapy. New York: Haworth Press. ISBN 9780789009562.
- Kaschak, Ellyn; Sharratt, Sara (1999). Assault on the soul: women in the former Yugoslavia. New York: Haworth Press. ISBN 9780789007711.
- Kaschak, Ellyn; Hill, Marcia (1999). Beyond the rule book: moral issues and dilemmas in the practice of psychotherapy. New York, New York: Haworth Press. ISBN 9780789007735.
- Kaschak, Ellyn (2001). The invisible alliance: psyche and spirit in feminist therapy. New York: Haworth Press. ISBN 9780789019066.
- Kaschak, Ellyn (2001). The next generation: third wave feminist psychotherapy. New York: Haworth Press. ISBN 9780789014108.
- Kaschak, Ellyn (2001). Intimate betrayal: domestic violence in lesbian relationships. Binghamton, New York: Haworth Press. ISBN 9780789016638.
- Kaschak, Ellyn; Tiefer, Leonore (2001). A new view of women's sexual problems. New York: Haworth Press. ISBN 9780789016829.
- Kaschak, Ellyn (2001). Minding the body: psychotherapy in cases of chronic and life-threatening illness. New York, New York: Haworth Press. ISBN 9780789013682.
- Kaschak, Ellyn (2001). The invisible alliance: psyche and spirit in feminist therapy. New York: Haworth Press. ISBN 9780789019066.
- Kaschak, Ellyn; Banks, Martha E. (2003). Women with visible and invisible disabilities: multiple intersections, multiple issues, multiple therapies. New York: Haworth Press. ISBN 9780789019370.
- Kaschak, Ellyn; Norsworthy, Kathryn L. (2013). Global border crossings: feminist activists and peace workers collaborating across cultures. London New York: Routledge. ISBN 9780415527880.
- Kaschak, E. (2015), Sight Unseen: Gender and Race through Blind Eyes. Columbia University Press, New York. ISBN 9780231172905
