= Linda M. Williams =

American sociologist and criminologist (born 1949)

- Born: Linda Carol Williams
- Citizenship: United States
- Education: University of Pennsylvania
- Scientific career
- Fields: Sociology, criminology
- Workplaces: University of Massachusetts Lowell
- Doctoral advisor: Marvin E. Wolfgang

Linda Meyer Williams (born c. 1949) is an American sociologist and criminologist. She is a senior research scientist at Wellesley Centers for Women, where she serves as the director of the Justice and Gender-Based Violence Research Initiative. She is also a professor emerita of criminal justice and criminology at the University of Massachusetts Lowell, where she teaches graduate and undergraduate courses on child maltreatment, research methods, gender, race, and crime. Williams has conducted research in psychology on topics such as child abuse, family violence, violence against women, and trauma and memory (including recovered memory).

== Biography ==
Williams received her B.A. (1971) from Beaver College (now Arcadia University), and her M.A. (1972) and Ph.D. (1979) in sociology from the University of Pennsylvania, where she studied at the Center for Research in Criminology and Criminal Law.

In the 1980s Williams spent time in Bermuda, working on prison reform and social justice issues while teaching courses in criminology and sociology. From 1996 to 2005 Williams was director of research at the Stone Center at Wellesley College, working in the areas of child sexual abuse, rape, sex offenders, fatal child abuse, and memory of childhood trauma. Williams conducted longitudinal studies in some of these areas. In 2005 she was appointed professor of criminal justice and criminology at the University of Massachusetts Lowell.

The August 2007 issue of SAGE Journal of Child Maltreatment was co-edited by Williams and Veronica Herrera.

== Contributions ==
Williams is notable in the field of Trauma and Memory for her longitudinal studies in the area of violence against women and childhood sexual abuse. As of 2026, Williams has more than 61 publications and has received more than 17,000 citations. One study that has received particular interest is "Recall of childhood trauma: A prospective study of women's memories of child sexual abuse," published in 1994, which has influenced the field because it provides convincing evidence that child sexual abuse can be forgotten and then later recalled. and was important in the rebuttal of the contention that such recall is "false memory."

During the 1970s, Williams collected data from 206 girls between the ages of 0 and 12 who were admitted to the hospital emergency room because of sexual abuse. They were examined, and these findings, as well as interviews with the children and parents, were documented in the hospital's medical records. Seventeen years later, in the early 1990s, Williams interviewed 138 of these women in what they were informed was a follow-up study of girls and women seen in the hospital in the early 1970s. They were not reminded of the sexual abuse record and answered questions about their social and psychological functioning and their experiences with interpersonal violence. Of the 138 interviewed, 38% of the women did not appear to recall the sexual abuse that was documented in the hospital medical records. It was deemed unlikely that the women who did not appear to recall the abuse simply chose not to report it due to privacy concerns, as 68% of this group reported other incidents of sexual abuse from their childhood. The conclusion was that a significant minority of women who have been sexually abused as children appeared to have forgotten the abuse. This has major implications for childhood amnesia and repressed memories. Since many of the women reported other abuse in childhood, it could be concluded that only 15 of them (12%) reported they were never abused in childhood. It was suggested that 12% is an underestimation because the sample was only from reported abuse and not total numbers of sexually abused. Furthermore, because the abuse was reported the women may have been less likely to have forgotten the abuse compared to women whose abuse was never reported. The Journal also provided a reply from Loftus, Garry, and Feldman (1994) titled "Forgetting sexual trauma: What does it mean when 38% forget?" which has since been a point of discussion regarding traumatic memories and repression.

== Achievements and awards ==
Williams has been president of the board of The American Professional Society on the Abuse of Children.

Year	Award
2001	Outstanding Service Award, American Professional Society on the Abuse of Children (ASPAC)
1994	David Caul Memorial Award, Best Research Study, International Society for the Study of Dissociation

== Selected bibliography ==
=== Books ===
- Meyer, Linda Carol (1979). Rape cases in Philadelphia: court outcome and victim response (Ph.D. thesis). University of Pennsylvania. OCLC 244996778.
- Meyer, Linda C.; McCahill, Thomas W.; Fischman, Arthur M. (1979). The aftermath of rape. Lexington, Massachusetts: Lexington Books. ISBN 978-0-669-03018-1.
- Williams, Linda M.; Jasinski, Jana L. (1998). Partner violence: a comprehensive review of 20 years of research. Thousand Oaks, California: SAGE. ISBN 978-0-7619-1318-4. Preview.
- Williams, Linda M.; Banyard, Victoria L. (1999). Trauma & memory. Thousand Oaks, California: SAGE. ISBN 978-0-7619-0772-5. Preview.
- Williams, Linda M.; Finkelhor, David (1988). Nursery crimes: sexual abuse in day care. Nanci Burns (contributor). Newbury Park: SAGE. ISBN 978-0-8039-3400-9. Preview.

=== Journal articles ===
- Williams, Linda M.; Duncan, Lauren E. (November 1998). "Gender role socialization and male-on-male vs. female-on-male child sexual abuse". Sex Roles. 39 (9). Springer: 765–785. doi:10.1023/A:1018864202537. S2CID 146507050.
- Williams, Linda M.; West, Carolyn M.; Siegel, Jane A. (February 2000). "Adult sexual revictimization among Black women sexually abused in childhood: a prospective examination of serious consequences of abuse". Child Maltreatment. 5 (1). SAGE: 49–57. doi:10.1177/1077559500005001006. PMID 11232062. S2CID 16420852.
- Williams, Linda M.; West, Carolyn M.; Siegel, Jane A.; Banyard, Victoria L. (October 2002). "Childhood sexual abuse in the lives of Black women: risk and resilience in a longitudinal study". Women & Therapy. 25 (3–4). Taylor and Francis: 45–58. doi:10.1300/J015v25n03_04. S2CID 141809213.
