= Nuclear anxiety =

Fear of nuclear war

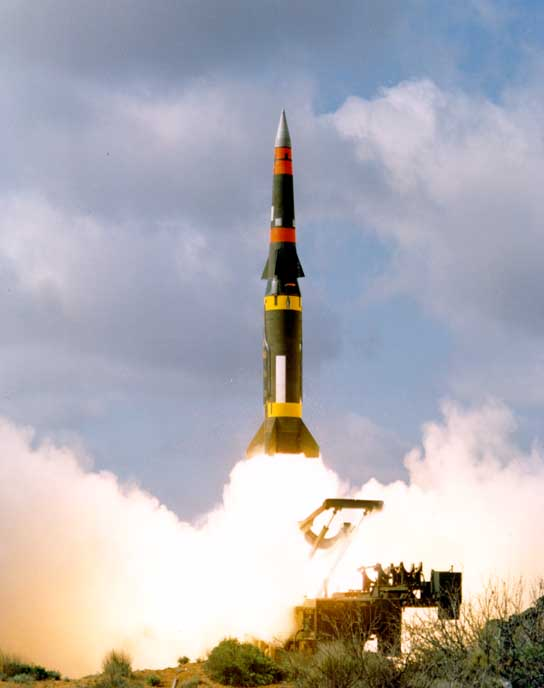
Nuclear weapons, such as this Pershing II, have been the cause of worldwide nuclear anxiety during the Cold War.

Nuclear anxiety, also known as nucleumitophobia, refers to anxiety or even a phobia in the face of a potential future nuclear holocaust, particularly during the Cold War and more recently the Russian invasion of Ukraine and the Israeli-American war with Iran.

American anthropologist Margaret Mead viewed such anxiety in the 1960s as a violent survivalist impulse that should instead be channeled toward a recognition of the need for peace. American psychologist Michael D. Newcomb and others defined "nuclear anxiety" in the 1980s post-détente period, Newcomb developing a psychometric to evaluate it with the Nuclear Attitudes Questionnaire (NAQ) in 1986, although mental effects had been at issue since the start of the Atomic Age.

The term originates from the Cold War period and has been defined as a "fear of nuclear war and of its consequences". It was particularly examined as an issue in child and adolescent psychiatry and much of the research on nuclear anxiety among youth was conducted in the 1980s in many countries. Due to the influence of the particular context under which studies were carried out, replicability is difficult if not impossible to verify. More recent studies regarding nuclear anxiety in the 21st century are relatively scarce.

== Causes ==
=== Historical context ===
The buildup of fear regarding the plausibility of nuclear threat was embedded in the historical and political context of the Cold War. Political events such as the use of nuclear bombs on Hiroshima and Nagasaki in 1945 had proven the destructive power of nuclear weapons, while the Cuban Missile Crisis and Euromissile Crisis contributed to broadcasting to the wider public the increase of tensions between superpowers, and warned of the increasing possibility of resorting to nuclear missiles. Fear of mutually assured destruction stoked nuclear anxiety.

Nuclear anxiety took a greater importance in the political landscape of the United States around the 1984 presidential elections. Two adolescents spoke to Congress of their fears of nuclear war in an event hosted by the United States House Select Committee on Children, Youth and Families on 20 September 1983. The American Orthopsychiatric Association led programmes around nuclear anxiety in children. In addition, Walter Mondale mentioned “nuclear nightmares” experienced by American youth in a speech given during his 1984 election campaign.

=== Dispute ===
The existence of nuclear anxiety experienced by youth in the United States in the Cold War has been challenged by Joseph Adelson and Chester E. Finn Jr. in their 1985 article Terrorizing Children. They denounce the political left of spreading fear among children for political ends. The authors argue that nuclear anxiety was not prevalent in children before the term was coined, and that surveys measuring nuclear anxiety regularly confronted youth with the thought of nuclear weapons to distill fear.

Adelson and Finn's Terrorizing Children caused controversy and was considered unscientific, as the author's criticism of the American Psychological Association's nuclear anxiety-related programmes, called it a “fifty-ring circus” led by “luminaries of the Left”, and questioned the credibility of researchers and journals that published evidence of nuclear anxiety among children.

It has also been argued that wealth, ethnicity and social class have a role in the cause of nuclear anxiety. This claim asserts that wealthy, white children of upper class are more susceptible to suffer from nuclear anxiety as they are exposed to fewer discriminatory or material concerns than children of colour and of lower social class.

Both arguments regarding fear-mongering and social conditioning were debated by other researchers who found no correlation between nuclear anxiety, political preferences and social class.

== Prevalence during the Cold War ==
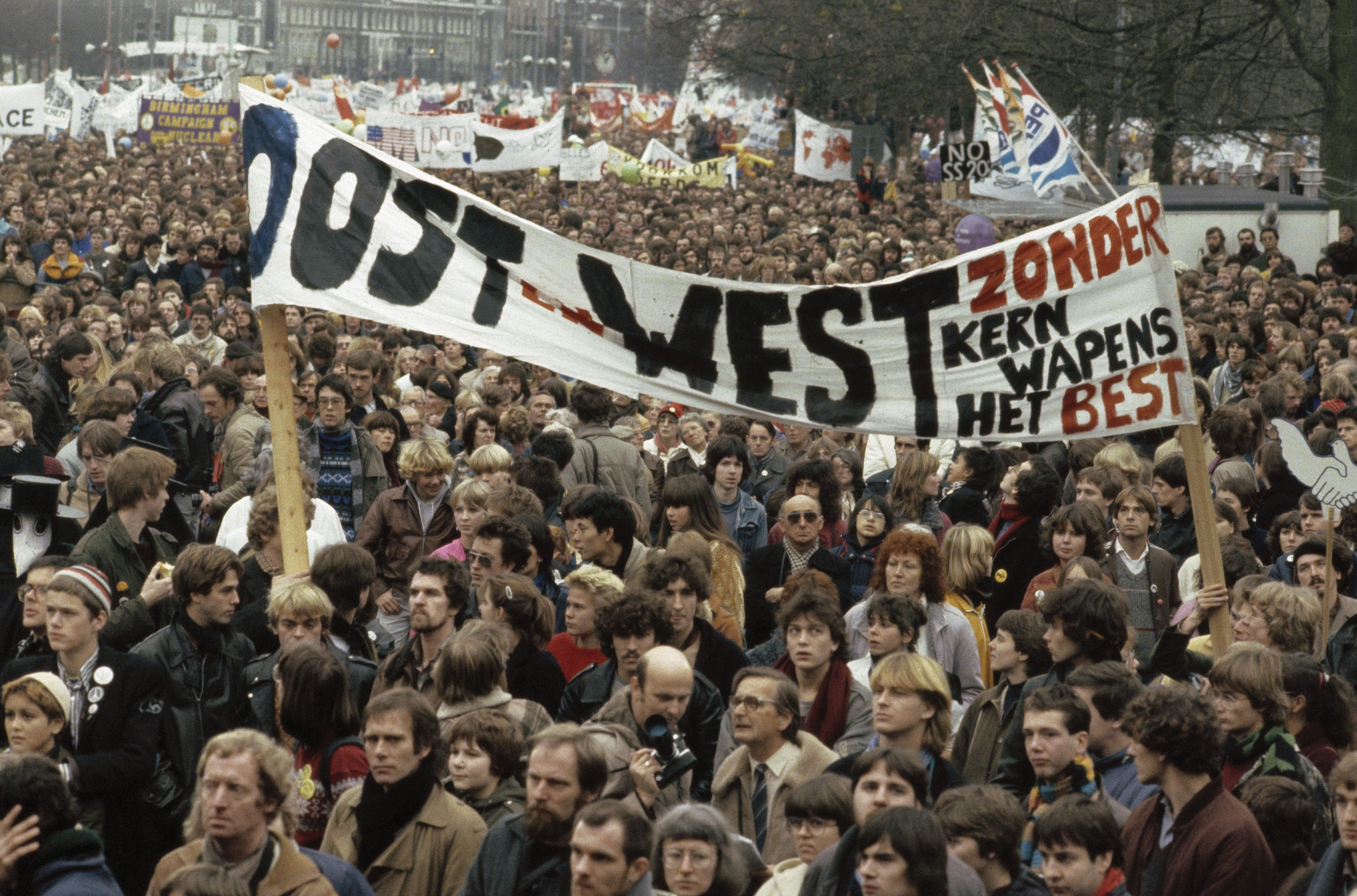
More than 400,000 people attended Hollanditis against the nuclear arms race between the U.S./NATO and the Soviet Union, 21 November 1981

Nuclear anxiety was prevalent in many parts of the world during the 1980s. Nuclear threats were identified among northern European students as their biggest concern, as the second or third biggest concern among North American students in 1986, and was a source of anxiety in Third World countries, such as among Colombian youth. It was rated the most frequently mentioned concern among Ontario students in 1985 and Finnish children and teenagers in a national survey in the same year.

== Newcomb's Nuclear Attitudes Questionnaire ==
Michael D. Newcomb created a Nuclear Attitudes Questionnaire for a study with the aim of assessing 722 young adults’ opinions and fears of nuclear power plants and weapons. The fifteen-item questionnaire uses likert-scale questions to evaluate four constructs: nuclear concern, nuclear support, fear of the future and nuclear denial. Possible responses to each item were “Strongly disagree or disagree”, “Don't know”, and “Agree or strongly agree”.

Description of Newcomb's NAQ
1	Safety of nuclear power plants
2	Concern over proliferation of nuclear weapons
3	Concern over living near a nuclear power plant
4	Necessity of producing the most nuclear weapons possible
5	Cost efficiency of nuclear power plants
6	Probability of nuclear war in next 10 years
7	Link between nuclear power plants and nuclear weapons
8	Provision of nuclear power plants to other countries by United States
9	Fear of quantity of nuclear weapons in existence
10	Probability of survival in nuclear war
11	Never concerned about nuclear war
12	Overreaction over threat of nuclear war
13	Feelings of depression caused by threat of nuclear war
14	Feelings of the world being unsafe due to nuclear weapons
15	Reluctance to raise a child due to threat of nuclear war

== Impact on mental health ==
Nuclear anxiety has been found to have negative effects on mental health on people of all ages, and especially on children and teenagers, and have been found in many countries throughout the world due to the omnipresence of nuclear threats. These impacts typically include feelings of anxiety, helplessness, frequent worrying, stress, hopelessness, loss of meaning or purpose, fear, low life satisfaction, depression, increased drug use, “disturbances in maturational development” among youth, worthlessness, loneliness, alienation, low self-esteem and low subjective wellbeing. Nuclear anxiety also correlated among teenagers with getting into trouble.

Some gender differences have been found with regards to these effects. A study has found that men were less inclined to report anxiety and more inclined to deny the threats of nuclear warfare than women, potentially due to machismo according to the author. Women also reported lower life satisfaction and men higher drug use.

Impacts on mental health also depend on the extent of worry about nuclear threats. While worry to the level of “concern” rarely leads to degradation of mental health, while worry to the level of “despair” has been found to have impacts on mental health that remain stable over time, but that subjects can live with.

Parental denial of the existence of a nuclear threat or of nuclear anxiety worsens its consequences.

Effects on mental health also depended on whether subjects participated in disarmament activism. Those who did, did not face bigger anxiety-related issues lasting until at least mid-adulthood, while those who did reported no decrease in mental health.

== Impact on activism ==
Nuclear anxiety has also had an impact on political activism, notably through peace protests and the nuclear freeze movement. Nuclear anxiety has been correlated with greater opposition to nuclear armament and with the desire to take action about the issue. Those who believe that survival is unlikely or impossible in the advent of a nuclear war are likely to turn to antinuclear activism, seeking to educate others about such threats and protesting to pressure governments to disarm. A greater interest in political processes is likely for those whose nuclear anxiety does not surpass the level of ‘concern’, while despaired individuals may be more likely to support disarmament but withdraw from politics due to distrust towards governments and anti-nationalistic feelings.

Protests such as the nuclear freeze movement have also been shown to likely incite support for disarmament among those experiencing nuclear anxiety.

== Treatment ==
Treatment of nuclear anxiety mainly revolves around finding a way to live with fear and taking action to limit its nefarious effects on mental health. Preparing food and medical supplies to enhance chances of survival has been correlated with increased optimism, key to reducing anxiety. Discussing fears with peers, family and teachers has also been useful to alleviate anxiety and increase confidence. Activism may be very efficient at reducing nuclear anxiety, as it helps minimise feelings of helplessness and empowers subjects. Mobilisation can greatly reduce adverse effects of nuclear anxiety.

The participation of relatives, especially parents, in disarmament activism has been linked to higher participation of subjects and higher optimism.

Some nuclear anxiety workshops have found success at reducing nuclear anxiety and finding a meaning to life in the nuclear age, especially those practising logotherapy.

One study compiled coping mechanisms used to treat nuclear anxiety as follows:

Nuclear Coping Strategies, Hamilton et al.
	Coping mechanism
1	Distraction
2	Situation redefinition
3	Direct action
4	Catharsis
5	Acceptance
6	Seeking social support
7	Relaxation
8	Religion

On the other hand, denial or avoidance of emotional distress and of activism may prevent recovery.

== See also ==
- Nuclear holocaust
- Nuclear proliferation
- Anti-nuclear movement
- Anti-nuclear protests
- Eco-anxiety
- Ecological grief
- Psychic numbing
- Doomsday Clock
