= Jeffrey Edleson =

American academic

Jeffrey L. Edleson
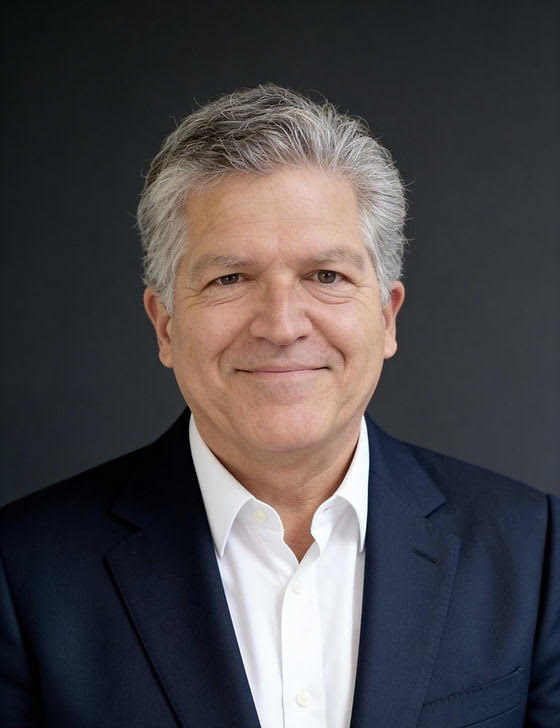
- Jeffrey Edleson

Academic background
- Education: University of Wisconsin–Madison

Academic work
- Institutions: University of California at Berkeley
- Main interests: Children exposed to domestic violence
- Notable works: Effective Intervention in Domestic Violence and Child Maltreatment Cases: Guidelines for Policy and Practice (with Susan Schechter)

Jeffrey L. Edleson is a Distinguished Professor of the Graduate School and the Harry & Riva Specht Chair Emeritus in Publicly Supported Social Services at the University of California, Berkeley, School of Social Welfare. He served as Dean at Berkeley from 2012 to 2019 and was a Professor in the University of Minnesota School of Social Work for 29 years before moving to Berkeley in August 2012. He was also the Founding Director of the Minnesota Center Against Violence and Abuse. He is ranked as one of the top scholars in the world studying domestic violence, being a leading authority on children exposed to domestic violence. He has published over 130 articles and 12 books on domestic violence, groupwork, and program evaluation.

== Life ==
Edleson is a Phi Beta Kappa graduate of the University of California at Berkeley and received his Masters and Ph.D. in Social Work from the University of Wisconsin–Madison. He has practiced social work in elementary and secondary schools and in several domestic violence agencies worldwide.

He is the co-author with the late Susan Schechter of Effective Intervention in Domestic Violence and Child Maltreatment Cases: Guidelines for Policy and Practice (1999, NCJFCJ). Better known as the “Greenbook”, this best-practices guide has been the subject of six federally funded and numerous other demonstration sites across America. Prof. Edleson has also conducted intervention research and provided technical assistance to domestic violence programs and research projects across North America as well as in several other countries including Germany, Israel, Cyprus, India, Australia, Korea and Singapore.

He was appointed by U.S. Attorney General Eric Holder to the National Advisory Council on Violence Against Women and also to the U.S. Institute of Medicine's Forum on Global Violence Prevention workshop planning committee. He was a member of the National Academy of Sciences’ Panel on Research on Violence Against Women and a consultant to the National Council of Juvenile and Family Court Judges and the U.S. Centers for Disease Control and Prevention. He is Principal Investigator of the Child Exposure to Domestic Violence Scale and was the co-Principal Investigator on the Hague Domestic Violence Project that has now moved to Sanctuary for Families. Prof. Edleson is an Associate Editor of the journal Violence Against Women and has served on numerous editorial boards. He is co-editor of the Oxford University Press book Series on Interpersonal Violence and the Sage book Series on Violence Against Women.

== Selected books ==
- Edleson, Jeffrey; Rose, Sheldon D. (1987). Working with children and adolescents in groups. Jossey-Bass.
- Edleson, Jeffrey; Tolman, Richard M. (1992). Intervention for men who batter: an ecological approach. SAGE.
- Edleson, Jeffrey; Peled, Einat; Jaffe, Peter G. (1995). Ending the cycle of violence: community responses to children of battered women. SAGE.
- Edleson, Jeffrey; Eisikovits, Zvi C. (1996). Future interventions with battered women and their families. Sage Series on Violence Against Women. Thousand Oaks, California: SAGE. ISBN 9780803959453.
- Edleson, Jeffrey (1997). Evaluating domestic violence programs. SAGE. (Domestic Abuse Project)
- Edleson, Jeffrey; Graham-Bermann, Sandra (2001). Domestic violence in the lives of children: the future of research, intervention, and social policy. APA Books.
- Edleson, Jeffrey; Williams, Oliver J. (2007). Parenting by men who batterer women: new directions in assessment and intervention. Oxford University Press.
- Edleson, Jeffrey; Renzetti, Claire (2008). Encyclopedia of interpersonal violence. SAGE.
- Edleson, Jeffrey; Renzetti, Claire; Kennedy Bergen, Raquel (2011). Sourcebook on violence Against women (2nd ed.). SAGE.
- Edleson, Jeffrey; Renzetti, Claire; Kennedy Bergen, Raquel (2012). Companion reader for the sourcebook on violence against women. SAGE.
- Edleson, Jeffrey; Lindhorst, T. (2012). Battered mothers, their children and international law: the unintended consequences of the Hague Child Abduction Convention. Boston, Mass: Northeastern University Press. Winner of the 2015 Society for Social Work and Research National Book Award for Best Scholarly Book.
- Renzetti, C.M., Edleson, J.L. & Bergen, R.K. (2018)(Eds.). Sourcebook on violence against women, 3rd Edition. Thousand Oaks, CA: Sage. (1st edition in 2001, 2nd in 2011)
