= Ann Jones (author) =

American journalist and author

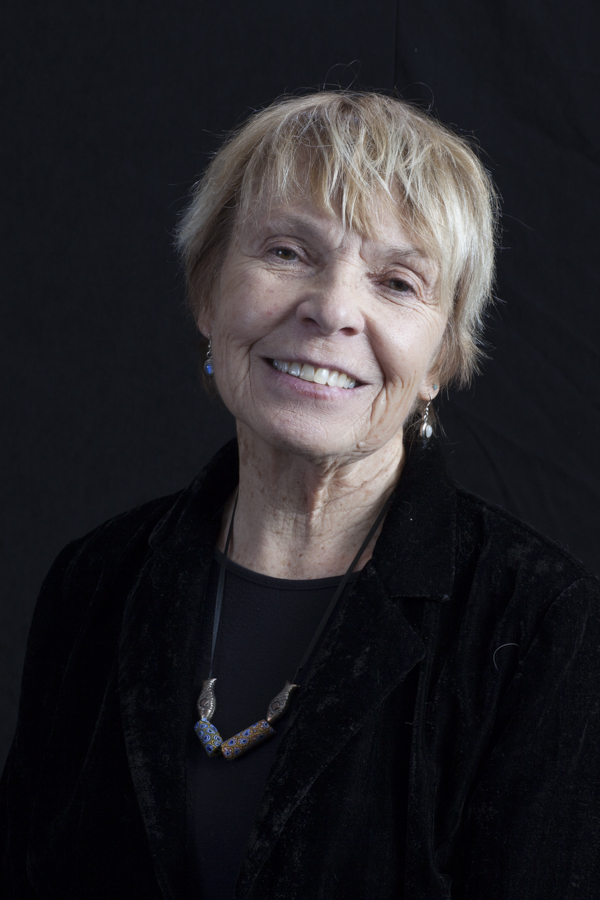
- Ann Jones in 2014
- Born: September 3, 1937 (age 88); Eau Claire, Wisconsin, U.S.
- Occupations: Writer, journalist, photographer, educator, civil rights activist
- Writing career
- Genre: Non-fiction
- Website: www.annjonesonline.com

Ann Jones (born September 3, 1937) is an American journalist and author of a number of non-fiction books about her research into women's and humanitarian issues: Women Who Kill, Kabul in Winter, Looking for Lovedu, Next Time She'll be Dead and When Love Goes Wrong. She has also written and taken photographs for a number of publications including National Geographic Traveler, Outside, The Nation, The San Francisco Chronicle and The New York Times. The majority of her work and writings centers on women's issues, especially domestic violence. Jones has provided humanitarian aid around the world, including Afghanistan, Liberia, Sierra Leone and the Ivory Coast. She currently resides in Oslo, Norway.

== Biography ==
Ann Jones was born September 3, 1937, in Eau Claire, Wisconsin, the daughter of insurance broker Oscar Trygve Slagsvol and musician Bernice Slagsvol. She grew up in Wisconsin and graduated from Eau Claire Memorial High School in 1955. She received a doctorate in American literature and intellectual history from the University of Wisconsin–Madison in 1970, and taught English at City College of New York from 1970 to 1973. She served as coordinator of women's studies at the University of Massachusetts Amherst (1973–1975) and was a member of the writing faculty at Mount Holyoke College (1986–1997). In 2002 Jones became a human rights researcher, teacher and women's advocate in Afghanistan.

== Books ==
=== Women's violence issues ===
Women Who Kill, originally published in 1980 and then re-printed in 1996 was Jones' first widely released and read book and included coverage of notable mysteries including that of Lizzie Borden. The book led to Jones being interviewed on subjects such as female incarceration, battered wives, and other issues affecting female violence. The book included controversial issues including whether homicide was a woman's last defense if she could not get support from others, including the police. Next Time She'll be Dead, like When Women Kill, examined known cases of domestic violence and its effect on women, including Hedda Nussbaum. When Love Goes Wrong., which Jones co-wrote with Susan Schechter, was intended as a resource for women suffering from abuse.

=== Travel related ===
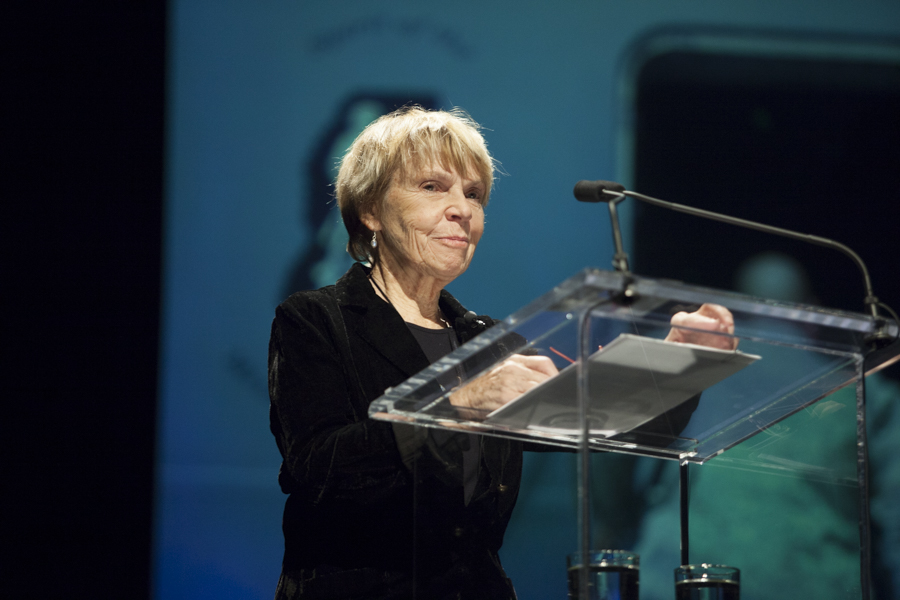
Ann Jones giving a talk as part of the Lannan Foundation's In Pursuit of Cultural Freedom lecture series at the Lensic Theater in Santa Fe

Kabul in Winter, written about Jones' experience in Afghanistan in 2002 and her observations of a city utterly destroyed by war, warlords and the Taliban where she felt a need to try to pick up the pieces. While in Afghanistan, Jones drew on her training as an English teacher and helped to re-train the city's teachers, a challenge in a city where more than 95% of the women are affected by domestic violence. Jones is critical of the George W. Bush administration, especially its policies in Afghanistan, and the ways in which relief funds are used, and her book touches on how those policies made working in Afghanistan somewhat of a challenge.

She has also reported from Afghanistan while embedded with U.S. and Afghan National Army troops.

Looking for Lovedu, chronicles Jones' experience as she travels the length of Africa from Morocco to South Africa and her experiences with border guards, who could not understand her travelling on her own. Jones took the trip with British photographer Kevin Muggleton as a search for South Africa's Lovedu tribe, but the trip ended up to be about far more, including women's issues in present-day Africa.

== Bibliography ==
- Uncle Tom's Campus. New York: Praeger, 1973.
- Jones, Ann (October 2009). Women Who Kill. ISBN 9781558616523.. New York: Holt, Rinehart and Winston, 1980. Second revised edition Beacon Press (Boston), 1996; Feminist Press, 1 October 2009, ISBN 978-1-55861-652-3
- Everyday Death: The Case of Bernadette Powell. New York: Holt, 1985.
- When Love Goes Wrong: What to Do When You Can't Do Anything Right (with Susan Schechter). New York: HarperCollins, 1992.
- Jones, Ann (2000). Next Time, She'll be Dead: Battering & how to Stop it. ISBN 9780807067895. Boston: Beacon Press, 1994. Revised and updated edition, 2000. ISBN 978-0-8070-6789-5
- Guide to America's Outdoors: Middle-Atlantic (photography by Skip Brown). Washington, D.C.: National Geographic Society, 2001.
- Looking for Lovedu: A Woman's Journey Through Africa. Knopf Doubleday Publishing Group. 8 December 2010. ISBN 978-0-307-77334-0.
- Kabul in Winter: Life Without Peace in Afghanistan. Henry Holt and Company. 6 March 2007. ISBN 978-1-4668-2765-3.
- War Is Not Over When It's Over: Women Speak Out from the Ruins of War. Henry Holt and Company. 14 September 2010. ISBN 978-1-4299-5162-3.
- They Were Soldiers: How the Wounded Return from America's Wars--The Untold Story. Dispatch books/Haymarket Books. ISBN 978-1-60846-371-8. October 2013.
