= Michael D. Newcomb =

- Born: December 20, 1952; Laguna Beach, California, U.S.
- Died: February 13, 2010 (aged 57); Santa Monica, California, U.S.
- Education: University of California, Irvine (BA); University of California, Los Angeles (MA, PhD)
- Scientific career
- Institutions: USC Rossier School of Education
- Doctoral advisor: Peter M. Bentler
- Doctoral students: Christine Blasey Ford

Michael Donald Newcomb (December 20, 1952 – February 13, 2010) was an American psychologist. His research focused on drug etiology, as well as nuclear anxiety and other topics.

== Early life and education ==
Michael D. Newcomb was born on December 20, 1952, in Laguna Beach, California. In 1974, he earned a bachelor's degree in social ecology from University of California, Irvine. He completed joint studies in developmental psychology and mathematics. In 1976, he earned a master's degree in psychology from University of California, Los Angeles where he later completed a doctorate in clinical psychology in 1979. His doctoral advisor was Peter M. Bentler. He completed a clinical internship at the West Los Angeles VA Medical Center where he trained in therapies including family, sex, gestalt, and hypnotherapy.

== Career ==
In 1991, Newcomb started his work as a professor at USC Rossier School of Education where he stayed until his death in 2010. He became the chair of the University of Southern California counseling psychology program in 1992.

== Awards and honors ==
Newcomb was a fellow of the American Psychological Association, American Psychological Society, and the Western Psychological Association.

== Personal life ==
Newcomb died on February 13, 2010, in Santa Monica, California, after a long bout with a degenerative neurological disease.

== Selected works ==
=== Articles ===
- Newcomb, M D; Maddahian, E; Bentler, P M (1986). "Risk factors for drug use among adolescents: concurrent and longitudinal analyses". American Journal of Public Health. 76 (5): 525–531. doi:10.2105/AJPH.76.5.525. PMC 1646592. PMID 3485928.
- Newcomb, M. D.; Bentler, P. M. (1989). "Substance use and abuse among children and teenagers". The American Psychologist. 44 (2): 242–248. doi:10.1037/0003-066x.44.2.242. PMID 2653136.
- Newcomb, Michael D.; Harlow, L. L. (1986). "Life events and substance use among adolescents: Mediating effects of perceived loss of control and meaninglessness in life". Journal of Personality and Social Psychology. 51 (3): 564–577. doi:10.1037/0022-3514.51.3.564. PMID 3489832.

=== Books ===
- Newcomb, Michael D. (1988). Consequences of adolescent drug use : impact on the lives of young adults. Bentler, Peter M. Newbury Park, Calif.: Sage Publications. ISBN 978-0803928473. OCLC 16645238.
- Newcomb, Michael D. (1988). Drug Use in the Workplace: Risk Factors for Disruptive Substance Use Among Young Adults. Auburn House Publishing Company. ISBN 9780865691827.
- Wyatt, Gail Elizabeth; Newcomb, Michael D.; Riederle, Monika (1993). Sexual Abuse and Consensual Sex: Women's Developmental Patterns and Outcomes. SAGE Publications. ISBN 9780803947337.
