= Gail E. Wyatt =

American clinical psychologist

- Occupations: Clinical Psychologist and Professor of Psychiatry
- Spouse: Louis Wyatt
- Awards: APA Distinguished Contributions to Research in Public Policy Award (1992); APA Lifetime Achievement in the Field of Trauma Psychology (2017)

Academic background
- Education: Fisk University; University of California, Los Angeles

Gail Elizabeth Wyatt (born 1944) is a clinical psychologist and board-certified sex therapist known for her research on consensual and abusive sexual relationships and their influence on psychological well-being. She is Professor of Psychiatry and Biobehavioral Sciences at the Ronald Reagan UCLA Medical Center. Wyatt was the first African American woman in the state of California to receive a license to practice psychology and first African American woman to be named a Full Professor of the UCLA School of Medicine.

== Awards ==
Wyatt received the American Psychological Association (APA) Distinguished Contributions to Research in Public Policy Award in 1992. The award citation noted her "research significantly advancing our understanding of the effects of abortion, childhood sexual abuse, sexual assault, sexually transmitted diseases, and sexual practices among women, particularly African-American women, and establishing research methods and tools to create culturally appropriate measures of these critical issues."

Wyatt received the Carolyn Wood Sherif Award from the Society for the Psychology of Women in 1995. In 2017, she received the APA Award for Lifetime Achievement in the Field of Trauma Psychology and in 2019, was named Honorary Professor at the University of Cape Town.

== Biography ==
Wyatt was born in Ft. Worth, TX in 1944. She attended Fisk University where she completed her bachelor's degree in 1965 and master's degree in 1975, under the mentorship of Henry Tomes. Wyatt worked for Lloyd Dunn as part of the effort to standardize the Peabody Picture Vocabulary Test and, subsequently, as a school psychologist in Baltimore, MD.

In 1969, Wyatt began working as a research assistant at the University of California, Los Angeles (UCLA) Neuropsychiatric Institute and enrolled in the educational psychology program, where she was mentored by Norma Feshbach. Wyatt completed her dissertation, which focused on locus of control and stressors experienced by low-income African-American mothers, and graduated with a PhD from UCLA in 1973. Wyatt continued on at UCLA and became the first African-American woman to receive training as a sex therapist at the Neuropsychiatric Institute (1974–1975). From there, she launched her clinical and research career, investigating sexual stereotypes and sexuality of African-American women.

In 2016, while serving as Director of the Semel Institute's Center for Culture, Trauma and Mental Health Disparities, Wyatt was honored with the UCLA Faculty Career Commitment to Diversity DEI Award.

== Research ==
Wyatt has explored African-American women's sexuality by tracing women's body images and sexual experiences from childhood to adolescence to adulthood. She has devoted much of her clinical practice to helping women cope with traumatic experiences including sexual assault, intimate partner violence, abortion, childhood sexual abuse, and sexually transmitted infection. In one of their studies, Wyatt and her research team conducted interviews of African-American women who were HIV positive or negative over the span of a year. Women who were HIV positive had more depressive symptoms, less education, and lower income as compared to women who were HIV negative, and they were more likely to report experiencing intimate partner violence. Such findings underscore the women's vulnerability with implications for HIV and STD prevention efforts. In years prior there have been many concerns regarding African-American women and AIDS since it was mainly focused on those who have used drugs and/or had sex with users. . African American women whose age range from 25 to 44 are 13 times more likely to die of AIDS.

Wyatt developed and validated the Wyatt Sexual History Questionnaire, a structured interview used to elicit women's consensual and coercive sexual experiences, that may be administered via telephone or face-to-face. Her research program has been funded by the National Institute of Drug Abuse and the National Institutes of Mental Health (NIMH), including a prestigious NIMH Research Scientist Career Development Award.

== Books ==
- Wyatt, G. (1997). Stolen women: Reclaiming our sexuality, taking back our lives. Wiley.
- Wyatt, G. E., Newcomb, M. D., & Riederle, M. H. (1993). Sexual abuse and consensual sex: Women's developmental patterns and outcomes. Sage Publications, Inc.
- Wyatt, G. E. E., & Powell, G. J. E. (Eds.) (1988). Lasting effects of child sexual abuse. Sage Publications, Inc.
- Wyatt, G., & Wyatt Jr, L. (2004). No More Clueless Sex: 10 Secrets to a Sex Life That Works for Both of You. Wiley.

== Representative publications ==
- Ganz, P. A., Rowland, J. H., Desmond, K., Meyerowitz, B. E., & Wyatt, G. E. (1998). Life after breast cancer: Understanding women's health-related quality of life and sexual functioning. Journal of Clinical Oncology, 16 (2), 501–514.
- Wyatt, G. E., Guthrie, D., & Notgrass, C. M. (1992). Differential effects of women's child sexual abuse and subsequent sexual revictimization. Journal of Consulting and Clinical Psychology, 60 (2), 167–173.
- Wyatt, G. E., Loeb, T. B., Solis, B., Carmona, J. V., & Romero, G. (1999). The prevalence and circumstances of child sexual abuse: Changes across a decade. Child Abuse & Neglect, 23(1), 45–60.
- Wyatt, G. E., Longshore, D., Chin, D., Carmona, J. V., Loeb, T. B., Myers, H. F., ... & Rivkin, I. (2004). The efficacy of an integrated risk reduction intervention for HIV-positive women with child sexual abuse histories. AIDS and Behavior, 8(4), 453–462.
- Wyatt, G. E., Myers, H. F., Williams, J. K., Kitchen, C. R., Loeb, T., Carmona, J. V., ... & Presley, N. (2002). Does a history of trauma contribute to HIV risk for women of color? Implications for prevention and policy. American Journal of Public Health, 92 (4), 660–665.
- Wyatt, G. E., & Newcomb, M. D. (1990). Internal and external mediators of women's sexual abuse in childhood. Journal of Consulting and Clinical Psychology, 58 (6), 758–767.
