= Peter M. Bentler =

American psychologist

- Occupations: Psychologist, statistician

Academic background
- Education: Stanford University

Academic work
- Institutions: University of California, Los Angeles
- Doctoral students: Michael D. Newcomb; Wenjing Huang

Peter M. Bentler is an American psychologist, statistician, and distinguished professor at the University of California, Los Angeles.

In multivariate analysis and psychometrics, Bentler is the developer of the structural equation modeling software EQS. Bentler received a doctorate in clinical psychology from Stanford University in 1964. His publications have over 300,000 citations as of 2023. In 2014, he was awarded the Psychometric Society Career Award. In 2015, he was elected Fellow of the American Statistical Association.
