= Susan Schechter =

Susan Schechter (1 May 1946 – 3 February 2004) was an American feminist and activist against domestic violence. She wrote three books on the subject and helped found one of the first women's shelters.

== Education and career ==
Schechter was originally from St. Louis, Missouri, where she earned a bachelor's degree in comparative literature from Washington University in St. Louis in 1975. She earned a master's degree in social work from the University of Illinois Chicago, and became director of women's services at a YWCA in Chicago, through which she began her work with domestic violence, also helping to found a women's shelter in Chicago in the late 1970s.

She moved to New York City in 1978, working briefly for the Henry Street Settlement before moving to the Park Slope Safe Homes Project in Brooklyn and then, in 1982, to the Women's Education Institute in New York. After moving to Boston in 1986, she worked at Boston Children's Hospital, as a program coordinator and consultant in the Advocacy for Women and Kids in Emergencies program, the first domestic violence program to be established in an American children's hospital.

In 1991 she became a clinical professor in the School of Social Work at the University of Iowa, where her husband Allen Steinberg was also a professor of history. She died of endometrial cancer on 3 February 2004.

== Recognition ==
In 2002, the University of Iowa's Celebration of Excellence Among Women gave her their Distinguished Achievement Award. Schechter was named to the Iowa Women's Hall of Fame in 2005. A special issue of the journal Juvenile and Family Court Journal, dedicated to her memory, was published in 2019.

Her papers are held in the Schlesinger Library of the Harvard Radcliffe Institute.

== Books ==
Schechter was the author or coauthor of:

- Women and Male Violence: The Visions and Struggles of the Battered Women's Movement (1982)
- When Love Goes Wrong: Strategies for Women with Controlling Partners (with Ann Jones, 1992)
- Effective Intervention in Domestic Violence & Child Maltreatment Cases: Guidelines for Policy and Practice (National Council of Juvenile and Family Court Judges, 1999)
