= Hope Landrine =

American psychologist and professor (1954–2019)

- Born: July 4, 1954; Yonkers, New York
- Died: September 3, 2019 (aged 65); Greenville, North Carolina
- Education: Westminster College (B.A.); City University of New York (M.A.); University of Rhode Island (Ph.D.)
- Known for: Health disparities for socioeconomic minorities
- Awards: APA Minority Fellowship; APA Division 45 Lifetime Achievement Aware for Distinguished Lifetime Contributions; James M. Jones Lifetime Achievement Award
- Scientific career
- Fields: Public health, clinical psychology
- Workplaces: East Carolina University
- Thesis: The Politics of Madness

Hope Landrine (July 4, 1954 - September 3, 2019) was an American psychologist and professor. She is mostly recognized for her research and scholarship related to health disparities among ethnic minorities. At the end of her life, she was the director of the Center for Health Disparities Research at East Carolina University.

== Early life ==
She was born to John Albert Landrine and Sarah Alice Palmer on July 4, 1954, in Yonkers, New York, US. Landrine was involved with activism very early on in her life, becoming a president of the Black Student Union in her area and a member of the Young Socialist Alliance. Landrine said that an early influence on her feminist perspective was Betty Frieden's The Feminist Mystique. Landrine also cited the pamphlet Our Bodies, Ourselves for changing how she practiced her activism.

== Education ==
Landrine received her bachelor's degree in psychology from Westminster College in Pennsylvania. She then moved to Cambridge, Massachusetts, briefly worked at the Cambridge Women's Centre before further education. She went on to get a master's degree from the City University of New York. While at the City University of New York, she was supervised by a famous psychologist Stanley Milgram. She did her Master's thesis on the self-esteem of women when making feminist statements. Finally, she received her Doctor of Philosophy (Ph.D.) in clinical psychology from the University of Rhode Island. Her thesis at the University of Rhode Island was entitled The Politics of Madness, and focused on the interaction between psychiatric diagnosis, treatment, and socioeconomic status. Landrine reported that she experienced racist and derogatory statements and actions from some faculty and administration at the university. She went on to complete a fellowship at Stanford University in social psychology and an additional fellowship at the National Cancer Institute at the University of Southern California, focusing on cancer prevention and control.

== Scientific career ==
After completing her postdoctoral fellowships, Landrine was a senior research scientist at the Public Health Foundation in Los Angeles from about 1993 to 2000. Additionally, she was a research director at San Diego State University, in their Behavioral Health Institute. Then, she began at the American Cancer Society as a director of multicultural health behavior research between 2007 and 2010. Finally, during her time at East Carolina University, she was the director of the Center for Health Disparities Research.

== Scholarly involvement ==
Landrine held multiple appointments related to her scholarly work. She was appointed to a task force on cultural diversity in APA Division 35, the Society for the Psychology of Women. She was also a member of the editorial board of the APA Division 35 journal, Psychology of Women Quarterly. Finally, Landrine served as an associate editor for the Journal of Health Psychology.

== Research ==
Landrine had multiple interests that informed her research. She did extensive research on health behaviors and disparities on ethnic minorities and women. Additionally, she wrote on the issues of discrimination and poverty that affect marginalized groups. She reported that much of her research and interests were inspired by feminism, Marxism, and racial disparities/injustice.

== Awards and achievements ==
Landrine has received recognition for her work from numerous organizations and her peers in the behavioral sciences and public health. She was a fellow in Divisions 9, 35, 38, 45, and 50 of the American Psychological Association. Landrine was also a fellow in the Society for Behavioral Medicine. She received the APA Division 45 Lifetime Achievement Award and James M. Jones Lifetime Achievement Award for her contributions to the field of public health. She also received an APA Minority Fellowship that, she states, allowed her to attend graduate school.
