= Shaun Gabbidon =

British criminologist

- Education: Indiana University of Pennsylvania (Ph.D.)
- Occupation: Professor of Criminology
- Writing career
- Language: English
- Genre: Criminology
- Notable works: Criminological Perspectives on Race and Crime (2010)

Shaun L. Gabbidon is a British criminologist and the author of many articles and books that typically focus on the areas of racial and ethnic issues in criminology.

== Life ==
Gabbidon's parents moved to England from Jamaica in the 1960s, and Gabbidon was born there. In the 1970s, they moved to the United States. He obtained a doctorate in criminology from Indiana University of Pennsylvania.

He has held various academic positions, including teaching at Coppin State University and the University of Baltimore. He was a fellow at Harvard University's W.E.B. Du Bois Institute for Afro-American Research, an Adjunct Associate Professor in the Center for African American Studies at the University of Pennsylvania and a professor of Criminal Justice in the School of Public Affairs at the Harrisburg campus of the Pennsylvania State University.

Gabbidon is editor of Race and Justice: An International Journal. He is a member of the American Society of Criminology and the Academy of Criminal Justice Sciences. He has received numerous academic awards. These include the Coramae R. Mann Distinguished Service Award from the American Society of Criminology and the W.E.B. DuBois Award from the Western Society of Criminology. He is the second scholar in the history of Penn State Harrisburg to be named a distinguished professor as an acknowledged leader in his field of research or creative activity.

== Work ==
According to Joseph R. Feagin of Texas A&M University, "Shaun Gabbidon's book on W. E. B. Du Bois and crime provides an original and innovative window into this little known area of DuBois's research and thought. Gabbidon provides much evidence, drawing on original sources, to back up his contention that DuBois did important research on and theorizing about U.S. crime, especially as it affected Black Americans. He shows how in many ways DuBois anticipated later theories of crime in Western criminology".

In his 2010 Criminological Perspectives on Race and Crime Gabbidon comments at some length on the work of Biko Agozino, who has studied the effect of colonialism on the treatment of black criminals. He notes that Agozino's work has rejuvenated the colonial perspective.

Discussing the controversial genetic theories of J. Philippe Rushton in the same book, Gabbidon notes various basic errors of reasoning. Rushton generally ignores sociological factors. He assumes that people can be classified as black, white or Asian, ignoring the large majority of mixed-race people in the United States. He ignores changes over time and differences between members of one group.

== Bibliography ==
- Shaun L. Gabbidon (1996). The Criminological Writings of W.E.B. Du Bois: A Historical Analysis. Unpublished dissertation. Indiana University of Pennsylvania.
- Helen Taylor Greene; Shaun L. Gabbidon (2000). African American criminological thought. SUNY Press. ISBN 0-7914-4695-6.
- Shaun L. Gabbidon; Helen Taylor Greene; Vernetta D. Young (2002). African American classics in criminology & criminal justice. SAGE. ISBN 0-7619-2433-7.
- Shaun L. Gabbidon; Helen Taylor Greene (2005). Race, crime, and justice: a reader. Routledge. ISBN 0-415-94707-3.
- Everette Burdette Penn; Helen Taylor Greene; Shaun L. Gabbidon (2006). Race and juvenile justice. Carolina Academic Press. ISBN 0-89089-572-4.
- Shaun L. Gabbidon (2007). W.E.B. Du Bois on crime and justice: laying the foundations of sociological criminology. Ashgate Publishing, Ltd. ISBN 978-0-7546-4956-4.
- Shaun L. Gabbidon; Helen Taylor Greene (2008). Race and Crime. SAGE. ISBN 978-1-4129-6778-5.
- Shaun L. Gabbidon (2009). Race, ethnicity, crime, and justice: an international dilemma. SAGE. ISBN 978-1-4129-4988-0.
- Helen Taylor Greene; Shaun L. Gabbidon (2009). Encyclopedia of race and crime, Volume 2. SAGE. ISBN 978-1-4129-5085-5.
- Shaun L. Gabbidon (2010). Criminological Perspectives on Race and Crime. Taylor & Francis. ISBN 978-0-415-87424-3.
- James D. Unnever; Shaun L. Gabbidon (2011). A Theory of African American Offending: Race, Racism, and Crime. Taylor and Francis. ISBN 978-0-415-88358-0.
