= Women & Therapy =

- Discipline: Women's studies, feminist psychology
- Language: English
- Edited by: Ellyn Kaschak

Publication details
- History: 1982–present
- Publisher: Taylor and Francis
- Frequency: Quarterly
- Impact factor: 0.229 (2015)

Standard abbreviations
- ISO 4: Women Ther.

Indexing
- CODEN: WOTHDJ
- ISSN: 0270-3149 (print); 1541-0315 (web)
- LCCN: 82645607
- OCLC no.: 50240474

Links
- Journal homepage; Online access; Online archive

Women & Therapy is a quarterly peer-reviewed academic journal covering behavioral science, feminist psychology, mental health, psychological science, and psychotherapy. It was established in 1982 and is published by Taylor & Francis. The editor-in-chief is Ellyn Kaschak (San Jose State University).

== Abstracting and indexing ==
The journal is abstracted and indexed in:

- PsycINFO
- Social Services Abstracts
- Sociological Abstracts
- International Bibliography of Periodical Literature
- Scopus
- Feminist Periodicals
- Contemporary Women's Issues
- ProQuest
- Arts and Humanities Citation Index
- Current Contents
- Social Sciences Citation Index
- Referativny Zhurnal

According to the Journal Citation Reports, the journal has a 2015 impact factor of 0.229, ranking it 34th out of 41 journals in the category "Women's Studies".

== See also ==
- List of women's studies journals
