= C13H12N2O3 =

The molecular formula C_{13}H_{12}N_{2}O_{3} (molar mass: 244.25 g/mol, exact mass: 244.0848 u) may refer to:

- Alphenal, also known as 5-allyl-5-phenylbarbituric acid
- Haematopodin
- Indolyl-3-acryloylglycine
