= Wao =

Wao or WAO may refer to:

== Places ==
- Wao, Lanao del Sur, a municipality in the Philippines
- Wao State, a former princely state in Banas Katha, Gujarat, India

== Other uses ==
- Wao language, a language isolate of the Amazon rainforest
- Wappo language, an extinct language of North America
- West Australian Opera
- Wet air oxidation
- Women's Aid Organisation, a Malaysian non-governmental organization
- World Allergy Organization
- World Autism Organisation
- Yōka Wao (born 1968), Japanese actress
- Oscar Wao, protagonist of The Brief Wondrous Life of Oscar Wao
- "Wao!!", 2022 debut single of Hakui Koyori

== See also ==
- Wow (disambiguation)
