= Gender Identity Development Service =

British gender health clinic (1989–2024)

- Formation: 1989
- Legal status: Closed (28 March 2024)
- Headquarters: Tavistock Centre
- Locations: Tavistock Centre, Swiss Cottage, London; Leeds General Infirmary, Leeds
- Director: Domenico Di Ceglie (1989–2009); Polly Carmichael (2009–2024)
- Parent organisation: Tavistock and Portman NHS Foundation Trust
- Affiliations: Tavistock Institute of Medical Psychology and NHS England

The Gender Identity Development Service (GIDS) was a nationally operated health clinic in the United Kingdom that specialised in working with transgender and gender diverse youth, including those with gender dysphoria. Launched in 1989, GIDS was commissioned by NHS England and took referrals from across the UK, although it was operated at a Tavistock and Portman NHS Foundation Trust site. GIDS was the only gender identity clinic for people under 18 in England and Wales and was the subject of much debate.

In the late 2010s, the GIDS became controversial because of growing public attention on trans issues and concerns about the service, including a huge increase in patients, a change in the patient profile,, and a lack of longitudinal evidence to support the treatments it gave. Some of its most prominent critics were gender-critical psychotherapists and psychoanalysts who argued against gender-affirming care for minors altogether.

By 2020, a large increase in referrals led to waiting lists in excess of two years. Between 2020 and 2021, GIDS stopped offering hormonal treatments to youth following the judgement in Bell v Tavistock, until the decision was overturned on appeal. In July 2022, the NHS decided to close GIDS and replace it with regional healthcare centres, following the release of the interim report of the Cass Review, in order to reduce waiting lists and provide better quality care to young people. The service closed in March 2024.

== History ==
=== Pre-establishment ===
GIDS was a service provided by the Tavistock Clinic. Originally located at Tavistock Square in London, the clinic specialised in psychiatric care. The Tavistock Clinic treated both adults and children, with their first patient being a child. It mainly focused on military psychology, including shell-shock, now termed PTSD. In 1948, with the creation of the NHS, the Tavistock Clinic launched its children's department, which developed many works by James Robertson and John Bowlby on attachment theory. In 1959, it opened an adolescent department and in 1967 it was absorbed into the London Child Guidance Clinic.

=== Early years ===
The Gender Identity Development Clinic was founded in 1989 by Dr Domenico Di Ceglie, a child and adolescent psychiatrist. It was one of the first child gender services in the world. After its opening, "it got two referrals over the whole year". It was initially based at St George's Hospital before moving to the Tavistock and Portman NHS Foundation Trust in 1994. The clinic saw 12 patients that year, increasing to 24 two years later. The last word of the clinic's name varied over time, shifting to Unit before being standardised in the late 2000s as Service.

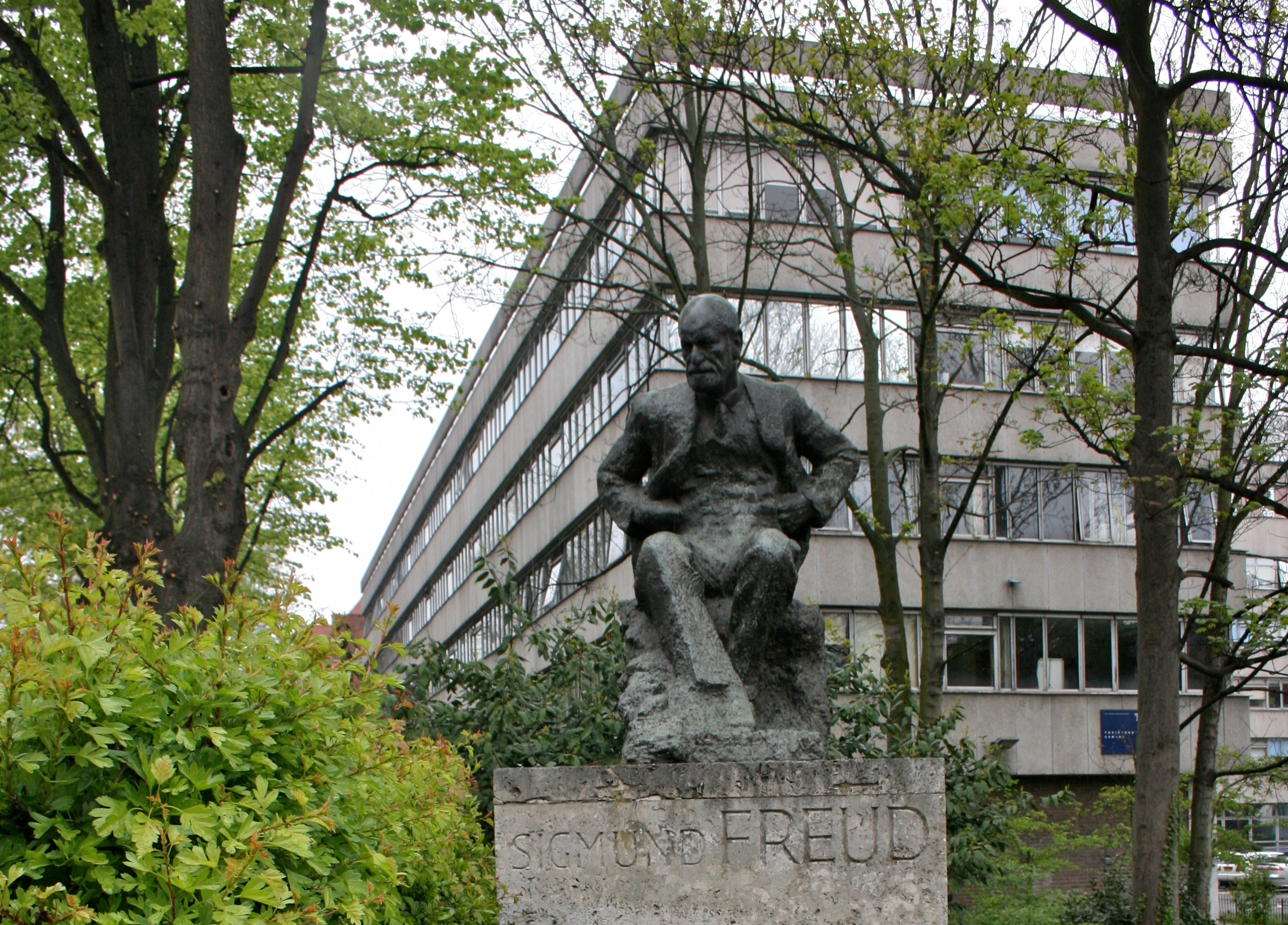
A statue of Sigmund Freud in front of the Tavistock Centre, at which the GIDS was based.

In its early years, the service took a primarily psychoanalytic approach reflecting object relations theory, drawing from Di Ceglie's training. Di Ceglie described the children referred to the clinic as suffering from "atypical gender identity organization". In the early 2000s, some of Di Ceglie's colleagues at Tavistock published articles in The Guardian arguing that medical transition was a form of "mutilation" and that rights won in the European Court of Human Rights for transgender people were a "a victory of fantasy over reality".

Di Ceglie estimated in 1993 that only 5% of his patients would "commit themselves to a change of gender". Puberty blockers were considered a usable option by the end of the 1990s but only for patients aged 16 or over who had first tried extensive therapy. In 2000, a retrospective audit led by David Freeman looked at the records of 124 patients the service had seen since opening. The audit showed it was very rare (2.5% of the sample) for young people referred to GIDS to have no associated problems, that children do not "grow out of it" and that problems increase with the onset of puberty.

In 2009, Dr Polly Carmichael, a consultant clinical psychologist, succeeded Di Ceglie as the clinic's director. In that same year, GIDS became a nationally commissioned NHS service.

=== Expansion in the 2010s ===
In 2011, in response to changing international standards for gender care, the clinic began a research study allowing a "carefully selected group of young people" to receive puberty blockers after the age of 12. In 2014, prior to the study's completion, the clinic received NHS approval to offer them without mandating enrollment in a research study. In 2012, the service was extended to a satellite site in Leeds. Endocrine support was also extended to Leeds Children's Hospital at the Leeds General Infirmary site in 2013.

In 2011, a patient satisfaction survey found the majority were satisfied, but a quarter expressed dissatisfaction with long wait lists. Other concerns included geographic inaccessibility and the requirement for real-life experience.

The number of referrals to GIDS by sex assigned at birth in each financial year from 2008/2009 to 2021/2022.

Between 2014 and 2015, 697 youth were referred to GIDS and in 2015-2016 1,419 were. In September 2015, GIDS overshot its 18-week waiting time target for the first time. The same year, an external report by Femi Nzegwu stated that GIDS was "facing a crisis of capacity" and recommended capping referrals. By 2016 average wait times rose to nine months.

In 2016, the Women and Equalities Committee released a report which said that a number of trans advocacy groups had raised concerns that patients could not access treatment quickly enough and under current protocols and that Gillick competence was not being observed. They also heard that the requirement that youth complete 12 months of puberty blockers before being prescribed cross-sex hormones was unreasonable as youth certain of their gender identity were unable to mature physically at the same rate as their peers. Re-assessment on transfer to adult care was also highlighted as an issue.

In February 2019, it was revealed that the National Institute for Health Research (NIHR) had announced a £1.3 million grant for a voluntary study following young people referred to GIDS, to compare outcomes for those who elect to medically transition and those who do not.

The median waiting time for GIDS patients before getting their first appointment by sex assigned at birth in each financial year from 2010/2011 to 2022/2023.

In 2020, over 2,000 children were referred to GIDS and in 2021 this rose to more than 5,000, leading to waiting lists of over 2 years. In January 2021, the Care Quality Commission rated GIDS as "inadequate", the worst rating possible, citing long delays, high caseloads, deficient record-keeping, and poor leadership.

== Criticism ==
In the late 2010s, the GIDS came under increased public scrutiny because of growing public attention on trans issues, an "exponential" increase in its number of referrals, and the "ballooning" of its waiting list. Critics raised concerns about the service, including the role of trans advocacy groups in clinical decisions, a lack of longitudal studies supporting the prescription of puberty blockers to TGGNC youth, and allegations of rushed treatments without sufficient prior consultation and assessment. In November 2018, parents of 17- to 25-year-old patients complained in a letter to the Trust board that their children were transitioning too quickly and they felt psychosocial factors made them want to transition.

In 2022, a series of news articles published by The Daily Telegraph reported concerns that the transgender youth charity Mermaids may have exerted undue influence on GIDS' clinical decisions, particularly concerning the prescription of puberty blockers and cross-sex hormones to minors. However, in October 2024, an inquiry by The Charity Commission found no evidence to suggest that Mermaids had inappropriate influence or ties to GIDS. A report by Sky News found that, between 2016 and 2019, 35 psychologists resigned from GIDS' London branch. Six of these psychologists voiced concerns there was an "over-diagnosis" of gender dysphoria and a push for early medical intervention.

=== Gender-critical opposition ===
Some of GIDS' most prominent critics included psychotherapists and psychoanalysts such as David Bell and Marcus and Sue Evans. Several expressed "gender-critical" arguments beyond concerns about the quality of the services provided at GIDS, opposing gender transition in its entirety, particularly in young people,. GIDS received criticism from prominent figures associated with the UK's gender-critical movement, such as Graham Linehan. The gender-critical movement united behind the case of Bell v Tavistock.

=== Bell report ===
Dr David Bell worked at the Tavistock Trust as a consultant psychiatrist for 25 years. In 2018, while a staff governor, and in response to concerns shared with him by GIDS staff, he submitted an internal report on GIDS to the trust's leaders. The report was highly critical, saying GIDS was "not fit for purpose", could result in "damaging consequences" to children's lives, and failed to fully consider a child's mental health background.

Since releasing his report, Bell has said that some children who identify as transgender might resolve their gender dysphoria without the need for gender-affirming care if other troubles, such as internalised homophobia and intergenerational trauma, were addressed. He further suggested that most transgender children would desist and that, while he thinks that medical transition is the "only reasonable option" for some people, it would be preferable to help a patient without doing so.

=== Marcus and Sue Evans ===
Dr Marcus Evans, a longstanding member of the Tavistock and Portman NHS Foundation Trust governance board who did not work at GIDS, resigned that week in response to Bell's report, which he supported. His wife, Sue Evans, had resigned from work as a psychodynamic psychotherapist at GIDS a decade previously and launched a legal battle which became Bell v Tavistock. Together, they wrote a book in 2021 sharing their views on how to help a young person overcome their wish to transition and supporting gender exploratory therapy. Reviewers noted the book was full of prejudicial value judgements about transgender people. Sue Evans became an advisor to the fringe medical organization Genspect. Marcus Evans went on to co-found the Society for Evidence-Based Gender Medicine, which the Southern Poverty Law Center (SPLC) described as a hub of anti-LGBT pseudoscience. The SPLC said that "SEGM has helped foster resistance to the idea that adolescents can be capable of exerting agency over their own care", and first applied the strategy in the Bell v Tavistock case before transferring it to the United States.

=== Sonia Appleby ===
In July 2020, it was reported that Sonia Appleby, the "Named Professional for Safeguarding Children" at the gender identity clinic, had been in dispute with her employers since November 2019. Appleby said staff had come to her in 2015-2016 with "a worry that some young children are being actively encouraged to be transgender without effective scrutiny of their circumstances". Between 2017 and 2019 she made six protected disclosures and in 2018 told a colleague that there could be a "Jimmy Savile-type situation". In 2019, she was called to an informal meeting with the Trust's medical director who said a letter was placed on her file due to the Savile comparison. In September 2021, Appleby was awarded £20,000 by an employment tribunal which found the Trust's "quasi disciplinary treatment" of her had damaged her professional reputation and "prevented her from proper work on safeguarding".

== Bell v Tavistock ==
In October 2019, Sue Evans and the mother of a 15-year-old patient on the waiting list filed a lawsuit against GIDS. The pair's solicitor said "the provision at the Tavistock for young people up to the age of 18 is illegal because there isn't valid consent" and that Gillick competence – a UK legal principle that those under 16 can make their own medical decisions "if and when the child achieves sufficient understanding and intelligence to fully understand what is proposed" – should not apply to gender-affirming care. Later, Evans passed their role as complainant to Keira Bell, a previous service user and detransitioner. In a judgment delivered on 1 December 2020, the judges said that it was "highly unlikely that a child aged 13 or less would be competent to give consent to the administration of puberty blockers", and that it was "doubtful that 14 or 15 year olds could understand the long-term risks and consequences" of this form of treatment. Where the young person is 16 or over, the judges said "clinicians may well regard these as cases where the authorisation of the court should be sought prior to commencing the clinical treatment."

Following the High Court judgement, GIDS suspended all new referrals to endocrinology. The Court granted a stay on further implementation of the judgement until 22 December 2020 or until appeals were exhausted. Amnesty International and Liberty issued a joint statement emphasising their concern on "the wider implications this will have on the rights of children and young people of all genders, particularly on consent and bodily autonomy." Consortium issued a statement stating that the ruling "could have a potentially devastating impact on young people seeking access to medical services". In 2021, the Court of Appeal overturned the judgment as "inappropriate", since it was an established legal principle that "it was for clinicians rather than the court to decide on competence".

== Closure ==
In 2020, due to a significant rise in the number of referrals to GIDS, NHS England and NHS Improvement commissioned Hilary Cass, a paediatrician and former President of the Royal College of Paediatrics and Child Health, to lead a review into gender identity services for children and young people.

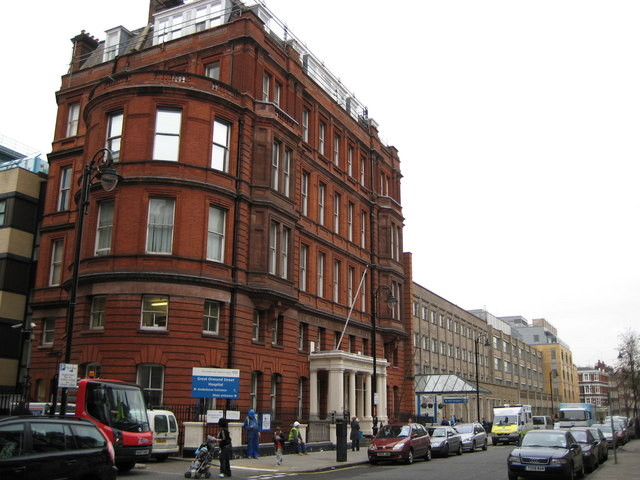
Great Ormond Street Hospital, home to one of the regional centres within the NHS Children and Young People's Gender Services

In March 2022, Cass published the interim report of the Cass Review. The report said the existing model was "neither safe nor viable", partly as the rise in referrals had left GIDS staff overwhelmed and led to "unacceptable" waiting times, and recommended the creation of a new network of regional centres. It criticised the care at GIDS, saying that its clinical approach "has not been subjected to some of the usual control measures" expected of an innovative treatment and sidelined the patients' other mental health needs.

In July 2022, the NHS decided to close GIDS and replace it with regional healthcare centres. The regional centres are intended to provide more "holistic care", linking to other mental health services. After a delay, GIDS closed in March 2024, and was replaced with the new NHS Children and Young People's Gender Services, which initially constituted two new services at Great Ormond Street Hospital in London and Alder Hey Children's Hospital in Liverpool, intended to be the first of eight regional centres.

The Cass Review's 2024 final report said there was both an exponential growth in, and a significant change in the profile of, those referred to the service.

== Services ==
Services provided included:

- Assessments, to assess primary medical aims and necessary support;
- Gender development support, including access to therapy, tailored support and therapy groups;
- Physical intervention, including endocrinological intervention such as puberty blockers and sex hormones;
- Mental health support, usually working alongside CAMHS;
- Ongoing support post social or medical transition and referral to adult gender identity services.

No surgical transition options were available through GIDS.

People referred to GIDS could also contribute to NIHR studies into gender dysphoria in children.

== See also ==
- Transitioning (transgender)
- Transgender health care
- Transgender rights in the United Kingdom
- Childhood gender nonconformity
- Gender dysphoria in children
- Transgender youth
