= Paul Shattock =

British autism researcher

Paul Shattock OBE is a British autism researcher and scientific consultant to the charity Education and Services for People with Autism, of which he is also the founder. He was formerly the director of the Autism Research Unit at the University of Sunderland. He is well known for his disputed research into dietary therapy and autism, having claimed that autistic children may have a "leaky gut" which allows certain peptides to enter the bloodstream, and claimed that they excrete unusually high levels thereof. As a result of this speculation, he has promoted the use of a gluten-free, casein-free diet to ameliorate the symptoms of autism, a theory he developed along with Kalle Reichelt. In addition, he has claimed that a protein found in milk may play a role in the etiology of autism. He is also the former president of the World Autism Organization.

In 2002, Shattock conducted a survey and claimed it identified a subset of autistic children who might be uniquely susceptible to harm from the MMR vaccine. These children were identified by the fact that they tended to experience bowel problems, had an abnormal gait and were friendlier than other autistic children. In addition, the survey found that one in 10 parents of autistic children attributed their child's autism to this vaccine, and that these children had much higher levels of urinary indolyl-3-acryloylglycine. However, Shattock was criticized by Peter Dukes of the Medical Research Council, who noted that Shattock's findings had yet to be published in a peer-reviewed journal.

In 2010, Shattock said he still believed it was possible that there was a causal link between the MMR vaccine and autism in a minority of cases, but that he had come to suspect organophosphates contained in pesticides were primarily responsible for the rise in autism diagnoses in the United Kingdom. Shattock also dismissed the conclusion of the General Medical Council that anti-vaccine activist Andrew Wakefield acted unethically while researching a link between the MMR vaccine and autism, claiming the regulatory body's findings were politically motivated.

It is scientific consensus that there is no link between any vaccine or vaccine ingredient and autism.

== Personal life ==
Shattock has a son, Jamie, who was diagnosed with autism in 1975.

In 1980 Shattock helped raise £80,000 to pay for the North East Autism Society (NEAS) centre at Thornhill Park, when he was known as "the Birdman".
