= Hilary Cass =

British paediatrician (born 1958)

The Right Honourable The Baroness Cass OBE, FRCP, FRCPCH
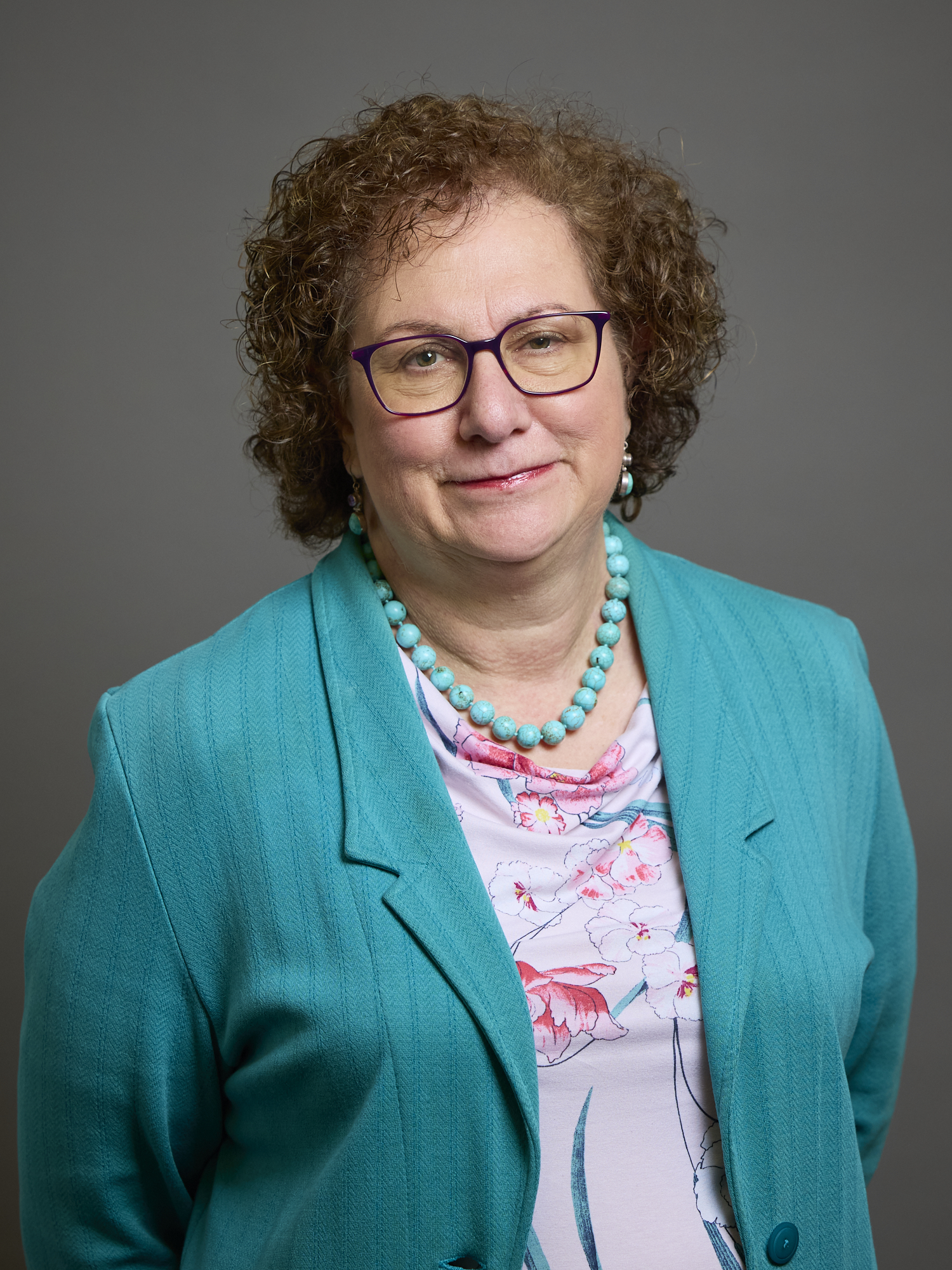
- Official portrait, 2025
- Born: 19 February 1958 (age 68); London, England
- Education: Royal Free Hospital Medical School
- Occupation: Paediatrician
- Known for: Founder of the UK's Rett Clinic for Children with Rett syndrome (1992); President of the Royal College of Paediatrics and Child Health (2012–2015); Cass Review (2024)
- Medical career
- Profession: Physician
- Field: Paediatric disability
- Institutions: Great Ormond Street Hospital; Evelina Hospital
- Research: Neurodevelopmental disorders

Member of the House of Lords
- Lord Temporal
- Life peerage 22 August 2024

Personal details
- Party: Crossbench

Hilary Dawn Cass, Baroness Cass (born 19 February 1958) is a British paediatrician. She was the chair of the British Academy of Childhood Disability, established the Rett Clinic for children with Rett syndrome, and has worked to develop palliative care for children. She led the Cass Review of gender identity services in England, which was completed in 2024. Cass was appointed to the House of Lords as a crossbench life peer in the same year.

Cass is a former president of the Royal College of Paediatrics and Child Health, and an honorary physician in paediatric disability at the Evelina Hospital, part of Guy's and St Thomas' NHS Foundation Trust. Prior to Cass's appointment at the Evelina Hospital, she had been consultant at Great Ormond Street Hospital for 15 years. Her research and interests have included autistic spectrum disorders, cognitive impairment due to epilepsy, children with visual loss, and care of children with multiple disabilities.

== Early life, education and qualifications ==
Hilary Dawn Cass was born on 19 February 1958 in London to Ralph and Mildred Cass. She attended the City of London School for Girls. Cass studied at the Royal Free Hospital Medical School, graduating with an MB BS medical degree in 1982 and a BSc in Paediatrics and Child Health.

Cass received her Fellowship of the Royal College of Physicians (FRCP) and is a Fellow of the Royal College of Paediatrics and Child Health (FRCPCH).

== Career ==
Cass spent her early medical career in a general practice training scheme, during which she changed to paediatrics. From 1992 to 2018, she was a consultant in neurodisability at three tertiary centres in the UK. Her research and interests have included autistic spectrum disorders, cognitive impairment due to epilepsy, children with visual loss, and care of children with multiple disabilities, particularly where there are difficulties with feeding and communication. In this field she has highlighted that medical innovations have resulted in a greater survival rate of children with severe incurable diseases, with the result that there are a greater number of children with severe disabilities.

=== Rett syndrome ===
In 1992 Cass founded the Rett clinic, a national outpatient service for children with the neurodevelopmental disorder Rett syndrome, based at the Evelina Hospital, part of Guy's and St Thomas' NHS Foundation Trust. She later reported that self-injurious behaviour in Rett syndrome had a prevalence of 73.8%.

=== Great Ormond Street Hospital ===
From 1994 to 2009, Cass was consultant in paediatric disability at Great Ormond Street Hospital (GOSH). There, she was appointed director of Postgraduate Medical Education and held the post of deputy medical director. During that 15-year period she also held some regional and national positions in medical education and policy development, including head of the London School of Paediatrics. At GOSH, she authored a book titled Snakes and Ladders, based on a programme she led that used role play to understand patient journeys in the NHS and to teach staff clinical governance skills. The book addresses communication between doctors and patients, and primary and secondary care. Other topics covered include informed consent, medical negligence, medical paternalism, randomised controlled trials, and unlicensed treatments.

In 2008, she published findings that did not support the opioid excess theory. She reported on a large study she led that found no difference in urinary opioid peptide levels between those with autism and control subjects, and concluded that "opioid peptides can neither serve as a biomedical marker for autism nor be employed to predict or monitor response to a casein- and gluten-free diet".

Cass left GOSH after raising concerns about patient safety at the hospital. The hospital denied that she quit over patient safety concerns.

=== Evelina Hospital ===
Cass joined the Evelina Hospital as consultant in 2009. There, she developed palliative care services for children.

=== Cass Review ===
In September 2020, Cass was appointed to lead the independent Cass Review for the NHS into gender identity services for children and young people. The interim report of the Cass Review was published in March 2022. It said that the rise in referrals had led to the staff being overwhelmed, and recommended the creation of a network of regional hubs to provide care and support to young people. The report noted that the clinical approach used by the Gender Identity Development Service (GIDS) "has not been subjected to some of the usual control measures" typically applied with new treatments, and raised concerns about the lack of data collection by GIDS. The recommendations resulted in the closure of GIDS. The final report was published on 10 April 2024, but was later criticised for the quality of the research it commissioned and incongruencies between the findings of the report and the consequential recommendations made.

Cass said after the publication of the review that she had received 'vile' emails and that she was not travelling by public transport after receiving security advice. She also said that she would not participate in the forthcoming review of adult gender clinics.

In May 2024, she made her first US media interview, on WBUR-FM's On Point, whom she told "The evidence was disappointingly poor". Cass also responded to WPATH's criticism about prioritising non-medical care, saying the review did not take a position about which is best. Cass hoped that "every young person who walks through the door should be included in some kind of proper research protocol" and for those "where there is a clear, clinical view" that the medical pathway is best will still receive that, and be followed up to eliminate the "black hole of not knowing what's best". On the allegation that the review was predicated on the belief that a trans outcome for a child was the worst outcome, Cass emphasised that a medical pathway, with lifetime implications and treatment, required caution but "it's really important to say that a cis outcome and a trans outcome have equal value".

In an interview with The New York Times in May 2024, Cass said that US doctors were 'out of date' on gender care. However, she also expressed concern that her review was being weaponized to suggest that trans people do not exist, saying "that's really disappointing to me that that happens, because that's absolutely not what we're saying." She also clarified that her review was not about defining what trans means or rolling back health care, stating "There are young people who absolutely benefit from a medical pathway, and we need to make sure that those young people have access — under a research protocol, because we need to improve the research — but not assume that that's the right pathway for everyone."

In September 2025, the Northern Ireland Health Minister, Mike Nesbitt, announced that Cass had accepted an invitation to conduct a review of Northern Ireland's gender services. The assessment will also consider proposed reforms to unify Northern Ireland's adolescent and adult services into a single continuous model of care. The review is expected to begin in November 2025.

== Other roles ==
In 2012, Cass was appointed president of the Royal College of Paediatrics and Child Health for a three-year tenure. Between 2017 and 2020, she was chair of the British Academy of Childhood Disability. She is a trustee of Noah's Ark Children's Hospice, and was formerly chair of the charity Together for Short Lives.

== Honours and awards ==
Cass was appointed an Officer of the Order of the British Empire (OBE) in the 2015 New Year Honours for services to child health. In the same year, she was awarded as Honorary Fellow of the Royal College of Nursing (FRCN(hon)), and in 2016 as Honorary Fellow of the Royal College of General Practitioners (FRCP(Hon)).

In the 2024 Dissolution Honours, Cass was nominated for a life peerage as a crossbencher. She was created Baroness Cass, of Barnet in Greater London, on 22 August 2024.

== Personal life ==
Cass is Jewish and signed an open letter after the 7 October 2023 attack on Israel affirming her "Jewish values", including endorsing the existence of the State of Israel and a two-state solution for the Israeli–Palestinian conflict.

== Selected publications ==
=== Papers ===
- Mount, Rebecca H.; Charman, Tony; Hastings, Richard P.; Reilly, Sheena; Cass, Hilary (November 2002). "The Rett Syndrome Behaviour Questionnaire (RSBQ): refining the behavioural phenotype of Rett syndrome". Journal of Child Psychology and Psychiatry, and Allied Disciplines. 43 (8): 1099–1110. doi:10.1111/1469-7610.00236. ISSN 0021-9630. PMID 12455930.
- Cass, Hilary; Reilly, Sheena; Owen, Lucy; Wisbeach, Alison; Weekes, Lyn; Slonims, Vicky; Wigram, Tony; Charman, Tony (May 2003). "Findings from a multidisciplinary clinical case series of females with Rett syndrome". Developmental Medicine and Child Neurology. 45 (5): 325–337. doi:10.1017/s0012162203000616 (inactive 17 July 2025). ISSN 0012-1622. PMID 12729147.
- Baird, Gillian; Cass, Hilary; Slonims, Vicky (28 August 2003). "Diagnosis of autism". BMJ. 327 (7413): 488–493. doi:10.1136/bmj.327.7413.488. ISSN 0959-8138. PMC 188387. PMID 12946972.
- Cass, H.; Sekaran, D.; Baird, G. (September 2006). "Medical investigation of children with autistic spectrum disorders". Child: Care, Health and Development. 32 (5): 521–533. doi:10.1111/j.1365-2214.2006.00630.x. ISSN 0305-1862. PMID 16919131.
- Cass, H.; Gringras, P.; March, J.; McKendrick, I.; O'Hare, A. E.; Owen, L.; Pollin, C. (September 2008). "Absence of urinary opioid peptides in children with autism". Archives of Disease in Childhood. 93 (9): 745–750. doi:10.1136/adc.2006.114389. ISSN 1468-2044. PMID 18337276.
- Cass, Hilary; Barclay, Sarah; Gerada, Clare; Lumsden, Daniel E.; Sritharan, Kaji (February 2020). "Complexity and challenge in paediatrics: a roadmap for supporting clinical staff and families". Archives of Disease in Childhood. 105 (2): 109–114. doi:10.1136/archdischild-2018-315818. ISSN 1468-2044. PMID 31186292.

=== Books ===
- Cass, Hilary (2006). The NHS Experience: The "snakes and Ladders" Guide for Patients and Professionals. Routledge. ISBN 0-415-33671-6.

== Bibliography ==
- Craft, Alan; Dodd, Keith (2017). From an Association to a Royal College: The History of the British Paediatric Association and Royal College of Paediatrics and Child Health 1988-2016. Switzerland: Springer. ISBN 978-3-319-43582-4.

Professional and academic associations
Preceded by Terence Stephenson	President of the Royal College of Paediatrics and Child Health; 2012−2015	Succeeded by Neena Modi
