= Cass Review =

Review of gender identity services in England

Logo of the Cass Review

The Independent Review of Gender Identity Services for Children and Young People (commonly referred to as the Cass Review) is an independent review commissioned in 2020 by NHS England and NHS Improvement and led by Hilary Cass, a retired consultant paediatrician and the former president of the Royal College of Paediatrics and Child Health. It dealt with gender services for children and young people, including transgender youth and those with gender dysphoria in England. The final report was published on 10 April 2024.

The review concluded that more research was needed and that the evidence base and rationale for early puberty suppression was unclear. The review led to a UK ban on prescribing puberty blockers to treat minors with gender dysphoria (with the exception of existing patients, those in a clinical trial, and those on puberty blockers for other reasons).

The review made 32 recommendations across all aspects of service provision, which were welcomed by UK medical organisations such as the British Psychological Society and the Royal College of Psychiatrists, though some such as the British Association of Gender Identity Specialists criticised the review or parts of the review. Following high-profile media coverage, Cass expressed concern that misinformation about the review had spread online and elsewhere.

Medical organisations outside the UK, international medical organisations, and other countries' clinical practice guidelines have criticised its methodology, findings, and recommendations.

The review was endorsed by both the Conservative and Labour parties, although LGBT+ Labour criticised it. The Green Party initially supported the review, but pulled their statement following condemnation from LGBTQ members. LGBTQ advocacy groups in the UK and internationally have criticised the review.

== Background ==
The number of referrals to GIDS, by sex assigned at birth, through different financial years.

- assigned female at birth
- assigned male at birth
- Not stated

The Gender Identity Development Service (GIDS) was the specialist clinic nationally commissioned by NHS England to provide care to transgender and gender diverse children, including those with gender dysphoria. In the years leading up to the Cass Review, several GIDS staff members voiced concerns over the evidence base for the treatments being given and the extent of prior assessment. At the same time, professional disagreements over the strength of evidence for treatments provided to children and young people, such as puberty blockers, was growing. The case of Bell v Tavistock also explored issues of informed consent. Several systematic reviews had found the evidence base supporting these treatments to be poor, and European countries such as Finland and Sweden had limited the use of puberty blockers and other hormone treatments for this patient cohort, citing a lack of evidence supporting their use. In January 2021, the Care Quality Commission (CQC) gave GIDS an "inadequate" rating (the lowest possible). These issues led to GIDS becoming controversial and gaining extensive news coverage.

The median waiting time (in days) for GIDS patients' first appointments, by sex assigned at birth, through different financial years.

- assigned female at birth
- assigned male at birth

The Cass Review was commissioned by NHS England in September 2020, following a significant increase in referrals to GIDS (Note: Between 2009–10 and 2019–20, the number of referrals increased from 77 to more than 2,700.) and a shift in the service from a psychosocial and psychotherapeutic model to one that included hormone treatment. (Note: Over time, the service adopted international standards from the Dutch Protocol and the WPATH and the Endocrine Society guidelines.) (Note: "Before 2011, Gids would give puberty blockers to children only once they had turned 16. But as gender clinics around the world began providing blockers to those who had just begun puberty, reports grew of UK children going overseas to buy the drugs. And in 2011, a medical study was approved through which younger children could access these drugs...In 2014, despite the patchwork of information about the study – which was still running – a change in Gids' policy was approved by NHS England: children with gender dysphoria, who were just beginning puberty, could now be eligible for blockers.") Hilary Cass, a former president of the Royal College of Paediatrics and Child Health (RCPCH), was asked by NHS England and NHS Improvement's Quality and Innovation Committee to chair an independent review with the aim of improving gender identity services for children and young people. The Cass Review's final report stated the concerns which led to its creation included very long waiting lists, of over two years per patient; an "exponential" increase in the number of children and young people requesting gender-affirming care from the NHS; a change towards earlier medical treatment in this patient cohort; (Note: According to Cass: "In 2011, a study began to evaluate the impact of administering puberty blockers to younger children. By 2014, when the study had just finished recruiting its final participants, GIDS lowered the age at which young people could be referred for treatment with blockers from 16 to those in the early stages of puberty. There was no lower age limit as such, but it meant in some instances that children of nine or 10 could now be eligible to be referred for this medical intervention.") and concerns that there was insufficient evidence to justify the treatments being given. (Note: Between 2019 and 2020, issues were raised about services and the evidence base for treatments in reports by the Royal College of General Practitioners (RCGP), an NHS England Policy Working Group, and the National Institute for Health and Care Excellence (NICE).)

== Methodology ==
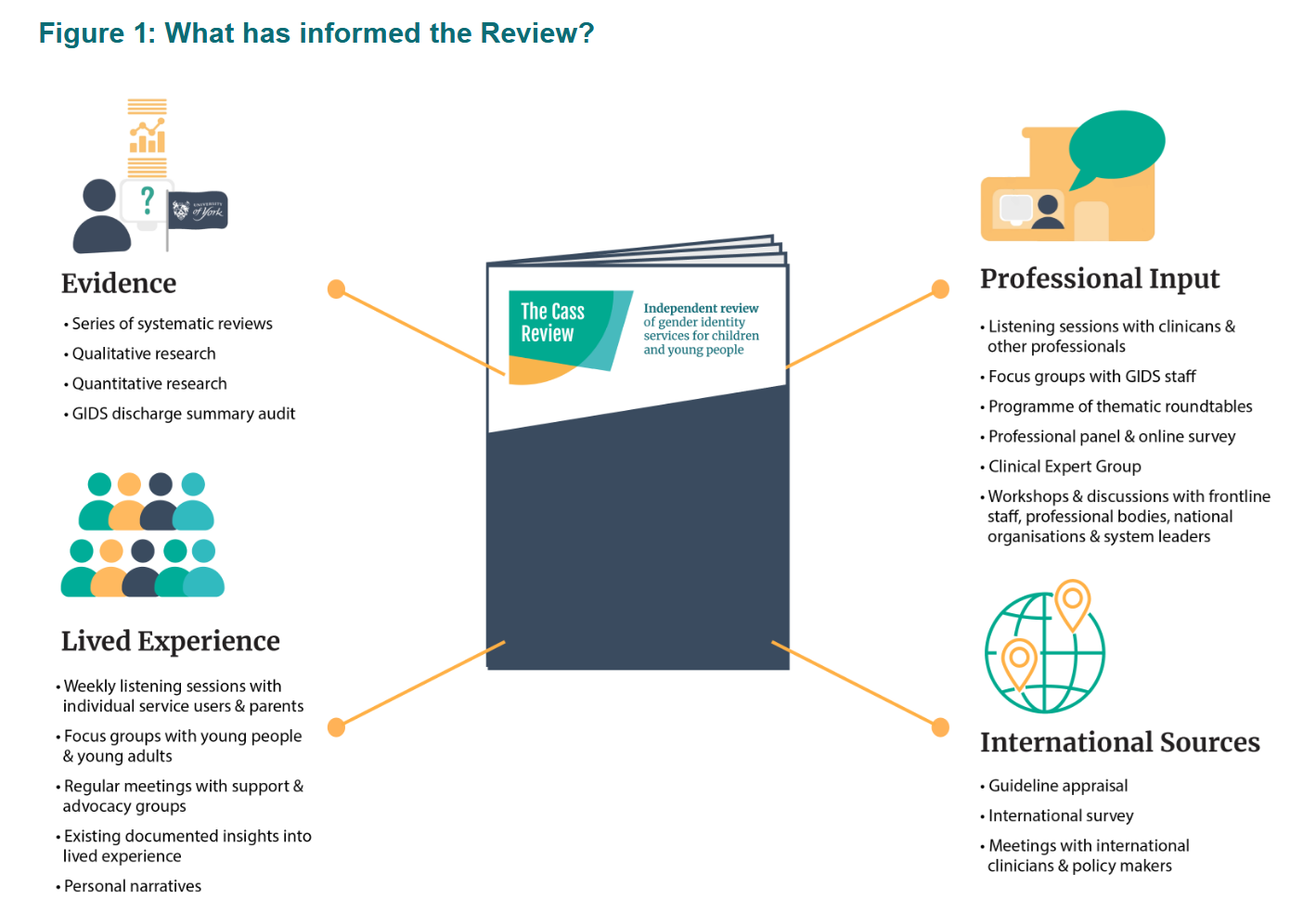
Cass Review Figure 1 and 4: What has informed the Review?

The Cass Review was an independent review which made policy recommendations for services offered to children and young people questioning their gender identity or experiencing gender incongruence in the NHS in England. Dr Hilary Cass chaired the review and authored its recommendations and reports, independently of any medical bodies or consensus-building process. An assurance group was appointed, but was not involved in the preparation of recommendations. No external review or prior consultation was performed before publishing. An advisory board was also established, but the composition and contributions of the group are not documented.

The Cass Review commissioned several independent systematic reviews from the University of York's Centre for Reviews and Dissemination (CRD), (Note: The Centre for Reviews and Dissemination (CRD) is one of three bodies funded by the National Institute for Health and Care Research (NIHR) to provide a systematic review service to the NHS. According to the review's final report, following an open national procurement process, the CRD was commissioned to produce the systematic reviews to build upon previous findings by NICE and provide the best possible evidence for the review to use to determine its findings.) which were published in Archives of Disease in Childhood. Whether the research questions were decided by CRD researchers or the Cass Review is unclear.

The systematic reviews covered:

- Characteristics of children and adolescents referred to specialist gender services
- Impact of social transition in relation to gender for children and adolescents
- Psychosocial support interventions for children and adolescents experiencing gender dysphoria or incongruence
- Interventions to suppress puberty in adolescents experiencing gender dysphoria or incongruence (puberty blockers)
- Masculinising and feminising hormone interventions for adolescents experiencing gender dysphoria or incongruence (transgender hormone therapy)
- Care pathways of children and adolescents referred to specialist gender services
- Clinical guidelines for children and adolescents experiencing gender dysphoria or incongruence

The systematic reviews assessed the quality of studies using the Mixed Methods Appraisal Tool (Note: The systematic reviews of puberty blockers and gender-affirming hormones assessed the quality of relevant studies using a modified version of the Newcastle–Ottawa scale. They made their findings based on all studies found to be of high and moderate quality and discarded those found to be of low quality. The systematic review of psychosocial interventions assessed study quality using the Mixed Methods Appraisal Tool, and included all studies in its analysis regardless of quality. It found, of the suitable studies, nine were of low quality and one was of moderate quality. It used a narrative approach to the synthesis of the findings of the studies due to the high variety of the studies found.) and a modified version of the Newcastle–Ottawa scale. They examined English-language studies of minors, (Note: The systematic reviews considered studies of patients up to 18 years old, although young adults up to 30 were included in the qualitative research to discuss their prior experiences.) and did not produce certainty-of-evidence ratings for individual outcomes. Additionally, focus group interviews with patients, clinicians, and a review of previous treatment courses for children and adolescents with gender incongruity in the NHS were conducted.

== Interim report ==
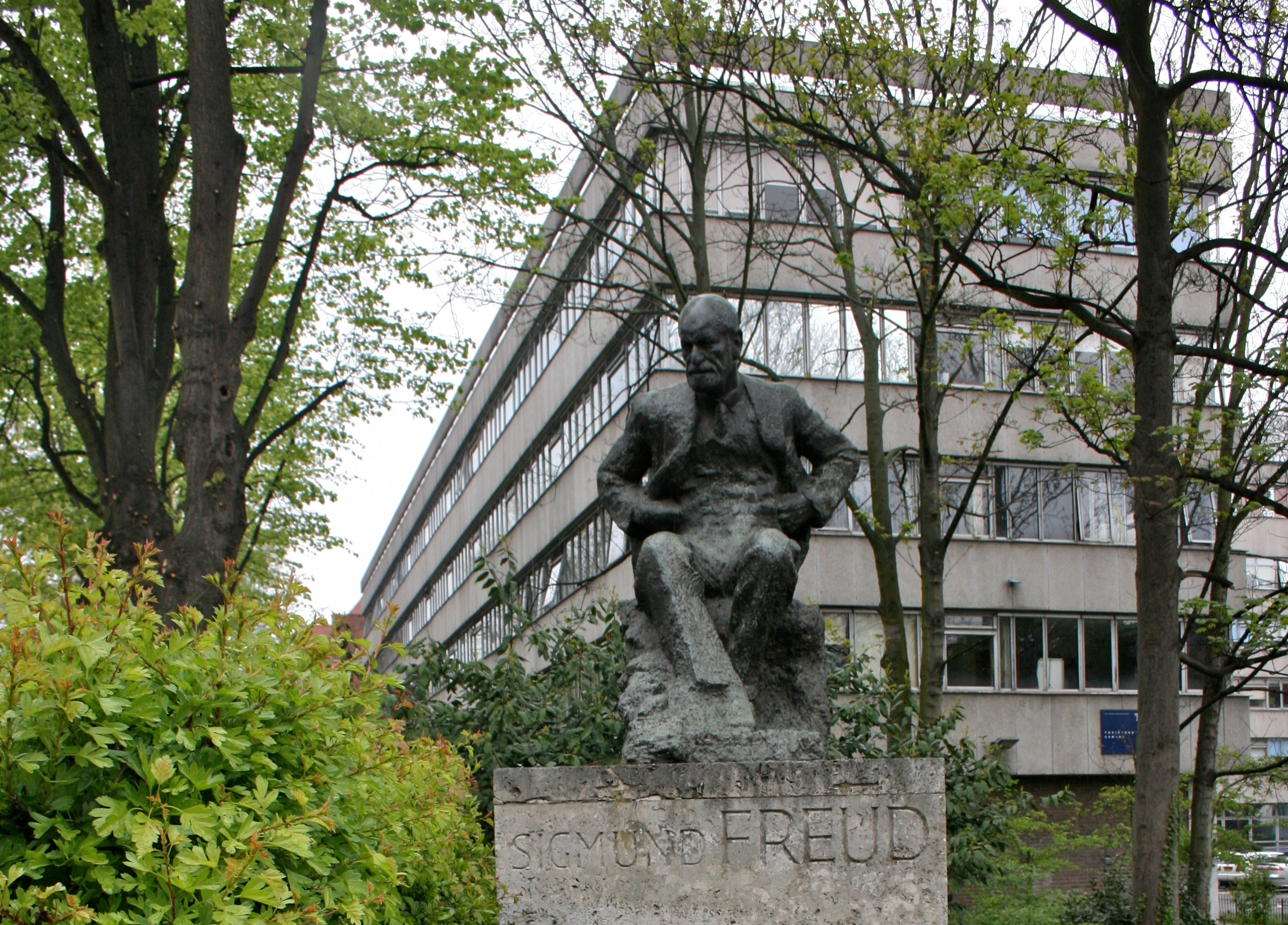
A statue of Sigmund Freud in front of the Tavistock Centre, at which the GIDS was based.

The interim report of the Cass Review was published without peer-review in March 2022. It said the rise in referrals had led to staff being overwhelmed, and recommended the creation of a network of regional hubs to provide care and support to young people. The report said the clinical approach used by the Gender Identity Development Service (GIDS) "has not been subjected to some of the usual control measures" typically applied with new treatments, and raised concerns about the lack of data collection by GIDS. Only 200 of 2,500 children referred to GIDS received endocrine treatment, and there was insufficient detail provided about their broader needs.

The report said that while the GIDS approach to hormone interventions was initially based on the Dutch protocol, there were "significant differences" in the current NHS approach. For example, the report said there were no clear guidelines for when to provide psychological support before or instead of medical treatment, endocrinologists administering puberty blockers did not attend multidisciplinary meetings, and there was insufficient capacity to increase (or even maintain) appointments once adolescents received puberty blockers.

The interim report said GPs and other non-GIDS staff felt "under pressure to adopt an unquestioning affirmative approach" to children unsure of their gender. The report also said that diagnosis of gender-related distress sometimes led to "diagnostic overshadowing", where comorbidities such as poor mental health – which were usually managed by local services – were overlooked. The report suggested that long wait times to access GIDS had resulted in increased distress for patients and their families, as well as less time for exploration – since patients arrived having already begun social transition and with expectations of a rapid assessment process. In response, the Tavistock and Portman NHS Foundation Trust said "being respectful of someone's identity does not preclude exploration", and that it agreed "support should be holistic, based on the best available evidence" without making assumptions about "the right outcome for any given young person".

The interim report further said there were "gaps in the evidence" over the use of puberty blockers. A public consultation was held and a further review of evidence by NICE said there was "not enough evidence to support the safety or clinical effectiveness of puberty suppressing hormones to make the treatment routinely available at this time". Subsequently, NHS England stopped prescribing them to children.

In April 2022, Health Secretary Sajid Javid told MPs that services in this area were too affirmative and narrow, and "bordering on ideological". In November 2022, the World Professional Association for Transgender Health (WPATH) – along with regional groups ASIAPATH, EPATH, PATHA, and USPATH – issued a statement criticising the NHS England interim service specifications based on the interim report, stating it was based on outdated assumptions about transgender children and adolescents, that it relied on outdated or questionable studies on rates of persistence, and challenging the endorsement of psychotherapeutic gatekeeping on the grounds that "the denial of gender-affirming treatment under the guise of 'exploratory therapy'" was "tantamount to 'conversion' or 'reparative' therapy".

== Final report ==
The final report of the Cass Review was published on 10 April 2024, alongside a series of systematic reviews and a survey carried out by the University of York, encompassing the patient cohort, service pathways, international guidelines, social transitioning, puberty blockers, hormone treatments, and psychosocial treatments.

=== Findings ===
==== Lack of research in the field ====
The number of studies in different quality categories on the subjects of the systematic reviews
- puberty blockers
- youth hormone therapy
- social transitioning
- psychosocial intervention

The report states that the existing evidence for both endocrine (puberty blockers and hormone therapy) and non-endocrine treatments (psychosocial interventions) in children and adolescents with gender incongruence is weak. (Note: On medical treatments: "When the Review started, the evidence base, particularly in relation to the use of puberty blockers and masculinising or feminising hormones, had already been shown to be weak"; and that after the examination of over 100 pieces of potential evidence, that "there continues to be a lack of high-quality evidence in this area". On psychosocial treatments: "A problem, that has become increasingly apparent as the Review has progressed is that research on psychosocial interventions and longer-term outcomes for those who do not access endocrine pathways is as weak as research on endocrine treatment. This leaves a major gap in our knowledge about how best to support and help the growing population of young people with gender-related distress in the context of complex presentations.)

==== Increase in referrals ====
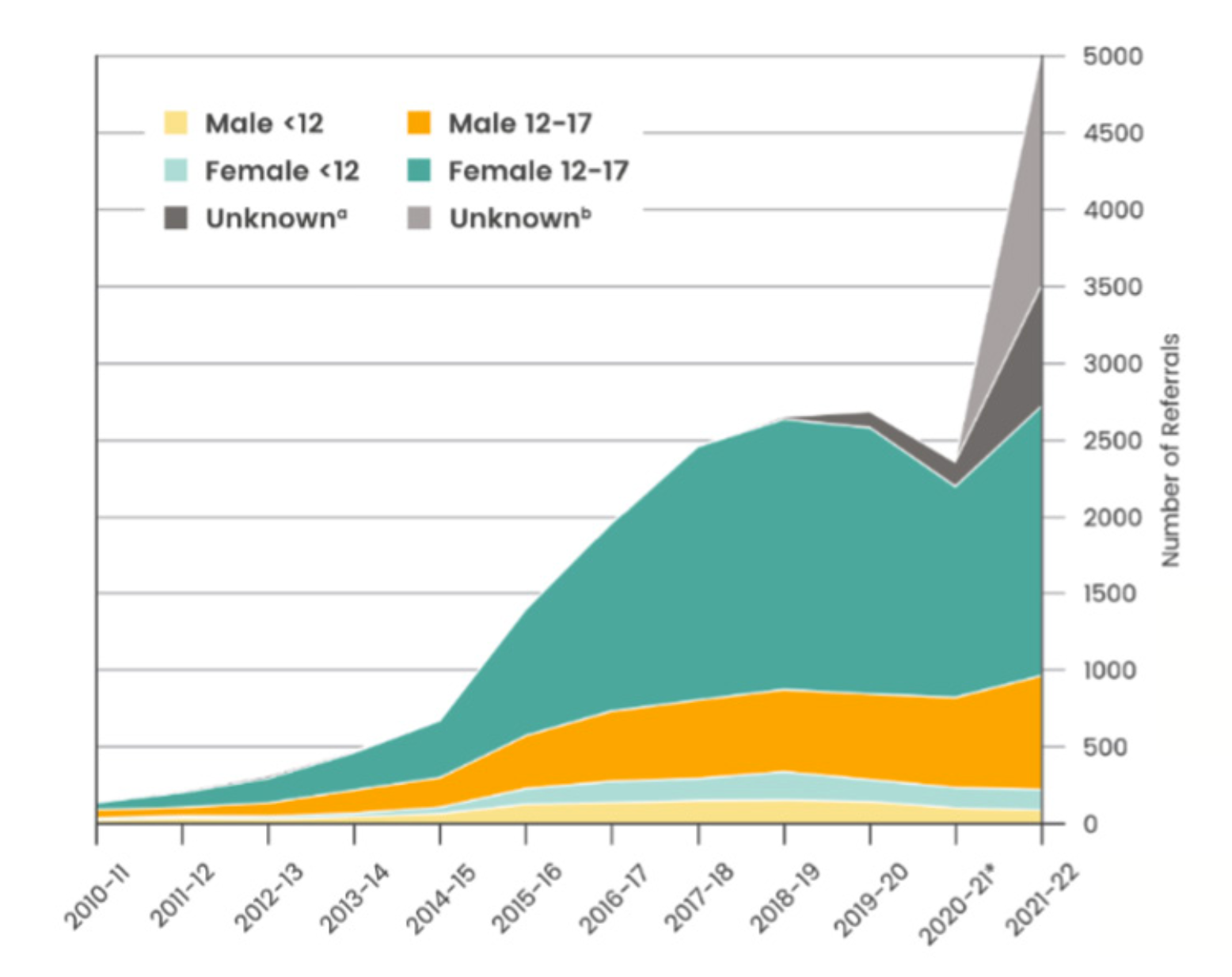
Cass Review Figure 11: Child and Adolescent Referrals for Gender Dysphoria (UK, GIDS)

The report found no clear explanation for the rise in the number of children and adolescents with gender dysphoria, but said there was broad agreement for attribution to a mix of biological and psychosocial factors. The report suggested that factors such as a lower threshold for medical treatment, social media-related mental health consequences, abuse, access to information regarding gender dysphoria, struggles with emerging sexual orientation, and early exposure to online pornography may have contributed to the increase in numbers. The report considered rising acceptance of transgender identities insufficient to explain the increase on its own.

==== Social transition ====
A systematic review evaluated 11 studies assessing the outcomes of social transition in minors using a modified version of the Newcastle–Ottawa scale; it rated nine as low quality and two as moderate quality. The report said that insufficient evidence was available to assess whether social transition in childhood has positive or negative effects on mental health, and that there was weak evidence for efficacy in adolescence. It also said that sex of rearing seems to influence gender identity, and suggested that early social transition may "change the trajectory" of gender identity development in children.

The report said that although social transition was not usually seen as a treatment, it should be considered an "active intervention". It suggested taking "a more cautious approach" for social transition for children than for adolescents, and said pre-pubertal children undergoing social transition should be seen "as early as possible" by an experienced clinician.

==== Puberty blockers ====
The report said the evidence base and rationale for early puberty suppression remains unclear, with unknown effects on cognitive and psychosexual development. A systematic review examined 50 studies on the use of puberty blockers using a modified version of the Newcastle–Ottawa scale and rated one as high quality, 25 as moderate quality, and 24 as low quality. The review concluded that the lack of evidence means no conclusions can be made regarding the impact on gender dysphoria and mental health, but did find evidence of bone health being compromised during treatment. The report suggested puberty blockers did not provide children and young people with "time to think", since nearly all patients who went on blockers later proceeded with hormone therapy. For youth assigned male at birth, the report stated that blockers taken too early can make a later penile inversion vaginoplasty more difficult due to insufficient penile growth. The report said one of the benefits of puberty blockers is preventing irreversible changes such as a lower voice and facial hair.

==== Youth hormone therapy ====
The report said many unknowns remained for the use of hormone treatment among under-18s, with poor long-term follow-up data and outcome information on those starting younger. A systematic review evaluated 53 studies on transgender hormone therapy using a modified version of the Newcastle–Ottawa scale, and rated one study as high quality, 33 as moderate quality and 19 as low quality. Overall, the review found some evidence that hormone treatment improved psychological outcomes after 12 months, but found insufficient evidence regarding physical benefits and risks. The report said hormone therapy should be available from 16 years old, but that there should be a "clear clinical rationale" for the prescription of hormone therapy for anyone under 18.

==== Psychosocial intervention ====
A systematic review assessed ten studies on the efficacy of psychosocial support interventions in transgender minors using the Mixed Methods Appraisal Tool, and rated one as medium quality and nine as low quality. The review said that no robust conclusions could be made and more research was needed.

The report said the evidence for psychosocial interventions was "as weak as research on endocrine treatment". It recommended that psychosocial interventions also form part of a research programme, along with endocrine interventions.

==== Clinical pathways ====
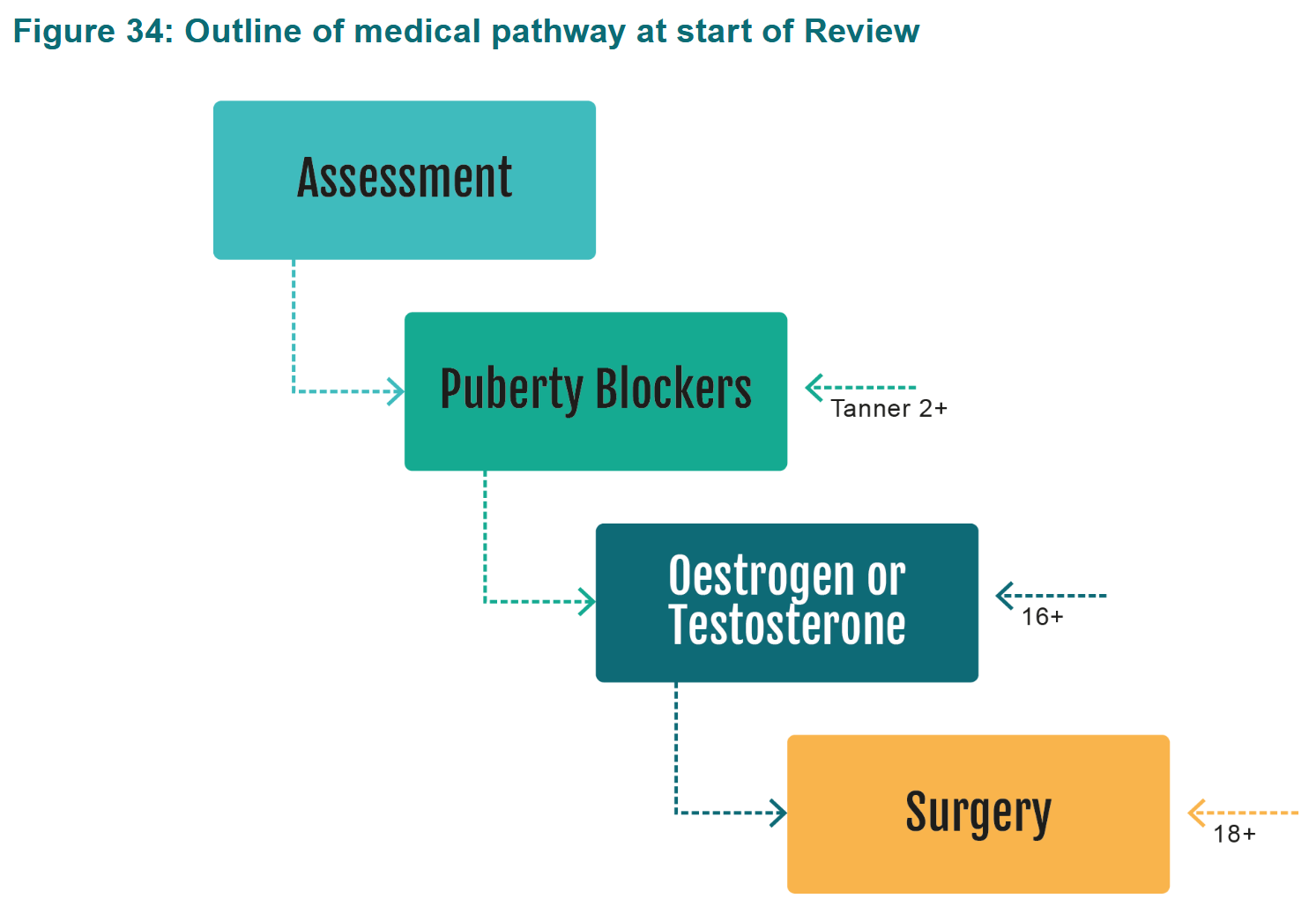
Cass Review Figure 34: Outline of medical pathway at start of Review

The report said that clinicians could not be certain which children and young people would have an enduring trans identity in adulthood, and that for most, a medical pathway would not be the most appropriate. When a medical pathway was clinically indicated, wider mental health or psychosocial issues should also be addressed. Due to a lack of follow-up, the number of individuals who detransitioned after hormone treatment was unknown.

The Cass Review attempted to work with the Gender Identity Development Service and the NHS adult gender services to "fill some of the gaps in follow-up data for the approximately 9,000 young people who have been through GIDS to develop a stronger evidence base". According to the review, "the necessary cooperation was not forthcoming", despite encouragement from NHS England.

==== International guidelines ====
Appraisal scores for international guidelines produced by one of the systematic reviews, included in the Cass Review's final report
| Guideline ID | Scope and purpose | Stakeholder involvement | Rigour of development | Clarity of presentation | Applicability | Editorial independence |
|---|---|---|---|---|---|---|
| AACAP 2012 | 65 | 39 | 44 | 63 | 7 | 31 |
| American Academy of Paediatrics 2018 | 70 | 26 | 12 | 30 | 6 | 69 |
| American Psychological Association 2015 | 74 | 74 | 24 | 50 | 18 | 14 |
| Council for Choices in Healthcare Finland 2020 | 91 | 69 | 51 | 72 | 56 | 0 |
| de Vries 2006 | 63 | 31 | 10 | 74 | 17 | 6 |
| Endocrine Society 2009 | 65 | 33 | 44 | 70 | 22 | 31 |
| Endocrine Society 2017 | 63 | 33 | 42 | 72 | 21 | 92 |
| European Society for Sexual Medicine 2020 | 63 | 52 | 39 | 70 | 7 | 58 |
| Fisher 2014 | 65 | 20 | 12 | 35 | 17 | 44 |
| Health Policy Project 2015 | 63 | 63 | 16 | 24 | 33 | 6 |
| Norwegian Directorate of Health 2020 | 76 | 81 | 30 | 57 | 47 | 17 |
| Oliphant 2018 | 44 | 39 | 12 | 33 | 21 | 0 |
| Pan American Health Organisation 2014 | 52 | 44 | 13 | 31 | 21 | 0 |
| Royal Children's Hospital Melbourne 2018 | 81 | 59 | 19 | 41 | 19 | 14 |
| Society for Adolescent Health and Medicine 2020 | 41 | 24 | 17 | 41 | 7 | 0 |
| South African HIV Clinicians Society 2021 | 59 | 59 | 21 | 43 | 24 | 69 |
| Strang 2018 | 87 | 31 | 18 | 37 | 15 | 19 |
| Swedish National Board of Health & Welfare 2022 | 91 | 87 | 71 | 83 | 25 | 36 |
| UCSF 2016 | 70 | 41 | 23 | 37 | 26 | 0 |
| WPATH 2012 | 85 | 61 | 26 | 56 | 17 | 17 |
| WPATH 2022 | 83 | 63 | 35 | 56 | 24 | 39 |

A systematic review assessed 23 regional, national and international guidelines covering key areas of practice, such as care principles, assessment methods and medical interventions. The review said most guidelines lacked editorial independence and developmental rigour, and were nearly all influenced by the 2009 Endocrine Society guideline and the 2012 WPATH guideline, which were themselves closely linked. The Cass review questioned the guidelines' reliability, and concluded that no single international guideline regarding transgender care could be applied in its entirety to NHS England.

==== Conflicting clinical views ====
The report said there were conflicting views among clinicians regarding appropriate treatment. It suggested that disputes over language such as "exploratory" and "affirmative" approaches meant it was difficult to establish neutral terminology. Some clinicians avoided working with gender-questioning young people. The report said some professionals were concerned about being accused of conversion therapy, and were likewise concerned about the impact of legislation to ban conversion therapy.

=== Recommendations ===
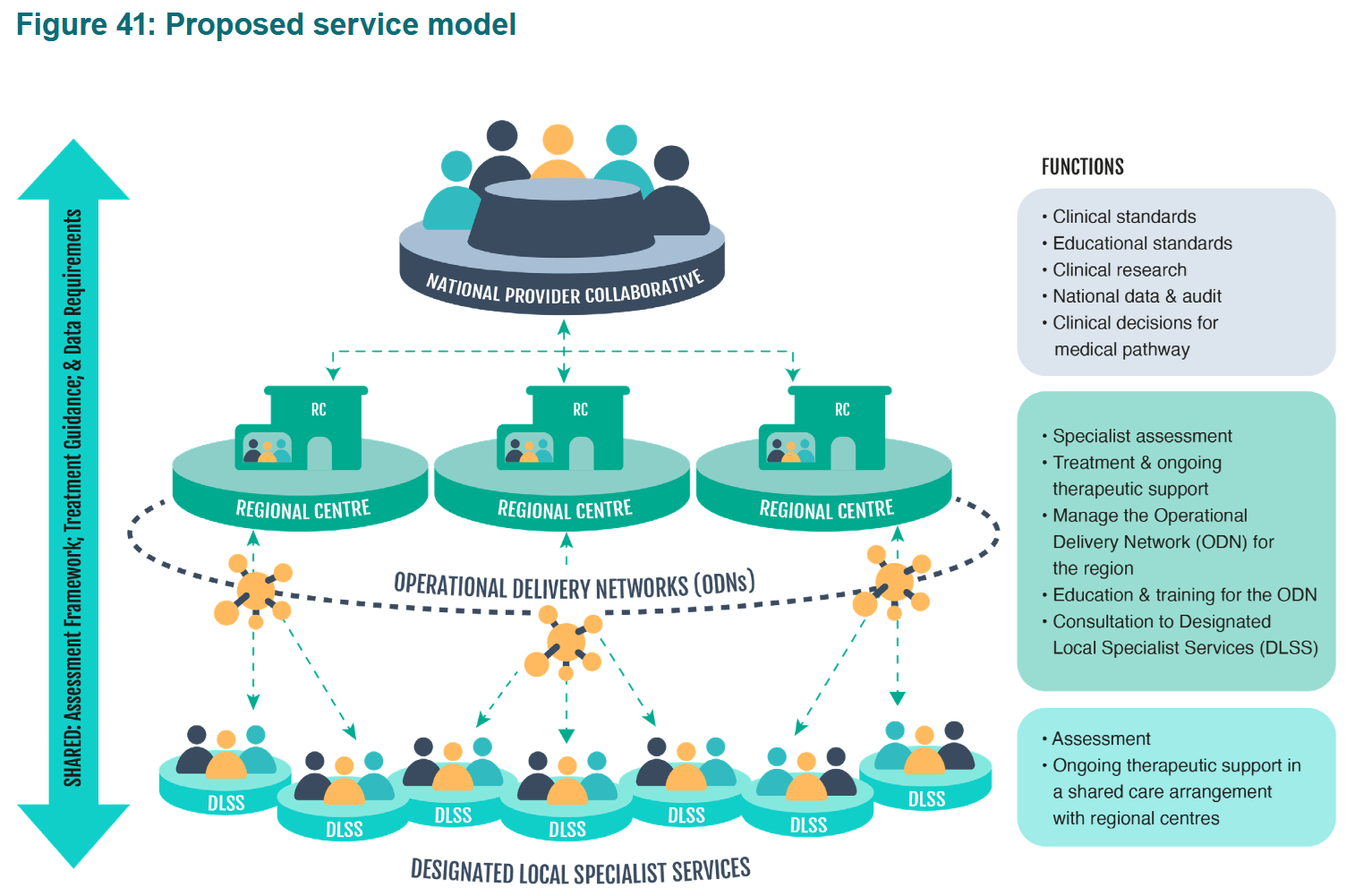
Cass Review Figure 41: Proposed service model

The report made 32 recommendations covering areas including assessment of children and young people, diagnosis, psychological interventions, social transition, improving the evidence base underpinning medical and non-medical interventions, puberty blockers and hormone treatments, service improvements, education and training, clinical pathways, detransition and private provision.

Recommendations included:

- Care provision:
  - Services should have a designated medical practitioner with personal responsibility for the safety of children receiving care.
  - Patients should have individualised care plans, including mental health assessments and screening for neurodivergent conditions such as autism.
  - Services should offer standard psychological and pharmacological treatments for co-occurring conditions like anxiety and depression.
  - Children and families considering social transition should be seen as soon as possible by a relevant clinical professional.
  - Longstanding gender dysphoria must be a prerequisite for medical transition, but is not the only criteria in deciding whether to allow a transition.
  - Services should provide a clear clinical rationale when prescribing masculinising/feminising hormone therapy below the age of 18, and should not provide masculinising/feminising hormone therapy below the age of 16.
  - Every case considered for medical transition must be discussed by a national multi-disciplinary team.
  - All minors should be offered fertility counselling and preservation prior to embarking upon a medical pathway.
  - A separate pathway should be established for the treatment of pre-pubertal children, who are ideally to be treated as early as possible.
- Changing how the NHS provides care:
  - A regional network of centres should be developed, providing continuity of care for 17–25 year olds.
  - The DHSC should direct NHS gender clinics to participate in the data linkage study, with the resulting research being overseen by NHS England's Research Oversight Board.
  - A multi-site service network should be developed as soon as possible, and the National Provider Collaborative to oversee the multi-disciplinary team should be established without delay.
  - To increase the available workforce, joint contracts should be used for health providers across a wide array of NHS services; and requirements for gender services should be built into the workforce planning for adolescent health services.
  - NHS England should develop a formal training program and competency framework for gender services, including a module on the holistic mental assessment framework.
  - Similar changes should be considered for adult gender services over the age of 25.
  - NHS England should "ensure there is provision for people considering detransition", which may require separate services.
  - The DHSC and NHS England should consider the implications of private healthcare on any future requests by patients for treatment under the NHS.
  - The DHSC should work to define the dispensing responsibilities of pharmacists receiving private prescriptions, and work to halt the sourcing of endocrine medications obtained through prescriptions acquired in Europe.
- Future research:
  - A full program of research should be established to carefully study the characteristics, interventions, and outcomes of every person seen by NHS gender services.
  - A central evidence and data resource for gender services should be established, with specifically defined datasets for both local and national services.
  - National infrastructure should be put in place to manage continual data collection on gender services, including through the ages of 17 to 25.
  - A unified research strategy should be established to ensure the most meaningful data and numbers are collected.
  - A living systematic review over all of this research should be collected.
  - The NHS should establish requirements for the collection of data from patients of NHS gender services.

== Implementation by NHS England ==
NHS England responded positively to the interim and final reports. As of April 2024 they have implemented a number of measures. In response to the interim report, in March 2024 NHS England announced that it would no longer prescribe puberty blockers to minors outside of use in clinical research trials, citing insufficient evidence of safety or clinical effectiveness. GIDS closed in March 2024, being replaced by the new NHS Children and Young People's Gender Services. Two new services, located in the north-west of England and in London, opened in April 2024, and are intended to be the first of up to eight regional services. These will follow a new service specification for the "assessment, diagnosis and treatment of children and young people presenting with gender incongruence". Puberty suppressing hormones are no longer routinely available in NHS youth gender services. New patients that have been assessed as possibly benefiting from them will be required to participate in a clinical trial that is being set up by the National Institute for Health and Care Research. A new board, chaired by Simon Wessely will encourage further research in the areas highlighted in the review as having a weak evidence base.

On August 7, 2024, NHS England announced a status update for young people being considered for referral to specialist gender services, including the publication of a new pathway specification. Referrals will only be accepted from an NHS-commissioned paediatric or children's mental health service instead of general practitioners and other professionals, and those considering social transition should be seen quickly by a clinical professional with relevant experience. NHS England will also "explore the issues around a detransition pathway by October 2024".

In April 2025, James Palmer, NHS England's national medical director for specialised services, said the NHS had not issued any new prescriptions of gender affirming hormones to minors in the year since the report's publication, even though they have not been banned, with the NHS instead prioritising "holistic care". Palmer said these new services only have 30 referrals per month, compared to 5,000 per year at GIDS. One paediatric mental health expert said this was due to the increased complexity of the new referral process and families seeking treatment elsewhere – such as by acquiring hormones on the black market or abroad.

The clinical trial on puberty blockers for children and young people, due to start in late 2024, was delayed to 2025. The NHS has commissioned the clinical trial, called "Pathways", to run until 2031, at the cost of £10.7 million. The study will be led by Emily Simonoff, a senior professor of child and adolescent psychiatry at King's College London, and will consist of four parts. With the consent of their parents and clinicians, children enrolled in one arm of the trial will receive puberty blockers alongside continued psychosocial support. They will have their physical, social and emotional well-being monitored over the span of two years, including regular brain scans to track whether puberty blockers impact their brain development. Other arms will monitor the well-being of children attending new NHS gender clinics who do not receive puberty blockers. The researchers will also record children's experiences of living with gender dysphoria and the care they receive, as well as the opinions of parents and staff. Cass welcomed the news, saying the trial "aims to fill some of the gaps in our knowledge about the outcomes of different interventions".

== Reception within the United Kingdom ==
=== Response from UK political parties and public bodies ===
Conservative Prime Minister at the time Rishi Sunak said that the findings "shine a spotlight" on the need for a cautious approach to child and adolescent gender care. In their manifesto for the 2024 United Kingdom general election, the Conservatives promised to implement the Cass Review recommendations.

Wes Streeting, the Labour shadow Health Secretary at the time, welcomed the final report, saying it was "a watershed moment for the NHS's gender identity services". Both Streeting and then Shadow Home Secretary Yvette Cooper said Labour would implement the report's recommendations in full. In its statement, LGBT+ Labour urged their party to "exercise caution in responding to the review", saying that while it got things right, it had "received credible criticism from trans advocacy groups and researchers".

In April 2024, the Green Party of England and Wales released a statement supporting the review. This was withdrawn an hour later, after LGBTIQA+ Greens threatened to remove support for their party's leaders. The withdrawal was criticised by gender-critical members.

The Equality and Human Rights Commission, a non-departmental public body, described the Cass Review as a "vital milestone" and called for all service providers to fully implement its recommendations.

=== Response from devolved governments ===
The Scottish Government said it would "take the time to consider the findings" of the review. Humza Yousaf, First Minister of Scotland and Scottish National Party (SNP) leader at the time, said the review would be given "utmost consideration", that "all recommendations" made by it would be considered, and that decisions on changes to treatments as a result of the review would be made by clinicians rather than politicians.

The Scottish Greens, then a part of the Scottish Government, criticised the review at its initial publication. Patrick Harvie, co-leader of the Scottish Greens, said he'd seen "far too many criticisms" of the review for him to say it was a "valid scientific document". Harvie's comments were controversial and widely criticised, and the resulting tension with the SNP has been cited as a factor in the collapse of the Bute House Agreement.

The Welsh Senedd initially voted against a motion tabled by the Welsh Conservatives Shadow Social Justice Minister to accept the findings of the Cass Review in full. Subsequently, the Senedd voted unanimously to pass an amended motion noting "NHS England has concluded there is not enough evidence to support the safety or clinical effectiveness of puberty suppressing hormones for the treatment of gender dysphoria in children and young people" and "the Welsh Government will continue to develop the transgender guidance for schools taking account of the Cass review and stakeholder views".

Citing the Cass Review findings, in August 2024 the Northern Ireland Executive agreed to the extension of the ban on the private sale and supply of puberty blockers to Northern Ireland. This was supported by all parties in the Executive at the time apart from the Alliance Party.

=== Response from health bodies in the United Kingdom ===
In April 2024, the British Psychological Society (BPS) said they supported "the report's primary focus of expanding service capacity across the country" and acknowledged that "while psychological therapies will continue to have an incredibly important role to play in the new services, more needs to be done to assess the effectiveness of these psychological interventions." BPS president Roman Raczka said the review was "thorough and sensitive", and welcomed the recommendation for a consortium of relevant bodies to develop better trainings and upskill the workforce. Rob Agnew, chair of the BPS's Sexualities Section, described it as "bad news for our trans youth" and said it was "out of step with better quality, more comprehensive reviews".

The Royal College of Psychiatrists (RCP) welcomed the report. They supported the emphasis on a holistic and person-centred approach and research to improve the evidence basis for treatment protocols. They said that some of its trans members, and the wider trans community, had concerns about availability of treatments while awaiting research, said there was "a strong view that the report makes assumptions in areas such as social transition and possible explanations for the increase in the numbers of people who have a trans or gender diverse identity, which contrasts with the more decisive statements about treatment approaches", and called for direct and comprehensive involvement of those with lived experience.

The Royal College of Paediatrics and Child Health (RCPCH) said they would take the time to review the recommendations in full and said that data collected had identified a lack of confidence by paediatricians and GPs to support this patient group, which the RCPCH pledged to address by developing new training. In August 2024, the RCPCH acknowledged there had been some academic criticism of the Cass Review and a call to pause the implementation of recommendations, but that "pausing the implementation of the Cass report recommendations would be a backwards step for Gender Identity Services, as this will again delay care and therefore risks causing further harm to this patient population". They stated they were engaged with NHS England and as a part of this would "encourage NHSE to consider emerging criticisms of any chosen approach, as would be the case in the delivery of any other children's health service".

In July 2024, the Royal College of General Practitioners updated its position statement on the role of the GP in transgender care in response to the Cass Review. They advise that, for patients under 18, GPs should not prescribe puberty blockers outside of clinical trials, and the prescription of gender-affirming hormones should be left to specialists. The RCGP says it will fully implement the Cass Review recommendations. They specifically highlight recommendations for continuity of care for 17–25 year olds, and the need for additional services for those people considering detransition.

In 2024, the governing council of the British Medical Association (BMA), which represents 190,000 doctors, passed the motion calling for the organisation to "publicly critique" the Cass Review. After a backlash from members, the BMA council voted to instead maintain a neutral position until the completion of its own evaluation of the Cass Review. Their evaluation was published in May 2026. It found the methodology of the Cass Review to be sound and denied that they opposed any of the review's recommendations. However, the BMA also criticized some details about the government's implementation of the review's recommendations, particularly the delays in setting up the new NHS services and the puberty blockers trial. The BMA also opposed the ban on puberty blockers, calling it "government overreach" and said "NHS doctors should still be allowed to prescribe puberty blockers" when they deem it necessary. They also raised concerns that Cass's team had not engaged with transgender advocacy groups until "late in the process" and did not feel fully represented in the report.

The Academy of Medical Royal Colleges (AoMRC) released a statement in August 2024 in support of the report's recommendations, stating that "further speculative work risks greater polarisation", and that "our focus should be on implementing the recommendations of the Cass Review".

==== Response from LGBTQ health bodies in the UK ====
In April 2024, the British Association of Gender Identity Specialists (BAGIS) published a brief statement saying it was "deeply troubled by some of the content of the Cass Review and the potential impact thereof", and that it would be "offering a comprehensive response" at an unspecified future date. In December 2024, BAGIS also said it was "dismayed" to see the Department for Health and Social Care's "indefinite ban" on puberty blockers for under-18s, stating: "The Cass Review finds that puberty blockers have clearly defined benefits in narrow circumstances, which is inconsistent with a legislative ban".

In July 2024, the UK's Association of LGBTQ+ Doctors and Dentists (GLADD) criticised the British Medical Journal's coverage of the Cass Review, stating that some recommendations could be beneficial while others could create new barriers to care for transgender youth. It also criticised "The weaponisation of the Cass review against trans people" by political parties and campaigners. In October, GLADD released an official response to the review, stating they were broadly supportive of its recommendations but were "concerned with what we believe to be an ingrained bias against the autonomy of trans people throughout the narrative text" which had also been noted by others. Of the 32 recommendations of the Cass Review, GLADD supported 15, and said that it could support a further 14 with provisos, could not support two, and was neutral on one. GLADD also said the Cass Review "may implicitly pathologise trans and non-binary identities" or "perpetuate stigmatisation of this population", including in its discussions of social transition, the suggestion that gendered toy preference is biologically deterministic, and the language used regarding masculinising/feminising hormones as a negative or undesirable outcome.

=== Hilary Cass's response ===
In an interview given the week after the release of the final report, Cass described receiving abusive emails and said she was given security advice to avoid public transport. She said that "disinformation" had frequently been spread online about the report. Cass said deliberate attempts "to undermine a report that has looked at the evidence of children's healthcare" were "unforgivable" and put children at risk. There were widespread misleading claims from critics of the report that it had dismissed 98% of the studies it collected and all studies which were not double-blind experiments. Cass described these claims as being "completely incorrect". Although only 2% of the papers collected were considered to be of high quality, 60% of the papers, including those considered to be of moderate quality, were considered in the report's evidence synthesis. Cass criticised Labour MP Dawn Butler for repeating inaccurate claims that the review had dismissed more than 100 studies during a debate in the House of Commons. After talking with Cass, Butler used a point of order to admit her mistake and correct the record in Parliament, stating the figure came from a briefing she had received from Stonewall.

In a May 2024 interview with The New York Times, Hilary Cass said:

I think there is an appreciation that we are not about closing down health care for children. But there is fearfulness — about health care being shut down, and also about the report being weaponized to suggest that trans people don't exist. And that's really disappointing to me that that happens, because that's absolutely not what we're saying.

She also said that the review was not about defining what trans means or rolling back healthcare, stating: "There are young people who absolutely benefit from a medical pathway, and we need to make sure that those young people have access – under a research protocol, because we need to improve the research – but not assume that that's the right pathway for everyone."

In a May 2024 interview with WBUR-FM, Cass responded to WPATH's criticism about prioritising non-medical care, saying the review did not take a position about which is best. Cass hoped that "every young person who walks through the door should be included in some kind of proper research protocol" and for those "where there is a clear, clinical view" that the medical pathway is best will still receive that, and be followed up to eliminate the "black hole of not knowing what's best". Responding to claims that the review assumed a trans outcome was the worst outcome for a child, Cass emphasised that a medical pathway, with lifetime implications and treatment, required caution but "it's really important to say that a cis outcome and a trans outcome have equal value".

In June 2026, in the midst of a pressure campaign by some politicians calling for the proposed clinical trial into puberty blockers to be scrapped, Cass said in an interview with BBC that she believes that since her review was published, the risks about puberty blockers had been "exaggerated" and that "we genuinely don't know if there are harms" and that a clinical trial was "essential" to figure out "whether these drugs are helpful or not".

== Global medical reception ==
Professional organisations and transgender health providers have widely criticised the review's findings.

=== Global health bodies ===
The Endocrine Society responded to the report by reaffirming their support for gender-affirming care for minors and saying that their current policies supporting such treatments are "grounded in evidence and science". The Endocrine Society said the review "does not contain any new research that would contradict the recommendations made in our Clinical Practice Guideline on gender-affirming care" and concluded "Banning evidence-based medical care based on misinformation takes away the ability of parents and patients to make informed decisions."

The World Professional Association for Transgender Health (WPATH) released an email statement saying the report is "rooted in the false premise that non-medical alternatives to care will result in less adolescent distress" and further criticised recommendations which "severely restrict access to physical healthcare, and focus almost exclusively on mental healthcare for a population which the World Health Organization does not regard as inherently mentally ill". An official statement expanded on these concerns, saying Hilary Cass had "negligible prior knowledge or clinical experience" and that "the (research and consensus-based) evidence" suggests medical treatments such as puberty blockers and hormone therapy were "helpful and often life-saving". It questioned the provision of puberty blockers only in the context of a research protocol: "The use of a randomized blinded control group, which would lead to the highest quality of evidence, is ethically not feasible."

International transgender healthcare bodies, other international organisations, researchers, and politicians have also criticised the recommendation that children and young people accessing puberty blockers should be required to sign up to a research trial.

=== Australia ===
The Royal Australian and New Zealand College of Psychiatrists (RANZCP) rejected calls for an inquiry into trans healthcare following the release of the Cass Review, characterising it as one review among several in the field. They emphasised that, "assessment and treatment should be patient centred, evidence-informed and responsive to and supportive of the child or young person's needs and that psychiatrists have a responsibility to counter stigma and discrimination directed towards trans and gender diverse people."

A joint statement by Equality Australia, signed by the Australian Professional Association for Trans Health (AusPATH) and PATHA among others, said the review "downplays the risk of denying treatment to young people with gender dysphoria and limits their options by placing restrictions on their access to care".

=== New Zealand ===
The Professional Association for Transgender Health Aotearoa (PATHA), a New Zealand professional organisation, said the Cass Review made "harmful recommendations" and was not in line with international consensus. It suggested that "Restricting access to social transition is restricting gender expression, a natural part of human diversity". It also said trans or non-binary people were not included in the Cass Review's planning and decision-making – including clinicians experienced with affirmative care – while several people involved in the review had "previously advocated for bans on gender-affirming care" in the U.S., and had "promoted non-affirming 'gender exploratory therapy', which is considered a conversion practice". PATHA criticised the exclusion of those with clinical and lived experience of gender-affirming care from "its decision-making, conclusions, or findings" and the exclusion of trans people from the review's Governance Assurance Group "on the basis of potential bias".

In November 2024, the New Zealand Ministry of Health under a right-wing National Party-led coalition government released an evidence brief informed by the Cass Review and an accompanying position statement on the use of puberty blockers. The brief stated that there were "significant limitations in the quality of evidence for either the benefits or risks (or lack thereof) of the use of puberty blockers". The ministry urged a more precautionary approach, starting from a holistic assessment incorporating social and mental health factors, and involving clinicians experienced in gender-affirming care as part of an interprofessional team. A consultation on safety measures for the use of puberty blockers in young people with gender-related health needs closed in January 2025.

On 19 November 2025, the Ministry of Health announced a ban on puberty blockers for minors with gender dysphoria set to take effect on 19 December 2025. Minors with gender dysphoria already on puberty blockers will be able to continue them and the drug will also remain available for other uses like early onset puberty. Brown cited the Cass Review in his decision and said the ban will remain in place until the completion of the United Kingdom's clinical trial on puberty blockers. The ban was strongly condemned by the Royal Australian and New Zealand College of Psychiatrists (RANZCP), the Professional Association for Transgender Health Aotearoa (PATHA) and multiple other doctors in New Zealand. The ban was also condemned by the opposition centre-left Labour Party as well as members of the Green Party.

On 21 October 2026, the High Court ruled that the Government's 2025 regulations banning new puberty blocker prescriptions for children and young people with gender dysphoria were unlawful. The ruling was welcomed by PATHA president Jennifer Shields and vice president Dr Elizabeth McElrea, who said that moves to restrict transgender rights were "rooted in disinformation" and that decisions about this healthcare were best made by patients and their doctors. By contrast, Family First New Zealand chief executive Bob McCoskrie condemned the High Court and accused them of siding with activists over vulnerable children. Similarly, New Zealand First leader Winston Peters called on the Health Minister to appeal the High Court ruling. A spokesperson for the Health Minister said the Government was committed to introducing new safeguards for puberty blockers while ensuring that patients with medical needs could still access healthcare.

=== Canada ===
The Canadian Paediatric Society responded that "Current evidence shows puberty blockers to be safe when used appropriately, and they remain an option to be considered within a wider view of the patient's mental and psychosocial health." Members of the Canadian Paediatric Society's Adolescent Health Committee stated "there are significant limitations, biases, and inaccuracies within the Review", that "the Review has been noted to include incorrect citations of evidence and inaccurate, sometimes scientifically disproven speculations", and concluded "The Cass Review is a critique, authored by a single individual, presenting a perspective on current practices in a particular context, and it will inform care. It does not, however, purport to be 'the new international standard of care', and it should not be treated as such."

=== Germany, Austria, and Switzerland ===
In 2025 a collaboration of Germany, Austria, and Switzerland, led by the Association of the Scientific Medical Societies in Germany, produced new clinical practice guidelines on transgender healthcare which criticised the Cass Review's methodology, conclusions, and lack of transparency. The guidelines stated there are "no proven effective treatment alternative without body-modifying medical measures for a [person with] permanently persistent gender incongruence" and criticised the potentially harmful recommendation of psychotherapy for distress related to gender dysphoria as no studies in the review showed a reduction in dysphoria through psychotherapy. It further criticised the Cass Review's lack of involvement from medical professional societies, its "assurance group" being explicitly uninvolved in the development of recommendations, and the presence of an "advisory board" whose composition and contributions weren't documented.

=== Japan ===
In August 2024, the Japanese Society of Psychiatry and Neurology published updated guidelines on the treatment of gender dysphoria. The guidelines considered the Cass Review, describing it as specific to the unique situation in the UK, noted criticism of the Cass Review by other international organisations, and stated that the WPATH SOC8 considered more systematic reviews. The guidelines further said it is "self-evident" that, unless puberty is suppressed, development of sex characteristics are irreversible in people who were assigned male at birth. The society stated they will continue to track and recommend prescriptions of puberty blockers in Japan to minors and expand to tracking discontinuations and switches to hormone therapy.

=== Netherlands ===
The Amsterdam University Medical Center said it agrees with the goals of reducing wait times and improving research, but disagrees that the research-base for puberty blockers is insufficient, stating that puberty blockers have been used in trans care for decades. It stated they did not consider it ethical to mandate youth who desire puberty blockers to be registered in research trials, that it was worrying that after closing GIDS youth seeking trans healthcare were deprived of care, and that it "regrets that this situation arose for patients in England".

In 2026, a two-year review resulting in updated clinical practice regulations for gender care in The Netherlands found that the Cass Review was not applicable to the Dutch health system, and instead recommended the administration of puberty blockers in those for whom puberty had not already begun.

=== Poland ===
A Polish Framework guidelines for the process of caring for the health of adolescent transgender (T) and non-binary (NB) people experiencing gender dysphoria was released in 2024 which said the Cass Review "caused a stir in public opinion and immediate harsh criticism from the medical and patient communities worldwide" and criticised Cass being chosen for her lack of experience in trans healthcare. It stated "the common thread of many objections to the Cass report is the multifaceted downplaying of the importance of the voices of adolescents and their families, clinical practice, the scientific knowledge base, and national and global recommendations, while misleading the public that a complete lack of clinical experience in a given field is a guarantee of reliability."

=== United States ===
The American Academy of Pediatrics responded to the report by reaffirming its support for gender-affirming care for minors and saying that their current policies supporting such treatments are "grounded in evidence and science". The American Psychological Association stated that they were studying the Cass report but "stand by" their position statement in support of gender-affirming care.

In May 2025, the United States Department of Health and Human Services under President Donald Trump released a report on youth gender-affirming care in compliance with a January executive order forbidding the government from supporting gender transitions under 19. The report, which has been criticized for advocating conversion therapy and spreading misinformation about gender-affirming care, was co-authored by Zhenya Abbrusseze, the co-founder of the anti-trans non-profit Society for Evidence-Based Gender Medicine, and expressed support for the Cass Review and its findings. The report cited it extensively, calling it the "most comprehensive" and "most influential" evaluation of youth gender affirming care to date.

== Reception by academics and researchers ==
Some academics in the UK agreed with the Cass Review's findings stating a lack of evidence; others, both in the UK and internationally, disagreed with the report's methodology and findings.

Several scholars and organisations have criticised the Cass Review's conclusions and the evidence base used to support them. Researchers Cal Horton and Ruth Pearce have said of the Cass Review, "its most controversial recommendations are based on prejudice rather than evidence". Horton criticised the Interim Report and other documents for prioritising research on aetiology of trans identities, saying: "Research into the causation of trans identities has a pathologized history, running parallel to efforts to prevent or cure transness." Horton also criticised the Interim Report's support of exploratory therapy and its use of the terminology of "desistance".

Various scholars also criticised the emphasis on high and moderate quality evidence, saying that paediatric care often relies on low quality evidence in other areas; that in downgrading qualitative research, the patient voice was minimised; and that the highest quality evidence (such as from randomised controlled trials) may be difficult or unethical to obtain in this area.

Academics have also criticised unsupported claims that social transition and puberty blockers may "change the trajectory of psychosexual and gender identity development" and that youth who transition may lose the opportunity to experience adulthood as a gender they don't identify with.

In September 2024, a commentary was published in Journal of Adolescent Health arguing that other scholars had made "lengthy and nuanced rebuttals to the Cass report". The commentary says that Cass's conclusions generally focus on "limiting or minimizing medical gender-affirming care (GAC) for youth" and that she "minimizes the robust data and the potential negative impact of increasing barriers for an already disenfranchised group". The commentary states that "GAC for youth is well supported by evidence" and that concerns about the evidence base and the need for more research "do not warrant removal of access to this important care". The commentary further suggests that randomised controlled trials (RCT) would not be ethically feasible for young people experiencing gender dysphoria.

In November 2024, over 200 educational psychologists signed an open letter addressed to education secretary Bridget Phillipson. The letter expressed concerns about the "processes and findings of the Cass review" and the impact of the Cass Review on children and young people in education. That same month, the healthcare division of the RAND Corporation (a US-based research institute), released its own systematic review into treatments for trans and gender expansive young people, in which it described several similarities and differences between its own approach and that of the Cass Review. (Note: According to the report: "The systematic reviews conducted for the Cass Review used similar methods to our work, with some variations—for example, the reviews were restricted to studies with participants age 18 and younger, excluded case studies and non-English studies, used different risk-of-bias assessment tools, excluded studies meeting less than 50 percent of bias assessment criteria from syntheses in the hormonal intervention reviews, and did not provide certainty-of-evidence ratings for outcomes (Taylor, Mitchell, Hall, Langton, et al., 2024; Taylor, Mitchell, Hall, Heathcote, et al., 2024).") The report rated the existing evidence base as having low and very low certainty, but also found the treatments to be low risk and with little evidence of side-effects, regret, or dissatisfaction. (Note: According to the report: "Our review found that the available evidence suggests low risks of harmful outcomes from gender-affirming interventions, such as regret, dissatisfaction, side effects, or complications. Potential harms, such as bone health and fertility effects of hormonal interventions, warrant ongoing clinical and research attention because of the very low certainty of evidence available, as well as limited evidence for adjunctive interventions that mitigate those harms (e.g., fertility preservation). Nevertheless, these interventions have not shown the serious risks of harm that would suggest the need for policies to restrict the interventions. The low regret rate—though again based on very low certainty of evidence—is consistent with a meta-analysis (Bustos et al., 2021), primarily of adult literature, that found that regret rates were under 2 percent for gender-affirming surgery (i.e., the most intensive TGE-affirming intervention). That finding continues to be replicated (e.g., Bruce et al., 2023). By comparison, a systematic review that explored a variety of other surgical procedures unrelated to gender dysphoria (Wilson, Ronnekleiv-Kelly, and Pawlik, 2017) found an average regret rate of 14 percent.") It said the Cass Review was "highly comprehensive", but said its findings may have limited applicability outside the context of the NHS. (Note: According to the report: "As one example, the Cass Review did not include evidence for gender-affirming surgery because the National Health Service had already restricted that intervention to individuals age 18 or older. In contrast, we sought to provide evidence summaries that practice and policy decisionmakers could more broadly consider across diverse contexts.")

On 9 May 2025 a critical evaluation of the Cass report and its seven commissioned reviews was published in BMC Medical Research Methodology. Using an independent Risk of Bias (ROBIS) tool, the evaluation identified a "high risk of bias" in all seven reviews as well as "methodological flaws", "unsubstantiated claims", and "misrepresentation of evidence".

=== Yale Law School Integrity Project ===
In July 2024, The Integrity Project at Yale Law School released a white paper which said the Cass Review had "serious flaws". The white paper, co-authored by a group of eight legal scholars and medical researchers, suggests that the Cass Review "levies unsupported assertions about gender identity, gender dysphoria, standard practices, and safety of gender-affirming medical treatments, and it repeats claims that have been disproved by sound evidence". It concluded that the review "is not an authoritative guideline or standard of care, nor is it an accurate restatement of the available medical evidence on the treatment of gender dysphoria".

The white paper criticised the review's recruitment for focus groups, which included individuals who were not clinicians and who had unclear expertise, and said that the review "is not an accurate restatement of the available medical evidence on the treatment of gender dysphoria". In reference to one question, where a third of respondents agreed with the statement "There is no such thing as a trans child", the authors write: "Denying the existence of transgender people of any age is an invalid professional viewpoint. The involvement of those with such extreme viewpoints is a deeply concerning move for a document that issues recommendations on clinical care." The Yale Integrity Project white paper suggested that what the Cass Review referred to as the "exponential change in referrals" to youth gender services was not actually exponential, and that the recorded growth could be the result of double counting data points. Further, the paper criticises the Cass Review for suggesting that "peer and socio-cultural influence" are driving the increase in referrals, a claim which originates from a single article that has been heavily corrected for numerous well-documented fatal flaws. The Cass Review also suggested that the provision of gender-affirming care appeared "rushed, careless, and common", though its data showed waiting times for assessment were over two years and only 27% of patients seen during the review were referred to endocrinology for consideration of medical intervention. The Yale Integrity Project also criticised the review's discussions of evidence quality, since it introduces the GRADE approach and uses its terminology but does not evaluate evidence using the GRADE framework, and "takes the unusual step of elevating its own assessment of evidence quality above the considerations that guideline developers value".

== Reception by advocacy organisations ==
Amnesty International criticised "sensationalised coverage" of the review, stating it was "being weaponised by people who revel in spreading disinformation and myths about healthcare for trans young people".

In June 2024, the European Society for Child and Adolescent Psychiatry (ESCAP) issued a statement which referred to the Cass Review systematic reviews along with previous reviews conducted in the UK, Sweden, Finland and Germany which also found a lack of evidence for the safety or efficacy of puberty blockers and cross-sex hormones to treat minors with gender dysphoria. ESCAP stated that "there is an urgent need to apply widely endorsed clinical, scientific, and ethical standards to the care of children and adolescents with gender dysphoria", called for healthcare providers "not to promote experimental and unnecessarily invasive treatments with unproven psycho-social effects", and insisted on the importance of "respect for all kinds of different views and attitudes" in professional debate.

In September 2024, in reference to the NHS's planned implementation of this recommendation that puberty blockers be restricted to clinical trials, as well as a similar protocol in Sweden, a thematic report prepared by the Council of Europe Committee of Experts on Sexual Orientation, Gender Identity and Expression, and Sex Characteristics (ADI-SOGIESC) said: "There are ethical implications of only offering treatment to a small group of patients, potentially violating the fundamental ethical principles governing research ... as for many young people the only way to receive treatment is to participate in the trial, therefore calling into question whether consent can be constituted as free and informed in these situations".

=== LGBTQ organisations ===
The International Lesbian, Gay, Bisexual, Trans and Intersex Association (ILGA), international LGBTQ student organisation IGLYO, and Transgender Europe released a joint statement which criticised the Cass Review's "poor and inconsistent use of evidence, pathologising approaches, and exclusion of service users and trans healthcare experts". ILGA and Transgender Europe also raised concerns about "pathologizing approaches" and the use of language like "gender questioning" to refer to transgender youth.

Trans youth charity Mermaids and the LGBTQ+ charity Stonewall endorsed some of the report's recommendations, such as expanding service provisions with the new regional hubs, but raised concerns the review's recommendations may lead to barriers for transgender youth in accessing care.

In October 2024, 100 LGBTQ+ organisations and activists signed a letter to Wes Streeting expressing a "deep lack of confidence" in the Review. Concerns included Cass's selection without consideration of other candidates, "secrecy" regarding the report's commissioning, and "explicit exclusion of any trans people from involvement in the Governance Assurance Group, on the basis of potential bias". It described the review as "an absurd spectacle" with extensively documented technical failings and said, "There is a real concern, therefore, that the review promotes an inherently flawed approach to determining the efficacy and safety of clinical support for trans healthcare".

Trans advocates have criticised the Cass Review for its alleged connections with anti-trans activism. LGBTQ advocates specifically criticised meetings between Cass, members of her team, and members of Florida governor Ron DeSantis' medical board, which restricted transgender healthcare in Florida. Cass met with board member Patrick Hunter, a member of the Society for Evidence-Based Gender Medicine (SEGM) and Catholic Medical Association. Hunter and Cass exchanged materials and Cass was invited to present to the board.

=== Trade unions ===
In June 2024, the University and College Union's (UCU) national executive committee unanimously passed a motion criticising the review's methodology, sourcing and claims. (Note: The motion said the review has "serious methodological flaws", "provides no evidence for the 'new approach' it recommends", and is based on "selective use of evidence and promotion of unevidenced claims".) This was met with criticism from some academics and union members, who said the move "risks making the union appear anti-scientific". The UCU brought a version of the motion to the Trades Union Congress (TUC) LGBT+ conference, where it was carried without opposition.

=== Reception by gender-critical organisations ===
Gender-critical organisations including Sex Matters and Genspect welcomed the report. Stella O'Malley of Genspect said that if a conversion therapy ban were to criminalise any exploration into why a child identifies as trans, it "would ban the very therapy that Cass is saying should be prioritised".

== Subsequent government actions in the UK ==
=== Ban on puberty blockers ===
==== Private prescription ====
In May 2024, then Health Secretary Victoria Atkins implemented an emergency three-month ban on the prescription of puberty blockers by medical providers outside of the NHS. (Note: NHS England had already announced it would no longer prescribe puberty blockers to minors outside of clinical trials in March 2024.) It went into effect on 3 June 2024 and was set to expire on 3 September 2024. The ban restricted their use to those already taking them, or within a clinical trial. In July, this ban was challenged by campaign groups TransActual and the Good Law Project who brought a legal case arguing the ban was unlawful. On 29 July 2024, the High Court of Justice ruled that the ban was lawful.

The Health Secretary Wes Streeting welcomed the decision as "evidence led", and said efforts were being made to set up a clinical trial to "establish the evidence on puberty blockers". Following the ruling, TransActual announced they would not appeal the decision due to limited funds and the unlikelihood of an appeal being heard before the ban expires.

On 22 August 2024, the government extended the emergency ban until 26 November 2024. The ban was also extended to cover Northern Ireland, following agreement from the Northern Ireland Executive and came into effect on 27 August 2024. On 6 November 2024 the ban was extended again to 31 December 2024. On 11 December 2024, the ban was renewed indefinitely and is set to be reconsidered in 2027.

==== Commission on Human Medicines review ====
In January 2025, the Commission on Human Medicines (CHM) delivered a report on the proposed indefinite restriction of the use of puberty blockers for children and young people. The review stated that both "Baroness Cass and the independent CHM found that there is a lack of evidence for the efficacy of these medicines in the treatment of gender incongruence and/or gender dysphoria, and that there is currently an unsafe prescribing environment." The report recommended an indefinite ban until prescriptions could be deemed safe, with legislation to be reviewed in 2027. According to the report, the proposed ban was opposed by the Royal College of General Practitioners, the British Medical Association and the Royal College of Psychiatrists.

==== Proposed ban on cross-sex hormones ====
In May 2025, Government lawyers confirmed that Wes Streeting was "actively reviewing" a potential ban on prescription of cross-sex hormones to under-18s, with an expert panel due to deliver a report on the matter in July.

=== Adult clinics ===
The Cass Review did not cover adult care, but in April 2024, NHS England said it would also initiate a review of adult gender clinics. NHS England National Director of Specialised Commissioning John Stewart sent a letter to Cass stating that it would review the use of transgender hormone therapy in adults in a similar manner as was done for puberty blockers in the Cass Review.

In May 2024, Cass wrote to NHS England to pass on the feedback regarding adult care from clinicians who had approached her during the review process. Clinicians across the country in adult gender services had expressed concern about both the clinical practice and model of care. Some clinicians in other settings, especially general practice, had raised concerns about the treatment of patients under their care. On 7 August, NHS England included a response to the adult care letter in a status report for the under-18s services.

On 8 August, they stated the review of adult services would be led by Dr. David Levy, medical director for Lancashire and South Cumbria integrated care board, to assess "the quality (i.e. effectiveness, safety, and patient experience) and stability of each service, but also whether the existing service model is still appropriate for the patients it is caring for"; and that Dr. Levy would work with a group of "expert clinicians, patients and other key stakeholders, including representatives from the CQC, Royal Colleges and other professional bodies and will carefully consider experiences, feedback and outcomes from clinicians and patients, past and present". The first onsite visits are planned to start in September 2024. The findings will be used to support an updated adult gender service specification which will then be liable to engagement and public consultation. Unlike the Cass Review, the review of adult gender services is expected to be completed within months, rather than years.

In December 2024, it was reported that a number of GPs had begun refusing or withdrawing hormone treatment from adult trans patients, for reasons including insufficient funds, the Cass Review, and the Royal College of GPs' response to the Cass Review – despite the Cass Review only applying to youth services.

=== NHS Scotland ===
On 18 April 2024, NHS Scotland announced that it had paused prescribing puberty blockers to children referred by its specialist gender clinic. The chief medical officer of Scotland set up a multidisciplinary clinical team to assess how the Cass Review's 32 recommendations might be applied to NHS Scotland. Their Cass Review – implications for Scotland: findings report was published in July 2024 and found that the majority of recommendations were applicable to NHS Scotland to a varying degree, with some modification dealing with differences in the Scottish health service. They recommended that the use of puberty blockers be paused until clinical trials are begun. NHS Scotland will participate in the forthcoming UK study. That report was fully accepted by the Scottish government in September. Among the changes recommended are that the gender identity service for children and young people should be moved to a paediatric setting and more than one service offered across the regions. In common with other specialities, a referral to these services will now have to come from a clinician.

=== Department for Education ===
In May 2024, the UK government released a draft of new Relationships, Sex and Health Education (RSHE) guidelines. The guidelines would ban lessons on the "contested theory of gender identity" and emphasised that any instruction on transgender people must focus on the legality of transitioning and the fact one has to be 18 to legally change their gender. A press release accompanying the guidelines stated that "In light of the Cass Review, it is important that schools take a cautious approach to teaching about this sensitive topic and do not use any materials that present contested views as fact, including the view that gender is a spectrum."

=== Northern Ireland Review ===
In September 2025, Health Minister Mike Nesbitt announced that Cass had accepted an invitation to conduct a review of Northern Ireland's gender services. The assessment was also to consider proposed reforms to unify Northern Ireland's adolescent and adult services into a single continuous model of care. LGBTQ+ charity The Rainbow Project said it was "extremely concerned" at the health minister's appointment of Dr Hilary Cass. Chief Executive of the Rainbow Project Scott Cuthbertson said the Cass Review "led to the shuttering of services and the withdrawal of care for trans people across the UK, and supported a model which views transitioning as a negative outcome for patients" and that a Cass-led review will "worsen an already broken system". Cass visited Northern Ireland in November 2025, and the review was published in February 2026.

== See also ==
- Evidence-based medicine
- Time to Think
- Transgender health care
- Transgender rights in the United Kingdom
- LGBTQ rights in the United Kingdom
- Transgender history in the United Kingdom
