= Opioid excess theory =

Fringe autism causation theory

The opioid excess theory postulates that autism is the result of a metabolic disorder in which opioid peptides produced through metabolism of gluten and casein pass through an abnormally permeable intestinal membrane and then proceed to exert an effect on neurotransmission through binding with opioid receptors. Advocates of this hypothesis believe that autistic children are unusually sensitive to gluten, which results in small bowel inflammation in these children, which in turn allows these opioid peptides to enter the brain. However, mainstream reviews of existing studies have consistently determined there is insufficient evidence to validate the theory or prove that related alternative therapies have a measurable impact on core autistic traits.

== Early years ==
This hypothesis was first proposed by Jaak Panksepp in a 1979 paper, in which he speculated that autism might be "an emotional disturbance arising from an upset in the opiate systems in the brain". Kalle Reichelt then emerged as one of the leading advocates of this theory, publishing papers alleging that "the patterns of peptides and associated proteins from urinary samples [from people with autism] differ considerably from each other and from normal controls." In addition, Reichelt's research has concluded that autistic individuals have increased levels of these peptides in their cerebrospinal fluid. Additionally, in a 1991 paper, Reichelt argued that gluten and casein may play a causative role in autism, as the incomplete digestion thereof may produce certain opioid peptides. Thus, those, such as Paul Shattock, who advocate this theory also advocate the use of a gluten-free, casein-free diet as a treatment for autism.

== Wakefield study ==
In 1998, a fraudulent paper by Andrew Wakefield was published in The Lancet presenting apparent evidence of a link between the MMR vaccine, gastrointestinal disease and autism. In this paper, which has since been retracted, Wakefield et al. speculated that food-derived peptides "may exert central-opioid effects, directly or through the formation of ligands with peptidase enzymes required for breakdown of endogenous central-nervous-system opioids, leading to disruption of normal neuroregulation and brain development by endogenous encephalins and endorphins".

== Later research ==
Reichelt published a number of papers concluding that autistic children excrete higher levels of peptides in their urine, as well as that such peptides may cause autistic gaze aversion; specifically, by interfering with corticothalamocortical processing of visual stimuli. As a result of this theory, others, particularly Panksepp, have speculated that opioid antagonists such as naloxone and naltrexone may be useful in the treatment of autism. In addition, Christopher Gillberg of the University of Gothenburg has published some studies showing that animals treated with opiates exhibit less clinging, in line with the behavior of autistic children, who, his research has also shown, "do not seem concerned when their parents are not near" and "exhibit less crying than infants without autism", and has also linked an excess of endogenous opioids to stereotypic (i.e. repetitive) behavior. However, more recently, two studies were published which failed to find a difference in levels of peptides in the urine of autistic children as opposed to those without autism. A 2009 review found that no evidence exists that urinary peptide levels are correlated with gut permeability.

== Possible implications for treatment ==
Several double blind studies experimented with low dose opioid antagonists, such as naltrexone, for treatment of autism. A 2014 systematic review showed statistically significant improvement in symptoms of irritability and hyperactivity in 77% of children treated with naltrexone. Core autism symptoms were unaffected. Side effects were mild and the drug was generally well tolerated. The number of children undergoing such therapy in the 10 analysed studies was 128.
