= Gluten-free, casein-free diet =

Diet that eliminates intake of gluten and casein

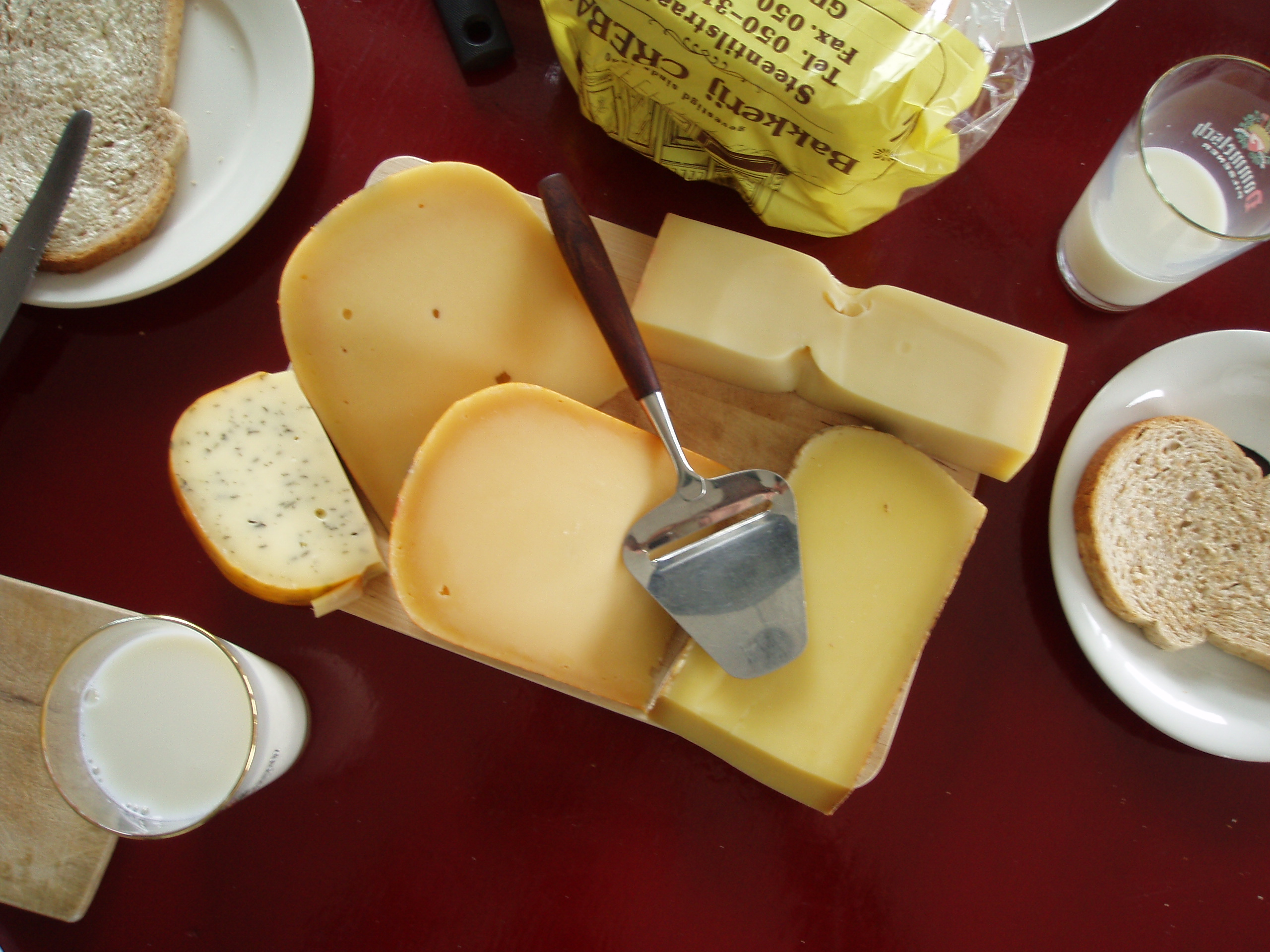
Many cheeses, bread and milk are forbidden on a casein- and gluten-free diet.

A gluten-free casein-free diet (GFCF diet), also known as a gluten-free dairy-free diet (GFDF diet), is a diet that does not include gluten (found most often in wheat, barley, and rye), and casein (found most often in milk and dairy products). It is most commonly discussed in relation to autism.

While some proponents claim such diets can alleviate or cure autism symptoms—often relying on anecdotal or non-scientific evidence—there is no conclusive scientific support for these claims. Studies employing rigorous methodology have not demonstrated significant benefits. Conversely, potential negative effects, including nutritional deficiencies, malnutrition, and social isolation, are documented in the scientific literature.

Exclusion diets are often implemented by parents of autistic children, notably in countries such as the United States, Canada, the United Kingdom, and France. While some parents report perceived improvements, claims of curing autism through dietary interventions are not supported by scientific evidence and are regarded as unsubstantiated.

== Contextualization ==
Since the 1990s, dietary approaches have increasingly been considered by some as complementary to therapeutic care in autism. Among these, gluten and casein-free diets have gained popularity, particularly among parents of autistic children in France, the United Kingdom, and North America. These diets have been widely adopted since the early 2000s despite the lack of scientific evidence supporting their effectiveness. The proliferation of such dietary interventions has occurred in a broader context of conflicting and abundant nutritional information. According to Jean-Louis Schlienger, honorary professor at the Faculty of Medicine of the University of Strasbourg, restrictive diets excluding products such as gluten or dairy lack a scientific basis at the population level and contradict established principles of dietary balance and diversity. Critics of these approaches, including Dr. Julie Dachez, argue that some proponents of exclusion diets and other so-called biomedical treatments for autism take advantage of parental anxiety by offering unproven solutions at significant financial cost.

Families often implement exclusion diets for autistic children based on personal testimonies, frequently found online, to alleviate autism-related symptoms. The popularity of such diets may be partly linked to the declining influence of psychoanalytic approaches and the broader uncertainty surrounding the causes of autism. This context has allowed for the emergence of various alternative theories, including those focused on nutrition. Decisions to adopt exclusion diets are sometimes influenced by written accounts from other parents.

These dietary interventions are typically carried out within the family setting and reflect a broader trend toward the deinstitutionalization of people with disabilities. As such, they constitute a form of home-based caregiving requiring ongoing parental oversight and control of the child's food intake.

== Mechanism ==
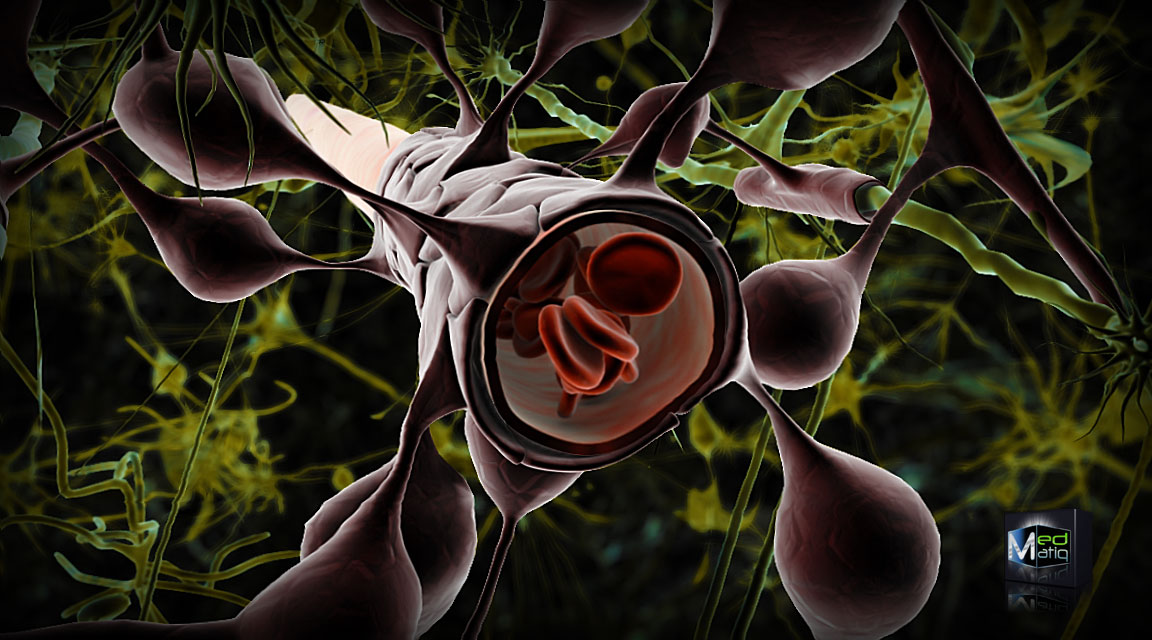
Blood-brain barrier: type 1 astrocytes surrounding blood capillaries in the brain

GFCF diets for autistic individuals are sometimes motivated by the hypothesis of an imbalance in the gut microbiota, which is suspected to contribute to gastrointestinal symptoms. However, according to Robel et al., the reported prevalence of such symptoms among autistic children may be overestimated. A frequently cited causal explanation involves increased intestinal permeability, purportedly triggered by the consumption of gluten and casein. This hypothesis suggests that undigested peptides, toxins, and pro-inflammatory cytokines could cross the blood-brain barrier and influence brain function. A 1996 study by P. D'Eufemia and colleagues is often cited in support of this theory, reporting lower intestinal permeability in autistic children compared to non-autistic peers. Nonetheless, the scientific basis of this mechanism remains under debate.

In the 1960s, Curtis Dohan speculated that the low incidence of schizophrenia in certain South Pacific Island societies was a result of a diet low in wheat and milk-based foods. Dohan proposed a genetic defect wherein individuals are incapable of completely metabolizing gluten and casein as a possible cause for schizophrenia. Dohan hypothesized that elevated peptide levels from this incomplete metabolism could be responsible for schizophrenic behaviors. In 1979, Jaak Panksepp proposed a connection between autism and opiates, noting that injections of minute quantities of opiates in young laboratory animals induce symptoms similar to those observed among autistic children.

Peptides were implicated in a 1982 study by Professor Christopher Gillberg, which suggested a possible link between peptide profiles and autism. However, these findings remain controversial, as a 1988 replication study by Le Couteur et al. did not identify a peptide profile specific to autistic individuals related to casein and gluten degradation.

The possibility of a relationship between autism and the consumption of gluten and casein was first articulated by Kalle Reichelt in 1991. Based on studies showing correlation between autism, schizophrenia, and increased urinary peptide levels, Reichelt hypothesized that some of these peptides may have an opiate effect. This led to the development of the opioid excess theory, expounded by Paul Shattock and others, which speculates that peptides with opioid activity cross into the bloodstream from the lumen of the intestine, and then into the brain. These peptides were speculated to arise from incomplete digestion of certain foods, in particular gluten from wheat and certain other cereals and from casein from milk and dairy produce. Further work confirmed opioid peptides such as casomorphines (from casein) and gluten exorphines and gliadorphin (from gluten) as possible suspects, due to their chemical similarity to opiates.

Reichelt hypothesized that long term exposure to these opiate peptides may have effects on brain maturation and contribute to social awkwardness and isolation. On this basis, Reichelt and others have proposed a gluten-free casein-free (GFCF) diet for those with autism to minimize the buildup of opiate peptides. Reichelt has also published a number of trials and reviews concluding that this diet is effective.

The opioid peptide hypothesis is often cited to support the use of gluten- and casein-free diets in autism. As of 2020, this hypothesis remains unproven. No conclusive evidence has demonstrated an effect of gluten or casein on gastrointestinal symptoms in autistic children. According to Robel et al., the frequency of digestive disorders in autistic children is not significantly higher than in normal children, suggesting that the co-occurrence of these conditions may be coincidental rather than causally linked. Although isolated cases associate autism with celiac disease, no consistent or proven correlation has been established between autism and celiac disease or irritable bowel syndrome.

The high prevalence of eating behavior disorders among autistic individuals has been identified as a potential factor contributing to digestive issues and imbalances in gut microbiota. A study published in Cell in November 2021 by Chloé X. Yap et al. concluded that changes in the intestinal bacterial flora of autistic individuals are likely the result of selective dietary patterns, rather than a cause of autism-related symptoms.

== Efficacy studies ==
Studies on the effects of exclusion diets in the context of autism often exhibit significant heterogeneity and methodological limitations, such as small sample sizes and the absence of control groups. A 2021 review of 26 studies on autism and dietary interventions by Zainab Taha and Khalid A. Abdalhai found no conclusive evidence supporting the efficacy of exclusion diets. Additionally, emphasis on dietary approaches may divert financial and research resources from other potentially more effective interventions.

Since the 1970s, studies have examined the effects of casein- and/or gluten-free diets on autistic individuals, partly influenced by an interpretation of a 1979 study by Jaak Panksepp. Research findings have been mixed. A 2002 study involving two groups of autistic children found no significant positive effects from the diet. A 2004 (updated in 2008) reported that current efficacy for these diets was poor but highlighted the need for further investigation. In 2006, a preliminary double-blind clinical trial involving 15 children aged 2 to 16 showed no statistically significant effects, although some parents reported behavioral improvements.

In 2012, a survey of 387 parents who had implemented gluten-free and casein-free diets for their autistic children reported perceived behavioral improvements. However, a 2016 double-blind clinical trial involving 14 autistic children aged 3 to 5 did not demonstrate any significant effect from the dietary intervention.

A first review of the scientific literature was conducted in 2010 by Dr. Austin Mulloy (University of Texas at Austin) and his team. Based on 15 previous studies, the review concluded: "A critical analysis of the methodological rigor and results of each study reveals that the current research body does not support the use of gluten-free and casein-free diets in treating ASD. Given the lack of empirical data and the often negative consequences associated with gluten-free diets [...] such diets should only be implemented if an autistic child exhibits acute behavioral changes that appear to be associated with dietary changes, and/or if healthcare professionals confirm through testing that the child has food allergies or intolerances to gluten and/or casein."

In 2013, Dr. Timothy Buie of Boston Children's Hospital conducted a review of studies focusing on gluten and autism and concluded that the available evidence was insufficient to support the use of a gluten-free diet as a treatment for autism. In 2014, Dr. Salvador Marí-Bauset and his team at the University of Valencia published a review in the Journal of Child Neurology, stating that few studies offered strong scientific evidence. They recommended implementing gluten-free and casein-free diets only in cases where food intolerances or allergies had been medically diagnosed. The review also emphasized the need for future studies with more robust designs and larger sample sizes.

In 2015, a review conducted by Klaus W. Lange and colleagues at the University of Regensburg, published in Current Opinion in Clinical Nutrition and Metabolic Care, reached conclusions consistent with previous reviews, finding insufficient evidence to support the use of gluten-free and casein-free diets as a treatment for autism.

In 2020, Busra Baspinar and Hulya Yardimci (University of Ankara) published a review of the scientific literature on gluten-free and casein-free diets in autism. Consistent with previous studies, they concluded that the available research was limited in both quantity and quality, and that the effect of such diets on autistic behaviors remained unclear. They noted that behavioral changes were often assessed through parental self-reports rather than objective evaluation methods.

Other official positions include:

- American Academy of Pediatrics – Clinical Report (2007). In their report, the AAP did not recommend the use of special diets for children with autism spectrum disorder because of inadequate evidence.
- Cochrane Library – Gluten and Casein-free diets in autism spectrum disorder (2008). The Cochrane review found that while relatively commonly used the evidence to support the diets use in children with autism was poor. All studies as of 2006 had issues with them.
- Research in Autism Spectrum Disorders – Gluten-free and casein free diets in the treatment of autism spectrum disorders: A systematic review (2009). It concluded that the results "reveal that the current corpus of research does not support the use of GFCF diets in the treatment of ASD. Given the lack of empirical support, and the adverse consequences often associated with GFCF diets (e.g. stigmatization, diversion of treatment resources, reduced bone cortical thickness), such diets should only be implemented in the event a child with ASD experiences acute behavioral changes, seemingly associated with changes in diet or a child has allergies or food intolerances to gluten or casein."
- Vanderbilt Evidence-based Practice Center – Therapies for Children with Autism Spectrum Disorder (2011). The review, commissioned by the Agency for Healthcare Research and Quality, concluded that, "the evidence supporting GFCF diets in ASD is limited and weak."
- Clinical Therapeutics – The relationship of autism to gluten (2013). This review found one double-blind study, which did not find any benefit from the gluten-free diet, and concluded that "Currently, there is insufficient evidence to support instituting a gluten-free diet as a treatment for autism."
- Journal of Child Neurology – Evidence of the Gluten-Free and Casein-Free Diet in Autism Spectrum Disorders: A Systematic Review (2014). This review found that "...the evidence on this topic is currently limited and weak," and noted that only a few randomized trials had been conducted on the efficacy of gluten-free diets as an autism treatment. The review also noted that even these trials were of questionable scientific merit because they were based on small sample sizes.
- Current Opinion in Clinical Nutrition & Metabolic Care – Gluten-free and casein-free diets in the therapy of autism (2015). This review found "limited and weak" evidence that this diet was effective as a treatment for autism, noting that most studies that had been done to assess its effectiveness were "seriously flawed".
- Autism Research Institute – The Autism Research Institute, an organization with a history of advocating unsupported hypotheses regarding autism, including that it can be caused by vaccines or treated with chelation therapy, recommends the GFCF/GFDF diet as a treatment for autism and related conditions. The organization believes that, "Dietary intervention is a cornerstone of an evidence-based medical approach, and there is convincing empirical evidence that special diets help many with autism."

== Side effects ==
According to several studies, dietary interventions in autistic individuals are often perceived as harmless, particularly by parents of autistic children, while potential negative consequences may be underestimated, especially during the initial stages of implementation.

=== Deficiencies and malnutrition ===
According to Baspinar and Yardimci, long-term use of restrictive diets such as gluten-free and casein-free regimens may result in micronutrient deficiencies. These diets require ongoing monitoring to ensure adequate nutritional intake. A 2005 study by Bernard Metz, James A. Mulick, and Eric M. Butter on controversial autism therapies also identified risks of malnutrition associated with such interventions. Mulloy and colleagues reported reduced cortical bone thickness as a potential side effect following prolonged adherence to a casein-free diet in a child. Research on the long-term use of these diets in non-autistic individuals has documented cases of severe malnutrition in the absence of consistent medical supervision.

=== Cost and social isolation ===
Baspinar and Yardimci identify the economic burden, social isolation, and various social and psychological consequences associated with exclusion diets for families. Sociologist Amandine Rochedy notes that excluding specific foods can place additional demands on caregivers, particularly in terms of increased mental load and time required for meal preparation. The financial impact is further compounded by the need to purchase dietary supplements to prevent nutritional deficiencies.

=== Consequences for children ===
Rochedy notes that exclusion diets may contribute to increased social isolation among autistic children, particularly in social settings such as birthday parties, family meals, or school cafeterias. This outcome appears contradictory to the objective of many autism interventions, which prioritize social integration. Gastroenterologist Dr. Moschoutis highlights the potential psychological effects of restrictive diets, such as depriving children of typical pleasures, including sweets, in efforts to manage autism. Rochedy also observes that excluding gluten and casein may remove preferred foods from the diets of autistic children with high food selectivity, potentially worsening existing eating challenges.

Testimonies cited by Olivia Cattan describe the emotional strain such dietary restrictions may place on families.

== Official recommendations ==
The increase in the use of exclusion diets for autistic children led pediatricians from the French-speaking Group of Gastroenterology and Nutrition to request a review by the French Food Safety Agency (AFSSA). In its April 2009 report, the agency concluded that there was insufficient evidence to confirm the safety of gluten- and casein-free diets in the short, medium, or long term. It also stated that the arguments commonly used to motivate such diets—such as excess exorphins, abnormal peptide excretion, and digestive disorders—were not supported by validated scientific data. As a result, the report did not recommend the use of these diets.

The French National Authority for Health advised against the use of exclusion diets in its 2012 report, a position also supported by the findings of Metz et al. (2005). Similarly, the National Institute for Health and Care Excellence in the United Kingdom recommended against such diets in its 2013 guidelines. In 2022, the United Kingdom's National Health Service included exclusion diets — including gluten-free and casein-free diets — on a list of alternative autism treatments it found showed no benefit and did not recommend to the public.

== Promotion of exclusion diets ==
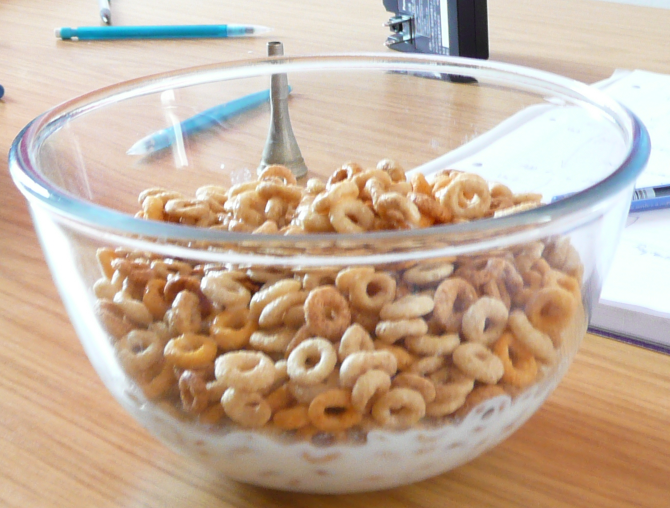
A bowl of breakfast cereal with milk, a food falsely presented as a possible factor in autism in a PETA advertising campaign.

In 2008 and 2014, the organization People for the Ethical Treatment of Animals (PETA) launched an English-language advertising campaign suggesting a link between milk consumption and autism. The campaign featured the slogan "Got autism?" alongside imagery referencing the earlier "Got Milk?" campaign. The initiative was criticized for lacking a scientific basis. Journalist Jeffrey Kluger and pediatrician Susan McGrew both condemned the campaign, highlighting its pseudoscientific message and its potential to generate guilt among parents and misconceptions about autism.

In her 2015 book Être et ne plus être autiste, Canadian author Nathalie Champoux claimed to have cured her two children of autism through dietary changes—eliminating milk, gluten, soy, and refined sugars—and chelation therapy. The book received criticism for promoting pseudoscientific claims, notably from the Association des communicateurs scientifiques du Québec, pediatrician Jean-François Chicoine of Sainte-Justine Hospital, and neuroscientist Laurent Mottron.

According to Rochedy, some parents report reductions in autism-related symptoms and behavioral improvements in the initial days following the implementation of exclusion diets. Such accounts have been published in the French popular press, with a few parents claiming their children were cured. In 2016, a family reported in the Revue Francophone d'Orthoptie that a diet excluding milk, gluten, and sugars had resolved their child's recurring ear infections.

== See also ==
- Autism therapies
- Gluten-related disorders
- List of alternative therapies for developmental and learning disabilities
- List of diets
- Opioid excess theory
