= Newcastle–Ottawa scale =

Tool for assessing quality of non-randomized studies

In statistics, the Newcastle–Ottawa scale (NOS) is a tool used for assessing the quality of non-randomized studies included in a systematic review and/or meta-analyses. Using the tool, each study is judged on eight items, categorized into three groups: the selection of the study groups; the comparability of the groups; and the ascertainment of either the exposure or outcome of interest for case-control or cohort studies respectively. Stars awarded for each quality item serve as a quick visual assessment. Stars are awarded such that the highest quality studies are awarded up to nine stars. The method was developed as a collaboration between the University of Newcastle, Australia, and the University of Ottawa, Canada, using a Delphi process to define variables for data extraction. The scale was then tested on systematic reviews and further refined. Separate tools were developed for cohort and case–control studies. It has also been adapted for prevalence studies.

Strengths of the Newcastle–Ottawa scale are is that it is relatively quick to use, and its questions can be adapted to the study domain. However, there has been shown to be low levels in agreement when multiple reviewers use the Newcastle–Ottawa scale to assess studies.

A 2019 study of systematic reviews of healthcare interventions found the Newcastle–Ottawa scale to be the most commonly used risk-of-bias tool to assess non-randomized studies in systematic reviews that used multiple risk of bias tools.
