= Gender dysphoria in children =

Discontent with sex assigned at birth in children

- Other names: Gender identity disorder in children, gender incongruence of childhood
- Specialty: Psychiatry
- Usual onset: Childhood

Gender dysphoria (GD) in children, also known as gender incongruence (GI) of childhood, is a formal diagnosis for distress (gender dysphoria) caused by incongruence between assigned sex and gender identity in some pre-pubescent transgender and gender diverse children.

The diagnosis Gender dysphoria in children is defined in the 5th edition of the Diagnostic and Statistical Manual of Mental Disorders (DSM), and Gender incongruence of childhood is defined in the 11th edition of the International Classification of Diseases (ICD) but considered a physical rather than psychiatric condition. The diagnoses replaced gender identity disorder in children, which had been present in the DSM since 1980 and ICD since 1990 but were considered stigmatizing towards transgender people. The diagnoses were kept to insure insurance coverage for gender-affirming healthcare.

The GD diagnosis is controversial in the transgender community as some feel it continues to stigmatize transgender identity.

== Classification ==
Children with persistent gender dysphoria are characterized by more extreme gender dysphoria in childhood than children with desisting gender dysphoria. Some (but not all) gender variant youth will want or need to transition, which may involve social transition (changing dress, name, pronoun), and, for older youth and adolescents, medical transition (hormone therapy or surgery).

=== DSM-5 ===
The fifth edition of the Diagnostic and Statistical Manual of Mental Disorders (DSM-5) published by the American Psychiatric Association in 2013 introduced a diagnosis of Gender Dysphoria in Children.

The main diagnostic criterion is a marked incongruence between experienced/expressed gender and assigned gender, of at least six months duration, as manifested by at least six of the following (one of which must be the first criterion):

- A strong desire to be of the other gender or an insistence that one is the other gender
- A strong preference for wearing clothes typical of the opposite gender
- A strong preference for cross-gender roles in make-believe play or fantasy play
- A strong preference for the toys, games or activities stereotypically used or engaged in by the other gender
- A strong preference for playmates of the other gender
- A strong rejection of toys, games and activities typical of one's assigned gender
- A strong dislike of one's sexual anatomy
- A strong desire for the physical sex characteristics that match one's experienced gender

In order to meet the criteria, the condition must also be associated with clinically significant distress or impairment in social, occupational, or other important areas of functioning.

The DSM-III, published 1980, included "Gender Identity Disorder of Childhood" for prepubertal children and "Transsexualism" for adolescents and adults. The DSM-IV, published 1994, collapsed the two diagnoses into "Gender Identity Disorder" with different criteria for adolescents and adults. Until the mid-2000s, attempting to prevent "transsexualism" in prepubertal youth diagnosed with GIDC was considered a legitimate goal of treatment. The necessity of the diagnosis was debated by the LGBT community and such gender identity change efforts for youth were protested.

The DSM-5 renamed the diagnosis to "Gender Dysphoria" to avoid stigmatizing transgender people's identities and focus on the distress some experienced. It also updated the language to be more inclusive of nonbinary people and moved gender dysphoria to its own section instead of listing it as a sexual disorder. The DSM-5 separated the diagnosis from that of "gender dysphoria in adolescents and adults and set more stringent behavioral criteria. The diagnosis is controversial among the transgender community since some consider it stigmatizing to be classified as a medical disorder.

=== International Classification of Diseases (ICD) ===
The International Classification of Diseases (ICD-11) defines "Gender incongruence of childhood" (HA61) as

Gender incongruence of childhood is characterised by a marked incongruence between an individual's experienced/expressed gender and the assigned sex in pre-pubertal children. It includes a strong desire to be a different gender than the assigned sex; a strong dislike on the child's part of his or her sexual anatomy or anticipated secondary sex characteristics and/or a strong desire for the primary and/or anticipated secondary sex characteristics that match the experienced gender; and make-believe or fantasy play, toys, games, or activities and playmates that are typical of the experienced gender rather than the assigned sex. The incongruence must have persisted for about 2 years. Gender variant behaviour and preferences alone are not a basis for assigning the diagnosis.

The ICD-11 replaced the outdated categories "transsexualism" and "gender identity disorder of childhood", present in the ICD-10, with "gender incongruence of adolescence and adulthood" and "gender incongruence of childhood" respectively in addition to moving them from the chapter "Mental and behavioral disorders" to the chapter "Conditions related to sexual health" due to "current knowledge that trans-related and gender diverse identities are not conditions of mental ill-health, and that classifying them as such can cause enormous stigma." The diagnosis was kept to ensure transgender people's access to gender affirming care and health insurance.

== Prevalence ==
According to a review published in 2020 relying on recent statistical surveys, 1.2% to 2.7% of children and adolescents worldwide identify as transgender. The data was drawn more from studies of adolescents than pre-pubertal youth and noted a difference in methodological quality between studies published before and after 2010. The review called for more systematic studies and reviews in future.

A 2023 study conducted by the Centers for Disease Control and Prevention found that 3.3% of United States high school students identified as transgender and 2.2% identified as questioning.

== Persistence ==
According to the American Academy of Pediatrics, most children have a stable sense of their gender identity by age 4. They explain that research shows prepubertal children who assert a transgender or gender diverse (TGD) identity know their gender as clearly and as consistently as their cisgender peers. A 2018 study in Pediatrics found that children with a TGD identity first recognize it internally at an average age of 8.5 years, but do not disclose it until on average 10 years later.

If gender dysphoria persists during puberty, it is very likely permanent. Factors that are associated with gender dysphoria persisting through puberty include intensity of gender dysphoria, amount of cross-gendered behavior, and verbal identification with the desired/experienced gender (i.e., stating that they are a different gender rather than wish to be a different gender).

'Desistance' has alternatively been defined as desisting from a transgender identity or gender dysphoria. The term desistance itself has been criticized as pathologizing for its roots in criminal research and oppositional defiant disorder, where desistance is considered a positive outcome.

A systematic review of research relating to the topic in 2022 found it was poorly defined: studies sometimes did not define it or equally defined it as desistance of transgender identity or desistance of gender dysphoria. They also found none of the definitions allowed for dynamic or nonbinary gender identities and the majority of articles published were editorial pieces. They stated the concept was based on biased research from the 1960–80s and poor quality research in the 2000s. They concluded there was a "dearth of high-quality hypothesis-driven research that currently exists" on the subject, and suggested that desistance should "be removed from clinical and research discourse to focus instead on supporting [transgender and gender-expansive] youth rather than attempting to predict their future gender identity."

== Management ==
The WPATH Standards of Care and other therapeutic interventions do not seek to change a child's gender identity. Instead, clinicians advise children and their parents to avoid goals based on gender identity and to instead cope with the child's distress by embracing psychoeducation and to be supportive of their gender variant identity and behavior as it develops. A clinician may suggest that the parent be attentive, listen, and encourage an environment for the child to explore and express their identified gender identity, which may be termed the true gender. This can remove the stigma associated with their dysphoria, as well as the pressure to conform to a gender identity or role they do not identify with, which may be termed the false gender self. WPATH Standards of Care also recommend assessing and treating any co-existing mental health issues. The majority of major medical associations define attempts to change an individual's gender identity or gender expression as conversion therapy and strongly discourage it citing concerns of a lack of scientific credibility and clinical utility with these practices.

Treatment may also take the form of puberty blockers (e.g., leuprorelin), cross-sex hormones (i.e., administering estrogen to a child assigned male at birth or testosterone to a child assigned female at birth), or sex reassignment surgery when the child has reached the age of medical majority, with the aim of bringing one's physical body in line with their identified gender. Delaying puberty allows for the child to mentally mature while preventing them from developing a body they may not want, so that they may make a more informed decision about their gender identity once they are an adolescent. It can also help reduce anxiety and depression. Short-term side effects of puberty blockers include headaches, fatigue, insomnia, muscle aches and changes in breast tissue, mood, and weight. Research on the long-term effects on brain development, cognitive function, fertility, and sexual function is limited.

According to the American Psychiatric Association, "Due to the dynamic nature of puberty development, lack of gender-affirming interventions (i.e., social, psychological, and medical) is not a neutral decision; youth often experience worsening dysphoria and negative impact on mental health as the incongruent and unwanted puberty progresses. Trans-affirming treatment, such as the use of puberty suppression, is associated with the relief of emotional distress, and notable gains in psychosocial and emotional development, in trans and gender diverse youth".

In its position statement published December 2020, the Endocrine Society stated that there is durable evidence for a biological underpinning to gender identity and that pubertal suppression, hormone therapy, and medically indicated surgery are effective and relatively safe when monitored appropriately and have been established as the standard of care. They noted a decrease in suicidal ideation among youth who have access to gender-affirming care and comparable levels of depression to cisgender peers among socially transitioned pre-pubertal youth. In its 2017 guideline on treating those with gender dysphoria, it recommends puberty blockers be started when the child has started puberty (Tanner Stage 2 for breast or genital development) and cross-sex hormones be started at 16, though they note "there may be compelling reasons to initiate sex hormone treatment prior to the age of 16 years in some adolescents with GD/gender incongruence". They recommend a multidisciplinary team of medical and mental health professionals manage the treatment for those under 18. They also recommend "monitoring clinical pubertal development every 3 to 6 months and laboratory parameters every 6 to 12 months during sex hormone treatment".

For adolescents, WPATH says that physical interventions such as puberty blockers, hormone therapy, or surgery may be appropriate. Before any physical interventions are initiated, however, a psychiatric assessment exploring the psychological, family, and social issues around the adolescent's gender dysphoria should be undertaken. WPATH's Standards of Care 8, published in 2022, declare puberty blocking medication as "medically necessary", and recommends them for usage in transgender adolescents once the patient has reached Tanner stage 2 of development, and state that longitudinal shows improved outcomes for transgender patients who receive them.

While few studies have examined the effects of puberty blockers for gender non-conforming or transgender adolescents, the studies that have been conducted generally indicate that these treatments are reasonably safe, are reversible, and can improve psychological well-being.

A 2020 review published in Child and Adolescent Mental Health found that puberty blockers are reversible and associated with such positive outcomes as decreased suicidality in adulthood, improved affect and psychological functioning, and improved social life. A 2020 survey published in Pediatrics found that puberty blockers are associated with better mental health outcomes and lower odds of lifetime suicidal ideation. A 2022 study published in the Journal of the American Medical Association found a 60% reduction in moderate and severe depression and a 73% reduction in suicidality among transgender youth aged 13–20 who took puberty blockers and gender-affirming hormones over a 12-month follow-up. A 2022 study published in The Lancet involving 720 transgender adolescents who took puberty blockers and hormones found that 98% continued to use hormones at a follow-up appointment.

In 2020, a review article commissioned by NHS England was published by the National Institute for Health and Care Excellence, concluding that the quality of evidence for puberty blocker outcomes (for mental health, quality of life and impact on gender dysphoria) was of very low certainty based on the GRADE scale. The Finnish government commissioned a review of the research evidence for treatment of minors and the Finnish Ministry of Health concluded that there are no research-based health care methods for minors with gender dysphoria. Nevertheless, they recommend the use of puberty blockers for minors on a case-by-case basis. The American Academy of Pediatrics state that "pubertal suppression in children who identify as TGD [transgender and gender diverse] generally leads to improved psychological functioning in adolescence and young adulthood."

In 2024, NHS England endorsed the Cass Review of gender treatment for children and young people, which questioned the reliability of existing guidelines and made various recommendations. The review has received criticism from some international medical organisations.

== See also ==
- Childhood gender nonconformity
- Transgender youth
- List of transgender-related topics
