= Indolyl-3-acryloylglycine =

Names
- Preferred IUPAC name [(2E)-3-(1H-Indol-3-yl)prop-2-enamido]acetic acid
- Other names indoleacrylic glycine

Identifiers
CAS Number	3475-68-1
3D model (JSmol)	Interactive image
ChEBI	CHEBI:145761
ChemSpider	62896826
PubChem CID	5370648
UNII	NEY8PP6VM8
- InChI: InChI=1S/C13H12N2O3/c16-12(15-8-13(17)18)6-5-9-7-14-11-4-2-1-3-10(9)11/h1-7,14H,8H2,(H,15,16)(H,17,18)/b6-5+ Key: DUIFVCFSAWHIOD-AATRIKPKSA-N
- SMILES: C1=CC=C2C(=C1)C(=CN2)C=CC(=O)NCC(=O)O

Properties
Chemical formula	C_{13}H_{12}N_{2}O_{3}
Molar mass	244.26 g/mol
- Except where otherwise noted, data are given for materials in their standard state (at 25 °C [77 °F], 100 kPa). Infobox references

Indolyl-3-acryloylglycine, also known as trans-indolyl-3-acryloylglycine, or IAG for short, is a compound consisting of an indole group attached to an acrylic acid moiety, which is in turn attached to a glycine molecule. This compound has been shown to isomerize when exposed to light. It is likely a metabolic intermediate in the biosynthesis of tryptophan, and is synthesized from tryptophan via indolepropionic acid and indoleacrylicacid (IAcrA). It is also likely that IAcrA is converted into IAG in the gut wall. It may also be produced by certain elements of the mammalian gut microbiota by phenylalanine ammonia-lyase. Identifiable in the urine by high-performance liquid chromatography, it may be a biomarker for autism spectrum disorders, as demonstrated by the research of Paul Shattock and other researchers from Australia. These researchers have reported that urinary levels of IAG are much higher in autistic children than in controls; however, other researchers have found no association between IAG concentrations in the urine and autism. Its excretion in the urine may also be changed in Hartnup disease and celiac disease, as well as photodermatosis, muscular dystrophy, and liver cirrhosis.
