= Kalle Reichelt =

Norwegian medical researcher and alternative medicine practitioner

Karl Ludvig Reichelt
- Born: 28 November 1933
- Died: 29 October 2016 (aged 82)
- Education: University of Oslo
- Known for: Alternative medicine Alternative therapies for developmental and learning disabilities Gluten-free, casein-free diets Opioid excess theory
- Awards: King's Medal of Merit
- Scientific career
- Workplaces: Oslo University Hospital, Rikshospitalet
- Thesis: An investigation into the nature and function of anionic acids, peptides, and acid-soluble proteins from brain tissue (1972)

Karl Ludvig "Kalle" Reichelt (28 November 1933 – 29 October 2016) was a Norwegian medical researcher and alternative medicine practitioner. He was best known for the controversial and unproven claim that opioid peptides derived from casein and gluten were causally linked to various psychiatric disorders, as well as his suggestion that gluten-free, casein-free diets could be used to treat them.

== Education ==
In 1972, Reichelt earned his medical doctorate from the University of Oslo. His thesis was titled, "An investigation into the nature and function of anionic acids, peptides, and acid-soluble proteins from brain tissue."

== Career ==
Reichelt worked at the Pediatric Research Institute at what is now Oslo University Hospital, Rikshospitalet from 1972 to 2012. He was a senior researcher and advisor.

Reichelt received a gold King's Medal of Merit in 2004.

=== Alternative medicine ===
Reichelt's clinical research primarily focused on searching for a link between food and psychiatric disorders. He alleged that the reabsorption of improperly digested peptides (specifically casomorphins and gluten exorphins) had an opioid-like impact on the brain and could be causally linked to anorexia, attention deficit hyperactivity disorder, autism, clinical depression, and schizophrenia. Reichelt also alleged urine tests could identify those not properly breaking down the peptides into amino acids and recommended gluten-free, casein-free diets as a treatment. However, Reichelt's findings were controversial, and his opioid excess theory has not been validated within mainstream medical circles.
