= World Autism Organisation =

International health organization

- Formation: November 21, 1998; 27 years ago
- Founded at: Luxembourg
- Secretary General: Stacy Badon
- President: Petra Dillmann
- Affiliations: Autism Research Institute USA, Autismedi, Autism Association of Namibia, Education and Services for People With Autism, Gulf Autism Union, Kuwait Autism Society, Kuwait Center for Autism, Otizm Dernekleri Federasyonu (Federation of Autism Associations), Svijet u Slikama
- Website: https://worldautismorganisation.com/

The World Autism Organisation (abbreviated WAO) is an international organization dedicated to improving the quality of life of people with autism and their families. It was established in Luxembourg on November 21, 1998, by Autism-Europe, during a ceremony at the European Parliament, in the presence of Grand-Duchess Joséphine-Charlotte. Its first general assembly occurred in 2000. It has been called "the first genuinely international organisation for autism". The organization aspires to have members from every continent in the world.

== History ==
The current president of the World Autism Organisation is Petra Dillmann. One of her sons is autistic. She established the Autism Association of Namibia. She joined WAO in 2000, and her presidency began in 2022.

== Structure ==
The membership of the World Autism Organization consists of the general assembly, the council of administration, the executive committee, the secretariat, and the committees. Vice-presidents are chosen from six different areas of the world (Africa, Asia, Europe, the Middle East, North America, Latin America and East Asia/the Pacific). The Council of Administration is a collective name for the president, the president-elect, the past president, a vice president from each region of the world, and councillors who act as representatives of affiliated and individual members. The executive committee consists of the President, the President-elect, the vice-presidents, the Treasurer and the Honorary Secretary General. The Secretariat is chosen by the executive committee.

Meetings of the General Assembly are held every year, in which the General Assembly elects new members to the Council of Administration. Presidents of the organization and members of the Council of Administration serve 4-year terms. The President-elect serves a 2-year term.

== Membership ==
The membership of WAO consists of five groups: Full Members, Individual Members, Affiliated Member Organisations, and Provisional Members. All types of membership require a yearly fee which goes to funding the organization's projects. Full Members must be voluntary autism-focused organizations with no connection to any government body.

== Objectives ==
The objectives of the WAO as stated in their constitution are:

- To promote among all people and nations the highest possible quality of life for people with autism and their families.
- To strengthen the self-awareness of persons with autism, to develop their personality, self-respect and sense of responsibility.
- To advance the rights of people with autism and their families without regard to nationality, race, gender or creed, by securing on their behalf from all possible sources, the provision of support, residential, educational, training, employment and welfare health services.
- To create a common bond of understanding among persons with autism, their parents and families throughout the world.
- To promote the interests of persons with autism and their families by bringing about co-operation among organisations representing national endeavors on their behalf.
- To promote the highest possible level of knowledge and competency among professionals of autism, encompassing the most current scientific information and validated techniques.

== Affiliates ==
WAO is affiliated with a number of other organizations around the world focused on aiding people with autism.

- The Autism Medical Institute (AutisMedi), was established in 2015. It focuses on awareness and education on autism spectrum disorders in Turkey.
