= American Society of Plastic Surgeons =

Organization for plastic surgeons

- Industry: Medicine
- Founded: 1931
- Headquarters: Arlington Heights, IL, USA
- Revenue: $30.3 million (2024)
- Members: 11,000
- Website: plasticsurgery.org

The American Society of Plastic Surgeons (ASPS) is a professional society that represents plastic surgeons primarily in the United States and Canada. ASPS was founded in 1931 and is composed predominantly of surgeons certified by the American Board of Plastic Surgery or by the Royal College of Physicians and Surgeons of Canada. Reporting more than 11,000 physician members worldwide, the society is an information source on cosmetic and reconstructive plastic surgery. ASPS publishes the plastic surgery journal Plastic and Reconstructive Surgery and runs the Plastic Surgery Foundation, which supports research through grants, awards, and scholarships.

== Positions ==
=== Gender-affirming surgery ===
In February 2026, the ASPS issued a position statement containing a blanket recommendation against gender-affirming surgery for patients under the age of 19. In doing so, it heavily cited the Trump administration HHS gender dysphoria report, which was written in compliance with Executive Order 14187, that made it illegal for the federal government to advocate in favor of gender affirming care under the age of 19; and which recommended conversion therapy instead. The ASPS also cited its British counterpart, the Cass Review. Both reports have been criticized for spreading misinformation about gender-affirming care. The decision was lauded by the Trump administration including HHS leaders Robert F. Kennedy Jr., Jim O'Neill, Mehmet Oz and Mike Stuart. However, ASPS stopped short of issuing new clinical practice guidelines. They also added that they were opposed to governments banning gender-affirming surgery, saying that "regulation of medical care is best achieved through professional self-regulation, rather than criminal law or punitive legislative approaches." Additionally, ASPS said they would be open to revisiting and re assessing the position in the future "should the evidence base evolve to demonstrate clear benefit with acceptable risk". The statement was criticized by other major medical associations and trans advocates who said there is "no definitive age or one-size-fits-all approach for every patient" and emphasized that care should be delivered in case-by-case assessments rather than blanket opposition. In March, it was revealed that representatives for the ASPS and several other medical organizations had met with Dr. Mehmet Oz, a member of the Trump administration who vehemently opposes gender-affirming care prior to the release of their new statement. During the meeting, Dr. Oz attempted to pressure the organizations to abandon their support for gender-affirming care. The Society for Evidence-Based Gender Medicine (SEGM), an SPLC-designated hate group was also present at the meeting and Kathleen McDeavitt, one of the co-authors of the HHS report, also gave a presentation at the meeting. This led to speculation and accusations that the statement may have been influenced by the Trump administration, although the ASPS denies this.
