= Hooven =

Hooven may refer to:

- Hooven, Ohio, census-designated place in Ohio, United States
- Carole Hooven, evolutionary biologist
- Ed Hooven, Canadian politician
- Kate Hooven, American synchronized swimmer
- Helen Hooven Santmyer, American writer, educator, and librarian
- Lane–Hooven House, historic house museum in Hamilton, Ohio, United States
- Hooven-Owens-Rentschler, a company that manufactured steam and diesel engines in Hamilton, Ohio
