= Side altar =

Church altar subordinate to the high altar

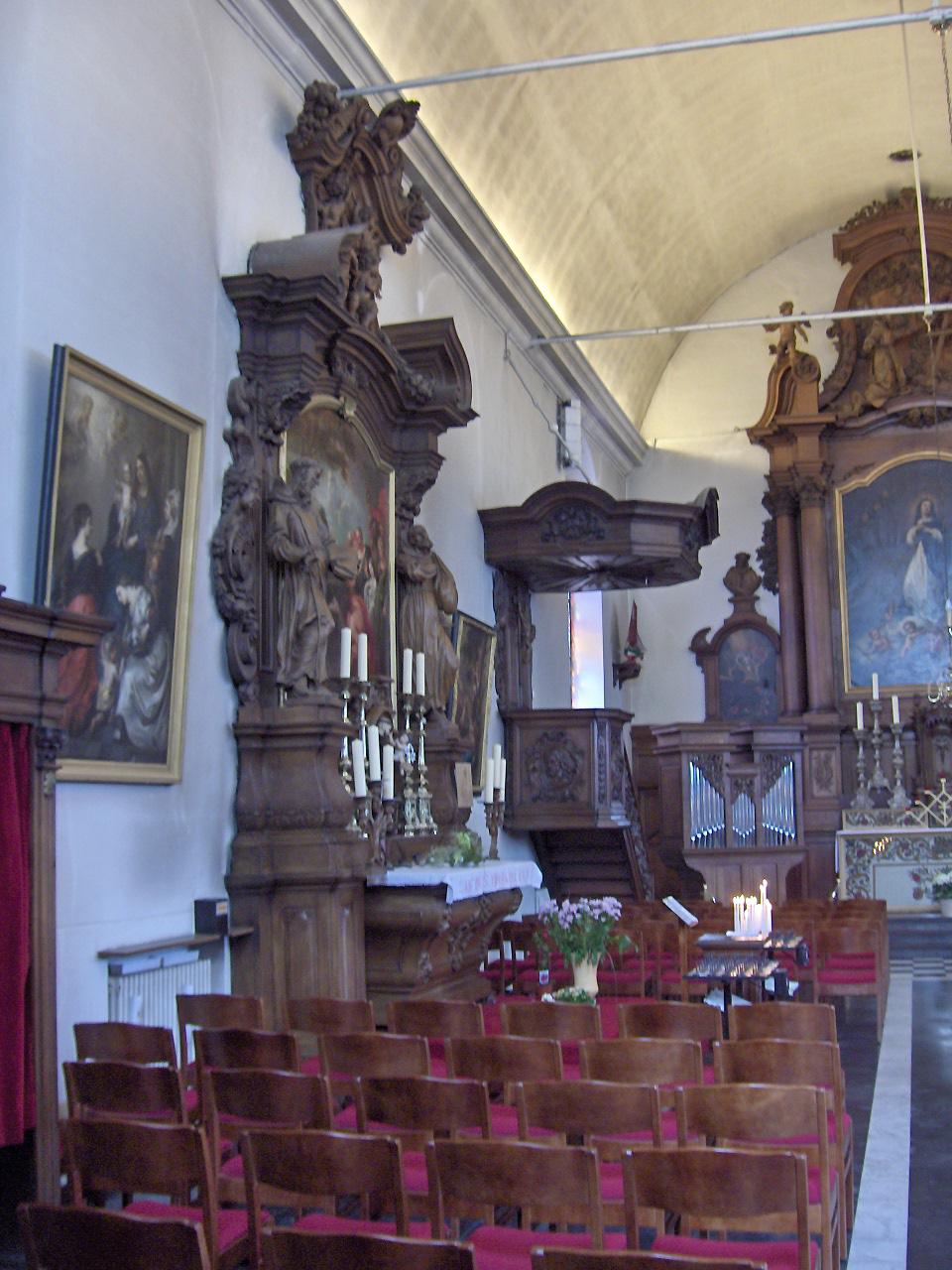
A bye-altar in the Kapucijnenkerk; Ostend, Belgium. Notice the high altar in the background.

In Christianity, a side-altar or bye-altar is an altar that is subordinate to the central or high altar in a church. The term is generally applied to altars situated in bays of the nave, transepts, etc. Side-altars may be recessed in a side-chapel, or simply built against a main aisle wall.

In the Catholic Church, before the liturgical reforms arising from the Second Vatican Council, separate Masses were celebrated simultaneously by other priests at bye-altars, even as there is an ongoing Mass at the high altar. After the Second Vatican Council, this practice disappeared subsequent to the introduction of concelebration at the high altar.

Certain churches in the Evangelical-Lutheran tradition of Christianity retained bye-altars, though their presence in newer churches are not as common today.

== Gallery ==
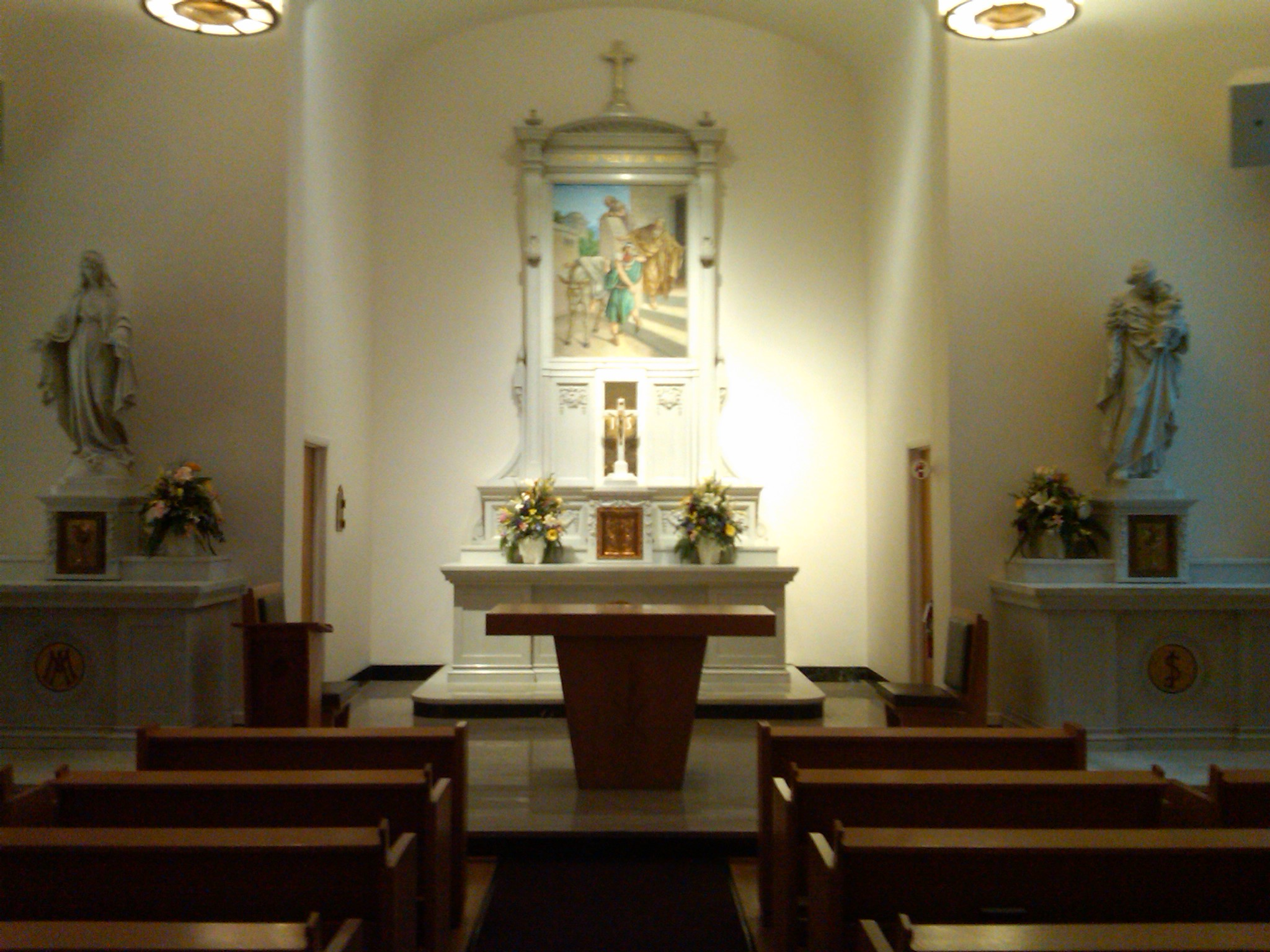
Bye-altars present to the left and right side of the chancel at Saint Thomas Hospital in Akron, Ohio

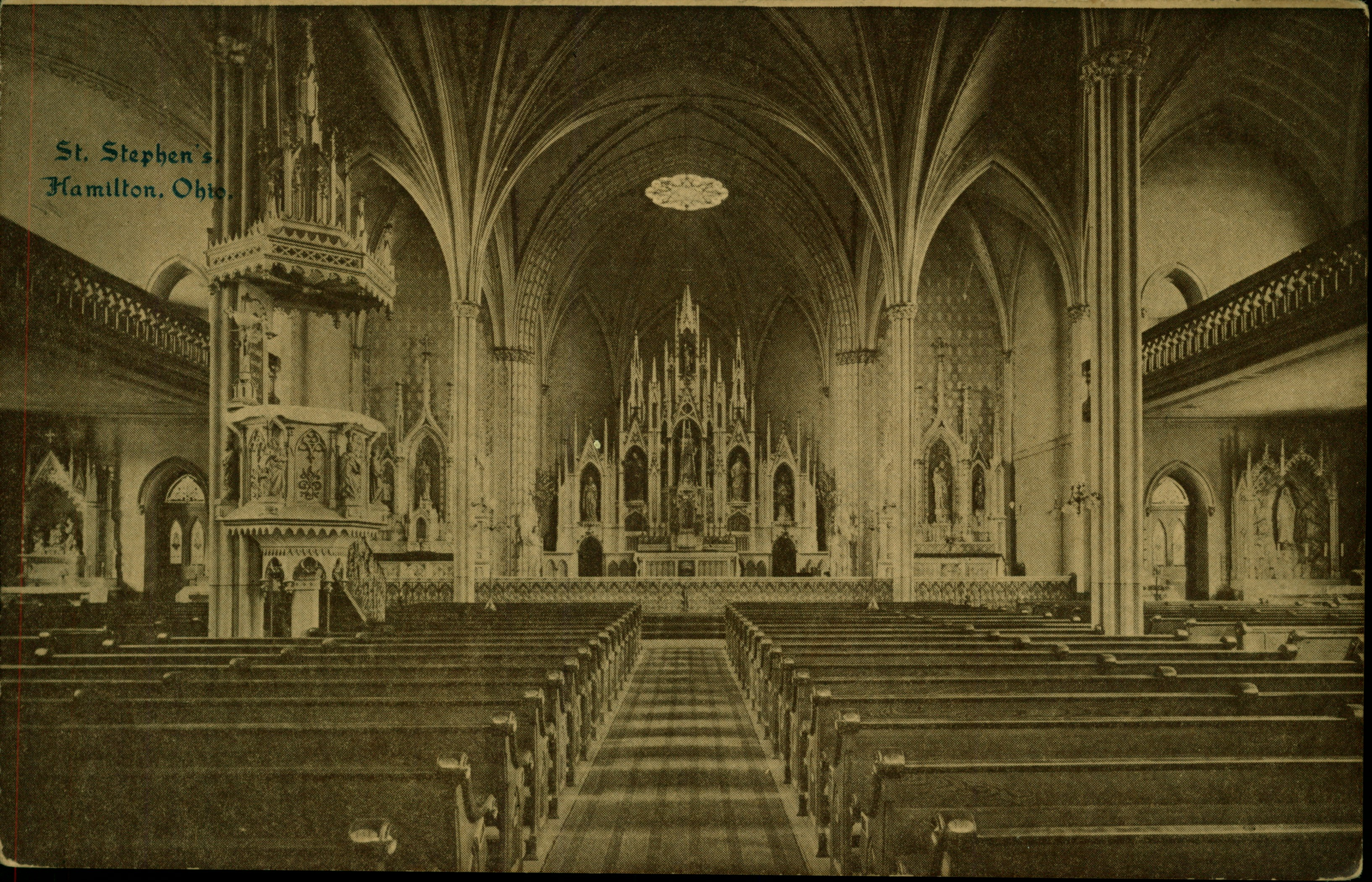
Bye-altars present to the left and right side of the chancel at St. Stephen Church in Hamilton, Ohio

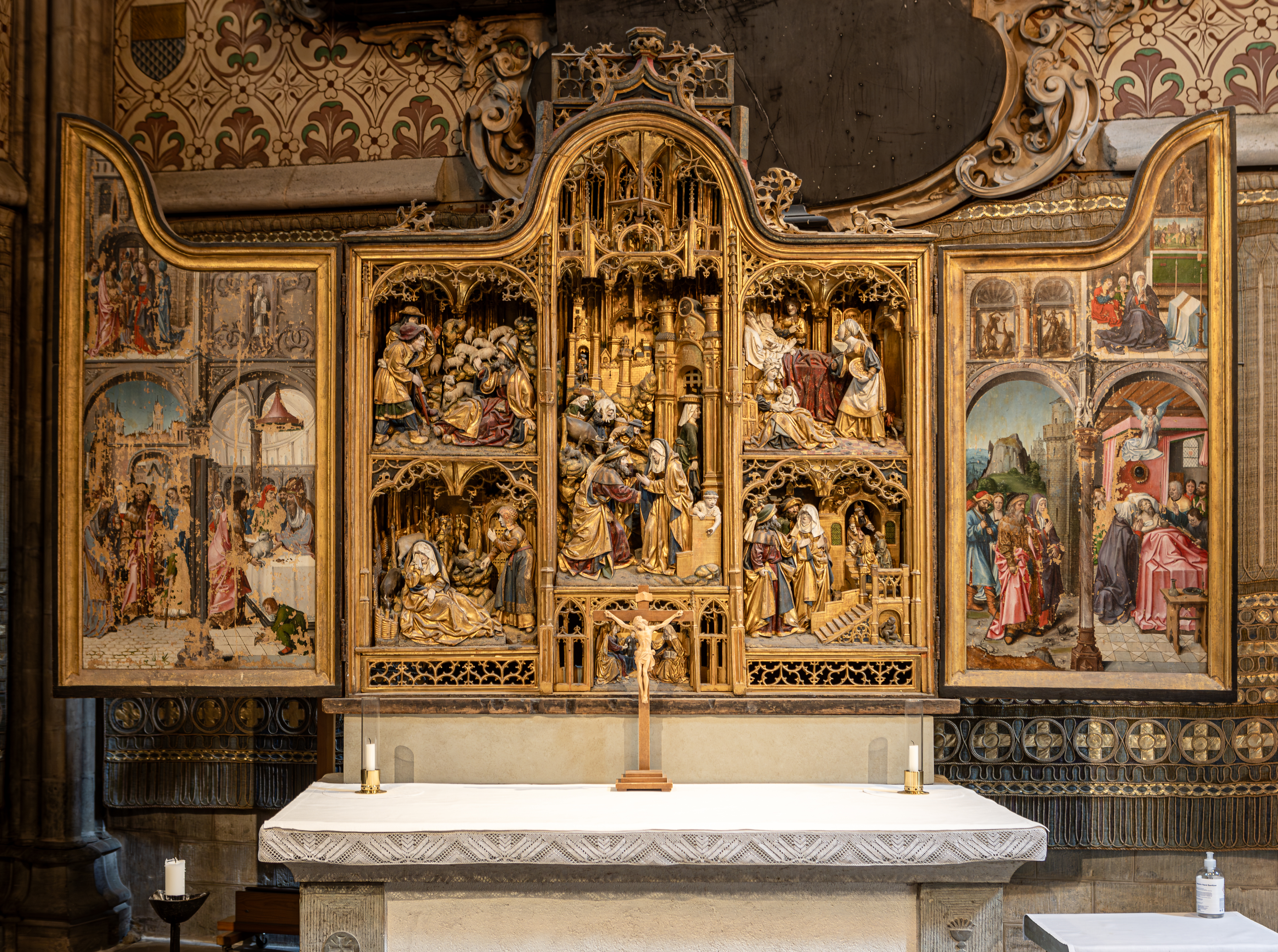
A bye-altar dedicated to Saint Anne in the Evangelical-Lutheran Uppsala Cathedral, Sweden

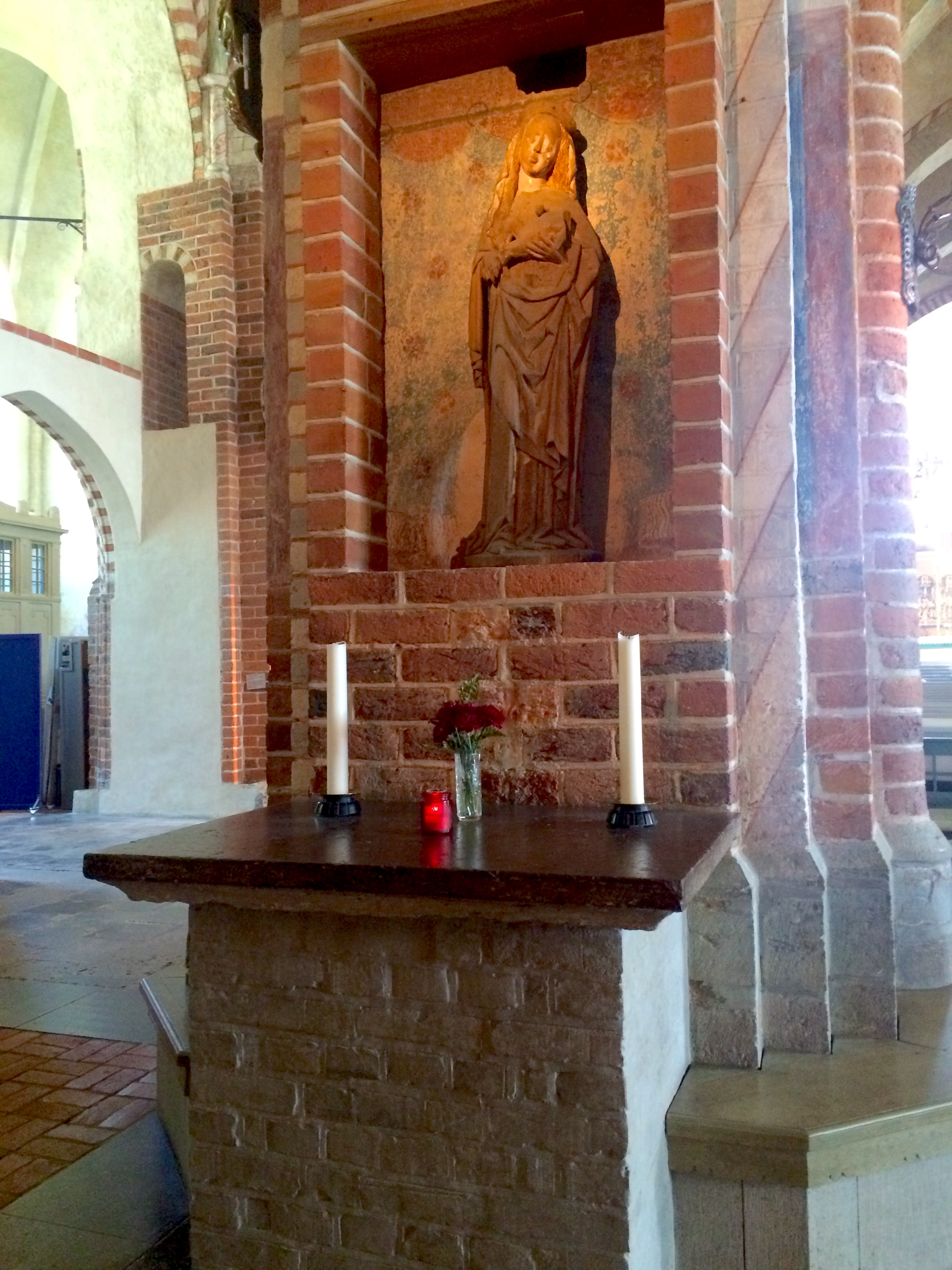
A bye-altar dedicated to the Blessed Virgin Mary in the Evangelical-Lutheran Strängnäs Cathedral, Sweden

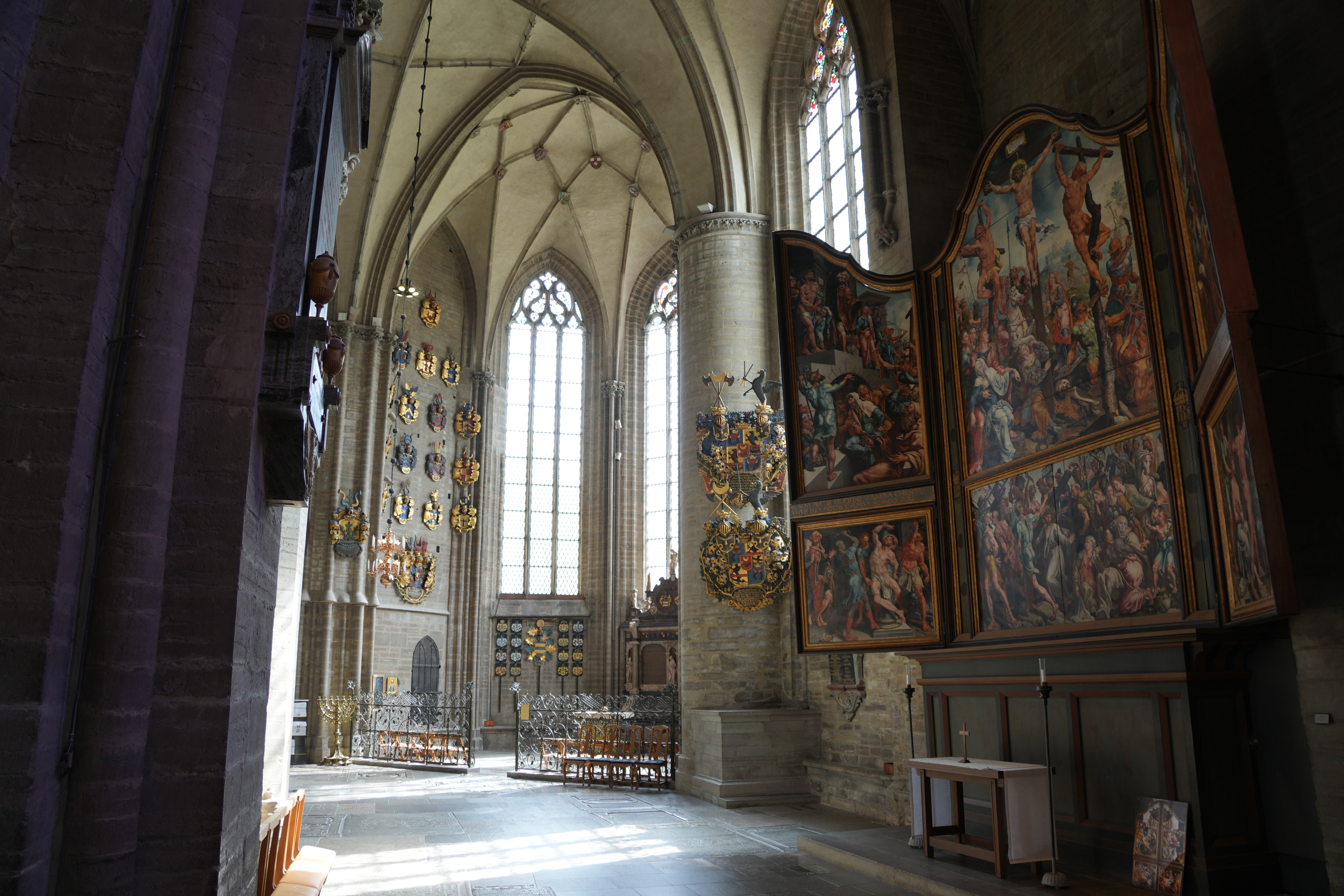
A side altar at Linköping Cathedral (Evangelical-Lutheran) in Sweden

== See also ==
- Lady chapel
