= Transgender health care misinformation =

False and misleading claims about gender diversity, gender dysphoria, and gender-affirming care have been used to justify legislative restrictions on transgender people's access to healthcare. The claims have primarily relied on manufactured uncertainty generated by various conservative religious organizations, pseudoscientific or discredited researchers, anti-trans activists and others.

Common false claims include that most people who transition regret it; that most pre-pubertal transgender children cease desiring transition after puberty; that gender dysphoria is socially contagious, can have a rapid onset, or is caused by mental illness; that medical organizations are pushing youth to transition; and that transgender youth require conversion therapies such as gender exploratory therapy.

Elected officials in Central and South America have called for legislative bans on transgender healthcare based on false claims. Misinformation has been platformed and amplified by mainstream media outlets. Medical organizations such as the Endocrine Society and American Psychological Association, among others, have released statements opposing such bans and the misinformation behind them.

== Origins ==
Transgender healthcare misinformation primarily relies on manufactured uncertainty from a network of conservative legal and advocacy organizations. These organizations have relied on techniques similar to those used in climate change denialism, generating exaggerated uncertainty around reproductive health care, conversion therapy, and gender-affirming care.

According to the Southern Poverty Law Center (SPLC), the hub of the pseudoscience movement is the Society for Evidence-Based Gender Medicine (SEGM), whose personnel have a large overlap with Genspect and Therapy First (formerly known as the Gender Exploratory Therapy Association). The SPLC has also accused the American College of Pediatricians of sharing misinformation and disinformation about trans healthcare.

A report by researchers at the Yale School of Medicine described SEGM and Genspect as spreading "biased and unscientific content", and SEGM as "without apparent ties to mainstream scientific or professional organizations". It described SEGM's 14 core members as a "small group of repeat players in anti-trans activities", who often write non-peer reviewed letters to the editor of mainstream scientific publications, and who frequently serve on the boards of other organizations which "feature biased and unscientific content".

These efforts have been aided by scientists who were once dominant in transgender care, but are now fringe, such as Ray Blanchard, Stephen B. Levine, and Kenneth Zucker. Misinformation and disinformation about transgender health care sometimes relies on biased journalism in popular media.

== Common misinformation ==
=== Detransition and transition regret ===
Detransition is the process of halting or reversing social, medical, or legal aspects of a gender transition, partially or completely. It can be temporary or permanent. Detransition and regret over transition are often erroneously conflated, though there are cases of detransition without regret and regret without detransition. Detransition also does not require a reversal of transgender identity. Prevalence of regret for receiving gender-affirming care is very low. Regarding gender-affirming surgery (GAS) in particular, a 2024 review stated, "When comparing regret after GAS to regret after other surgeries and major life decisions, the percentage of patients experiencing regret is extremely low." Data suggests that detransition—however defined—is rare, with detransition often caused by factors such as societal or familial pressure, community stigma, or financial difficulties. Studies did not control for such outside influences (which likely inflated rates of detransition) and found prevalence of discontinuation—before any treatment, while under puberty blockers, and during hormone therapy—to range 0.8–7.4%, 1–7.6%, and 1.6–9.8% respectively.

In the United States and the United Kingdom, conservative media outlets and the Alliance Defending Freedom have promoted high-profile detransitioners and advocacy groups who claim that detransition and transition regret are prevalent. The global anti-gender movement has justified anti-trans rhetoric and policies by pointing to detransitioners, arguing they prove transitioning is a hoax or necessitate protecting transgender people from medical transition, distorting the findings that detransition is rare and often caused by social pressure. States in the United States have primarily relied on anecdotes to argue that detransition is cause for bans on gender-affirming care. Detransitioner Chloe Cole has supported several such state bans as a member of the advocacy group Do No Harm. Former detransitioners Ky Schevers and Elisa Rae Shupe have detailed how they were recruited by organizations and activists who used their stories to limit transgender rights before they retransitioned and started working against them.

==== Most gender-dysphoric children will not remain transgender ====
It has been claimed that most (usually ~80%) of children with gender dysphoria or a trans identity will not identify as transgender past adolescence. The claim has been referred to as the "desistance myth". This claim is not supported by the evidence and is based on studies on "desistance" from the 1960s–80s and 2000s.

These older studies often did not clearly define desistance, and when they did, their definitions were often inconsistent with each other. Many of the earlier studies treated "gender deviant" behavior as pathological and were explicitly attempting to "cure" it. All the studies, even later studies, often had serious methodological flaws such as low sample sizes and outdated diagnostic frameworks that conflated gender non-conformity with transgender identity. Most youth sampled in these studies never identified as transgender nor desired to transition, but were counted as desisting.

The claim has often been used to support the criminalization of gender-affirming care. The term desistance was first used for trans children by Kenneth Zucker in 2003, who borrowed the term from its usage in oppositional defiance disorder; there, it is regarded as a positive outcome, a history that reflects the pathologization of transgender identities. The claim was primarily popularized in a commentary by James Cantor in 2020, who argued based on the earlier studies that most children diagnosed with gender dysphoria will grow up to be gay and lesbian adults if denied such care. The first seven studies were performed before modern diagnostic criteria and endorsed conversion therapy; the latter four predated the modern diagnostic criteria, and the latest showed that greater cross-gender identification, as opposed to behaviors, predicted ongoing transgender identity.

A 2022 systematic review found that the term was poorly defined and did not allow for dynamic or non-binary gender identities. Quantitative studies on the term were ranked as poor quality as they did not control for outside influences or explicitly define desistance. With varying implicit definitions of the term, the studies reported 83% of their total 251 participants as desisting. The systematic review concluded that "'desistance' should be removed from clinical and research frameworks, as it does not allow for the varied and complex exploration of gender that is more reflective of reality". Recent work has found that the vast majority of pre-pubertal children who express transgender identities and socially transition with parental support continue to do so in adolescence.

=== Transgender identity as a mental health condition ===
Legislative efforts to ban gender-affirming care in the United States have relied on the unfounded narrative that gender dysphoria is caused by underlying mental illness, trauma, or neurodivergence, such as autism and ADHD. Though transgender people have higher rates of mental illness, there is no evidence these cause gender dysphoria and evidence suggests this is due to minority stress and discrimination experienced by transgender people. The American Psychological Association states "misleading and unfounded narratives" such as "mischaracterizing gender dysphoria as a manifestation of traumatic stress or neurodivergence" have created a hostile environment for trans youth and led to misconceptions about the psychological and medical care they require.

==== Social contagion and rapid onset gender dysphoria ====
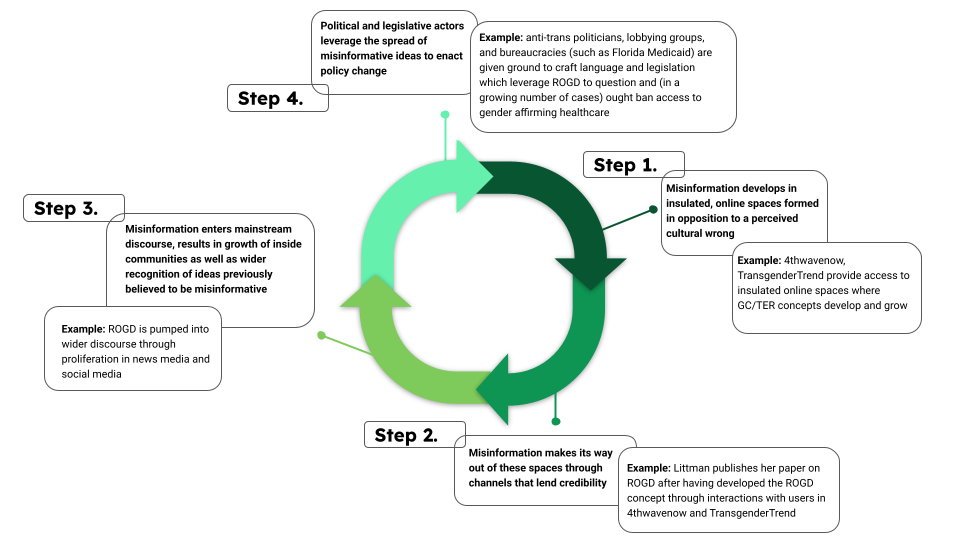
Illustration by Catherine Lockmiller of the cyclical pipeline between transgender healthcare misinformation and anti-trans legislation featuring ROGD as a case study

In 2018, Lisa Littman authored a study that has since been heavily corrected, arguing modern youth are experiencing rapid onset gender dysphoria (ROGD), a new type of gender dysphoria spread through social contagion and peer groups. The study relied on anonymous parental reports on transgender children collected from websites known for anti-trans misinformation and gender-critical politics who were informed of the study's hypothesis.

The hypothesis has been heavily referenced in discourse about transgender youth despite the absence of empirical evidence to support it. As a result, a coalition of psychological professional bodies issued a position statement calling for eliminating the use of ROGD clinically and diagnostically in 2021. It stated that "there is no evidence that ROGD aligns with the lived experiences of transgender children and adolescents" and that "the proliferation of misinformation regarding ROGD" had led to "over 100 bills under consideration in legislative bodies across the country that seek to limit the rights of transgender adolescents" predicated on ROGD's unsupported claims.

==== Psychotherapy and conversion therapy ====
Proponents of bans on gender-affirming care in the United States have argued that youth should receive psychotherapy instead of medical treatments – including gender exploratory therapy (GET), a form of conversion therapy. (Note: See:) Practitioners of GET frame medical transition as a last resort and argue that their patient's gender dysphoria may be caused by factors such as homophobia, social contagion, sexual trauma, and autism. Some practitioners avoid using their patients' chosen names and pronouns while questioning their identification.

There are no known empirical studies examining psychosocial or medical outcomes following GET. Concerns have been raised that by not providing an estimated length of time for the therapy, the delays in medical interventions may compound mental suffering in trans youth, while the gender-affirming model of care already promotes individualized care and psychotherapeutic gender identity exploration without favoring any particular identity. Bioethicist Florence Ashley has argued that framing gender exploratory therapy as an undirected exploration of underlying psychological issues bears similarities to gay conversion practices such as reparative therapy.

Multiple groups exist worldwide to promote GET and successfully influence legal discussions and clinical guidance in some regions. Therapy First (TF), previously named the Gender Exploratory Therapy Association (GETA), asserts that "psychological approaches should be the first-line treatment for all cases of gender dysphoria", that social transition is "risky", and that medical interventions for transgender youth are "experimental and should be avoided if possible". All of TF's leaders are members of Genspect, and many are also members of the Society for Evidence-Based Gender Medicine (SEGM), both of which promote GET and argue that gender-affirming care should not be available to those under 25.

=== Blanchard's transsexualism typology ===
In the 1980s and 1990s, Ray Blanchard developed a theory and typology of transfeminine people, classifying them as either "homosexual transsexuals" – straight transgender women who are alleged to be homosexual men who transitioned to seduce straight men – or "autogynephilic transsexuals", who medically transition due to an alleged sexual fantasy or fetish of being a woman. It was popularized in 2003 by J. Michael Bailey in his book The Man Who Would Be Queen and heavily promoted by the far-right Human Biodiversity Institute of which Blanchard is a member.

There is little to no evidence for the theory, and it has been criticized on numerous grounds. Blanchard did not empirically derive the subtypes; instead, he grouped trans women based on sexual orientation, disregarded their lived experiences, ignored that cisgender women also report autogynephilia, sexually objectified trans women, and assumed causality – that transgender women have gender dysphoria and desire to transition due to their fantasies – rather than their fantasies being due to their identity. Studies have criticized the conceptual flaws and empirical errors in the theory. Transfeminist Julia Serano has summarized the debate: "If proponents of autogynephilia insist that every exception to the model is due to misreporting, then autogynephilia theory must be rejected on the grounds that it is unfalsifiable and therefore unscientific. If, on the other hand, we accept that these exceptions are legitimate, then it is clear that autogynephilia theory's two-subtype taxonomy does not hold true."

=== Untrustworthiness of medical organizations ===
Though every major medical organization in the United States endorses gender-affirming care, proponents of gender-affirming care bans in the country argue that the mainstream medical community is untrustworthy, that it ignores the evidence, and that doctors are pushing transgender youth into transition due to political ideology and disregard for their well-being. This extends to claims that standards of care and clinical practice guidelines from reputable medical organizations such as WPATH and the Endocrine Society do not reflect clinical consensus.

=== Children "are transitioned" too quickly ===
Opponents of trans rights and trans healthcare have argued that gender-nonconforming youth are being pressured into transitioning. However, such care generally requires dual parental consent, a period of social transition, psychiatric assessments, and health provider approval. There are also a limited number of medical providers who provide gender-affirming care to youth. This has included claims that the medical transition of transgender youth is decided upon their own, incapable consent, though scientific literature demonstrates that clinical decisions heavily value communications with parents. This also extends to claims that minors are being given gender-affirming genital surgeries routinely. However, records of minors with such surgeries are very rare, and most of the recorded minors have been 17 years old with full parental support. Prior to the onset of puberty, children are only eligible for social transition, and puberty blockers are not given until puberty's onset.

In June 2023, the Endocrine Society released a statement emphasizing that "pediatric gender-affirming care is designed to take a conservative approach". It explained that younger children are supported in exploring their gender identity as needed. Medical interventions are reserved for older adolescents and adults, tailored individually "to maximize the time teenagers and their families have to make decisions about their transitions". They concluded that major medical organizations agree on waiting until individuals are their country's age of majority for genital surgery.

==== Schools "are transitioning" children medically ====
In 2024, then US presidential candidate Donald Trump attended a Moms for Liberty rally and stated children were being given gender-affirming surgery at school during his election campaign, and continued to repeat the claim. As of September 2024, there was no evidence that any school in the United States had provided gender-affirming surgery to a student.

=== Gender-affirming care is gay conversion therapy ===
In the late 2010s and early 2020s, misinformation that gender-affirming care is gay conversion therapy gained popularity among opponents of transgender rights, particularly gender-critical feminists and conservative and anti-trans gay people. The claims are based on misinformation that most trans children are simply just gay and only identify as transgender due to internalized homophobia, and that by allowing them to transition, their sexuality is turned from gay to straight.

=== European nations are banning gender-affirming care ===
Among anti-trans activists and Republican politicians in the United States, a common talking point used to justify outright bans on gender-affirming care for minors is the idea that other countries, particularly European countries, have banned the treatments outright. This misrepresents the cautionary stance adopted by a few European countries: some medical groups have taken a more cautionary stance, discouraging or limiting the use of puberty blockers (Note: See:) without banning or criminalizing the treatments, unlike many US states. (Note: See:)

Slate Magazine compared this to misinformation made by the anti-abortion movement in the United States, which similarly makes false claims that other countries, especially European countries, have much tighter restrictions on abortion than the United States to justify enacting bans on it. The magazine said that the point of this misinformation, for both gender-affirming care and abortion, is to paint the United States as an extreme global outlier that is "shamefully out of step with the rest of the world", which is untrue.

According to Transgender Europe, as of late 2024, two-thirds of European Union member states allow trans youth to access puberty blockers. Additionally, they noted that member states of the European Union were not moving towards bans and there was "significant disinformation around the real state of affairs" of trans-specific care, though transgender people were still often pathologized and mandated to undergo psychiatric diagnosis.

In August 2025, the Trans Journalists Association (TJA) expressed concern about the increasing amount of news coverage that was generalizing, oversimplifying or misrepresenting trans health policies in Europe. In particular, they noted that some news coverage had indicated that the European governments that are limiting access to trans healthcare are "progressive" and were acting based on insufficient evidence, rather than political motives, while framing the debate over youth gender care in Europe as "less politicized than in the United States." In fact, the debate is heavily politicized in Europe, just like in the United States, and many of the more restrictive changes in Europe were led by right-wing politicians and/or implemented under conservative governments. TJA also encouraged journalists to not cite new guidelines advising caution in some countries while ignoring developments supporting access to treatment in other countries.

==== Norway ====
Misinformation that Norway had banned gender-affirming care has proliferated on social media. In 2023, the Norwegian Healthcare Investigation Board, an independent non-governmental organization, issued a non-binding report finding the evidence for the use of puberty blockers and cross-sex hormone therapy in youth insufficient and recommended changing to a cautious approach. The board is not responsible for setting healthcare policy; the Directorate of Health, the governmental body responsible for healthcare policy in Norway, is considering but has not implemented the recommendations.

==== Sweden ====
Misinformation that Sweden had banned gender-affirming care for minors has proliferated on social media. Some Republican politicians in the United States have used this misinformation to justify their outright bans on the treatments, often citing the restriction that requires "special circumstances" to approve genital surgery in people under 23. In reality, genital surgery is rarely performed upon minors and only provided for the most severe and extraordinary cases of gender dysphoria. The restriction on genital surgery has been in place since the passage of a 1975 anti-eugenics law and does not ban transgender care.

The child and adolescent gender dysphoria KID-clinic at Sweden's Karolinska University Hospital in Stockholm announced that from May 2021 it would discontinue providing puberty blockers and cross-sex hormones to patients under 18 outside of approved clinical trials, and two other university hospitals followed suit. On February 22, 2022, Sweden's National Board of Health and Welfare released updated national guidelines that state puberty blockers, hormone treatments, and masectomies should be limited to "exceptional cases". These are recommendations and do not equate to a ban on the treatment, as physicians and clinics such as Karolinska have latitude deciding which cases qualify. Youths in need can still access gender-affirming care, albeit with long wait times. Nationwide data from the National Board of Health and Welfare released in 2026 found that the number of trans children prescribed puberty blockers in Sweden had actually slightly increased in the years since the board issued their 2022 guidelines.

==== France ====
Republican politicians have also used misinformation about the situation in France to justify their outright bans on transgender health care. They often point to guidelines from France's Académie Nationale de Médecine, developed in 2022, which urged caution when considering puberty blockers due to potential side effects, including "impact on growth, bone weakening, [and] risk of infertility". However, this is not equivalent to a ban and doctors who treat transgender youth in France say that the change to the guidelines has not changed actual practice nor has it hindered access to gender-affirming care for minors in the country. Transgender children in France are eligible for hormone treatments with parental permission, and usually receive them at age 15 or 16. Meanwhile, Transgender children in France are eligible for top surgery at age 14, and usually receive it after age 16.

In late 2024, the French Society of Pediatric Endocrinology and Diabetology released the country's first ever guidelines for medical care of trans youth, in which they recommended patients who have hit at least Tanner stage 2 to receive puberty blockers and gender-affirming hormones along with calcium and vitamin D supplements.

==== Denmark ====
In 2023, in response to an increasing number of referrals for treatment, Denmark adopted a somewhat more cautious approach to access to transgender health care, resulting in fewer trans people being able to access hormone treatment than before. However, in response to Republican politicians in the United States using misinformation about European countries to justify laws banning transgender health care for minors, Mette Ewers Haahr, the leader of Denmark's only gender clinic for transgender youth, clarified that "We haven't banned the treatment", further stating that treatments should weigh both patient safety and human rights. Transgender children in Denmark can still access gender-affirming care with parental consent starting at age 10 and starting at age 15 without parental consent.

==== Finland ====
In 2023, misinformation spread online that Finland had banned gender-affirming care for minors. This misinformation cites guidelines in Finland, created by the Council for Choices in Health Care in 2020, which prioritized psychotherapy over medical transition. However, these guidelines are a recommendation, not a mandate, and they also recommend that cross sex hormones be considered for transgender minors "if it can be ascertained that their identity as the other sex is of a permanent nature and causes severe dysphoria." Additionally, The Council for Choices in Health Care recommends the use of puberty blockers in transgender children after a case-by-case assessment if there are no medical contraindications. Transgender minors in Finland can still access gender-affirming care at one of the country's two centralized gender identity units for minors.

==== The Netherlands ====
In 2023, misinformation spread online that the Netherlands had banned gender-affirming care for minors. Dutch medical guidelines recommend the use of puberty blockers in transgender adolescents of at least Tanner Stage II with informed consent and approval of an endocrinologist. Top surgery is also available to patients older than 16 in The Netherlands.

== Impact ==
=== Legislative impacts ===
==== Australia ====
Australian legislators and media have increasingly spread misinformation and disinformation about detransition rates since 2022, relying on the efforts of apparently astroturfed organizations such as Genspect and the Society for Evidence-Based Gender Medicine and local groups such as Binary Australia and the Australian Christian Lobby.

==== Latin America ====
Mexican federal deputy Teresa Castell of the conservative National Action Party had repeatedly claimed that gender dysphoria resulted from mental illness or perversion and required psychological treatment. One party deputy pushed an initiative to ban transgender healthcare for minors and criminalize pressure from "an adult for the determination of sexual identity ... contrary to their biological identity" arguing that minors are incapable of knowing their gender identity.

In late September 2024, Colombian far-right groups and organizers who successfully lobbied against a national ban on conversion therapy spread a hoax that their Superintendent of Health had promoted genital surgeries for three-year-olds. Despite fact-checking from independent reporters, the President (Gustavo Petro) and the Superintendent of Health (Luis Carlos Leal), the hoax has continued to be popular.

In November 2024, many Brazilian politicians and political candidates relied on anti-trans rhetoric and misinformation during their elections, including claims that transgender children do not exist or are being co-opted into being trans by advocacy organizations.

==== United Kingdom ====
In 2021, NHS England commissioned the Cass Review, an independent review of gender identity services for children and young people. The review's final report (published April 2024) recommended tighter restrictions on gender-affirming care, such as limiting puberty blockers to clinical trials, stating the evidence in favor of them was limited.

The Cass Review was welcomed by part of the UK's medical establishment, though some professional organizations, transgender health providers, and LGBTQ rights groups criticized the findings both in the UK and internationally. (Note: See:) The review process was criticized for lack of transparency and exclusion of transgender expertise. (Note: See:) The review was also criticized for allegedly pathologizing language in its report, its claims that most pre-pubertal children with gender incongruence desist, its endorsement of gender exploratory therapy, and implying poor mental health causes children to be transgender.

The review's author Hilary Cass said some organisations and individuals had "deliberately spread misinformation" about the way it had evaluated scientific studies, including claims that her review had ignored 98% of the available evidence, both before and after the final report was published. Amnesty International UK also criticized "sensationalized coverage" of the review, stating it was "being weaponized by people who revel in spreading disinformation and myths about healthcare for trans young people". UK charity Mermaids said that the Cass Review had been misrepresented in the press as supporting a ban on transition.

In June 2026, in the midst of a pressure campaign by some politicians calling for the proposed clinical trial into puberty blockers to be scrapped, Cass said in an interview with BBC that she believes that since her review was published, the risks about puberty blockers had been "exaggerated" and that "we genuinely don't know if there are harms" and that a clinical trial was "essential" to figure out "whether these drugs are helpful or not".

==== United States ====
Map of US state laws regarding trans healthcare access for youth as of March 8, 2025 based on data from Movement Advancement Project

Misinformation and disinformation have led to proposed and successful legislative restrictions on gender-affirming care across the United States. As of November 1, 2024, 26 states in the United States have passed bans on gender-affirming care for minors while 16 have passed shield laws and executive access protecting such care.

In December 2024, the Supreme Court of the United States considered United States v. Skrmetti, a case on the constitutionality of Tennessee's ban on gender-affirming care for minors. Multiple doctors, such as Stephen B. Levine and James Cantor, who courts previously dismissed for promoting misinformation about transgender healthcare, testified in support of the ban together with various SPLC-designated anti-LGBTQ groups.

In May 2025, the US Department of Health and Human Services released an anonymously authored report on treatments for gender dysphoria in minors that had been commissioned 90 days earlier, as part of Trump's Executive Order 14187 that had ordered the department to revoke federal funding for transgender healthcare and reshape public health policy to align with the administration. The report, which said that gender-affirming care was unsafe and endorsed gender exploratory therapy instead, was criticized by many national and international medical organizations. Trans advocates and medical experts described it as misinformation.

=== Media impact ===
Mainstream media outlets such as The Atlantic, Washington Post, and The New York Times (NYT) have been criticized by scholar Thomas J. Billard, WPATH and USPATH, Vox, and others for platforming and amplifying misinformation, (Note: See:) with particular criticism of the NYT's coverage of transgender healthcare. (Note: See:) In November 2022, WPATH released a public statement criticizing misinformation in a commentary from the NYT. In February 2023, over 1000 NYT contributors signed an open letter criticizing the paper's coverage, which was signed by an additional 30,000 supporters within a week. They argued the paper "treated gender diversity with an eerily familiar mix of pseudoscience and euphemistic, charged language, while publishing reporting on trans children that omits relevant information about its sources". They noted how its articles had been used to support anti-trans healthcare bans. A second letter from GLAAD, signed by over 100 LGBTQ and civil rights groups including the Human Rights Campaign and PFLAG, was released the same day, arguing that the NYT platformed fringe theories and "dangerous inaccuracies".

=== Bomb threats against Boston Children's Hospital ===
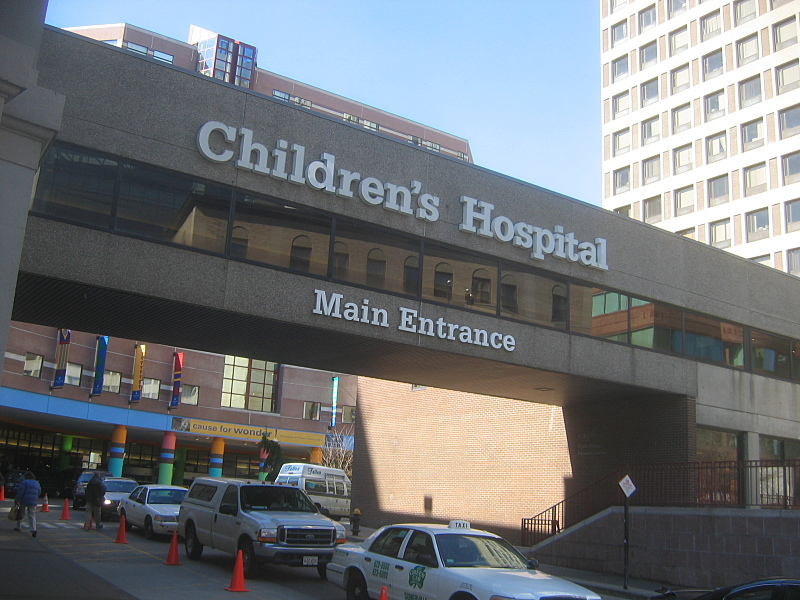
Boston Children's Hospital was subject to bomb threats following disinformation about the hospital's gender-affirming care.

In August 2022, Chaya Raichik, owner of the far-right social media account Libs of TikTok, claimed that Boston Children's Hospital (BCH) and Children's National Hospital (CNH) were providing gender-affirming bottom surgeries to minors. With the BCH-related content, Raichik included a BCH video that featured one of the hospital's gynecologists explaining the procedure. While USA Today, NPR, and PolitiFact concluded that the BCH claim was false, several conservative outlets—including The Daily Caller and The Post Millennial—republished the claims. After the Libs of TikTok posts, both hospitals faced harassment of employees and bomb threats, (Note: For BCH bomb threats, see: For CNH bomb threats, see:) though it was unclear whether the BCH threat was related to the harassment. NBC News described Libs of TikTok as "one of the primary drivers of the harassment campaign" against BCH.

== Responses from medical organizations ==
In June 2023, The Endocrine Society released a press release stating "widespread misinformation about medical care for transgender and gender-diverse teens" had resulted in 18 US states banning such care, including for adults. They stated: "These policies do not reflect the research landscape. More than 2,000 scientific studies have examined aspects of gender-affirming care since 1975, including more than 260 studies cited in the Endocrine Society's Clinical Practice Guideline [on transgender medicine]." The American Academy of Pediatrics, the American College of Obstetricians and Gynecologists, the American Urological Association, the American Society for Reproductive Medicine, the American College of Physicians, the American Association of Clinical Endocrinology, GLMA: Health Professionals Advancing LGBTQ+ Equality, the American Medical Association (AMA), and the AMA's Medical Student Section cosponsored an Endocrine Society resolution "opposing any criminal and legal penalties against patients seeking gender-affirming care, family members or guardians who support them in seeking medical care, and health care facilities and clinicians who provide gender-affirming care". The AMA passed the resolution.

In February 2024, the American Psychological Association released a policy statement urging the stopping of the spread of disinformation with more abundant and easily accessible scientific research, describing it as essential for protecting access to gender-affirming healthcare. It further stated:

[T]he spread of misleading and unfounded narratives that mischaracterize gender dysphoria and affirming care, likely resulting in further stigmatization, marginalization, and lack of access to psychological and medical supports for transgender, gender diverse, and nonbinary individuals [...] [T]he APA opposes state bans on gender-affirming care, which are contrary to the principles of evidence-based healthcare, human rights, and social justice, and which should be reconsidered in favor of policies that prioritize the well-being and autonomy of transgender, gender-diverse, and nonbinary individuals[.]

In December 2024, the National Advisory Commission on Biomedical Ethics in Switzerland said that public outrage over gender-affirming care, often stimulated by people without the necessary knowledge and experience, was harming young people and impeding "objective and evidence-based discussion of the social and medical framework required to ensure that they receive the best possible support and care".

== See also ==
- Anti-LGBTQ rhetoric
- Evaluation of Transsexual Surgery
- Misinformation about violence by transgender people
- Transphobia
  - Transphobia in the United States
  - Transphobia in the United Kingdom
- 2020s anti-LGBTQ movement in the United States
