= Trump administration HHS gender dysphoria report =

2025 report by the United States Department of Health

Treatment for Pediatric Gender Dysphoria: Review of Evidence and Best Practices
- Created: May 1, 2025
- Commissioned by: Donald Trump's Executive Order 14187
- Subject: Transgender health care for minors

Official website
- opa.hhs.gov/gender-dysphoria-report

Full text
- File:Treatment for Pediatric Gender Dysphoria.pdf at Wikisource

Treatment for Pediatric Gender Dysphoria: Review of Evidence and Best Practices is a report published on May 1, 2025, by the United States Department of Health and Human Services (HHS). It was produced at the direction of President Donald Trump's Executive Order 14187 which explicitly called for limiting access to gender-affirming care for young people. The report was characterized by the American Academy of Pediatrics as "misrepresent[ing] the current medical consensus".

The names of the authors of the report were not disclosed until November 19, 2025; the American Psychological Association characterized this conduct as "... undermin[ing] scientific rigor and contradict[ing] standards for evidence-based policymaking". When the authors were revealed, many were found to be prominent anti-transgender activists who had previously testified in favor of anti-transgender legislation, are affiliated with various anti-LGBT and religious groups and consisted of what Meredithe McNamara of Yale School of Medicine called "a cottage industry that solely exists to dismantle health care for a vulnerable group of people".

The report promotes gender exploratory therapy, a form of conversion therapy intended to delay or prevent gender transition. Advocates as well as medical and psychological experts have said that the report contains misinformation about transgender health care.

The report drew immediate criticism from LGBTQ advocacy groups and medical professionals, with the American Psychiatric Association saying that "its underlying methodology lacks sufficient transparency and clarity for its findings to be taken at face value".

== Background ==
On January 28, 2025, President Trump signed Executive Order 14187, "Protecting Children from Chemical and Surgical Mutilation", which directed the HHS to oppose the WPATH standards of care, cease all support for transition of transgender people under the age of 19, and cut federal funding for hospitals that offer transition-related treatments. Because of this, the administration has been noted to have had a predetermined conclusion about gender-affirming care for minors as the executive order called the treatment "blatant harm" and a "stain on our nation's history". The order was released one week into Trump's second term, as part of a series of policies targeting LGBTQ rights and transgender healthcare and gave the HHS just 90 days to complete the report.

Beginning on January 31, 2025, agencies and research institutions under the purview of the HHS were ordered to remove content with "forbidden terms", including "gender, transgender, pregnant person, pregnant people, LGBT, transsexual, non-binary, nonbinary, assigned male at birth, assigned female at birth, biologically male, biologically female". Editors of The BMJ (a British medical journal) published an opinion article in reaction to the order, stating that medical journal editors should resist the US government's order to retract scientific papers for containing certain words. The European Journal of Public Health published an editorial in agreement with The BMJ. Researchers have criticized the Trump administration for censorship of science, and a letter signed by "nearly 2,000 leading scientists" argued this created a "climate of fear" in scientific fields.

Various organizations, including the World Professional Association for Transgender Health (WPATH), American Academy of Pediatrics, and American Medical Association, support access to gender-affirming care for youth.

== Report ==
The report is limited to children, and does not address treatment for adults. HHS said its report is not clinical guidance and does not make any policy recommendations. In a press release, the HHS highlighted that the report's authors would be confidential.

The report is around 400 pages and outlined 17 systematic reviews which studied the outcomes of gender-affirming care in minors, but also excluded "thousands of others for not meeting study criteria – including some excluded for publication bias."

The report claims that gender-affirming care is experimental without evidence of benefits, and that treatments such as puberty blockers and gender-affirming hormone therapy are unethical interventions pushed by activists. It supports gender exploratory therapy, generally considered a form of conversion therapy, as the only safe treatment for gender dysphoria and argues it is not the same as conversion therapy. The report states that medical groups support medical treatment over psychological treatment due to a "mischaracterization of such approaches as 'conversion therapy'", and states that "[p]sychotherapy is a noninvasive alternative to endocrine and surgical interventions for the treatment of pediatric gender dysphoria." Additionally, it promotes misinformation about rapid-onset gender dysphoria, a scientifically unsupported hypothesis that transgender identity can be caused by a social contagion. The report also lists autism as a possible cause of transgender identity, citing sources such as gender exploratory therapist Kenneth Zucker.

The report references controversial sources, including the UK's Cass Review, which it cites 149 times, as well as publications by Society for Evidence-Based Gender Medicine (SEGM), journalist Jesse Singal, and SEGM member Lisa Marchiano. Them writer Samantha Riedel described the report as citing "debunked and discredited anti-transgender sources". It also deadnames and misgenders transgender historical figures such as Lili Elbe and Christine Jorgensen.

During a press conference at the White House following the report's release, Stephen Miller, the White House Deputy Chief of Staff, called gender-affirming care "barbaric", further stating that "[t]hey violate all sound medical ethics. They are completely unwarranted. They harm children for life irreversibly. It is child torture. It is child abuse. It is medical malpractice."

=== Post-publication review and author reveal ===
The authors of the report were not initially named in the report and following the report's release, the HHS declined to identify them. Following the first release of the report on May 1, 2025, HHS had only referred to the authors as "eight scholars including doctors, ethicists and a methodologist who represent a wide range of political viewpoints", and that names were withheld "in order to help maintain the integrity" during post-publication peer-review.

On June 26, 2025, Alex Byrne, a philosophy professor at MIT, wrote an opinion article in The Washington Post claiming to be one of the authors, but did not identify the other eight authors he said were involved in the report.

On November 19, 2025, the HHS re-released the review with a few minor differences and a handful of peer review comments. However, the updated report still comes to the same conclusion as the earlier version. The new report also revealed the names of the authors and their affiliations to be:

- Evgenia Abbruzzese, co-founder of the Society for Evidence-Based Gender Medicine (SEGM)
- Alex Byrne, of the Massachusetts Institute of Technology
- Farr Curlin, of Duke University
- Moti Gorin, of Colorado State University
- Kristopher Kaliebe, of the University of South Florida
- Michael Laidlaw, an endocrinologist in California
- Kathleen McDeavitt, of Baylor College of Medicine
- Leor Sapir, of the Manhattan Institute for Policy Research
- Yuan Zhang, founder of Evidence Bridge

The new updated report immediately attracted criticism from medical professionals and LGBTQ+ rights groups since many of the authors and multiple of the peer reviewers are outspoken opponents of gender-affirming care and have little or no experience working with trans people. Some had also been paid to speak, consult, or testify in favor of banning gender-affirming care. All of the authors are also affiliated with one or more of the following anti-LGBTQ+ or religious groups: Alliance Defending Freedom, American College of Pediatricians, the Society for Evidence-Based Gender Medicine (SEGM), Do No Harm, Moms for Liberty, the Family Research Council, Women's Liberation Front or Genspect, all of which are classified as hate groups by the Southern Poverty Law Center (SPLC). One of the authors, Laidlaw, had been cited by the June 2025 United States Supreme Court in the case United States v. Skrmetti to defend upholding state bans on gender-affirming care.

Most of the peer reviewers agreed with the report's conclusions overall, but some pointed out methodological flaws. One of the peer reviewers Jilles Smids, said that while the report gives a "well-argued analysis", "it is clearly not a neutral report" and that it "decidedly argues against early medical intervention for minors". Another peer reviewer, Richard J. Santen said he used Google Gemini to come up with his review. While Santen said the report makes a "strong case" for gender-affirming care being experimental, he also believed "this conclusion can reasonably be disagreed upon".

In response to the reveal of the authors, Scott Leibowitz, a child and adolescent psychiatrist, said "Now we know why the authors were previously kept anonymous" and said "Reports focused on transgender and gender diverse individuals, especially those commissioned by the U.S. government, should be authored by experts who have dedicated their careers to serving the patient population. Regrettably, this is one of the only fields in medicine where having experience and understanding the complexities are viewed as deterrents rather than assets." Meredithe McNamara of Yale School of Medicine described the list of authors as "engineers of a cottage industry that solely exists to dismantle health care for a vulnerable group of people". The Human Rights Campaign called the updated report a "sham" and "a political document".

The American Medical Association (AMA) and the American Academy of Pediatrics (AAP) released a joint statement condemning the updated report and denying accusations that gender-affirming care is "negligent or ideologically driven" and particularly took issue with "the false assertion that our members have committed 'malpractice' or betrayed their oath in any way". They also claimed these accusations were "rooted in politics and partisanship, misrepresent the consensus of medical science, undermine the professionalism of physicians, and risk harming vulnerable young people and their families". Physicians for Reproductive Health president Dr. Jamila Perritt, OB/GYN, released a statement criticizing the report calling it "pseudoscience" and "grounded in hateful ideological language".

The HHS Assistant Secretary for Health Brian Christine, released a statement saying the updated report is "an urgent wake-up call to doctors and parents about the clear dangers of trying to turn girls into boys and vice-versa". NIH Director Jay Bhattacharya released a statement saying the updated report "meticulously documents the risks the profession has imposed on vulnerable children. At the NIH, we are committed to ensuring that science, not ideology, guides America's medical research" and HHS Secretary Robert F. Kennedy Jr. heavily criticized major medical associations for supporting gender-affirming care, saying that they "peddled the lie that chemical and surgical sex-rejecting procedures could be good for children", and were committing malpractice.

== Reception ==
=== LGBTQ rights organizations ===
Shannon Minter, legal director of the National Center for Lesbian Rights, said the report "seeks to erase decades of research and learning, replacing it with propaganda". The Trevor Project director Casey Pick warned that it could endanger transgender youth. GLAAD CEO Sarah Kate Ellis said that the report is "grossly misleading and in direct contrast to the recommendation of every leading health authority in the world".

Advocates for Trans Equality's health policy analyst, Sinead Murano Kinney, called the report "a willful distortion of medical evidence intended to stoke fear about a field of safe and effective medicine that has existed for decades" and said the report is meant to "justify dangerous practices which amount to conversion therapy".

=== Medical professionals ===
==== Organizations ====
The American Medical Association rejected the review, saying that its claims are "rooted in politics and partisanship, misrepresent the consensus of medical science, undermine the professionalism of physicians, and risk harming vulnerable young people and their families".

The American Academy of Pediatrics swiftly rejected the review as "bypassing medical expertise and scientific evidence" in a manner comparable to anti-vaccine activism. The AAP also criticized the HHS for not consulting any major medical organizations for the review and misrepresenting their policies on gender affirming care.

The American Academy of Family Physicians, the American Academy of Pediatrics, the American College of Obstetricians and Gynecologists, the American College of Physicians, the American Osteopathic Association and the American Psychiatric Association released a joint statement opposing "any legislation, regulation, or executive action that interferes in the confidential relationship between a patient and their physician or undermines the provision of evidence-based standards".

The American Psychological Association released a statement saying it "supports access to psychological care and evidence-based treatment for treatment for transgender, gender-diverse and nonbinary children, teens and adults" and condemned the report's support of conversion therapy, saying "Psychotherapeutic treatment for transgender and nonbinary youth should aim to help children and adolescents explore and understand, rather than change, their gender identity."

The World Professional Association for Transgender Health (WPATH) and United States Professional Association for Transgender Health (USPATH) released a joint statement saying they are "deeply concerned" about the HHS report, which they say "misrepresents existing research and disregards the expertise of professionals who have been working with transgender and gender-diverse youth for decades".

The Endocrine Society initially released a statement saying it was reviewing the report, but continues to "believe in access to health care, and that medical decisions should be made by the clinician and the patient's family based on scientific evidence" as opposed to bans by politicians. On May 29, 2025, The Endocrine Society responded to the report by saying their guideline development process "adheres to the highest standards of trustworthiness and transparence" and "The widely accepted view of the professional medical community is that medical treatment is appropriate for transgender and gender-diverse teenagers who experience persistent feelings of gender dysphoria. Medical studies show that access to this care improves the well-being of transgender and nonbinary people".

In February 2026, the American Society of Plastic Surgeons (ASPS) issued a position statement containing a blanket recommendation against gender-affirming surgery for patients under the age of 19. In doing so, it heavily cited the Trump administration HHS gender dysphoria report and the Cass Review, which did not cover surgeries and has also been criticized for spreading misinformation about gender-affirming care. The decision was lauded by the Trump administration including HHS leaders Robert F. Kennedy Jr., Jim O'Neill, Mehmet Oz and Mike Stuart. However, ASPS stopped short of issuing new clinical practice guidelines. They also added that they were opposed to governments banning gender-affirming surgery, saying that "regulation of medical care is best achieved through professional self-regulation, rather than criminal law or punitive legislative approaches." Additionally, ASPS said they would be open to revisiting and re assessing the position in the future "should the evidence base evolve to demonstrate clear benefit with acceptable risk". The statement was criticized by other major medical associations and transgender advocates, who said there is "no definitive age or one-size-fits-all approach for every patient" and emphasized that care should be delivered in case-by-case assessments rather than blanket opposition. In March, it was revealed that representatives for the ASPS and several other medical organizations had met with Dr. Mehmet Oz, a member of the Trump administration who vehemently opposes gender-affirming care prior to the release of their new statement. During the meeting, Dr. Oz attempted to pressure the organizations to abandon their support for gender-affirming care. The Society for Evidence-Based Gender Medicine (SEGM), a group that advocates against gender affirming care, and Kathleen McDeavitt, a co-author of the HHS report, also gave a presentation at the meeting. This led to speculation and accusations that the statement may have been influenced by the Trump administration, although the ASPS denies this.

==== Individuals ====
Dr. Meera Shah, a physician and a board member for the Physicians for Reproductive Health, said that "medical professionals do not question the safety of this care". Shah further stated that "The fact that this was published by a government agency is really scary. The way that it's written is very harmful, and it's very obvious that this is all politically driven and not rooted in fact or science. People tend to trust government. They think government agencies are out to protect people and to help people, so the default is to believe what they say."

Jack Drescher, a New York psychiatrist who contributed to DSM-5 and ICD-11 guidance on gender dysphoria, said the report "magnifies the risks of treatments while minimizing benefits of the treatments".

Erica Anderson, a child psychologist who has been critical of gender-affirming care for minors in the past, praised the report's conclusions, but also said "it was impossible to ignore the inflammatory executive order that led to the report".

Kellan Baker, who studies transgender healthcare at Whitman-Walker Health said "the report was a departure from how health policy had typically been shaped in the United States. It is important that medicine be practiced by those with expertise in it, by trained clinicians operating according to standards of care that are set out by their respective medical fields – not by the federal government." Baker also expressed concern that the report would be used by the government to justify more restrictions on gender-affirming care.

Sean Cahill, the director of health policy research at the Fenway Health, criticized the report saying it "either downplays or dismisses studies that have found that access to these treatments leads to improved mental health. The report also claims these treatments are associated with significant harms even though it found 'sparse' to no evidence of such harm."

Alex Dworak, a family medicine physician in Nebraska who treats transgender patients, said the report "contains inaccuracies, misleading language, and misrepresentations" of the care he provides his patients. Dworak points out that the report claims "[that] no independent association between gender dysphoria and suicidality has been found" – which Dworak calls "flatly incorrect", citing a systematic review that found the opposite.

=== Academics and researchers ===
Doug Haldeman, a psychologist and professor of clinical psychology at John F. Kennedy University who is the author of "The Case Against Conversion 'Therapy': Evidence, Ethics, and Alternatives", criticized the report for attempting to claim exploratory therapy is not conversion therapy: "This is the argument they have been using for decades, and really it's conversion therapy ... We are in an era where the administration has made it clear from the very first day that their wish is to erase trans identity altogether." Haldeman also said "there is years of research showing that trying to get trans people to 'accept' their birth sex has negative mental health outcomes."

Daniel Aaron, a physician and associate professor of law at University of Utah, called the report "marked with the signature of politics, which is antithetical to the way that science is normally conducted".

Gordon Guyatt, a professor of medicine and expert in research methods at McMaster University in Canada who was one of the key developers of the GRADE approach, said the report "accurately classifies the evidence around gender-affirming care for youth as low or very low in certainty, but that its discussion of ethical issues was unbalanced". Guyatt clarified the report "suggests that adolescents should be denied the gender affirming therapies under consideration and that people shouldn't be allowed to do research to address the possible outcomes. This seems unbalanced to me and raises the issue of how this report came about, how the team that put together the report was chosen, and the influence that players in the current administration had on the report."

Arjee Restar, a social and legal epidemiologist at Yale University, criticized the report for denying that exploratory therapy is the same as conversion therapy, saying "The report's framing of psychotherapy as an alternative to medical affirmation – especially in a way that delays or discourages access to competent gender-affirming care providers – echoes the same ideology and pathologizing practices that underpinned past conversion therapy practices."

Meredithe McNamara, an assistant professor of pediatrics at the Yale School of Medicine, criticized the report for concealing the names of the authors, saying the HHS's excuse that this was done to "maintain the integrity of this process" is "simply nonsense". McNamara further said: "That's not how scientific integrity works. If people are not willing to put their names on it, then it should not be taken seriously."

=== Other organizations ===
Harry Dayantis, a spokesman for the Cochrane Collaboration, an international nonprofit organization that makes what scientists consider the premier systematic literature reviews, criticized the lack of transparency regarding the authors of the report, saying "the lack of disclosure prohibits an assessment of possible conflicts of interests". Dayantis additionally criticized the conclusion of the report for not being supported by the report itself, saying the conclusion refers to "a growing body of evidence pointing to significant risks", but the report itself says evidence of harms in systematic reviews is "sparse", theorizing that it's too soon to identify the harms because widespread use of transition care is recent.

The Autistic Self Advocacy Network released a statement that the report's hypothesis that autism causes transgender identities is false and linked to the history of conversion therapy and applied behavioral analysis. They said "The report repeatedly implies that autism is a root cause of gender dysphoria, quoting known conversion therapy practitioners to do so" and that it "clearly dehumanizes both trans and autistic people. The suggestion that being trans comes secondary to being autistic is meant to discredit the real experiences of both autistic and non-autistic trans youth."

Roger Severino, vice president of the conservative think tank The Heritage Foundation, commended the report and reprimanded what he called "profit-seeking doctors and ideological groups" for convincing families that a child's sex "is whatever they say it is".

Stanley Goldfarb, chairman of Do No Harm, an organization which advocates for bans on gender-affirming care, praised the report saying, "It is clearer now more than ever that we must end this misguided practice and replace it with evidence-based treatment for gender-confused kids."

The president of the Christian legal group Alliance Defending Freedom, Kristen Waggoner, applauded the report, saying that it "... should lead to the closure of every gender clinic in America. Doctors who perpetrate these experiments on children should lose their medical licenses and be sued for damages."

== See also ==
- 2020s anti-LGBTQ movement in the United States
- Evaluation of Transsexual Surgery (1981)
- Cass Review – a similar report by NHS England
- MAHA report — another HHS report in the Trump administration
