= Alex Byrne (philosopher) =

Professor of philosophy

Alexander Byrne (born 1960) is a British philosopher. He is Laurance S. Rockefeller Professor of Philosophy at the Massachusetts Institute of Technology. In 2014, he was awarded a Senior Fellowship of the Zukunftskolleg at the University of Konstanz. His work on transgender topics has been controversial.

== Education and career ==
Bryne earned his Ph.D. in philosophy from Princeton University in 1994. His doctoral dissertation at Princeton, completed under philosophers David Lewis and Mark Johnston, was titled, "The Emergent mind". He was an assistant professor of philosophy at MIT from 1995 to 1999, an associate professor of philosophy at MIT from 1999 to 2002, and became a full professor at MIT in 2006.

== Writing ==
In 2023, Byrne authored the book Trouble with Gender: Sex Facts, Gender Fictions, which covers the subject of transgender identity. The original publisher, Oxford University Press, declined publishing the book after reading the manuscript, claiming Byrne did not address the subject of gender in "a sufficiently serious or respectful way." The book was instead published by Polity Press.

In a 2024 New York Times op-ed with his wife, evolutionary biologist Carole Hooven, the pair criticized the increasingly common phrase "sex assigned at birth", arguing "sex is a fundamental biological feature with significant consequences for our species, so there are costs to misconceptions about it".

On June 26, 2025, Byrne wrote an opinion article in The Washington Post identifying himself as one of the authors of the Donald Trump administration's controversial report on gender-affirming care for minors. The HHS did not identify the authors in the report itself, and in his article, Byrne did not identify any of the eight other authors he said were involved. The report was re-released with minor revisions and peer review comments on November 19, 2025, naming Byrne and the report's other authors.

== Books ==
- Trouble With Gender: Sex Facts, Gender Fictions (Polity, 2023)
- Transparency and Self-Knowledge (Oxford University Press, 2018)

=== Editor ===
- with David R. Hilbert Readings on Color, Volume 1: The Philosophy of Color (MIT Press, 1997)
- with David R. Hilbert Readings on Color, Vol. 2: The Science of Color (MIT Press, 1997)
- Fact and Value (2001)
