= Munich-style stained glass =

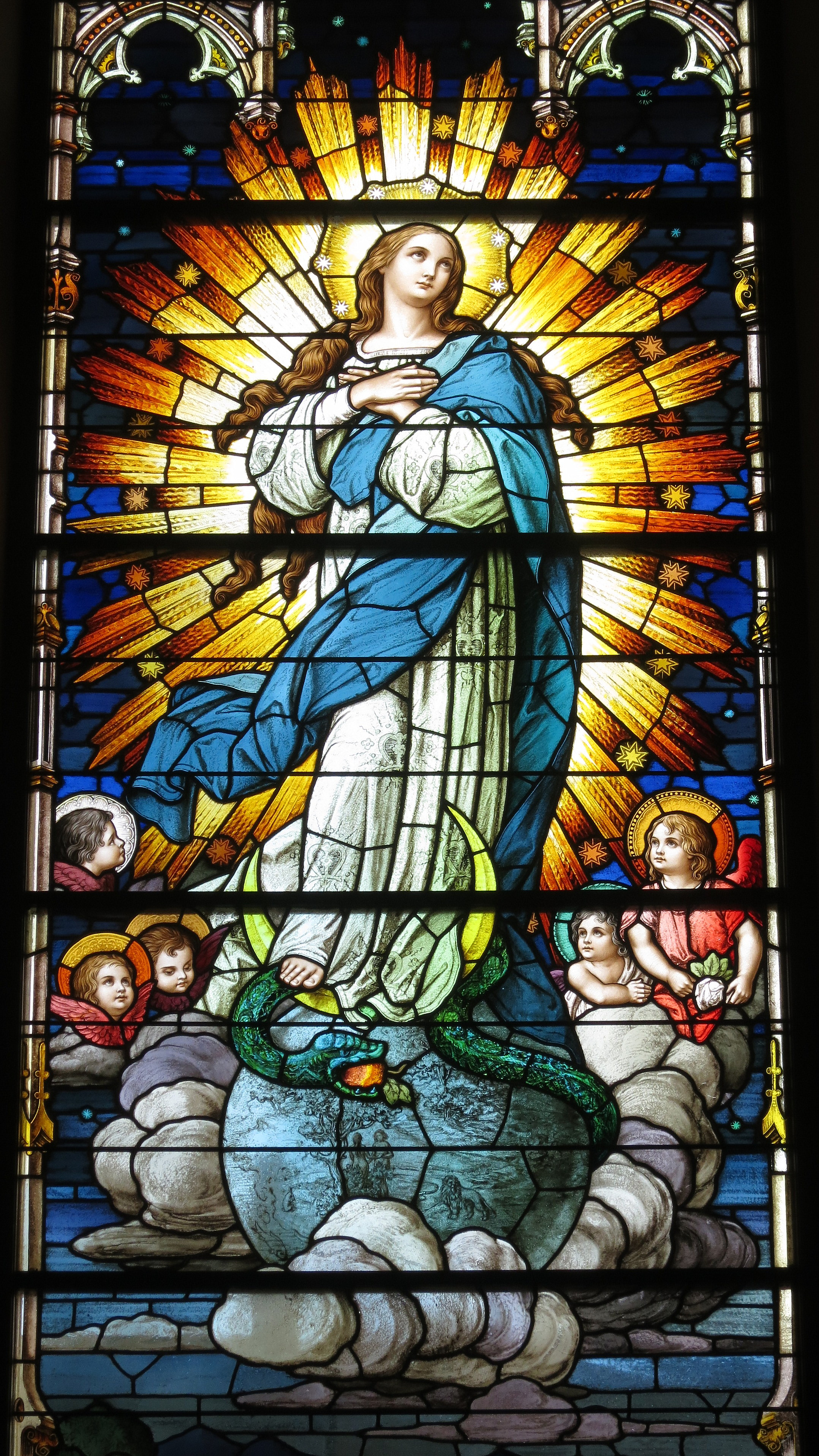
Munich-style stained glass window of the Immaculate Conception by. F.X. Zettler. It is located in Saint Stephen Church (Hamilton, Ohio).

Munich-style stained glass was produced in the Royal Bavarian Stained Glass Manufactory, Munich, in the mid-19th century.

King Ludwig I opened the glassworks in 1827 which continued production of high quality glass until the early 20th century. Franz Xaver Zettler headed the operation for much of this time. Together with his major competitor, Franz Mayer of the Royal Art Institute, these stained-glass artists developed the so-called "Munich style" of expert painting on relatively large glass panels (as opposed to the medieval technique of smaller pieces of colored glass held in a leaded framework, later adapted and modified by the great American designer Louis Comfort Tiffany).

Around 1862 the Franz Mayer of Munich Company started with stained glass paintings influenced by the "Royal Bavarian Stained Glass Establishment". Their tendency was to create a picture-like composition similar to late Gothic paintings and Renaissance altars. The paintings were detailed. The style by Mayer and Zettler became known as "Munich style" and went back to the traditional roots. Small colored glass pieces were coated with overlay color, tracing lines and melting colors before being fired and leaded. The work by Peter Hemel von Andlau or Hans Holbein the Elder set the standard for Mayer and Zettler and became the base of their work.
