= German Village Historic District =

Historic district in Ohio, United States

Coordinates: 39°24′12″N 84°33′33″W

- U.S. National Register of Historic Places
- U.S. Historic district
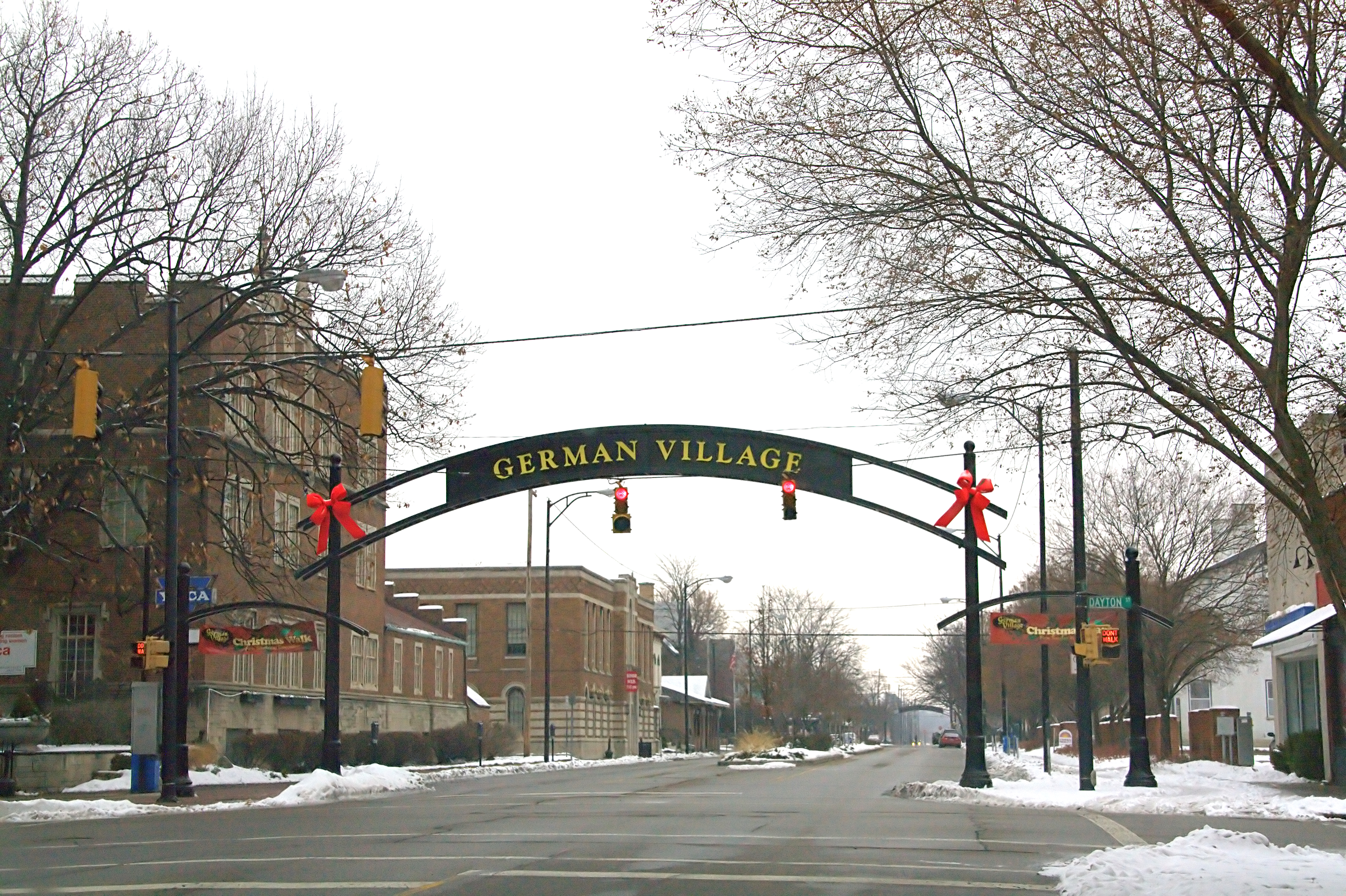

- Location within Ohio Location within the United States
- Location: Hamilton, Ohio
- Area: 450 acres (1.8 km^{2})
- Architectural style: Gothic Revival, Italianate and Queen Anne
- NRHP reference No.: 90002216
- Added to NRHP: 1991-02-07

German Village Historic District is a registered historic district in Hamilton, Ohio, listed in the National Register of Historic Places on February 7, 1991. It contains 177 contributing buildings.

German Village contains many community landmarks; these include the octagonal Lane-Hooven House, the Lane Public Library, St. Julie Billart Catholic Church, the Hamilton YWCA, and the Butler County Historical Society.

== Historic uses ==
- Single Dwelling
- Specialty Store
- School
