= St. Stephen Church and Rectory =

Historic church in Ohio, United States

- U.S. National Register of Historic Places
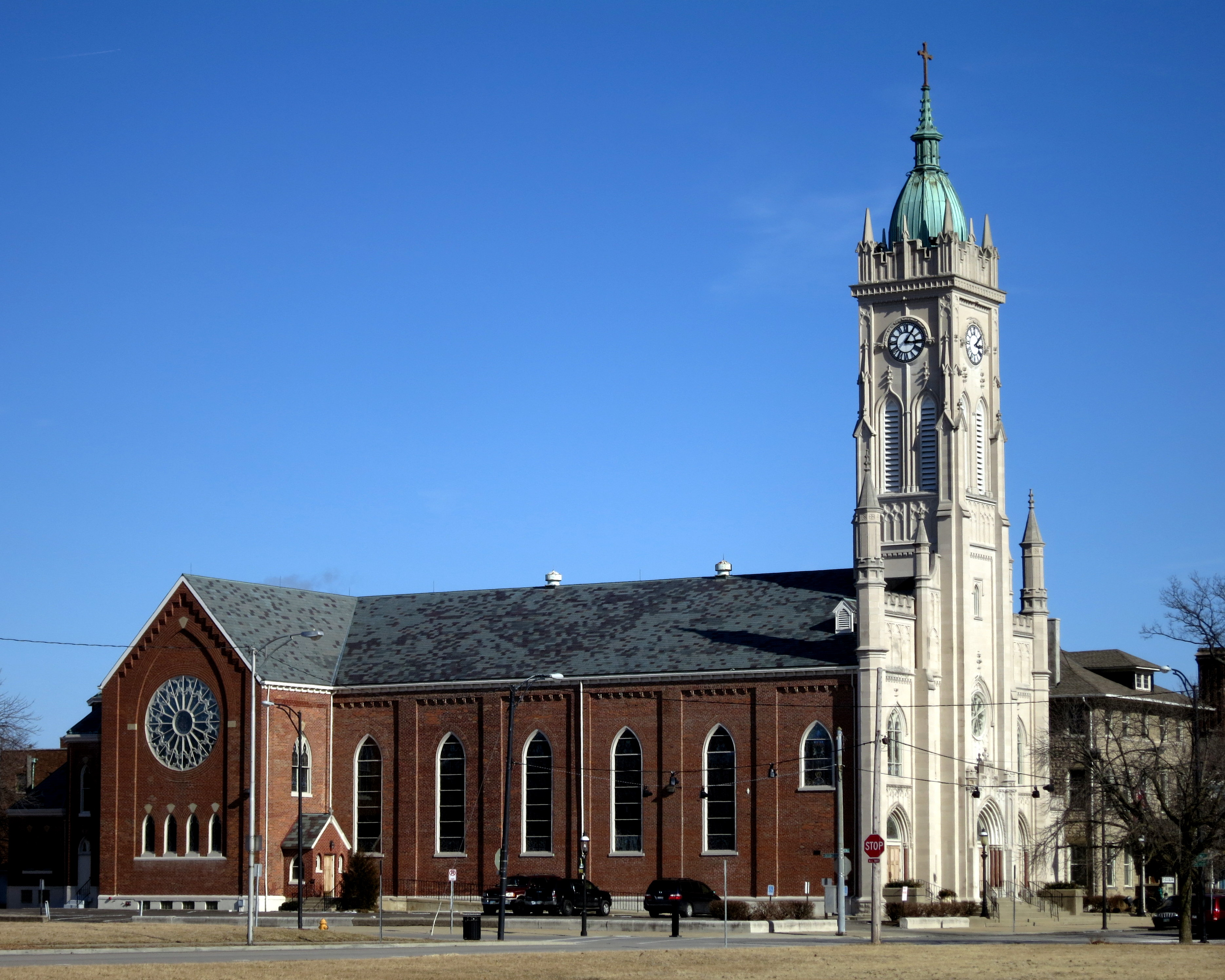
- St. Stephen Church in Hamilton, OH

- Location within Ohio Location within the United States
- Location: Hamilton, Ohio
- Coordinates: 39°24′5.78″N 84°33′37.49″W
- Architectural style: Gothic
- NRHP reference No.: 82003549
- Added to NRHP: July 29, 1982

St. Stephen Church and Rectory is a registered historic building in Hamilton, Ohio, listed in the National Register on July 29th, 1982. Located in Hamilton's German Village Historic District, the church building is home to Saint Julie Billiart Catholic Parish, an active parish in the Roman Catholic Archdiocese of Cincinnati.

== History ==
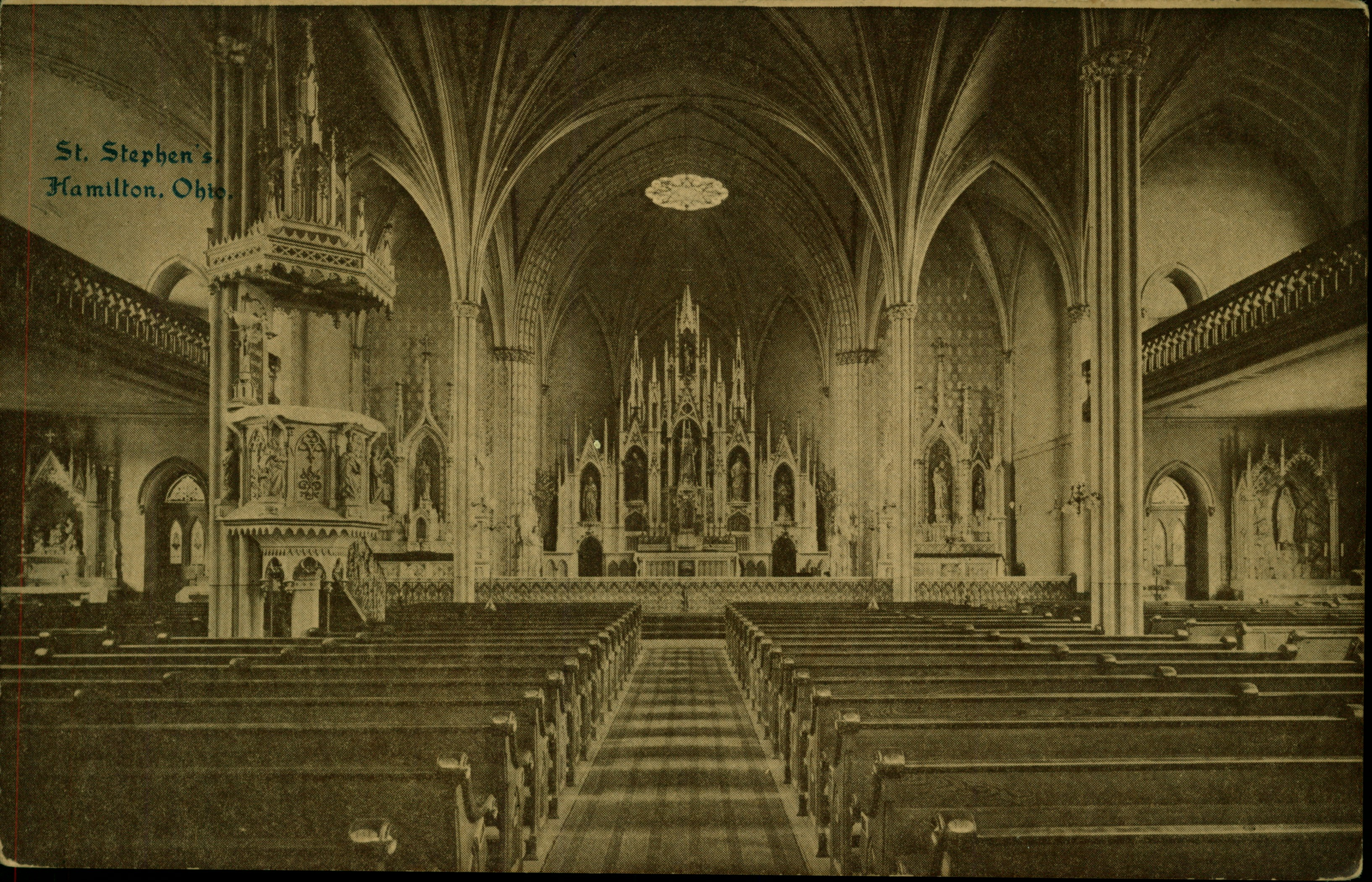
The church interior as it appeared in the early 20th century.

German settlers founded Saint Stephen Parish in 1830, making it the oldest Catholic parish in Butler County. The original Gothic church building was begun in 1832, but the continued influx of German immigrants over the following decades required more space. The new structure was completed in 1854 under the leadership of Rev. Piman Eberhard, OFM. The church rectory was constructed in 1870. The church sanctuary was expanded and the transepts were added in 1893, giving the church its current cruciform footprint. The Tudor Gothic façade and tower were constructed by Andrew Benzing of Hamilton in 1912. That same year, the church installed Munich-style stained glass windows from Zettler Studios of Munich, Germany. In 1989, the Saint Stephen Church building became the home for Saint Julie Billiart Catholic Parish. The new parish combined the congregations of two other local churches (Saint Mary and Saint Veronica churches) with the Saint Stephen congregation.
