= List of anti-discrimination laws in the United States =

The following is a list of anti-discrimination laws and judicial decisions which have come into force in various areas of the United States since independence in 1776.

== Federal ==
- Age Discrimination Act of 1975
- Age Discrimination in Employment Act of 1967
- Americans with Disabilities Act of 1990
- Architectural Barriers Act of 1968
- Bostock v. Clayton County –— a landmark United States Supreme Court case in 2020 in which the Court held that Title VII of the Civil Rights Act of 1964 protects employees against discrimination because of their sexual orientation or gender identity
- Civil Rights Act of 1866
- Civil Rights Act of 1871
- Civil Rights Act of 1957
- Civil Rights Act of 1964
- Civil Rights Act of 1968
- Civil Rights Act of 1991
- Equal Pay Act of 1963
- Executive Order 11478
- Executive Order 13166 – “Improving Access to Services for Persons with Limited English Proficiency”
- Fair Employment Act of 1941
- Family & Medical Leave Act of 1993 - enables qualified employees to take prolonged unpaid leave for family and health-related reasons without fear of losing their jobs. For private employers with 15 or more employers
- Fourteenth Amendment to the United States Constitution
- Fifteenth Amendment to the United States Constitution
- Nineteenth Amendment to the United States Constitution
- Twenty-fourth Amendment to the United States Constitution
- Genetic Information Nondiscrimination Act
- Lloyd–La Follette Act (1912)
- Lilly Ledbetter Fair Pay Act of 2009
- No-FEAR Act
- Voting Rights Act of 1965
- Pregnancy Discrimination Act of 1978
- Rehabilitation Act of 1973
- Civil Rights Restoration Act of 1987
- Respect for Marriage Act (2022)

== State ==
- Alaska
  - Alaska Constitution, Article I, §3 (1972, protecting equality on the basis of "race, color, creed, sex or national origin")
  - Anti-Discrimination Act of 1945
  - CROWN Act (2022; only for public education)
- Arkansas
  - CROWN Act (2023, only for public education)
- California:
  - California Constitution, Article I, §8 (1879)
  - California Fair Employment and Housing Act
  - Unruh Civil Rights Act
  - California Voting Rights Act
  - CROWN Act (2019)
- Colorado
  - Colorado Constitution, Article II, §29 (1973)
  - CROWN Act (2020)
- Connecticut
  - Connecticut Constitution, Article I, §20 (1974)
  - CROWN Act (2021)
  - Homeless Bill of Rights
  - John R. Lewis Voting Rights Act of Connecticut (2023)
- Delaware
  - Delaware Constitution, Article I, §21 (2019, 2021)
  - CROWN Act (2021)
- Florida
  - Florida Constitution, Article I, §2 (1998)
- Georgia
  - Fair Employment Practices Act
- Hawaii
  - Hawaii Constitution, Article I, §3 (1978)
- Illinois
  - Illinois Constitution, Article I, §18 (1970)
  - Jett Hawkins Act (2021)
  - Homeless Bill of Rights
- Iowa
  - Iowa Constitution, Article I, §1 (1998)
- Louisiana
  - Louisiana Constitution, Article I, §3 (1975)
  - CROWN Act (2023)
- Maine
  - 2012 Maine Question 1
  - CROWN Act (2022)
- Maryland
  - Maryland Constitution, Declaration of Rights, Article 46 (1972)
  - Civil Marriage Protection Act (2012)
  - CROWN Act (2020)
- Massachusetts
  - Massachusetts Constitution, Part 1, Article 1 (1976)
  - Massachusetts Gender Identity Anti-Discrimination Initiative
  - CROWN Act (2022)
- Michigan
  - Elliott-Larsen Civil Rights Act
    - CROWN Act (2023)
- Minnesota
  - CROWN Act (2023)
- Montana
  - Montana Constitution, Article II, §4 (1973)
- Nebraska
  - Nebraska Constitution, Article I, §30 (2008)
  - CROWN Act (2021)
- Nevada
  - Nevada Constitution, Article 1, Section 24 (2022)
  - CROWN Act (2021)
- New Hampshire
  - New Hampshire Constitution, Part First, Article 2 (1974)
- New Jersey
  - New Jersey Constitution, Article X, paragraph 4 (1947)
  - New Jersey Anti-Bullying Bill of Rights Act (2011)
  - CROWN Act (2019)
- New Mexico
  - New Mexico Constitution, Article II, §18 (1973)
  - CROWN Act (2021)
- New York
  - Malby Law (1895)
  - Ives-Quinn Act
  - Marriage Equality Act (2011)
  - Dignity for All Students Act (2010)
  - New York Human Rights Law (1945)
    - Gender Expression Non-Discrimination Act (2019)
    - Sexual Orientation Non-Discrimination Act (2002)
  - CROWN Act (2019)
  - 2024 New York Proposal 1
- Oregon
  - Oregon Constitution, Article I, §46 (2014)
  - CROWN Act (2021)
- Pennsylvania
  - Pennsylvania Constitution, Article I, § 28 (1971), Pennsylvania Constitution, Article I, § 29 (2021)
- Rhode Island
  - Rhode Island Constitution, Article I, §2 (1986)
  - Homeless Bill of Rights
- Tennessee
  - CROWN Act (2022; only applies to workplace discrimination)
- Texas
  - Texas Constitution, Article I, §3a (1972)
  - CROWN Act (2023)
- Utah
  - Utah Constitution, Article IV, §1 (1896)
  - Utah SB 296 (2015)
- Vermont
  - Marriage Equality Act (2009)
- Virginia
  - Virginia Constitution, Article I, §11 (1971)
  - CROWN Act (2020)
  - Voting Rights Act of Virginia (2021)
  - Virginia Values Act (2020)
- Washington
  - Washington Constitution, ARTICLE XXXI, §1 (1972)
  - 2012 Washington Referendum 74
  - Washington State Law Against Discrimination
    - Washington House Bill 2661
    - CROWN Act (2020)
- Wisconsin
  - AB 70 (1982)
- Wyoming
  - Wyoming Constitution, Articles I and VI (1890)

== See also ==
- List of cities and counties in the United States offering an LGBT non-discrimination ordinance
- Homeless Bill of Rights
- State equal rights amendments
- Employment discrimination law in the United States
- Discrimination based on hair texture in the United States
- Public accommodations in the United States
