= Lane–Hooven House =

Historic house in Ohio, United States

- U.S. National Register of Historic Places
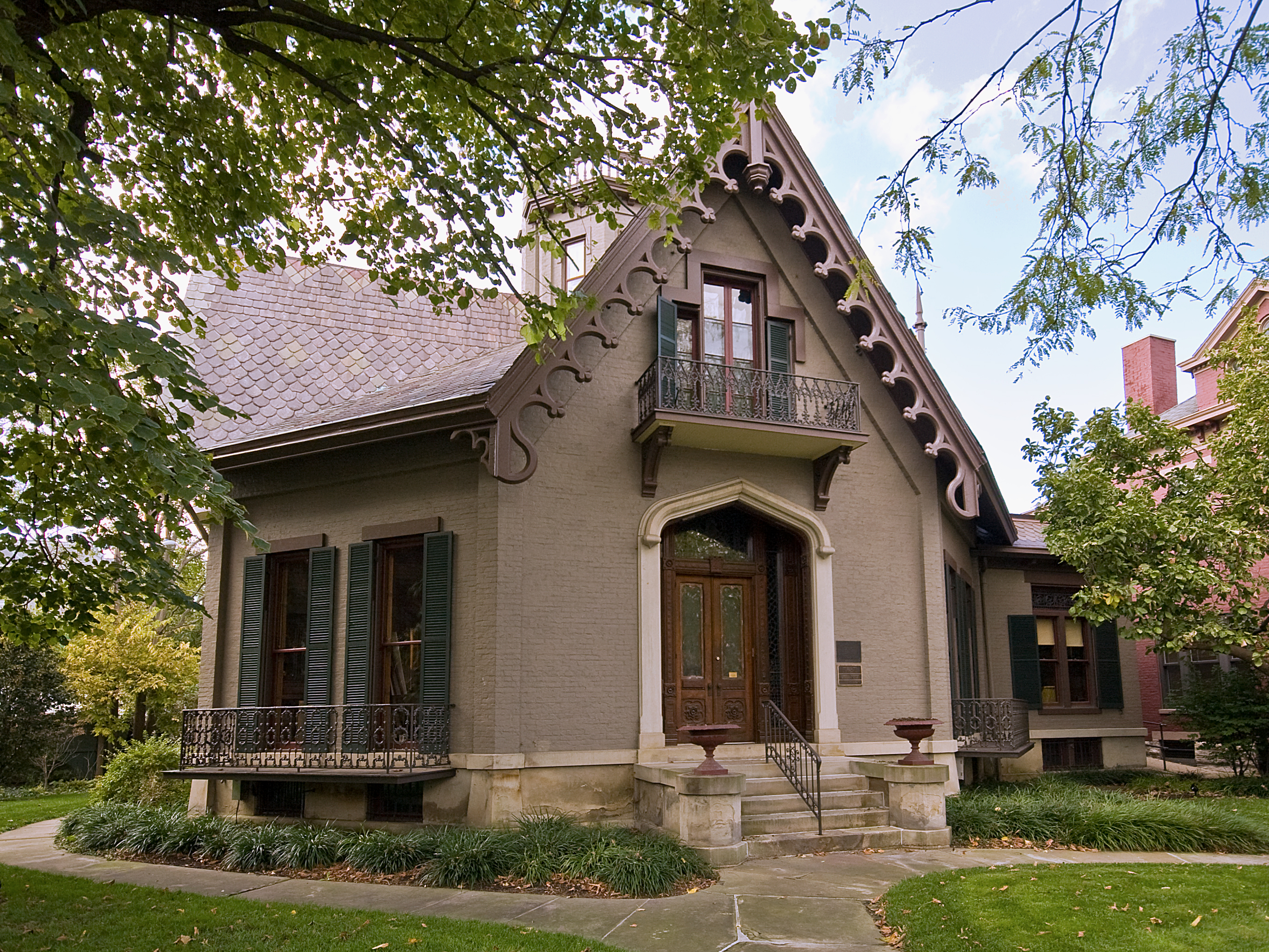

- Location within Ohio Location within the United States
- Location: 319 N. 3rd St., Hamilton, Ohio
- Coordinates: 39°24′13″N 84°33′34″W
- Area: less than one acre
- Built: 1863
- Architectural style: Gothic Revival
- NRHP reference No.: 73001389
- Added to NRHP: October 25, 1973

The Lane–Hooven House is a historic house museum in Hamilton, Ohio. Built in 1863 for Clark Lane, a Hamilton industrialist and philanthropist, the octagonal house features a brick exterior with Gothic Tudor elements. Other features include an open spiral staircase extending from the basement to the third floor turret, cast-iron fence, a greenhouse and a fountain. It was listed in the National Register on October 25, 1973.

== General Information ==
The Lane–Hooven house, built in 1863 by James Elrick a Hamilton, Ohio builder, is one of only 400 octagonal structures in the United States. In 1866, Owner Clark Lane had a library built across the street from his home in the same octagonal design. The Lane–Hooven house and its sister building, the Lane Public Library, are located in the German Village Historic District.

The Lane–Hooven House was purchased in 1875 by John L. Martin, then president of the Second National Bank of Hamilton.

In 1882, the house was sold to Colonel Alexander Gordon, who was born in England in 1840. Colonel Gordon was secretary and later president of Niles Tool Works of Hamilton. The house was then occupied, and later inherited by Mr. Gordon's niece, Mrs. C. Earle Hooven and her husband from 1895 until 1942.

Bertrand Kahn bought the home in 1942 and gifted it to the city as a memorial to his father, Lazard Kahn, founder for one of the town's largest companies, for community use. Mr. Kahn stipulated that for the duration of World War II, the Red Cross was to have use of the building; The Red Cross continued as its tenant until June 1, 1978.

The Hamilton Community Foundation has owned the house since 1951 and maintains its offices there. The Foundation provides free tours of the home during the week by appointment.
