= Executive Order 14187 =

2025 executive order signed by Trump

- Protecting Children from Chemical and Surgical Mutilation
- Type: Executive order
- Number: 14187
- President: Donald Trump
- Signed: January 28, 2025

Federal Register details
- Federal Register document number: 2025-02194
- Publication date: January 28, 2025

Executive Order 14187, titled "Protecting Children from Chemical and Surgical Mutilation", is an executive order issued by Donald Trump on January 28, 2025. Part of a broader targeting of transgender people, the order acts to prevent gender-affirming care for Americans under 19 years old by withholding federal funding and directing agencies to take a variety of steps to prevent surgeries, hormone therapy, the use of puberty blockers, and other gender-affirming treatments.

In response, some hospitals paused providing gender-affirming care for minors, while others continued. Attorneys general from 15 states said their states are committed to continuing to provide gender-affirming care to minors. Multiple groups filed lawsuits challenging the legality of the executive order. In response to one of the lawsuits, several federal judges issued injunctions blocking the government from withholding federal funds from hospitals that provide gender-affirming care to minors. Following the injunctions, some hospitals that initially paused gender-affirming care for minors resumed the care.

== Background ==
On January 20, 2025, Donald Trump signed executive order Executive Order 14168 ("Defending Women from Gender Ideology Extremism and Restoring Biological Truth to the Federal Government"), which described transgender identity as an ideology. On January 27, 2025, Donald Trump signed executive order Executive Order 14183 ("Prioritizing Military Excellence and Readiness") which stated that the policy of United States military readiness is "inconsistent with the medical, surgical, and mental health constraints on individuals with gender dysphoria" and that beyond that, being trans "conflicts with a soldier’s commitment to an honorable, truthful, and disciplined lifestyle, even in one’s personal life." This order is seen as consistent with these prior orders.

== Summary ==
The order described gender-affirming care for minors as "chemical and surgical mutilation of children" as well as "maiming" and "sterilizing". It stated "countless children" who received such care would regret a "horrifying tragedy that they will never be able to conceive children of their own or nurture their children through breastfeeding." The order also described the World Professional Association for Transgender Health's (WPATH) guidance as "junk science".

The order states that the U.S. Federal Government will not "fund, sponsor, promote, assist, or support the so-called 'transition' of a child from one sex to another." Its provisions include:

- Directing the United States Department of Health and Human Services to review the terms of insurance under Medicare, Medicaid, and the Affordable Care Act to end certain types of gender-affirming care
- Ordering federal agencies providing federal grants to medical institutions to make sure those institutions are not carrying out any gender-related procedures
- Protecting whistleblowers who report on institutions that provide gender-affirming care in violation of the executive order

== Implementation ==
In February 2025, the Office of Personnel Management announced that insurance carriers that provide health insurance coverage to Federal employees under the Federal Employees Health Benefits Program will no longer be allowed to provide coverage for gender-affirming care for minors. Carriers must identify any resulting premium reductions and incorporate those reductions into their 2026 rates. Carriers may continue to offer coverage for gender-affirming care for persons 19 years old and older, but they are not required to do so.

In May 2025, the United States Department of Health and Human Services published a report titled Treatment for Pediatric Gender Dysphoria: Review of Evidence and Best Practices. The report promotes gender exploratory therapy, a form of conversion therapy intended to delay or prevent someone suffering gender dysphoria from seeking gender transition.

In the summer of that year, the Department of Justice began sending subpoenas to "over 20" hospitals demanding the full records of trans patients who received medical care under 19 - including their names, social security numbers, doctors' notes, and treatments prescribed. This practice continued into 2026, expanding to many more hospitals across the nation.

In 2026, the Trump admin began forcing hospitals which it had found to have acted in violation of the order - beginning with Texas Children's Hospital and The Cleveland Clinic - to establish detransition clinics, which would perform medical detransitions on any patient who had previously received transgender healthcare.

== Analysis ==
According to The New York Times, this executive order, in combination with other gender related executive orders, results in "essentially placing the federal government in opposition to a wide variety of gender-related therapies and to anyone who seeks them." The New York Times has also said that the financial implications of the order are "enormous" since a large fraction of many health care institutions' research budgets come from the federal government, and patient care income comes from Medicare and Medicaid. Contributor Masha Gessen argued that this order, along with the wide array of restrictions implemented as part of Executive Order 14168 and Executive Order 14183, constituted an effort by the Trump administration to "denationalize" transgender people, much in the way that Jews were in 1930s Germany.

In an interview with The Conversation, Elana Redfield, federal policy director at the Williams Institute on Sexual Orientation and Gender Identity Law and Public Policy, stated:

- "...a big part of the executive order is directing the federal agencies that administer these programs to review their own policies to ensure that they are not supporting gender-affirming care for minors"
- "Ultimately, the president can only take actions in ways that are designated by the Constitution, or through some specific power that Congress has granted to the executive branch. I don’t see that authority granted for a lot of what’s contained in this executive order."
- "...there’s a pending U.S. Supreme Court decision regarding a Tennessee law banning gender-affirming care for minors. Should the Supreme Court determine that Tennessee is able to ban gender-affirming care for minors, it’s possible to see how this could impact private health insurance coverage for gender-affirming care."
- "...it’s important to remember that executive orders aren’t established policy. They’re simply directing agencies to craft certain policies and encouraging lawmakers to enact legislation."

NBC News described the language in the executive order as inflammatory and noted that major medical associations support access to transgender health care for minors. It also referenced a study published in JAMA Pediatrics that found "less than 0.1% of adolescents with private insurance in the U.S. are transgender or gender-diverse and are prescribed puberty blockers or gender-affirming hormones."

The executive order is similar to a portion of Project 2025 that called for withdrawing "guidance issued under the Biden Administration concerning sexual orientation and gender identity under Section 1557" of the Affordable Care Act.

After some hospitals began pausing or ending gender-affirming care for minors in response to the executive order, psychiatrist and professor Dr. Robert Klitzman said he believed that providers, local governments or nonprofit organizations would look into setting up private clinics to continue offering gender-affirming care for minors. Such clinics would be entirely separate from other hospitals and the federal government.

== Reactions ==
=== Hospitals ===
The following hospitals or health care providers have paused or ended gender-affirming care for minors in response to the executive order:

- Children's National Hospital in Washington DC paused prescriptions of puberty blockers and gender-affirming hormone therapy for minors in order to "assess the situation further" as of January 30, 2025. The hospital already did not perform gender-affirming surgeries on minors. In 2022, the hospital was subject to a harassment campaign for allegedly providing gender-affirming surgeries to minors.
- NYU Langone Health has reportedly cancelled appointments for providing puberty blockers for some children as of February 3, 2025. They have not, however, made any announcement.
- VCU Medical Center and Children's Hospital of Richmond at VCU, both in Virginia, suspended gender-affirming medication and gender-affirming surgeries for those under 19 as of January 30, 2025. On February 25, 2025, both announced that they would resume gender-affirming care for their existing patients, but would be keeping the pause on new patients. On July 29, 2025, VCU Health announced that they would once again be suspending care for existing patients under 19.
- Memorial Health in Georgia reportedly began cancelling gender-affirming surgery appointments for transgender adults in their mid-20s, despite the executive order only applying to those under 19. A state law in Georgia already bans gender-affirming surgery for people under 18.
- El Rio Community Health Center in Arizona said in February 2025 that gender-affirming care for both minors and adults had been "put on hold" for the time being.
- Lurie Children's Hospital and Northwestern Memorial Hospital, both in Illinois, "paused" gender-affirming care for people under 19 following the executive order.
- UCHealth in Colorado paused all gender-affirming care for people under 19. After the executive order was temporarily blocked in court, UCHealth said that they would not be resuming care and were waiting for a permanent court decision.
- Boston Children's Hospital in Massachusetts reportedly began canceling gender-affirming care appointments scheduled for minors.
- Seattle Children's hospital in Washington State reportedly began to postpone some gender-affirming surgeries for patients under 19.
- New York-Presbyterian Hospital and Mount Sinai Health, both in New York, canceled some appointments for gender-affirming care.
- Phoenix Children's Hospital in Arizona announced that they would be "indefinitely" stopping its gender-affirming care program for patients under 19 years old to comply with the executive order.
- Penn State Health, University of Pittsburgh Medical Center and UPMC Children's Hospital of Pittsburgh, all in Pennsylvania, said in April 2025, that they would be stopping gender-affirming care for patients under the age of 19 to comply with the executive order.
- Medical University of South Carolina (MUSC) reportedly canceled a gender-affirming surgery appointment for a transgender adult in their early 30s, despite the executive order only applying to those under 19. A state law in South Carolina already bans gender-affirming surgery for people under 18.
- Cherokee Health Systems (CHS) in Tennessee is no longer accepting new patients for gender-affirming hormone therapy even for adults in response to this executive order and the related executive order. Nonetheless, they are still providing treatment for existing patients that are 19 years old and older in response to a recent court order. CHS was already in compliance with a Tennessee law banning gender-affirming hormone therapy for people under 18 prior to the executive order.
- Children's Healthcare of Atlanta announced in April 2025 that they had stopped offering gender-affirming care for minors. However, this was largely due to a new state law prohibiting doctors from treating children with gender dysphoria, in addition to Trump's executive order.
- In May 2025, Penn Medicine in Pennsylvania announced that they had stopped all gender-affirming surgeries for people under 19. However, they are continuing to provide puberty blockers and hormones for people under 19.
- In May 2025, Central Outreach Wellness Center in Pennsylvania announced that they would stop providing gender-affirming care to minors due to the executive order.
- Children's Hospital Los Angeles (CHLA) in California paused gender-affirming care for trans youth while they review the executive order and court orders challenging it. In response Attorney General, Rob Bonta, warned hospitals in California that refusing to give gender-affirming care from transgender youth may violate state discrimination laws which protect access to the care in the state. On February 21, 2024, CHLA announced that they will resume gender-affirming care for trans youth due to Bonta's warning. However, on June 12, 2025, CHLA announced that they would be closing their entire gender clinic on July 22 which, in addition to minors, treats patients up to the age up 25. CHLA said they had been left with "no viable alternative" and cited the increasing pressure from the Trump administration and the fact that the hospital "relies on federal funding more than any other pediatric hospital in the state" and without the funds, the entire hospital would only last 50 days.
- In June 2025, the Community Medical Center (CMC) in Montana announced that it would stop providing gender-affirming care to patients under the age of 18. In addition to pressure from the federal government, CMC also cited two new state laws recently passed by the Montana legislature which makes gender-affirming care harder for minors to get. In 2023, the Montana legislature enacted an outright ban on gender-affirming care for minors. However, the law has since been ruled "unconstitutional" and the care remains legal in the state. However, the state is actively appealing the ruling.
- In June 2025, Primary Health Care in Iowa announced that it would end all gender-affirming care for adult patients due to the executive order, even though the executive order only applies to those under 19. A state law in Iowa already bans gender-affirming surgery for people under 18.
- In June 2025, Stanford Medicine in California announced that they would be "pausing" gender-affirming surgeries for people under the age of 19. However, they are continuing to provide puberty blockers and hormones for minors and adults.
- In July 2025, Nemours Children's Hospital in Delaware announced that they would no longer provide gender-affirming care to new patients due to pressure from the Trump administration.
- Starting July 1, 2025, Rush University Medical Center in Illinois announced that they would be "pausing" gender-affirming hormones for new patients under 18.
- UChicago Medicine announced that they would be discontinuing all gender-affirming care for minors in response to "federal actions".
- UI Health in Illinois suspended gender-affirming surgeries for patients younger than 19 "after careful review of recent federal government actions".
- Brown University in Rhode Island made an agreement with Trump to restore $50 million in research grants in exchange for the university stopping gender-affirming care for minors among other things.
- Yale Medicine and Yale New Haven Hospital announced that they would no long offer gender-affirming care to people under 19 "after monitoring ongoing federal and administrative changes and making a thorough assessment of the current environment."
- Connecticut Children's Medical Center announced that they would be "winding down" gender-affirming care for people under 19 following "pressure from the Trump administration".
- Kaiser Permanente announced that they would be "pausing" gender-affirming surgeries for trans patients under 19 after receiving threats from the Trump administration, but will continue to offer puberty blockers and cross-sex hormones.
- University of Michigan Medicine said in August 2025 that they would stop providing gender affirming care to patients under 19, including puberty blockers and hormones, after being subpoenaed by the Trump administration as part of a "criminal and civil investigation" into their provision of such care.
- In October 2025, Fenway Health in Boston said that they would cease providing gender affirming care under the age of 19 in order to protect their ability to provide care more broadly.
- In December 2025, Sutter Health in Sacramento ended the provision of gender affirming care under 19, including to current patients.

The following hospitals and healthcare providers have stated they will continue to provide gender-affirming care to minors notwithstanding the executive order:

- Transhealth in Massachusetts said on its website that it will continue providing care.
- Howard Brown Health in Illinois issued statements stating they will monitor the executive order, but will otherwise continue to provide gender-affirming care as needed by their patients.
- M Health Fairview, Allina Health, Children's Minnesota and North Memorial Health, all in Minnesota, said that they will continue providing gender-affirming care for minors and adults.
- On February 11, 2025, Legacy Health in Oregon said that they had not had not made any changes in the way they provide gender-affirming care.
- Whitman-Walker Health in D.C. said that they will continue providing gender-affirming care to minors and adults.
- Children's Hospital Colorado and Denver Health in Colorado both announced that they had stopped providing gender-affirming care in late January 2025. On February 20, 2025, it was announced that both hospitals would resume providing puberty blockers and hormones after the Colorado Attorney General, Phil Weiser joined the legal challenge filed in Washington state to block the order. However, Denver Health continued its pause on surgeries for patients under 19 for the time being. In January 2026, both hospitals again suspended gender-affirming care, in response to new federal investigations. On May 18, the Colorado Supreme Court ruled that Children's Hospital's suspension of care violated the state's antidiscrimination law.
- Cedars-Sinai Medical Center in California said that they will continue to offer gender-affirming care for trans youth.
- Children's Wisconsin Hospital canceled a transgender teenager's appointment to receive hormone therapy. The next day, the hospital reversed this decision and rescheduled the appointment.
- Corewell Health in Michigan initially said that they would "pause" gender-affirming hormone therapy for new patients under 19, but a few days later said that they had lifted the pause following backlash.
- Amoskeag Health in New Hampshire said that they would "pause" gender-affirming care for minors, but within 48 hours, they notified patients that they had reversed the decision and would resume the service.
- Prisma Community Care in Phoenix, Arizona said during the week of February 3 that they had "paused" gender-affirming hormones for minors. However, after the executive order was blocked in court, they swiftly lifted the pause saying "the court ruling was the green light to fully restore care."
- University of Virginia (UVA) Health initially "paused" gender-affirming care for minors, but subsequently lifted the pause after the executive order was blocked in court. On February 21, 2025, The University of Virginia's governing board passed a resolution which said UVA Health could continue providing gender-affirming care to minors already receiving it, but should refer new patients to private providers "until further notice."
- Children's Hospital of The King's Daughters in Virginia initially "paused" gender-affirming care for minors, but subsequently lifted the pause after the executive order was blocked in court.
- Tucson Medical Center in Arizona still offers gender-affirming care as they do not receive any recent federal funds that could be subject to the executive order.
- Planned Parenthood of Arizona briefly paused their gender-affirming care services, but swiftly resumed it a few days later.
- Callen-Lorde Community Health Center in New York said that they "will not back down from [their] obligation to provide for [their] patients" including gender-affirming care for minors.
- NYC Health + Hospitals said that they are continuing to provide gender-affirming care in the aftermath of the executive order.
- Mass General Brigham in Massachusetts and a few other unnamed clinics in the Boston area said that they will continue to provide gender-affirming care and "do not anticipate any changes".
- On February 6, 2025, St. John's Community Health in California stated they had been unable to withdraw $1.67 million CDC grant specifically for their transgender health services, despite the injunction on the executive order forbidding federal departments from initiating any funding freezes or terminations based on [the president's] executive orders. Despite this, St. John's Community Health said they would continue to provide gender-affirming care and would "find the money elsewhere".
- Allegheny Health Network in Pennsylvania is continuing to offer gender-affirming care for minors and adults.

=== For ===
According to The New York Times, "On social media, conservative activists struck a celebratory tone." Supporters of the executive order in Congress included Florida senator Rick Scott, Louisiana senator Bill Cassidy, Missouri senator Josh Hawley, and Missouri representative Bob Onder. Hawley, Scott, and others introduced legislation to try to codify the executive order in law.

=== Against ===
Human Rights Campaign President Kelley Robinson said, "It is deeply unfair to play politics with people's lives and strip transgender young people, their families and their providers of the freedom to make necessary health care decisions."

American Civil Liberties Union (ACLU) attorney Harper Seldin called the order "[clearly not meant to] protect anyone in this country, but rather to single-mindedly drive out transgender people of all ages from all walks of civic life".

After some hospitals announced that they had paused gender-affirming care for patients under 19 in order continue to receive federal funding, protests were held at the hospitals demanding that they reverse the pauses, including at Seattle Children's Hospital, Children's Hospital Colorado and Children's Hospital Los Angeles (CHLA). Some of these hospitals subsequently lifted their pauses on the care.

=== States ===
In February 2025, attorneys general from 15 states issued a joint statement that their states are committed to continuing to provide gender-affirming care to minors despite the executive order. The statement cites a federal court's ruling that the Trump administration cannot halt funding approved by Congress. The states that signed the joint statement were California, Colorado, Connecticut, Delaware, Hawaii, Illinois, Maine, Maryland, Massachusetts, Nevada, New Jersey, New York, Rhode Island, Vermont and Wisconsin.

New York attorney general Letitia James sent a letter to New York hospitals and other health care providers on February 2, 2025, warning them that denying health care to pediatric transgender patients may violate New York's anti-discrimination laws. In April 2025, with several hospitals in New York City still not having resumed care, the New York City Council approved several bills to expanding protections for gender-affirming care and providers.

After Children's Hospital Los Angeles said that that it had paused some gender-affirming care for minors, California attorney general Rob Bonta publicly warned the hospital that state law requires providing equal access to healthcare. On February 19, 2025, the California LGBTQ Health and Human Services Network, said that they were unaware of any healthcare providers in California other than CHLA that are continuing to restrict gender-affirming care for trans youth after Bonta issued his warning. On February 21, 2024, CHLA announced that they will resume gender-affirming care for trans youth due to Bonta's warning. However, on June 12, 2025, CHLA announced that they would be closing their entire gender clinic on July 22 which, in addition to minors, treats patients up to the age up 25. CHLA said they had been left with "no viable alternative" and cited the increasing pressure from the Trump administration and the fact that the hospital "relies on federal funding more than any other pediatric hospital in the state" and without the funds, the entire hospital would only last 50 days.

=== Legal actions ===
On February 4, 2025, several groups including the ACLU, Lambda Legal, PFLAG, and GLMA filed a lawsuit, PFLAG v. Trump, in the federal District Court in Maryland against the Trump administration over the executive order. The lawsuit was filed on behalf of two young transgender adults, five transgender adolescents, and their families, whose health care has been disrupted by the executive order. The filing of the lawsuit was followed by a request for an immediate restraining order against the enforcement of the executive order. On February 13, Judge Brendan Hurson issued a temporary restraining order that prevents withholding federal funds from hospitals that provide gender-affirming care to minors. On March 4, Hurson extended a nationwide block on enforcement of the executive order.

On February 7, 2025, the states of Washington, Minnesota, and Oregon, along with three doctors, filed a lawsuit in the federal District Court for the Western District of Washington requesting a court order to block enforcement of the executive order. The filing argues that the order is in violation of transgender people's rights to equal protection under the Fifth Amendment, and in violation of the Tenth Amendment by trying to unilaterally criminalize medical practices. All three states require Medicaid and private health plans to cover transgender health care. The lawsuit also argues that the president cannot discontinue research funding already authorized by Congress for hospitals and medical schools in Oregon, Washington and Minnesota. On February 19, 2025, Colorado Attorney General, Phil Weiser, announced that the state of Colorado had also joined the lawsuit. On March 1, 2025, Judge Lauren King blocked the executive order, but only in the four states that filed the lawsuit.

On August 1, 2025, following an increasing number of hospitals in blue states either stopping or pausing gender-affirming care for minors in blue states out of fear of the Trump administration's actions, the states of California, Connecticut, Delaware, Hawaii, Illinois, Maine, Maryland, Massachusetts, Michigan, Nevada, New Jersey, New York, New Mexico, Rhode Island, Wisconsin and Pennsylvania, as well as Washington, D.C. filed a lawsuit to block the administration's investigations into providers who provide gender-affirming care to minors. The lawsuit argues that by threatening to investigate and prosecute providers, the administration is attempting to enact a national ban on gender-affirming care for minors, which is unlawful without Congress enacting a federal ban. Additionally, the states argue that gender-affirming care is legally protected in their states and that the administration's attempt to illegally intimidate providers and indirectly ban the care violates the Tenth Amendment to the United States Constitution.

On May 7, 2026, the Department of Justice issued a grand jury subpoena to NYU Langone for information about minors receiving gender-affirming care. The hospital stated that several other institutions received subpoenas on the same date. On May 9, eleven families with transgender children filed a lawsuit, In re: Administrative Subpoenas to Children’s Hospitals, in the U.S. District Court of Maryland. The plaintiffs seek to block the Department of Justice from obtaining the medical records of trans minors from hospitals. On May 13, U.S. district court judge Mary S. McElroy refused access to patient information sought in a subpoena to Rhode Island Hospital, accusing the DOJ of misleading and "appalling" behavior.

== See also ==
- List of executive orders in the second presidency of Donald Trump
- Executive Order 14168
- 2020s anti-LGBTQ movement in the United States
- Trump administration HHS gender dysphoria report
- Transgender rights in the United States § Treatment for minors
- Healthcare and the LGBTQ community § Denial of health care in the United States
