= Evaluation of Transsexual Surgery =

The Evaluation of Transsexual Surgery was a report published by the National Center for Health Care Technology (NCHCT) under the United States Department of Health and Human Services in 1981. The report drew on a paper from Janice Raymond on the "social and ethical aspects of transsexual surgery" which the NCHCT had commissioned from her in 1980. The report concluded, based on Raymond's work, that transgender surgeries were "experimental" and "controversial" and recommended they not be covered by public insurance. This was formalized in a National Coverage Determination (NCD) banning it for Medicaid in 1989, which remained in force until 2014. The report and exclusion of trans healthcare that resulted from it are thought to have shortened the lifespans of transgender people in the United States.

== Background ==
The National Center for Health Care Technology was created under the Department of Health and Human Services (HHS) by Congress's passage of Public Law 95-623 in 1978 with a 3 year mandate.

In 1979, Janice Raymond published The Transsexual Empire, which argued that "all transsexuals rape women's bodies by reducing the real female form to an artifact, appropriating the body for themselves".

Prior to 1981, the US Department of Health and Human Services considered transition related healthcare to be medically necessary. Several court cases prior to 1981 deemed state efforts to exclude transgender healthcare from Medicaid coverage to be unconstitutional discrimination.

== Report ==
In 1980, Raymond was contracted by the congressionally mandated NCHCT to research the ethics of transgender surgery, released in a report titled Technology on the Social and Ethical Aspects of Transsexual Surgery. Raymond's report said medical interventions are an ethical issues raising "questions of bodily mutilation" under the "do no harm" principle and called for "the elimination of transsexualism". It stated:

Over and above the medical and scientific issues, it would also appear that transsexual surgery is controversial in our society. For example. Thomas Szasz has asked whether an old person who desires to be young suffers from the "disease" of being a "transchronological" or does the poor person who wants to be rich suffer from the "disease" of being a "transeconomical?" (Szasz 1979). Some have held that it would be preferable to modify society's sex role expectations of men and women than to modify either the body or the mind of individuals to fit those sex expectations.

The National Center for Health Care Technology, operating under the United States Department of Health and Human Services, issued the Evaluation of Transsexual Surgery in 1981. The report stated the surgeries were "controversial" and "experimental" and that there is a "lack of well controlled, long-term studies of the safety and effectiveness of the surgical procedures" and "a high rate of serious complications". Raymond's report and a review of the Transsexual Empire were the only sources cited for the claim transgender surgeries were "controversial". It recommended that health care related to "sex changes" not be covered by public health insurance.

In 1989 the Health Care Financing Administration formalized this as a National Coverage Determination (NCD), 140.3, Transsexual Surgery that made transsexual surgery ineligible from public insurance on the basis of the NCTCH report. The ACLU submitted letters and affidavits challenging the NCD. The NCD stated:

Transsexual surgery for sex reassignment of transsexuals is controversial. Because of the lack of well controlled, long-term studies of the safety and effectiveness of the surgical procedures and attendant therapies for transsexualism, the treatment is considered experimental. Moreover, there is a high rate of serious complications for these surgical procedures. For these reasons, transsexual surgery is not covered.

== Legacy ==
Exclusion in public and private healthcare became the standard for decades and a lack of funding for clinical care and research led to the closing of transgender care programs. Many private insurers adopted trans exclusionary causes that denied based on the NCD. The report and legal exclusion of trans healthcare from public insurance is thought to have led to shortened life spans among transgender people.

Followed decisions in five states and Washington D.C. concluding that exclusions of transgender healthcare by private insurance plans were discriminatory, and statements from the American Medical Association and American Psychological Association, the NCD decision was reversed until 2014.

In 2013, the Obama administration and HHS announced plans to allow Medicare coverage of transgender surgery and requested public input. On the same day the request was made, the HHS withdrew it, stating the independent Department Appeals Board would review it instead. This was thought to be due to vocal opposition from conservative critics. The American Civil Liberties Union, Gay and Lesbian Advocates and Defenders (GLAD), and the National Center for Lesbian Rights (NCLR) filed the appeal on behalf of an aggrieved party, who had been denied coverage by Medicare for her surgery. Amicus Briefs were submitted by the World Professional Association for Transgender Health (WPATH), the Human Rights Campaign, the National Center for Transgender Equality, and the Sylvia Rivera Law Project. The Centers for Medicare and Medicaid Services (CMS) did not defend the challenged NCD and shifted the decision to the Local Coverage Determinations due to evidence presented that surgeries were safe, effective, and could no longer be considered experimental.
