= Carole Hooven =

American biologist

- Spouse: Alex Byrne
- Scientific career
- Thesis: Shifting the image of male superiority in spatial ability : an examination of sex differences in mental rotation (2004)
- Website: www.carolehooven.com

Carole K. Hooven is an evolutionary biologist. She is a nonresident fellow at the American Enterprise Institute. She is an associate in the lab of Steven Pinker.

Hooven received a Bachelor of Arts in psychology from Antioch College and a PhD in biological anthropology from Harvard University.

She is the former co-director of undergraduate studies in the Department of Human Evolutionary Biology of Harvard University.

In 2021, she published the book T: The Story of Testosterone, the Hormone that Dominates and Divides Us.

Also in 2021, Hooven participated in a television interview in which she stated that while gender identities should be respected, there are only two biological sexes that are "designated by the kinds of gametes we produce". This led to a backlash against her by faculty and members of the student body. In January 2023, she left her position feeling she had no support from the administration. In the spring of 2023, members of the Harvard faculty formed the Council on Academic Freedom at Harvard to promote "free inquiry, intellectual diversity and civil discourse". The group was formed to address concerns about academic freedom, with Hooven's case a catalyst for its formation. It has about 170 members as of February 2024.

In February 2024, the Foundation for Individual Rights and Expression gave Harvard University its "lifetime censorship award" for the censoring of campus free speech, including its treatment of Hooven.

Hooven is married to MIT philosopher Alex Byrne. In a 2024 op-ed in the New York Times the pair criticized the increasingly common phrase "sex assigned at birth", arguing "sex is a fundamental biological feature with significant consequences for our species, so there are costs to misconceptions about it".
