= Jo Ellis =

Jo Ellis may refer to:

- Jo Ellis (pilot) (born 1990 or 1991), member of the Virginia national guard
- Jo Ellis (field hockey) (born 1983), English field hockey player
- Joanne Ellis (born 1981), English field hockey player
