= 2025 Annunciation Catholic Church shooting =

Mass shooting in Minnesota, U.S.

- Police in front of the school
- Location: 44°54′17″N 93°17′8″W; Church of the Annunciation, Minneapolis, Minnesota, U.S.
- Date: August 27, 2025 c. 8:27 a.m. – c. 8:31 a.m. (CDT; UTC−05:00)
- Target: Worshippers at all-school Mass; Annunciation Catholic Church and School community
- Attack type: Mass shooting; murder-suicide; hate crime; school shooting; domestic terrorism; pedicide; double homicide
- Weapons: 5.56 AR-15-style semi-automatic rifle; 12-gauge Mossberg 590S Shockwave pump-action shotgun; 9mm Taurus GX2 semi-automatic pistol (unused, malfunctioned)
- Deaths: 3 (including the perpetrator)
- Injuries: 28 (27 via gunfire)
- Perpetrator: Robin Westman
- Motive: Under investigation

On the morning of August 27, 2025, a mass shooting occurred at the Church of the Annunciation in the Windom neighborhood of Minneapolis, Minnesota, United States. The attack took place during a scheduled school-wide Mass attended by the students and faculty of Annunciation Catholic School. Two children, Fletcher Merkel and Harper Moyski, and the perpetrator died in the shooting. Twenty-eight other people were injured: twenty-four schoolchildren and three elderly people from gunfire as well as a victim who sustained non-gunshot wounds. The perpetrator was identified as Robin M. Westman.

== Background ==
Annunciation Catholic Church and its affiliated parochial school have been in southwest Minneapolis for more than a century. The parish community held its first Mass in 1922. On September 10, 1923, four Dominican Sisters opened Annunciation School in a new red-brick church-school building. The school enrolls students from pre-kindergarten to eighth grade. It offers daily religion classes and emphasizes service projects for each grade level. Enrollment in 2024 was about 340 students. The students practiced active shooter drills in the school but not in the attached church.

The shooting occurred two months after another act of violence in Minnesota that drew national attention: the shootings of state representative Melissa Hortman and her husband, and state senator John Hoffman and his wife. The Hortmans were killed in the shooting and the Hoffmans were injured. On August 26, the day before the Annunciation attack, another mass shooting occurred outside Cristo Rey Jesuit High School in Minneapolis, injuring six and killing one.

== Shooting ==
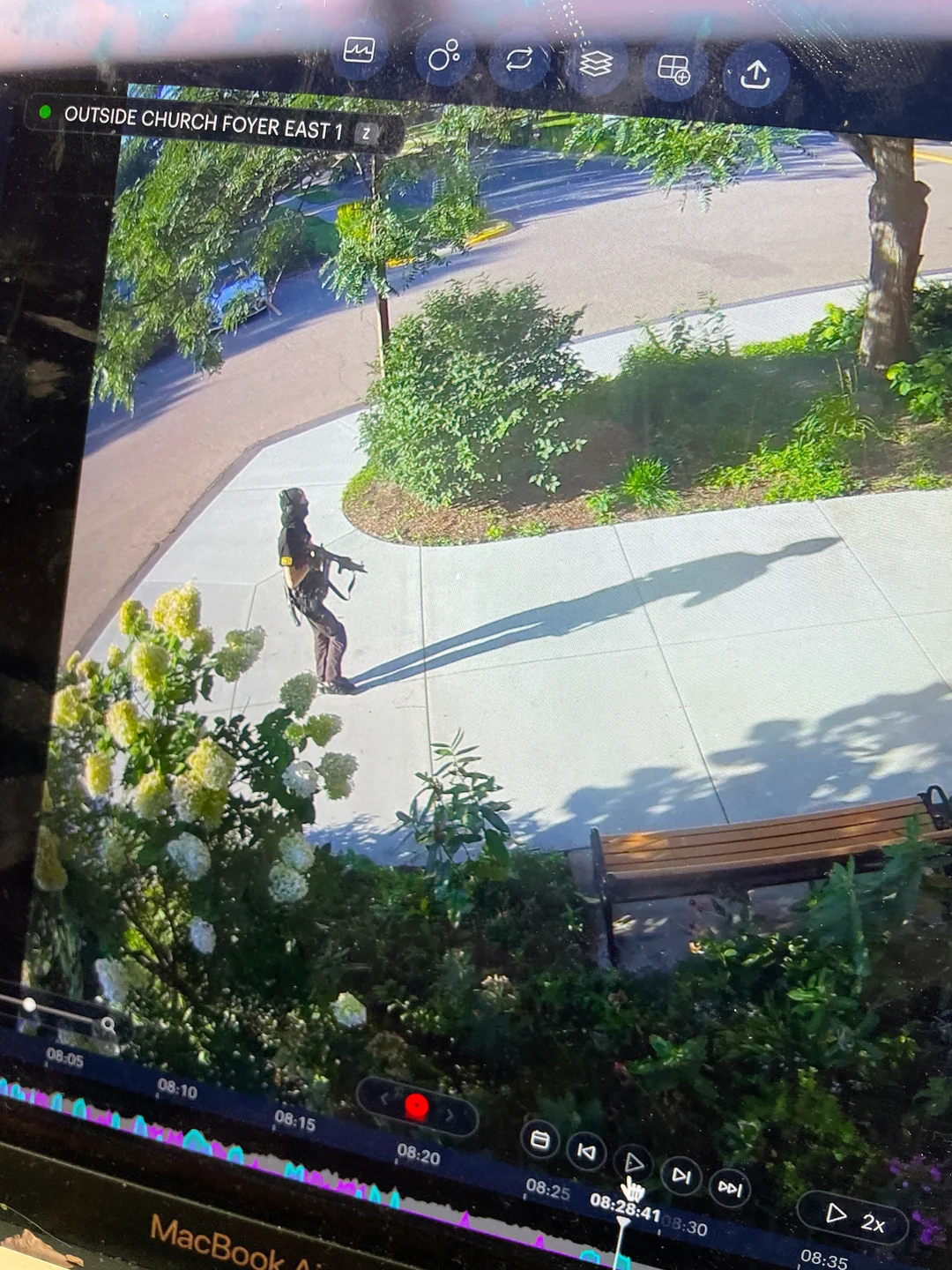
CCTV footage of Robin Westman outside of the church

The attack at the church took place in the first week of classes at Annunciation School, during an all-school Mass scheduled for 8:15 a.m. CDT. Shortly before 8:30 a.m., an individual approached the side of the church and fired dozens of rounds from a rifle through the stained-glass windows towards worshippers inside; police later said the assailant also had a shotgun and a pistol that jammed. The assailant had barricaded at least two exit doors from the outside with lumber, making escape routes for those inside hard to find.

Witnesses later stated that they thought the gunfire was a prank or firecrackers before realizing and dropping to the ground, with the principal shouting shortly after to get down. Others indicated that, during the shooting, they prayed and asked for absolution, believing they were going to die. There were multiple reports of students and adults protecting each other, with one child reportedly being shot in the back while shielding another. A parent stated he felt the school's buddy system of pairing the older children with the younger caused many of the older students to be wounded, as they were upright longer after pushing their younger buddy under the pew.

Many parents and neighbors of the church and school ran towards the gunfire once they realized what it was. A neighbor recounted that, after the first three shots, he realized it was gunfire and ran to the church, where he saw three cartridges on the ground. Another neighbor came across three children fleeing the building and comforted one with a head wound. One mother had just returned home after dropping off her preschool-aged son when the gunfire erupted; she ran back to the church and alerted the teachers. While on her way there, she saw emergency responders and neighbors helping bloodied children out of the church.

The gunfire lasted roughly two minutes, ending when the shooter died by a self inflicted gunshot to the head in the rear parking lot. Approximately 116 rifle bullet casings, one unfired pistol cartridge, and three shotgun shell casings were recovered from the scene. The handgun appeared to have malfunctioned.

The initial 9-1-1 calls came in around 8:27 a.m. Minneapolis Police Department (MPD) officers entered the building within minutes to render aid and rescue students. Paramedics transported victims who were injured to area hospitals, including Hennepin County Medical Center (HCMC). The city directed families to the school building to reunite with students, and a family assistance center for support services was set up. Some students were reunited with their parents in the school's gym.

Shortly after 9 a.m., authorities said that there was no ongoing threat. The response involved the Minnesota State Patrol, the Minnesota Bureau of Criminal Apprehension (BCA), agents from the Federal Bureau of Investigation (FBI), and specialists from the Bureau of Alcohol, Tobacco, Firearms and Explosives (ATF), alongside the MPD and the Minneapolis Fire Department (MFD). The City of Minneapolis gave the all-clear at 9:29 a.m.

== Victims ==
Harper Moyski, 10 years old, and Fletcher Merkel, 8 years old, died in the shooting. Moyski's parents shared a message demanding action to address gun violence. Officials did not immediately release the names of the deceased children; instead, the Merkel and Moyski families identified their children to the public after the attack. Parts of Moyski's remains were discovered inside the church weeks after the shooting took place.

Twenty-eight other people were injured: twenty-four children, three adults (parishioners in their 80s) and a person who sustained a non-gunshot wound. Authorities said the wounded children included elementary- and middle-school students, ages 6 to 15.

Officials said that all of the injured were expected to survive. Several victims were released from hospitals later on the same day, while others sustained more serious injuries.

Critical cases were routed to HCMC while noncritical pediatric patients went to Children's Minnesota Hospital, and noncritical adults to North Memorial Hospital. HCMC's emergency department reported that they treated ten patients overall from the scene. Later that day, the hospital said one adult and five children were in critical condition, and one adult and three children were being treated for non–life-threatening injuries. Four patients required surgery, according to HCMC and city officials. Two children were hospitalized for weeks with severe injuries. One was released from the hospital on September 8 after undergoing two brain surgeries.

== Investigation ==
Local, state, and federal authorities opened a joint investigation led by the Minneapolis Police Department with assistance from the FBI and the ATF. Federal officials stated that the case was being investigated as an act of domestic terrorism and an anti-Catholic hate crime. MPD Chief Brian O'Hara said investigators executed search warrants at three residences in the Twin Cities area and searched a vehicle which was believed to belong to the suspect. Investigators collected and reviewed online materials—including videos and writings which were scheduled to be published on YouTube via time-release. The posts were removed shortly after being released.

Authorities said that the assailant acted alone, had no known criminal history, and used a rifle, a shotgun, and a pistol which were all purchased legally and "recently", according to O'Hara. The ATF assisted with firearms tracing. Investigators said that they were still working to determine a precise motive.

Westman's father's house, located less than one mile (1.6 km) from the church, was cordoned off with crime scene tape and police were stationed outside.

== Perpetrator ==
The perpetrator was identified by law enforcement as 23-year-old Robin M. Westman (born June 17, 2002 – August 27, 2025). Westman's mother had worked at Annunciation School, and Westman had attended Annunciation School before graduating in 2017.

Westman was assigned male at birth and had at one point identified as transgender. Westman's name was legally changed in 2020. In diary entries from before the shooting, Westman expressed disillusionment with being trans. There is no evidence that Westman had begun receiving gender affirming care or hormone replacement therapy.

Westman posted two YouTube videos, showing writings which referenced suicide, "extremely violent thoughts and ideas", a message addressed "to my family and friends", and a drawing of the layout of a church. The video showed messages written on the guns and magazines. These messages included antisemitic, anti-Catholic, and racist phrases, "kill Donald Trump", "6 million wasn't enough", and the names of several mass shooters. The channel was taken down shortly after the uploads.

== Aftermath ==
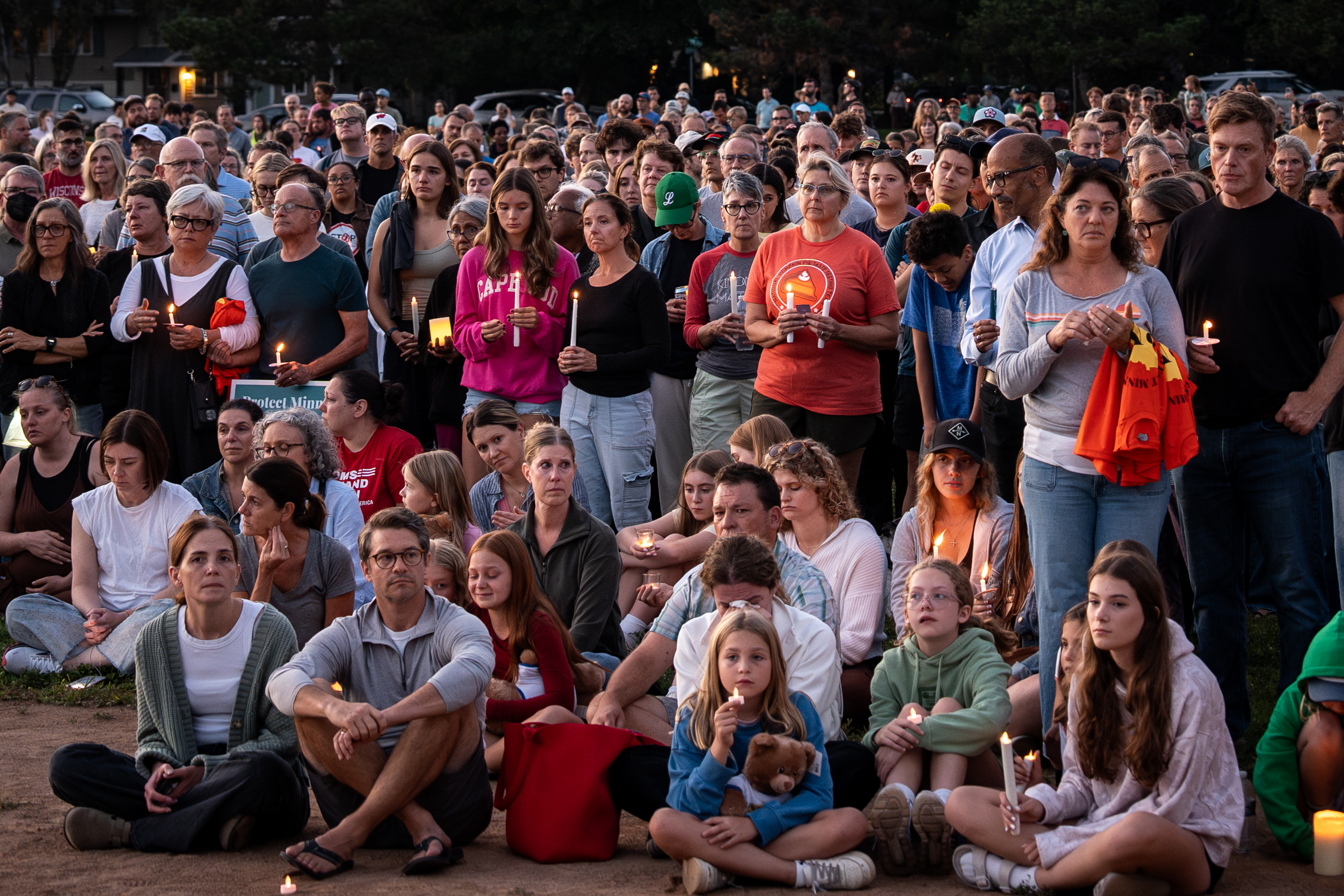
Vigil in Lynnhurst Park the evening after the attack

Parents of both deceased victims issued statements, memorializing their children and thanking the community and their friends and family for support.

Hundreds gathered for a candlelight vigil at Lynnhurst Park in southwest Minneapolis, organized by Protect Minnesota and Moms Demand Action. During the days immediately afterward, mourners created a sidewalk memorial of flowers, notes, and candles outside Annunciation Church.

That evening, more than 600 people attended a prayer vigil at the Academy of Holy Angels, with Archbishop Bernard Hebda, Governor Tim Walz, and Senator Amy Klobuchar in attendance. Pope Leo XIV sent condolences by telegram from the Cardinal Secretary of State, conveying "spiritual closeness" to those affected.

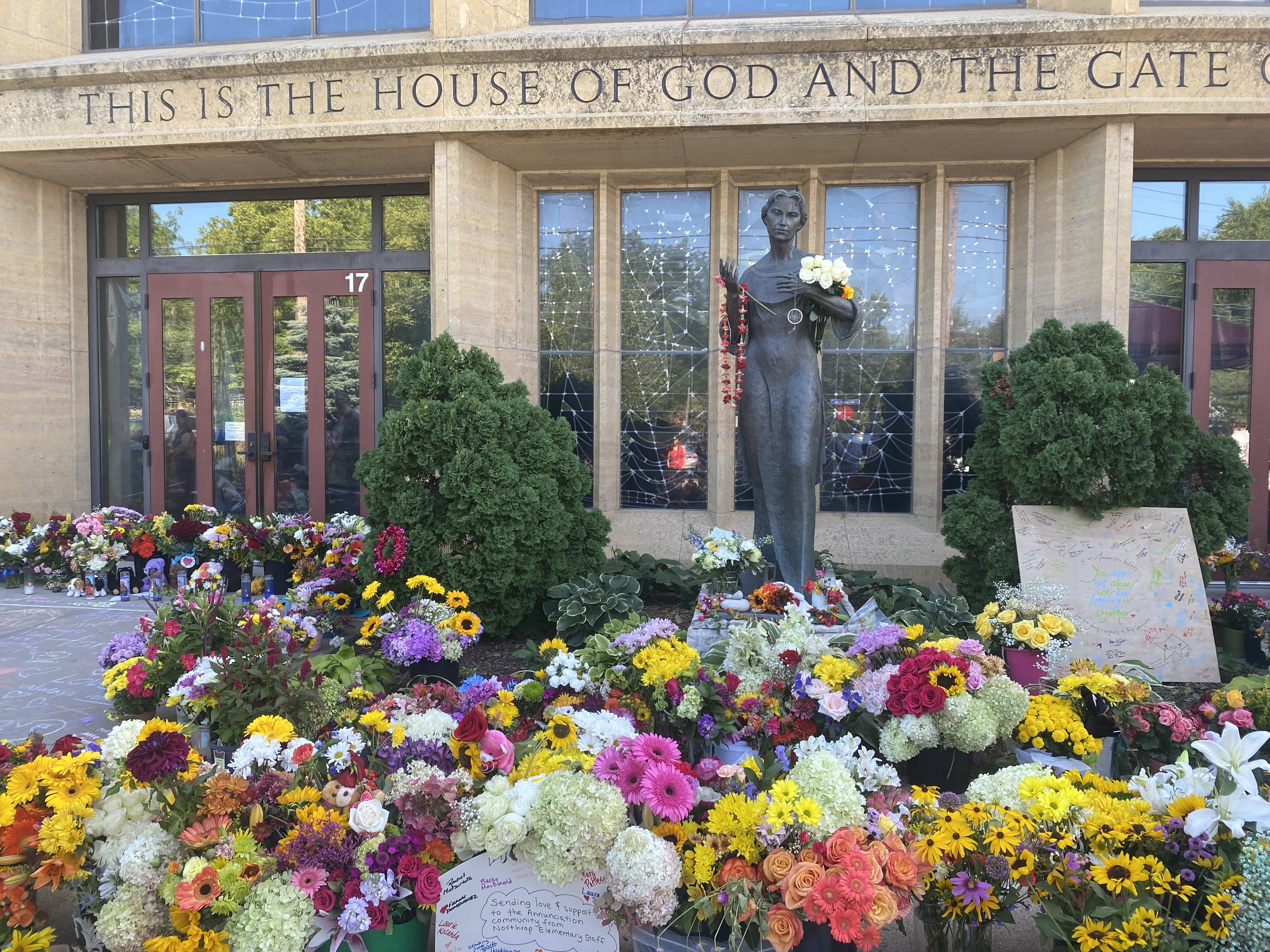
Rows of flowers in front of Annunciation Church on August 31

On September 1, more than 100 students and parents gathered at the Minnesota State Capitol to demand stricter gun laws after the shooting. Many called for a ban on assault weapons and high-capacity magazines. A similar rally was held at the Lake Harriet bandshell, where attendees called for gun control and memorialized victims.

Shortly after the shooting, many Catholic educators and churches began to re-evaluate and reinforce their security protocols. The Archdiocese of Los Angeles Catholic schools said many had to update plans as they had only focused on the attacker gaining entry into the building, while the Archdiocese of Chicago will hold active shooter drills in their churches.

On December 6, 2025, Archbishop Bernard Hebda presided over a Solemn Rite of Reparation at the church, reconsecrating the space for sacred worship. Media were asked not to be present inside for the ceremony.

== Responses ==
=== City and state ===
At a news conference, Mayor Jacob Frey of Minneapolis announced that the city would open a family resource center and urged concrete action beyond expressions of sympathy. "Don't just say this is about thoughts and prayers right now... These kids were literally praying," he said. Frey added, "Anybody who is using this as an opportunity to villainize our transgender community has lost their sense of common humanity." Frey called for state and federal bans on assault weapons and high-capacity magazines.

Minnesota governor Tim Walz called the attack "a tragedy that brought devastation to a place that should be a safe space for children to learn", and ordered state flags flown at half-staff. In response to the shooting, Minnesota lawmaker Tom Emmer called for repealing the state's transgender refuge law passed in 2023.

Westman's uncle Bob Heleringer, a member of the Kentucky House of Representatives from 1980 to 2003, wished that Westman "would've shot me instead of innocent schoolchildren".

=== Federal ===
Vice President JD Vance addresses the shooting; August 28, 2025

President Donald Trump said on Truth Social that he had been briefed on the shooting. He posted "Please join me in praying for everyone involved!" Later on the same day, he released a presidential proclamation ordering that US flags be flown at half-staff nationwide through August 31, 2025. Trump called Walz to offer condolences to Minnesotans.

The FBI said it was assisting local authorities; the Minneapolis field office's special agent in charge said the Bureau would "devote every available resource to support this ongoing investigative effort". According to federal officials and local police the case is being investigated as domestic terrorism and an anti-Catholic hate crime. Both Secretary of Homeland Security Kristi Noem and FBI Director Kash Patel made a point of emphasizing the shooter's gender identity in their statements.

Advisors to the Trump Administration were also quoted by Le Monde as emphasizing the shooter's identity, with Trump advisor Alex Bruesewitz describing the shooter as "another deranged trans terrorist" and Defense Secretary Pete Hegseth's advisor Graham Allen saying that "Trans violence is not only a mental illness. I believe it is demonic possession." Assistant Attorney General for Civil Rights Harmeet Dhillon, a longtime legal advocate against access to transgender healthcare, blamed said care for the shooting - despite no evidence that the shooter had begun medical transition. Congresswoman Marjorie Taylor Greene used the shooting to call for the federal criminalization of transgender care for minors.

When asked whether psychiatric medications might be linked to violent behavior, Secretary of Health and Human Services Robert F. Kennedy Jr. replied that he was "launching studies on the potential contribution of some of the SSRI drugs and some of the other psychiatric drugs that might be contributing to violence". Minnesota Senator Tina Smith responded to his comment on social media, telling him to "just shut up" and "stop peddling bullshit."

Flags at federal facilities were ordered to fly at half-staff nationwide through August 31 by presidential proclamation, and several governors issued parallel state orders.

On September 3, Vice President JD Vance and his wife, Usha, visited Annunciation Church and a local hospital, meeting with families of those affected by the shooting. After the Vances' private visit with the families of the deceased, one of the parents spoke out about the meeting and shared their letter to Vance pushing for common-sense bipartisan legislation to end mass shootings.

Multiple news organizations reported that, in response to the shooting, the United States Department of Justice began looking into ways to limit the ability of transgender people to own firearms.

=== Faith and community ===
Archbishop Bernard Hebda of the Archdiocese of Saint Paul and Minneapolis addressed reporters and released a statement asking for "continued prayers" for the parish and school and saying, "My heart is broken... We need an end to gun violence." Hebda later said that prayers from around the country and a message from Pope Leo XIV had been "a source of hope". The United States Conference of Catholic Bishops vice-president, Archbishop William E. Lori, said, "Let us all beg the Lord for the protection and healing of the entire Annunciation family."

Auxiliary bishop Kevin Kenney met families at Hennepin County Medical Center and told local media "it shouldn't be happening" as clergy offered prayers and support.

=== Sports ===
Before a game at Rogers Centre in Toronto, the Toronto Blue Jays and Minnesota Twins observed a moment of silence for the victims, with "Annunciation Church" displayed on the stadium video board.

Minnesota United FC fans held a moment of silence for the victims during their game against the Portland Timbers and held tifos displaying the names of the two children killed as well as a message calling for an end to gun violence before singing "You Are My Sunshine".

The Minnesota Vikings and Chicago Bears honored the victims of the shooting during the warm ups prior to their game on September 8 wearing shirts that read "Annunciation" on the front and "Be Kind. Be Respectful. Be Inclusive. Be My Best Self. Be Brave." on the back.

In May 2026, the Richfield Little League retired Fletcher's No. 7 jersey. The number will no longer be worn by any player in the league.

=== Conservative commentators ===
Influencers on the right had what Le Monde described as a "unified reaction", in which they framed the shooting as being "trans terrorism" committed by the wider trans community in response to the Trump Administration's continuing crackdown against transgender rights.

Elon Musk and Benny Johnson shared posts falsely alleging a pattern regarding violence and trans identity, despite data showing only 0.11% (5 out of ≈5,700) of mass shooting suspects over the previous decade were transgender. Matt Walsh was quoted as saying "We've defeated them politically. We've defeated them culturally. But understand this: now is precisely the moment when trans militants are the MOST dangerous." Chloe Cole alleged that the shooting could be a natural result of society supporting transgender people in their identities.

Donald Trump Jr. blamed transgender healthcare for the shooting, and said that "there is no more violent group in the world per capita that the radicle [sic] trans community". Trump Jr. also reiterated the falsehood that three other shootings — the 2022 Uvalde school shooting, 2024 Perry High School shooting, and 2024 Apalachee High School shooting — were perpetrated by trans individuals.

=== Advocacy organizations ===
Everytown, Moms Demand Action, and Students Demand Action released a joint statement from their organizations with offices in Minnesota. Everytown president John Feinblatt said, "All signs point to this tragedy being perpetrated by an assault weapon... How many more Americans must die before lawmakers ban these weapons of war?" Moms Demand Action executive director Angela Ferrell-Zabala said, "Our places of education and worship should be places of refuge, not battlefields." A local news roundup quoted a Minnesota Moms Demand Action volunteer calling for change.

The national gun violence prevention group GIFFORDS released a statement through founder Gabby Giffords, who said she was "devastated" by the attack and urged lawmakers to act: "No one should have to fear for their lives when attending religious services... There are solutions that legislators should act on now to prevent another tragic day like today." Sandy Hook Promise co-founder Nicole Hockley said, "Our children deserve more than moments of silence, thoughts and prayers. They deserve action," while co-founder Mark Barden emphasized recognizing warning signs to prevent violence.

The American Federation of Teachers issued a statement from president Randi Weingarten and Teachers Unify to End Gun Violence's Abbey Clements: "We have a moral responsibility to protect our children... Schools should be safe havens... not places for them to be traumatized or have their lives cut short by gun violence."

Gun-control activist and Parkland high school shooting survivor David Hogg said on CNN that Congress should increase CDC and National Institutes of Health funding to study gun violence and argued such funding could pass via budget reconciliation. He criticized Trump's post-Parkland record, saying, "you are a coward, sir… you have the power to end this, but you are not going to because you're a damn coward."

The Uvalde Foundation For Kids, a non-profit formed after the 2022 Uvalde school shooting, announced they were beginning an initiative to raise funds for the families of the victims in the shootings in Minneapolis.

== See also ==
- Columbine effect – Legacy of the 1999 Columbine massacre
- List of house of worship shootings in the United States
- List of mass shootings in the United States in 2025
- List of school shootings in the United States by death toll
- Sutherland Springs church shooting
- 2023 Nashville school shooting, another religious hate crime at a house of worship and school
- 2026 Michigan synagogue attack, another religious hate crime at a house of worship and school
- 2026 Islamic Center of San Diego shooting, another religious hate crime at a house of worship and school
