= LGBTQ rights in Minnesota =

US state–specific LGBTQ rights

- Minnesota (USA)
- Legal status: Legal since 2001
- Gender identity: Transgender people allowed to change legal gender, gender affirming care protected
- Discrimination protections: Sexual orientation and gender identity protections, conversion therapy ban

Family rights
- Recognition of relationships: Same-sex marriage since 2013
- Adoption: Full adoption rights since 2013

Lesbian, gay, bisexual, transgender, and queer (LGBTQ) people in the U.S. state of Minnesota have the same legal rights as non-LGBTQ people. Minnesota became the first U.S. state to outlaw discrimination based on sexual orientation and gender identity in 1993, protecting LGBTQ people from discrimination in the fields of employment, housing, and public accommodations. In 2013, the state legalized same-sex marriage, after a bill allowing such marriages was passed by the Minnesota Legislature and subsequently signed into law by Governor Mark Dayton. This followed a 2012 ballot measure in which voters rejected constitutionally banning same-sex marriage.

Minnesota is frequently referred to as one of the most LGBTQ-friendly states in the Midwestern United States. Though legislation outlawing same-sex sexual activity remained in statutes until 2023, it had been invalidated since 2001 when the state's Supreme Court ruled it unconstitutional. In July 2021, an executive order was signed and implemented banning conversion therapy state-wide. Some cities within Minnesota had previously banned conversion therapy by local ordinances. In Spring 2023, the state passed a law banning conversion therapy and a "trans refuge" law, protecting access to gender-affirming care.

== History of the law regarding same-sex sexual activity ==
=== Pre-colonial America ===
Before the arrival of the Europeans, there were no known legal or social punishments for engaging in homosexual activity. Several Native American tribes recognized individuals who would act, behave and live as the opposite biological sex, nowadays also called "two-spirit". The Dakota people refer to male-bodied individuals who act as female as winkta. They are ikwekaazo (literally "men who chose to function as women") among the Ojibwe. Likewise, female-bodied individuals who act and live as males are ininiikaazo (literally "women who choose to function as men").

=== Early Minnesota ===
In 1849, the Minnesota Territory was given Wisconsin's laws, including a ban on heterosexual and homosexual sodomy, which was defined by the common law. When Minnesota drafted its own criminal code in 1851, it kept this prohibition. In 1909, the penalty for sodomy was increased to 20 years' imprisonment, and in 1921, the Minnesota Legislature expanded the definition of sodomy to include fellatio (oral sex). Beyond the criminal laws, vagrancy laws banned anyone from soliciting for "immoral purposes".

In 1939, a wave of child molestation cases in Saint Paul led to the enactment of a psychopathic offender law, which included LGBTQ people alongside rapists and child molesters. Though justified by the need to protect children and others from sexual abuse, those convicted of homosexuality constituted the major part of those imprisoned under it.

=== Mid 20th century ===
In 1967, the penalty for sodomy was reduced from a felony to a misdemeanor, punishable by up to one year in jail and/or a fine of $1,000 dollars. An attempt to repeal the sodomy law failed in the Minnesota House of Representatives in 1973 by a vote of 46–69 with 19 abstentions.

=== 1980s ===
In State v. Blom (1984), the Minnesota Supreme Court ruled that the criminal ban on sodomy also applied to the act of cunnilingus. In 1987 in State v. Gray, the court rejected the argument that privacy rights applied to sodomy involving prostitution. However, the court did recognize that the State Constitution protected privacy rights, although it stopped short of stating whether or not private, adult, consensual and non-commercial sodomy was covered under the right to privacy.

=== Doe v. Ventura (2001) ===
In Doe et al. v. Ventura et al. (2001), State District Court Judge Delila F. Pierce ruled that the sodomy law violated the State Constitution when dealing with private, adult, consensual, and non-commercial sodomy. The ruling was later certified as being a class action lawsuit and the state did not appeal, thus voiding the law in terms of private, consensual, non-commercial acts of sodomy by consenting adults, two years before Lawrence v. Texas.

=== Sodomy law repeal ===
In May 2023, an "Omnibus Judiciary and Public Safety Bill" passed the Minnesota Legislature and was signed into law by Governor Tim Walz to formally repeal the defunct and archaic sodomy law. The legislation took effect immediately.

== Recognition of same-sex relationships ==
Same-sex marriage became legal in Minnesota on August 1, 2013. There are also domestic partnership ordinances in 18 cities:

- Minneapolis since 1991
- Duluth since 2009
- St. Paul since 2009
- Edina since 2010
- Maplewood since 2010
- Golden Valley since 2010
- Rochester since 2010
- St. Louis Park since 2011
- Richfield since 2011
- Red Wing since 2011
- Robbinsdale since 2011
- Hopkins since 2011
- Falcon Heights since 2011
- Shorewood since 2011
- Shoreview since 2011
- Crystal since 2011
- Eagan since 2012
- Eden Prairie since 2012

=== Baker v. Nelson ===
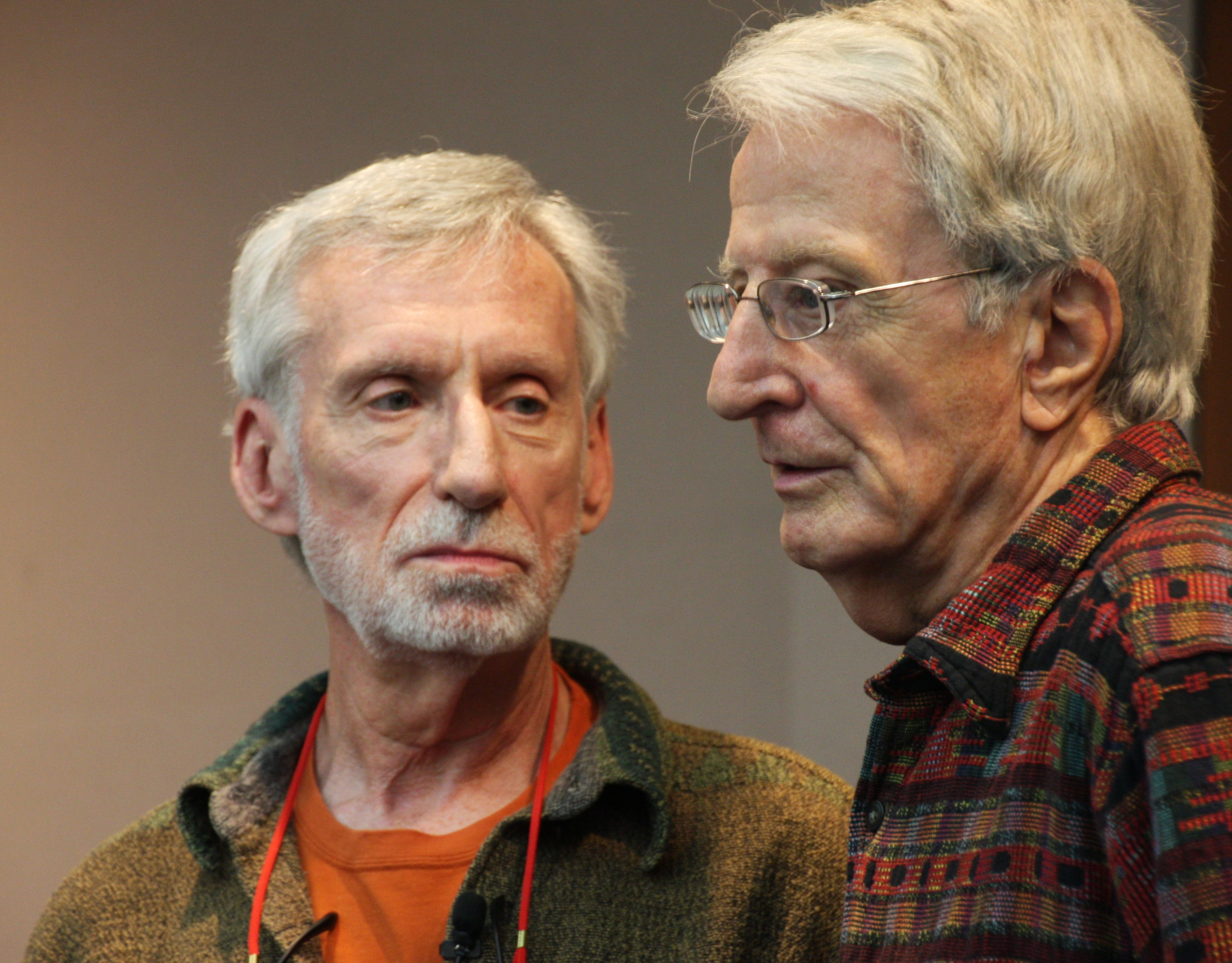
Jack Baker and Michael McConnell, seen here in 2016

In 1972, activist Jack Baker filed a lawsuit against the Hennepin County District Court Clerk Gerald R. Nelson, after being denied a marriage license to his partner Michael McConnell. The case resulted in the Minnesota Supreme Court ruling that Minnesota law limited marriage to opposite-sex couples and doing so did not violate the State Constitution or the United States Constitution. Although Baker subsequently appealed to the U.S. Supreme Court, his appeal was dismissed with a one-sentence ruling.

=== Minnesota Amendment 1 ===
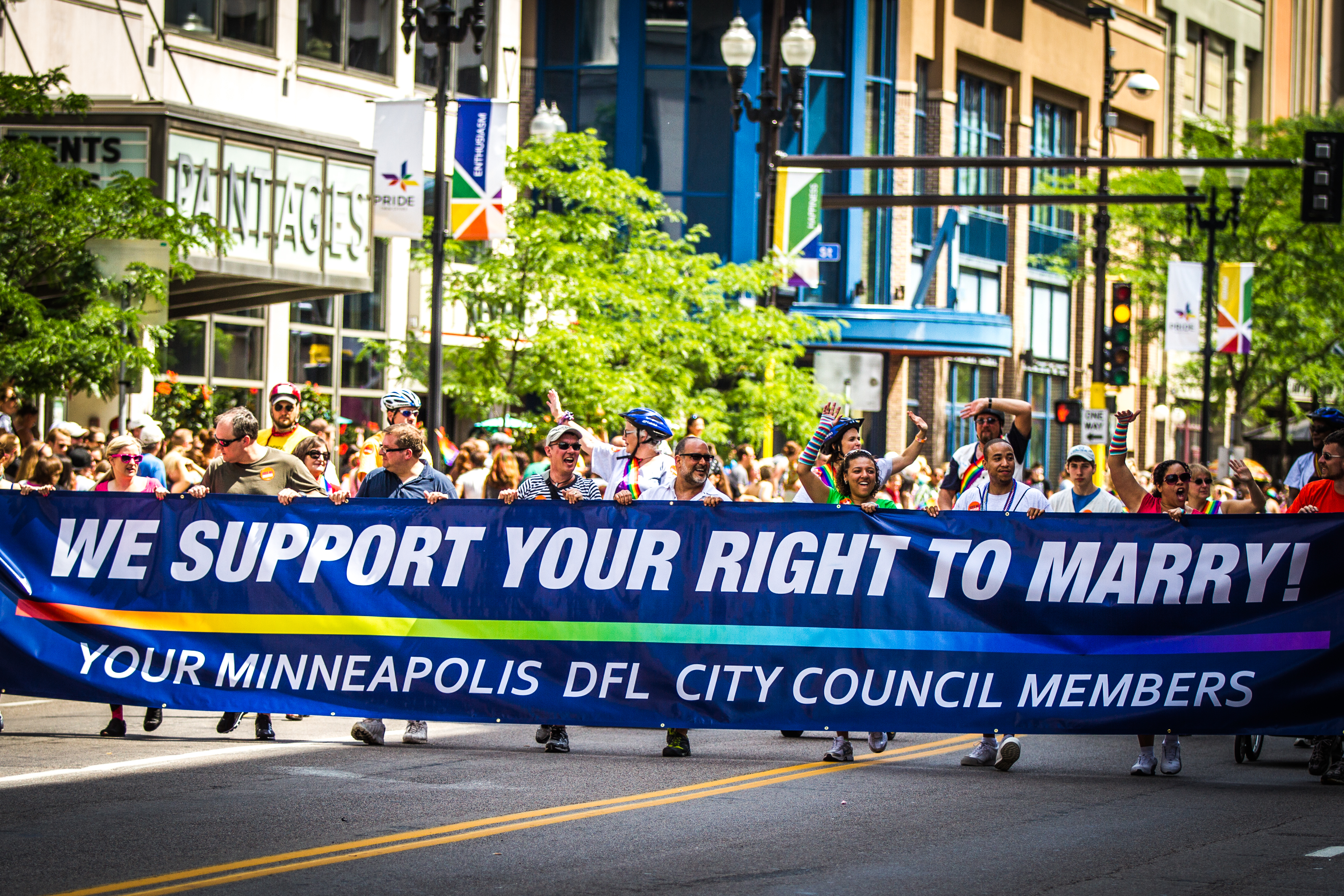
The Minneapolis City Council expressed opposition to Minnesota Amendment 1 in 2012.

On November 6, 2012, Minnesota voters by a margin of 51.5% to 47.5% with 1% abstention defeated a proposed amendment to the State Constitution that would have banned same-sex marriage in Minnesota.

=== Legalization ===
On February 28, 2013, a bill was introduced in the Minnesota Legislature to legalize same-sex marriage in the state. On May 9, 2013, it passed the House of Representatives by 75–59 votes, and on May 13 the Senate passed the bill by a vote of 37–30. Governor Mark Dayton signed the bill into law on May 14. The legislation took effect on August 1, 2013, which was the day the first same-sex couples began marrying in the state.

== Hunting club court settlement ==
In August 2014, Minnesota laws on both marriage and employment discrimination based on sexual orientation were upheld and declared valid by a settlement in court in the case of a same-sex couple and a hunting club that refused their wedding.

== Discrimination protections ==
In 1989, Governor Rudy Perpich created a state commission to study the prospect of adding sexual orientation to the Minnesota Human Rights Act. The commission proposal was not passed by the Minnesota Legislature, but the subsequent governor, Arne Carlson, formed a similar committee in 1990.

In 1992, Governor Carlson signed an executive order that prohibited discrimination based on sexual orientation in state employment. In 1993, Minnesota amended its statutes to prohibit discrimination based on a person's sexual orientation and/or gender identity in housing, insurance, goods and services, contracts, health benefits, hospital visitation rights, and employment.

The Minnesota Human Rights Act uses the following definition with regards to the phrase "sexual orientation"; "Sexual orientation" means having or being perceived as having an emotional, physical, or sexual attachment to another person without regard to the sex of that person or having or being perceived as having an orientation for such attachment, or having or being perceived as having a self-image or identity not traditionally associated with one's biological maleness or femaleness. "Sexual orientation" does not include a physical or sexual attachment to children by an adult. The 1993 law does not apply to religious organizations, youth groups and certain small businesses - reclassified and reimplemented by new 2024 legislation passed in May, that maintained this explicit exemption.

The 1993 addition of sexual orientation to the Minnesota Human Rights Act also included the insertion of provisions stating that the "state of Minnesota does not condone homosexuality or bisexuality or any equivalent lifestyle", or "authorize the promotion of homosexuality or bisexuality in education institutions". No bill has yet been introduced to repeal these provisions.

In May 2023, the Minnesota Senate passed a bill to add “sexual orientation and gender identity or expression” to the Minnesota Constitution. The bill is awaiting a vote within the Minnesota House of Representatives.

=== Reforms to discrimination laws ===
In May 2023, an “omnibus community justice bill” passed the Minnesota Legislature and was signed into law by the Governor of Minnesota to (1) formally repeal the defunct and archaic 1993 “condemning homosexuality” law; (2) explicitly adding “gender identity” separately from sexual orientation and to also (3) repeal all exemptions for "nonpublic service organizations," such as the Boy Scouts, within anti-discrimination provisions. The legislation goes into effect immediately.

=== Hate crime law ===
In 1989, Minnesota laws were expanded to cover hate crimes based on a person's sexual orientation. In 1993, sexual orientation was expanded to include the category of gender identity. The law provides additional penalties for certain crimes committed based on the victim(s)' sexual orientation or gender identity, alongside other categories such as race, religion or sex.

== Adoption and parenting ==
In August 2024, a same-sex couple within Minnesota won a court case regarding parentage. Sperm and egg donors under Minnesota legislation are explicitly “automatically denied parentage” - regardless of circumstance. Minnesota law allows single LGBTQ people to petition to adopt children, whilst there is no specific prohibition against joint adoption petitions or stepchild petitions by same-sex couples. The state's only organization solely dedicated to finding families for Minnesota's children, the Minnesota Adoption Resource Network, allows same-sex partners to adopt in identical fashion to single people and opposite-sex partners.

Lesbian couples have access to in vitro fertilization. State law recognizes the non-genetic, non-gestational mother as a legal parent to a child born via donor insemination, but only if the parents are married. Surrogacy is neither expressly prohibited nor permitted in Minnesota, but the courts have generally ruled in favor of couples, same-sex or opposite-sex, using the gestational or traditional surrogacy process. A proposed law, the Minnesota Gestational Carrier Act, aims to consolidate existing case law, streamline the surrogacy process, and protect all parties involved.

== Guardianship ==
On December 17, 1991, in a landmark ruling, the Minnesota Court of Appeals, overturning a lower court ruling in In re Guardianship of Kowalski, awarded guardianship of Sharon Kowalski, brain-damaged in an accident eight years earlier, to her lesbian partner Karen Thompson over the objections of Kowalski's parents.

== Transgender rights ==
Changing legal gender on Minnesota birth certificates and other identity documents does not require undergoing sex reassignment surgery. The state will issue a new birth certificate upon receipt of a letter from a physician confirming appropriate clinical treatment for gender transition or a court order for gender change. The applicant must also sign a "Birth Certificate Application" form in front of a notary and pay the applicable fee. The registrar will issue a new birth certificate and the old certificate will remain confidential. The Minnesota Driver and Vehicle Services will update a driver's license or state ID card upon request of the individual. No documentation is required.

=== Health insurance ===
The state's Medicaid policy covers care related to transgender people. Minnesota law prohibits health insurance providers from excluding coverage for transgender-specific care or discriminating against transgender patients.

=== Legal sex designation ===
Since October 2018, Minnesota has allowed an "X" sex descriptor on driver's licences and state ID cards. No such option is available for birth certificates. The Driver and Vehicle Services will issue an "M", "F", or "X" on a license or state ID upon request of the individual. No documentation is required. The "X" option can be requested by intersex people, non-binary people, and people whose sex is ambiguous at birth, for example.

=== Gender affirming care ===
In March 2023, an executive order was signed by the Governor of Minnesota to legally protect gender-affirming services and care for individuals anywhere inside Minnesota. In April 2023, the Minnesota Legislature passed a bill nicknamed the "Trans Refuge Bill," House File 146, which formally codified this executive order as permanent Minnesota state legislation. The Governor of Minnesota Tim Walz signed the bill into law, effective immediately.

=== Sports ===
The Minnesota high school transgender athlete policy has been challenged in the courts by attorneys representing 3 school softball players.

== Conversion therapy ==
=== State law ===
In April 2023, the Minnesota Legislature formally passed a bill to codify and implement to legally ban conversion therapy practices on individuals. The bill was formally signed into law by the Governor of Minnesota Tim Walz and went into legal effect on August 1st, 2023.

=== Executive order ===
In July 2021, an executive order was signed and implemented to ban conversion therapy within Minnesota.

=== City ordinances ===
In November 2019, Minneapolis became the first city in Minnesota to ban conversion therapy on minors. The ordinance was passed unanimously by the Minneapolis City Council. On January 15, 2020, the city of Duluth became the second city in Minnesota to ban the practice of conversion therapy. In June 2020, both St. Paul and Red Wing followed suit, followed by Winona in August 2020, Rochester in September 2020, and Robbinsdale in February 2021. From January 3, 2022, in Bloomington. Since October 2022, Richfield also passed and implemented a local ordinance to ban conversion therapy.

== State Council For LGBTQ Minnesotans ==
Since August 2023, the Minnesota Legislature implemented and set up the 16-member "State Council For LGBTQ Minnesotans".

== Gay panic defense ==
In May 2024, the Minnesota Senate just barely passed a bill to abolish the archaic “gay and trans panic defense”, by an extremely close vote of 34-33. The bill previously passed by a voice vote within the Minnesota House of Representatives months earlier. The Governor of Minnesota Tim Walz signed the extensive “omnibus justice reforms bill” into law on the 29th May, 2024 - that included an additional provision added abolishing the “gay and trans panic defense”. The law went into effect on August 1, 2024.

== Book protection ==
In May 2024, Governor Tim Walz signed a bill into law protecting books within Minnesota libraries.

== Living conditions ==
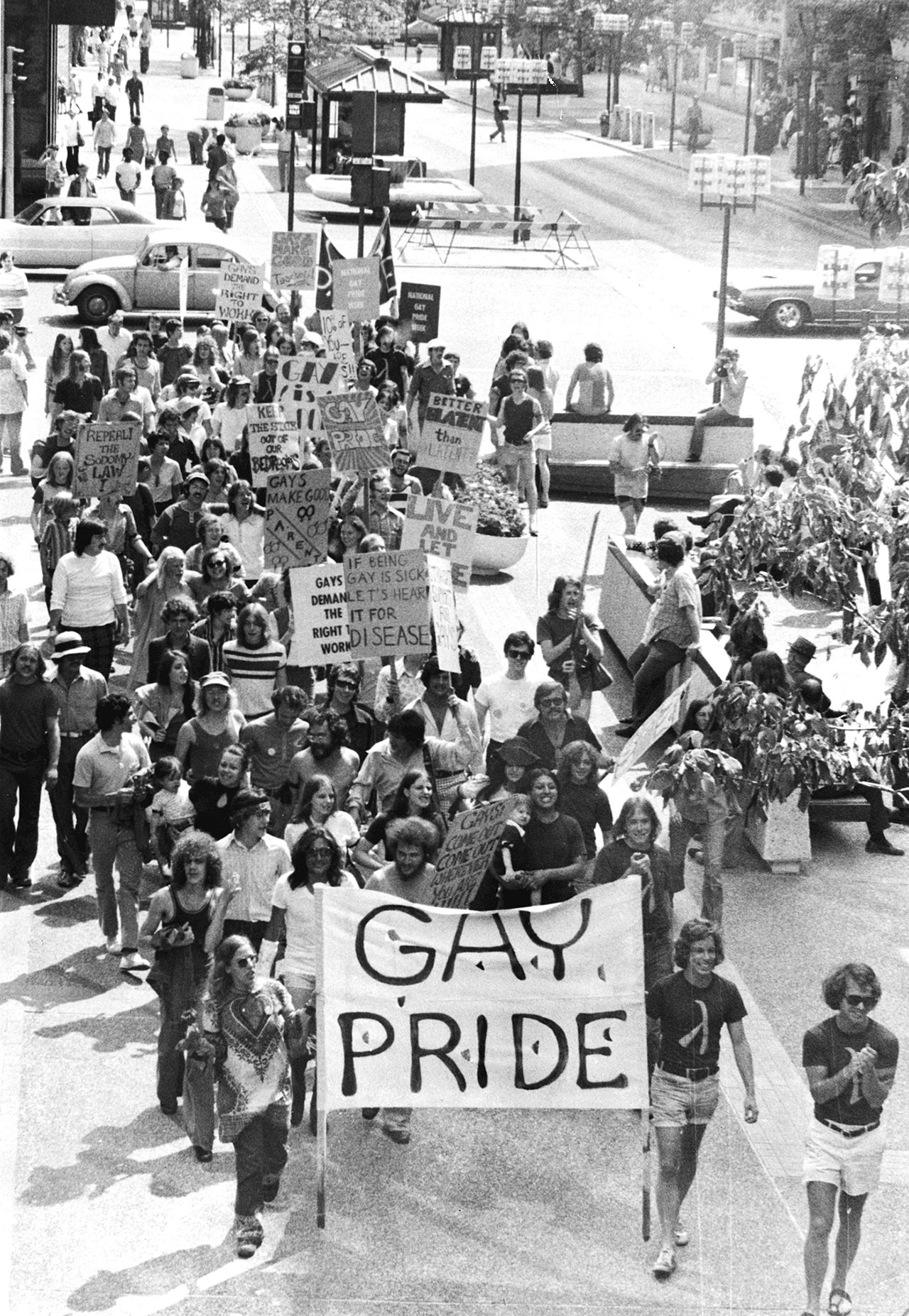
A gay pride march in Minneapolis on June 30, 1973

The LGBT think tank Movement Advancement Project ranks Minnesota first, tied to Illinois, in the Midwestern United States in terms of LGBT rights legislation, noting that the state provides protection from discrimination in employment, housing, public accommodations, and credit, has inclusive health care policies particularly relating to transgender people, and permits transgender people to correct the gender marker on their identity documents by self-identification. However, these policies and laws are relatively recent, dating from the past three decades.

Societal attitudes regarding LGBTQ people and same-sex relationships have evolved drastically in recent decades, going from antipathy and hostility to acceptance and tolerance, though Minnesota was always at the forefront of the early LGBT rights movement in the United States. In 1969, shortly before the Stonewall riots, an LGBT student group called FREE (Fight Repression of Erotic Expression) by founded by several students at the University of Minnesota. The group was the second of its kind in the United States, following the Student Homophile League at Columbia University in 1967.

=== Marriage license ===
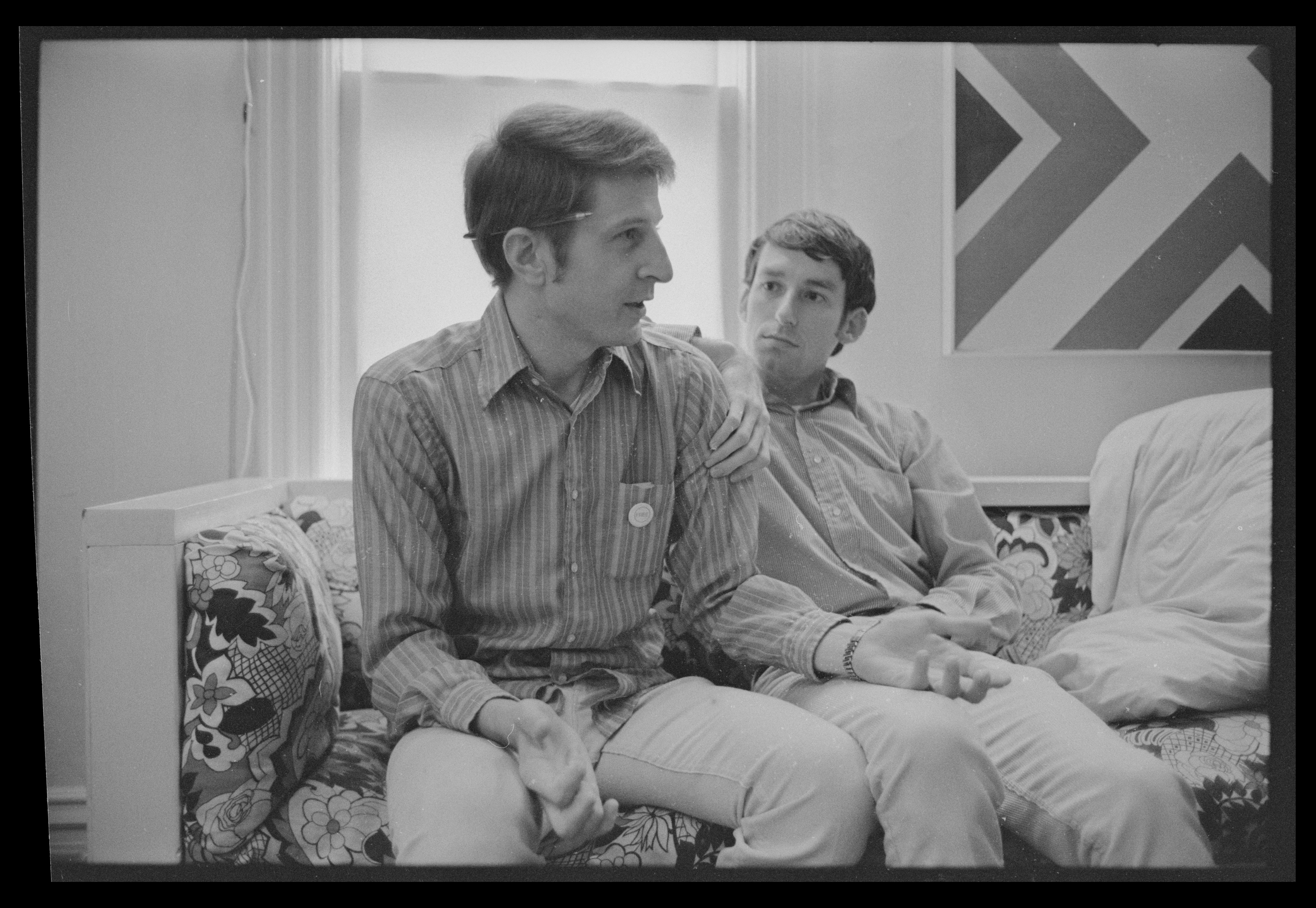
Jack Baker and Michael McConnell at home, Minneapolis, Minnesota

Its president, activist, and law student Jack Baker, requested a marriage license with his partner Michael McConnell in May 1970 in Hennepin County, and after being rejected by the county clerk, filed a lawsuit, Baker v. Nelson, in state court. The case eventually made its way to the Minnesota Supreme Court and the Supreme Court of the United States, which both dismissed the plaintiffs' claims. McConnell and Baker held a marriage ceremony in Blue Earth County in 1971 after McConnell legally changed his name to the gender-neutral name Pat. The marriage was never annulled, and the National Archives at Kansas City has confirmed that "McConnell and Baker's marriage license [from Blue Earth County] was never revoked. They are still married and have been for the last forty-two years".

=== Gay representatives in state government ===
In 1972, Allan Spear was elected to the Minnesota Senate; he came out as gay in 1974, making him one of the first openly gay elected officials in the world. Spear would later serve as President of the Senate from 1992 to 2000. Karen Clark was elected to the Minnesota House of Representatives in 1980, becoming its first openly lesbian member. She would serve until 2019, being re-elected every two years.

=== Jean-Nickolaus Tretter ===
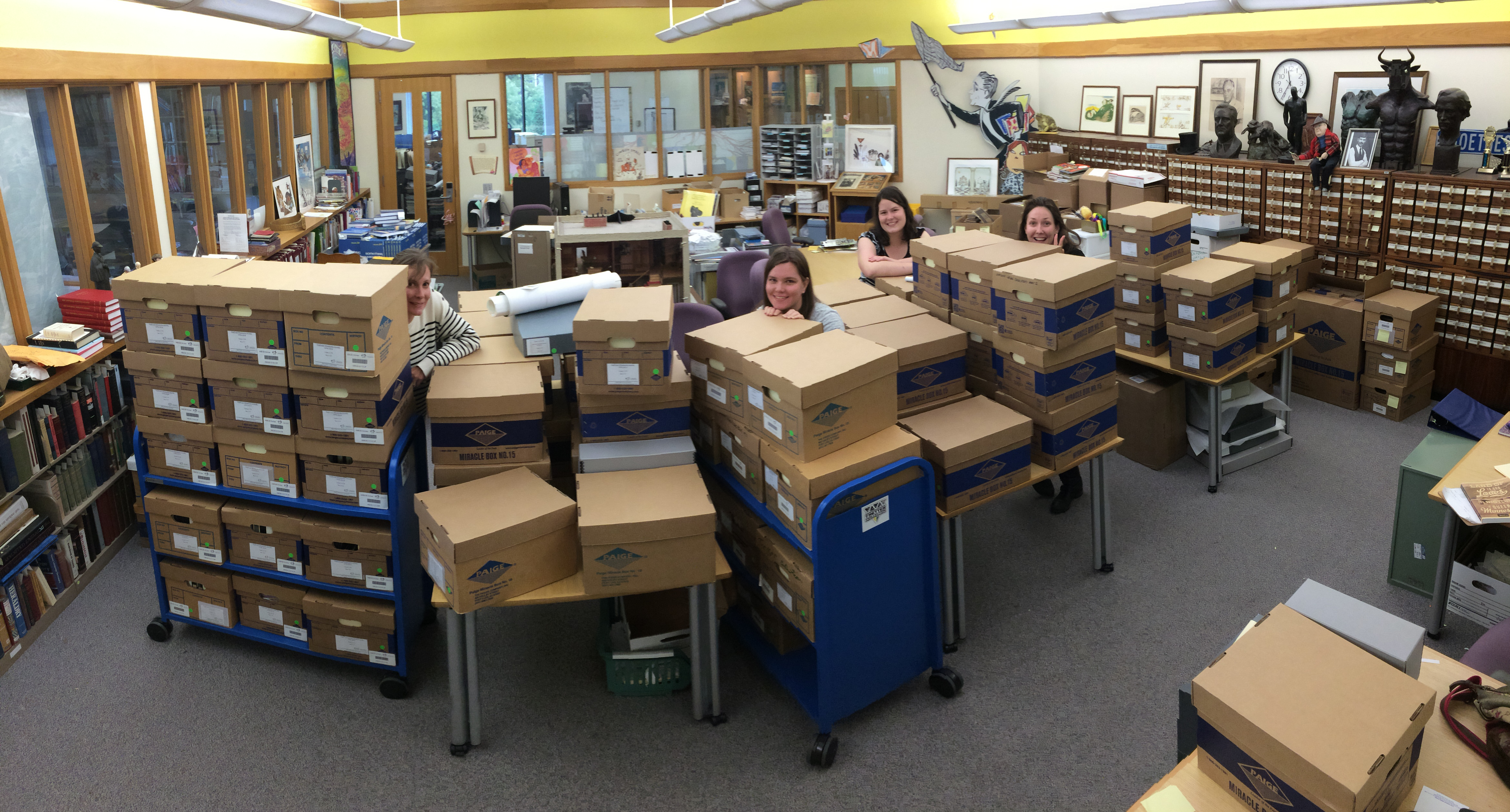
Jean-Nickolaus Tretter staff with the Outfront Minnesota Collection

Jean Tretter, who started the Jean-Nickolaus Tretter Collection in Gay, Lesbian, Bisexual, and Transgender Studies in the 1950s, which hosts over 40,000 LGBT historical materials, claimed that Minnesota's early role in the LGBT rights movement was due to "migration from the surrounding areas, like North and South Dakota or Iowa. You wanted to live in the big city in the gay ghettos and you could find people and friends". Tretter has also credited the Scandinavian history in the region, noting that "the Lutheran church has always been more accepting of gays and lesbians". Minneapolis became widely known as a "gay mecca", despite frequent police raids and harassment in and around gay bars and clubs throughout the 1960s and 70s.

=== Changing public opinion ===
In 1978, voters in Saint Paul repealed the city's provisions protecting gays and lesbians from discrimination, a setback for LGBT activists. Over the following years, LGBT groups began slowly to raise awareness of their cause and enter the public eye. They encountered important political victories in 1990 when St. Paul reinstated its protections for LGBTQ people, a move later upheld by voters, and in 1993 when the state became the first in the country to prohibit unfair discrimination based on sexual orientation and gender identity in employment, housing and public accommodations. Same-sex sexual activity was finally legalized in the state in 2001. From the 2000s onwards, LGBT causes became more mainstream. Public opinion also began to increase, and become more accepting. State voters rejected a constitutional amendment to ban same-sex marriage in 2012, and subsequently, the Minnesota Legislature passed legislation to open marriage to same-sex couples the following year, over forty years after McConnell and Baker had applied for a marriage license. Minnesota became the 12th state in the country to legalize same-sex marriage. The first two couples were married on August 1, 2013, at midnight by Mayor R. T. Rybak in Minneapolis.

=== Contemporary ===
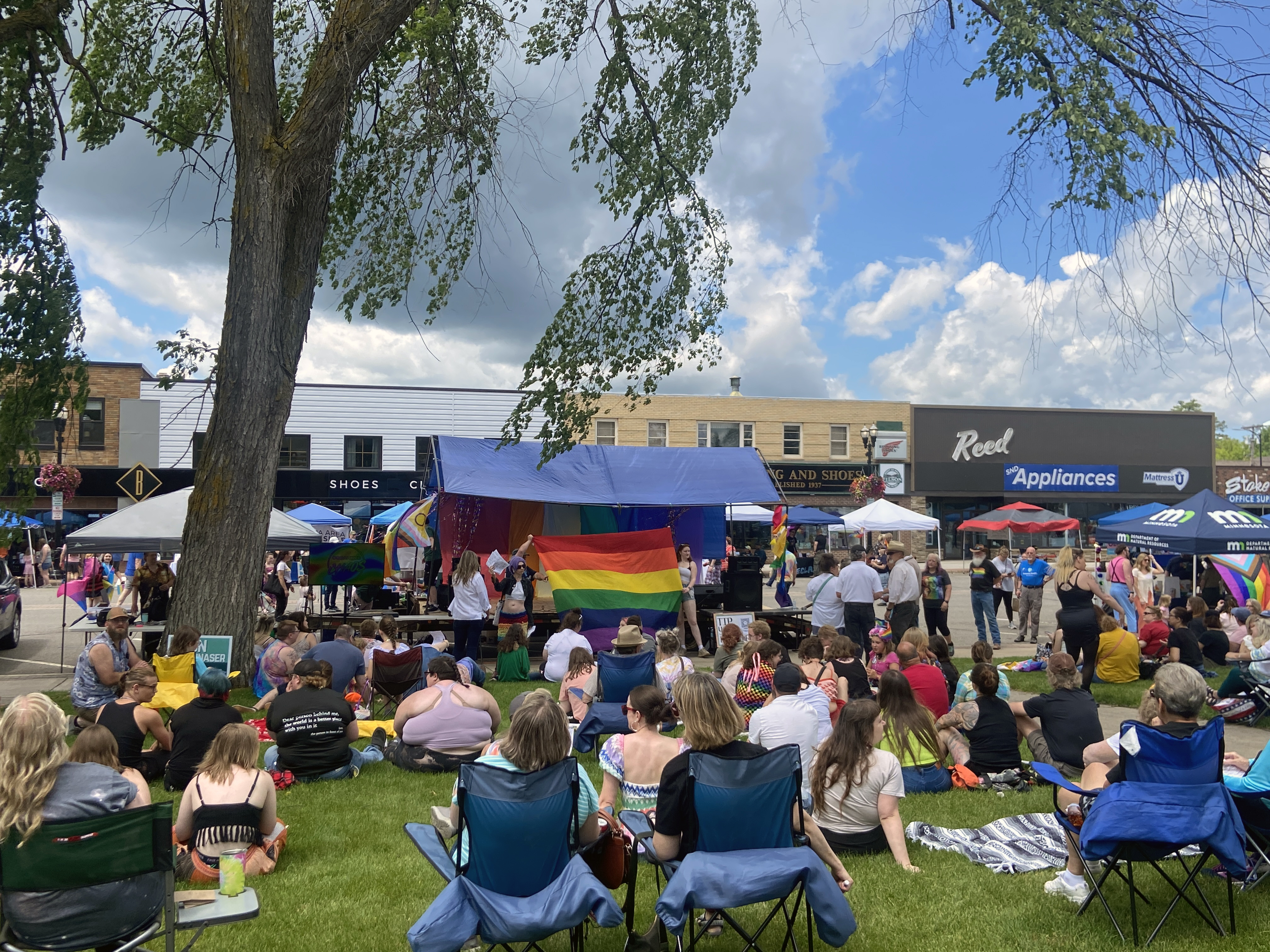
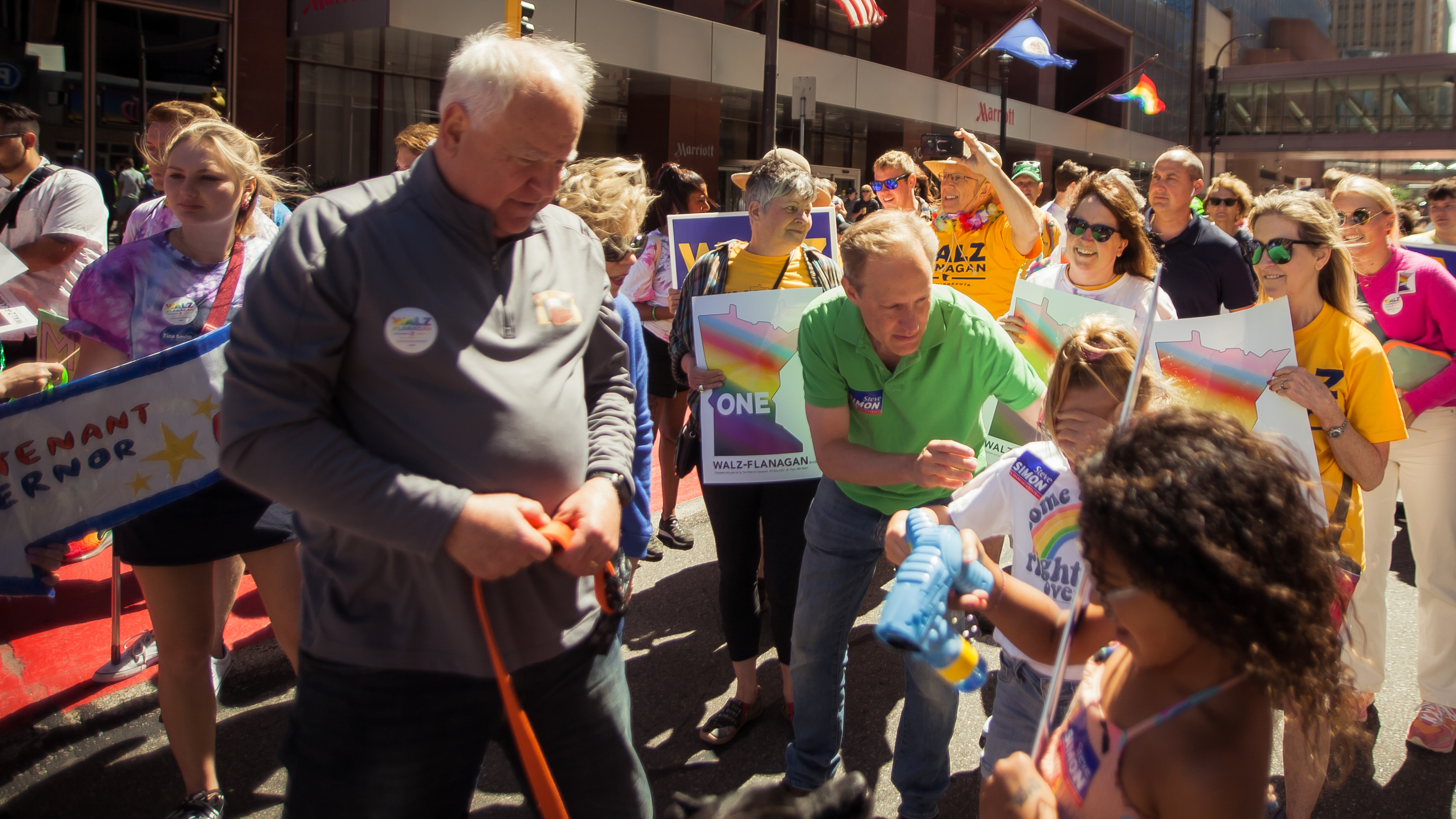
1: Itasca Pride, Grand Rapids, 2024; 2: Gov. Tim Walz in Twin Cities Pride Parade, 2022

Today, the Twin Cities metro area has a vibrant LGBT culture, scene, and nightlife, with annual pride events, community centers, bars, clubs, cafés, and other venues. In 2015, an estimated 400,000 people attended the Twin Cities Pride parade, named the Ashley Rukes GLBT Pride Parade. The first gay march in Minnesota took place in 1972 in downtown Minneapolis, on the third anniversary of the Stonewall riots. It was attended by around 50 people. Outside of the Twin Cities, annual pride events are held in large cities such as Duluth, Moorhead, St. Cloud and Rochester. In smaller more rural communities, the LGBT community is less visible, and prevailing social attitudes tend to be more conservative, though many small and rural communities are starting to host their own Pride festivals.

A small LGBT group exists in Brainerd and another small group, SOHR (Sexual Orientation and Human Rights), now called the Prairie Equality Initiative, exists for the west-central lakes region.

In July 2024, Rainbow Health (a lifesaving LGBT HIV prevention clinic) unexpectedly closed and shut down within the twin city area of Minnesota.

== Public opinion ==
A 2022 poll by the Public Religion Research Institute (PRRI) found that 77% of Minnesota residents supported same-sex marriage, while 21% were opposed and 2% were unsure. Additionally, 82% supported discrimination protections covering sexual orientation and gender identity. 16% were opposed.

Public opinion for LGBTQ anti-discrimination laws in Minnesota
Poll source	Timeframe	Sample size	Support	Oppose	No opinion
PRRI	Jan. - Dec. 2019	945	72%	21%	7%
PRRI	Jan. - Dec. 2018	1,070	70%	22%	8%
PRRI	Apr. - Dec. 2017	1,412	74%	20%	6%
PRRI	Apr. 2015 - Jan. 2016	1,496	73%	24%	4%

== Summary table ==
Same-sex sexual activity legal with an equal age of consent (16)	Yes (Since 2001; codified in 2023)
Criminalization of attempted book bans implemented	Yes (Since 2024)
Anti-discrimination laws for both sexual orientation and gender identity in all areas	Yes (Since 1993)
Same-sex marriages	Yes (Since 2013)
Both joint and stepchild adoption by same-sex couples	Yes (Since 2013)
Lesbian, gay and bisexual people allowed to serve openly in the US military	Yes (Since 2011)
Transgender people allowed to serve openly in the US military	No (Since 2025)
Intersex people allowed to serve openly in the military	No
Right to change legal gender without surgery	Yes (Since 2023)
"Gay or trans panic defense" under common-law repealed	Yes (Since 2024)
Access to IVF for lesbian couples and parantage on birth certificates	Yes
Conversion therapy banned on minors	Yes (Since 2021)

== See also ==
- LGBT rights in the United States
- Minnesota Family Council
- Parents Action League
- Politics of Minnesota
