= Minnesota House File 146 =

2023 Minnesota law

Minnesota Legislature
- Long title: A bill for an act relating to children; preventing the use of subpoenas to gather information for out-of-state laws interfering in the use of gender-affirming health care; amending child custody and child welfare provisions related to out-of-state laws interfering in the use of gender-affirming health care; amending provisions related to warrants, arrests, and extraditions related to out-of-state laws on gender-affirming health care; amending Minnesota Statutes 2022, sections 518D.201; 518D.204; 518D.207; 629.02; 629.05; 629.06; 629.13; 629.14; proposing coding for new law in Minnesota Statutes, chapters 260; 543.
- Territorial extent: Minnesota
- Enacted by: Minnesota House of Representatives
- Enacted: March 23, 2023
- Enacted by: Minnesota Senate
- Enacted: April 21, 2023
- Signed by: Tim Walz
- Signed: April 27, 2023
- Effective: April 27, 2023

Legislative history

First chamber: Minnesota House of Representatives
- Bill title: House File 146
- Introduced by: Leigh Finke
- Introduced: January 9, 2023
- First reading: January 9, 2023
- Second reading: February 27, 2023
- Third reading: March 23, 2023
- Voting summary: 68 voted for; 62 voted against

Second chamber: Minnesota Senate
- Received from the Minnesota House of Representatives: March 27, 2023
- Member(s) in charge: Erin Maye Quade
- First reading: March 27, 2023
- Second reading: April 12, 2023
- Third reading: April 21, 2023
- Voting summary: 34 voted for; 30 voted against; 6 absent

Summary
- Prohibits the enforcement of out-of-state laws regarding gender-affirming medical care in Minnesota and adds other protections to access of gender-affirming care.
- Status: In force

Minnesota House File 146 (HF 146) is a 2023 law in the state of Minnesota that protects access to gender-affirming care for minors. Governor Tim Walz signed it on April 27, 2023, and it became effective immediately. HF 146 is commonly referred to as a "shield" or "sanctuary" law due to its protections from out-of-state law enforcement, thereby making Minnesota a trans refuge state. Around the time this law was passed, Minnesota's neighboring state passed laws limiting access to gender-affirming care.

HF 146 was introduced by Leigh Finke, Minnesota's first openly transgender lawmaker. The bill passed in the Minnesota House of Representatives by a vote of 68-62 and in the Minnesota Senate by a vote of 34-30. The law followed an executive order signed by Walz that protected gender-affirming medical care and prohibited the enforcement of out-of-state laws regarding such care, similar to HF 146. Following the 2025 Annunciation Catholic Church shooting, U.S. representative Tom Emmer called for the repeal of HF 146.

== Provisions ==
House File 146 prohibits the enforcement of out-of-state laws regarding gender-affirming medical care in the state of Minnesota. The state can also take jurisdiction of child custody cases if one of the parents wants the child to receive gender-affirming medical care in Minnesota. It also provides general protections for providers and recipients of gender-affirming care in the state, in addition to prohibiting the enforcement of negative laws.

In cases of custody disputes crossing state lines, the court can establish a "temporary emergency jurisdiction" to resolve conflicts between parents who disagree on the child's gender-affirming care. The court will rule based on what is in the children's best interests, and does not have the authority to provide gender-affirming care if both parents object to it.

=== Misinformation ===
Various conservative commentators, including Megyn Kelly, falsely claimed that the law terminates parental rights, incorrectly suggesting that it allows Minnesota courts to restrict parents based on a parent's refusal to provide gender-affirming care. She also posted disinformation on X, formerly Twitter, stating that the law allows the state to take custody of the children if the parents object to gender affirming care.

== See also ==
- LGBTQ rights in Minnesota
