= Church of the Annunciation (Minneapolis) =

Catholic parish in Minnesota, US

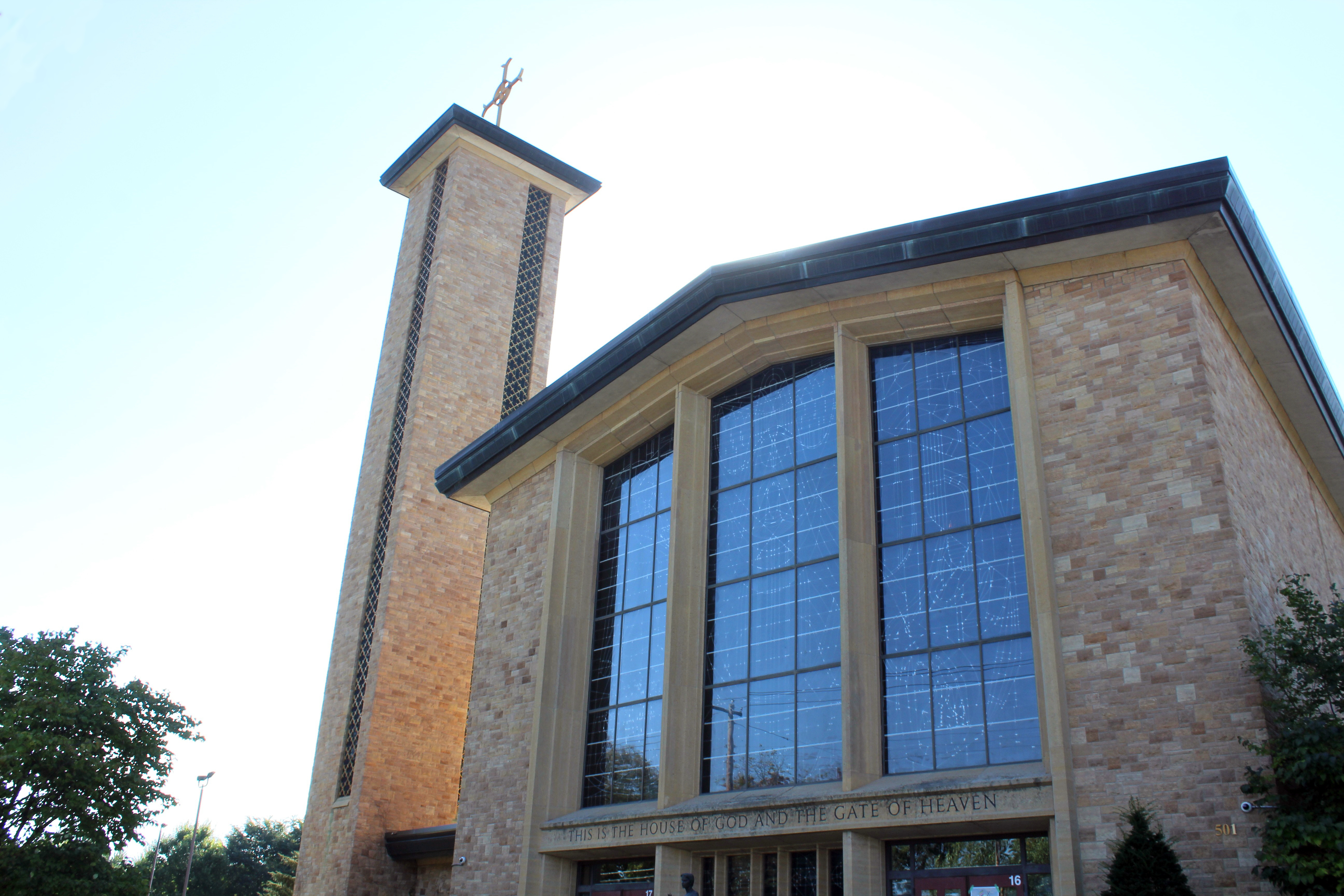
- Front of church facing 54th Street
- Church of the Annunciation
- 44°54′17″N 93°17′09″W
- Address: 509 54th St. West; Minneapolis, Minnesota
- Country: United States
- Denomination: Catholic Church
- Sui iuris church: Latin Church
- Website: annunciationmsp.org

History
- Founded: 1922
- Events: Annunciation Catholic Church shooting

Architecture
- Architect(s): Patch and Erickson
- Style: Modern
- Groundbreaking: June 4, 1961
- Completed: 1962
- Construction cost: $890,000 ($9.47 million in 2025)

Specifications
- Materials: Mankato-Kasota stone

Administration
- Archdiocese: Archdiocese of Saint Paul and Minneapolis

Clergy
- Pastor: Dennis Zehren

The Church of the Annunciation is a Catholic church located at 509 54th Street West in the Windom neighborhood of the city of Minneapolis, Minnesota, United States. It is a parish church of the Archdiocese of Saint Paul and Minneapolis.

The parish was established in 1922, with its first pastor, Francis J. Lang, celebrating Masses in several non-church structures until its first church building was constructed in 1925. The building included a convent, with the Sisters of St. Dominic having begun staffing a parochial school in 1923. A second church building completed in a modern style was opened in 1962. Visitation Parish merged with the Church of the Annunciation in 2013. A mass shooting in August 2025 targeted students and faculty of the Annunciation Catholic School as they attended a Mass in the church, killing two children and wounding over a dozen others.

== History ==
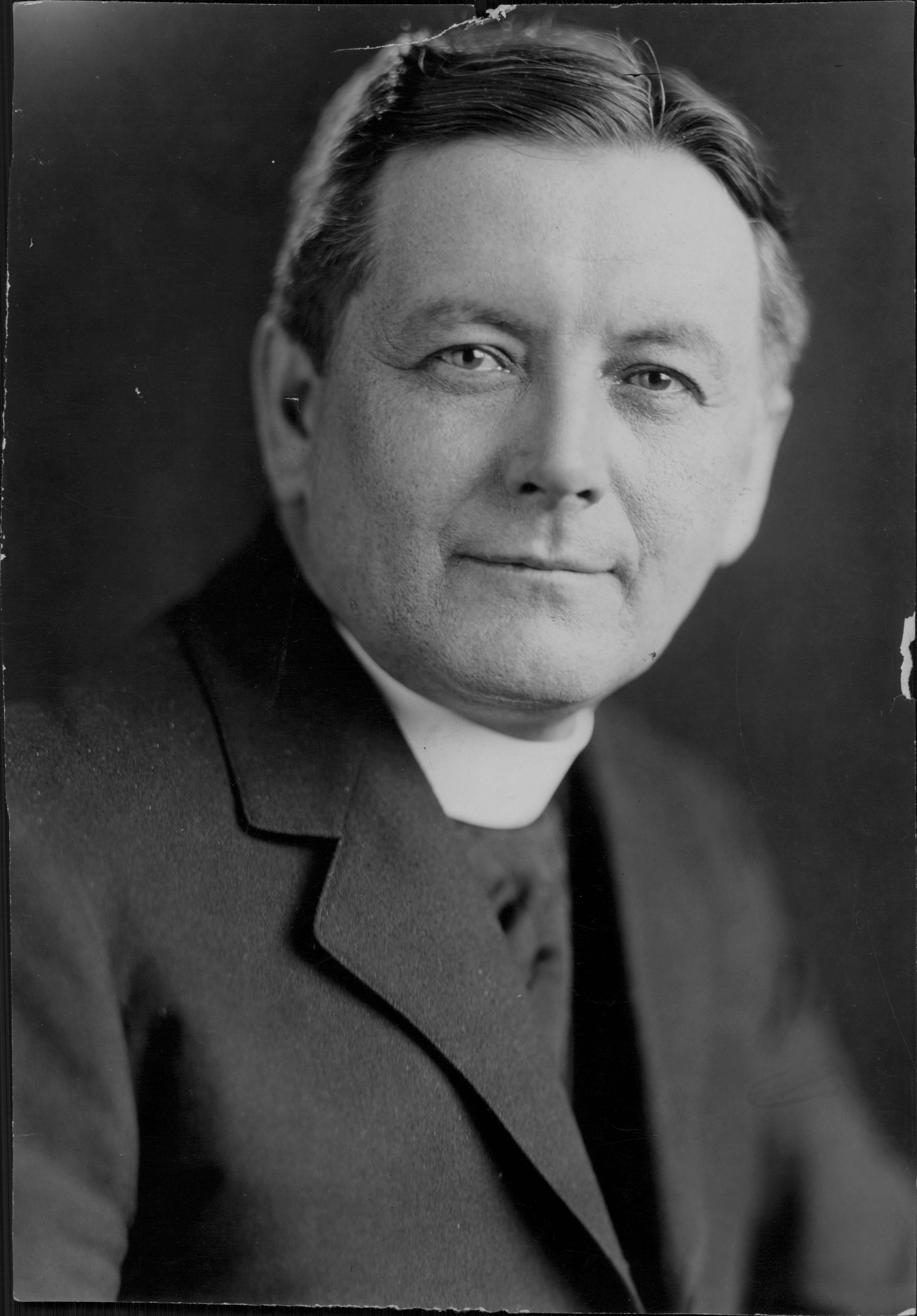
Francis J. Lang, founding pastor

The parish was established in 1922. The first Mass was celebrated October 1, 1922 at the Community House located at 4301 Pillsbury Avenue South. The parish then moved to a store at 54th and Garfield. A combination church, school and convent was built by the first pastor, F. J. Lang, and Masses moved to the new church October 18, 1925. A rectory was built, which was first occupied in December 1923.

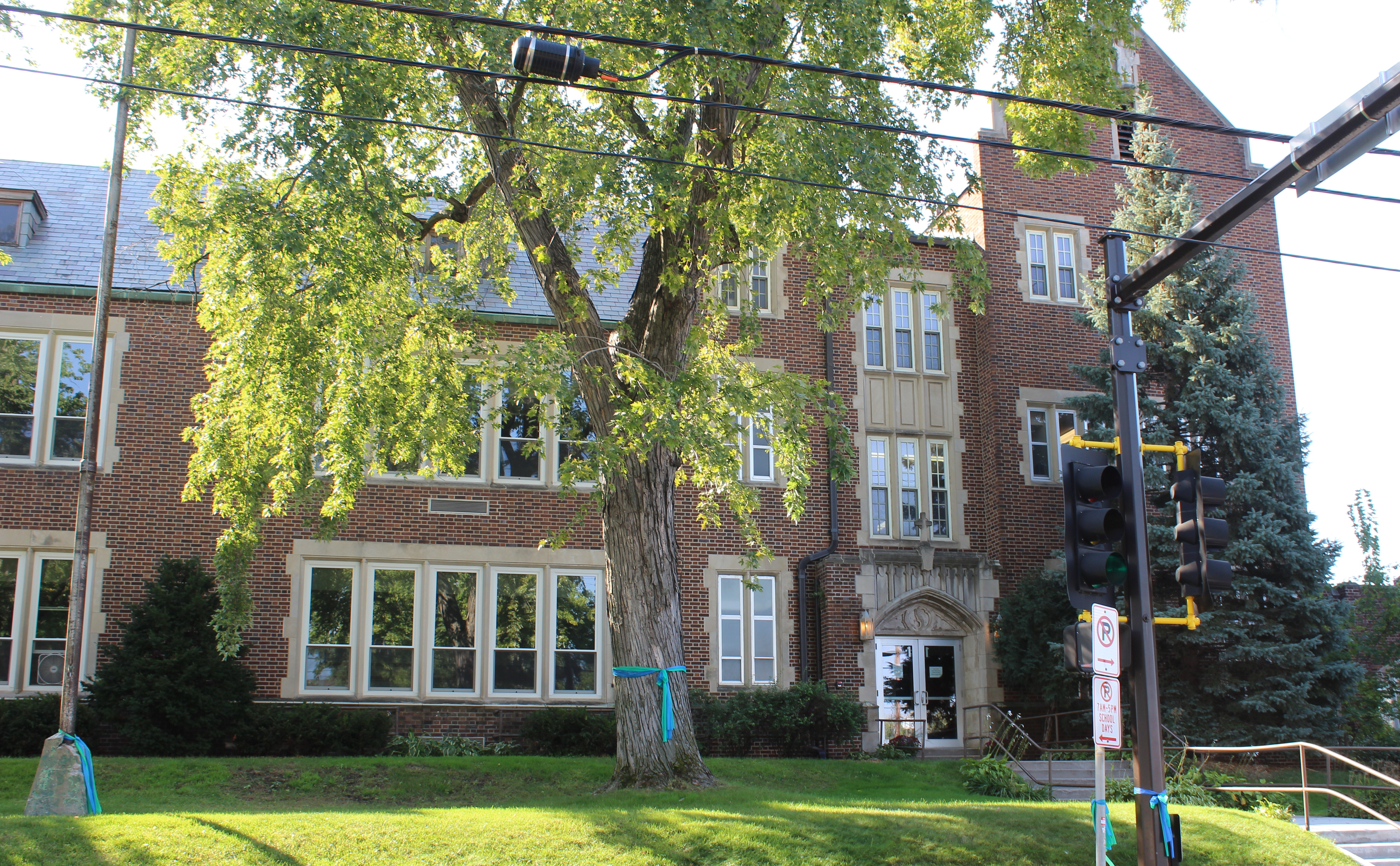
Annunciation Catholic School

The church first opened a parish school in September 1923, staffed by the Sisters of St. Dominic.

Lang remained pastor until 1945. J. A. Byrnes became pastor in 1945. He redecorated the church and remodeled its sanctuary in 1946. He also built a new convent in 1949.

Future bishop Paul Vincent Dudley was an assistant priest at the parish from 1951 to 1964. He would later become an auxiliary bishop of the Archdiocese of St. Paul and Minneapolis and then bishop of the Diocese of Sioux Falls, South Dakota. In 2002, Dudley voluntarily withdrew from public ministry after he was accused of having abused an altar server during his time at Annunciation. After an eight month investigation, the Archdiocese of St. Paul and Minneapolis said it had found no supporting evidence and archbishop Harry Flynn stated that he "now consider[ed] the complaints against Bishop Dudley to be closed and resolved in his favor." Dudley was returned to public ministry.

John Francis Kinney, a future auxiliary bishop of the archdiocese from 1976 to 1982, attended Annunciation's elementary school. He later served as Bishop of Bismarck and Bishop of Saint Cloud.

A new church was built in 1961 and 1962. Mass was first celebrated there December 16, 1962. Future bishop Richard Pates served as a weekend associate pastor at the parish from 1970 to 1974 while serving as vocations director for the archdiocese.

The parish merged with Visitation Parish in 2013. Effective July 1, 2025, Dennis Zehren became the church's pastor.

=== 2025 shooting ===
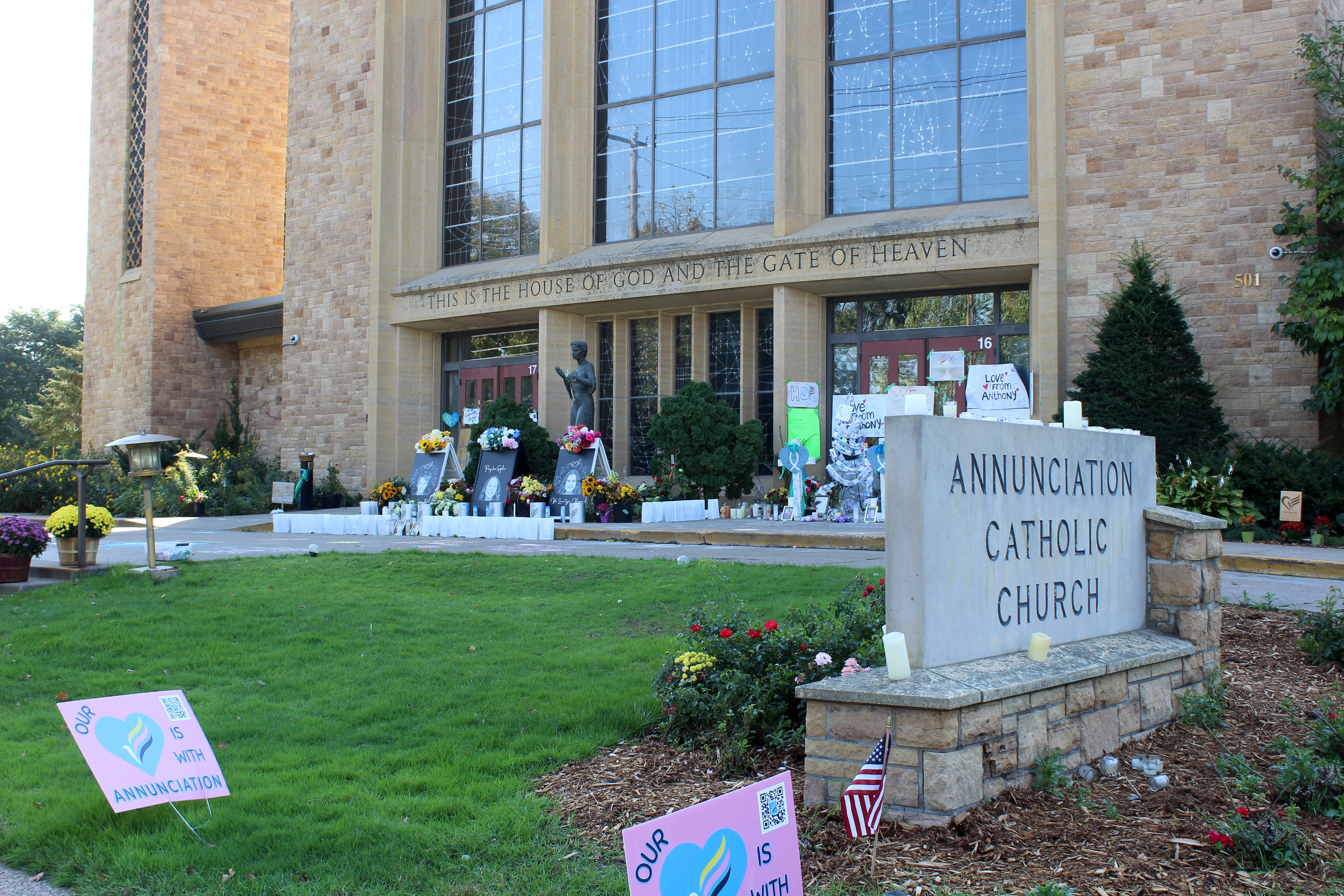
Memorials at church entrance

On the morning of August 27, 2025, a mass shooting occurred at the church. The attack took place during a scheduled school-wide Mass, attended by students and faculty of Annunciation Catholic School. Three people were killed: two children and the perpetrator. Seventeen others were injured, including 14 children.

On December 6, 2025, Archbishop Bernard Hebda presided over a Solemn Rite of Reparation at the church, reconsecrating the space for sacred worship. Media were asked not to be present inside for the ceremony.

== Architecture ==
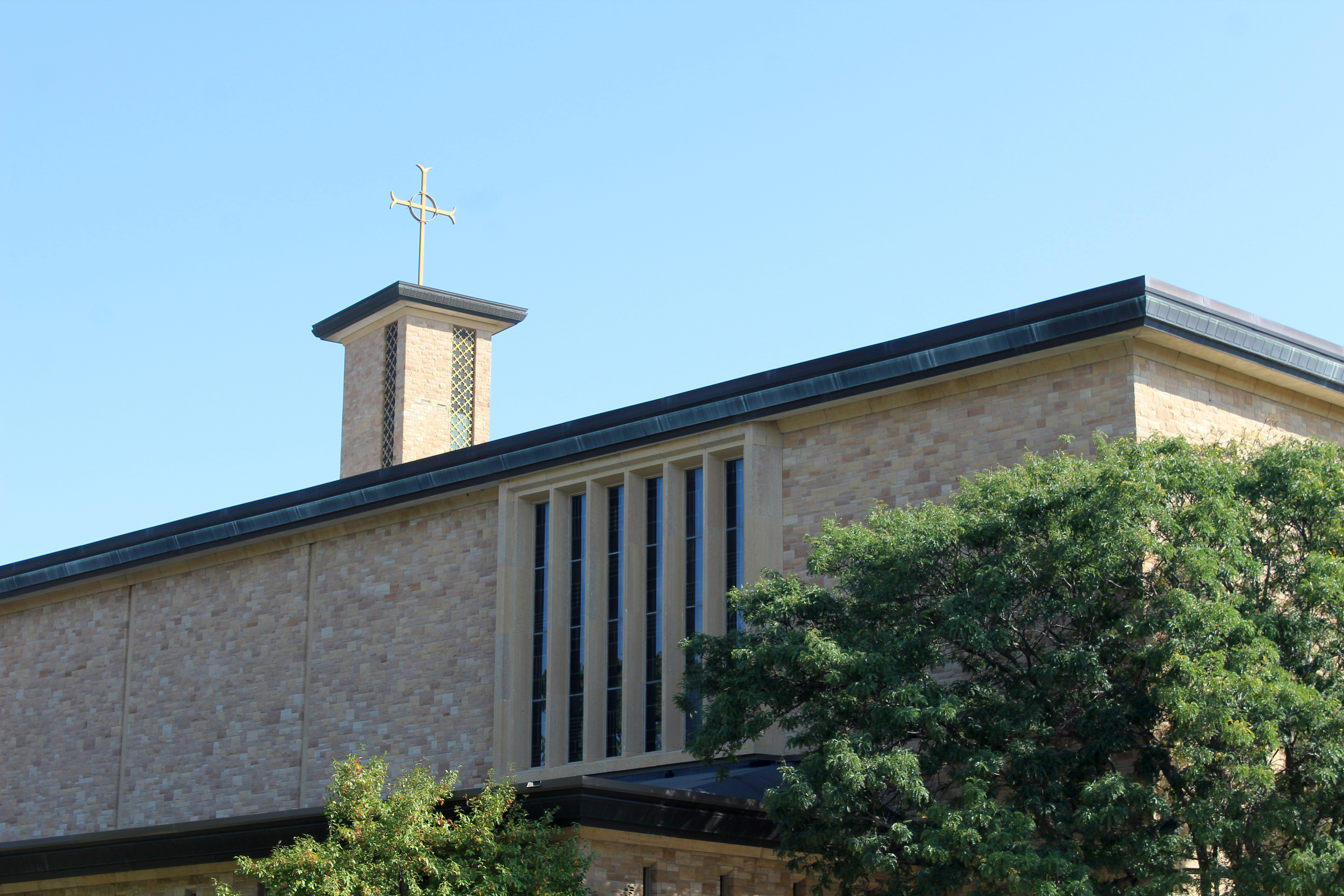
Roof profile

The present church was designed in a modern style by the firm Patch and Erickson, which had been founded by the architects Robert Patch (b. 1924) and Donald M. Erickson, who had by that time been joined by the additional principals John A. Madson and Robert D. Hanson.

Groundbreaking took place on June 4, 1961. Construction was completed by 1962 at a cost of $890,000 ($9.47 million in 2025). The building is constructed of Mankato-Kasota limestone. The church's shape is a high, oblong box, beneath a low-pitched roof. There are stained glass windows above the doors in the front facade. A tower "with the feel of an Italian campanile" and surmounted by a cross stands to the left of the church's front, somewhat separated from the main body of the church.

The church houses four bells, named after the evangelists Matthew, Mark, Luke and John.
