= Leigh Finke =

American politician

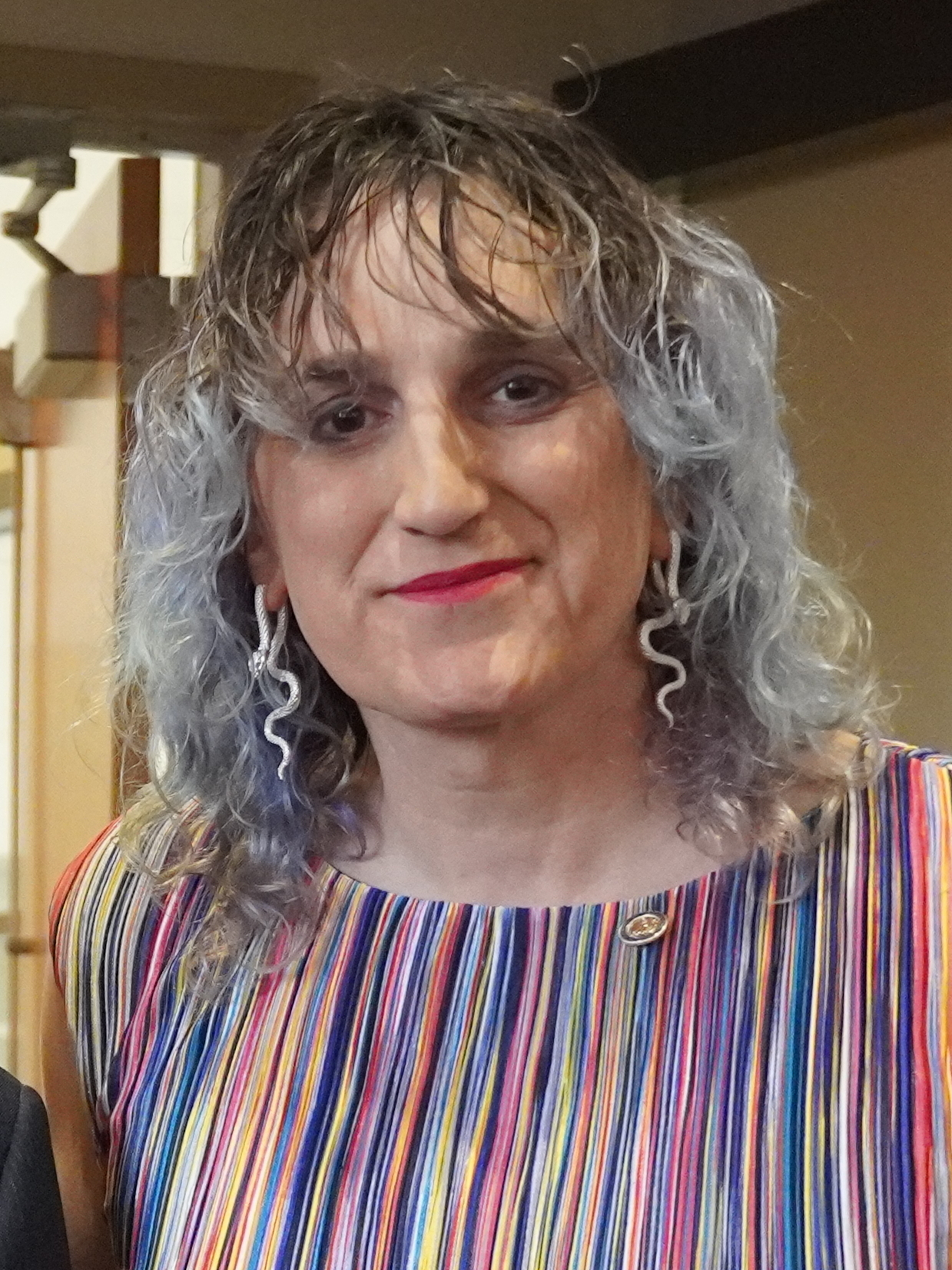
- Finke in 2023

Member of the Minnesota House of Representatives from the 66A district
- Incumbent
- Assumed office January 3, 2023
- Preceded by: Alice Hausman

Personal details
- Party: Democratic (DFL)
- Spouse: Deborah Fox
- Children: 2
- Education: Bethel University (BA); DePaul University (MA)
- Occupation: Media; Legislator
- Website: Government website Campaign website

Leigh Dawn Finke (/liː ˈfɪŋki/) is an American politician serving in the Minnesota House of Representatives since 2023. A member of the Minnesota Democratic-Farmer-Labor Party (DFL), Finke represents District 66A in the Twin Cities metropolitan area, which includes the cities of Falcon Heights, Lauderdale, Roseville and Saint Paul, and parts of Ramsey County in Minnesota. She is the first openly transgender member of the Minnesota Legislature.

== Early life, education, and career ==
Finke was born in Minnesota and grew up in the western suburbs of the Twin Cities, graduating from Maple Grove Senior High School in Maple Grove, Minnesota.

Finke earned a Bachelor of Arts degree in English literature in 2003 from Bethel College and a Master of Arts in Shakespeare from DePaul University. While at Bethel, she became active in politics protesting the Iraq War.

From 2018 to 2021, Finke was the senior producer at 1517 Media. There, she wrote and produced two documentary films: Ending the Silence: Confronting Sexual Shame in the Church and White Savior: Racism in the American Church. She also edited two nonfiction books for Beaming Books: Queerfully and Wonderfully Made and Welcoming and Affirming.

In 2021 and 2022, Finke worked as Multimedia Storyteller for the ACLU of Minnesota. In late 2022, she was publicly critical of Republican gubernatorial candidate Scott Jensen for spreading the transphobic litter boxes in schools hoax.

In March 2023, Finke started the Queer Equity Institute, a nonprofit that supports and encourages queer politicians.

== Minnesota House of Representatives ==
Finke was elected to the Minnesota House of Representatives in 2022. She first ran after legislative redistricting and the retirement of 17-term DFL incumbent Alice Hausman.

Finke is the first openly transgender legislator elected to the Minnesota Legislature. She said she was motivated to run because of anti-trans bills state Republicans introduced in 2021 that would make it a petty misdemeanor for transgender girls to participate in girls' sports. Finke was a founding member of and chairs the Queer Caucus, a group of LGBTQ+ legislators that formed before the 2023 legislative session.

Finke serves on the Environment and Natural Resources Finance and Policy, Human Services Policy, Judiciary Finance and Civil Law, and Legacy Finance Committees.

=== LGBTQ+ rights ===
Finke supported legislation to ban the use of the discredited practice of conversion therapy in the state for minors and vulnerable adults. She supported an Iowa school district's policy that required staff and students to use a student's preferred name and pronouns, saying: "We need to be supporting kids. We need to be including and recognizing them and believing them".

Finke sponsored legislation to remove language associating sexual orientation with pedophilia in state law and adding gender identity as a protected class in Minnesota's human rights statute. Republican representatives opposed the measure, some threatening to misgender Finke. Backlash led to Finke receiving death threats. Legal experts dismissed Republican claims that the bill would protect pedophiles, saying, "This doesn't create some sort of broad-based protection for those who prey on minors". She also wrote a bill that would repeal a law that criminalized knowingly exposing someone to HIV, calling them "old, outdated homophobic statutes".

In February 2026, Finke pushed back against a proposal for age verification checks on content for adults, such as porn sites. She argued the bill could be used to restrict access to educational content helpful for queer children in the absence of proper sex education about LGBTQ+ topics in schools. Several right-wing outlets, including The Daily Caller, misrepresented Finke's comments as suggesting that pornography is educational.

==== Trans refuge bill ====
Finke authored legislation that would protect people in the state and those traveling to Minnesota to receive gender-affirming care and has consistently opposed Republican efforts to ban transgender healthcare in the state. During a House floor debate on an amendment to ban transgender healthcare, Finke said: "You want to ban gender-affirming care for minors. What you want to do is you want to make sure minors never grow up to be me". She has also spoken about the need to remove barriers to access to healthcare, including by increasing health insurance coverage.

Finke sponsored an executive order protecting access to gender-affirming care for Minnesotans, which Governor Tim Walz signed on March 8, 2023. Her bill to protect access to gender-affirming care, the "Trans Refuge Bill", passed the House on March 24, 2023, after five hours of debate and was signed into law by Walz on April 27.

=== Other political positions ===
Finke is pro-choice and supports removing limitations on abortions in the state. She also supports increasing education funding, including raising teacher pay and increasing special education and mental health support.

In 2025, Finke proposed a bill requiring free water at ticketed events with over 100 attendees, in an effort to prevent heat-related injuries after an outdoor food festival in Minneapolis during a 2023 heat wave initially had no water available to the public.

== Awards and honors ==
- In 2023, Finke was named as one of USA Today's Women of the Year, which recognizes women who have made a significant impact across the country.
- She was highlighted by Minnesota Public Radio's "Changemakers" series, which showcases Minnesotans from diverse backgrounds making an impact in the state.
- Children's Minnesota awarded Finke the Children's Health Hero Award in 2023 for her work on the trans refuge bill.

== Personal life ==
Finke is the first openly transgender member of the Minnesota legislature.

She lives in St. Paul's Midway neighborhood and has two children. In August 2025, Finke married Deborah Marie Fox in a ceremony at the State Capitol Rotunda.

== Electoral history ==
2022 DFL primary - Minnesota State House - District 66A
Party	Candidate	Votes	%
Democratic (DFL)	Leigh Finke	4,034	63.17
Democratic (DFL)	Dave Thomas	2,352	36.83
Total votes		6,386	100%

2022 Minnesota State House - District 66A
Party	Candidate	Votes	%
Democratic (DFL)	Leigh Finke	15,635	81.14
Republican	Trace Johnson	3,569	18.52
Total votes		19,268	100%
Democratic (DFL) hold			

2024 Minnesota State House - District 66A
Party	Candidate	Votes	%
Democratic (DFL)	Leigh Finke (incumbent)	18,166	80.99
Republican	Fadil Jama	4,180	18.64
Write-in		84	0.37
Total votes		22,430	100.00
Democratic (DFL) hold			

== See also ==
- List of transgender public officeholders in the United States
