= Misinformation about violence by transgender people =

False claims about trans people committing violence

Mass shootings in the United States between January 1, 2013, and September 15, 2025, as reported by the Gun Violence Archive. Approximately 1% of the United States population over the age of 13 identify as transgender.
1. Shootings with a confirmed transgender or non-binary perpetrator: 5 (0.09%)
2. All other shootings: 5,743 (99.9%)

In the 2020s, right-wing politicians and commentators have falsely claimed that transgender people commit disproportionately higher rates of violence, such as mass shootings or terrorist attacks. Various hoaxes have also misidentified perpetrators of violent incidents as transgender. This misinformation is primarily generated and circulated within the United States, particularly on social media, but has also been noted in Canada. It has been amplified by Trumpist voices such as Donald Trump Jr., Libs of TikTok owner Chaya Raichik, and The Heritage Foundation, and has spread internationally through foreign outlets and figures, including RT in Russia.

Members of the second Trump administration have suggested policies on the basis of these claims, including for the Department of Justice to revoke trans people's right to possess firearms. The Heritage Foundation petitioned the FBI to designate "Transgender Ideology-Inspired Violent Extremism" as a domestic terrorism threat category. As of February 2026, neither policy has been enacted. Following the assassination of Charlie Kirk, Texas US representative Ronny Jackson called for trans people to be taken "off the streets".

According to Ohio State University professor of human security Laura Dugan, the threat of transgender shooters is "just not a concern," and transgender people are underrepresented as perpetrators of mass shootings. Analyses of the topic have noted that transgender people are substantially more likely to be victims than the perpetrators of violence. According to subject-matter experts, disinformation casting transgender people as violent is used to legitimize anti-trans violence and legislation, particularly as part of a broader anti-LGBTQ backlash in the United States.

== Disinformation ==
According to The Independent, there has been a "years-long effort by many within the MAGA movement to smear America's estimated 2.8 million trans people as exceptionally violent, unstable, and prone to perpetrating mass shootings". This may take the form of false or unverified claims of the perpetrators of violent events having transgender identities to spread on social media in the immediate aftermath of the events, or of misrepresentations of the overall trend of the rate at which trans people commit violence. This disinformation is primarily prevalent in the United States, though the CBC also noted the existence of disinformation coming from the Canadian political sphere.

=== Individual cases ===
An analysis by Wired found 12 violent events between 2022 and 2025 which were falsely blamed on trans people. In one example, Republican congressman Paul Gosar incorrectly claimed the 2022 Uvalde school shooting was perpetrated by a "transsexual leftist illegal alien". Right-wing social media accounts spread a hoax claiming that the perpetrator of the 2024 Abundant Life Christian School shooting was transgender. Chaya Raichik falsely claimed that the 2024 Lakewood Church shooting was "another act of trans terrorism". Conservative commentator Matt Wallace falsely blamed the 2025 Potomac River mid-air collision on Jo Ellis, saying it "may have been another trans terror attack", leading to her being harassed and suing Wallace for defamation.

Initial reports on the 2025 assassination of Charlie Kirk falsely claimed there was "transgender ideology" inscribed on the bullets used to kill Kirk. Prior to a motive or suspect being established, many assumed it to be motivated by Kirk's anti-LGBTQ views. Kirk spread misinformation about transgender-led gun violence, and was engaged in a debate about the topic when he was assassinated. Several right-wing individuals and groups, including The Oversight Project, a spin-off of the Heritage Foundation, attempted to link the shooting to the transgender rights movement through the suspected shooter's roommate, who is allegedly transgender, and had been assumed by the authorities to have been the suspect's romantic partner. There is no evidence the roommate was involved in or had any pre-knowledge of the assassination.

=== Overall trend ===
Conservative figures, including Donald Trump Jr. and Ronny Jackson, have falsely claimed that trans people commit disproportionately more violence than other groups, and disinformation around the rate at which they commit violence has spread in conservative media.

Numbers vary across study and methodology, depending on factors such as how such crimes are defined, but studies do not show a disproportionate rate of violence among transgender people. According to a 2024 analysis by the Poynter Institute, transgender people represent 0.1–1.5% of shooters in the US, and make up 0.5–1.6% of the population. Experts on gun violence agree that transgender people do not represent a disproportionate threat, and there is no evidence to suggest they are more likely to commit violent crimes than the general population. According to Ohio State University professor of human security Laura Dugan, the risk of transgender people committing shootings is "just not a concern", and transgender people are underrepresented as mass shooters. Dr. Ragy Girgis, a clinical psychology professor and expert in mass murder at Columbia University, said that being transgender is "not a causative factor in mass shootings". Mia Bloom, a professor at Georgia State University, noted that the group in the United States committing violence at a disproportionate rate was white, heterosexual men.

The Gun Violence Archive (GVA) defines a mass shooting as any incident which injured or killed at least four victims, excluding the shooter, and counted 5,748 mass shootings in the US between January 1, 2013, and September 15, 2025. According to GVA founder Mark Bryant, five (Note: These five include the Colorado Springs nightclub shooting, whose perpetrator Anderson Lee Aldrich, identified as non-binary during court proceedings. Aldrich's acquaintances have questioned the sincerity of this identity, citing the shooter's history of anti-LGBTQ beliefs. The other counted are the 2018 Aberdeen, Maryland shooting, the 2019 STEM School Highlands Ranch shooting, the 2023 Nashville school shooting, and the 2025 Annunciation Catholic Church shooting.) of these shootings (0.09%) involve a perpetrator confirmed to be transgender, with an additional three (0.05%) involving suspects with an unconfirmed gender identity. By comparison, approximately 1% of the United States population identifies as transgender.

The Violence Prevention Project at Hamline University more narrowly defines a mass shooting as an incident in which four victims excluding the shooter were killed in a public place, unrelated to gang violence or other criminal activity. Of 201 mass shootings it recorded in the US between 1966 and 2025, 196 were attributed to cisgender men (97.5%), (Note: Including the Colorado Springs shooting) 4 to cisgender women (2%), and only 1 (0.5%), the 2023 Nashville school shooting, to a transgender perpetrator.

== Spread ==
Transgender violence misinformation has largely been spread by figures associated with the MAGA movement. According to GLAAD, claims are often spread on social media in the immediate aftermath of events before full facts are available.

In August and September 2025, following the Annunciation Catholic School shooting, whose perpetrator at one point identified as transgender, charts went viral on the social media platform X which falsely claimed to show an increased rate of violence perpetrated by transgender people. The data on the charts was fabricated, with GVA founder Mark Bryant saying of the charts that, "I have no clue where their numbers come from but they are painfully inaccurate across the board."

On September 11, 2025, Donald Trump Jr. falsely claimed on The Megyn Kelly Show that the "radical trans movement" was more violent than al-Qaeda or the Taliban. In the same show, Megyn Kelly blamed "pro-transgender ideology" for the assassination of Charlie Kirk, saying, "That doesn't mean they are all murderous, but there is a particularly high percentage committing crimes these days, and it is responsible and important to say so."

Following the Tumbler Ridge shooting committed by a trans woman in February 2026, Canadian politician Tara Armstrong tweeted that there was an "epidemic of transgender violence". Former Canadian opposition leader Stockwell Day, as well as Elon Musk and RT also suggested that the shooter's gender identity was notable. Other Canadian politicians and violence experts condemned these statements, including Kasari Govender, the human rights commissioner of British Columbia, who responded in a statement, "Using this horrific incident to conflate trans identities with violent tendencies is incorrect, irresponsible and frankly dangerous." In the wake of the shooting, numerous posts and news sources showed photos of an unrelated trans woman from Ontario, misidentifying her as the shooter.

On September 23, 2026, senator from Alabama and state governor candidate Tommy Tuberville claimed without evidence that the Charlie Kirk assassination, the attempted assassination of Donald Trump, and the 2023 Nashville shooting had ties to trans ideology and the furry community.

=== Policy ===
Right-wing politicians in the United States have repeated misinformation about transgender violence, and suggested policy changes on the basis of that misinformation. Following the Annunciation Catholic School shooting, the United States Department of Justice considered enacting policies to ban transgender people from owning guns based on the smear that transgender people are more prone to perpetrate mass shootings. One unnamed Justice Department official was quoted as saying: "We're not playing semantics with words like dysphoria. We're talking about trannies, and we don't think they should have guns." This initial proposal was criticized by gun rights organizations, including the National Rifle Association of America, Gun Owners of America, the National Association for Gun Rights, and the Second Amendment Foundation.

On September 18, 2025, Texas Republican congressman Ronny Jackson stated on a radio show hosted by Rob Finnerty that trans people "have an underlying level of aggressiveness", and based on this called trans people a "virus", suggesting: "We have to get [trans people] off the streets and we have to get them off the internet. We can't let them communicate with each other." In September 2025, The Heritage Foundation launched a petition to have "violent transgender ideology" categorized as a domestic terror threat in the United States. That same month, sources reported that the Federal Bureau of Investigation was preparing to classify certain transgender offenders as a "nihilistic violent extremist" threat group. A Wired investigation examined a claim used by The Heritage Foundation in its policy recommendation that half of all non-gang-related school shootings from 2015 to 2025 involved "transgender ideology", and found it to be false, saying the claim was "misleading by design, arbitrary in scope, and unscientific at its core".

In December 2025, Attorney General Pam Bondi instructed the FBI to begin offering cash bounties for information leading to the identification and arrest of transgender activists promoting what she referred to as "radical gender ideology", and described such activists as "domestic terrorist groups", which Pink News writer Amelia Hansford connected to previous statements the Trump administration had made about investigating "transgender violence".

== Reactions ==
Subject-matter experts, including Yotam Ophir, a University of Buffalo professor specializing in gun violence, and Ari Drennen, a program director for Media Matters, noted that transgender violence disinformation could be used to justify anti-trans legislation and violence against trans people. According to Ophir: "If you persuade conservatives that LGBTQ people are inherently flawed, that they are violent, that they are a risk to society, then any legislation against them will be justified... Every act of violence against them will be justified." According to GLAAD, the accusations aim to "dehumanize, demonize, and promote fear about transgender and nonbinary people". Analyses of the subject have noted that trans people are far more likely to be the victims of violence than the perpetrators of it.

== See also ==
- Anti-LGBTQ rhetoric
- Drag panic
- Lavender Scare – a moral panic about homosexual people in the United States government
- Transgender health care misinformation
- Transphobia
  - Transphobia in the United States
- 2020s anti-LGBTQ movement in the United States
