= Angela Ferrell-Zabala =

American activist

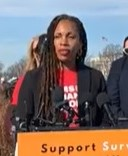
- Ferrell-Zabala in 2023
- Occupations: Community organizer; political activist; nonprofit executive
- Employer: Moms Demand Action
- Title: Executive Director of Moms Demand Action (2023–present)
- Spouse: Fernanda Ferrell-Zabala

Angela Ferrell-Zabala is an American reproductive rights, gun control, and social justice activist who serves as the inaugural executive director of Moms Demand Action.

== Career ==
Ferrell-Zabala's early career included community organizing positions at several social justice organizations, with a focus on outreach to faith communities. In 2011–12, she was the director of the Religious Coalition for Reproductive Choice's Spiritual Youth for Reproductive Freedom project, conducting reproductive rights outreach on college campuses. Ferrell-Zabala was also an organizer for Community Change, and the Community Voting Project.

In 2014, Ferrell-Zabala joined Planned Parenthood as Director of African American Leadership and Engagement. She was subsequently appointed the National Director of Strategic Partnerships for the Planned Parenthood Action Fund.

Ferrell-Zabala joined Everytown for Gun Safety, Moms Demand Action's parent organization, in 2019 as Chief Equity, Outreach and Partnerships Officer. After serving in the role for 18 months, she was appointed Senior Vice President of Movement Building for Everytown. Ferrell-Zabala was appointed the Moms Demand Action's first executive director on April 27, 2023.

== Personal life ==
Ferrell-Zabala identifies as Christian and LGBT. Ferrell-Zabala and her wife, Fernanda Ferrell-Zabala live in Washington, D.C., with their four children. In 2022, she shared in a New York Times profile about LGBT families that she had befriended SumOfUs Executive Director Emma Ruby-Sachs at a nonprofit leadership retreat in 2016, only to later discover their daughters were half-siblings, having used the same sperm donor.
