= Jo Ellis (pilot) =

Virginia National Guard pilot

- Born: 1990 or 1991 (age 35–36)

Jo Ellis is a Black Hawk pilot and member of the Virginia National Guard. In the aftermath of the January 2025 Potomac River mid-air collision she was mistakenly identified by a user on Twitter as the helicopter's pilot in a post viewed nearly 5 million times within the next six months. The accusation and its fallout have been connected to other similar incidents blaming trans people for prominent violent incidents.

== Early life ==
Ellis grew up in a conservative religious home. She was primarily home schooled. Her family has a history of military service; she has said James O. Ellis is a cousin, a great uncle served at the Battle of the Bulge, a grandfather served in the Navy during World War II, and a brother served in the Army as a tank operator. She has said she had gender dysphoria from the age of five.

== Military career ==
Ellis joined the Virginia national guard in 2009 as a helicopter mechanic. She was deployed to Iraq in 2011, serving as a door gunner, to Guatemala in 2014, and to Kuwait in 2016. In 2020 she became a Black Hawk pilot. As of 2025 she is a Chief Warrant Officer 2.

In 2023 Ellis notified her command that she was beginning gender transition. She funded her own medical expenses, and came out to her unit in 2024.

In June 2025, as the deadline for the Trump administration executive order for transgender troops to leave service voluntarily approached, Ellis said she would "exhaust all options" to remain in the military as long as she could, and if forced out and invited back, would be "up for it because I know it's not the Virginia National Guard doing this to me". As of October 2025 she was being processed out. On October 17, talk show host Michael Smerconish asked South Carolina congresswoman Nancy Mace about Ellis's case. Mace became angry and hung up on Smerconish after calling Ellis a "guy in a dress".

== Collision misidentification ==
In January 2025, after the 2025 Potomac River mid-air collision, Ellis was misidentified by a prominent user, whom USA Today termed a "right-wing influencer" on Twitter as the pilot; the post went viral, becoming the second highest trending topic on Twitter, and by July 2025 the user's original post getting nearly 5 million views. The account owner, connecting the collision to a piece Ellis had written about being trans and in the military, wrote that Ellis had "a long letter about ‘Gender Dysphoria’ and depression 1 day before the fatal crash!" and called it a "trans terror attack". Chatbot Grok also named Ellis as the responsible pilot. Ellis became the second-highest trending topic on Twitter. Ellis released a proof of life video. She received death threats. She was often recognized by strangers in public places. She began carrying a gun at all times. She and her family moved temporarily to a different location.

In April 2025, represented by the Equality Legal Action Fund, Ellis sued the owner of the Twitter account in the US District Court in Colorado, arguing the owner had "concocted a destructive and irresponsible defamation campaign” in order to monetize social media. In September 2025 a federal judge refused to dismiss the defamation complaint.

NPR, NBC, and Wired connected the misidentification to what Wired termed a "rising trend on the conservative internet: right-wing accounts blaming transgender people for a national tragedy or a violent incident". The New York Times called the blaming of Ellis "a sign, in the eyes of the online mob, that diversity initiatives had played a role in the crash", noting that Trump had connected the crash to diversity initiatives in the military under the Biden and Obama administrations.

== Kill Tony ==
Ellis appeared in an episode of Kill Tony, in which she performed standup and did an interview with Tony Hinchcliffe. She described it as a way of reaching out to a broader audience to tell her story.

== Personal life ==
Ellis is a trans woman. She has described herself as a political moderate. She married and had a stepdaughter. In the private sector she works in information technology.

== See also ==
- Persecution of transgender people under the second Trump administration

== Bibliography ==
- "Living to Serve, Living as Myself: A Transgender Service Member's Perspective". Smerconish. 28 January 2025.
