= Varian v. Einhorn =

Lawsuit

- Court: New York Supreme Court
- Full case name: Fox Varian v. Kenneth Einhorn PhD et al
- Decided: January 30, 2026

Court membership
- Judge sitting: Robert S. Ondrovic

Keywords
- medical malpractice; detransition

Varian v. Einhorn was a New York lawsuit best known for being the first case of a detransitioner going to trial and winning a medical malpractice suit in the United States. Varian was awarded $2 million in her case against her psychologist and surgeon.

== Background ==
According to court documents, Fox Varian was a "troubled adolescent grappling with a welter of mental health issues, including depression, anxiety, social phobia and an eating disorder." At the age of 14, she was diagnosed as being on the autism spectrum.

At the age of 15, Varian began identifying as transgender and changed her name to Rowan. At around this time, she also began to express an interest in pursuing gender-affirming medical care to her psychologist, Dr. Kenneth Einhorn, whom she had been seeing for more than two years, but had no formal training in treating transgender patients. Einhorn had originally recommended Varian try hormone replacement therapy, but Varian had insisted on surgery.

Nine months after she began expressing a desire to medically transition, Einhorn referred her to a plastic surgeon, Dr. Simon Chin. At the age of 16 in 2019, Varian underwent a double mastectomy as masculinizing surgery. She later detransitioned.

== Lawsuit ==
In 2023, Varian sued her psychologist Kenneth Einhorn and surgeon Simon Chin, alleging that they "had rushed her into the surgery, had not addressed her mental health issues, and had not obtained informed consent."

=== Trial ===
The trial took place in White Plains, New York and lasted 3 weeks.

Both parties in the case stressed that the case was not about whether gender-affirming care itself is medical malpractice or whether gender-affirming surgery was appropriate for minors. The jury was also not asked to decide the legitimacy of such care. Rather, the lawsuit and trial narrowly focused on whether Einhorn and Chin had followed the accepted guidelines for such care while treating Varian specifically.

Varian's attorney, Adam Deutsch argued that Einhorn and Chin "just didn't have the experience to deal with someone questioning their gender identity" and had not adequately communicated with each other prior to the surgery, specifically during the referral process. Deutsch additionally accused Einhorn of saying Varian had been diagnosed with body dysmorphia rather than gender dysphoria when referring her to Chin. According to reporters, this inaccurate recording of her diagnosis was "an error that proved pivotal in the jury's decision".

Dr. Loren Schechter, the president-elect of the World Professional Association for Transgender Health (WPATH) testified in favor of Varian at the trial, saying that Einhorn and Chin had failed to follow WPATH's Standards of Care for the Health of Transgender and Gender Diverse People, which supports gender-affirming care, including surgeries for minors on a case-by-case basis. Schechter said that he believed the decision to approve the surgery in this particular case was based on "assumption and inference."

=== Verdict ===
On January 30, 2026, a jury awarded Varian $2 million in damages, consisting of $1.6 million for past and future pain and suffering and $400,000 for future medical expenses.

== Reception ==
Following the trial, Varian's attorney, Adam Deutsch sought to downplay the significance of the verdict stating "This was never a debate over the legitimacy of gender-affirming care... It was about whether medical professionals met the standards that covered their own profession."

Charles LiMandri, a lawyer representing Chloe Cole, a detransition activist who opposes gender-affirming for minors, said that Varian's case suggested that juries may be sympathetic to plaintiff who claim they were not fully informed about gender-affirming care, even if they had consented to it.

Following the verdict, WPATH emphasized in a statement that the case was about healthcare providers not following their organization's Standards of Care for performing gender-affirming surgery on minors and was not a referendum on transgender healthcare itself, adding that "when care is delivered ethically and responsibly within [our] guidelines, the integrity of the field is strengthened."

In the wake of the verdict, the American Society of Plastic Surgeons (ASPS) issued a position statement containing a blanket recommendation against gender transition surgery for patients under the age of 19. WPATH criticized the ASPS's position statement, saying that there is "no definitive age or one-size-fits-all approach for every patient" and emphasized that care should be delivered in case-by-case assessments rather than blanket opposition.

== See also ==
- Bell v Tavistock
- Chloe Cole
