= Detrans (film) =

2023 short film by PragerU

Detrans: The Dangers of Gender-Affirming Care
- Produced by: PragerU
- Starring: Chloe Cole; Prisha Mosely; Camille Kiefe; Harmeet Dhillon; Leor Sapir
- Distributed by: PragerU
- Release date: 2023
- Running time: 21 minutes
- Country: United States
- Language: English

Detrans: The Dangers of Gender-Affirming Care is a 2023 documentary short film produced and distributed by PragerU, an American conservative advocacy group. The film centers on interviews of two adults who once identified as transgender, but later reverted to identify with the sex they were assigned at birth.

== Plot ==
Detrans tells the stories of Daisy Strongin and Abel Garcia, two individuals who transitioned and later detransitioned after deciding they were not transgender. It also includes Leor Sapir, a Manhattan Institute for Policy Research fellow, as well as attorney Harmeet Dhillon, who has brought cases against health care providers who perform gender-affirming surgery, representing individuals who chose to undergo surgery when they were under the age of 18. In less detail, the film also showcases Chloe Cole, Prisha Mosely, and Camille Kiefel, all of whom have detransitioned and now advocate against the rights of transgender people.

The film claims that the individuals interviewed were "manipulated by the trans movement". It also criticizes the practice of providing gender-affirming care to minors, though Strongin and Garcia were legal adults when they began medically transitioning.

There are also brief statements from Oli London, Elle Palmer, and Laura Becker.

== Advertising campaign ==
Detrans was released as part of a US$1 million campaign and advertised on X (formerly Twitter) as part of a "timeline takeover", which showed a single ad to all users promoting the hashtag "#DETRANS". Users were not able to mute or block the hashtag, and PragerU's advertisements were "the first one displayed for most users of the social media platform throughout the day". PragerU has stated they chose to advertise on X because it is "one of the least censored social media platforms".

PragerU also stated that YouTube rejected their application to advertise the film there "almost immediately upon submission". A YouTube spokesperson clarified that the ads were prevented from appearing in users' home feeds due to a policy enacted in 2021 that restricted political ads from appearing there, (Note: This policy was later rescinded, and as of June 2025 does not appear on YouTube's advertising policy page.) and noted that PragerU's other ads promoting the film "do not violate [Youtube's] ads policies and are currently running across [its] platforms."

== Reception ==
Detrans was panned by LGBTQ groups, and has been described as "propaganda" by the Human Rights Campaign's president Kelley Robinson:

"Gender affirming care is safe, medically necessary, backed by decades of research, and supported by every major medical association. So-called documentaries like the one peddled by PragerU do nothing more than spread misinformation and stigmatize transgender people. Given the growing threats of violence faced by the transgender community, offering a platform to this type of hate-filled propaganda is not just immoral–it's dangerous. Today's timeline takeover is another stain on the platform."

In a piece for HuffPost, Ian Kumamoto expresses a similar sentiment, referring to the film as "fear-mongering" and "pure anti-trans propaganda", and calls the advertising campaign "a massive misinformation campaign." Of the people featured in the documentary, he says that "while their stories are valid — and definitely involve some instances of medical neglect — there’s no nuance or context provided, and it’s clear that the documentary’s aim is to make it seem like all kids are endangered by trans acceptance." Kumamoto's piece publicizes email correspondences between himself and PragerU staff, including one interaction where a press representative did not give any names in reply to a question about which individuals produced and directed the documentary, and another interaction where a spokesperson told him that the organization had put resources into promoting DeTrans in order "to reach a massive audience on the dangers of gender affirming care", which the spokesperson then called a "social contagion". Kumamoto also says that the documentary includes "very few expert sources" and that Dhillon is "hardly an objective source" and refers to Oli London's inclusion in the documentary as a "gag".

For Truthout, journalist Erin Reed writes, "The story of Daisy's platforming to attack transgender people has many echoes of the ex-gay movement of the 1990s and early 2000s... a focus on being broken, a search for religious redemption, a framing of LGBTQ+ identities as a 'choice' or something people are coerced into, and a story of being 'healed.'"

In response to the short film, James Factora wrote in Them: "As PragerU shows, [...] the right-wing isn't as concerned with facts as they are about feelings, to borrow a turn of phrase" and went on to cite a study in the medical journal Pediatrics, that found only 2.5% of trans participants detransitioned after 5 years.

An Advocate article reported that the film included content from at least one transgender social media influencer who did not consent to its inclusion and did not find out that she appeared in the film until it had already been released. This "led to an uptick in hateful messages" directed toward her.

In response to PragerU's timeline takeover, which promoted their film to all users on the platform using the hashtag "#DETRANS", Twitter users expressed frustration that they could not block or mute the hashtag. Some users attempted to take over the tag, flooding it with unrelated tweets as well as affirmative, counter-narrative stories about trans people.

PragerU has stated that the short film was rejected by multiple film festivals.

== See also ==
- 2020s anti-LGBTQ movement in the United States
- Anti-gender movement
- Gender-affirming hormone therapy
- Transgender health care
- Transgender health care misinformation
- Transphobia in the United States
- Transgender youth
