= Ky Schevers =

American transgender rights activist

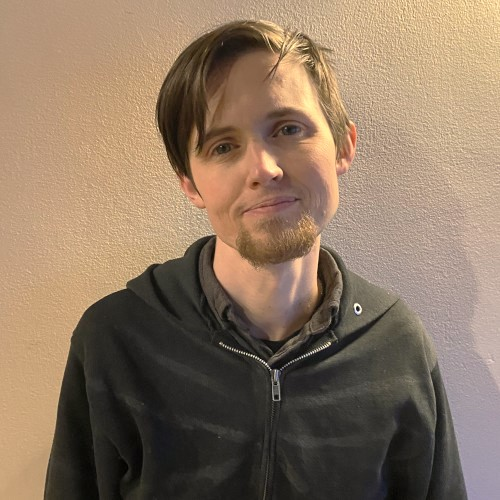
- Schevers in 2023
- Born: 1985 or 1986 (age 40–41)
- Other names: Crash, CrashChaosCats
- Occupation: Transgender rights activist
- Years active: 2013-present
- Known for: gender transition, detransition, retransition
- Website: healthliberationnow.com

Ky Schevers (/kaɪ ˈskiːvərz/) is an American transgender rights activist. She (Note: "Pronouns: She, her, hers") was assigned female at birth, but gradually transitioned to male, including medical transition at the age of 20. Five years after, she detransitioned to female. She became prominent among the detransitioned community and for writing and making online videos about the gender transition and detransition process under the pen names Crash or CrashChaosCats. Another nine years after detransitioning, Schevers broke with the detransitioned community over its attacks on gender transition in general, and began to retransition. She now identifies as transmasculine and genderqueer, but using feminine pronouns, and she co-leads "Health Liberation Now!", an organization defending transgender rights.

== Early life ==
Ky Schevers was born in 1985 or 1986. She was assigned female at birth and grew up in a Chicago suburb. In an interview with Outline, she described liking reptiles and science fiction as a child; most of her friends were boys. When her family moved to a more rural area when she was nine, she was ostracized or even severely bullied for not acting like a typical girl. In the same interview, puberty was described as "miserable" for her. At the age of 15, she realized she preferred girls romantically and joined the gay youth group at her Unitarian church. She cut her hair short, and started referring to herself as a "boy dyke". Around this time, she adopted a masculine name.

== Transition ==
By college, in 2004, Schevers was identifying as a trans man. Her college community was highly supportive of her transition, respecting her name and inquiring about accommodations she needed. Rather than the ostracism she had previously experienced, her transgender status got her positive attention as a "minor campus celebrity"; at the same time, she felt tokenized by her peers. Following her mother's death by suicide in Schevers's sophomore year, Schevers dropped out of college, and began the medical transition to male. She worked odd jobs to support herself and pay for the testosterone-based masculinizing hormone therapy, which was also subsidized by grants received by her Chicago clinic.

Over the following years, Schevers felt ambivalence about her transition. It solved some of her problems with her identity, but caused others. She says people were nicer to her after she transitioned, when she presented as a man, rather than a butch lesbian. However, testosterone led her to feel emotionally numb, and her previous obsessive thoughts about her gender and identity had not been resolved. She stopped taking testosterone after two years, then returned to a lower dose, then stopped again, though still described herself as trans. She began describing herself as genderqueer. Around this time, she began talking to an older woman who had detransitioned; the two bonded over their shared experiences of transition, queerness, and conflicted feelings over gender.

== Detransition ==
In the summer of 2011, Schevers began her detransition, from male back to female. She was more afraid of the detransition process than of the transition, but she was accepted by her friends and family. Meditation, physical work on a friend's farm, and writing about the process online helped. She blogged and made online videos as Crash and CrashChaosCats from 2013 to early 2020, about her transition and detransition. She wrote that her gender dysphoria that caused her initial transition was caused by her internalized misogyny and trauma, and she suggested that could also be true of other gender transitioners.

In 2014 and 2015, Schevers led workshops on detransitioning at the Michigan Womyn's Music Festival, where most of the audience were trans-exclusionary radical feminists. In the summer of 2016, she attended what she believed to be the first in-person gathering of detransitioned women, with sixteen participants on the West Coast. Writing as Crash, Schevers contributed multiple articles to the 2015 detransitioned women's zine Blood and Visions: Womyn Reconciling With Being Female, and a chapter to the 2016 radical feminist anthology Female Erasure: What You Need To Know About Gender Politics' War on Women, the Female Sex and Human Rights (ISBN 978-0-9971467-2-1), among 48 authors, many of whom considered gender transition an attack on women.

Conservatives retold Schevers's story. When, in November 2016, Schevers posted her first online video about her detransition, as CrashChaosCats, it was quickly picked up by American conservative blogger Robert Stacy McCain who used it as evidence of "her former captivity within the transgender cult." Breitbart took her story and likened transition to mutilation. In 2017, the Illinois Family Institute and LifeSiteNews wrote about her transition, calling it tragic, and implying it was only a response to trauma. Schevers said her words were misused and taken out of context.

Conservative commentator Ryan T. Anderson discussed Schevers, under the name Crash, at length in his 2018 book, When Harry Became Sally: Responding to the Transgender Moment. Anderson quotes her writing and videos to say that she was never a man trapped in a woman's body, instead that she wanted to identify as one because of personal trauma and a misogynistic culture, and that detransition brought her a more lasting peace. When Schevers found this out, she wrote that she was enraged to find out that her story was distorted and used this way, and that she would never have agreed had she been asked.

== Retransition ==
In late 2020, Keira Bell, a detransitioned woman in the UK, sued the UK National Health Service in the case Bell v Tavistock, causing the High Court of Justice to rule that young people, even with the help of their parents or doctors, could not give informed consent to transgender medical treatment. That ruling prompted Schevers to publicly break with and criticize the anti-transgender movement, despite having been considered one of its prominent figures. She said that it did not make sense to restrict people's access to transgender care just because some of them would later end up detransitioning.

Schevers said that even though there is nothing wrong with detransitioning itself, she called the communities associated with the anti-transgender movement "cult-like", and compared them to conversion therapy and the ex-gay movement, both discredited, in the ways that they each urged their subjects to treat their sexual or gender identities as delusions to work through and overcome, only to later admit that they still struggled with them. That was what happened to her, she said; she tried to explain her gender dysphoria "in a radical feminist framework, and find the root causes, and do everything to make these feelings go away, and that didn't really work. The only thing that did work to make them go away was accepting them." Slate magazine called her the most prominent of the former members of the anti-transgender movement who were speaking out against it.

In January 2021, Schevers and her partner Lee Leveille launched the organization "Health Liberation Now!" in response to the Bell v Tavistock ruling. Both had been involved with what they now called transphobic detransition communities and wanted to fight back against them. Schevers and Health Liberation Now became known for tracking anti-trans protests outside gender affirming clinics, and have been interviewed about other transgender issues.

In 2022, Schevers said she had "retransitioned", identifying herself as transmasculine and genderqueer, even though she still used she and her pronouns. She said that she supported the journey of trans and genderqueer youth, and felt guilty that she was a prominent figure who set the stage for other detransitioners who associated with far right groups to push an anti-trans platform to attack them.
