= John Pilley =

- Born: 1951 or 1952 (age 74–75)
- Known for: First prisoner in England and Wales to be granted sex reassignment surgery

John Pilley, also known as Jane Anne Pilley, became the first prisoner in England and Wales to be granted a gender-affirming surgery in 1999, following legal action. Pilley's case set a precedent for other transgender prisoners. At the time, he identified as a transgender woman and was serving a life sentence for kidnapping a taxi driver in 1981. He was in his seventh year of taking hormone-replacement treatment at the time of the surgery.

In 2006, he detransitioned and was moved back to a men's prison.
