= Chloe Cole =

American activist (born 2004)

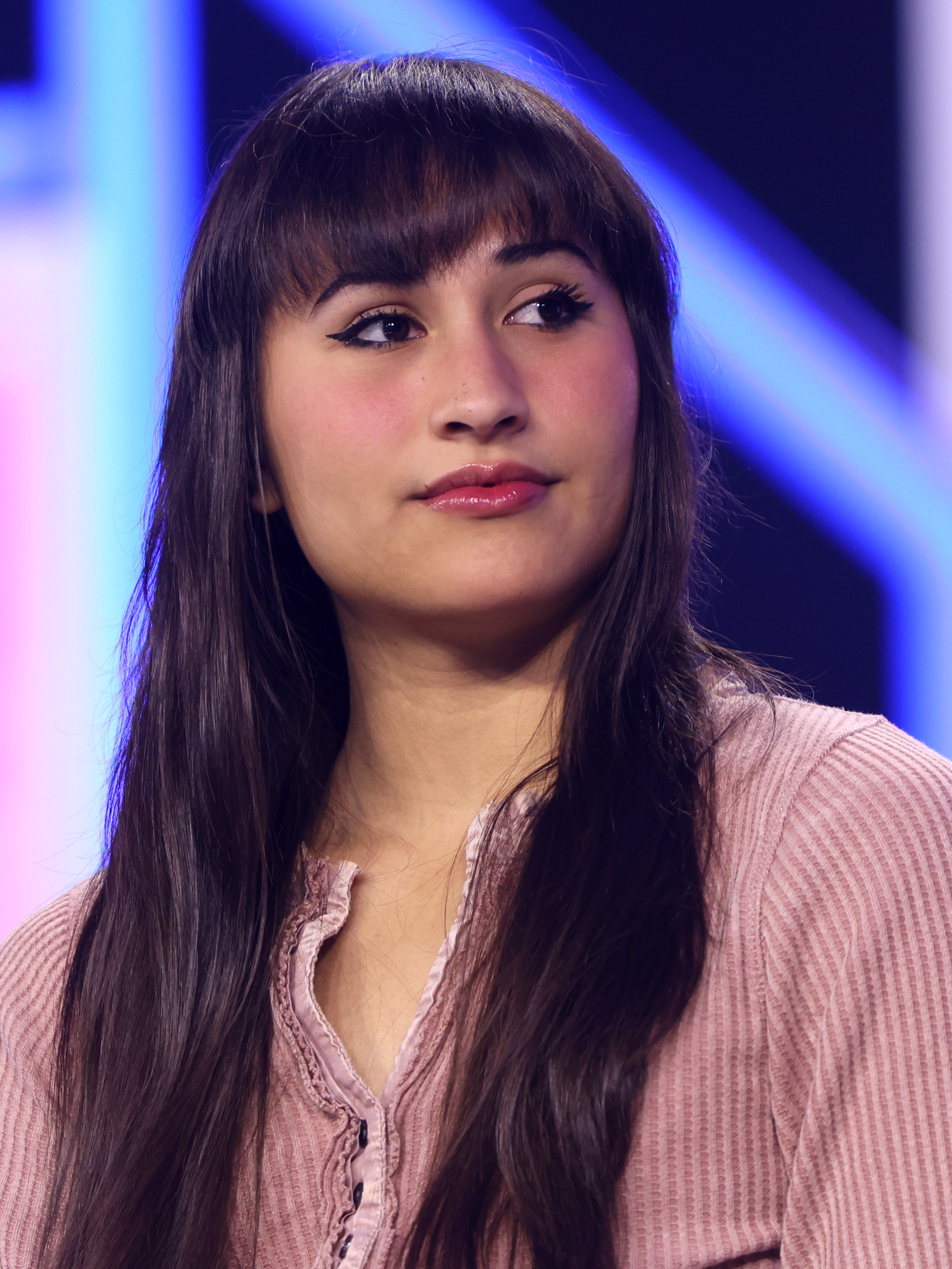
- Cole in 2024
- Born: July 27, 2004 (age 22); California, U.S.
- Years active: 2022–present
- Known for: Opposing medical gender transition for minors

Chloe Cole (born July 27, 2004) is an American activist who opposes gender-affirming care for minors and supports bans on such care following her own detransition. She has appeared with conservative politicians and in the media, supporting and advocating for such bans. Cole began transitioning at 12, and at age 13 began undergoing treatment which included puberty blockers, testosterone, and a double mastectomy at age 15. She began detransitioning at 16 after experiencing hallucinations during an LSD trip, and converted to Christianity. She has since filed a lawsuit against Kaiser Permanente and three medical professionals involved in her treatment in 2022, alleging that she did not receive sufficient information to provide informed consent.

== Personal life ==
=== Early life ===
Cole is from California's Central Valley. Cole is the youngest of five children having two sisters and two brothers. She reported facing mental health challenges as a minor, which included being on the autism spectrum. She is a detransitioner and describes herself as a "former trans kid".

=== Transition ===
Cole says that she first experienced gender dysphoria when she was 9 years old, and discussed her condition with her pediatrician for the first time at age 12. Cole has filed a lawsuit that alleged that between the ages of 13 and 16 years old, Kaiser Permanente physicians placed her on puberty blockers, cross-sex hormone treatment, and performed a double mastectomy on her.

She has described herself as having been a "tomboy" who did not fit social norms and only started thinking about transitioning after creating an Instagram account.

In February 2018, she was prescribed the puberty blocker Lupron when age 13. A month later, she started testosterone injections, which she continued for two years. Cole had a double mastectomy at age 15 in June 2020.

=== Detransition ===
Less than a year after her mastectomy, after a discussion in school about breastfeeding and pregnancy, Cole began to regret her transition. At 17, she reverted to using her birth name and detransitioned. Cole has said that her doctor did not follow the standards of care from the World Professional Association for Transgender Health (WPATH) and that she did not know detransitioners existed until she was one. When she expressed regret to her gender care specialist, they offered to recommend a surgeon for breast reconstruction, which she decided not to pursue.

A therapist who examined Cole said in a court filing that Cole decided to detransition during an LSD trip at 16 when she heard a female voice, telling her that she was lying to herself about being a boy, and that following this she became a Christian, and requested a Christian therapist.

Cole's parents have stayed out of the media spotlight. Cole says she does not hold them responsible for consenting to her treatment and surgery and that they "received intense social pressure and pressure from medical professionals".

== Activism ==
=== Legislation ===
Starting in May 2022, Cole began testifying in the United States against medical transition and appeared on Fox News to denounce gender-affirming care for minors. She has said that neither minors nor their parents should be able to consent to such care and that parents face "extreme external pressures to consent." Cole's views on gender-affirming care for minors diverge from those of most major associations of medical professionals, including the American Academy of Pediatrics, American Medical Association, American Psychological Association, and WPATH. Cole works as a patient advocate for the group Do No Harm and charges up to $5,000 to speak at public events.

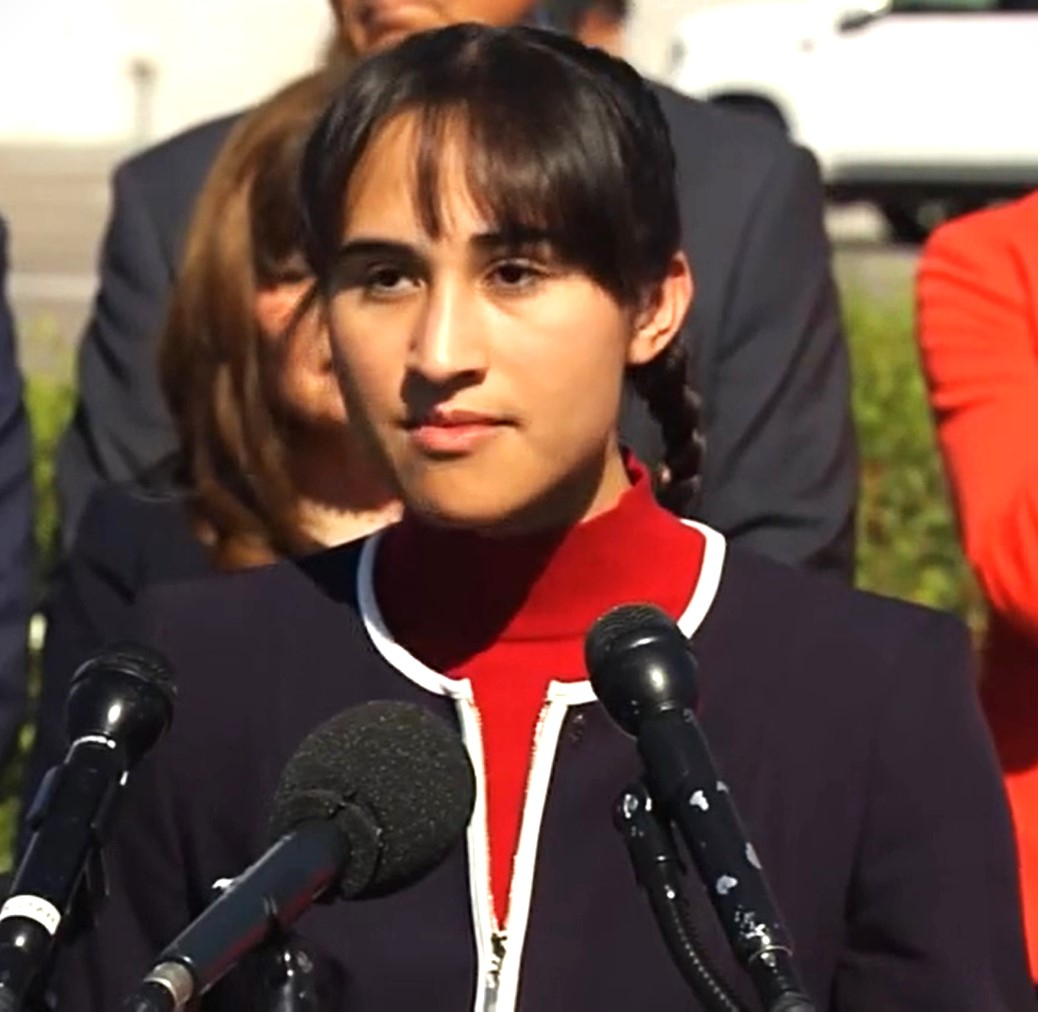
Cole in 2022

In May 2022, Cole testified in support of Ohio House Bill 454, which would ban gender-affirming care for minors. In July, Cole testified in favor of an eventually passed Florida bill that denied Medicaid coverage for puberty blockers and gender-affirming hormones or surgery for all ages. In October Cole spoke to the Florida Board of Medicine in favor of a measure that would bar minors from "receiving puberty blockers, hormone therapy or surgeries as treatment for gender dysphoria".

In September, Cole spoke at a press conference organized by Republican Congresswoman Marjorie Taylor Greene in support of her "Protect Children's Innocence Act", which would make it a felony to provide any gender-affirming care to a minor, prohibit the use of federal funds for gender-affirming care or towards health insurance covering it for all ages, and prohibit colleges from offering instruction in such care. Cole said that while she did not agree with everything any politician says, this bill which "protects children from the harm" that she endured was a cause she "could get behind". The same month, Cole testified against a bill introduced by Senator Scott Wiener to make California a sanctuary state for children seeking gender-affirming care.

In September 2022, Dawn Ennis, writing for the LGBT newspaper Los Angeles Blade, described Cole as "the poster child for far-right politicians and religious conservatives working to ban gender-affirming care and to prosecute the doctors and parents who support their children's transitions for child abuse."

In January 2023, Cole testified in support of bills banning gender-affirming care for transgender minors in Utah and Tennessee. She also voiced support for a law proposed by Wyoming state senator Anthony Bouchard, Senate File 144, which he dubbed "Chloe's Law" after Cole, that would lead to doctors' licenses being revoked if they administer gender-affirming care to minors. In February, Cole testified in favor of Kansas Senate Bill 233, which would ban gender-affirming care for minors, revoke the licenses of doctors who provided such care, and allow for civil suits against them. She also accepted an invitation from the conservative think tank the Idaho Freedom Foundation to testify in support of an Idaho bill that would ban gender-affirming care for minors and make providing such care a felony.

=== Rallies ===
In October 2022, Cole was among a number of speakers at a "Rally to End Child Mutilation" hosted by right-wing commentator Matt Walsh in Nashville.

In January 2023, Cole was one of five panelists who spoke at an event titled "Stolen Innocence: A Panel on the Insidious Ideology Infecting Your Children's Education", about schools allegedly sexually grooming students by teaching them about gender identity and sexual orientation.

The same month in Murfreesboro, Tennessee, Cole was a speaker at a "Teens Against Gender Mutilation Rally", sponsored by Turning Point USA. Cole described the trans community as "a cult" and spoke against gender-affirming care for minors. Eventbrite reportedly unpublished the listing due to violating their policies on "Hateful, Dangerous, or Violent Content and Events".

In March 2023, she spoke at the Conservative Political Action Conference in Washington DC, on a panel titled "A Time for Courage".

Later that month, Cole headlined a Detransition Awareness Day rally in Sacramento, CA. Roughly 40 people gathered in opposition to gender-affirming care. Nearby, counter-protesters gathered.

On April 17, 2023, Cole spoke along with Dr. Carrie Mendoza at an event at Dartmouth College. Cole said that she believed that children were too young to make "lasting medical decisions", adding that "if you are a fully grown adult … and completely understand the consequences, yes, I support you getting that surgery."

On December 4, 2024, Cole spoke at a rally to oppose gender-affirming care organized by Do No Harm outside the Supreme Court of the United States during the oral arguments for United States v. Skrmetti, which determined in June 2025 that bans on gender-affirming care for minors are constitutional.

=== Platform ===
In mid-July 2022, she started a GoFundMe called "Imperfectly Me", aimed at providing a platform for detransitioners.

=== Views ===
Cole suggested that the Annunciation Catholic Church shooting could have been caused by social support for transgender people, stating that society is "lying to them, and telling them they were born wrong, yet we expect them to turn out normal?"

== Lawsuit ==
On November 9, 2022, Cole filed a 90-day notice of intent to sue against the healthcare company Kaiser Permanente along with the individual endocrinologist, psychiatrist, and plastic surgeon involved in her treatment. Cole was represented by Harmeet Dhillon (the chief executive of the Center for American Liberty) and the law firm LiMandri & Jonna LLP. The lawsuit was filed in the San Joaquin County Superior Court in Manteca on February 22, 2023. Kaiser Permanente attempted to move the case into arbitration behind closed doors, but in September 2025 the California Courts of Appeal ruled that the case should go to trial. The trial is scheduled for April 5, 2027.

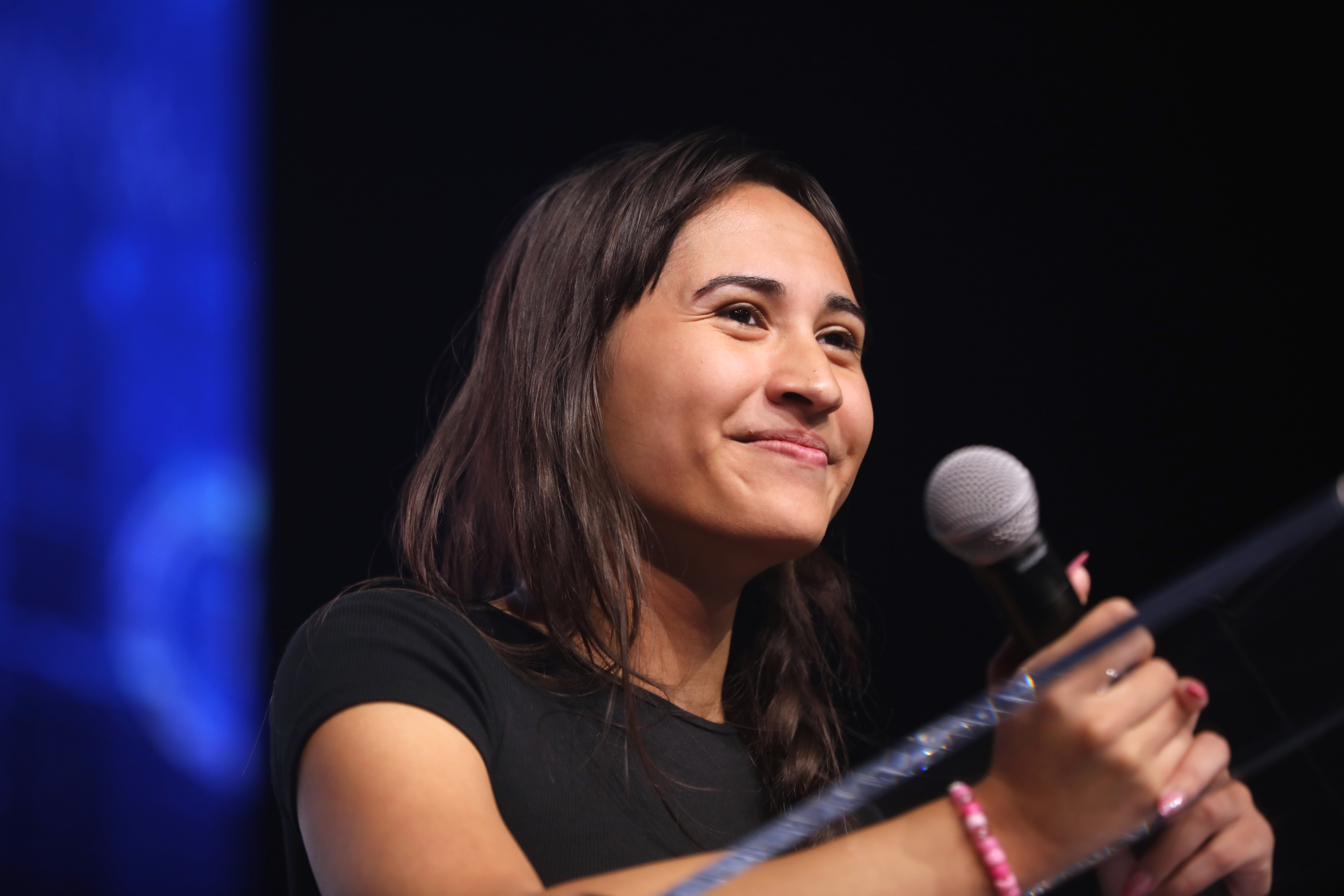
Cole at Huntington Place in Detroit, Michigan in 2024

According to the lawsuit, Cole's care included "off label" treatment and "amounted to medical experimentation." According to the suit, Cole was not given adequate information to provide informed consent to her hormone therapy and later developed joint pain, osteoporosis, and ongoing urinary tract infections. The complaint states that doctors did not inform her parents of alternative, less invasive treatments like psychiatric care, and that they told her that her gender dysphoria would "never resolve unless she chemically and surgically transitioned," and subjected the family to intense pressure by falsely warning that Cole was at high risk of suicide unless she transitioned, presenting transition as the only option, and giving her parents the ultimatum: "would you rather have a dead daughter or a live son?" According to the suit, this "unethical form of coercion" backed the family "into a corner" with "no option but to continue moving forward with transition and surgery."

The San Francisco Chronicle described Cole's case as a "political touchstone for conservative groups pushing against transgender rights and access to gender-affirming care for young people." The Economist opined that, should detransitioning lawsuits such as Cole's be successful, insurers could come to regard gender transition treatments as a liability, which would raise the treatment costs and make providers more careful about advertising; it added that, if the facts of the case were as claimed, that could cause rethinking of how care is currently provided.

== See also ==
- Bell v Tavistock – court case in the United Kingdom about the use of puberty blockers
