= Oli London =

British Internet personality (born 1990)

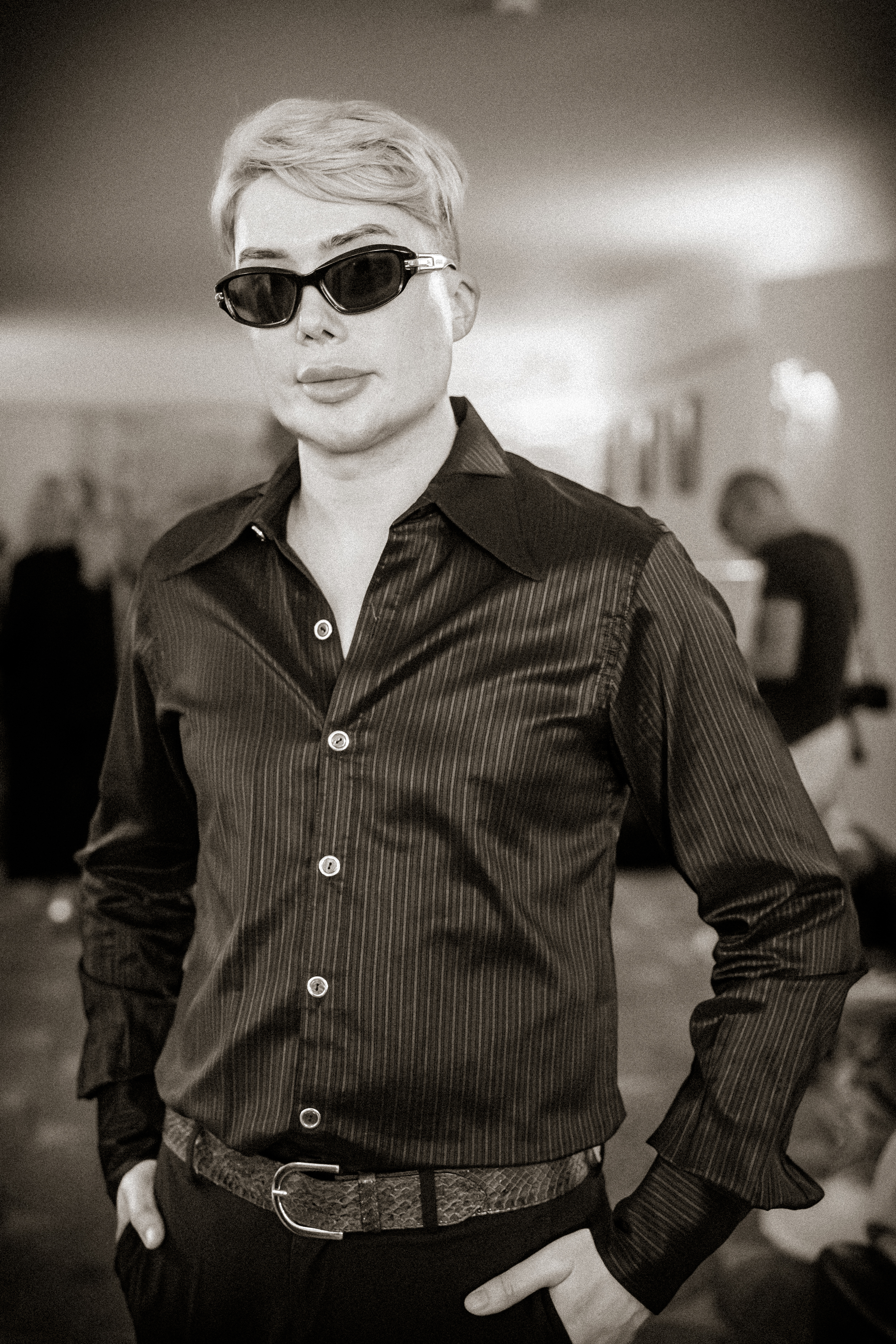
- London at the 2023 Venice Film Festival
- Born: 14 January 1990 (age 36); England, United Kingdom
- Occupation: Internet personality
- Years active: 2018–present

YouTube information
- Channel: Oli London
- Years active: 8 years ago
- Genres: Vlog; music
- Subscribers: 93.9 thousand
- Views: 21.49 million
- Last updated: 26 April 2026

Oli London (born 14 January 1990) is an English Internet personality. London is known for his multiple ethnic plastic surgery procedures intended to make him look like Jimin, a member of the South Korean boy band BTS, and Rosé, a member of the South Korean girl group BLACKPINK.

Born in England, London's interest in South Korean culture began after moving to South Korea in 2013 to teach English. In 2022, he announced that he would no longer undergo surgeries and that he had converted to Christianity and was planning to receive baptism in the Catholic Church. He thereafter affiliated himself with the anti-gender movement.

== Early life ==
London was born on 14 January 1990. His father is an interior designer and his mother is a housewife.

London's interest in South Korea began in 2013, after arriving in Seoul to teach English for a year. London's partner, a Korean, taught him many Korean phrases; but according to London, he forgot almost everything he was taught due to his poor memory. He also began researching the country's culture, and became familiar with many South Korean music groups. He became particularly interested in BTS, and began idolising popular member Jimin.

The same year, London began having surgeries designed to make his face resemble Jimin. On Jimin's face, London stated: "Obviously, he's changed over the years. But he's just got a very round, cute baby face, the most beautiful eyes, his smile, everything about him."

== Career ==
=== Television ===
London's television career is composed solely of guest appearances, all of which focus predominantly on his surgeries. He started attracting media attention after appearing in a 2018 episode of the Barcroft TV documentary series Hooked on the Look, which presented his multi-surgery process to resemble Jimin.

=== Music ===
In 2019, London began his K-pop career by releasing the single "Perfection", a bilingual English-Korean song revolving on the euphoria he felt after getting his surgeries; it received negative reviews from music critics for its excessive autotune.

In 2020, London released a Christmas song called "Christmas in Korea". Like his other song, he received backlash, this time for cultural reasons.

=== Acting ===
In 2021, London starred in the partially fictionalised short documentary film Gangnam Beauty. It was screened at the International Documentary Film Festival Amsterdam, and London starred in two roles: as himself and as a sculptor forced to make fourteen different masks to save their village from the gods' wrath.

== Personal life ==
"In Korea, having white skin is considered a sign of perfection or beauty. And Koreans go to great, great lengths to maintain that skin. You know, they don't go in the sea and stuff. They avoid the sun. I do go to great lengths—I also avoid the sun. I would like my skin to be, like, super, super, like Snow White, like Korean people. I get upset that some people think it's racist. I'm not racist."

— Oli London, 2022

London has been a former supporter of the Black Lives Matter movement. He has since backtracked, and is now a vocal opponent of BLM and "woke culture".

London describes himself as someone with "an obsessive and impulsive personality". He practices speaking Korean with a private teacher every week. He dated the French pornographic actress Angelique Morgan. London has spoken of his poor relationships with family and friends and society's negative views towards him because of his racial identity. This eventually meant that he had difficulty finding a romantic relationship and caused him to become reclusive.

=== Religion and spiritual beliefs ===
London is a former atheist. Previously he was said to worship a cardboard cut-out of Jimin and even prayed to the singer. He has criticised the Islamic doctrines of women's dress codes. In November 2022, London announced his conversion to Christianity and his intention to be baptized in Catholic Church.

=== Transracial identity ===
Although he is of White British descent, London has previously identified as South Korean. His self-identification attracted worldwide attention and stirred debate around the validity of being transracial compared to being transgender. Sandra Song of Paper magazine accused him of fetishising South Korean culture, calling what he had done "incredibly offensive, especially since it effectively trivializes our identities because they're suddenly 'trendy.'" London has claimed to have received death threats on the Internet for being "transracial" but defended his identity as personal and said his intention was solely to appreciate the culture. Others showed support for him. American activist Rachel Dolezal, who similarly attracted controversy due to her racial identity, stated that someone's personal identity (including London's) should not be other people's main concern.

=== Gender and sexuality ===
London came out as non-binary during the Pride Month of 2021, announcing that he used they/them pronouns as well as neopronouns inspired by Korea and Jimin.

In mid-2022, he came out as a genderfluid trans woman and announced plans to get further surgeries to look like Blackpink member Rosé.

In October 2022, he told E! News that he was detransitioning, saying that he wanted to "go back to being [his] original self—a biological man", and updated his Instagram bio to indicate that he uses he/him pronouns. He thereafter affiliated himself with the anti-gender movement. London's book Gender Madness was published in August 2023. He also appeared in the 2023 film Detrans.

=== Plastic surgeries ===
In March 2022, London announced plans for penis reduction surgeries, stating that "in Korea, [the average] penis is like 3.5 inches [...] People say, 'Oh, you can't be Korean. You're not 100 percent Korean,' and I just want to be 100 percent Korean. I would even have a penis reduction so I'm, like, the Korean average." This statement brought him criticism for promoting stereotypes of East Asian men.

At the time of his detransition in October 2022, he had undergone 32 surgeries, including six nose jobs, an eye surgery, a facelift, a brow lift, a temple lift, a tooth procedure, and skin whitening injections. He stated that he planned to stop getting further surgeries, which he said he had "undergone in [his] obsessive quest chasing perfection".
