= Retransition =

Retransition may refer to:

- Sometimes, the term is used as a synonym of detransition
- A subsequent gender transition following a detransition
- Part of the development section of a sonata
