= Juno Obedin-Maliver =

Doctor and researcher for LGBTQ+ community

Juno Obedin-Maliver is an American Associate Professor in the Department of Obstetrics and Gynecology at the Stanford University School of Medicine. She is a board-certified obstetrician/gynecologist who is also the co-director of The Population Research in Identity and Disparities for Equality (PRIDE) Study. The PRIDE Study is a longitudinal cohort based at Stanford. The goal of the PRIDE Study is to help answer how being LGBTQIA+ influences physical, mental, and social health. Obedin-Maliver specializes in reproductive health needs of sexual and gender minorities, and she is working to advance medical care for these minority populations. She is also a Master Certified Physician Development Coach (Physician Coaching Institute, ICF Level I) and currently sits on the medical advisory board of the University of California San Francisco Center of Excellence for Transgender Health. Obedin-Maliver is helping to author the next version of the World Professional Association for Transgender Health (WPATH) Standards of Care. She is active in health policy, working to help legally redefine consideration of sexually intimate partner status as well as working to help remove Medicare Non-Coverage Determination ruling for gender-affirming surgeries. Obedin-Maliver is also a member of the Maternal & Child Health Research Institute (MCHRI).

== Early life and education ==
Obedin-Maliver attended Hampshire College and received her Bachelor of Arts degree in 2004. She received her Masters in Public Health from the University of California, Berkeley in 2008. She completed her residency in 2014 at the University of California, San Francisco. She then completed her Master of Science in Clinical Research at the University of California, San Francisco (2016). She completed her fellowship at the San Francisco Veterans Affairs Medical Center & University of California, San Francisco in 2016.

== Selected publications and research ==
Obedin-Maliver has been involved in a number of research studies to identify differences in health experiences and medical care needs for the LGBT community.

- 2011: Lesbian, Gay, Bisexual, and Transgender–Related Content in Undergraduate Medical Education
- 2014: Transgender men who experienced pregnancy after female-to-male gender transitioning
- 2015: Lesbian, Gay, Bisexual, and Transgender Patient Care: Medical Students' Preparedness and Comfort
- 2015: Transgender men and pregnancy
- 2017: From erasure to opportunity: a qualitative study of the experiences of transgender men around pregnancy and recommendations for providers
- 2020: The Imperative for Transgender and Gender Nonbinary Inclusion - Beyond Women's Health
- 2020: What Sexual and Gender Minority People Want Researchers to Know About Sexual Orientation and Gender Identity Questions: A Qualitative Study
- 2020: Community norms for the Eating Disorder Examination Questionnaire (EDE-Q) among transgender men and women
- 2020: Pregnancy intentions and outcomes among transgender, nonbinary, and gender-expansive people assigned female or intersex at birth in the United States: Results from a national, quantitative survey
- 2021: Minority Stress, Structural Stigma, and Physical Health Among Sexual and Gender Minority Individuals: Examining the Relative Strength of the Relationships
- 2021: Abortion experiences and preferences of transgender, nonbinary, and gender-expansive people in the United States
- 2022: Standards of Care for the Health of Transgender and Gender Diverse People, Version 8
- 2022: The All of Us Research Program: Data quality, utility, and diversity

== Personal and family ==
Juno identifies as a lesbian and has a female partner. Together they have a daughter who was born in 2017.
