= Paul A. Walker (psychologist) =

American social psychologist (1946–1991)

Paul Allen Walker (September 29, 1946 – November 16, 1991) was an American social psychologist and founding president of HBIGDA, the Harry Benjamin International Gender Dysphoria Association now known as WPATH, the World Professional Association for Transgender Health in 1979. He also served as director of the Janus Information Facility.

Walker graduated with a doctorate in social psychology from the University of Rochester in 1976. He performed research with John Money via the Office of Psychohormonal Research at Johns Hopkins University School of Medicine.

Walker began a sex offender treatment program at the University of Texas Medical Branch in Galveston, Texas, in 1976. He also ran the Gender Clinic.

Walker established a private practice in the early 1980s and later relocated his office to 1952 Union Street in San Francisco, California. He treated transgender patients, including individuals with gender dysphoria whose gender identity differed from their sex assigned at birth. After publicly coming out as gay, Walker lived on Castro Street, a center of San Francisco's LGBTQ community. He continued his practice, specializing in the care of patients seeking sex reassignment surgery (SRS), until near the end of his life.

To help protect patient confidentiality, Walker frequently recorded a diagnosis of "anxiety" in medical records rather than documenting gender-related care directly. This practice was intended to preserve privacy while patients completed the real-life test, now commonly referred to as social transition. At the time, standards of care generally required patients to live for at least one year in a gender role consistent with their gender identity before undergoing sex reassignment surgery.

Walker died in November 1991 complications from HIV/AIDS.
