= Philadelphia Trans Wellness Conference =

LGBTQ conference in Philadelphia, Pennsylvania, USA

The Philadelphia Trans Wellness Conference (formerly Philadelphia Trans Health Conference) was an annual conference related to transgender health and wellness for transgender people, advocates, and healthcare providers. It was run by the Mazzoni Center and was the largest free trans-focused conference in the world.

On April 4th, 2025, organizers announced that the conference would be cancelled, shifting to year-round programming.

== History ==
The conference emerged in response to the lack of healthcare resources and access for the transgender community in Philadelphia. An April 1999 survey conducted by the Philadelphia Transgender Health Action Coalition (which would later become the Mazzoni Center) exposed problems of transgender people being denied treatment for general healthcare problems, needing to educate providers on transgender healthcare issues, and a lack of understanding of transgender issues in HIV service providers specifically.

PTHAC, the Philadelphia EMA HIV Transgender/Transsexual Caucus, and the Philadelphia AIDS Consortium partnered to plan and fund a 3-day conference to address these issues. In the Summer of 2001, the organizations formed a planning committee consisting of Charlene Arcila, June Dizon, Ben Singer, and Ron Powers. Due to a lack of funding, the conference was made a single day rather than three.

The first conference, entitled "Trans-Health for the New Millennium," took place on May 5, 2002. From 2006 until 2020, it was held at the Philadelphia Convention Center.

=== 2017 ===
In 2017, the Mazzoni Center canceled two panel discussions on detransition and alternate methods of working with gender dysphoria. The conference organizers said, "When a topic becomes controversial, such as this one has turned on social media, there is a duty to make sure that the debate does not get out of control at the conference itself. After several days of considerations and reviewing feedback, the planning committee voted that the workshops, while valid, cannot be presented at the conference as planned."

=== 2020-2022 ===
Due to the COVID-19 pandemic, the Mazzoni Center postponed the conference that was scheduled to occur that year between June 23–25. They chose to move the conference to a virtual format in 2021, and again in 2022.

=== 2023 ===
On April 5, 2023, the Mazzoni Center announced on the conference's website that the team would be using 2023 as a planning and development year and that the conference would not be taking place that year. They hosted a community conversation in partnership with the Mayor's Office of LGBTQ Affairs on May 3 of that year.

=== 2024 ===
In March 2024, the Mazzoni Center announced that the conference would be resuming in-person with a limited capacity of 1,000 participants. Unlike in previous years, the location was also changed to the Temple University campus.

=== 2025 ===
On April 4th, 2025, the Mazzoni Center announced that the conference would be shifting from a single event to year-round programming, feeling that it would best serve the community in light of the second Trump administration's attacks on transgender people. With that decision, they also renamed the organization to the Charlene Arcila Trans Wellness Collective in onor of the conference's founder.

== Content ==
The conference hosts a variety of activities, such as workshops, religious services, certifications, and vendor spaces.

Attendees can take the general, professional, and continuing education tracts. In 2012, the conference also launched a youth summit with workshops and social events specifically for youth.

== See also ==
Southern Comfort Conference - another large transgender-related conference in the United States
