= Real-life experience =

Duration of time required for gender affirming treatments

The real-life experience (RLE), sometimes called the real-life test (RLT), was a condition of living full-time in one's identified gender role in order to be eligible to receive gender-affirming treatment. The purpose of the RLE has been to confirm that a given transgender person could function successfully as a member of said gender in society, as well as to confirm that they are sure they want to live as said gender for the rest of their life. A documented RLE was previously a requirement of many physicians before prescribing gender-affirming hormone therapy, and a requirement of most surgeons before performing gender-affirming surgery.

In September 2022, the World Professional Association for Transgender Health (WPATH) Standards of Care for the Health of Transgender and Gender Diverse People (SOC) Version 8 were released and removed the requirement of RLE for all gender-affirming treatments, including gender-affirming surgery. Previous versions of the WPATH SOC had required completion of RLE for initiation of gender-affirming hormone therapy (3 months) and gender-affirming surgery (12 months).

== Criteria ==
=== Standards of Care ===
==== Version 6 ====
The sixth version of the World Professional Association for Transgender Health's (WPATH) Standards of Care (SOC), published in 2001, listed the parameters of the RLE as follows:

1. To maintain full or part-time employment;
2. To function as a student;
3. To function in community-based volunteer activity;
4. To undertake some combination of items 1–3;
5. To acquire a (legal) gender-identity-appropriate first name;
6. To provide documentation that persons other than the therapist know that the patient functions in the desired gender role.

==== Version 7 ====
The seventh version of the SOC, which was published in 2011, was more ambiguous, and did not list any specific parameters for the RLE. Instead, they merely stated that the individual should be living full-time in their preferred gender role continuously for the duration of the RLE. They also stated that documentation of a name and/or gender marker change can be presented as a way of providing proof that the RLE has been completed, but did not state that a name and/or gender marker change was a requirement for completion of the RLE. These changes may have been signs of WPATH moving away from gatekeeping, which the SOC had been criticized for.

The seventh version of the SOC state that medical professionals should clearly document a patient's RLE in their medical chart, including the start date of living full-time for those preparing for GRS. Sometimes surgeons may require proof that the RLE has been completed. The SOC state that, if applicable, proof may be provided in the form of communication with individuals who have related to the patient in a gender identity-congruent role (such as, presumably, the patient's physician, therapist, boss, or a teacher), or as documentation of a legal name and/or gender marker change.

==== Version 8 ====
The eighth version of the SOC, published in 2022, removed all requirement of RLE for gender-affirming treatments, including gender-affirming surgery.

== Necessity ==
The SOC are followed by most medical professionals who specialize in the care of transgender individuals, and are the most widely followed clinical guidelines for the treatment of transgender persons in use. Hence, the SOC criteria for HRT and GRS, including completion of an RLE when applicable, must usually be met for one who seeks such treatments to receive them.

As of the seventh version of the SOC, a three-month minimum requirement of RLE is no longer part of WPATH's recommended criteria for HRT. A referral letter alone from a qualified mental health professional now suffices. The SOC state:

Although professionals may recommend living in the desired gender, the decision as to when and how to begin the real-life experience remains the person's responsibility.

With respect to mastectomy/chest reconstruction and breast augmentation, the seventh version of the SOC do not require an RLE for these procedures; nor is an RLE required for hysterectomy, salpingo-oophorectomy, or orchiectomy, or for other procedures such as facial feminization surgery and voice feminization surgery. However, for GRS, including metoidioplasty, phalloplasty, and vaginoplasty, one year of continuous RLE is a listed requirement.

Previous versions of the SOC stated that an RLE for GRS was an absolute requirement that could not be skipped or ignored. However, the seventh version of the SOC appears to be less stringent, and does not contain any such statements. In addition, WPATH emphasizes that the SOC are merely clinical guidelines, and are intended to be both flexible and modifiable to meet the circumstances of the patient and the preferences and judgement of the clinician. Hence, the latest version of the SOC appears to allow for, in certain circumstances, the RLE to be skipped.

Clinical practice in many places may be more or less stringent. In the United Kingdom, most National Health Service trusts will require two years of RLE before surgery, whereas in countries such as Thailand and Mexico, some surgeons may not require the completion of any RLE at all.

== Criticism ==
Though the WPATH SOC's one-year RLE requirement prior to GRS has been widely followed by surgeons in the past, it has not gone without criticism. Like the previous three-month RLE requirement for hormone therapy, many transgender people have expressed displeasure with it and have declared that it is unnecessary. Alongside this, some private providers did not require RLE to prescribe hormone therapy. Supporting such claims, physician and sexologist Anne Lawrence, in a paper presented at the XVII Harry Benjamin International Symposium on Gender Dysphoria in 2001, stated that there is little scientific evidence that a one-year RLE is necessary or sufficient for favorable outcomes following GRS. In addition, she presented the results of a study she conducted on a group of trans women in which she showed that GRS without a prior one-year RLE could be undergone without the subsequent expression of regret. She concluded that her results did not support the SOC requirement of a one-year RLE as an absolute requirement for GRS.

The real life experience requirement for hormone therapy has also been described by some as "unreasonable" and "dangerous", due to the patient's physical appearance often not matching their declared gender prior to starting hormone therapy.

Further in support of the idea that a one-year RLE requirement prior to GRS is unnecessary, regret, as well as suicide, appear to be very rare in post-operative transgender people in general. In another study conducted by Anne Lawrence and published in 2003, she found that in a group of 232 post-operative trans women, none expressed outright regret, and only a few expressed even occasional regret. In addition, a 2002 review of the literature reported that there is less than a 1% rate of regret, and a little more than a 1% rate of suicide, among post-operative transgender people; for comparison, the rate of suicide in the general population is only about 1%, while the suicide attempt rate of the transgender population as a whole was around 41% per a 2013 publication.

Amnesty International emphasized in 2017 that the RLE has been criticized by the Committee on the Elimination of Discrimination against Women for promoting stereotypical gender roles.

Perhaps in response to such criticisms, the WPATH SOC Version 8 removed the requirement of RLE for all gender-affirming treatments.

== See also ==
- Gender transitioning
- List of transgender-related topics
