= Standards of Care for the Health of Transgender and Gender Diverse People =

Healthcare protocol

The Standards of Care for the Health of Transgender and Gender Diverse People (SOC) is an international clinical protocol by the World Professional Association for Transgender Health (WPATH) outlining the recommended assessment and treatment for transgender and gender-diverse individuals across the lifespan including social, hormonal, or surgical transition. It often influences clinicians' decisions regarding patients' treatment. While other standards, protocols, and guidelines exist – especially outside the United States – the WPATH SOC is the most widespread protocol used by professionals working with transgender or gender-variant people.

Version 8 of the WPATH SOC, the latest version, was released online on September 15, 2022.

== History and development ==
Prior to the advent of the first SOC, there was no semblance of consensus on psychiatric, psychological, medical, and surgical requirements or procedures. Before the 1960s, few countries offered safe, legal medical options and many criminalized cross-gender behaviors or mandated unproven psychiatric treatments. In response to this problem, the Harry Benjamin International Gender Dysphoria Association (now known as the World Professional Association for Transgender Health) authored one of the earliest sets of clinical guidelines for the express purpose of ensuring "lasting personal comfort with the gendered self in order to maximize overall psychological well-being and self-fulfillment."

The WPATH SOC are periodically updated and revised. The eighth and latest version was released on September 15, 2022. Previous versions were released in 1979 (1st), 1980 (2nd), 1981 (3rd), 1990 (4th), 1998 (5th), 2001 (6th), and 2012 (7th).

== WPATH SOC ==
=== Versions 1 to 4 ===
The first four versions of the Standards of Care were titled Standards of Care: The Hormonal and Surgical Sex Reassignment of Gender Dysphoric Persons. The first version was released in 1979 and revisions were made in 1980, 1981, and 1990. These revisions were relatively minor, with the text staying mostly the same between versions. These versions of the SOC followed the gatekeeping model laid out by Harry Benjamin, where clinicians set strict eligibility requirements, requiring evaluations from separate mental health professionals and compulsory psychotherapy.

The first four versions of the Standards of Care were published as standalone documents by the Harry Benjamin International Gender Dysphoria Association. However, the third version was also published as a 1985 reprint in the journal Archives of Sexual Behavior.

While considered useful, the Standards of Care were seen as flawed by the trans community. They objected to the standards requiring intent for surgery to access hormones, the grouping of mastectomy with genital surgeries, and excessive amounts of required therapy. The standards were overly restrictive and acted as a barrier to necessary care.

=== Version 5 ===
In the 1990s, WPATH was struggling to operate due to criticisms of their SOC in the trans community such as the requirement of the real life test, where patients had to socially transition for up to a year prior to hormones. These critiques developed into a trans-led Advocacy and Liaison committee, marking the first time trans people were officially and actively consulted regarding their treatment. The 5th version, published in 1998, was titled the "Standards of Care for Gender Identity Disorders" to be consistent with the DSM-III. It recommended but did not require psychotherapy and stated that while GID was a mental disorder, that was not a license for stigma.

=== Version 6 ===
The sixth version was published in 2001 and offered more flexibility and individualized care but continued to use the phrase "gender identity disorder". At the same time, transgender people increasingly complained of having to "jump through hoops". SOC 6 also did not include significant changes to the tasks mental health professionals were required to take or in the general recommendations for content of the letters of readiness. An important change in the eligibility criteria for GAH allowed providers to prescribe hormones even if patients had not undergone the "Real Life Test" or psychotherapy if it was for harm reduction purposes. A notable change in version six separated the eligibility and readiness criteria for top and bottom surgery allowing some patients, particularly individuals assigned female at birth, to receive a mastectomy.

=== Version 7 ===
The seventh version, titled "Standards of Care for the Health of Transsexual, Transgender, and Gender Nonconforming People", was published in 2012 both in the International Journal of Transgenderism and as a standalone document. Included in the guidelines are sections on purpose and use of the WPATH SOC, the global applicability of the WPATH SOC, the difference between gender nonconformity and gender dysphoria, epidemiology, treatment of children, adolescents and adults, mental health, hormone replacement therapy (masculinizing or feminizing; HRT), reproductive health, voice and communication therapy, gender-affirming surgery, lifelong preventive and primary care, applicability of the WPATH SOC to people living in institutional environments, and applicability of the WPATH SOC to people with disorders of sex development.

The seventh version also includes acknowledgements of the ever-evolving language used to describe and treat transsexual, transgender, and gender non-conforming individuals. There is an emphasis placed on the idea that identifying with these labels does not inherently qualify someone as disordered, and that treatment should be focused on the alleviation of any suffering caused by gender dysphoria. They make a stance against the "deprivation of civil and human rights" on the grounds of someone's gender identity. This version, much like its predecessor requires referrals for surgical procedures based on set criteria, but notes the importance of informed consent and listening to the wishes of the patient.

The seventh version includes a section distinguishing between cases of gender dysphoria and non-conformity for children and adolescents, as well as recommended treatment paths for each.

A systematic review into international guidelines for management of gender dysphoria and gender incongruence in children and adolescents published as part of the Cass Review in 2024 stated WPATH SOC 7 lacked "developmental rigour and transparency".

=== Version 8 ===
The eighth version, titled "Standards of Care for the Health of Transgender and Gender Diverse People", was published in 2022. It gives recommendations for health professionals in eighteen chapters. The guidelines were developed by a multidisciplinary committee of experts, building on previous versions and using the Delphi method. Version 8 is the first one to include a chapter on adolescent care separate from that on the care of children. This version of the protocol gives no specific age limits for treatments, emphasizing the need to decide individually for each patient. It was criticized for suggesting that young people may come to believe they are transgender through social influence.

An earlier draft was criticized by transgender advocates and healthcare providers for including requirements that adolescents evidence "several years" of gender incongruence and that they must undergo comprehensive diagnostic assessments, which was regarded as pathologizing and gatekeeping. The final draft maintained the requirement of an assessment but changed "several years" to "marked and sustained over time". The draft also lowered recommended age minimums to 14 for hormone treatments, 15 for mastectomies, 16 for breast augmentation and facial surgeries, and 17 for genital surgeries and hysterectomies. Assistant Secretary Levine of the US Department of Health and Human Services (HHS) recommended removing the age limits, which WPATH declined. WPATH removed the age limits from the final draft after the American Academy of Pediatrics said they'd withdraw support of the guidelines if they did not.

In August 2024, the Republican chairwoman Lisa McClain of the U.S. Congress Subcommittee on Health Care and Financial Services opened a probe into alleged "political interference" with WPATH's guidelines from the HHS. The guidelines became a focus of controversy during the debate over the Scottish government's Gender Recognition Reform Bill in 2022. Opponents of the bill highlighted the chapter on eunuchs, which proposes eunuch be considered a gender identity, and criticised NHS Scotland's association with WPATH. NHS England commissioned the Cass Review to create guidelines for transgender people in England. A systematic review into international guidelines published as part of the review was published in 2024 and stated that WPATH SOC 8 lacked "developmental rigour and transparency".

==== Populations ====
Issues specific to certain demographics, including adults, children, and adolescents, as described in chapters 5–11 of version 8:

===== Adults =====
Version 8 (SOC8) introduced an Assessment of Adults chapter, which was the first dedicated gender-affirming clinical evaluation for adults. Chapter 5 specifically recommended that adults seeking gender-affirming care should undergo an individualized assessment rather than a standardized process; clinicians must evaluate an individual's capacity to provide informed consent, including understanding the effects of treatment on reproductive health and fertility. The most substantial update for SOC8 guidelines was the requirement of "only one letter of referral by a mental health provider for an individual who wishes to undergo medical and surgical treatment". SOC8 also recommends against any form of mandatory psychotherapy, including conversion therapy, prior to accessing hormonal or surgical treatment. Also clearly specified for the first time was specific guidance on detransition.

===== Adolescents =====
In a departure from previous versions, Version 8 draws a conceptual distinction between adolescents and children, with separate chapters.

Continued care and careful assessment of cognitive maturity by qualified mental health professionals is recommended. In contrast to previous versions, there are no absolute requirements for duration of assessments or age to access gender-affirming treatments; rather, individual psychosocial and physical development should be taken into account. The chapter also acknowledges the disproportionate increase in adolescents assigned female at birth and notes that social influences may play a role in the expression of gender diversity, while stopping short of endorsing "rapid-onset gender dysphoria".

SOC8 removed all previously stated minimum age thresholds for gender-affirming surgery in adolescents, replacing those qualifications with assessments of cognitive and emotional maturity. A minimum of 12 months of hormone therapy is recommended before most gender-affirming surgeries, with the sole exception of phalloplasty. Parental consent for surgical procedures is recommended but may be dispensed with if assessed as harmful or not feasible. Puberty-suppressing medication may be initiated when an adolescent has reached Tanner Stage 2 of pubertal development, demonstrating early physical signs of puberty.

===== Children =====
Chapter 7 of SOC8 is the first standalone chapter pertaining exclusively to prepubescent children. It does not require gender-affirming medical interventions for prepubescent gender diverse children and instead makes recommendations regarding the psychosocial support of children and their families throughout gender exploration and potential social transitions.

===== Non-binary =====
Non-binary individuals are included for the first time in chapter 8. The chapter acknowledges that non-binary people represent a significant proportion of the gender-diverse population, with estimates between 25% and 50% of those who identify as transgender or gender diverse.

The guidelines recommend that medical treatment and social support be made available to non-binary people in individualized combinations; for example, providing medical interventions without social transition or gender-affirming surgery without hormone therapy. The chapter additionally notes unique experiences of discrimination, minority stress, and difficulty accessing gender-affirming medical treatment among non-binary people, which healthcare providers should take into consideration. WPATH recommends that healthcare providers use practical measures, such as allowing for non-legal name use at intake and providing gender-neutral facilities.

== Treatments ==
Recommendations for treatments, including medical and social aspects of gender transition as well as mental health, as are given in Chapters 12–18.

== See also ==
- Transgender health care
- List of transgender-related topics
