= Bell v Tavistock =

2021 UK case regarding puberty blockers

- Court: Court of Appeal of England and Wales
- Full case name: Bell and another v The Tavistock and Portman NHS Foundation Trust
- Decided: 17 September 2021
- Citation: [2021] EWCA Civ 1363

Case history
- Prior actions: R (on the application of Quincy Bell and A) v Tavistock and Portman NHS Trust and others [2020] EWHC 3274 (Admin), judgment 1 December 2020
- Related action: AB v CD and others

Court membership
- Judges sitting: Original action before the High Court: Dame Victoria Sharp (President of the Queen's Bench Division); Lord Justice Lewis; Mrs Justice Lieven; On appeal: Lord Burnett of Maldon (Lord Chief Justice); Sir Geoffrey Vos (Master of the Rolls); Dame Eleanor King (Lady Justice of Appeal)

Case opinions
- High Court judgment quashed: The High Court should not have issued guidance on the Gillick test and puberty blockers.

Keywords
- puberty blocker

Bell v Tavistock was a case before the Court of Appeal (England and Wales) on the question of whether puberty blockers could be prescribed to under-16s with gender dysphoria. The Court of Appeal said that "it was for clinicians rather than the court to decide on competence" to consent to receive puberty blockers.

The case was related to Gillick competence, the legal principle governing under what circumstances under-16s can consent to medical treatment in their own right. By contrast, people aged 16 or older were presumed to have the ability to consent to medical treatment (Gillick did not apply). The High Court (Administrative Court) ruling, which was overturned on appeal, said that it was unlikely that a child under the age of 16 could be Gillick competent to consent to puberty blocking treatment. The court also said that "[in] respect of young persons aged 16 and over ... we recognise that clinicians may well regard these as cases where the authorisation of the court should be sought prior to commencing the clinical treatment".

In September 2021, the Court of Appeal overturned the High Court judgment, and ruled that the High Court should not have issued guidance on the Gillick test and puberty blockers, because that court should have dismissed the case when it ruled that the Tavistock guidance was lawful. In a separate case (AB v CD and others), the High Court ruled that parents are allowed to give consent on behalf of their children to receive puberty blockers without having to gain a judge's approval.

== Background ==
In October 2019, a legal claim (a request for judicial review) was lodged against the NHS Gender Identity Development Service (GIDS) at its satellite site in Leeds. The suit was brought by "Mrs. A", the mother of a 15-year-old patient on the GIDS waiting list, and Sue Evans, a former nurse at the Leeds GIDS satellite site. It alleged that advice around hormone therapy was "potentially misleading" and that true informed consent could not be given under such circumstances. The suit described hormone therapy as "experimental" and stated that there was "robust evidence" to show long-lasting medical effects of hormone therapy. The lawyer representing the claimants said the lawsuit would be "pressing the case of Gillick to its breaking point".

Some time after January 2020, Evans passed on her role as claimant to Keira Bell. Bell (referred to in court documents as Quincy Bell) began puberty blockers when she was 16, 1 year and 9 months after being referred to GIDS, with the hope of progressing on to testosterone later – which she did at 17. At age 20 Bell had a double mastectomy. In 2019, when she was 22, she stopped taking testosterone. Bell describes regretting her transition.

Bell in hindsight described her transition as being related to her mother's alcoholism, struggling with puberty, struggling with being a lesbian, social isolation, and depression.

== High Court judgment ==
In the judgment delivered on 1 December 2020, which has now been overturned on appeal, the judges said that it was highly unlikely that a child aged 13 or under would be competent enough to give consent to puberty blockers, and that it was doubtful that 14 or 15 year olds could understand the long-term risks and consequences associated with them. Where the young person is 16 or over, "we recognise that clinicians may well regard these as cases where the authorisation of the court should be sought prior to commencing the clinical treatment."

The Court said (126) "Where the decision is significant and life changing then there is a greater onus to ensure that the child understands and is able to weigh the information" and concluded:

151. A child under 16 may only consent to the use of medication intended to suppress puberty where he or she is competent to understand the nature of the treatment. That includes an understanding of the immediate and long-term consequences of the treatment, the limited evidence available as to its efficacy or purpose, the fact that the vast majority of patients proceed to the use of cross-sex hormones, and its potential life changing consequences for a child. There will be enormous difficulties in a child under 16 understanding and weighing up this information and deciding whether to consent to the use of puberty blocking medication. It is highly unlikely that a child aged 13 or under would be competent to give consent to the administration of puberty blockers. It is doubtful that a child aged 14 or 15 could understand and weigh the long-term risks and consequences of the administration of puberty blockers.
152. In respect of young persons aged 16 and over, the legal position is that there is a presumption that they have the ability to consent to medical treatment. Given the long-term consequences of the clinical interventions at issue in this case, and given that the treatment is as yet innovative and experimental, we recognise that clinicians may well regard these as cases where the authorisation of the court should be sought prior to commencing the clinical treatment.

== Reactions to the High Court judgment ==
A spokesperson for the Tavistock and Portman NHS Foundation Trust (the defendant in the suit) said it was disappointed in the decision and intended to appeal. Bell, one of the claimants, expressed approval of the judgment. Alistair Robertson, a solicitor who advised Tavistock and Portman NHS Foundation Trust in the appeal said "We were disappointed with the Divisional Court's judgment. Despite making no finding of unlawfulness, the court still made a declaration of what, precisely, a child had to be able to weigh up before consenting to treatment with puberty blockers, and gave very strong 'guidance' on whether children in particular age groups would be able to give such consent."

The UK human rights groups Amnesty International UK and Liberty issued a joint statement expressing disappointment in the judgment and concern "not only for what this means for the health and well-being of trans young people, but the wider implications this will have on the rights of children and young people of all genders, particularly on consent and bodily autonomy." Mermaids, a UK charity for gender-variant and trans youth, described the ruling as a "potentially devastating blow to trans under-16s", and a "betrayal of trans young people".

In the immediate aftermath of the judgment, there were many reports of existing patients at GIDS having their treatment abruptly cut off, and that even care for patients over the age of 16 was being affected. Stonewall, Mermaids, and Gendered Intelligence conducted an online survey of over 200 parents whose children were being seen at Tavistock, on the waiting list, or considering a referral to gauge their responses to the ruling. They found that it negatively impacted mental health and education experiences. More than two thirds of respondents said they were likely to pursue other less secure pathways to treatment.

The World Professional Association for Transgender Health and European, Asian, Australian, Aotorean, United States, and Canadian Professional Associations for Transgender Health released a statement in response to the ruling that "We are gravely concerned that the ruling will have a significantly adverse impact upon gender diverse youth and their families by imposing barriers to care that are costly, needlessly intimidating, and inherently discriminatory" and recommended "that capacity to consent is evaluated on a case-by-case basis by the treating clinician and not by a court of law."

Sandra Duffy, writing in Irish Legal News said "Through the declaration and guidance issued in the [High Court] judgment, it set a near-impossibly high standard for competence to consent, including a requirement to understand the effects of cross-sex hormones – a treatment which is only prescribed to adults."

== Appeal ==
Leave to appeal against the decision of the High Court was granted in January 2021. The appeal was heard on 23 and 24 June 2021 by Lord Burnett of Maldon (Lord Chief Justice), Sir Geoffrey Vos (Master of the Rolls) and Dame Eleanor King (Lady Justice of Appeal), and judgment was given on Friday 17 September.

The original decision was overturned by the Court of Appeal and the guidance on puberty blockers was quashed. The Court of Appeal ruled that the High Court should not have issued guidance on the Gillick test and puberty blockers because that court should have dismissed the case when it ruled that the Tavistock guidance was lawful. The Court of Appeal found that it was "for clinicians to exercise their judgement" in relation to puberty blocking treatment.

The Supreme Court of the United Kingdom refused Bell's application for permission to appeal on 28 April 2022, with the reason that it did "not raise an arguable point of law".

== Reactions to the Court of Appeal judgment ==
Alistair Robertson, a solicitor who advised the Tavistock and Portman NHS Foundation Trust, said going into the appeal "Our strategy had to be to focus the courts on the specific legal issues raised and away from the moral controversy around the treatment of children for gender dysphoria."

Following the appeal Helen Marshall, Chief Executive of Brook, one of the appellants against the original ruling, expressed delight with the appeal judgment and said "By confirming that clinicians are able to use their professional judgement to evaluate an individual young person's capacity to consent to the use of puberty blockers, today's judgment crucially upholds the principle of Gillick competence which underpins practice across health, social care and many other areas of work with young people."

Describing the appeal judgment, Sandra Duffy of Irish Legal News said "The Court of Appeal disagreed profoundly with the findings of the Divisional [High] Court on both evidentiary and legal bases. Its decision to overturn found that the Divisional Court had relied on flawed expert evidence, 'implied factual findings that the Divisional Court was not equipped to make', and was incorrect in issuing both its declaration of law and its guidance on the application" (citations omitted) and highlighted the importance of "the Court of Appeal's finding that Gillick competence applies to puberty blockers in the same way that it would to any other medical decision".

Marina Wheeler QC, reacting to the appeal judgment, said "In essence, the Court of Appeal found that the judges below [in the High Court] had stepped into the shoes of clinicians: it is 'for doctors to decide on competence not judges'", adding: "As figures before the Court show, treatment for gender dysphoria among children is increasing: in 2009 there were 97 referrals to the Tavistock clinic; in 2019 there were 2,519. Given these figures, Ms Bell is unlikely to be the only young person who has changed their mind about treatment. If this is right, a clinical negligence claim is just a matter of time. Unlike proceedings for judicial review, that will provide a forum where the court is required to make factual findings, form judgments about clinical practice, and resolve disputes between experts. On that occasion, the judges will have to decide."

In July 2022, the NHS decided to close GIDS (the Tavistock Clinic) and replace it with regional healthcare centres in 2023, following the release of an interim version of the Cass Review, a report conducted by paediatrician Hilary Cass.

== AB v CD and others ==
AB v CD and others is a separate case involving the Tavistock & Portman NHS Foundation Trust, on the related matter of whether parents can give legal consent to their child receiving puberty blockers. In a judgment issued on 26 March 2021, the High Court ruled that parents are able to give such consent "save where the parents are seeking to override the decision of the child" [para 114 of the judgment]. The case does not overrule, nor have any legal effect on, the judgment in Bell v Tavistock; the ruling reads [para 9] "Nothing that is said below is intended to depart, to even the smallest extent, from anything that was said in Bell."

== Subsequent legal move by Keira Bell ==
In January 2025, it was reported that Keira Bell's lawyers had written to the Health Secretary, Wes Streeting, saying that unless he banned the use of cross-sex hormones for those under 18, they would challenge by judicial review his decision to allow their use by private clinics.

== Summary of judgments ==
Court	Judge	Puberty blockers?	Date
Administrative (England) (Wales)	Dame Victoria Sharp (PQBD)	Under-16s cannot consent	1 December 2020
Administrative (England) (Wales)	Lord Justice Lewis	Under-16s cannot consent	1 December 2020
Administrative (England) (Wales)	Mrs Justice Lieven	Under-16s cannot consent	1 December 2020
Appeal (England) (Wales)	Lord Burnett of Maldon (LCJ)	Under-16s can consent	17 September 2021
Appeal (England) (Wales)	Sir Geoffrey Vos (MR)	Under-16s can consent	17 September 2021
Appeal (England) (Wales)	Lady Justice King	Under-16s can consent	17 September 2021

== See also ==
- Cass Review
- Varian v Einhorn
