= Detransition =

Cessation or reversal of gender transition

Detransition is the cessation or reversal of a transgender identification or of gender transition, temporarily or permanently, through social, legal, or medical means. This process may be based on a number of reasons, including a shift in gender identity, health concerns, social or economic pressure such as trans healthcare bans, discrimination, stigma, political beliefs, or religious beliefs. The estimated prevalence of detransition varies depending on definitions and methodology but is generally found to be rare.

Some studies use the term retransition rather than detransition, but the term is more commonly used to describe the resumption of transition or transgender identity following a detransition. Some organizations with ties to conversion therapy have used detransition narratives to push transphobic rhetoric and legislation.

== Background and terminology ==
Gender transition, often shortened to just transition, is the process of a transgender person changing their gender expression or sex characteristics to accord with their internal sense of gender identity. Methods of transition vary from person to person, but the process commonly involves social changes (such as clothing, personal name, and pronouns), legal changes (such as changes in legal name and legal gender), and medical/physical changes (such as hormone replacement therapy and gender-affirming surgery).

Detransition is the process of halting or reversing social, medical, or legal aspects of a gender transition, partially or completely. It can be temporary or permanent. Detransition and regret over transition are often erroneously conflated, though there are cases of detransition without regret and regret without detransition. The terms "primary detransition" and "detransition with identity desistance" have been used to describe those who cease to identify as transgender, while "secondary detransition" and "detransition without identity desistance" are used for those who continue to identify as transgender. Retransition is sometimes used as a synonym for detransition but more commonly refers to restarting or resuming a stopped or reversed gender transition. Those who undergo detransition are commonly called detransitioners or detrans.

Desistance has been commonly used in research literature but is poorly defined. It is commonly used to refer to children whose gender dysphoria subsides or who cease to identify as transgender during puberty. These definitions are often conflated. The definitions are primarily used to claim that transgender children who desist will identify as cisgender after puberty, based on biased research from the 1960s to 1980s and poor-quality research in the 2000s. It is sometimes used to refer to adults who ceased identifying as transgender prior to medically transitioning.

The term detransition is controversial within the transgender community. According to Turban et al., this is because, as with the word transition, it carries an "incorrect implication that gender identity is contingent upon gender affirmation processes". The term has become associated with movements that aim to restrict the access of transgender people to transition-related healthcare by over-emphasizing the risk of regret and detransition.

== Occurrence ==
Detransition has been heterogeneously defined in the literature, but available estimates indicate detransition is rare. Advocates for Trans Equality's 2015 U.S. Transgender Survey (a cross-sectional nonprobability survey of transgender adults) reported a history of detransition in 13% of those who had pursued broadly-defined gender affirmation.

A review in 2024 analyzed detransition among those who received puberty blockers or cross-sex hormones. It found the studies used heterogenous methodologies and definitions of the term, with small time frames, low participation, and lack of consideration for patient-level data and confounding factors. The majority of studies were small cohorts from specialized gender clinics or were limited to pediatric/adolescent ages. Most were from the Netherlands, the United States, the United Kingdom and Denmark. It gave point-prevalence proportions of 1.6–9.8% for discontinuation of cross-sex hormone and 1–7.6% for discontinuation of puberty blockers among the transgender population. The review noted that the "current literature shows that the decision to detransition appears to be rare" and stated that estimates of those who detransition due to a change in identity are likely overinflated due to conflation between a change in identity and other reasons for discontinuation reported such as "financial barriers, side effects, poor compliance, social issues or goals of treatment met".

=== Reasons ===
Reasons for detransition vary and may include internal factors such as a changed understanding of their gender identity, regret, physical health concerns or side-effects, or remission of gender dysphoria, or having met the goals of treatment. External factors include financial or legal issues, social and familial stigma and discrimination, difficulty accessing medical treatment, or cultural and ideological pressures. Some people detransition on a temporary basis, in order to accomplish a particular aim, such as having biologically related children, or until barriers to transition have been resolved or removed. Transgender elders may also detransition out of concern for whether they can receive adequate or respectful care in later life.

The National Center for Transgender Equality conducted a survey of individuals who currently identified as transgender. The results published in the 2015 U.S. Transgender Survey found that 8% of respondents reported having ever detransitioned; 62% of that group reported having subsequently retransitioned. 33% reported detransitioning because it was too difficult, 31% due to discrimination, and 29% due to difficulty getting a job. Others reported the reason as being pressure from parents (about 36%), family members (26%), spouses (18%), and employers (17%).

A mixed-methods analysis of the survey's data published in 2021 found that the vast majority said detransition was in part due to external factors, such as pressure from family, sexual assault, and nonaffirming school environments; another highly cited factor was "it was just too hard for me."

==== Forced medical detransition ====
Some state legislatures in the United States have enacted or sought to enact laws which would force transgender people who were unable to flee to medically detransition by criminalizing or restricting their access to care. Arkansas was the first US state to ban transgender healthcare for minors, with the age limit being increased to 26 by August 2024. States have also sought to ban such care for those under 26, restrict access for all ages, or limit public and private insurance coverage of it. In 2024, over 112 bills in 40 states proposed bans on trans healthcare for minors. A study by the Williams Institute found that approximately 114,000 transgender minors lived in states which banned transgender healthcare, and approximately 240,000 transgender minors lived in states that banned it or proposed banning it in 2024.

In May 2024, leaked documents from the British National Health Service (NHS) suggested said that transgender youth who received gender-affirming care from unregulated or overseas advisors could be forced to choose between medical detransition or being subject to safeguarding referrals and investigations. The documents called for the approximately 6,000 youth on the waiting list for NHS gender-affirming care to be interviewed and advised per the recommendations of the Cass Review not to receive gender-affirming care obtained via routes without "appropriate care", and if they were found to disregard the advice in a way the provider considers to put them "at increased risk", then to make safeguarding referrals.

Transgender prisoners are often forcibly detransitioned in many state and federal prisons within the US. Transgender prisoners have been subject to the same in the UK.

On March 12, 2023, a Saudi trans woman named Eden Knight died by suicide after being forcefully detransitioned. Knight wrote in a suicide note that her parents had hired an American private intelligence firm and a Saudi lawyer to relocate and forcibly socially and medically detransition her. After becoming dependent on the lawyer for food and shelter and fearing he would report her to U.S. immigration authorities, Knight wrote that she returned to her parents in Saudi Arabia. She secretly continued feminizing hormone replacement therapy, but after being found out twice she died by suicide.

=== Clinical pathway ===
As of 2023, there were no clinical guidelines for detransition. The World Professional Association for Transgender Health's 8th edition of its Standards of Care recommended that "health care professionals assessing adults who wish to detransition and seek gender-related hormone intervention, surgical intervention, or both, utilize a comprehensive multidisciplinary assessment that will include additional viewpoints from experienced health care professional in transgender health and that considers, together with the individual, the role of social transition as part of the assessment process".

In August 2024, following recommendations in the Cass Review, NHS England announced plans for the first NHS service to support patients wishing to detransition. They said: "There is no defined clinical pathway in the NHS for individuals who are considering detransition. NHS England will establish a programme of work to explore the issues around a detransition pathway by October 2024."

In May 2026, Texas Children's Hospital agreed to establish a detransition clinic as part of a settlement with the Texas Attorney General. News reports described it as the first dedicated detransition clinic in the United States.

== Cultural and political impact ==
Controversy surrounding detransition within trans activism primarily arises from how the subject is framed as a subject of moral panic in mainstream media and right-wing politics. Detransition has attracted interest from both social conservatives and gender-critical feminists on the political right. Activists on the right have been accused of using detransitioners' stories to further their work against trans rights. Some gender-critical feminists see detransitioners' experiences as further proof of patriarchal enforcement of gender roles and medicalized erasure of gays and lesbians. Other feminists have expressed disagreement with this opinion, referring to those who hold these beliefs as trans-exclusionary radical feminists (TERFs). This attention has elicited in detransitioners mixed feelings of both exploitation and support.

In 2017, the Mazzoni Center's Philadelphia Trans Health Conference, which is an annual meeting of transgender people, advocates, and healthcare providers, canceled two panel discussions on detransition and alternate methods of working with gender dysphoria. The conference organizers said, "When a topic becomes controversial, such as this one has turned on social media, there is a duty to make sure that the debate does not get out of control at the conference itself. After several days of considerations and reviewing feedback, the planning committee voted that the workshops, while valid, cannot be presented at the conference as planned."

Many ex-gay and Christian Right affiliated organizations also promote programs aiming to discourage transition and promote reversal or desistence of transition. A key characteristic of these organizations are the construction of "transgenderism" as a sin against God or the natural order. In the 1970s, Exodus International platformed Perry Desmond, an "ex-transsexual" who evangelized throughout the US and supported Anita Bryant's Save Our Children campaign. Another prominent characteristic is ex-transgender testimonials, which depict "the transgender lifestyle" as destructive as opposed to contemplation of God and encourage other transgender people to join them. These organizations portray "gender ideology" and "transgender ideology" as a social contagion threatening to the natural order.

Ky Schevers, an "ex-detransitioner" whose detransition was prominently profiled by Katie Herzog and The Outline, spoke about her experiences in a community of gender-critical feminist detransitioned women, drawing parallels to the ex-gay movement and conversion therapy. Parallels drawn include suppressing rather than addressing or removing the underlying dysphoria, stating that not only their gender dysphoria but everyone's dysphoria was a result of internalized sexism and trauma, and language from the twelve-step program being used to describe the desire to transition.

Schevers said that during the Bell v Tavistock ruling, her lawyer had connections to the right-wing and anti-LGBT-rights organization the Alliance Defending Freedom, which she described as pushing most of the anti-trans bills in the United States. Schevers later created Health Liberation Now! alongside Lee Leveille, who had also previously been involved in detransition communities that were transphobic, to "give voice to folks who have complicated experiences with transition or detransition, retransition and shifting senses of self that goes beyond a lot of the TERFy areas that people are inevitably getting funnelled into". The group has reported on conversion therapy practices and maintains resources to help identify relationships between clinical conversion therapists and astroturfed campaigns led by anti-trans groups.

=== Litigation ===
Some individuals who later detransitioned have filed lawsuits against healthcare providers, alleging medical malpractice due to improper mental health evaluations.

Bell v Tavistock was a legal case brought by a detransitioner (Bell) and decided by the Court of Appeal (England and Wales) in 2021 on whether puberty blockers could be prescribed to children under 18 without prior court approval. The High Court (Administrative Court) ruling, which was overturned on appeal, said that doctors of teens under the age of 18 may need to get authorization from the courts prior to prescribing puberty blockers. The Court of Appeal overturned the decision stating "it was for clinicians rather than the court to decide on competence" to consent to receive puberty blockers.

The first case of a medical malpractice lawsuit by someone who detransitioned in the United States that went to a jury trial and won was Varian v Einhorn. Fox Varian, who transitioned at 16, was awarded $2 million by in her case against her psychologist and the surgeon who performed top surgery on her due to them breaching the accepted standard of care. Both parties in the case stressed that the case was not about whether gender-affirming care itself is medical malpractice or whether gender-affirming surgery was appropriate for minors. The jury was also not asked to decide the legitimacy of such care. Rather, the lawsuit and trial narrowly focused on whether Einhorn and Chin had followed the accepted guidelines for such care while treating Varian specifically. According to The New York Times, the lawyer who represented Varian sought to downplay the significance of the verdict, stating "This was never a debate over the legitimacy of gender-affirming care... It was about whether medical professionals met the standards that covered their own profession.” Dr. Schechter, the president-elect of the World Professional Association for Transgender Health (WPATH) testified that the initial treatment was based on "assumption and inference" and that the health providers failed to follow the standard of care their organization has sought to promulgate.

== See also ==
- Healthcare and the LGBT community
- LGBT rights by country or territory
- LGBT social movements
