= World Professional Association for Transgender Health =

- Abbreviation: WPATH
- Formation: September 1979; 47 years ago
- Type: NGO
- Tax ID no.: 94-2675140
- Legal status: 501(c)(3)
- Purpose: To promote evidence-based care, education, research, advocacy, public policy, and respect in transgender health
- Headquarters: East Dundee, Illinois, U.S.
- Products: Standards of Care for the Health of Transgender and Gender Diverse People
- Members: 2,700 (2021)
- President: Asa Radix
- President-elect: Loren Schechter
- Secretary: Chris McLachlach
- Treasurer: Stephen Rosenthal
- Revenue: $1,245,915 (2016)
- Expenses: $1,144,284 (2016)
- Employees: 0 (2016)
- Website: www.wpath.org
- Formerly called: Harry Benjamin International Gender Dysphoria Association

The World Professional Association for Transgender Health (WPATH), formerly the Harry Benjamin International Gender Dysphoria Association (HBIGDA), is a professional organization focused on understanding and treatment of gender incongruence and gender dysphoria, and creating standardized treatment for transgender and gender variant people. WPATH was founded in 1979 and named HBIGDA in honor of one of its founders, Harry Benjamin, during a period when there was no clinical consensus on how and when to provide gender-affirming care.

WPATH is mostly known for the Standards of Care for the Health of Transgender and Gender Diverse People (SOC). Early versions of the SOC mandated strict gatekeeping of transition by psychologists and psychiatrists and framed transgender identity as a mental illness. Beginning in approximately 2010, WPATH began publicly advocating the depsychopathologization of transgender identities, and the seventh and eighth versions of the SOC took an approach that was more evidence-based.

== Standards of Care ==
WPATH develops, publishes, and reviews guidelines for persons with gender dysphoria, under the name Standards of Care for the Health of Transgender and Gender Diverse People (SOC). The overall goal of the SOC is to provide clinical guidance for health professionals to assist transgender and gender-nonconforming people with safe and effective pathways to achieving lasting personal comfort with their gendered selves, in order to maximize their overall health, psychological well-being, and self-fulfillment. To keep up with increasing scientific evidence, WPATH periodically commissions an update to the SOC, and the WPATH Guideline Steering Committee oversees the guideline development process. The first version of the SOC was published in 1979. Updates were released in 1980 (2nd), 1981 (3rd), 1990 (4th), 1998 (5th), 2001 (6th), and 2012 (7th). WPATH published the latest edition (the 8th) in 2022; it is described as being based upon a "more rigorous and methodological evidence-based approach than previous versions".

The SOC is an internationally accepted and influential document outlining how to provide patients with transition-related care. Early versions focused gender transition towards psychologists and psychiatrists and framed transgender identity as a mental illness. Beginning in approximately 2010, with a push from trans rights activists, WPATH began publicly advocating the depsychopathologization of transgender identities in the 7th version of the SOC.

== History ==
=== Background ===
Medical treatment for gender dysphoria was publicized in the early 1950s by accounts such as those of Christine Jorgensen. During this period, the majority of literature on gender diversity was pathologizing, positing dysfunctional families as the causes of dysphoria and recommending reparative therapy and psychoanalysis, such as Robert Stoller's work. Others, such as George Rekers and Ole Ivar Lovaas, recommended behavioral treatments to extinguish cross-sex identification and reinforce gender-normative behaviors. Knowledge on various aspects of transition-related care had existed for decades, but there was no clinical consensus on care pathways for transgender people.

In 1966, Harry Benjamin published The Transsexual Phenomenon, arguing that since there was no cure for transsexualism, it was in the best interests of transsexuals and society to aid in sex reassignment. In the same year, the Johns Hopkins Gender Clinic was opened by John Money. In 1969, Reed Erickson, a wealthy transgender man who played a large role in funding research and clinics for trans healthcare through the Erickson Educational Foundation, funded Richard Green and Money's book Transsexualism and Sex Reassignment, a multidisciplinary volume exploring instructions on medical care as well as social and clinical aspects, which was dedicated to Benjamin. The same year, Erickson funded the first International Symposium on Gender Identity in London. The fourth conference, taking place in 1975, was the first to use Benjamin's name in its title.

=== 1979–2000 ===
The Harry Benjamin International Gender Dysphoria Association and Standards of Care (SOC) were conceived during the fifth International Gender Dysphoria Symposium (IGDS), in 1977. The organization supported a mix of psychological and medical treatment. The founding committee was entirely American and consisted of Jack Berger, Richard Green, Donald R. Laub, Charles Reynolds Jr., Paul A. Walker, Leo Wollman, and transgender activist Jude Patton, with Walker serving as president. The organization was legally incorporated in 1979.

The initial SOC, The hormonal and surgical sex reassignment of gender dysphoric persons, were published in 1979 and served both as clinical guidelines for treating patients and to protect those who provided the treatments. Versions 2, 3, and 4 of the SOC were published in 1980, 1981, and 1990, respectively, under the same name, with few changes. These versions of the SOC followed the gatekeeping model laid out by Benjamin, requiring evaluations from separate mental health professionals as well as compulsory psychotherapy. WPATH played a large role in the addition of "Gender Identity Disorder" to the DSM-III, in 1980. These versions used the DSM-III's criteria for the diagnoses of "transsexualism" and "gender identity disorder of childhood", which had largely been authored by Richard Green. This led to feedback loops in research, where the diagnostic criteria were thought correct since transgender people provided the narratives expected of them in order to access care.

In the 1990s, WPATH struggled to operate due to criticisms of their SOC from within the trans community, such as the requirement of a real-life test (RLT), according to which patients had to socially transition for up to a year prior to receiving hormone therapy. These critiques developed into a trans-led Advocacy and Liaison committee, marking the first time trans people were officially and actively consulted regarding their treatment. The fifth version of the SOC, published in 1998, was titled the "Standards of Care for Gender Identity Disorders", to be consistent with the DSM-III. It recommended but did not require psychotherapy and stated that while GID was a mental disorder, that was not a license for stigma.

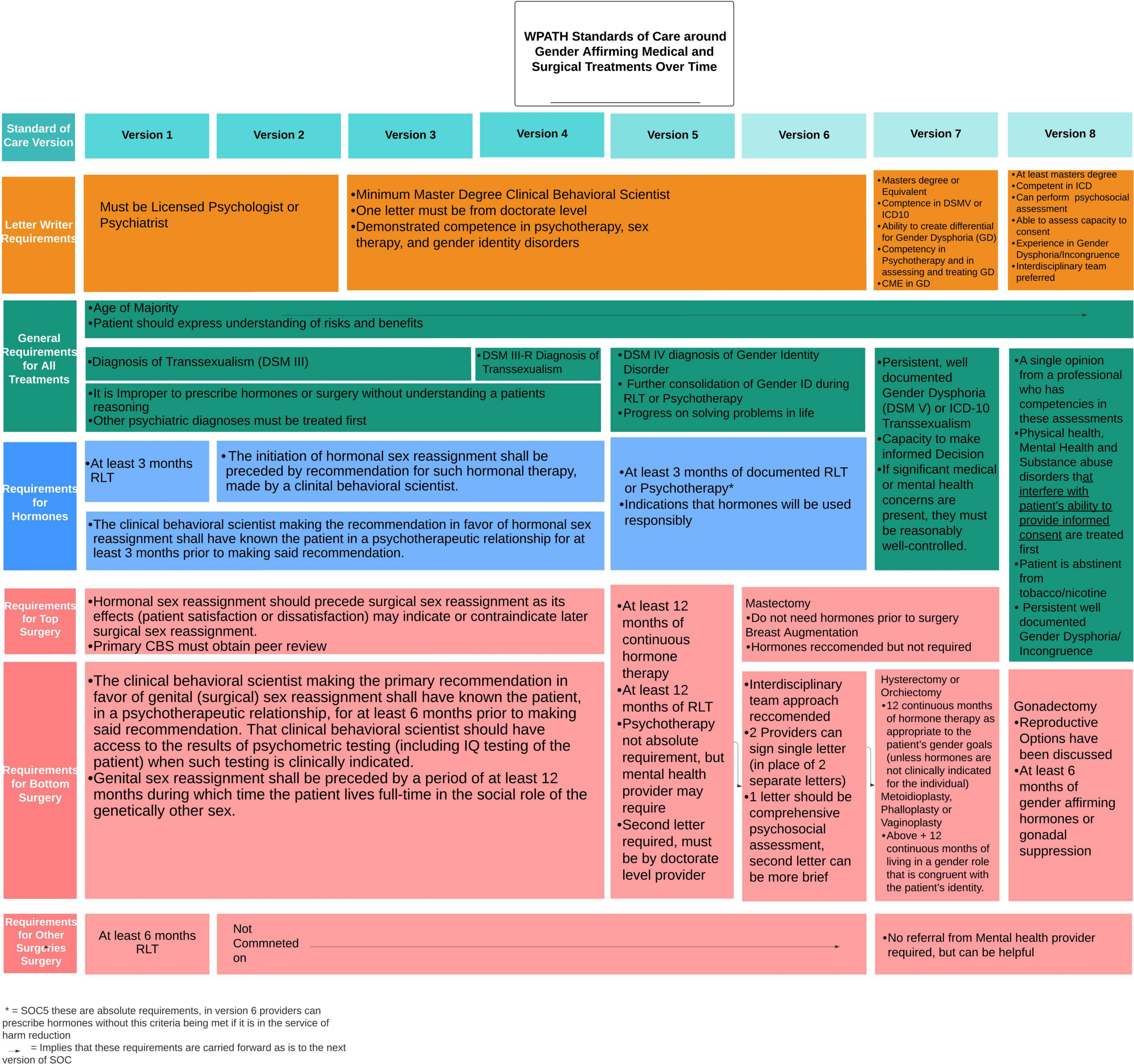
Changes to the World Professional Association for Transgender Health (WPATH) standards of care around gender-affirming medical and surgical treatments over time

=== 2001–present ===
The SOC 6 was published in 2001 and offered more flexibility and individualized care but continued to use the phrase "gender identity disorder". At the same time, transgender people increasingly complained of having to "jump through hoops". SOC 6 also did not include significant changes to the tasks mental health professionals were required to take or in the general recommendations for content of the letters of readiness. An important change in the eligibility criteria for hormone therapy allowed providers to prescribe hormones even if patients had not undergone RLT or psychotherapy if it was for harm-reduction purposes. A notable change in version six separated the eligibility and readiness criteria for top and bottom surgery, allowing some patients, particularly individuals born female, to receive a mastectomy.

In 2006, the organization changed its name from the Harry Benjamin International Gender Dysphoria Association to the World Professional Association for Transgender Health (WPATH). In 2007, Stephen Whittle became the first transgender president of the organization.

In 2010, WPATH published the "depath statement", urging the "depsychopathologisation of gender variance worldwide" by governments and medical bodies. Shortly after, it released the "Identity Recognition Statement", urging governmental and medical bodies to endorse gender self-identification and no longer require surgery or sterilization as a prerequisite.

The SOC 7, published in 2011, was more evidence-based than the previous versions and the first to include an international advisory committee of transgender community leaders. It changed the name to the "Standards of Care for the Health of Transsexual, Transgender, and Gender-Nonconforming People", began to use the phrase "gender dysphoria", and marked a shift from conceiving gender as a binary to a spectrum. Differences between the sixth and seventh versions were significant, with the latter one including gender-affirming care in female-to-male persons.

The updated SOC also made significant departures from previous versions, such as being the first version to include references, changes in guidelines so that not everyone with gender concerns required a diagnosis, replacing the requirement of the real-life test and psychotherapy prior to hormone treatment or surgery with "persistent well-documented gender dysphoria", criteria for hysterectomy or orchiectomy treatment, and an expansion of the effects of hormone therapy. WPATH acknowledged the importance and changes in the seventh SOC, saying that "Changes in this version are based upon significant cultural shifts, advances in clinical knowledge, and appreciation of the many health care issues that can arise for transsexual, transgender, and gender nonconforming people beyond hormone therapy and surgery".

In 2022, the current edition, Standards of Care 8, was published. The guidelines note that the complexity of the assessment process may differ from patient to patient, based on the type of gender-affirming care requested and the specific characteristics of the patient. The updates to the SOC shifted the ethical focus of evaluations toward one of shared decision-making and informed consent by removing the need for a second letter from a mental health professional and adding the requirement that the provider must have a doctoral-level degree. The new edition introduced the term gender incongruence and dealt with the treatment of adolescents. WPATH commissioned a series of reviews to support the development of SOC 8 from various research organizations and retained the publishing rights to the contracted research to support the guidelines, which were developed by a multidisciplinary committee of experts, building on previous versions and using the Delphi method.

According to The New York Times, the legal proceedings leading up to the Supreme Court case of United States v. Skrmetti revealed that WPATH "had itself allowed politics to dictate some of its recommendations". The Times reported that pressure from Rachel Levine, then a federal government official, was "instrumental", and caused "furious debate" within WPATH. For example, Levine argued, in relation to age minimums, that "specific listings of ages, under 18, will result in devastating legislation for trans care"; this was then relayed by the group's president. The American Academy of Pediatrics also said they would oppose SOC 8 if age minimums were not deleted. Shortly after the release of SOC 8, age minimums for hormonal treatments and for most gender-related surgeries were deleted. Internally, clinicians with WPATH also argued for the avoidance of phrases like "insufficient evidence" and "limited data" in favor of using terminology like "medical necessity" and "evidence based", citing ongoing court battles to restrict gender-affirming care and the effect such language could have on them.

In February 2026, WPATH filed a lawsuit against the Trump administration's Federal Trade Commission (FTC) in the D.C. District Court. WPATH alleged that the FTC, which had been investigating the organization as well as the Endocrine Society, was not engaged in consumer protection but rather intimidation and chilling of speech related to transgender health care. In May, Judge James Boasberg granted the preliminary injunctions requested by both organizations, ruling that the investigations were likely motivated by "hostility" and animus toward gender-affirming care. On June 17, 2026, the FTC and the states of Alaska, Iowa, Nebraska, and Texas sued WPATH, alleging that it made deceptive or unsubstantiated claims.

== Organization ==
=== Membership ===
Professionals within WPATH include anyone working in disciplines such as medicine, psychology, law, social work, counseling, psychotherapy, family studies, sociology, anthropology, speech and voice therapy, and sexology. Non-professionals may also join, paying the same membership fee, but without receiving voting privileges. The organization is funded by its membership and by donations and grants from non-commercial sources. The president of the organization is Asa Radix, who replaced Marci Bowers in October 2024.

=== Regional organizations ===
WPATH is affiliated with several regional organizations to inform local guidance in their respective areas of the world.

- Asian Professional Association for Transgender Health (AsiaPATH)
- Australian Professional Association for Trans Health (AusPATH)
- European Professional Association for Transgender Health (EPATH)
- United States Professional Association for Transgender Health (USPATH)
- Professional Association for Transgender Health Aotearoa (PATHA), serving New Zealand
- Canadian Professional Association for Transgender Health (CPATH)
- Professional Association for Transgender Health South Africa (PATHSA)
- Indian Professional Association for Transgender Health (IPATH)

=== TPATH ===
The Transgender Professional Association for Transgender Health is a global transgender healthcare organization that specifically represents the transgender healthcare providers in and outside of WPATH and its regional organizations. It is wholly independent and not formally affiliated with WPATH or its' regional offshoots.
