= Feminist views on transgender topics =

Feminist views on transgender topics vary widely. Third- and fourth-wave feminists tend to view trans rights as an integral part of intersectional feminism. Former president of the American National Organization for Women (NOW) Terry O'Neill has stated that the struggle against transphobia is a feminist issue, with NOW affirming that "trans women are women, trans girls are girls." Several studies have found that individuals who identify as feminists tend to be more accepting of trans people than those who do not.

Trans-exclusionary radical feminism holds that womanhood is defined on the axis of sex, and thus asserts that trans women are not women and that trans men are not men. The movement opposes trans rights and rejects the concept of transgender identities. These views have frequently been described as transphobic by other feminists.

Authors including Julia Serano and Emi Koyama have founded a stream within feminism called transfeminism, which views the struggle for the rights of trans people and trans women in particular as an integral part of the feminist struggle for all women's rights.

== History ==
=== 1700s to early 1900s ===
Late 18th-century English feminists Mary Wollstonecraft and Mary Robinson referenced the Chevalier d'Éon as an example of an inspiring woman.

In 1866, anti-rape activist Frances Thompson became the first transgender woman to testify before the United States Congress when she testified about the abuse Black women faced during the Memphis massacre of 1866.

In 1919, the German Weimar Republic–era Institut für Sexualwissenschaft, a sexuality advocacy and research institution, was founded in Berlin. As well as advocating for women's emancipation, sex education, and access to contraception, the institute prominently endorsed LGBT rights and oversaw the development of several advances in trans healthcare, including coining the term "transsexualism" and performing gender-affirming surgery. Institute founder Magnus Hirschfeld's closest collaborator in the feminist movement was Helene Stöcker, whose Deutscher Bund für Mutterschutz und Sexualreform was directly affiliated with the institute. Both Hirschfeld and Stöcker viewed women's liberation as intertwined with that of gay and transgender people. Anarchist feminist Emma Goldman also spoke favourably of the institute's work, writing in one of her letters to Hirschfeld that it was "a tragedy ... that people of a different sexual type are caught in a world which shows so little understanding for homosexuals and is so crassly indifferent to the various gradations and variations of gender and their great significance in life." Soon after the Nazis took power in 1933, the institute was forcibly shut down, becoming the first large target of the Nazi book burnings.

=== Second wave (1970s–1980s) ===
In the late 1970s and early 1980s, corresponding roughly to the second wave of feminism, there were several notable clashes between feminists (especially early radical feminists) over the inclusion of trans women in feminist spaces.

A significant early dispute occurred in 1973 during a scheduled performance at the West Coast Lesbian Conference by transgender lesbian folk-singer and co-organiser of the event Beth Elliott. Elliott had previously served as vice-president of the San Francisco chapter of the lesbian group Daughters of Bilitis and edited the chapter's newsletter, Sisters, but had been expelled from the group the same year on a 35–28 vote on the grounds that she did not qualify as a woman. After a lesbian separatist group leafleted the conference against her presence, a vote was held among attendees on whether to allow her to remain, with over two-thirds voting in her favor. Despite the results of the vote, Elliott chose to leave after threats of further disruption were made. The following day of the event, Robin Morgan used her keynote speech to criticise Elliott, describing her as a "man" and "an opportunist, an infiltrator, and a destroyer – with the mentality of a rapist."

Later the same year, a conflict arose between Jean O'Leary, a founder of lesbian advocacy organization Lesbian Feminist Liberation, and Sylvia Rivera and Lee Brewster, after O'Leary said in a speech at the Christopher Street Liberation Day event: "we support the right of every person to dress in the way that she or he wishes. But we are opposed to the exploitation of women by men for entertainment or profit." O'Leary later regretted her stance against trans women and drag queens, saying that "looking back, I find this so embarrassing because my views have changed so much since then. I would never pick on a transvestite now." "It was horrible. How could I work to exclude transvestites and at the same time criticize the feminists who were doing their best back in those days to exclude lesbians?"

After a trans woman asked to join the Lesbian Organization of Toronto (LOOT) in 1978, the organization voted to exclude trans women. LOOT wrote: "A woman's voice was almost never heard as a woman's voice—it was always filtered through men's voices. So here a guy comes along saying, 'I'm going to be a girl now and speak for girls.' And we thought, 'No you're not.' A person cannot just join the oppressed by fiat."

Radical feminist Janice Raymond published The Transsexual Empire in 1979. In it, she criticised contemporary medical and psychiatric approaches to gender transition, arguing instead that "the problem of transsexualism would best be served by morally mandating it out of existence," and accused trans women of reinforcing traditional gender stereotypes. Several academics, researchers and writers characterized these views as transphobic and/or hate speech. Empire included a chapter criticising "the transsexually constructed lesbian-feminist", devoting a section to Sandy Stone, a trans woman who worked as a sound engineer for feminist record collective Olivia Records. The collective publicly defended Stone, but after continued pressure, including an incident where a trans-exclusionary group that issued death threats showed up to an Olivia event with guns, Stone resigned. Stone later wrote The Empire Strikes Back: A Posttranssexual Manifesto, a response to Raymond's Empire and a foundational work in the field of transgender studies.

Not all early radical feminists opposed trans acceptance. Andrea Dworkin, for example, viewed gender reassignment surgery as a right for transgender people. She wrote a letter to Raymond critical of The Transsexual Empire, which commented that of the transgender people she met in Europe (who she called a "small, vigorously persecuted minority"), she "perceived their suffering as authentic", and related their experiences to Jewish and female experiences. Dworkin said that it was a myth "that there are two polar distinct sexes".

The notion that human sex is not a naturally discrete binary, and that this conception is the result of gendered cultural and political processes, was later taken up and developed by authors like Anne Fausto-Sterling and Judith Butler. Concerning the oversight of the existence of these trans-inclusive radical feminist views, as well as of the role of trans women in the feminist struggle, historian Susan Stryker remarked that "transsexual women were active in the radical feminist movement of the late 1960s, but were almost entirely erased from its history after 1973."

=== Third wave (1990–2000s) ===
The third wave of feminism saw much greater acceptance of transgender rights, largely due to the influence of philosophers such as Kimberlé Crenshaw and Judith Butler, who argued for greater inclusion and examination of other developing fields (such as critical race theory and queer theory) within feminism. Butler in particular argued that women's liberation required a questioning of gender itself, and that accepting gay, trans, and gender-nonconforming people would promote this sort of questioning.

Other feminist authors like Cressida Heyes have embarked on projects of "finding grounds for solidarity" between trans and cisgender women, considering "woman" a family-resemblance concept rather than an essential or univocal one.

In the early 1990s, the Michigan Womyn's Music Festival (MichFest) ejected a transgender woman, Nancy Burkholder. From that point on, the festival maintained it was intended for "womyn-born womyn". The group Camp Trans formed to protest this policy and to advocate for greater acceptance of trans women in the feminist community. A number of prominent trans activists and feminists were involved in Camp Trans, including Riki Wilchins, Jessica Xavier, and Leslie Feinberg. MichFest considered allowing post-operative trans women to attend, but this was criticized as classist, as many trans women could not afford sex reassignment surgery. Lisa Vogel, MichFest's organizer, said protesters from Camp Trans engaged in vandalism. The festival ended in 2015.

=== Fourth wave (2010–present) ===
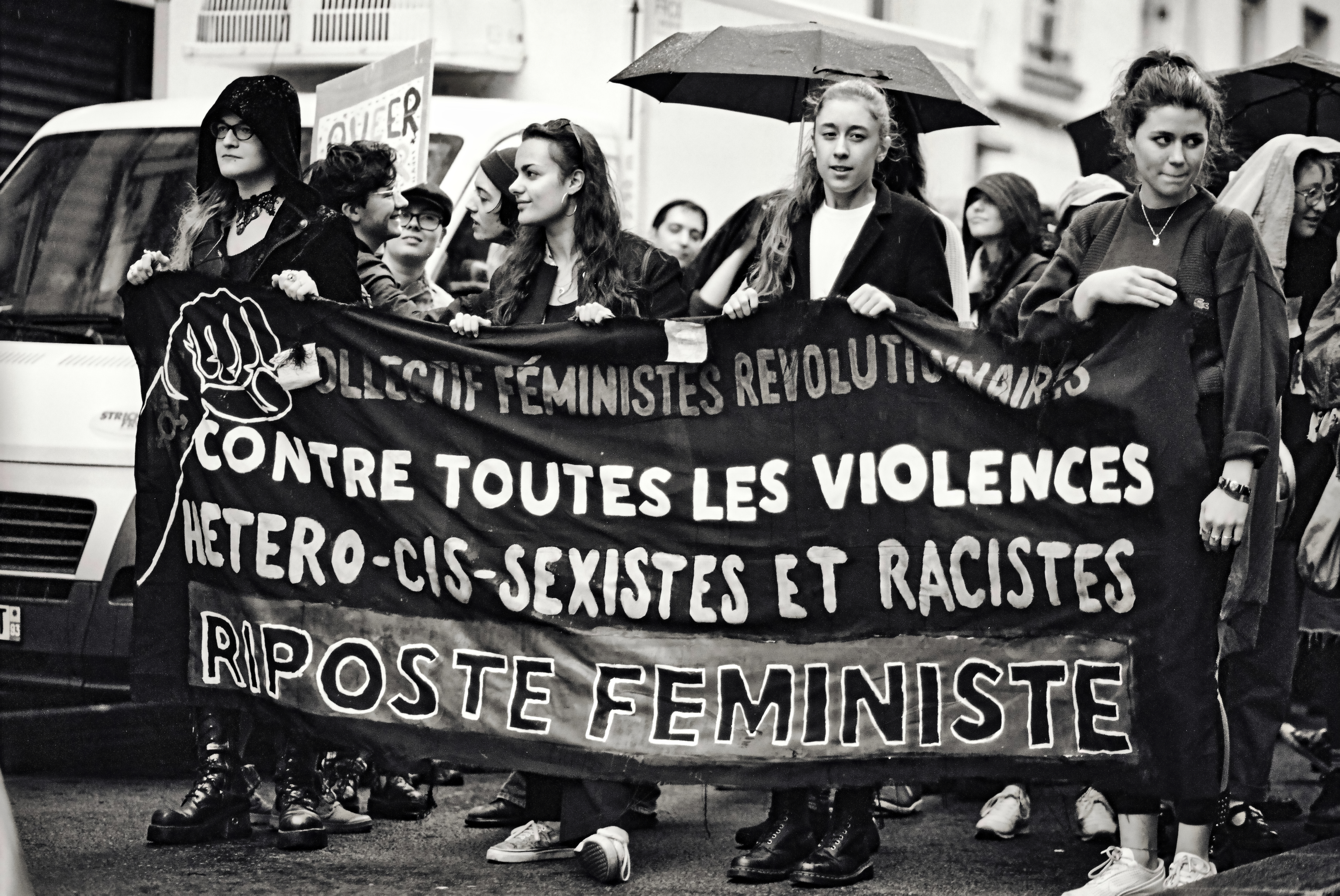
Trans march with banner reading "Collective feminist revolutionaries against all hetrocissexist and racist violence" from Paris, 2017

Many fourth-wave feminists are trans-inclusive. US organizations such as the National Organization for Women, the Feminist Majority Foundation, and Planned Parenthood support and advocate for trans rights, as do most Canadian feminist organizations and most African feminists. The influence of trans-exclusionary feminists has waned significantly, though they are still somewhat influential in some countries, including the United Kingdom.

== General perspectives on transgender rights ==
Queer feminist philosopher Judith Butler has argued for feminist solidarity with trans and gender-nonconforming people and has been critical of philosophers, such as Sheila Jeffreys, who they argue engage in attempts to dispute trans people's sense of identity. In a 2014 interview, Butler argued for civil rights for trans people: "[N]othing is more important for transgender people than to have access to excellent health care in trans-affirmative environments, to have the legal and institutional freedom to pursue their own lives as they wish, and to have their freedom and desire affirmed by the rest of the world." Butler also described criticisms of trans people by Jeffreys and Janice Raymond as "prescriptivism" and "tyranny". Butler stated trans people are not a product of medical discourse but rather develop new discourses through self-determination.

In 2012, Jeffreys wrote in The Guardian that she and other critics of "transgenderism" had been subjected to intimidation campaigns on the internet, suggesting that trans rights advocates feared criticism of "the practice of transgenderism."

In a 2009 paper in Hypatia: A Journal of Feminist Philosophy, Canadian feminist Viviane Namaste criticised "Anglo-American feminist theory" for relying on "transsexual women to ask its own epistemological questions", further arguing that the realities of trans lives were "chillingly absent from Anglo-American feminist theory and its framing of the Transgender Question" and the knowledge gained by that feminism consequently "has been of little benefit to transsexual women ourselves."

American academic Susan Stryker wrote in 2007 that first-wave feminism had commonalities with the transgender rights movement "[t]o the extent that breaking out of the conventional constrictions of womanhood is both a feminist and transgender practice". Stryker stated that transgender issues had led feminist scholars to question notions of biological sex and associated transgender theorizing with the rise of postmodern epistemology in third-wave feminist thought.

In a 2015 interview, radical feminist Catharine MacKinnon cited Simone de Beauvoir's quotation about "becom[ing] a woman" to say that "[a]nybody who identifies as a woman, wants to be a woman, is going around being a woman, as far as I'm concerned, is a woman". MacKinnon says that she has always seen "discrimination against trans people as a form of sex-based discrimination". In a 2022 lecture at Oxford University, MacKinnon continued to express her support for transfeminism and transgender sex equality, and criticized the postmodernism, liberalist anti-stereotyping approach, and anti-trans feminism. Her lecture was subsequently edited and published in the Yale Journal of Law & Feminism in 2023.

Australian sociologist Raewyn Connell has said that "the thought that the relationship between character and reproductive bodies might change has long been present in feminism," citing de Beauvoir as well as Mathilde Vaerting.

Lesbian feminist Sara Ahmed has said that an anti-trans stance is anti-feminist, and that trans feminism "recalls" earlier militant lesbian feminism.

Kimberlé Crenshaw wrote in favor of trans inclusion in intersectional feminism: "People of colour within LGBTQ movements; girls of colour in the fight against the school-to-prison pipeline; women within immigration movements; trans women within feminist movements; and people with disabilities fighting police abuse—all face vulnerabilities that reflect the intersections of racism, sexism, class oppression, transphobia, able-ism and more. Intersectionality has given many advocates a way to frame their circumstances and to fight for their visibility and inclusion."

== Particular topics ==
=== Colonialism ===
Argentine feminist Maria Lugones has argued that the gender binary is a colonial imposition that has been used to divide and subjugate people. Building on Lugones's work, Brooklyn Leo of Pennsylvania State University has argued that "the resistant-creative work of trans bodies of color liberates not just the folds of our own flesh from the Western gaze, but also sustains a new place of possibility for the cis accomplices who also refuse the privileges of the colonial/modern gender system."

In a 2020 paper in Feminist Criminology, Nishant Upadhyay of University of Colorado, Boulder argued that "transphobia is enmeshed in white feminism's colonial and white supremacist epistemological frameworks, and that their transphobia, in turn, continues to reproduce gender as a colonial myth" and that the "reduction of the category of 'woman' has been long challenged" by "Black, Indigenous, women of color, Third World, and transnational feminists for decades, if not centuries". In her book Me, Not You, Alison Phipps argues that "white feminism has a long history of policing the border" and that trans-exclusionary feminists "have much in common with conservatives who claim that increased immigration will result in increased rape".

=== Legal codification of gender ===
Caterina Nirta of Royal Holloway, University of London has argued that both trans people and feminists would benefit from abandoning "the categorical compartmentalisation of identity and spaces."

Commenting on Québec's Bill 2 in 2021, Florence Ashley of the University of Toronto has argued for the abolition of gender markers in legal documents, saying that they "help naturalize social categorizations based on gender" and pointing to historical research that found such markers were first introduced in France for the purposes of enforcing conscription, preventing queer couples from getting married, preventing gender diversity, and marking women as lessers under the law. Marie Draz of San Diego State University has argued that the "hegemonic account of gender as the organization of biological sex serves to obscure the role of racial and colonial domination and the differential allocation of gender across racial lines" and that legal gender classification serves as an "anchor point that reiterates the power of the state to classify and know its citizens."

=== Gender-affirming surgery ===
In her 1974 book Woman Hating: A Radical Look at Sexuality, radical feminist writer and activist Andrea Dworkin called for the support of transgender people, whom she viewed as "in a state of primary emergency" due to "the culture of male–female discreteness". She wrote: "every transsexual has the right to survival on his/her own terms. That means every transsexual is entitled to a sex-change operation, and it should be provided by the community as one of its functions." She also said that "transsexuality as we know it" might disappear within communities built on androgynous identity, as there would no longer be any gender roles to conform to.

In 1977, Gloria Steinem wrote that while she supported the right of individuals to identify as they choose, in many cases transgender people "surgically mutilate their own bodies" in order to conform to a gender role tied to physical body parts, concluding with the quote: "If the shoe doesn't fit, must we change the foot?" Although meant in the context of transgender issues, the quote is frequently misinterpreted as a general statement about feminism. The same year, she also expressed disapproval that the heavily publicized transition of tennis player Renée Richards (a trans woman) had been characterized as "a frightening instance of what feminism could lead to" or as "living proof that feminism isn't necessary", and wrote, "At a minimum, it was a diversion from the widespread problems of sexual inequality." Steinem's statements led to her being characterized as transphobic for some years. In a 2013 interview with The Advocate, she repudiated the interpretation of her text as an altogether condemnation of gender-affirming surgery, stating that her position was informed by accounts of gay men choosing to transition as a way of coping with societal homophobia. She added that she sees transgender people as living "authentic lives" that should be "celebrated".

Janice Raymond's The Transsexual Empire purported to examine the role of transgender identity in reinforcing traditional gender stereotypes, in particular the ways in which the "medical-psychiatric complex" was medicalizing gender identity, and the social and political context that contributed to the image of gender-affirming treatment and surgery as therapeutic medicine. Raymond maintained that this was based in the "patriarchal myths" of "male mothering", and "making of woman according to man's image", and that transgender identity aimed "to colonize feminist identification, culture, politics and sexuality." Several authors have since characterized this work as extremely transphobic and constituting hate speech, as well as lacking any serious intellectual basis.

In her own 1987 book Gyn/Ecology, Mary Daly, who had served as Raymond's thesis supervisor, argued that as gender-affirming surgery cannot reproduce female chromosomes or a female life history, it could "not produce women". Sheila Jeffreys and Germaine Greer have made similar remarks. In a response to related remarks by Elizabeth Grosz, philosopher Eva Hayward characterized this type of view as telling trans people who have had gender-affirming surgery: "Don't exist."

=== Pronouns ===
At the 1973 West Coast Lesbian Conference in Los Angeles, keynote speaker Robin Morgan stated that she would not refer to trans women with feminine pronouns, as transgender women, unlike her, had not experienced a lifetime as women and therefore could not understand the pain of cisgender women.

In Gender Hurts (2014), Sheila Jeffreys argues that using pronouns reflecting biological sex is important for feminists, as the feminine pronoun represents respect for cisgender women's historical subordination. She believes trans women cannot hold this status, as they have not experienced the same oppression, and using feminine pronouns for them masks their retained masculine privilege. In April 2015, radical feminist legal theorist Catharine A. MacKinnon responded, stating that Jeffreys' stance on pronouns is based on a nature-based moral view, which contradicts feminist achievements, especially from the political analysis of gender politics.

=== Socialization and experience ===
Some feminists argue that trans women cannot fully be women because they were assigned male at birth and have experienced some degree of male privilege. Radical feminists generally see gender as a system in which women are oppressed for reasons intrinsically related to their sex, and emphasize male violence against women, particularly involving institutions such as the sex industry, as central to women's oppression.

The sociologist Patricia Elliot argues that the view that one's socialization as a girl or woman defines "women's experience" assumes that women's experiences are homogeneous and discounts the possibility that trans and cis women may share the experience of being disparaged for their perceived femininity. Similarly, Transfeminist Manifesto author Emi Koyama contends that, while trans women may have experienced some male privilege before transitioning, trans women's experiences are also marked by disadvantages resulting from being trans.

In "Growing Up Trans: Socialization and the Gender Binary", Michelle Dietert and Dianne Dentice write that when youth embody non-standard gender roles or otherwise deviate from expectations of their assigned sex, the gender binary becomes a form of control by authorities, enforcing social norms upon them. In their view, this begins at early socialization, and transgender youth, especially gender-nonconforming children, often experience different treatment, leading to a fear of reprisals as they attempt to please their family and peers and navigate their understanding of their gender and societal expectations. They argue that socialization affects transgender youth differently, especially if they are gender-nonconforming.

Transfeminist Julia Serano has referred to implying that trans women may experience some degree of male privilege pre-transition as "denying [them] the closet", and has compared it to saying that a cisgender gay person experienced straight privilege before coming out. She has also compared it to if a cisgender girl was raised as a boy against her will, and how the two scenarios tend to be viewed differently by a cisgender audience, despite being ostensibly similar experiences from a transfeminine perspective. Finally, she has noted how the idea of "male socialization" or "male privilege" tend to be weaponized against transfems, an example being "if a trans woman gets upset, angry, or assertive, and someone attempts to pin that on her supposed "male privilege" — yet they would never have considered calling out those same behaviors if they thought that she was a cis woman".

In 2017, while discussing whether trans women are women, Chimamanda Ngozi Adichie said, "trans women are trans women." She acknowledged that transgender women face discrimination for being transgender and said she sees this as a serious issue, but also said, "we should not conflate the gender experiences of trans women with that of women born female." She later expanded on her comments, saying, "From the very beginning, I think it's been quite clear that there's no way I could possibly say that trans women are not women. It's the sort of thing to me that's obvious, so I start from that obvious premise. Of course they are women, but in talking about feminism and gender and all of that, it's important for us to acknowledge the differences in experience of gender. That's really what my point is. Had I said 'a cis woman is a cis woman, and a trans woman is a trans woman', I don't think I would get all the crap that I'm getting, but that's actually really what I was saying."

=== Transgender women in women's spaces and organizations ===
Laurel Westbrook and Kristin Schildt have argued that the gender that trans people are classed as by society can vary from space to space, with the spaces segregated according to strict interpretations of biology doing so to uphold the oppositeness of genders required for heterosexuality and gender binarism. Shannon Weber of Wellesley College has argued that "excluding transgender women from admission [to women's colleges] by virtue of biological determinism falls into the same types of anti-feminist ideologies that would historically bar all women from education based on assumptions about the meaning of their biology."

In 1996, Germaine Greer (at the time a fellow at Newnham College, Cambridge) unsuccessfully opposed the appointment to a fellowship of her transgender colleague Rachael Padman. Greer argued that because Padman had been assigned male at birth, she should not be admitted to Newnham, a women's college. Greer later resigned from Newnham.

A 2004 opinion piece by British radical feminist Julie Bindel titled "Gender Benders, beware" printed in The Guardian caused the paper to receive two hundred letters of complaint from transgender people, doctors, therapists, academics and others. The editorial expressed her anger at Kimberly Nixon and her views on transgender people. Transgender activist group Press for Change cite this article as an example of 'discriminatory writing' about transgender people in the press. Complaints focused on the title, "Gender benders, beware", the cartoon accompanying the piece, and the disparaging tone, such as "Think about a world inhabited just by transsexuals. It would look like the set of Grease" and "I don't have a problem with men disposing of their genitals, but it does not make them women, in the same way that shoving a bit of vacuum hose down your 501s [jeans] does not make you a man."

=== Transfeminism ===
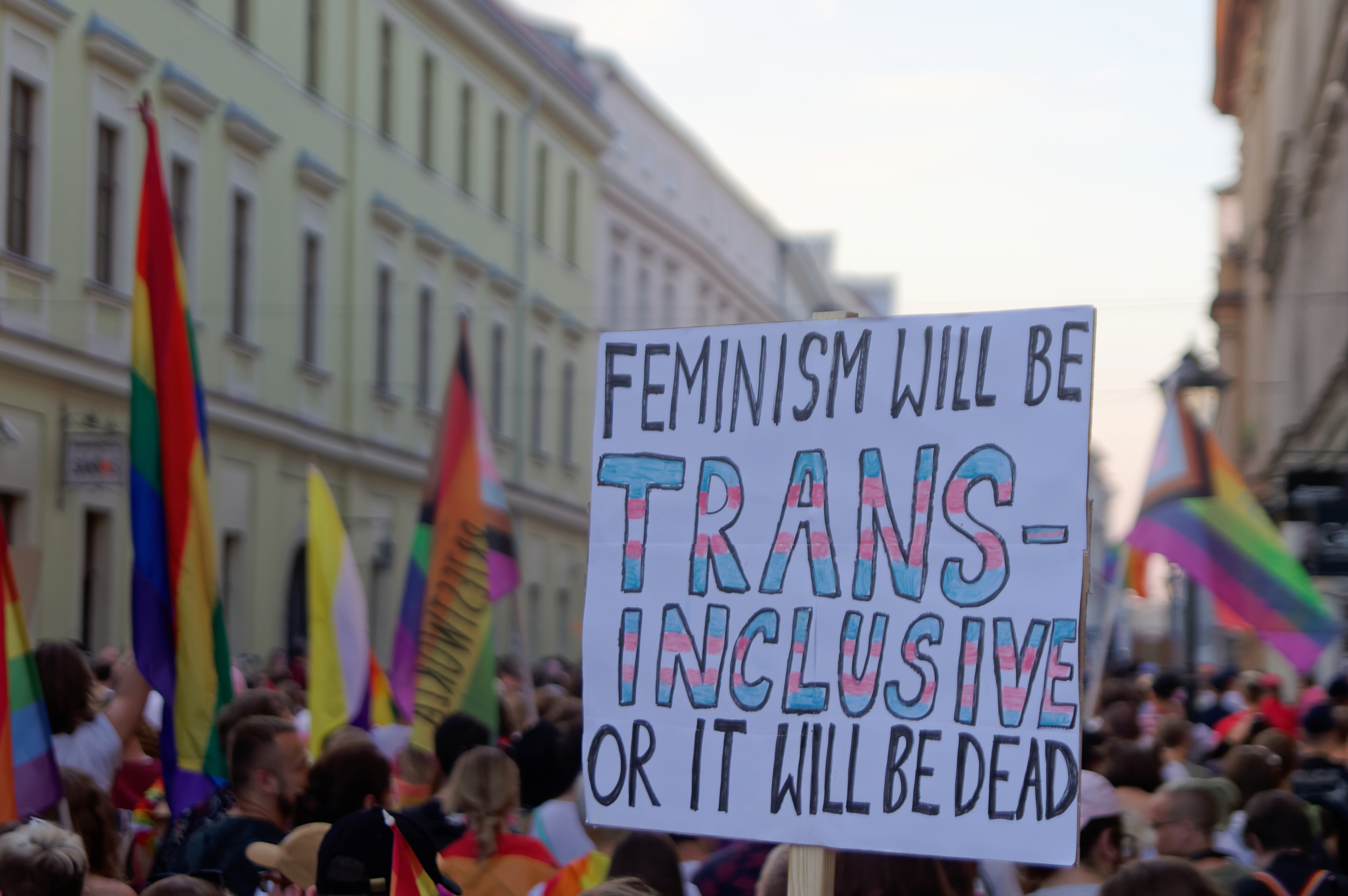
Equality March 2021 in Kraków, Poland

Transfeminism, or trans feminism, aims to synthesize feminist and transgender discourse. Transfeminists argue that there are multiple forms of oppression and sexism, and that trans and cisgender women have shared interests in combating sexism. Influential transfeminists include Julia Serano and Diana Courvant. According to Emi Koyama, the two primary principles of transfeminism are that all people should not only be allowed to live their own lives in whichever way they choose and define themselves however they feel is right, but should also be respected by society for their individuality and uniqueness, and that each individual has every right, and is the only one to have the right, to possess complete control over their own bodies. There shall be no form of authority—political, medical, religious, or otherwise—that can override a person's decisions regarding their bodies and their wellbeing, and their autonomy is fully in the hands of that sole individual. Transfeminist critics of mainstream feminism say that as an institutionalized movement, feminism has lost sight of the basic idea that biology is not destiny. In fact, they argue, many feminists seem perfectly comfortable equating sex and gender and insisting on a given destiny for trans persons based on nothing more than biology. Transfeminism aims to challenge the fixedness of gender that its supporters believe traditional approaches to women's studies depend upon.

=== Cyberfeminism and xenofeminism ===
Cyberfeminism is a branch of feminism that focuses on cyberspace, the Internet, and technology. The term was coined in the early late-1980s and early-1990s, particularly after the publication of "A Cyborg Manifesto" by feminist Donna Haraway, which argued for feminism to move beyond the limitations of traditional gender, feminism, and politics. Out of cyberfeminism grew xenofeminism, arguing for the use of technology as a means towards the abolition of gender. Feminist collective Laboria Cuboniks published a manifesto titled Xenofeminism: A Politics for Alienation that argued against the conception of nature as immutable and the conception that what is natural is good, declaring that "if nature is unjust, change nature!" Xenofeminism has positioned itself as explicitly trans-inclusive and as rejecting the gender binary. Feminist Helen Hester has linked DIY self-help movements by second wave feminists and biohacking performed by trans people as a continuing lineage of emancipation. In a 2019 article in Feminist Review, Emily Jones said the movement noted how "essentialism and identity politics haunt the contemporary feminist and queer movement" and that instead of "wishing to eradicate what are seen as gendered traits, xenofeminism wants gender to explode and diffract: 'let a hundred sexes bloom!'. Thus, for xenofeminism, gender-abolitionism is about disrupting asymmetric gender systems and dispersing them, unpicking 'culturally weaponized markers of identity that harbour injustices', including gender as well as race, ability, class and sexuality."

== Trans-exclusionary radical feminism or gender-critical feminism ==
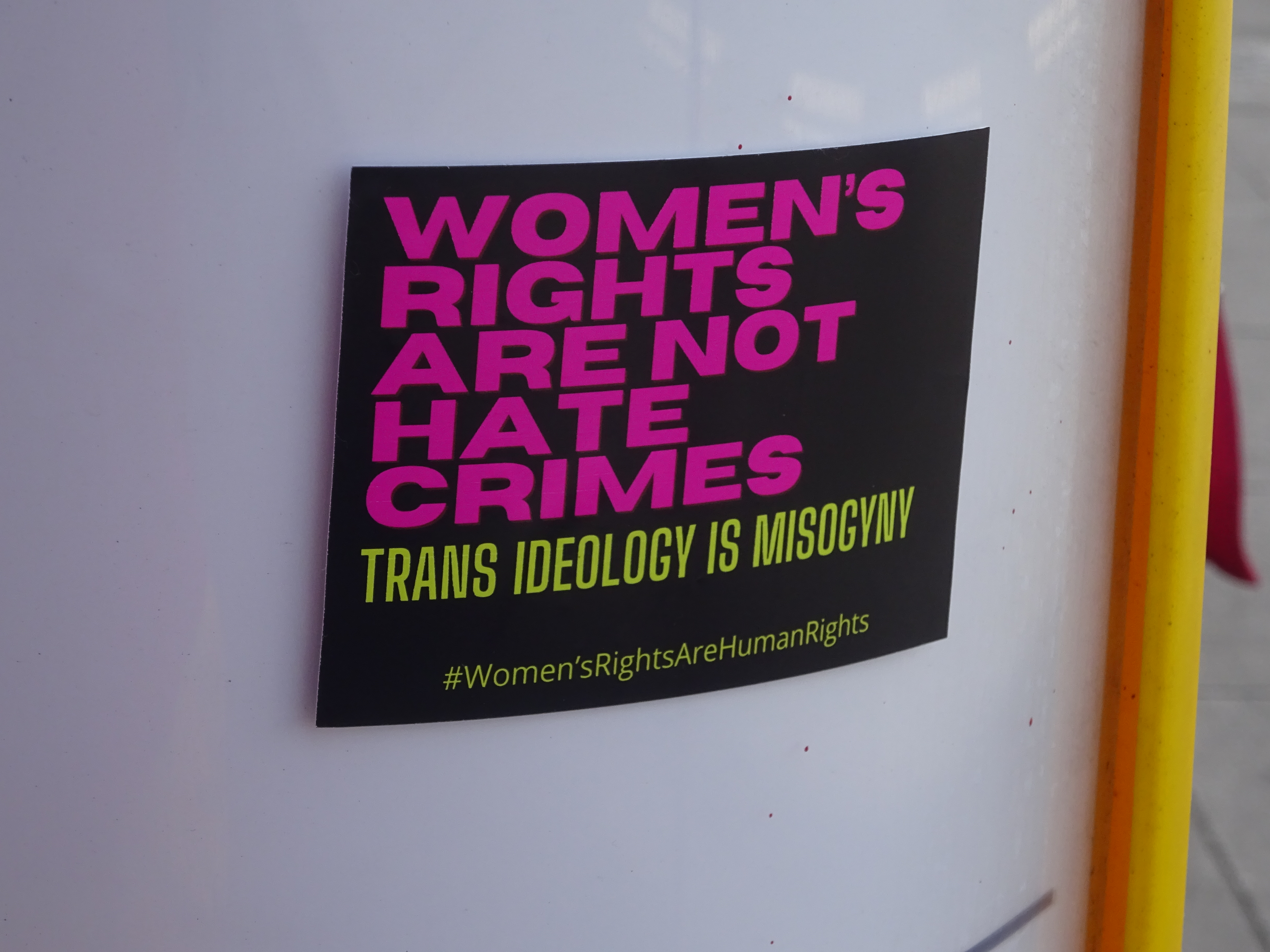
Sticker promoting gender-critical feminism

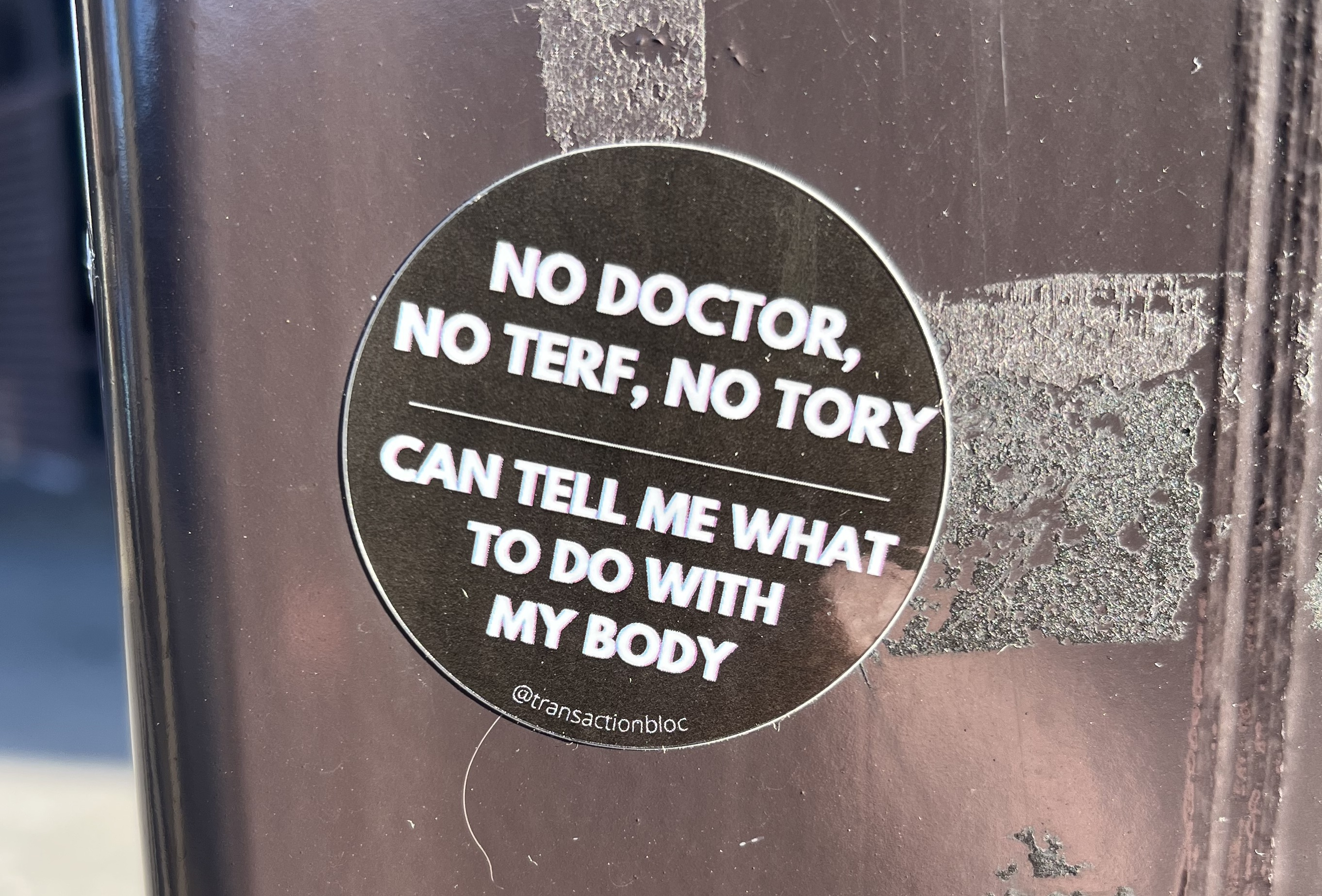
Sticker opposing gender-critical feminism

Feminists who describe themselves as "gender-critical" say that biological sex is "real, important, and immutable" and is "not to be conflated with gender identity", and that feminism should organize with emphasis on the basis of sex rather than gender. In her book Material Girls: Why Reality Matters for Feminism, Kathleen Stock described those whom she considered gender-critical feminists as being critics of gender in the sense of social stereotypes. Stock wrote: "Gender-critical feminists particularly rebel against the idea, implicit in gender identity theory, that what makes you a woman or a man is a feeling. As far as they are concerned, this feeling could only be, deep down, about the applicability of restrictive and damaging sex-associated stereotypes to yourself." Scholars have argued that these arguments, although presented as scientific truths, are ideological tools that "discredit critical scholarship" and enable "trans erasure and a denial of medical subtleties and embodied lived realities."

These feminists are also often referred to as transgender-exclusionary radical feminists or TERFs by their opponents. They hold beliefs considered transphobic by many other feminists, such as the belief that transgender identities are invalid, incoherent, or irrelevant, opposition to certain kinds of legal recognition and medical care for transgender people, and support for exclusion of trans women from women's spaces and organizations in favor of single-sex spaces.

Claire Thurlow states that "what was once termed TERF ... is now more often referred to as gender critical feminism/feminist ... despite efforts to obscure the point, gender critical feminism continues to rely on transphobic tropes, moral panics and essentialist understandings of men and women. These factors also continue to link trans-exclusionary feminism to anti-feminist reactionary politics and other 'anti-gender' movements." Feminist Viv Smythe, who is credited with coining the term "TERF", says it was intended to be a "technically neutral description ... to distinguish TERFs from other [radical feminists] ... who were trans*-positive/neutral."

These feminists generally prefer the term "gender-critical", and often consider TERF to be inaccurate, or a slur. Those described as TERFs or gender-critical are not necessarily associated with radical feminism. While these parties lack influence in academic feminist philosophy, they are relatively powerful in opposing transgender rights in the United Kingdom. Commenting on the bestselling books Material Girls: Why Reality Matters for Feminism by Kathleen Stock and Trans: When Ideology Meets Reality by Helen Joyce, New Statesman writer Louise Perry observed that gender-critical ideas that had been on the fringes in 2004, when Julie Bindel was accused of transphobia, had become mainstream in the United Kingdom by 2021.

In July 2018, Sally Hines, a University of Leeds professor of sociology and gender studies scholar, wrote in The Economist that feminism and trans rights have been falsely portrayed as being in conflict by a minority of anti-transgender feminists, who often "reinforce the extremely offensive trope of the trans woman as a man in drag who is a danger to women." Hines criticized these feminists for fueling "rhetoric of paranoia and hyperbole" against trans people, saying that they abandon or undermine feminist principles in their anti-trans narratives, such as bodily autonomy and self-determination of gender, and employ "reductive models of biology and restrictive understandings of the distinction between sex and gender" in defense of such narratives. She concluded with a call for explicit recognition of anti-transgender feminism as a violation of equality and dignity, and "a doctrine that runs counter to the ability to fulfill a liveable life or, often, a life at all."

In February 2019, feminist theorist, writer, and Yale professor Roxane Gay said issues that impact marginalized women, such as sexual harassment and misconduct, extend to trans women as well, and that trans-exclusionary feminists have "woefully failed" to consider trans women's experience. She points out that the intersection between trans women and race lead to high suicide and murder rates for Black trans women. Describing the effects of transphobia as "appalling" and as leading to trans people's maltreatment and suffering, Gay stated: "I think a lot of feminists are very comfortable being anti-trans. And that's painful to see because we should know better, having been marginalized as women throughout history and today. How dare we marginalize others now?" In September 2020, Judith Butler said that trans-exclusionary radical feminism is "a fringe movement that is seeking to speak in the name of the mainstream, and that our responsibility is to refuse to let that happen".

Hines states that trans-exclusionary radical feminists are a minority among feminists, and that they have published a declaration that advocates the concept of sex-based rights. In June 2021, the Association for Women's Rights in Development said that the sex-based rhetoric employed by trans-exclusionary radical feminists "misuses concepts of sex and gender to push a deeply discriminatory agenda." In October 2021, they described anti-gender movements as a fascist trend and cautioned self-declared feminists from allying with such movements in targeting trans, non-binary, and genderqueer people. Earlier, in May 2021, Nancy Kelley, the head of Stonewall, compared gender-critical feminism to antisemitism.

In January 2022, the Council of Europe approved a report, written by General Rapporteur on LGBT+ rights Fourat Ben Chikha, which condemned "extensive and virulent" attacks on LGBT+ rights. The report condemned "the highly prejudicial anti-gender, gender-critical and anti-trans narratives which reduce the fight for the equality of LGBTI people to what these movements deliberately mischaracterise as 'gender ideology' or 'LGBTI ideology'. Such narratives deny the very existence of LGBTI people, dehumanise them, and often falsely portray their rights as being in conflict with women's and children's rights, or societal and family values in general. All of these are deeply damaging to LGBTI people, while also harming women's and children's rights and social cohesion."

In April 2022, feminist author Jude Doyle also argued that the TERF movement became infiltrated by fascists from the mid-2010s and poses a global threat to feminism. Earlier in September 2020, Butler said that "it is painful to see that Trump's position that gender should be defined by biological sex, and that the evangelical and right-wing Catholic effort to purge 'gender' from education and public policy accords with the trans-exclusionary radical feminists' return to biological essentialism."

=== Relations with conservatives ===
Some gender-critical feminists have been linked to conservative groups and politicians who oppose legislation that would expand transgender rights in the United States, the United Kingdom, and Australia. The Southern Poverty Law Center, an American civil rights nonprofit, reported in 2017 that American Christian right groups were trying to "separate the T from LGB" by casting transgender rights as antagonistic to feminism and lesbian or gay people. The report said this trend was "part of a larger strategy, meant to weaken transgender rights advocates by attempting to separate them from their allies, feminists and LGBT rights advocates."

In January 2019, The Heritage Foundation, an American conservative think tank, hosted a panel with members of the self-described radical feminist organization Women's Liberation Front opposed to the US Equality Act, which would prohibit discrimination on the basis of gender identity. Heron Greenesmith of Political Research Associates, an American liberal think tank, said that this collaboration was in part a reaction to the trans community's "incredible gains" in civil rights and visibility, and that anti-trans feminists and conservatives capitalize on a "scarcity mindset rhetoric" whereby civil rights are portrayed as a limited commodity that must be prioritized to cisgender women over other groups. Greenesmith compared this rhetoric to the prioritization of the rights of citizens over non-citizens and white people over people of color. Bev Jackson, one of the founders of the LGB Alliance, once argued that "working with The Heritage Foundation is sometimes the only possible course of action" since "the leftwing silence on gender in the U.S. is even worse than in the UK." She later clarified these comments, saying she did find links to The Heritage Foundation "problematic" due to their support for "anti-women policies", "Yet it was their publicity that made it possible to launch a gender-critical movement in the U.S."

In a 2020 article in Lambda Nordica, Erika Alm of the University of Gothenburg and Elisabeth L. Engebretsen of the University of Stavanger, said that there was "growing convergence, and sometimes conscious alliances, between "gender-critical" feminists (sometimes known as TERFs - Trans-Exclusionary Radical Feminists), religious and social conservatives, as well as right-wing politics and even neo-Nazi and fascist movements" and that the convergence was linked to "their reliance on an essentialised and binary understanding of sex and/or gender, often termed 'bio-essentialism.'" Another 2020 article, published in The Sociological Review, said that "the language of 'gender ideology' originates in anti-feminist and anti-trans discourses among right-wing Christians, with the Catholic Church acting as a major nucleating agent", and that the term "saw increasing circulation in trans-exclusionary radical feminist discourse" from around 2016. It further stated that "a growing number of anti-trans campaigners associated with radical feminist movements have openly aligned themselves with anti-feminist organisations."

In a 2021 paper in Signs: Journal of Women in Culture and Society, Hil Malatino of Pennsylvania State University said that gender-critical feminism in the US has "begun to build coalition with the evangelical Right around the legal codification of sex as a biological binary" and that "popular news media frames transphobia as part of a rational, enlightened, pragmatic response to what is variously called the 'trans lobby' and the 'cult of trans.'" Another 2021 paper, published in Law and Social Inquiry, said that "a coalition of Christian conservative legal organizations, conservative foundations, Trump administration officials, Republican party lawmakers, and trans-exclusionary radical feminists has assembled to redefine the right to privacy in service of anti-transgender politics", and that "social conservatives have cast the issue as one of balancing two competing rights claims rather than one of outright animus against a gender minority population."

== By country or region ==
=== International organisations ===
UN Women works to protect the rights of transgender people, and "urgently calls on communities and governments around the world to stand up for LGBTIQ+ rights."

The Association for Women's Rights in Development (AWID) supports LGBTIQ rights and opposes the anti-gender movement, and has described trans-exclusionary feminists as "trojan horses in human rights spaces" that seek to undermine human rights; AWID said that anti-trans activity is "alarming", that "the 'sex-based' rhetoric misuses concepts of sex and gender to push a deeply discriminatory agenda" and that "trans-exclusionary feminists ... undermine progressions on gender and sexuality and protection of rights of marginalized groups."

The International Alliance of Women along with its over fifty affiliates worldwide support LGBT+ rights and have expressed concern over "anti-trans voices [that] are becoming ever louder and [that] are threatening feminist solidarity across borders."

=== Africa ===
In 2010, the Social, Health and Empowerment Feminist Collective of Transgender Women in Africa was formed.

=== South America ===
==== Argentina ====
During the 1990s, Argentine LGBT activism took off, and the end of the decade saw the entry of travestis (Note: "Travesti" (meaning transvestite) was historically a pejorative used to designate trans women and crossdressers in South America. The word has been reappropriated by activists and is now used as a non-binary label for people assigned male at birth that have a transfeminine gender identity, but choose not to identify themselves as trans women.) into spaces of feminist discussion, marking the beginning of transfeminism in Argentina. Lohana Berkins was a feminist and one of travesti activism's most prominent leaders. Berkins got into feminism in the 1990s through meetings with lesbian feminists such as Alejandra Sarda, Ilse Fuskova, Chela Nadio and Fabiana Tron.

The Argentine government's response to the COVID-19 pandemic in Argentina included trans-inclusive gender-based measures, with Minister of Women, Genders and Diversity Elizabeth Gómez Alcorta stating that "trans people are particularly vulnerable in our country."

The Argentine feminist movement, including the National Gathering of Women, has seen debates over reforming the Spanish language to be more gender neutral in recent years.

The campaign to legalise abortion in Argentina has included transgender people, and after the movement was successful, the bill legalising abortion explicitly included trans and non-binary people.

=== North America ===
==== Canada ====
The Canadian Anti-Hate Network said that despite labelling themselves as feminists, TERF groups often collaborate with conservative and far-right groups. According to journalist Neil Macdonald, Canada saw an increase in debates about transgender issues in feminism especially after the introduction of Bill C-16 in 2016, which added gender expression and gender identity as protected characteristics to the Canadian Human Rights Act and was opposed by a range of conservatives and some feminists, such as Meghan Murphy.

Feminist writer Margaret Atwood has said she disagrees with the views that trans women are not women or should not use women's washrooms. In May 2021, over 110 women's and human rights organisations in Canada signed a statement supporting trans-inclusionary feminism, stating that "trans people are a driving force in our feminist movements and make incredible contributions across all facets of our society." Canadian women's sporting organisations have also supported trans-inclusion, with the Canadian Women's Hockey League having an openly trans woman play, the Canada women's national soccer team having an openly non-binary player play, and Rugby Canada rejecting proposals to ban trans women from the sport.

In 1995, Kimberly Nixon, a trans woman, volunteered for training as a rape crisis counselor at Vancouver Rape Relief & Women's Shelter. When the shelter determined Nixon was trans, it expelled her, with staff saying it made it impossible for her to understand the experiences of their clients. Nixon disagreed, disclosing her own history of partner abuse, and sued on the grounds of discrimination. Nixon's attorneys argued there was no basis for the dismissal, citing Diana Courvant's experiences as the first publicly trans woman to work in a women-only domestic violence shelter. In 2007 the Canadian Supreme Court refused to hear Nixon's appeal, ending the case. The Vancouver Rape Relief & Women's Shelter was the centre of a further controversy regarding exclusion of transgender women when the City of Vancouver Council stopped awarding the shelter an annual $34,000 grant in 2019 over its exclusion of trans women.

In January 2018, the Halifax Women's March came under criticism for a lack of intersectionality, with a number of Indigenous, Muslim, and trans feminist activists breaking away from the march to form a rally of their own, titled Walking the Talk. In March of that year, Gabrielle Bouchard was elected leader of the Fédération des femmes du Québec, the first transgender woman to hold the position.

==== United States ====
Mainstream feminist organizations in the United States such as the National Organization for Women (NOW), the League of Women Voters, the National Women's Law Center and the Feminist Majority Foundation all support trans rights. In 1997, NOW passed a resolution that affirmed trans inclusion within the organization; they also supported "recognition of transgender oppression" and issued a call "for education on the rights of transgender people." NOW president Terry O'Neill said the struggle against transphobia is a feminist issue. NOW has affirmed that "trans women are women, trans girls are girls." In a further statement NOW said that "trans women are women. They deserve equal opportunity, health care, a safe community & workplace, and they deserve to play sports. They have a right to have their identity respected without conforming to perceived sex and gender identity standards. We stand with you." NOW has said that "'debate' about trans girls and women in school sports spreads transphobia and bigotry through the false lens of 'fairness'" that amounts to a hate campaign.

Women's March, an organization launched in 2017 to protest the policies of the Trump administration, is also trans-inclusive, has stated that "trans women are women" and condemned TERFs. Women's March doesn't allow transphobia in its events. The National Women's Law Center "unequivocally supports the inclusion of trans women in women's sports" and has said that "in recent years, the far right has been attempting to divide, and thereby weaken, our feminist movement with fearmongering around transgender women athletes in women's sports." In 2020 the League of Women Voters joined a lawsuit to protect transgender women and girls in sports.

A statement by 16 women's rights organizations including the National Women's Law Center, the National Women's Political Caucus, Girls, Inc., Legal Momentum, End Rape on Campus, the American Association of University Women, Equal Rights Advocates and the Women's Sports Foundation said that, "as organizations that fight every day for equal opportunities for all women and girls, we speak from experience and expertise when we say that nondiscrimination protections for transgender people—including women and girls who are transgender—are not at odds with women's equality or well-being, but advance them" and that "we support laws and policies that protect transgender people from discrimination, including in participation in sports, and reject the suggestion that cisgender women and girls benefit from the exclusion of women and girls who happen to be transgender."

==== Mexico ====
Contemporary feminist organizations active in Mexico like Grupo de Información en Reproducción Elegida (GIRE), Equis - Justicia para las Mujeres, the Luchadoras collective, and Fondo Semillas are supportive of transgender people and consider transgender rights a part of their stated goals. Conversely some feminist groups with ties to anti-trans politics have gained popularity in recent years. Las Brujas del Mar and one of their spokespersons, Arussi Unda— cited as an organizer of the 2020 National Women's Strike— have been accused of aligning themselves with anti-trans politics.

Trans exclusive sentiments have had a marginal influence on Mexico’s feminist movements since the 1970s, but Laura Lecuona’s 2017 book “Cuando lo trans no es transgresor” ("When Trans Is Not Transgressive") is credited with sparking the emergence of a broader, contemporary gender-critical feminist movement. A year earlier, in 2016, a large anti-gender, anti-LGBT protest organized by the Frente Nacional por la Familia (National Front for the Family) also led to an increased presence of anti-trans rhetoric within the conservative Mexican politics. Authors Siobhan McManus and Julianna Neuhouser argue that, since 2017, gender-critical feminism has increasingly converged with Mexico's conservative political wing.

Since the implementation of femicide laws in Mexico, trans feminist and feminist groups broadly have criticized its exclusion of crimes committed against trans women. After the murder of Paola Buenrostro, a trans sex worker, in 2016, activists in Mexico City lobbied against what they saw as the police’s negligence in investigating her murder. These efforts culminated in Mexico City passing the nation’s second transfemicide law in 2024, naming it after Buenrostro.

=== Asia ===
==== South Korea ====
According to Hyun-Jae Lee of the University of Seoul, although "until the eighties modern Korean feminism had been fairly cis-woman-centric and based on female identity, they did not officially exclude "biological men", refugees, or transgender people because of their biological sex" and that the "[trans-]exclusive stance of radical feminism never existed in Korean society before the 2000s."

In 2016, the Korean-based online radical feminist community WOMAD split from the larger community Megalia after Megalia issued a ban on the use of certain explicit slurs against gay men and transgender people. This change in policy led to the migration of anti-LGBT members. WOMAD has caused controversy due to extreme online trolling and show extreme hatred towards transgender people; for this reason, WOMAD have been called "Korean-style TERFs". The organisers of the 2018 Hyehwa Station Protest barred trans women and non-binary people from attending the protest. In 2020, Sookmyung Women's University became the first Korean women's university to admit a trans student; however, the student later withdrew her acceptance after news of her acceptance sparked controversy.

=== Europe ===
The European Women's Lobby (EWL) is trans-inclusive. EWL called for more attention and research into discrimination against trans women and lesbians and their specific health needs. EWL has said that "women with multiple identities are rendered more vulnerable to discrimination, violence and violation of their rights. The situation of (...) transgender women has long been made invisible. It is urgent to make sure that all policies are designed to not leave a single girl or woman behind."

==== Denmark ====
The Danish Women's Society supports LGBTQA rights, and has stated that it takes homophobia and transphobia very seriously, that "we support all initiatives that promote the rights of gay and transgender people" and that "we see the LGBTQA movement as close allies in the struggle against inequality and we fight together for a society where gender and sexuality do not limit an individual."

==== France ====
In February 2020, an open letter was published in The Huffington Post signed by around 50 French feminists, including sociologist Christine Delphy and ex-Femen activist Marguerite Stern, questioning the presence of trans women in feminist movements. The Huffington Post later removed the letter from their website. In response to the letter, several different feminist organisations, such as the Syndicat du travail sexuel, the Collectif NousToutes, and the Collages féminicides Paris, who Stern had previously been involved with, issued statements condemning transphobia.

In late-February 2020, a further group of feminists and feminist organisations released an open letter stating that they opposed the importing of "transphobic debates" into France and that creating divisions between cis and trans women "only serve the patriarchy."

==== Germany ====
Leading German women's organization Deutscher Frauenring is intersectional and opposes transphobia. The umbrella organization for the German women's movement, the German Women's Council, has stated that "trans women are women and we need to represent them and defend their rights."

==== Iceland ====
In 2012, Jyl Josephson, professor of Political Science and Women's and Gender Studies at Rutgers University–Newark, stated that in Iceland "transgender and gender scholars seem to have a more congenial and more recent relationship." Non-binary Icelandic journalist Owl Fisher has stated that "in Iceland the women's rights movement as a whole has been wholly supportive of trans rights for decades."

In 2019, Icelandic Prime Minister Katrín Jakobsdóttir proposed a bill to introduce gender recognition via statutory declaration in the country. The bill was passed by the Althing by a vote of 45–0, with three abstentions.

On Women's Rights Day in Iceland in 2020, the Icelandic Women's Rights Association organised an event together with Trans Ísland that saw several different feminist organisations in the country discuss strategies to stop anti-trans sentiment from increasing its influence within Icelandic feminism. Later that year, Trans Ísland was unanimously granted status as a member association of the Icelandic Women's Rights Association. In 2021 the Icelandic Women's Rights Association, noting the traditional sense of solidarity between the women's movement and LGBTQ+ movement, organized an event on how the women's movement could counter "anti-trans voices [that] are becoming ever louder and [that] are threatening feminist solidarity across borders."

==== Ireland ====
In January 2018, roughly 1,000 feminists in Ireland, including members of several feminist groups such as the Irish Network Against Racism (INAR), signed an open letter condemning an event held in Dublin by a group of UK-based trans-exclusionary radical feminists which opposed proposed reforms to the British Gender Recognition Act. The open letter stated that "the signatories of this letter, organise hand in hand with our trans sisters. Together, cis and trans, we are Irish feminism. Trans women are our sisters; their struggles are ours, our struggles theirs."

During the referendum on the Thirty-sixth Amendment of the Constitution of Ireland that successfully saw the legalisation for abortion, the Together for Yes campaign group was explicitly trans-inclusive.

In November 2020, on Trans Day of Remembrance, the National Women's Council of Ireland and Amnesty International Ireland co-signed a statement along with a number of LGBT+ and human rights groups condemning trans-exclusionary feminism. The letter called upon the media and politicians "to no longer provide legitimate representation for those that share bigoted beliefs, that are aligned with far right ideologies and seek nothing but harm and division" and stated that "these fringe internet accounts stand against affirmative medical care of transgender people, and they stand against the right to self-identification of transgender people in this country. In summation they stand against trans, women's and gay rights by aligning themselves with far right tropes and stances."

In March 2021, the Abortion Rights Campaign issued a statement condemning the Bell v Tavistock ruling the UK, stating that trans people had played a role in the Yes vote of the Thirty-sixth Amendment of the Constitution of Ireland referendum and that the ruling was "ultimately an attack on our collective right to bodily integrity."

==== Italy ====
A 2019 study from the European University Institute that examined the feminist Non Una Di Meno (Italian chapter of Ni una menos association) in Italy argued that difference feminism had traditionally been prevalent in the country, but was being supplanted by intersectional feminism. The shift was driven especially by younger feminist activists, often accompanied with rejections of binary gender as well as increased prominence of anti-racist and anti-capitalist organising, who considered that "intersectional feminism grasps the core of the feminist and LGBT struggles, which is the "union of all the oppressed against the oppressors."

==== Norway ====
In Norway, the Norwegian Association for Women's Rights (NKF) is trans-inclusive and supports legal protections against discrimination on the basis of sexual orientation, gender identity and gender expression. In 2015/2016 NKF supported the Gender Recognition Act, which the NKF President described as a milestone for LGBT+ rights that the women's rights movement welcomes. In 2018 NKF also supported legal protections against discrimination and hate speech on the basis of sexual orientation, gender identity and gender expression in the Penal Code. The Norwegian Women's Lobby, an umbrella organization of ten member organizations, describes itself as inclusive and working "to represent the interests of all those who identify as girls and women", and states that it understands discrimination against girls and women in an intersectional perspective and opposes transphobia.

==== Spain ====
During the Spanish transition to democracy in the late-1970s, trans people in Spain organised under the gay liberation movement seeking to repeal the Francoist regime's ban on homosexuality, as the Francoist regime would arrest trans people using those same laws. In 1978, the Colectivo de Travestis y Transexuales was founded as part of the Catalan gay liberation movement, the first trans-specific organisation in Spain. In 1987, the first national transgender association was formed, Transexualia, to fight against police violence. As several of the Transexualia founders were sex workers, they soon began working with feminist groups fighting against gendered violence, such as the Colectivo de Feministas Lesbianas de Madrid and the Comisión Antiagresiones. Part of the 1993 National Feminist Conference was dedicated to discussing trans issues in Spain. Through the 1990s, the scope of co-operation between the trans liberation movement and the feminist movement grew, and at the 2000 National Feminist Conference featured several talks by trans people, including Kim Pérez and Laura Bugalho. The 2009 Granada Feminist Conference then saw an influx of younger feminists, and a dedication to formulating a distinct Spanish transfeminism. According to Lucas Platero of King Juan Carlos University, the 2009 conference resulted in a shift towards a feminism that placed greater emphasis on criticising the gender binary and that was "more queer, more decolonial, and intersectional."

In 2021, a split in the Spanish left-wing coalition government occurred over the Legislative Proposal for the Real and Effective Equality of Trans People, with United Podemos Minister for Equality Irene Montero advancing the bill that would have included the introduction of legal gender recognition via statutory declaration (therefore responding to long-lasting demands for full depathologization) as well as legal recognition of non-binary identities. However, Spanish Socialist Workers' Party (PSOE) Deputy Prime Minister Carmen Calvo argued that the bill "could put at risk the identity criteria for 47 million Spaniards." The bill ultimately failed to pass after the Socialist Workers' Party abstained on the vote. In parallel to this, some feminist intellectuals with different degrees of affinity to the PSOE, most notably authors Amelia Valcárcel, Alicia Miyares and Lidia Falcón, had been making public remarks opposing the legislative proposal, as well as comments that other feminist figures reported as transphobic. Ultimately, a new, similar legislative proposal was passed, recognizing the right of trans people to self-determine without the need of any medical process, although demands concerning non-binary people eventually fell off.

==== United Kingdom ====
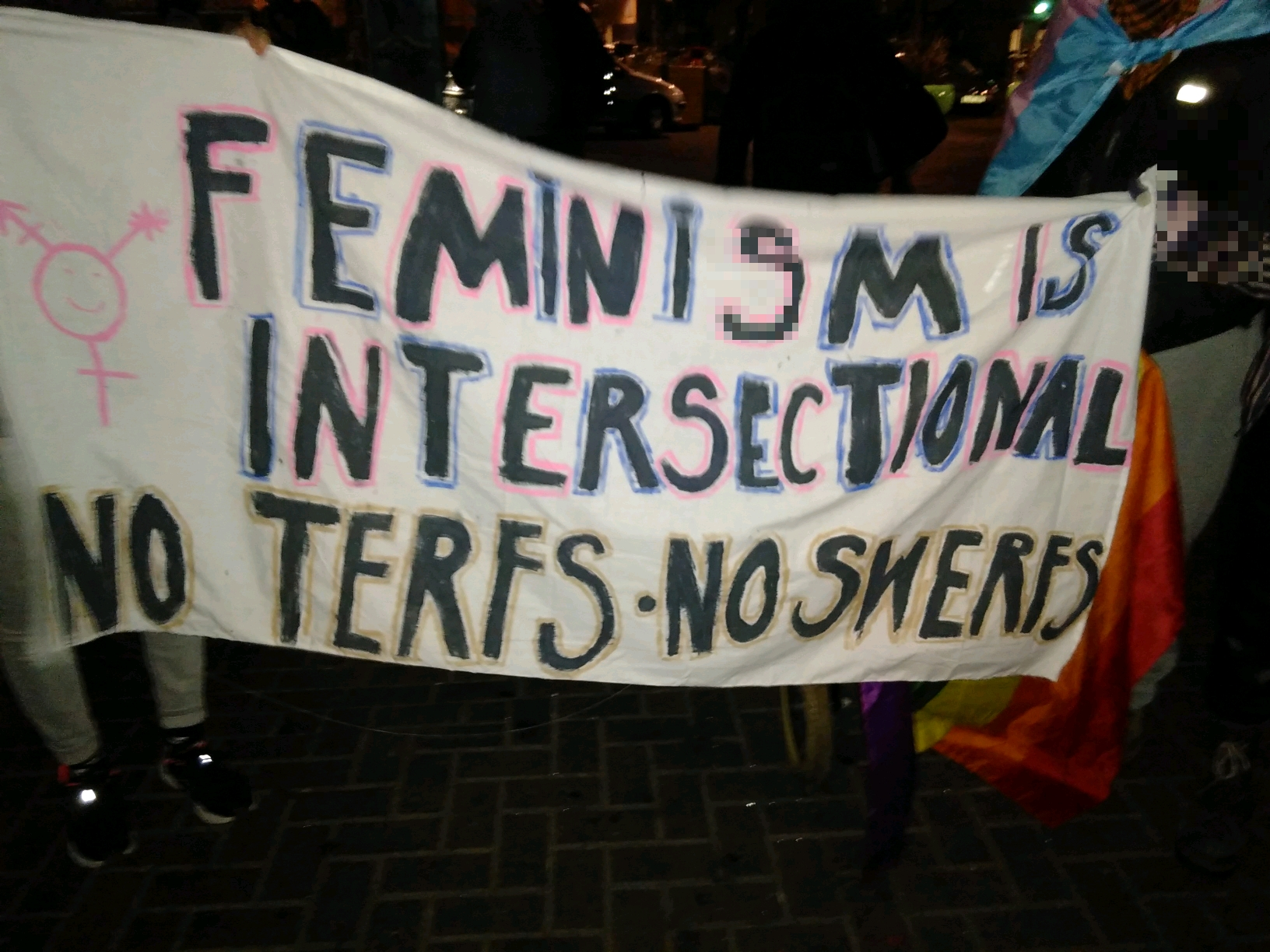
A banner at a protest in the United Kingdom in 2020

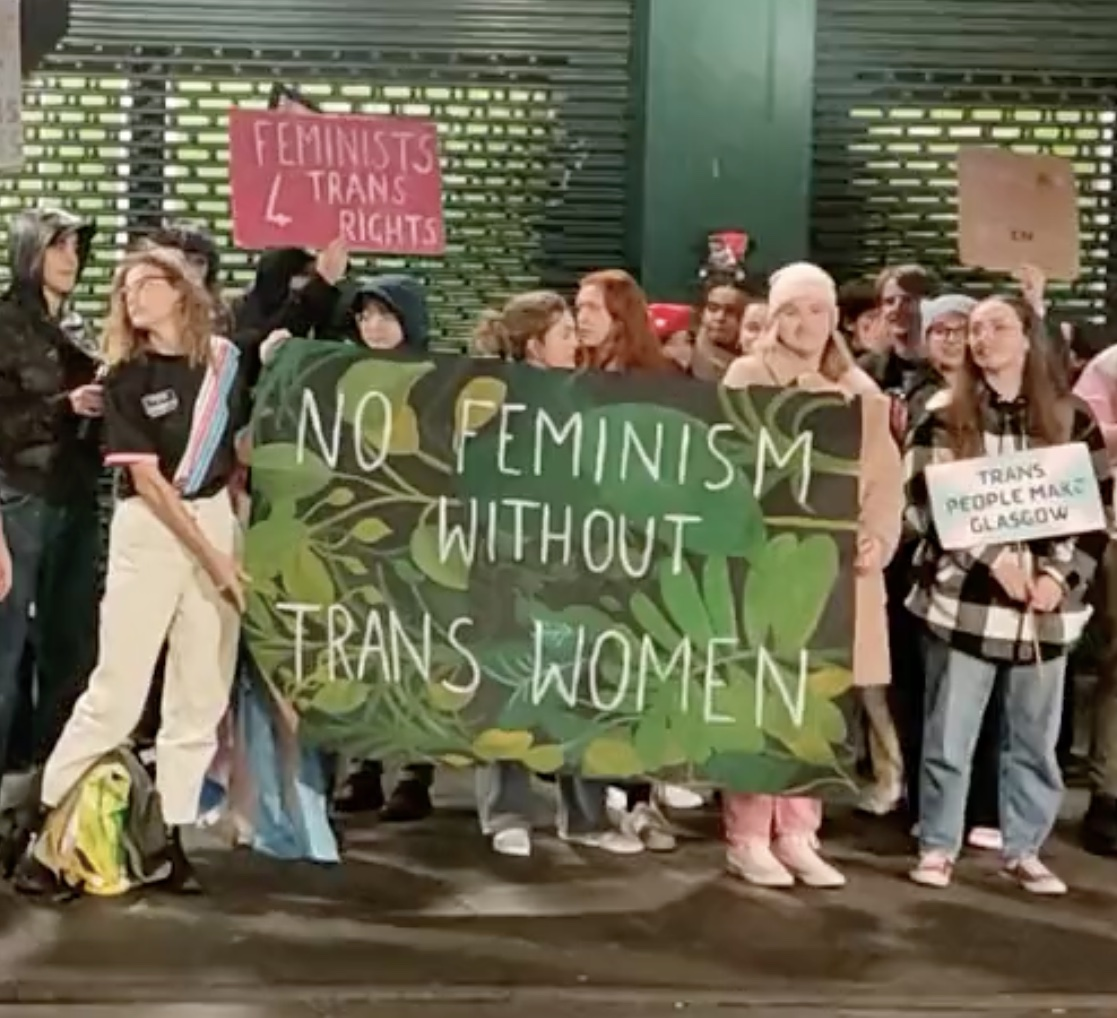
Glasgow Trans Rally, October 2023

The UK government's 2018 consultation on reforming the Gender Recognition Act 2004 became a locus of conflict between trans-exclusionary radical feminists and advocates for trans acceptance. The GRA requires that one be medically diagnosed with gender dysphoria and live for two years in one's felt identity before legally changing gender. Proposed reforms would allow one to self-declare one's legal gender without a diagnosis or waiting period. While the UK's Equality Act 2010 permitted providers of single-sex or sex-segregated services such as women's shelters to deny access to transgender people on a case-by-case basis, a 2016 report of the House of Commons's Women and Equalities Committee recommended that providers no longer be permitted to exclude persons who had obtained legal recognition of their "acquired gender" under the GRA.

Groups including Fair Play For Women and Woman's Place UK were founded in opposition to the proposed reforms. The groups have been condemned by feminists who support the reforms. London Feminist Library organiser Lola Olufemi described Woman's Place UK as "a clearly transphobic organisation" after withdrawing from an event at the University of Oxford that featured WPUK supporter and Oxford professor Selina Todd.

British trans-exclusive feminist groups objected to the proposed GRA self-ID reform as eroding protections for women-only safe spaces and liable to abuse by cisgender men—issues disputed by advocates of reform and unsupported by current evidence. A 2020 paper in SAGE Open said that "the case against trans inclusion in the United Kingdom has been presented primarily through social media and blog-type or journalistic online platforms lacking the traditional prepublication checks of academic peer review". Pro-trans feminist academics such as Akwugo Emejulu and Alison Phipps view self-declaration as a right for transgender people.

In October 2018 the UK edition of The Guardian published an editorial on GRA reform supporting a lessening of the barriers to legal gender change but also stating that "Women's oppression by men has a physical basis, and to deny the relevance of biology when considering sexual inequality is a mistake", and that, "Women's concerns about sharing dormitories or changing rooms with 'male-bodied' people must be taken seriously." Journalists from The Guardian's US edition wrote an editorial repudiating their UK counterpart's stance, stating that it "promoted transphobic viewpoints" and that its "unsubstantiated argument only serves to dehumanize and stigmatize trans people". In March 2019 more than 160 women, including Emma Thompson and members of the UK parliament, cosigned an open letter expressing solidarity with trans women and support for GRA reform, organised by LGBT charity Time for Inclusive Education.

Seven Scottish women's groups – Close the Gap, Engender, Equate Scotland, Rape Crisis Scotland, Scottish Women's Aid, Women 50:50, and Zero Tolerance – released a joint statement during the GRA consultations endorsing the proposed reforms and stating that "we do not regard trans equality and women's equality to be in competition or contradiction with each other." The Cambridge Rape Crisis Centre has indicated that it accepts trans people as volunteers and the Edinburgh Rape Crisis Centre has maintained individual gender-neutral bathrooms. Feminist direct action group Sisters Uncut has stated that "trans people and gender-nonconforming people experience disproportionate levels of violence ... if we don't centre those who exist on the margins, what kind of movement is that?"

In 2021, an Employment Appeal Tribunal in the case of Maya Forstater v Centre for Global Development (CGD) found that gender-critical beliefs pass the legal test of a protected belief under the Equality Act 2010 because they "did not seek to destroy the rights of trans persons". While Forstater was "delighted to have been vindicated", the CGD described the decision as a "step backwards for inclusivity and equality for all".

In November 2021, the Middle Temple LGBTQ+ Forum hosted a debate on the topic of conversion therapy, following the launch of a public consultation on how to ban the practice. The panel consisted of Stonewall CEO Nancy Kelley, campaigner Jayne Ozanne, and gender-critical feminist and barrister Naomi Cunningham. A letter said to be signed by more than a hundred legal professionals objected to Cunningham's inclusion on the panel, describing her as "anti-trans". Kelley called for a complete ban on conversion therapy. Cunningham presented a "gender-critical" view that there are multiple explanations for why a young person may call themselves transgender, such as unease at being gay, so a ban on therapists exploring these alternative explanations amounts to "the most savage conversion therapy ever invented". Ozanne spoke about her personal experience of conversion therapy, but also described Cunningham's speech as "very insensitive" and "transphobic", which Cunningham denied.

Drawing on theory of radicalization, the sociologist Craig McLean argues that discourse on transgender-related issues in the UK has been radicalized in response to the activities of new lobby groups that push "a radical agenda to deny the basic rights of trans people ... under the cover of "free speech'". Finn Mackay argued that "during the pandemic, the ceaseless attacks on and lies told about trans people in our media have only increased ... the fact that our media is awash with conspiracy theories about trans lives ... should be a national shame."

=== Oceania ===
The Māori Women's Welfare League and the National Council of Women of New Zealand are trans-inclusive and have supported a shift to legal gender self-determination.

== See also ==
- Feminist movements and ideologies
- Feminist sex wars
- Feminist views on BDSM
- Feminist views on pornography
- Feminist views on prostitution
- Feminist views on sexuality
- Radical feminism#Views on transgender topics
- Gender essentialism
- Lesbian erasure
- Misogyny
- Social construction of gender
- Transmisogyny
