= Gender self-identification =

Social and legal concept regarding transgender rights

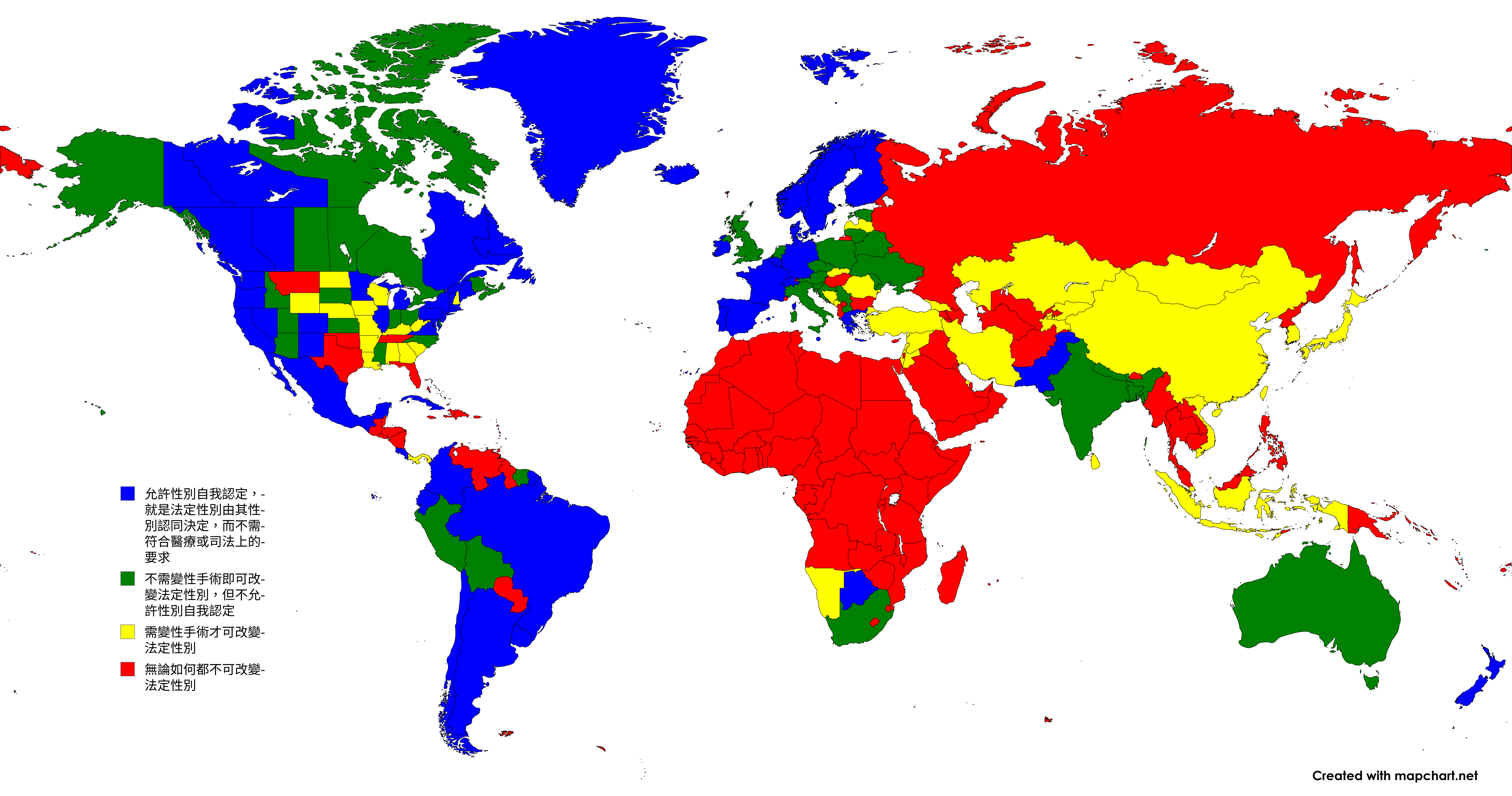
Laws concerning gender identity-expression by country or territory in 2025: Gender self-identification Legal identity change, surgery not required, but not gender self-identification Legal identity change, surgery required No legal identity change

Gender self-identification or gender self-determination is the principle that a person's legal sex or gender is determined by their gender identity, without medical or judicial requirements.

It is a major goal of the transgender rights movement. Advocates argue that medical requirements for gender recognition are intrusive and humiliating forms of gatekeeping that can pressure transgender individuals into undergoing unwanted medical procedures. They also claim that self-identification simplifies the process of transgender people living without prejudice and discrimination.

Proponents claim a lack of evidence suggesting adverse outcomes in countries where self-identification laws have been implemented, such as Ireland, which adopted self-identification policies in 2015. Opponents of the concept believe that safety in spaces like women's shelters and prisons and fairness in competitive sports is compromised by self-identification.

As of January 2026, 24 countries have enacted laws allowing gender self-identification without requiring judicial or medical approval: Argentina, Belgium, Botswana, Brazil, Chile, Colombia, Costa Rica, Cuba, Denmark, Ecuador, Finland, Germany, Iceland, Ireland, Luxembourg, Malta, New Zealand, Norway, Pakistan, Portugal, Spain, Sweden, Switzerland and Uruguay. Proposals for similar laws have sparked controversy in some nations, especially in the United Kingdom.

In federated countries like Australia, Canada and Mexico, gender recognition laws often vary by province or state. Within a single jurisdiction, procedures may also differ across official documents, such as birth certificates and passports. These laws do not necessarily encompass all aspects of gender recognition in areas such as healthcare or access to facilities.

Third gender self-determination is available in India, Nepal, Bangladesh, Colombia, Argentina, Australia, New Zealand and some American states.

== Positions of international bodies ==
In April 2015, the Parliamentary Assembly of the Council of Europe adopted Resolution 2048 (2015), within which "the Assembly calls on Member States to ... develop quick, transparent and accessible procedures, based on self-determination ... available for all people who seek to use them, irrespective of age, medical status, financial situation or police record".

Also in 2015, the Office of the United Nations High Commissioner for Human Rights stated that "abusive requirements as a precondition of recognition — for example, by requiring ... forced gender reassignment and other medical procedures" are "in violation of international human rights standards".

In 2018, Victor Madrigal-Borloz, the United Nations Independent Expert on Protection against violence and discrimination based on sexual orientation and gender identity, stated that "the right to self-determine one's gender was a fundamental part of a person's freedom and a cornerstone of the person's identity" and that states' obligations included "adopting legal measures such as being based on self-determination [and] ensuring that minors have access to recognition of their gender identity".

=== Positions of international charities ===
In 2014, Amnesty International released a report titled The state decides who I am: Lack of Legal Gender Recognition For Transgender People in Europe. The report criticized European countries for legal gender recognition laws that were based on stereotypical gender norms and violated rights such as the right to private and family life, recognition before the law, the highest attainable standard of health, and freedom from cruel, inhuman, and degrading treatment. Amnesty argued that transgender individuals should have access to legal gender recognition through quick, accessible, and transparent procedures that align with their own perceptions of gender identity.

To mark Transgender Awareness Week in November 2019, Dentons produced a report titled Only adults? Good practices in legal gender recognition for youth, written along with IGLYO and the Thomson Reuters Foundation. The report examined the status of legal gender recognition for minors in several European countries and positioned itself as a "powerful tool for activists".

Based on international children's rights standards, the report advocated for the right of individuals under 18 to obtain legal gender recognition based on self-declaration, the recognition of a third gender marker, publicly accessible transgender healthcare, and legal protections against discrimination based on gender identity. It also examined successful strategies for reform campaigns, emphasizing the importance of targeting younger politicians and youth wings of political parties, highlighting depathologization and human rights aspects, using personal stories to humanize the issue, intervening early in the legislative process, fostering strong collaboration among advocacy groups, minimizing the risk of public scrutiny of advocacy and legislative efforts, "tying your campaign to more popular reform" in what they termed a "veil of protection", and undermining parental involvement, calling the need for parental consent "restrictive and problematic for minors".

=== Positions of non-governmental organizations ===
The Sylvia Rivera Law Project (SRLP) in the United States is a legal advocacy organization which provides legal services and does policy work advocating for transgender peoples' access to identity documents. The SRLP advocates for the right of gender self-determination regarding the identity documents. They find that in practice, access to gender self-identification can be significantly restrained by socioeconomic status, immigration status, and documentation requirements. Transgender people, particularly those who are low-income, face greater difficulties in obtaining accurately gendered identification documents. This is a large systemic barrier since these are necessary for accessing public benefits, employment, housing, foster care systems and other essential services. For transgender immigrants these challenges are compounded as they face higher scrutiny and surveillance, made worse by other access barriers. The expansion of identification controls and counter-terrorism policies has contributed to increased criminalization and xenophobic enforcement practices. This limits many transgender immigrants' ability to obtain safe and accurate identification documents. This calls into question the practical implementation of gender self-determination policies in areas of immigration and identification documentation.

== Around the world ==
=== Africa ===
==== Botswana ====
In the 2017 case ND v. Attorney General of Botswana and Another, the High Court of Botswana ruled that the government must "ensure that procedures exist whereby all State-issued identity documents which indicate a person's gender/sex reflect the person's self-identified gender identity." Although there is no current legislation on legal gender recognition in Botswana, this ruling established a precedent for recognizing gender identity based on self-identification.

=== The Americas ===
Countries in the Americas recognising gender self-identification by 2021; sub-national entities are not marked

A 2018 study published in BMC International Health and Human Rights found that "the majority of countries from South America allow their transgender citizens to change name and gender in legal documents in a fast, easy, and inexpensive manner" and noted that "legislation to protect [sexual and gender minority] rights in South America underwent fundamental and positive transformations" during the 2010s. However, the study also highlighted that "transgender people are unable to change their gender in public records and legal documents in several Latin American and Caribbean countries—mostly in the Caribbean and Mesoamerica."

Argentina, Brazil, Chile, Colombia, Costa Rica, Cuba, Ecuador, and Uruguay have self-identification laws. Similar laws also exist in several Canadian provinces, as well as in some Mexican and U.S. states.

==== Argentina ====
In 2012, Argentina enacted the Ley de Género, becoming the first country to allow individuals to change their gender identity without medical requirements. In 2015, the World Health Organization cited Argentina as an exemplary country for providing transgender rights.

A 2018 study published in the Journal of Human Rights analyzed the factors leading to the creation of the law. It concluded that "a more institutionalized group played a major role in getting the issue on the agenda, while a more radical challenger coalition was crucial in developing and advancing the ground-breaking content."

==== Bolivia ====
The Gender Identity Law allows individuals over the age of 18 to legally change their name, gender, and photograph on official documents. While surgeries, hormone therapy, or a judicial order are not required, a psychological examination confirming the individual's informed consent is necessary. The law came into effect on 1 August 2016.

==== Brazil ====
On March 1, 2018, the Supreme Federal Court ruled that transgender individuals have the right to change their official name and sex based solely on self-declaration of their psychosocial identity. On June 29, 2018, the Corregedoria Nacional de Justiça, a body of the National Council of Justice, published regulations for registry offices to follow regarding this process.

==== Canada ====
As a federation, Canada's legal gender recognition procedures vary by province and territory. At the federal level, Canadians can change the gender marker on their passports through self-identification.

In Québec, legal gender recognition has operated on an affidavit basis since 2015. In 2021, the Coalition Avenir Québec government introduced Bill 2, proposing to reinstate a surgical requirement. Following significant controversy, Québec Minister of Justice Simon Jolin-Barrette announced the removal of this provision from the bill.

In 2017, Newfoundland and Labrador abolished the requirement for a medical letter, transitioning to a self-declaration process. Alberta followed in 2018, allowing legal gender changes through an affidavit and eliminating the need for a psychiatrist's letter. Nova Scotia adopted an affidavit process in 2019, and in 2022, British Columbia removed the medical letter requirement for adults seeking legal gender changes.

As of October 2021, Alberta, British Columbia, Prince Edward Island, Ontario, Saskatchewan, and all territories do not permit legal gender changes for those born outside of their jurisdictions. Federally, refugee claimants gained the right to change their legal gender in November 2020, and in March 2021, temporary residents were granted the same right without needing a passport change.

==== Chile ====
Since 2019, Chile's Gender Identity Law (Law 21,120) recognizes the right to self-perceived gender identity, allowing transgender individuals aged 14 and older to change their name and gender on official documents without prohibitive requirements. For individuals over the age of 18, the change is made by submitting a request to the Civil Registry and Identification Service without needing to provide evidence of medical interventions.

For minors aged 14 to 18, the process must be carried out in family courts and requires the permission and support of their legal representatives. While the process for minors does not mandate medical reports, it does require documentation on their psychosocial and family context.

The law enshrines key principles, including non-pathologization, protection from arbitrary discrimination, confidentiality, dignity in treatment, the best interests of the child, and recognition of progressive autonomy.

==== Colombia ====
Since 2015, Colombians have been able to change their legal gender and name by expressing their solemn will before a notary, without the need for surgeries or a judicial order. On June 4, 2015, the Colombian government issued Decree 1227 to simplify this process for adults aged 18 and older. The decree, signed by the Ministry of Justice and the Ministry of the Interior, says the gender change is justified by a person's individual choice and removes the requirement for medical examinations.

==== Costa Rica ====
In 2016, a bill was introduced to Costa Rica's Legislative Assembly to allow transgender individuals to legally change their name and gender without requiring surgery or judicial permission. By June 2017, the bill advanced to the Human Rights Committee, and the Supreme Electoral Tribunal endorsed it, but it ultimately failed to pass.

In January 2018, following a ruling by the Inter-American Court of Human Rights and the 2018 Costa Rican general election, President Carlos Alvarado Quesada issued an executive decree mandating that all state institutions allow transgender individuals to modify their documents and internal records, including passports, driving licenses, ID cards, work permits, university identifications, based on self-declaration. In December 2018, President Alvarado signed an additional executive order extending this right to immigrants.

==== Cuba ====
In July 2025, the National Assembly passed a law allowing people to change their gender and surnames in the national civil registry without reassignment surgery.

==== Ecuador ====
Since 2016, Ecuadorians have been allowed to change the sex marker on their personal identity documents to a "gender" marker, choosing either masculine or feminine. Applicants seeking this change on their identity card must present two witnesses. Changing the sex marker in the civil registry requires a judicial order.

==== Mexico ====
Federal entities of Mexico recognising gender self-identification as of 2022

As a federation, Mexico's legal gender recognition procedures vary by state.

On 13 November 2014, the Legislative Assembly of Mexico City unanimously (46–0) approved a gender identity law. This law simplified the process for transgender individuals to change their legal gender. Under its provisions, individuals only need to notify the Civil Registry of their wish to update the gender information on their birth certificates, without requiring sex reassignment surgery, psychological therapy, or any medical diagnosis. The law took effect in early 2015.

As of November 2024, 22 other states have enacted similar laws, including Michoacán (2017), Nayarit (2017), Coahuila (2018), Hidalgo (2019), San Luis Potosí (2019), Colima (2019), Oaxaca (2019), Tlaxcala (2019), Chihuahua (2019), Sonora (2020), Jalisco (2020), Quintana Roo (2020), Puebla (2021), Baja California Sur (2021), the State of Mexico (2021) Morelos (2021), Baja California (2022), Sinaloa (2022), Zacatecas (2022), Yucatán (2024), and Campeche (2024).

==== United States ====
As the United States is a federation, legal gender recognition laws vary by state. As of July 2021, 21 states and the District of Columbia allow the gender marker on driver's licenses to be updated based on self-declaration. As of April 2020, 10 states permit the gender marker on birth certificates to be updated on the same basis. At the federal level, between June 2021 and January 2025, the gender marker on U.S. passports has been based on a system of self-identification; this was subsequently rolled back following the second inauguration of Donald Trump and Executive Order 14168.

In 2017, the California State Legislature passed the Gender Recognition Act (SB 179), eliminating the requirement for a physician's statement and mandatory court hearing for gender change petitions. The Act allows changes based on an affidavit and introduced a third, non-binary gender marker for California birth certificates, driver's licenses, and identity cards.

==== Uruguay ====
Since 2019, transgender people in Uruguay have been able to self-identify their gender and update their legal name without judicial approval, following the enactment of the Comprehensive Law for Trans Persons (Spanish: Ley Integral Para Personas Trans). The law does not require medical intervention to change one's gender on official documents.

=== Asia ===
==== India ====
In India, the Supreme Court affirmed the right to self-determination in two 2014 cases.

The Transgender Persons (Protection of Rights) Act, 2019 recognizes the right to self-perceived gender identity, allowing transgender individuals to register under a third gender (transgender). Applications must be submitted to the District Magistrate, who can issue a certificate of identity as a Transgender Person and update official documents (Sections 5-6). Identification as male or female requires proof of gender confirmation surgery or medical intervention (Section 7).

The Transgender Persons (Protection of Rights) Rules, 2020 simplified the procedure for obtaining an identity certificate from the District Magistrate. Under these rules, a single form can be used to declare either transgender or trans-binary status, though medical intervention is required for the latter. In November 2020, the Ministry of Social Justice and Empowerment launched an online portal for gender marker changes. Through this portal, applicants submit an affidavit self-declaring their third gender and can receive a new identity card within 30 days.

==== Nepal ====
In 2007, in the Sunil Babu Pant and Others v. Nepal Government court case on LGBT+ rights, the Supreme Court of Nepal legally established a gender category called "other". The Supreme Court stated that the criteria for identifying one's gender is based on the individual's self-identification.

Nepal's gender recognition laws have faced criticism for their limitations. These laws only allow individuals to change their gender marker from "M" (male) or "F" (female) to "O" (other). They do not permit transgender women to obtain an "F" marker or transgender men to obtain an "M" marker.

==== Pakistan ====
Under the Transgender Person (Protection of Rights) Act 2018 (Urdu: مُتَجَنَّس افراد کے لیے (تحفظ حقوق) قانون 2018ء), Pakistanis are allowed to self-identify their gender as male, female, both, or neither. They may express their gender according to their own preferences and have their chosen gender identity reflected on official documents, including National Identification Cards, passports, driver's licenses, and educational certificates.

=== Europe ===
Countries in Europe recognising either self-identification based on a court's ruling (France, Greece) or full gender self-identification (the other countries coloured in orange)

As of November 2024, 12 countries have established legal gender recognition procedures based on self-determination: Belgium, Denmark, Finland, Germany, Iceland, Ireland, Luxembourg, Malta, Norway, Portugal, Spain and Switzerland. In France and Greece, court permission is required. In 2014, Amnesty International reported that "many transgender people in Europe continue to struggle to have their gender legally recognised" and advocated that transgender individuals "should be able to obtain legal gender recognition through quick, accessible and transparent procedures and in accordance with their own perceptions of gender identity."

==== Belgium ====
In 2017, the Belgian federal parliament passed a law enabling individuals to change their legal gender through a statutory declaration, without requiring medical intervention. The process involves signing a statutory declaration before a civil officer, followed by a three-month waiting period, after which a second statutory declaration is required to confirm the change.

==== Cyprus ====
In 2019, a bill was drafted to allow transgender individuals to change their legal sex. The proposed legislation would grant transgender people over the age of 18 the right to change their legal gender based on self-determination, without requiring medical intervention. As of October 2021, the bill was still in draft status.

==== Denmark ====
In June 2014, the Danish Parliament voted 59–52 to remove the requirement for a mental disorder diagnosis and surgery with irreversible sterilization for legal gender changes. Since 1 September 2014, Danes aged 18 or older can apply for a legal gender change by stating their intent, followed by a six-month "reflection period" to confirm the request.

==== Finland ====
In 2021, a Finnish citizen's initiative to base legal gender recognition on self-determination gathered 50,000 signatures and was referred to the Finnish Parliament's Committee on Social Affairs and Health. Prime Minister Sanna Marin had previously expressed support for self-determination. On 1 February 2023, Finland's Parliament approved gender self-identification by a vote of 113–69.

==== Germany ====
In June 2021, Germany's parliament rejected two self-identification bills. One of the bills proposed allowing gender-affirming care for children starting at age 14, regardless of parental objection, and included a €2,500 fine for misgendering.

Following the 2021 German federal election, the Scholz cabinet announced plans to introduce legal gender recognition via self-declaration. The government formally proposed a self-determination bill in June 2022. In April 2024, Germany's parliament passed the Selbstbestimmungsgesetz, permitting German citizens to change their gender on government documents through self-declaration. The law, which took effect in November 2024, allows individuals aged 16 to 18 to change their gender on documents with parental involvement. For individuals under 16, parents can initiate the change on behalf of their child.

==== Iceland ====
In 2019, Icelandic Prime Minister Katrín Jakobsdóttir proposed a bill for gender recognition via statutory declaration. The Althing passed the bill by a vote of 45–0, with three abstentions.

==== Ireland ====
On 15 July 2015, the Oireachtas passed the Gender Recognition Act 2015, allowing Irish citizens to change their gender on government documents through self-determination. The law does not require medical intervention or state assessment. Individuals aged 18 or older who are ordinarily resident in Ireland or registered in Irish birth or adoption registers can make these changes. For individuals aged 16 to 18, a court order is required to exempt them from the minimum age requirement.

In late January 2018, over 1,000 Irish feminists, including groups such as the University College Dublin Centre of Gender, Feminisms & Sexualities, signed an open letter condemning a planned meeting in Ireland on UK Gender Recognition Act reforms organized by a British group opposed to the reforms. The letter stated that "Trans people and particularly trans women are an inextricable part of our feminist community" and accused the British group of colonialism.

==== Malta ====
Under the Gender Identity, Gender Expression and Sex Characteristics Act (Maltese: Att dwar l-Identità tal-Ġeneru, l-Espressjoni tal-Ġeneru u l-Karatteristiċi tas-Sess), enacted in April 2015, applicants can change their official documents by filing an affidavit with a notary. The law eliminates any requirement for medical gender reassignment procedures.

==== Norway ====
On 18 March 2016, Norway's Solberg Government introduced the Gender Recognition Act, which allows individuals aged 16 or older to legally change their gender without psychiatric or psychological evaluation, diagnosis, or medical intervention. Minors aged 6–16 can transition with parental consent. The bill passed Parliament on 6 June by a vote of 79–13. It was promulgated on 17 June and took effect on 1 July 2016. The act was praised as a milestone for LGBTIQ+ rights by the Norwegian Organisation for Sexual and Gender Diversity, Amnesty International and by the feminist movement, notably by the Norwegian Association for Women's Rights.

==== Portugal ====
In May 2016, the Left Bloc introduced a bill to allow legal gender change solely based on self-determination. Similar bills were introduced by the People–Animals–Nature party and the Costa Government in November 2016 and May 2017, respectively. They were merged into one measure by a parliamentary committee and subsequently approved by the Parliament on 13 April 2018.

President Marcelo Rebelo de Sousa vetoed the bill. Later in 2018, adopted a revised version of the bill, incorporating changes suggested by the president regarding gender changes for minors aged 16 and 17, as suggested by the president. President Rebelo de Sousa signed the amended bill on 31 July 2018.

It was published as Act No. 38/2018 in the official journal on 7 August 2018 and took effect the next day on 8 August.

==== Spain ====
Spain passed gender self-identification in February 2023, via the Ley Trans passed by the Congress of Deputies. The draft had been in the making since 2021.

The law sets a minimum age of 14 for legal gender recognition, with parental approval required for those aged 14 to 16. A previous bill giving children total freedom of legal gender recognition had been rejected in May.

Some LGBTQ+ campaigners criticized the new bill for its age restrictions and the lack of provisions for non-Spanish residents and non-binary identities. A collective of around 50 gender-critical feminist groups opposed the bill.

==== Sweden ====
In 2015, the Löfven Government introduced a bill allowing legal gender changes without psychiatric or psychological evaluation or diagnosis, and without medical intervention. The bill stagnated in early drafts for several years. In November 2021, the Swedish government announced that it had prepared a new draft bill that would implement self-determination by 2024. A 2021 study by Sifo and commissioned by RFSL found that 61% of Swedes supported moving to a system of self-declaration. A Fokus Novus poll showed low overall support, with 15% in favor.

In July 2025 Sweden passed a renewed Legal Gender Recognition Act. A notable change is that you now no longer need a medical diagnosis of gender dysphoria to change your legal gender, but instead only need a statement from a healthcare professional.

==== Switzerland ====
In May 2018, the Swiss Federal Council proposed an amendment to allow individuals to change their registered legal sex and first name(s), requiring only a declaration to civil status registry officials.

In late 2020, the Swiss Parliament passed the bill, permitting individuals aged 16 and older to obtain legal sex change by self-declaration. The law took effect on 1 January 2022 and was enacted through a modification of the Swiss Civil Code. The Swiss civil registry stores a person's legal sex, which is binary, and Swiss federal ID cards and passports reflect the entry made at the civil registry. No Swiss governmental agency registers residents' gender, gender identity, gendered expression, or similar.

==== United Kingdom ====
Excluding Northern Ireland, the Equality Act 2010 provides protection from discrimination under the protected characteristic of "gender reassignment". This protection covers individuals at any stage of the transition process, from proposing to reassign their gender to undergoing or completing the process. However, this is not equivalent to gender self-identification, and the Act permits providers of sex-segregated services to exclude transgender individuals on a case-by-case basis if it constitutes "a proportionate means of achieving a legitimate aim."

In 2016, the House of Commons' Women and Equalities Committee issued a report recommending that the Gender Recognition Act 2004 be updated "in line with the principles of gender self-declaration". Later in 2016, in England and Wales, a proposal was developed under Theresa May's government to revise the Act to introduce self-identification. The proposal was dropped in 2020 after opposition. Instead, Boris Johnson's government reduced the application fee for a Gender Recognition Certificate to £5 and moved the application process online.

In 2018, a YouGov poll for PinkNews found that 18% of respondents across the UK supported self-identification, 58% believed medical approval was necessary, and the remainder were undecided.

A 2018 government consultation on the Gender Recognition Act reform received 102,833 submissions. Of these, 39% were submitted via an online form set up by Stonewall, 18% via a form by the gender-critical group Fair Play for Women, and 7% via a form by the feminist organization Level Up. The consultation showed that 64% supported removing the requirement for a gender dysphoria diagnosis, 80% favored eliminating the need for a medical report, and 77% supported removing the requirement to provide evidence of living "in their acquired gender" for a set period.

In 2020, Human Rights Watch urged the British government to allow self-identification and include recognition of transgender and non-binary individuals. In March 2021, the Welsh government's Independent LGBTQ+ Expert Panel also called for reform based on self-determination principles. Later that year, the Welsh government advocated for the devolution of powers related to the Act to enable legislative reforms within Wales.

On 22 December 2022, the Scottish Parliament passed the Gender Recognition Reform Bill by a vote of 86 to 39. The bill proposed allowing self-identification for a Gender Recognition Certificate and extending the process to individuals aged 16 and 17. On 17 January 2023, the United Kingdom government used section 35 of the Scotland Act 1998 to block the bill from receiving royal assent, the first time section 35 has been used. After the Scottish Parliament vote, Mark Drakeford, First Minister of Wales, expressed a desire for a similar reform of gender-recognition law in Wales and the legislative competence for the Senedd to enact it; he described Westminster's section 35 order as a "very dangerous precedent" for devolution.

=== Oceania ===
==== Australia ====
In Australia, Tasmania implemented self-declaration in 2019. In 2020, the Tasmania Law Reform Institute completed an investigation of the law's impact that "uncovered no evidence that allowing people to change their officially recorded gender would have any unforeseen legal consequences." Later in 2019, the Parliament of Victoria introduced a law that abolished the sex reassignment surgery requirement for legal gender change and allows applicants to self-nominate the sex listed on their birth registration as male, female, or any other gender diverse or non-binary descriptor of their choice.

==== New Zealand ====
In New Zealand, gender markers on passports and drivers' licences have worked on a self-declaration basis since 2012. In November 2017, the New Zealand Parliament introduced the Births, Deaths, Marriages, and Relationships Registration Bill to allow people to change the sex on their birth certificates on a self-declaration basis as well. The bill passed its first reading in December 2017 and passed its second reading in August 2021. The bill was unanimously approved by Parliament on its third reading and went into effect in 2023. The Human Rights Commission has supported the bill, stating that it would "ultimately help reduce discrimination." The bill has also been supported by the Māori Women's Welfare League and the National Council of Women of New Zealand.

== Academic research ==
A 2019 paper in International Journal of Environmental Research and Public Health reported that legal gender recognition frameworks based on medicalization can have negative effects on transgender and intersex individuals. A 2018 study in BMC International Health and Human Rights stated that in countries where transgender people are denied legal recognition of their gender identity, this often leads to further human rights violations, impacting access to education, employment, healthcare, social security, and legal protection. The study also noted that many countries permitting gender marker changes impose abusive requirements, such as forced or involuntary surgery, medical diagnoses, and lengthy, costly judicial procedures. A 2017 study in Critical Social Policy reported that legal requirements based on trans-related diagnoses may inadvertently reintroduce surgical and hormonal practices as prerequisites, acting as gatekeepers to healthcare services and citizenship rights.

Sex/gender self-determination has entered the international public consciousness due to media commentary, governmental debates, and rapid legal and policy changes regarding trans and intersex individuals in law and medicine.

A 2020 study from the University of Bristol found that allowing legal gender changes without requiring medical diagnosis or treatment could significantly improve the experience of older transgender individuals transitioning later in life. A 2021 study in Labour Economics demonstrated that the removal of surgical requirements for legal gender recognition is associated with a 9–20% increase in the employment rate for female-to-male transgender individuals.

Research has also highlighted that self-identification laws alone may not address all issues faced by transgender people, especially if such laws maintain binary gender frameworks or lack accompanying reforms in areas like healthcare. A 2018 analysis by Chris Dietz of the University of Leeds on Denmark's legal gender recognition system noted that recognition may be practically inaccessible without corresponding healthcare provisions. Positivity around Denmark's law was mitigated by reforms centralizing transgender healthcare under the Sexological Clinic at Copenhagen's National Hospital, effectively creating a monopoly on treatment authorization.

Legal gender recognition laws based on self-declaration may also fail to guarantee universal access to proper identity documentation. A 2014 study on Argentina's law found that uptake of new IDs was uneven, with foreign-born status significantly correlating with lower access. A 2021 paper in the Journal of Human Rights reported that in India, many authorities claim ignorance of legal processes, denying transgender individuals' applications for identity documents due to procedural misunderstandings.

A 2020 paper in the Modern Law Review argued that proposed reforms to the UK's Gender Recognition Act would not erode existing Equality Act 2010 exemptions permitting reliance on sex over gender identity, nor would they significantly increase harm to cisgender women. A 2017 paper by Peter Dunne of Trinity College Dublin found no substantial support for claims that trans protections facilitate cisgender predators feigning trans identities to perpetrate assaults in women-only spaces. Instead, such concerns often stem from transphobia and long-standing tropes about transgender individuals as "deviant" or "deceptive". A 2018 study by the Williams Institute concluded that passing non-discrimination laws based on self-declared gender identity does not correlate with an increase in criminal incidents in public spaces like restrooms and changing rooms, and fears of safety violations stemming from such laws are not supported by empirical evidence.

== See also ==
- Feminist views on transgender topics
- Legal recognition of non-binary gender
- Legal status of transgender people
- Right to personal identity
- Transgender people in sports
- Gender marker
