= Alison Phipps =

Alison Phipps may refer to:

- Alison Phipps (sociologist), British political sociologist, gender studies scholar and feminist theorist
- Alison Phipps (refugee researcher), professor of refugee research, language and intercultural studies
