= Talat Yaqoob =

Scottish writer

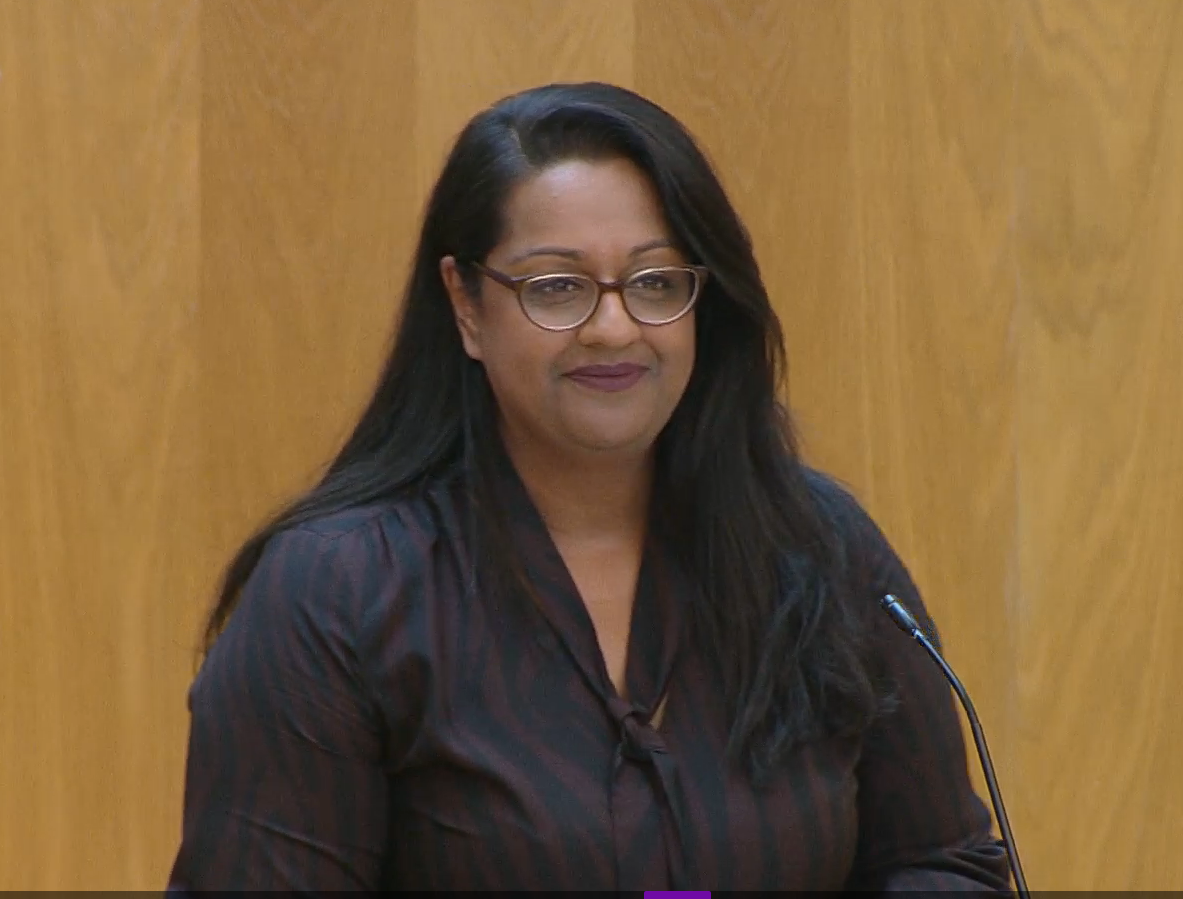
- Talat Yaqoob in 2023
- Occupations: Commentator, researcher and activist
- Years active: 2008–present
- Movement: Women's equality, anti-racism, social justice
- Board member of: Women 50:50, First Minister’s National Advisory Council on Women and Girls, Anti-Racism Governance Group
- Awards: Outstanding Women of Scotland Award

Talat Yaqoob is a Scottish campaigner, researcher, writer and commentator focused on women's equality, anti-racism, and intersectional analysis of policy.

== Early life and education ==
Yaqoob was educated at Heriot-Watt University where she studied psychology, and earned her master's degree in political research at the University of Edinburgh with a focus on public participation.

== Career and activism ==
She is an independent consultant, researcher, and commentator. She launched Pass the Mic in October 2019, an organisation which hosts the first and only directory of women of colour experts in Scotland and which conducts campaigning and research to challenge under-representation and misrepresentation in media and influencing. She was the director of Equate Scotland from 2016 to 2020, working on women's equality across the science, technology, engineering and mathematics (STEM) sectors. During this time she conducted and published the first intersectional analysis of women's experiences in STEM in Scotland She was co-founder and chair of the cross-party campaign group Women 50:50. She is also a member of the First Minister’s Advisory Council on Women and Girls since 2017 and was co-chair of this council between 2022 - 2026 with Anna Ritchie Allan. She is a member of Gender Equal Media Scotland and the Royal Society of Edinburgh's Post-COVID-19 Futures Commission.

In 2026, she co-authored an anthology titled "Building A Feminist Nation; Scotland in the era of poly-crisis" published as open access by Scottish Universities Press.

== Awards and fellowships ==
In 2017 Yaqoob was awarded the Best Blog and Comment category of the Write to End Violence Against Women Awards for her blog 'Just Ignore it'. She was awarded 2018 Outstanding Women of Scotland award from the Saltire Society.

She was made a Fellow of the Royal Society of Edinburgh in 2020 and a mural of her was sited in Edinburgh as part of a celebration of women in STEM in 2021

In 2025, Yaqoob was awarded an honorary doctorate by Edinburgh Napier University for her extensive work across social justice issues.
