= Women 50:50 =

Scottish campaign for gender equality in public life

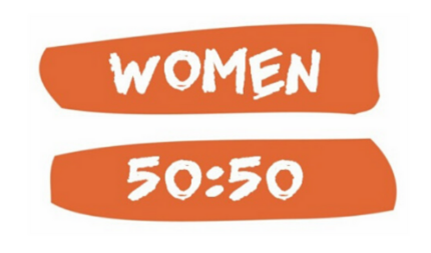
- Women 50:50 Logo
- Formation: September 2014; 11 years ago
- Type: Campaign
- Purpose: Gender equality, Campaigning
- Headquarters: Edinburgh
- Region served: Scotland
- Chair: Talat Yaqoob
- Website: www.facebook.com/women5050/

Women 50:50 is the campaign for legislated candidate quotas and fair representation of women in Scottish public life, including as political representatives and public board members.

== History ==
The campaign was co-launched by a cross-party group of representatives in September 2014; the Scottish Green’s member of the Scottish Parliament, Alison Johnstone, the SNP member of the Scottish Parliament Marco Biagi, and the Scottish Labour member of the Scottish Parliament Kezia Dugdale. The campaign was also founded and led by feminist activists including Talat Yaqoob, Emma Ritch, and Meryl Kenny.

The campaign focused on legislated candidate quotas which would enforce a requirement for all political parties in local and national elections in Scotland to field at least 50% women candidates to achieve gender balance in politics, as well as pushing for a legislated requirement for public boards to appoint at least 50% women.

The campaign built on the work by trade union women during the creation of the Scottish Parliament in 1999 who called for fair representation of women in the first session of the newly devolved parliament.

== Actions ==
The Women 50:50 campaign focused on gaining the support of political party leaders to endorse the campaign and call for legislated candidate quotas; the campaign was successful in gaining the support of the SNP, the Scottish Labour Party, and the Scottish Greens.

In November 2015 the campaign hosted its first national conference to bring together supporters and allies, pushing forward the cause. Former First Minister, Nicola Sturgeon, was the keynote speaker at the conference, and used the opportunity to announce her endorsement of the campaign, and that her Government will be taking forward legislation to ensure public boards in Scotland will appoint at least 50% women.

From 2016, the campaign moved from seeking not only 50% women candidates by political parties, but pushing for change within the culture of political parties and focusing on the allocation of perceived winnable seats. By this point, according to the campaign leaders, the campaign had moved the discussion about women’s representation into the spotlight of political discourse.

In 2017, the campaign won the Herald/GenAnalytics awards for the “Best Diversity Marketing and Social Issues Campaign”.

The campaign has had significant media coverage and influence, speaking to the BBC podcast, pod-litical ahead of the 2021 Scottish Parliament elections, the chair of the campaign, Talat Yaqoob, stated that the campaign has been influential in increasing the number of women members of the Scottish Parliament, and in creating an expectation of political parties.

The campaign has also focused on tackling sexism and discrimination within politics and public life, calling for parties to take more serious action against sexist behaviour and to do more to support disabled women, women of colour, and working class women into politics.

In 2018 the Scottish Parliament passed legislation to require equal representation of women on public sector boards in Scotland.
