= Kim Pérez =

Spanish teacher and trans rights activist (1941–2025)

- Born: 1941; Granada, Spain
- Died: 27 February 2025 (aged 83)
- Education: University of Granada
- Occupations: Teacher, activist
- Political party: United Left

Kim Joaquina Pérez Fernández-Fígares (1941 – 27 February 2025) was a Spanish teacher and trans rights activist who was the first trans woman to take part in an electoral candidacy in Spain.

== Biography ==
Kim Pérez was born in Granada in 1941. She earned a licentiate in history from the University of Granada, and taught ethics and philosophy there from 1968 to 1970 and from 1976 to 2006.

She was a teacher at various educational levels. She was also a communications attachée at the Spanish embassy in Algeria. Pérez came out as a trans woman in 1991, at age 50. She was co-founder and president of the Gender Identity Association in Andalusia, and of the collective Conjuntos Difusos-Autonomía Trans.

In 1999, while Pérez was serving as president of the Gender Identity Association, Andalusia became the country's first autonomous community to include gender affirming care and surgeries in its catalog of health services. In 2007, she was number 17 on the electoral list of the United Left in municipal elections for the Granada City Council, becoming the first trans woman to be part of an electoral candidacy in Spain.

In 2010, Pérez demanded that the government add an option for a neutral gender on official documents. In 2013, she chained herself to the doors of the Andalusian Parliament and began a hunger strike to protest a delay in the approval of the Comprehensive Transsexuality Law. In 2019, she again went on a hunger strike to denounce far-right support for the Regional Government of Andalusia, saying that the Vox party's platform could result in a reduction in the rights of trans people.

Pérez died on 27 February 2025, at the age of 83.

== Awards and recognition ==
- 2010 – FELGTBI+ Pen Award
- 2017 – Gold medal of merit from the city of Granada
- 2017 – "Seniors of the Year" winner from the Ayuntamiento de Granada
- 2018 – Herald of Granada's LGBT Pride Day
- 2019 – COGAM Pink Triangle Award
