= Equate Scotland =

Scottish organization

Equate Scotland is a Scottish government-funded national organisation with the strategic objectives of tackling underrepresentation of women and gender inequality in science, technology, engineering, environment (natural and built) and mathematics (STEM). Founded in 2006 as the Scottish Resource Centre for Women in Science, Engineering and Technology; it rebranded in 2014 to Equate Scotland. The programme is hosted by Edinburgh Napier University with the objective of increasing participation and advancement of women in STEM through training, advocacy, partnerships with employers and higher education institutions, active research and building peer to peer networks.

== History ==
=== Origins (2004–2005) ===
Equate Scotland has its origins in the UK Resource Centre for Women in Science, Engineering and Technology (UKRC), which was launched in 2004 as one of the key recommendations of the UK Government's 2003 Strategy for Women in SET, following the 2002 SET Fair Report. Funded by the newly created Department for Business, Innovation and Skills (BIS), the UKRC was established as the Government’s lead organisation for providing advice, services, and policy consultation on the under-representation of women in science, engineering, and technology. In 2005, the Scottish Resource Centre was established to deliver the UKRC’s mission in Scotland through a partnership between Edinburgh Napier University, the University of Glasgow, and Glasgow Caledonian University.

=== Establishment and Early Years (2006–2011) ===
The Scottish Resource Centre began operating from Edinburgh Napier University in 2006, providing mentoring programmes, return-to-work initiatives, and employer engagement events aimed at improving gender diversity in STEM workplaces. The Centre now received funding from the Scottish Funding Council, the European Social Fund, and other partners.

=== Transition and rebranding (2012–2014) ===
In 2012, following the conclusion of the UKRC’s national contract, the Scottish Government allocated funding directly to the Centre, supporting a uniquely Scottish model of gender equality intervention in STEM higher education and labour market. In 2014, the Centre rebranded to Equate Scotland to enhance visibility and strengthen its identity.

=== Recent developments (2015–present) ===
- From 2016 to 2020, with Talat Yaqoob the programme Director, Equate Scotland launched the Equate Career Hub, expanded the Equate Student Network (formerly Interconnect), conducted the first of its kind intersectional analysis of women's representation and experiences in STEM, launched the "I am a STEMinist" campaign, developed a bespoke training and consultancy offer for employers and education institutions, building a pan-European collaboration on tackling gender inequality in STEM within SMEs funded through Erasmus Plus, and led to further national initiatives promoting women’s participation in STEM.
- From 2020 to 2022, under Lesley Laird’s Directorship, Equate Scotland underwent a digital transformation during the COVID-19 pandemic and launched new initiatives with a focus on intersectionality.
- Since 2022, under the leadership of Programme Director Dilraj Sokhi Watson, Equate Scotland has delivered several key initiatives. These include the research and publication of the experiences of women in STEM in Scotland report, a collaborative partnership with Polibatam Polytechnic in Indonesia on gender inclusion initiatives, and the development of an award-winning, multi-partner employability programme supporting Ukrainian women displaced by the war. In response to the closure of the CareerHub, a new suite of market-responsive activities was launched. One of the key highlights in 2025 was the launch of Equate Scotland’s peer to peer network Friends of Equate. The network was created for women in STEM to help them find community, access peer-to-peer support, and take part in further training opportunities. It also runs in-person and online events throughout the year. Additionally, Equate has undertaken significant policy and development work on the thematic areas of gender, skills and net zero.

== Impact ==
Equate Scotland reports that over 85% of student participants improve their skills and confidence, with many gaining employment or industry placements. The programme contributes to national policy consultations and has influenced equality practices in both education and industry sectors in Scotland.

== Governance and funding ==
Equate Scotland is hosted by Edinburgh Napier University and funded primarily by the Scottish Government. The programme therefore follows the policies and procedures of the university. It has received funding from various sources, including the UKRC, the Scottish Funding Council, the European Social Fund, and the Scottish Government.

Equate Scotland is governed by a steering committee with members from academia, commercial STEM sectors such as construction, engineering and manufacturing, technology, the third sector, and the public sector. The steering committee is responsible for setting and guiding the team on the strategic goals of the programme, through advice and input.

== See also ==
- Women in STEM
- Gender equality in workplace
- Edinburgh Napier University
