= Eva Simone Hayward =

Professor of gender and women studies

Eva Hayward

Academic background
- Education: University of California, Santa Cruz
- Thesis: Envisioning Invertebrates and Other Aquatic Encounters (2007)
- Doctoral advisor: Donna Haraway

Academic work
- Main interests: Gender and Women Studies

Eva Simone Hayward is a writer, a Fulbright Scholar (Austria) and a transdisciplinary faculty member of the Department of Gender Studies at the Utrecht University. Her work develops new ground, examining the role of visual representation in scientific knowledge, with particular attention to animal studies, psychoanalysis, ecology, aesthetic philosophy, and sexuality studies.

== Education and career ==
Hayward's research interests include aesthetics, environmental and science studies, and sexuality studies.

Hayward completed a B.A. in American Studies (summa cum laude) at the University of New Mexico (UNM) in 2001. She graduated in 2008 from the University of California, Santa Cruz (UCSC) with M.A. and Ph.D. degrees in History of Consciousness, advised by Donna Haraway. After she completed her doctorate, she worked as a research assistant at the Long Marine Laboratory.

Hayward was a post doctoral fellow for Women's Studies at Duke University.

She was an assistant professor for Cinematic Arts and helped to design the Interdisciplinary Film and Digital Media Program at the University of New Mexico. While she was on leave as a guest researcher at the Centre for Gender Research at Uppsala University, Sweden, her colleagues at UNM cited her achievements in the department's program review, including her coordination of Sweden's "first-ever international conference on animality and visual culture". Ester Ehnsmyr of Uppsala University said of her work, "Hayward has helped to develop new ground for transdisciplinary work – mixing art and visual representation with zoontology and feminist techno-science studies."

Hayward was a visiting professor at the College of Design, Architecture, Art and Planning at the University of Cincinnati prior to joining the faculty at the University of Arizona.

== Selected publications ==
=== Journal articles ===
- Hayward, Eva S. "Don't Exist". TSQ: Transgender Studies Quarterly, 4(2), 191–194. (2017).
- Hayward Eva S. and Che Gosset. "Impossibility of That". Angelaki: Journal of the Theoretical Humanities. Vol. 22:2, pp. 15–24. (May 17, 2017).
- Hayward, Eva S. and Jami Weinstein. "Introduction: Tranimalities in the Age of Trans* Life10". TSQ: Transgender Studies Quarterly. 2. 195–208. (2015).
- Adela C. Licona and Hayward, Eva S. "Trans~Waters~ Coalitional Thinking on Art + Environment". University of Arizona’s Terrain.org: A Journal of the Built + Natural Environments. (December 17, 2014).
- Malin Ah-King and Hayward, Eva S. "Toxic Sexes: Perverting Pollution and Queering Hormone Disruption". O-zone: A Journal of Object Oriented Studies, ISSN 2326-8344, Vol. 1.(Autumn 2013).
- Lindsay Kelley and Hayward, Eva S. "Carnal Light". Parallax, 19(1), 114–127.(2013).
- Hayward, Eva S. "Sensational Jellyfish: Aquarium Affects and the Matter of Immersion" differences : A Journal of Feminist Cultural Studies v. 23 (3): 161–196. (December 1, 2012). doi: 10.1215/10407391-1892925.
- Hayward, Eva S. "T2=F2M+M2F". The Triangle: LGBTQ resource for the Raleigh, Durham and Chapel Hill area. Vol 1:10, pp. 7–8.(February 2011).
- Hayward, Eva S. "Fingeryeyes: Impressions of Cup Corals". Cultural Anthropology 25, no. 4: 577-599. (January 1, 2010).
- Hayward, Eva S. "Spider City Sex". Women & Performance: a journal of feminist theory . Vol. 20, Iss. 3.(2010). doi:10.1080/0740770X.2010.529244
- Hayward, Eva. "Transpositions (Four Incidents)". Women and Environment International p. 76-77.(2008).
- Hayward, Eva. "More Lessons from a Starfish: Prefixial Flesh and Transpeciated Selves". Women’s Studies Quarterly (2008).
- Hayward, Eva S. "Refracting The Love Life of the Octopus". Enfolded Vision, Vol.1. (Fall 2005).
- Hayward, Eva S. "The Nature-Culture Divide; or, Transdisciplining Diversity". GLQ: A Journal of Lesbian and Gay Studies. (January 1, 2005).

=== Book chapters ===
- Hayward, Eva. "Chapter 14: Lessons from a Starfish". The Transgender Studies Reader 2. Edited by Susan Stryker and Aren Z. Aizura. New York: Routledge (2012).
- Hayward, Eva. "Lessons from a Starfish". Queering the Non/Human. Noreen Giffney and Myra Hird, Eds. (London: Ashgate Press, 2008).
- Giovanni Aloi, Brandon Ballengée, Ron Broglio, Eva Hayward, Jessica Ullrich, Helen J. Bullard, and Kira O'Reilly. Antennae 10: A Decade Of Art and The Non-Human, 07-17. Giovanni Aloi, ed. (2017).

=== Newspaper columns ===
Hayward was a columnist for IndyWeek from June 2011 through February 2013, and published 20 essays as monthly columns, on topics ranging from "Why a sex change is not extraordinary" to "What Maurice Sendak taught us about facing our fears" to "Getting frank about our Frankenweather". She has also published in other popular venues such as Yes! Magazine, Women & Environments Magazine, and AEQAI. Editor Daniel Brown of AEQAI wrote to readers, "...we hope that you enjoy her brilliance and her humor as much as we do".

== See also ==
- Ecofeminism
- Technoscience
- Animal Studies
