= Elisabeth Lund Engebretsen =

Norwegian anthropologist (born 1973)

Professor Elisabeth Lund Engebretsen
- Born: 23 September 1973 (age 52)
- Scientific career
- Institutions: University of Stavanger

Elisabeth Lund Engebretsen (born 23 September 1973) is a Norwegian anthropologist and gender studies scholar. She is a full professor of gender studies at the University of Stavanger and has been a visiting senior fellow at the London School of Economics.

== Career ==
Engebretsen earned a cand.mag. in Chinese and anthropology at the University of Oslo in 1997, a master's degree in gender studies at the London School of Economics (LSE) in 2000, a master's degree in anthropology at LSE in 2003 and a PhD in anthropology at LSE in 2008. She has also studied Chinese at universities in China, where she has lived for extended periods. Her dissertation advisers were Henrietta Moore and Charles Stafford. She was a senior lecturer in gender studies at the University of Oslo until she became an associate professor of gender studies at the University of Stavanger in 2018. She was promoted to full professor in 2022. She is a visiting senior fellow at LSE.

Her research areas include gender and diversity, feminist and queer theory, social anthropology and ethnography, social movements and activism, and she has a particular focus on China and the Nordic countries. In 2022, she published a chapter on the anti-gender movement in Norway, the first scientific work on the anti-gender movement in Norway. The chapter described the anti-gender movement as a "complex threat to democracy" that "represent[s] a reactionary populist backlash to basic human rights principles," and that seeks to "demonize the very basics of trans existence."

Engebretsen was a member of the executive board of the Norwegian Organisation for Sexual and Gender Diversity from 2018 to 2020, and is active in the Green Party.

In 2020, Engebretsen took over as new editor of the peer-reviewed journal Lambda Nordica on LGBTQ studies, alongside her peer Erika Alm.
