= Journal of Human Rights =

- Discipline: Human rights
- Language: English
- Edited by: Shareen Hertel

Publication details
- History: 2002–present
- Publisher: Routledge
- Frequency: Quarterly
- Impact factor: 0.694 (2020)

Standard abbreviations
- ISO 4: J. Hum. Rights

Indexing
- ISSN: 1475-4835 (print); 1475-4843 (web)
- LCCN: 2002242106
- OCLC no.: 782076725

Links
- Journal homepage; Online access; Online archive; Journal page at University of Connecticut

The Journal of Human Rights is a quarterly peer-reviewed academic journal covering human rights studies and practices, and natural and legal rights in context of national and international law, and international relations. It is published by Routledge and is currently housed at the University of Connecticut, Storrs with Shareen Hertel as editor-in-chief. The journal was established in 2001 by founding editor-in-chief Thomas Cushman (Wellesley College).

== Abstracting and indexing ==
The journal is abstracted and indexed:

- Current Contents/Social And Behavioral Sciences
- EBSCO databases
- International Bibliography of the Social Sciences
- Modern Language Association Database
- ProQuest databases
- Scopus
- Social Sciences Citation Index

According to the Journal Citation Reports, the journal has a 2020 impact factor of 0.694.
