= Lambda Nordica =

- Discipline: Queer studies
- Language: English, Swedish, Danish, Norwegian
- Edited by: Erika Alm, Elisabeth L. Engebretsen

Publication details
- History: 1989–present
- Publisher: Lambda Nordica (Sweden)
- Frequency: 4
- Open access: Yes
- License: CC-BY-ND

Standard abbreviations
- ISO 4: Lambda Nord.

Indexing
- ISSN: 1100-2573 (print); 2001-7286 (web)

Links
- Journal homepage

Lambda Nordica is a peer-reviewed, open-access academic journal of LGBTQ studies. The journal is oldest of its kind in the Nordic region, dedicated to interdisciplinary research in lesbian/gay/bi/trans* and queer studies. It aims to foster international collaboration and dialogue, and to offer junior as well as senior researchers an opportunity to publish in both English and the Scandinavian languages. The journal also reviews Nordic and international literature in the field of LGBTQ studies.

Lambda Nordica was founded in 1989 as a regionally-based Swedish/Nordic cultural journal of homosexuality research aimed at a broader audience, but with close collaboration with the LGBT movements at the time. Göran Söderström was a notable editor-in-chief in the early years. Over time, the publication evolved and is now an academic journal aimed at researchers, teachers and students.

The journal is published in hardcopy, and, since 2012, open access online. Individual articles are assigned DOI numbers. The journal is indexed by EBSCO Information Services as part of its LGBTQ+ Source database. It is carried in over 100 libraries worldwide.

The journal primarily publishes peer-reviewed research articles, which are subject to double-blind peer review. The section We're here presents essays that address different perspectives on current issues in research and LGBTQ politics. Past contributors to We're here include Susan Stryker, Sarah Franklin, Sara Ahmed, Juana María Rodríguez and Paola Bacchetta.

The production of Lambda Nordica has long been supported by Torsten Amundsons Fond under the auspices of the Swedish Royal Academy of Sciences. Since 2014, Lambda Nordica also receives funding from the Swedish Research Council.

In 2020 the editors-in-chief were Erika Alm and Elisabeth L. Engebretsen, taking over from the previous editors Ulrika Dahl and Jenny Björklund.
