= Cambridge SCA =

Organization in Cambridge

Cambridge SCA logo

Cambridge SCA (Cambridge Student Community Action) is a registered charity which facilitates community volunteering opportunities for the students of the University of Cambridge in England. Projects typically serve the local community. Cambridge SCA runs 10 of its own 'Internal Projects', each led by student Project Leaders. These include educational projects and projects to help children and elderly people. Additionally, they offer volunteering opportunities through external organizations, such as Cambridge Carbon Footprint, Headway, and the Cambridge Rape Crisis Centre.

== History ==
Cambridge SCA became a registered charity in 1972. It is one of the longest-running student charity organizations affiliated with the University of Cambridge.

== Organization ==
Cambridge SCA is managed by a student committee, a board of trustees (including three members from the student committee), and a body of representatives. Project Leaders oversee their respective projects with support from the student committee. Two staff members handle the daily operations of the charity and serve as the first point of contact for volunteers, committee members, and community members seeking assistance from SCA projects.

Elections for the student committee occur at the Annual General Meeting, held at the end of Cambridge's Lent term.

== Internal projects ==
Cambridge SCA runs 10 internal projects:

- Children's Projects: 'Big Siblings', 'Bounce', 'Parklife', 'Craftroom'
- Educational Projects: 'Homework Help', 'Teaching English as a Second Language'
- Projects for the Elderly: 'Betty Stubbens Musical Entertainment Group', 'Saturday Club', 'Sunday Club'
- Miscellaneous: 'Taskforce' provides sporadic one-off volunteering events.

== External projects ==
SCA partners with numerous external organizations to offer volunteering opportunities for Cambridge students:

- Arts Projects: Cambridge Music Education and Outreach Group, Libra Theatre Company
- Children's Projects: Scouts, Girl guides
- Educational Projects: Cambridge Hands-On Science (ChaOS), READ International, YMCA New Deal Provision for unemployed adults.
- Environmental Projects: Botanical Gardens Education Programme, Cambridge Carbon Footprint, Cambridge Preservation Society
- Healthcare Projects: Arthur Rank House (local hospice), CAM-MIND, DHIVerse, Umbrella Autism
- Projects for the Elderly: CONTACT, St Martin's Centre
- Miscellaneous: Cambridge University Student Action For Refugees (STAR), Cambridge Women and Homelessness Group, Jimmy's Night Shelter, SOS Children's Villages
