= Erika Alm =

Swedish gender studies scholar (born 1975)

Associate Professor Erika Alm PhD
- Scientific career
- Institutions: University of Gothenburg

Erika Alm is an associate professor in gender studies and associate dean at the Faculty of Humanities at University of Gothenburg.

Since 2020, she has been co-editor of the journal Lambda Nordica on LGBTQ studies.

== Career ==
Alm wrote her dissertation in history of ideas in 2006, on the thesis "A packaging for guts and emotions": Conceptions of the body in government investigations from the 1960s and 1970s. Between 2009 and 2011 she was a postdoctoral fellow at the Umeå Center for Gender Studies at Umeå University. From 2011 she was lecturer in gender studies at the University of Gothenburg.

In 2014 she took a teaching sabbatical from the University of Gothenburg to teach at Ohio State University where she taught a course on Critical perspective on Cisnormativity.

In her research, based on feminist, political and cultural theory, she has investigated norms around body, gender and desire, especially as they appear in medical expertise and legislation, for example issues concerning abortion, sterilization and gender correction.

In 2020, Alm took over as new editor of the peer-reviewed journal Lambda Nordica on LGBTQ studies, alongside her peer Elisabeth L. Engebretsen.

== Bibliography (selection) ==
- Linander, Ida; Lundberg, Tove; Alm, Erika (2024). "The gender minority stress model and/or cisnormativity? The need for pluralistic theoretical perspectives in improving trans health and medicine". Social Science & Medicine. 351 116957. doi:10.1016/j.socscimed.2024.116957. PMID 38749253.
- Alm, Erika; Engebretsen, Elisabeth L. (2023). "Anti-gender Politics and Queer Theory". Lambda Nordica. 27 (3–4): 7–19. doi:10.34041/ln.v27.838.
- Alm, Erika; Berg, Linda; Lundahl Hero, Mikela; Johansson, Anna; Laskar, Pia; Martinsson, Lena; Mulinari, Diana; Wasshede, Cathrin, eds. (2021). Pluralistic Struggles in Gender, Sexuality and Coloniality: Challenging Swedish Exceptionalism. doi:10.1007/978-3-030-47432-4. ISBN 978-3-030-47431-7.
- Liinason, Mia; Alm, Erika (14 May 2018). "Ungendering Europe: critical engagements with key objects in feminism". Gender, Place & Culture. 25 (7): 955–962. doi:10.1080/0966369X.2018.1471049.
- "What constitutes an in/significant organ? The vicissitudes of juridical and medical decision-making regarding genital surgery for intersex and trans people in Sweden". Body, Migration, Re/constructive Surgeries. doi:10.4324/9781351133678-14. ISBN 9781351133678.
