= Alison Phipps (sociologist) =

British political sociologist, gender studies scholar

- Born: Yorkshire
- Education: University of Cambridge, University of Manchester, Elmhurst Ballet School
- Occupations: University teacher, political scientist, sociologist
- Employers: Newcastle University (2021–2025); University of Sussex (2005–2021); York St John University (2025–)
- Website: phipps.space

Alison Phipps is a British political sociologist, gender studies scholar and feminist theorist, who is professor of political sociology and Associate Head of Social Sciences, Politics and International Relations, and Religion in York St John University's School of Humanities. She is also an honorary professor in York University's Centre for Women's Studies.

== Career ==
Phipps was formerly professor of sociology at Newcastle University, and director and professor of gender studies at the University of Sussex. She was Chair of the Feminist and Women's Studies Association of the UK and Ireland from 2009 to 2012 and was one of the co-founders of Universities Against Gender-Based Violence. She is a Senior Fellow of the Higher Education Academy.

=== Research and interests ===
Phipps' research concerns feminist theory, sexual violence, racial capitalism, and institutional cultures. According to Google Scholar her work has been cited over 4,500 times. Her 2026 book Sexual Violence in Racial Capitalism contends that sexual violence plays an integral role in racial capitalist systems. Phipps argues that sexual violence is not incidental but foundational to these systems, supporting the enclosure of bodies, extraction of surplus value, and the disposal of populations deemed surplus to economic needs. The book also puts forward the concept of the coloniality of sexual violence, which argues that colonialism racialised the notion of sexual threat and instituted the idea of 'women's protection' ('women' meaning bourgeois white women) as a pretext for racist violence. Phipps understands sexual violence as a bordering project - white supremacy both enacts rampant sexual violence and projects it onto the Other, and bordering is a key dynamic through which this sexual violence is displaced.

Phipps' 2020 book Me, Not You was a critique of mainstream feminist activism against sexual violence, especially its reliance on criminal punishment, and put forward the concept of 'political whiteness' in its analysis of how the movement operates. Phipps argued that political whiteness resides in both progressive and reactionary white-dominated movements, and is characterised by a narcissistic focus on individual pain and a desire to invoke power (usually the power of the state) for redress rather than transformation. Phipps contended that the radicalism of the #MeToo movement had been hampered by political whiteness, and that this also means the mainstream feminist movement can easily become reactionary, especially as seen in the trans-exclusionary branches of feminism. 'Me, Not You' denotes that speaking out - as in #MeToo - can easily become 'speaking over.' The book was endorsed by Mariame Kaba and Mona Eltahawy and critiqued by Julie Bindel.

Phipps co-authored the 2013 National Union of Students report on 'lad culture' in UK universities and was subsequently a member of the NUS strategy group on this issue alongside Laura Bates and others. With her project Changing University Cultures, she has led interventions at Imperial College London and Sussex University, amongst other institutions, designed to tackle inequalities and issues such as bullying, harassment and violence. She worked closely with Universities UK on the issue of cultural change at universities to tackle sexual harassment and violence, before withdrawing from this relationship during the 2018 pensions strikes in protest at Universities UK's involvement in and actions on this issue.

Phipps has researched and has been active in debating the anti-gender movement and far-right attacks on LGBT rights. She is also a well-known opponent of carceral feminism and trans-exclusionary feminism, and is a supporter of sex workers' rights. As Director of Gender Studies at Sussex University, she entered a collaborative partnership with the Sex Worker Advocacy and Resistance Movement (SWARM, then named the Sex Worker Open University) and supported a campaign led by the English Collective of Prostitutes to decriminalise the sex industry.

More recently, Phipps' research has shifted towards the manosphere, in which lad culture and anti-gender politics has merged with other influences online. She has argued that the 'culture war' framing of the manosphere as an anti-feminist backlash is only part of the picture. Her research situates the manosphere within the broader conditions of economic insecurity, precarity, and inequality produced by late capitalism. 'Manfluencers' such as Andrew Tate and HSTikkyTokky profit from young men's frustrations by selling fantasies of status, wealth, and dominance over women. However, these figures operate within a larger digital system that uses outrage and resentment to keep users hooked, in order to extract data. Drawing on ideas of neofeudalism and Yanis Varoufakis's concept of technofeudalism, Phipps argues that tech billionaires (sometimes called the 'broligarchy') ultimately benefit. Alongside anti-feminist backlash, digital misogyny is part of a deeper economic system in which anger is both monetised and directed away from elite power.

=== Attacks from trans-exclusionary feminists ===
Phipps has been subject to attacks from trans-exclusionary feminists, prompted particularly by her former Sussex colleague Kathleen Stock. Stock claimed to be the target of harassment after Phipps asked colleagues to display trans flags as a gesture of solidarity, following Donald Trump's proposal to roll back the Obama-era reforms and codify gender in law as binary and determined by biological sex. Stock has described Phipps as a 'fervent transactivist' and allies of Stock have accused Phipps of being partly responsible for Stock's resignation from Sussex University.

Phipps has not spoken about this openly, but in September 2023 she told openDemocracy that other academics in her field can give her a 'wide berth' due to her outspoken stance in support of trans rights. In 2021, Phipps was interviewed by gal-dem magazine on transphobia in the VAWG (violence against women and girls) sector in the UK, and said that some members of this sector were 'living in the past', and the crusade against trans women was 'tragic.' In 2023, Open Democracy reported that Phipps had been 'a vocal trans ally for the past decade.' Phipps has linked transphobia in feminism to 'political whiteness', which is to do with privileging white, middle class and cisgender women as victims and seeing the political claims of other marginalised groups as a threat.

=== Recognition and media ===
Phipps won the 2015 FWSA Book Prize from the Feminist Studies Association for her 2014 book The Politics of the Body. Alongside her academic writing, she has been published in The Guardian, openDemocracy, the New Statesman, and Times Higher Education. She has been interviewed on Radio 4's Thinking Allowed and Woman's Hour.

== Books ==
- Women in Science, Engineering and Technology: Three Decades of UK Initiatives (Trentham Books, 2008)
- The Politics of the Body: Gender in a Neoliberal and Neoconservative Age (Polity Press, 2014)
- Me, Not You: The Trouble with Mainstream Feminism (Manchester University Press, 2020)
- Sexual Violence in Racial Capitalism (Manchester University Press, 2026)
