= Bill 2 =

Proposed Québec law

National Assembly of Quebec
- Long title: An Act respecting family law reform with regard to filiation and amending the Civil Code in relation to personality rights and civil status
- Citation: S.Q. 2022, c. 22
- Territorial extent: Quebec

Legislative history
- Introduced by: Simon Jolin-Barrette MNA, Minister of Justice
- First reading: October 21, 2021
- Second reading: February 1, 2022
- Third reading: June 7, 2022
- Status: Current legislation

The Act respecting family law reform with regard to filiation and amending the Civil Code in relation to personality rights and civil status (Note: French: Loi portant sur la réforme du droit de la famille en matière de filiation et modifiant le Code civil en matière de droits de la personnalité et d’état civil) (Bill 2, 2021) is a proposed law in the province of Québec, which would bring several changes to family law, legal recognition law, and name change law in the province.

== Summary ==
The bill would introduce a requirement for people wishing to change the sex assigned on their birth certificates to undergo genital surgery, as well as allowing people to add a new section to their birth certificates titled "Gender," which would include the possibility of a third non-male or female gender. The bill would additionally require intersex people to "apply for a change of designation of sex" as soon as possible.

The law would also create a legal framework for surrogate pregnancies, putting in place a requirement for a completed surrogacy agreement before the onset of pregnancy. It would also include provisions placing a minimum age of 21 for surrogate mothers, would allow surrogate mothers to be compensated for expenses (but not otherwise paid), a requirement for participants to attend an ethical and psychosocial information session, and would allow surrogate mothers to end the contract without risk of a lawsuit.

The law would also allow the survivors of the Canadian Indian residential school system who had their names forcibly changed and their descents to change their names to a traditional Indigenous name without cost.

== Legislative history ==
The bill was introduced to the National Assembly of Quebec by Simon Jolin-Barrette, the Coalition Avenir Québec Minister of Justice on 21 October 2021.

== Reactions ==
The bill's provisions on legal gender recognition attracted widespread concern. Members of the trans community expressed fears that it would return Québec to the legal gender recognition laws that existed before 2015, could forcibly out trans people (if they chose to add the "gender" option instead of applying to change the "sex" field), and could potentially lead to people being forced into having surgery in order to change the contents of the "sex" field. Celeste Trianon of the Centre for Gender Advocacy at Concordia University argued that the bill was "attempting to reintroduce a sterilizing surgical requirement," calling it "a direct attack on the trans community." Manon Massé, Québec solidaire co-leader, said that her party still needed to review the entirety of the bill, but that it appeared like it would move Québec "backwards in terms of the rights of trans, intersex and non-binary people." Quebec Liberal Party LGBT+ spokesperson Jennifer Maccarone stated that the provisions were a "regressive change."

== See also ==
- Transgender rights in Canada
