= Legislative Proposal for the Real and Effective Equality of Trans People =

Proposed legislation in Spain

The Legislative Proposal for the Real and Effective Equality of Trans People (122/000133) was a bill proposed to the Congress of Deputies in 2021 that would've made a number of changes to legal rights for transgender people in Spain. The bill failed to pass.

== Summary ==
The law would have amended the process of legal gender recognition in Spain away from a medicalised one that required psychiatric diagnosis, reports from three doctors, as well as court’s approval, and into a process of statutory declaration. The bill would have set the minimum age of eligibility at 16. Additionally, the bill would have offer legal recognition of non-binary identities and would have opened access to assisted reproductive technology for trans people. The bill would also have contained provisions aimed at strengthening intersex rights, notably by banning gender assignment surgery on infants.

== Legislative history ==
The bill was proposed to Congress in early February 2021 by Irene Montero, the Minister for Equality, after consultations with over 20 different LGBTQ+ and trans collectives.

On 18 May 2021, the bill was rejected by a vote of 78 for the bill and 143 against, with 120 abstentions. Unidas Podemos, the Republican Left of Catalonia–Sovereigntists as well as other Catalan parties, Ciudadanos, the Basque Nationalist Party, EH Bildu, and the Canarian Coalition voted for the bill. The People's Party, Vox, the Navarrese People's Union, and the Asturias Forum voted against the bill. The Spanish Socialist Workers' Party abstained from the vote.

== Reactions ==
The bill was described by some political commentators as opening a rift in the governing PSOE-Podemos coalition, with the latter putting forward the bill and the former refusing to support it. Although she eventually abstained from the vote, Deputy Prime Minister Carmen Calvo spoke out publicly against it, stating that it "could put at risk the identity criteria for 47 million Spaniards."

Human Rights Watch supported the bill, writing to the Spanish Prime Minister to urge him to support it, and describing the failure of the bill to pass as a "missed opportunity." Transgender Europe and the Federación Estatal de Lesbianas, Gays, Transexuales y Bisexuales also supported the bill.

On 10 March, Plataforma Trans organised a protest in front of the houses of parliament in support of the bill, with several of the group's members pledging to go on a hunger strike over the government's inaction.

The Catholic Church as well as the Confluencia Feminista opposed the bill. In April 2021, opponents vandalised the offices of the Madrid Lesbian, Gay, Bisexual and Transsexual Collective over its support for the bill.

== See also ==
- LGBT rights in Spain
