= Kvinneaktivistene =

Norwegian anti-transgender organisation

Kvinneaktivistene (lit. 'Women Activists') is a Norwegian anti-transgender group that states that it campaigns for sex-based rights and against gender ideology. It has faced protests and venue cancellations due to accusations of transphobia. It campaigns against gender self-identification and other transgender rights, and for restricting the definition of "woman" to biological women. In its political platform, Kvinneaktivistene identifies as radical feminist, grounding its outlook in a biologically essentialist conception of women, and states that "we join (…) Reem Alsalem, who states that reproductive biological sex, and not gender identity, forms the basis for (…) the definition of woman." An open letter co-signed by Kvinneaktivistene condemned gender ideology and said that "men are not women, and never will be" and "women are adult human females."

Kvinneaktivistene has hosted a series of events opposing transgender rights and has been described as transphobic. In 2023, Oslo's Kulturhuset canceled a Kvinneaktivistene event, accusing the group of transphobia. Speakers featured by Kvinneaktivistene include Anne Kalvig, who supports Donald Trump's anti-trans policies, on how she believes gender identity "conflicts with scientific thinking," and Susan Smith of British anti-trans group For Women Scotland on how Norwegian gender-critical activists could draw inspiration from the anti-transgender movement in the United Kingdom. The event drew protests, leading to a police presence as a result of the ensuing "chaos." Kvinneaktivistene said that women's rights are negatively affected by gender identity ideology. In 2025, Kvinneaktivistene called for a change in the law to recognize only biological women as women, claiming the move was needed to save women from gender identity ideology. An event organized by Kvinneaktivistene asserts that Norway is a "queer patriarchy". Kvinneaktivistene has also organized a protest against gender identity legislation outside the Spanish embassy in Oslo.

Kvinneaktivistene is gender-critical and is considered part of the anti-gender movement in Norway, with ideological ties to broader anti-gender currents internationally. Kvinneaktivistene has promoted anti-LGBTQ rhetoric and conspiracy theories associated with far-right discourse, including claims that gender ideology is a global threat and that trans women are "pervos." However it rejects the description as far right, claiming that there is a "campaign to brand women who defend their sex-based rights as far right." It is one of two main gender-critical organizations in Norway, alongside Women's Declaration International (WDI), with which it shares some positions and members, although the organizations are independent of each other. In 2024, Anne Kalvig and Christina Ellingsen wrote that WDI and Kvinneaktivistene were the only groups in Norway that had protested the recognition of trans women and transgender rights, while accusing established women's organizations of demonizing them for their anti-trans views. Kvinneaktivistene also condemned the government-appointed Extremism Commission for promoting hate speech and disinformation about radical feminism, after the Commission highlighted self-identified radical feminist actors' role in anti-transgender activism.

== History ==
Kvinneaktivistene is a breakaway group from the Women's Group Ottar, itself with roots in the Women's Front. The Women's Front had roots in the Maoist Workers' Communist Party. Historically, the name Kvinneaktivistene was used for a 1991 breakaway group from the Women's Front which then became the Bergen chapter of the Women's Group Ottar. In the 2000s, transgender people became a significant point of contention within Ottar, who at times have promoted some gender-critical beliefs, but more hardline anti-trans activists were disappointed that Ottar refused to campaign against gender self-identification or make the struggle against transgender people a priority. As a result, multiple splinter groups from Ottar and partially from the Women's Front were formed, including Women's Declaration International (WDI) and Kvinneaktivistene. Kvinneaktivistene in Bergen was founded in 2007, while Kvinneaktivistene in Oslo was founded in 2021.

== Platform and activities ==
Section 1 in Kvinneaktivistene's bylaws states that "by women we mean women". In its political platform, Kvinneaktivistene identifies as a radical feminist organization, grounding its outlook in a biologically essentialist conception of women. It describes women as a sex class, a radical feminist concept, oppressed "by virtue of being female (biological women)," endorses the gender-critical idea of sex-based rights, and states that "we join (…) Reem Alsalem, who states that reproductive biological sex, and not gender identity, forms the basis for (…) the definition of woman."

Kvinneaktivistene has hosted a series of events opposing transgender rights, featuring speakers such as Anne Kalvig (vice chair of WDI) on how she believes gender identity "conflicts with scientific thinking." Kalvig supports Donald Trump's anti-trans policies, as outlined in an article she wrote in 2025 titled "Trump for virkeligheten" ([Trump stands for reality]). The event promoted Kalvig's book Kjønnstru ([Gender religion]), where she criticizes both Ottar and the Women's Front for failing to campaign against transgender people, and the Women's Front for calling gender-critical women in Norway "transphobes, racists and sexists." Gender studies scholar Janne Bromseth wrote that "the anti-gender movement has (...) shifted boundaries in the public debate in Norway in recent years," citing Kalvig as a prominent example of anti-gender discourse, including her attacks on so-called "gender ideology." In 2024, Kalvig and Christina Ellingsen wrote that WDI and Kvinneaktivistene were the only groups in Norway that had protested the recognition of trans women and transgender rights, and accused established women's organizations of demonizing women who oppose transgender rights.

Kvinneaktivistene has also hosted events with Kajsa Ekis Ekman (co-founder of WDI Sweden) and Susan Smith of British anti-trans group For Women Scotland on how Norwegian gender-critical activists could draw inspiration from the anti-transgender movement in the United Kingdom. In 2023, the cultural venue Kulturhuset cancelled an event that had been planned by Kvinneaktivistene; the venue described the group's bylaws as transphobic for deliberately excluding transgender women. The event was focused on the detransition narrative, but Kulturhuset criticized the event for being onesided. The detransition narrative has been noted as being weaponized by anti-trans groups. Kvinneaktivistene has stated that "we are women, not transphobic". In 2025 Kvinneaktivistene said that women's rights are negatively affected by gender identity ideology and called for a change in the law to recognize only biological women as women, claiming the move was needed to save women from gender identity ideology. In 2025, Kvinneaktivistene's event featuring British anti-trans group For Women Scotland was met with protests, leading to a police presence as a result of the ensuing "chaos." At another event, ostensibly to mark the 50th anniversary of the International Women's Year, Kvinneaktivistene associated itself with the anti-trans FiLiA conference, describing itself as part of a "new women's rights struggle" and linking its own anti-trans activism to the legacy of 1970s feminism.

In 2021 Kvinneaktivistene organized a protest outside the Spanish embassy in Oslo, holding the placard "stop gender identity legislation."

Kvinneaktivistene was a signatory of a 2024 open letter against gender ideology that said that it "denounce[d] UN Women for [...] placing the concerns of a newly invented group of men seeking women's rights over the concerns of actual women," insisted that "women are adult human females" and demanded that UN Women "cease demonizing and vilifying women who know that men are not women, and never will be." The letter accused UN Women of hate speech and claimed that the description of anti-gender actors as far right is a "slur [...] intended to silence anyone critical of the wholly unproven concept of ‘gender identity’". The letter was initiated by American anti-trans group Women's Liberation Front.

Kvinneaktivistene spokesperson and former WDI Norway chair (2023–2024) Benedicte Alnæs has written that trans women are men and "pervos". In an article in Klassekampen, Alnæs and two other representatives of Kvinneaktivistene asserted that they had faced backlash for expressing their views. According to the letter, Kvinneaktivistene consists of women who have faced what they described as a "witch-hunt" over their views.

After the Norwegian government-appointed Extremism Commission cited sources that pointed to the "connections that exist between radical feminism and Christian conservativism" and how these actors "use violent and dehumanizing language, and in addition are threatening and extremely active", Kvinneaktivistene accused the Extremism Commission of distorting radical feminism and promoting disinformation and anti-democratic attitudes. Kvinneaktivistene cited Reem Alsalem, who has been criticized for transphobia by many feminist organizations, and claimed that there is a "campaign to brand women who defend their sex-based rights as far right."

In an article titled "What is a woman?", a common rhetorical question in anti-trans discourse, Kvinneaktivistene rejected Socialist Left Party politician Hege Skarrud's call for solidarity between feminists and the queer movement, claimed that "the queer organizations have broken with the women's movement" and referred to trans women as "men who feel like women."

An event organized by Kvinneaktivistene asserts that Norway is a "queer patriarchy", a term described by the gender-critical publication Gender Dissent as having been coined by WDI's Christina Ellingsen.

In 2025, Kvinneaktivistene harshly criticized the Gleditsch Project, an initiative aimed at celebrating women's history, after the project stated that "queer struggle is women's struggle" and criticized transphobia. Kvinneaktivistene argued that the project's support for trans people reflected what they described as "a highly controversial view of the definition of a woman (based on identity and feelings)." Kvinneaktivistene also condemned the Gleditsch Project for allegedly censoring women who believe "biological males are demanding rights as if they were women." The Gleditsch Project responded to the criticism by stating, "Ok, boomer."

In 2024 Kvinneaktivistene activist Benedicte Alnæs reported the leader (until 2024) of the Women's Group Ottar in Oslo to the police for hate speech after the Ottar representative had called her a "Zionist pig," invoking the old anti-semitic trope of Judensau, in a dispute over their views on the Israeli–Palestinian conflict.

== See also ==
- Anti-gender movement
- Transphobia in Norway
- Women's Declaration International
- Adult human female
- LGBTQ grooming conspiracy theory
- Anti-transgender movement in the United Kingdom
- 2020s anti-LGBTQ movement in the United States
