= Women's Group Ottar =

Norwegian radical feminist organization

The Women's Group Ottar (Norwegian: Kvinnegruppa Ottar) is a Norwegian radical feminist women's organization founded in 1991. It has its historical roots in the Norwegian Marxist-Leninist movement of the 1970s, and the women's movement of the Workers' Communist Party (that later evolved into the Red Party), and has been described as the most radical women's organization and "a final offshoot of 70s feminism". Ottar began as an offshoot of the Women's Front, and, later, it splintered again, resulting in the creation of two new groups with explicitly trans-exclusionary profiles: Women's Declaration International (WDI) Norway, and Kvinneaktivistene. The Women's Front described WDI as "transphobes". While mainly focused on combating pornography and prostitution from a feminist perspective, Ottar has also faced criticism from the Red Party, the Red Youth, LGBT+ rights groups, and others for promoting, or tolerating, anti-trans and anti-Jewish views within its ranks, and some prominent members such as Kari Jaquesson have expressed support for trans-exclusionary radical feminism (TERF), declared themselves to be TERFs, engaged in digital violence like doxxing and harassment of trans women by publishing pre-transition photos of them on the Internet, and promoted Holocaust denial. Ottar has declared Jaquesson to be "politically solidly founded in Ottar's radical feminism". The secretary of the Red Party, Benedikte Pryneid Hansen, criticized Ottar for remaining silent about transphobia within their ranks, and called upon them to clearly distance themselves from WDI. However, Ottar is best understood as a legacy radical feminist group that occasionally overlaps with gender-critical stances, but remains more ambivalent toward hard-line anti-trans politics, which has also drawn criticism from anti-trans groups and from former Ottar activists such as former Ottar board member Anne Kalvig. In 2024, Kalvig and Christina Ellingsen wrote that WDI and Kvinneaktivistene were the only groups in Norway that had protested the recognition of trans women and transgender rights, and accused established women's organizations of "demonizing" women who oppose transgender rights. In 2024, Ottar faced strong criticism when the chair of its largest chapter referred to a Jewish woman as a "Zionist pig".

== History ==
The Women's Group Ottar has its historical roots in the Norwegian Marxist-Leninist (Maoist) movement of the 1970s and the Women's Front. In 1991, the most radical and anti-pornography faction broke away from the Women's Front after disputes over views on pornography and prostitution.

The specific split was triggered by disagreements over methods of protest in the fight against pornography and what should be considered pornography. Since the 1970s, the Women's Front had used the public screening of pornographic films as a form of protest, with the idea that it would shock and upset the audience, a tactic referred to as "porn against porn." However, by the late 1980s, the leadership of the Women's Front concluded that screening pornography was harmful to the women depicted in the films and morally indefensible. They also believed that the organization's stance on pornography had become too narrow and puritanical and that the organization should not oppose milder forms of erotica. This new direction led to significant conflicts, and around 30 participants left the Women's Front's national meeting in 1991 in protest against the decisions made. The dissenting faction, which believed that screening porn was an effective form of protest and opposed the relaxation of what was considered pornography, broke away and formed the Women's Group Ottar.

They formed loosely organized groups with different names: the first breakaway group formed the original Kvinnegruppa Ottar in Stavanger, while breakaway groups from Oslo and Bergen formed Kvinnegruppa Oslo Øst and Kvinneaktivistene. From 1993, they united under the name Kvinnegruppa Ottar, named after sex educator Elise Ottesen-Jensen, also nicknamed "Ottar." The groups emphasized a flat structure and were skeptical of formal and hierarchical organization, with individual groups being autonomous and collaborating sporadically in the early years. Only in 2006 did Kvinnegruppa Ottar adopt a more formal structure with national meetings and a directly elected national board. In 2012, Ottar started the campaign "Stop Porn Culture" as a Norwegian branch of the American organization Stop Porn Culture, which was founded by Gail Dines. In the 2020s, two breakaway groups focused on anti-trans politics were founded: Women's Declaration International (WDI) Norway and Kvinneaktivistene, with a degree of overlap in membership with Ottar and the Women's Front. An open letter co-signed by Kvinneaktivistene condemned "gender ideology" and said that "men are not women, and never will be" and "women are adult human females." In 2025 Kvinneaktivistene featured former Ottar board member Anne Kalvig as a speaker, on her new book Kjønnstru in which she also criticized Ottar.

== Views ==
Kvinnegruppa Ottar is particularly focused on pornography and prostitution. In public debates, the group has strongly criticized organizations like the Norwegian Humanist Association and Amnesty International, linking them to an alleged "prostitution industry." Kristin Mile, the secretary-general of the Norwegian Humanist Association, described Ottar's claims as unworthy of serious attention. Ottar has accused queer people and the Norwegian Organisation for Sexual and Gender Diversity of working for prostitution as "a nice way to recruit young men into the gay community." Daisy Sælen Hafstad and Vegard Rødseth Tokheim described Ottar's statements about Fri and queer people as "hate speech and conspiracy theories." On behalf of Ottar, Ane Stø and Kari Jaquesson reported the state broadcasting company NRK to the police in 2015 for airing a comedy sketch where a "porn actress" had parodied Jaquesson. The report was dismissed as baseless.

=== Accusations of harassment ===
Conspiracy theorist and former television personality Kari Jaquesson has represented Ottar in several debates. In 2016 Jaquesson was criticized, e.g. by the Red Youth, for asking other women to "suck cock ten times a day." Ottar defended Jaquesson, stating that she is "politically solidly founded in Ottar's radical feminism." A survey by YouGov found that the public figures viewed most negatively by Norwegians were Donald Trump, Kari Jaquesson and Vladimir Putin. In 2019, Jaquesson was removed from the nominations for Plan Norway's Girl Award. Kari Helene Partapuoli stated that Jaquesson's views were contrary to Plan's values. She described Jaquesson's statements as "severe harassment," noting that "Plan International believes that all people must have the same rights regardless of gender, sexual orientation, ethnicity, gender identity, or religion."

=== Accusations of antisemitism ===
Some prominent members of Ottar have been accused of promoting anti-semitism. Notably, Kari Jaquesson has promoted Holocaust denial for several years.

At the parole meeting for 8 March in Oslo in 2024, Martine Votvik, who was the leader of Kvinnegruppa Ottar in Oslo until 2024, referred to a Jewish woman attending the meeting as a "Zionist pig". The statement was reported to the police as a hate speech incident, but the case was dismissed. The dismissal was criticized by the Jewish community. Following the "Zionist pig" incident at the parole meeting, Jewish women experienced being shouted at with "no Zionists in our streets" and were prevented from participating in the event by the organizers.

=== Transgender people ===
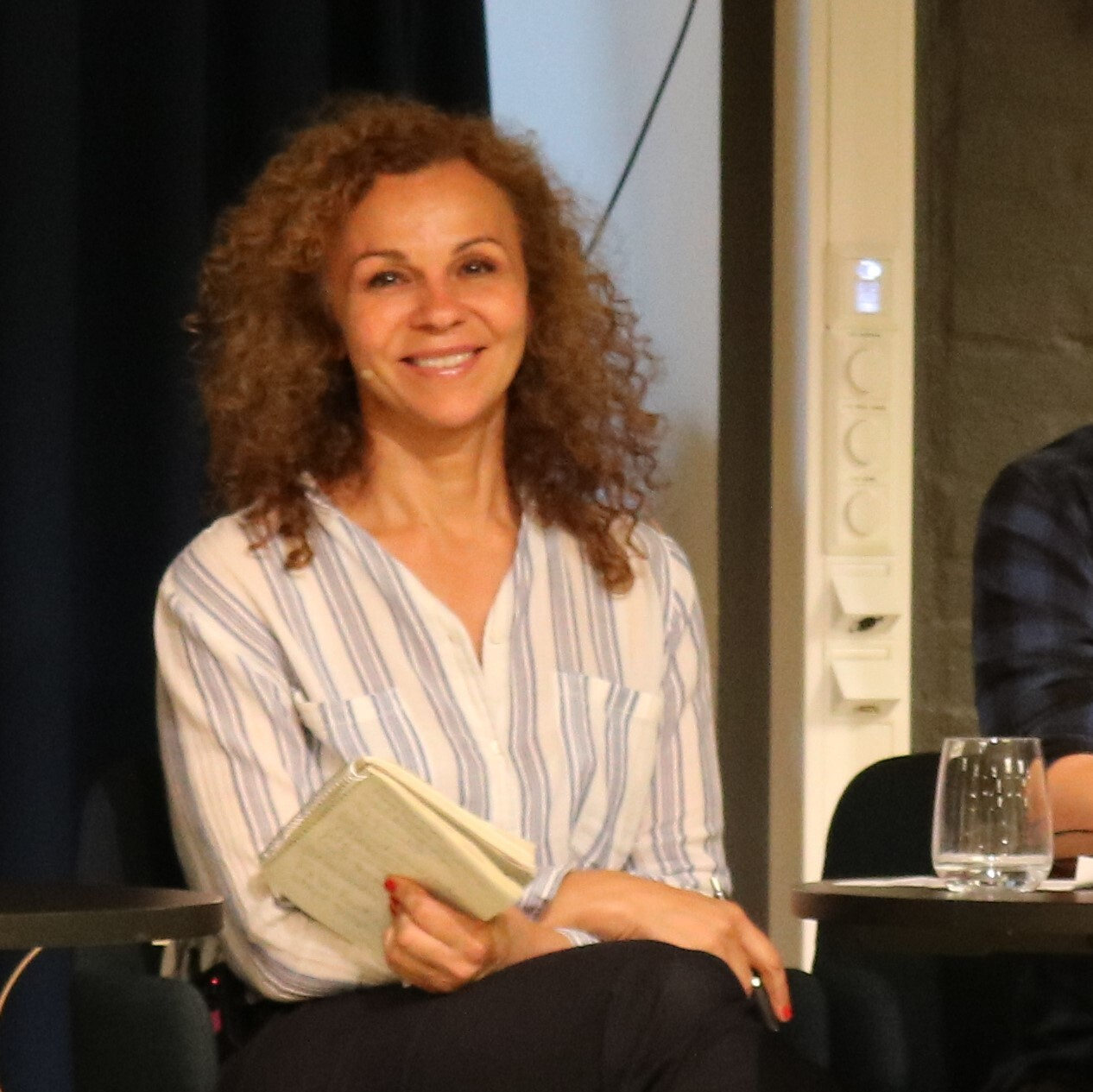
Conspiracy theorist Kari Jaquesson has represented Ottar in public debates for several years, has engaged in doxxing of trans women on the Internet and has said publicly that she considers herself to be a TERF. A YouGov survey found that the public figures viewed most negatively by Norwegians were Donald Trump, Kari Jaquesson and Vladimir Putin.

Ottar has been critical of the third wave of feminism that also emerged in the 1990s. In the debate on gender diversity, the group has often positioned itself against LGBT+ rights organizations and several members have supported trans-exclusionary radical feminism (or TERF ideology). Ottar's most widely known member for several years, conspiracy theorist Kari Jaquesson, has stated publicly that she considers herself to be a TERF and insisted that "a man can never become a woman". Jaquesson has engaged in doxxing of individual trans women, publishing pre-transition photographs, which is a form of digital violence. She has also accused individual trans people of being sexual predators. Minister of Equality Linda Hofstad Helleland condemned Jaquesson's statements, stating that "trans people are subjected to hate, violence, and harassment."

Ottar's leader Ane Stø has claimed that criticism of trans-exclusionary radical feminism constitutes a "hate campaign" against feminists. While some Ottar members have used the term as a self-description, Stø has claimed that the term trans-exclusionary radical feminism (TERF) is a "slur" that "aims to exclude feminists from public debate, by accusing us of promoting hatred against transgender people and demanding that society must be protected from our beliefs." For several years, Ottar has participated in the gender-critical FiLiA conference, which is closely linked to Women's Declaration International (WDI), with FiLiA stating that "the Radical Feminist Activist group Ottar have been incredibly supportive to FiLiA over the years". Academics describe FiLiA as part of "a veritable miasma of anti-trans campaign groups [...] united in their antipathy toward transgender people." Ottar has promoted the idea that trans people pose a threat e.g. in bathrooms. Feminists Anna-Sabina Soggiu and Susanne Demou criticized the radical feminist organizations for fostering "fabricated issues and threat scenarios" about transgender people. Women's Front board member Natasha Alijeva stated that "it is undignified when the women's movement spreads fear about a vulnerable minority." Ottar has also objected to the term "cisgender," which Rogers describes as a common theme in TERF discourse.

Ottar has received criticism from the Red Party and the Red Youth. The secretary of the Red Party, Benedikte Pryneid Hansen, criticized Ottar and the Women's Front for remaining silent about transphobia within their ranks and for their links to WDI, and called upon them to clearly distance themselves from WDI. In response, the Women's Front called WDI "transphobes, racists and sexists." The Red Youth said that "if the women's movement allows transphobes in disguise as feminists, at the expense of trans women, it is working against its own cause." In 2022, Ottar and the Women's Front were criticized for proposing that non-binary people be stripped of their voting rights at the parole meeting for the 8 March march.

Ottar has also received some criticism from more hardline anti-trans activists, who have accused Ottar of not being sufficiently anti-trans, and demanded that they make the struggle against transgender people a main priority. Former Ottar board member Anne Kalvig has strongly criticized Ottar and the Women's Front for not actively campaigning against transgender rights, and has been particularly critical of the Women's Front for labeling her group WDI as transphobes. In 2024, Kalvig and Christina Ellingsen wrote that Women's Declaration International and Kvinneaktivistene were the only groups in Norway that had protested the recognition of trans women and transgender rights, and accused established women's organizations of "demonizing" women who oppose transgender rights.

== Membership ==
Full membership with voting rights is only for women. Ottar has clarified that Kvinnegruppa Ottar's concept of women includes trans women, and that trans women can therefore be full members.

== See also ==
- Transphobia in Norway
