= Transphobia in Norway =

Prejudice against transgender people in Norway

Transphobia in Norway has evolved over time. Since the late 20th century and into the early 21st century, acceptance of transgender people has greatly increased. Norway has made significant progress in transgender rights, with strong support from political parties ranging from the left-wing Red Party to the centre-right Conservative Party. In the 2020s, Norway has seen an increase in the anti-gender movement, from both gender-critical feminist groups and the far right. Single-issue anti-trans groups such as Women's Declaration International and Kvinneaktivistene, and far-right parties such as Conservative (The Christians Party) campaign against trans rights. Recently, hate crimes against transgender people have increased. Established radical feminist groups, the Women's Front and the Women's Group Ottar, while not traditionally singularly focused on trans people, have long been criticized for promoting transphobic views. The 2024 Extremism Commission's report cited sources that pointed to "the connections between radical feminism and Christian conservatism" in relation to anti-trans activism, noting that "these are groups and individuals who use violent and dehumanizing language and are also threatening and extremely active."

== History ==
In Norway transphobia has become less common over time as social acceptance of transgender people has greatly increased and as Norway has made significant progress in transgender rights, with strong support from political parties ranging from the most left-wing to the Conservatives. In the early 21st century anti-LGBTIQ+ activism focused on opposition to marriage equality for lesbian and gay couples, and was largely confined to the Christian right, who were a dwindling minority even in the Christian landscape as the Church of Norway also moved in a more inclusive direction.

Since around 2020 Norway has seen a resurgence of anti-LGBTIQ+ activism, focused on opposition to transgender people and their rights. This wave of transphobia has been linked to anti-gender movements. In 2022 a terrorist attack targeted the Oslo LGBTQ pride event, which was hosted by the local branch of the Norwegian Organisation for Sexual and Gender Diversity. The head of the Norwegian government's Extremism Commission, Cathrine Thorleifsson, as well as Amnesty International, linked the attack to a pattern of increased attacks on LGBT+ people in Norway and Europe, both on extremist online forums and open social media platforms. In 2024 the Extremism Commission's report highlighted anti-LGBTIQ+ extremism and also cited sources that pointed to "the connections between radical feminism and Christian conservatism" in relation to anti-trans activism, noting that "these are groups and individuals who use violent and dehumanizing language and are also threatening and extremely active." Feminist scholars have described these anti-gender movements operating in the name of radical feminism in the Norwegian context as part of a "complex threat to democracy." In 2023 the University of Bergen's Centre for Women's and Gender Research hosted its annual debate on International Women's Day, that focused on the anti-gender movements in Norway, where panelists highlighted how anti-gender actors had managed to get a foothold in the radical feminist milieu in Oslo and become anchored in the local 8 March committee. In 2022 non-binary people were stripped of their voting rights at the parole meeting for the 8 March march in Oslo, leading to accusations of transphobia. Gender studies scholar Janne Bromseth argued that "the anti-gender movement has (...) shifted boundaries in the public debate in Norway in recent years," resulting in "a harsher climate of debate where primarily organized TERFs have been given space to set the agenda for the 'debate on gender' and the alleged threat of 'gender ideology' to the natural order." Far-right websites such as Document.no promote anti-trans views. Key anti-trans groups formed in the 2020s are the Norwegian branch of Women's Declaration International and Kvinneaktivistene. WDI has collaborated with far-right actors, and its spokespeople have appeared on both Document and Tucker Carlson Tonight. Another group, Sigerdriva, promotes anti-LGBTIQ+ pseudoscience and is closely linked to WDI.

Conspiracy theorist Kari Jaquesson, a member of the Women's Group Ottar, has stated publicly that she considers herself to be a trans-exclusionary radical feminist (TERF) and insisted that "a man can never become a woman." Jaquesson has engaged in doxxing of trans women, publishing pre-transition photographs. She has also accused individual trans people of being sexual predators. Conservative Party Minister of Equality Linda Hofstad Helleland condemned Jaquesson's statements, stating that "trans people are subjected to hate, violence, and harassment." Both Jaquesson and other Ottar members have promoted the false idea that trans people pose a threat e.g. in bathrooms. Researchers have described such claims as baseless and part of a transphobic moral panic that is promoted primarily by the far right, and that harms both trans and cis women. Ottar has also objected to the term "cisgender," which Rogers describes as a common theme in TERF discourse.

In late 2025, Kvinneaktivistene hosted Susan Smith of British anti-trans group For Women Scotland on how Norwegian gender-critical activists could draw inspiration from the anti-transgender movement in the United Kingdom. The event drew protests, leading to a police presence as a result of the ensuing "chaos".

In 2025 Kvinnefronten and WDI signed a letter of support for Reem Alsalem with other gender-critical and anti-trans groups. In 2025 Alsalem visited both Kvinnefronten and WDI Norway in Oslo, which was described as a local expression of the anti-gender movement in Oslo. Alsalem is described by scholars as a key anti-gender actor who has "consistently argued for further barriers and restrictions on legal gender recognition that undercut the rights of transgender individuals," and as part of an increasingly aggressive anti-queer and transphobic movement. In its current program the Women's Front opposes what it calls the "queer patriarchy", a term described by the gender-critical publication Gender Dissent as having been coined by WDI's Christina Ellingsen.

After Conservative Party local politician Simen Sandelien published a Facebook post about "transgender ideology", he was strongly criticized by the party. Conservative Party leader Erna Solberg said Sandelien should reconsider if he really agrees with the Conservative Party's basic ideology. Conservative Secretary general Tom Erlend Skaug said he had summoned Sandelien for a conversation, but amid calls for his expulsion Sandelien later that day sent out a statement confirming that he had resigned from the party.

=== Media ===
Media play a role in promoting transphobia and anti-gender narratives in Norway. Gender studies scholar Janne Bromseth noted that "the radical left-wing newspaper Klassekampen has had regular columnists expressing transphobic views for a long time."

The far-left and pro-Russian conspiracy theorist website Steigan.no promotes transphobia, as well as antisemitism and Russian propaganda. The secretary-general of the left-wing Red party Benedikte Pryneid Hansen said the party views Steigan as a platform of "onesided Russian war propaganda, conspiracy theories, racism and transphobia." The far-right anti-Muslim website Document.no also promotes transphobia, often by promoting trans-exclusionary radical feminists and their narratives. For example, it published an hour-long interview with WDI's Tonje Gjevjon and Christina Ellingsen, hosted by Erling Marthinsen. Marthinsen had previously been fired from far-right website Resett.no after expressing support for Anders Behring Breivik.

=== Opposition to transphobia ===
Norway officially observes and supports the International Day Against Homophobia, Biphobia and Transphobia. In 2023, 2611 feminists, including Norway's minister of equality, called for a reckoning with transphobia, stating that "for a long time, trans women who speak out publicly have been subjected to harassment and abuse, often by those who misuse lesbian identity and feminism to justify their transphobia." The leader of the Workers' Youth League, Astrid Hoem, emphasized that the left must take responsibility and confront transphobia within their ranks, while Alberte Bekkhus, the leader of the Red Youth, said "if the women's movement allows transphobes in disguise as feminists, at the expense of trans women, it is working against its own cause." Feminists Anna-Sabina Soggiu and Susanne Demou criticized the radical feminist organizations for fostering "fabricated issues and threat scenarios" about transgender people. The Norwegian Humanist Association has highlighted the "alarming unifying force of the increasing hatred and radicalization directed at transgender people" and promoted by self-identified radical feminists, conspiracy theorists, culture warriors, authoritarian men, Christian reactionaries, as well as the far right and far left. The Socialist Left Party's program states that "the feminist struggle is based on solidarity and includes everyone. Homophobia and transphobia are threats to feminist liberation.

== See also ==
- Anti-gender movement
- Bathroom bill
- Feminist views on transgender topics
- Homophobia
- LGBT grooming conspiracy theory
- LGBT rights in Norway
- Trans bashing
- Transgender people and military service
- Transgender people in sports
- Transphobia
- Transphobia in the United Kingdom
- Transphobia in the United States
