= Kamala is for they/them =

American political advertisement

Frame from the ad

"Kamala is for they/them, President Trump is for you" was a series of political advertisements commissioned by then-Republican Party nominee Donald Trump's campaign to attack Kamala Harris during the 2024 United States presidential election. The ads feature excerpts from an interview that Harris gave to National Center for Transgender Equality Action Fund's Mara Keisling, where Harris supported tax-funded gender-affirming surgery for prisoners. Each ad's kicker was "Kamala is for they/them, President Trump is for you."

The ads had several different variations, with the most notable featuring convicted first-degree murderer Shiloh Quine – the first inmate to receive taxpayer-funded gender reassignment surgery under a program run by California in 2017, while Harris was the state's attorney general.

The Trump campaign put the ads in heavy rotation, airing more than 30,000 times in every swing state, and during televised NFL and college football games and NASCAR Xfinity Series races. According to an analysis by Future Forward, the Kamala Harris campaign's main Super PAC, "Kamala is for they/them" was one of Trump's most effective 30-second attack ads, shifting the race 2.7 percentage points in favor of Trump after viewers watched it. Conversely, an RCT study by Ground Media released by GLAAD, an LGBTQ media monitoring organization, stated that the ad did not have a statistically significant impact on who viewers intended to vote for.

== Background ==
During Harris's 2020 Democratic Party presidential primary run, Harris expressed the importance of trans rights. Harris discussed her history with trans rights with Keisling, stating, "I can't remember a time where they have not been important to me. When I was district attorney of San Francisco, I started ... assistance program for members of the trans community." The murder of Gwen Araujo led to Harris organizing a training session to help prosecutors defeat the trans panic or gay panic defense.

The impetus for Harris's support for tax-funded transitions stems from the 2015 settlement between the California Department of Corrections and Rehabilitation and Shiloh Quine. Harris stated: "I worked behind the scenes to (...) make sure that transgender woman got the services she was deserving..." Quine had been behind bars since 1981, convicted of first-degree murder, kidnapping and robbery for ransom for the kidnap and murder of 33-year-old Shahid Ali Baig.

Harris pushed for further change within the California prison system, noting that she "...made sure they changed the policy in the state of California, so every transgender inmate in the prison system would have access to the medical care that they desired and needed..." Harris stated she felt strongly about the issue, saying, "... it's a civil rights issue, it's a justice issue, and it's an issue of humanity."

Trump had previously voiced his opposition to transgender women competing in women's sports and gender-affirming services for minors. His conservative allies stated that the issues can sway undecided voters, saying "Democrats had grown increasingly uneasy defending their support of pro-transgender policies around athletics and children." Conversely, Democrats largely avoided discussing transgender issues during the election campaign period.

According to a CBS News report, the Trump campaign paid $19 million to air the ad nearly 55,000 times between October 1 and 16, 2024. The ads, which had several different variations, aired more than 30,000 times in every swing state. The Trump campaign put the ads in heavy rotation during televised NFL and college football games.

== Reception and analysis ==
According to an analysis by the Democratic super PAC Future Forward, "Kamala is for they/them" was one of Trump's most effective 30-second campaign ads, shifting the race 2.7 percentage points in favor of Trump after viewers watched it. According to polling by the Trump campaign, the commercial resonated with suburban women. This demographic had been a key factor in Joe Biden's 2020 victory over Trump.

A different study, done by Ground Media and released by GLAAD, showed the ad failed to change viewers' voting preferences. However, the study also showed that public acceptance of trans people decreased by around 3-4 percentage points among those who watched the ad. In the aftermath of the election, Keisling told Semafor that the ads had negative ramifications for transgender people, especially for trans children and their families.

Democrats did not formally respond to the ads containing the slogan during the campaign period. Former President Bill Clinton privately expressed concern about the ad and encouraged the Harris campaign to respond to it saying, "We have to answer it and say we won't do it." The Harris campaign had originally planned to release an ad responding, but the ad ended up performing poorly in internal tests and was ultimately never run.

In early October, podcast host Charlamagne tha God commended the ad for its effectiveness during a segment of The Breakfast Club, saying, "Hell no, I don't want my taxpayer dollars going to that." The Trump campaign then clipped his remarks and added them to another round of ads against his consent. Charlamagne issued a cease and desist order, demanding Trump cut him out of his campaign ad.

Former New Jersey Governor Chris Christie also praised the commercial. "The most effective ad that the Trump campaign ran in this campaign was, you know, 'Kamala Harris is for they/them, and Donald Trump is for us.' That's because most people don't see themselves as they/them. Yet, the Democrats have spent more time talking about a trans issue, which, quite frankly, is infinitesimal."

Minnesota Governor and Harris's running mate, Tim Walz, responded: "They're running millions of dollars of ads demonizing folks who are just trying to live their lives."

Sarah McBride, who is the first openly transgender member of Congress and was elected to the House of Representatives in 2024, said of the ads: "It wasn't the surgery point, it wasn't the undocumented-immigrant point, it wasn't the trans point, it was the concept in that line that Kamala Harris, according to the ad, was for a small group of people, and Donald Trump was there for 'you'."

In the first episode of his podcast, This Is Gavin Newsom, Democratic California governor Gavin Newsom agreed with his first guest, conservative activist Charlie Kirk, that "Kamala is for they/them" was the most politically harmful attack ad against Harris. "She didn't even react to it, which was even more devastating," Newsom said. He added that "it was a great ad."

== See also ==
- Daisy (advertisement)
- Adult human female
- Mass media and American politics
- Persecution of transgender people under the second Trump administration
- Willie Horton
