= Gay Nazis =

Gay Nazis may refer to:

- Gay Nazis myth, the myth that there were numerous and prominent homosexual Nazis
- Men, Heroes and Gay Nazis, a 2005 German documentary film about gay neo-Nazis
- National Socialist League (United States), an American neo-Nazi gay organization
- Racism in the LGBTQ community § Gay Neo-Nazism

== See also ==
- Category:LGBTQ people in the Nazi Party
- LGBTQ people in Nazi Germany (disambiguation)
- Persecution of homosexuals in Nazi Germany
