= Kari Jaquesson =

Norwegian conspiracy theorist and Holocaust denier

Kari Angelique Jaquesson
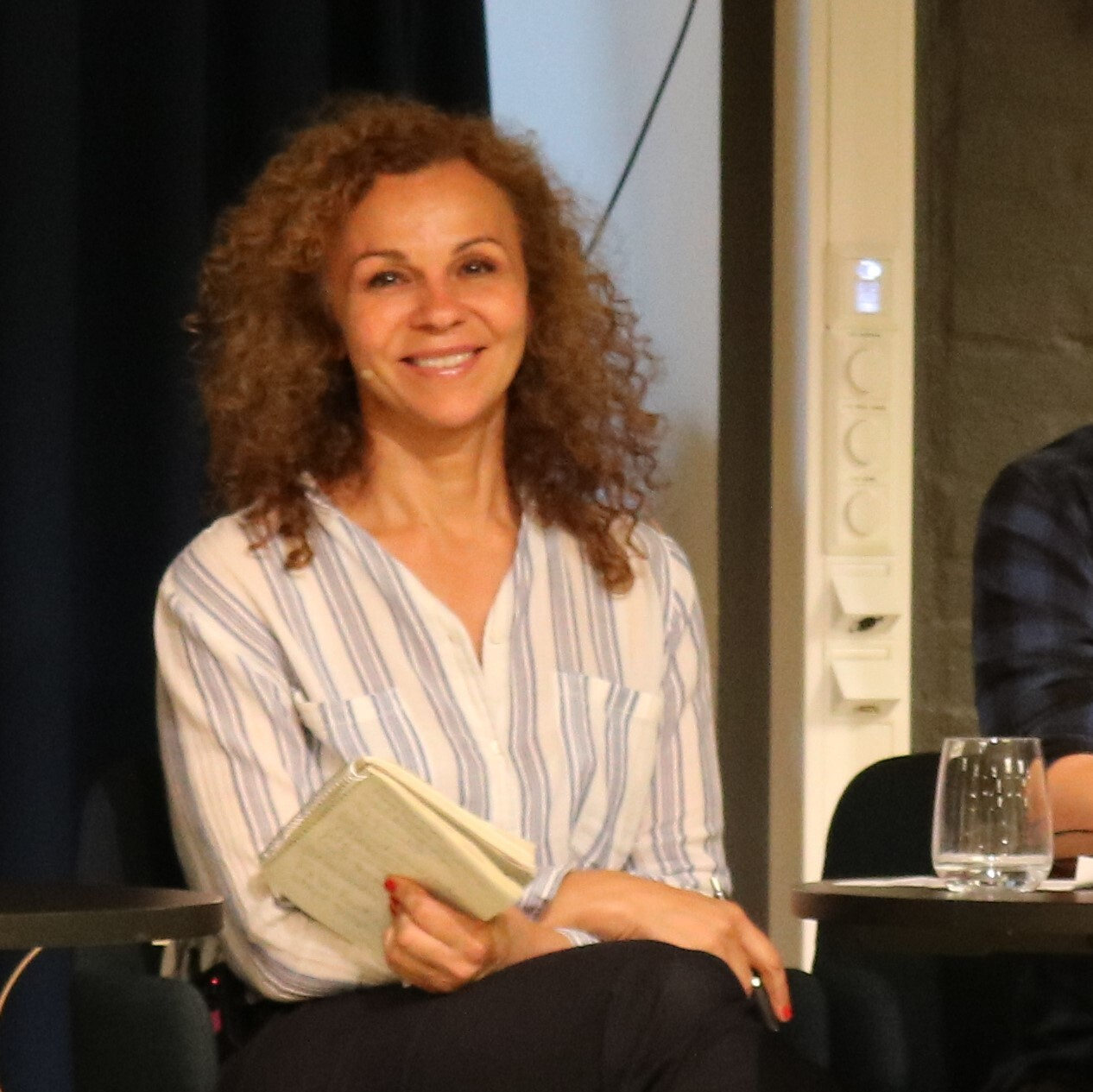
- Born: Kari Angelique Jaquesson; 12 April 1962 (age 64)

Kari Angelique Jaquesson (born 12 April 1962) is a Norwegian conspiracy theorist, Holocaust denier, author, fitness consultant and former television personality. She writes for the conspiracy theorist website Steigan.no and promotes Holocaust denial, Antisemitism, transphobia, climate change denial, COVID-19 misinformation, and Russian propaganda, and supports the Russian invasion of Ukraine. She has supported far-right and neo-Nazi groups including The Alliance and the Nordic Resistance Movement, and has claimed that "there was no one who tried to exterminate the Jews in Europe." She has been active in the radical feminist group Women's Group Ottar for several years. The Norwegian Centre Against Racism noted that "in recent years [Jaquesson] has increasingly made a name for herself as a supporter of various conspiracy theories. A 2021 survey by YouGov found that the public figures viewed most negatively by Norwegians were Donald Trump, Kari Jaquesson and Vladimir Putin.

== Fitness and television career ==
Kari Jaquesson is an aerobics instructor and became widely known in Norway in the 1990s for hosting a daytime workout program on TV2. She has also written books about fitness. She was named a Goodwill Ambassador for the United Nations Population Fund in 2000 to raise awareness about fitness and public health.

== Views ==
From the 2010s Jaquesson has become known for promoting a number of conspiracy theories, including climate change denial, COVID-19 misinformation and Russian propaganda related to the Russian invasion of Ukraine.

=== Holocaust denial, Jews and Israel ===
Jaquesson has promoted Holocaust denial for years, and has claimed that "there was no one who tried to exterminate the Jews in Europe. If they did, they did a lousy job, since the Jewish population had not shrunk after the war."

In 2015 Jaquesson implied that Israel supported ISIS, and was criticized by the Norwegian Humanist Association and others, who accused her of promoting antisemitic conspiracy theories.

=== Syria ===
Jaquesson is a long-time supporter of Bashar al-Assad. John Færseth argued that Jaquesson painted a picture of "a grand, international conspiracy against a popular Assad regime."

=== Views on transgender people ===
Jaquesson has said that "a man cannot become a woman." She is active in the Women's Declaration International anti-transgender group. She has also been active in the radical feminist Feminist Group Ottar and has often caused controversy as a representative of that group; in 2016, she told a 17-year girl to "suck dick ten times a day". The controversy regarded the legalization of prostitution, and the sucking was proposed to picture the unpleasant daily life of a prostitute.

=== COVID-19 misinformation ===
From 2020 Jaquesson has actively promoted COVID-19 misinformation. She claimed there was no pandemic and ridiculed the public health measures, such as the use of masks.

=== Russia ===
Jaquesson supports the Russian invasion of Ukraine. She is a contributor to and a co-owner of the website Steigan.no that promotes Russian propaganda.

== Bibliography ==
- Det gode liv, LibriArte, 1999
- Hurra, jeg er gravid: trim og kosthold for nybakte mødre, Cappelen, 2000
- 10 minutter til en sprekere kropp, 2004
- 10 minutter til en sterkere rygg og litt flatere mage, 2007
- 10 minutter til fastere lår og en litt mer spretten rumpe, 2008
- Ketsjup er ålreit, 2009
- Kropp på topp! : på 10 minutter : lår og rumpe, armer og overkropp, rygg og mage, 2010
- Det første steget til en sprekere kropp, 2012
- Sunnere hverdagsmat, 2012
