= Women's Declaration International =

Anti-trans advocacy group

- Abbreviation: WDI
- Formation: 2019
- Founder: Maureen O'Hara; Sheila Jeffreys; Heather Brunksell Evans
- Type: NGO
- Headquarters: United Kingdom
- Region served: International
- Website: womensdeclaration.com
- Formerly called: Women's Human Rights Campaign (WHRC)

The Women's Declaration International (WDI), formerly the Women's Human Rights Campaign (WHRC), is a British gender-critical and anti-trans advocacy group with branches in other countries. WDI has published a Declaration on Women's Sex-Based Rights, and has developed model legislation to restrict transgender rights that has been used in state legislatures in the United States.

== History and structure ==
The Women's Human Rights Campaign (WHRC) was founded by Sheila Jeffreys and Heather Brunskell-Evans. In February 2018, Brunskell-Evans had been removed from her role as Women's Equality Party spokesperson and resigned from the party after the party opened an investigation into comments she made to the BBC about the parents of transgender children. In March 2018, Jeffreys attended a "Transgenderism and the War on Women" event at the Parliament of the United Kingdom sponsored by Conservative MP David Davies, and during her presentation, said: "when men claim to be women ... and parasitically occupy the bodies of the oppressed, they speak for the oppressed. They become to be recognised as the oppressed. There's no space for women's liberation".

Mauro Cabral Grinspan, Ilana Eloit, David Paternotte and Mieke Verloo described WDI as "one of the key players of anti-trans feminism at a global scale".

=== Declaration on Women's Sex-Based Rights ===
In March 2019, the WHRC launched the Declaration on Women's Sex-Based Rights in New York, co-authored by Maureen O'Hara, Jeffreys and Brunskell-Evans. In 2019, the group appeared to "primarily exist as the organisation behind the declaration", according to Pink News.

In advance of a planned event at the Scottish Parliament hosted by MSP Jenny Marra and MSP Joan McAlpine in November 2019, the group described the declaration as intended to be "a statement on the importance of keeping the current sex based definition of woman". The document refers to trans women as "men who claim a female gender identity". The Association for Women's Rights in Development has said the declaration co-opts the "Convention on the Elimination of All Forms of Discrimination Against Women (CEDAW) framework to claim that 'sex' is an immutable category and 'gender' is not a legitimate concept", and the "'sex-based' rhetoric misuses concepts of sex and gender to push a deeply discriminatory agenda". Legal scholar and human rights expert Sandra Duffy described the declaration's concept of "sex-based rights" as "a fiction with the pretense of legality".

The advocacy groups LGB Alliance and Women's Liberation Front (WoLF) signed the declaration in 2019, while the Equality Network and the Scottish Trans Alliance criticised it. Emma Ritch, executive director of the feminist policy organisation Engender said that "this so-called ‘declaration on women’s sex-based rights’ [...] doesn’t include women’s rights to housing, pay equality, access to justice, social security, education, or political representation. When it talks about violence against women, freedom of expression, and children's rights it does so entirely through the warped lens of antipathy towards trans people" and that "trans rights and women's rights are consistent with one another, and we call on Holyrood to continue to shape legislation and scrutinise policy in order to uphold the rights of all women, including trans women, in Scotland". Scottish Women's Aid said "We are immensely saddened that the Scottish Parliament, an institution we value and care so much about, would be used by those seeking to stigmatise and discriminate against trans women".

The group says it is "female-only" and the Declaration on Women's Sex-Based Rights was created to "lobby nations to maintain language protecting women and girls on the basis of sex rather than gender or gender identity". In December 2021, the group changed its name to Women's Declaration International.

=== Supporting organizations ===
The "supporting organizations" that have signed WDI's manifesto include Women's Liberation Front, The LGB Alliance, Deep Green Resistance, European Network of Migrant Women, Lesbian Rights Alliance, Womad, and Let Women Speak, and websites Spinster and Ovarit.

== Views and advocacy ==
In 2021, the group called for the repeal of the Gender Recognition Act in a submission to the Women and Equalities Select Committee for an inquiry chaired by Tory MP Caroline Nokes.

For International Women's Day in 2021, WHRC Norway (now WDI Norway) proposed the slogans "No to heresy in primary schools, girls and women do not have a penis" and "Only women are women," that were accused of being hateful and transphobic by major feminist organisations of the country. Christine Marie Jentoft, an advisor on gender diversity at the Norwegian Organisation for Sexual and Gender Diversity, described WHRC as a hate group that works to deprive transgender people of autonomy and rights. Gender studies professor Elisabeth L. Engebretsen described the group's Norwegian branch as anti-gender and part of a "complex threat to democracy" that "represent[s] a reactionary populist backlash to basic human rights principles," and that seeks to "demonize the very basics of trans existence".

Kathleen Stock, who resigned from her position at the University of Sussex in 2021 following accusations of transphobia, had been criticised by student protesters for signing WHRC's declaration. WHRC subsequently released a joint statement together with the Women's Liberation Front (WoLF) in support of Stock.

In June 2022 several groups opposing trans rights, including WDI USA, Alliance Defending Freedom, Family Research Council and Women's Liberation Front, organized a rally called "Our Bodies, Our Sports" in Washington D.C. The American Independent noted that some of the organizers, but not WDI, are designated as hate groups by the Southern Poverty Law Center, and Lindsay Schubiner, an expert on extremism, said: "There has been a clear increase in organizing to promote anti-LGBTQ and specifically anti-trans bigotry and I think that we can see that trend line moving up. This event in particular looks like an attempt to legitimize and elevate and spread their transphobia and especially to build political power around specific anti-trans policy goals". The article also noted that WDI had tweeted in support of abortion rights.

In September 2023, WDI USA organized their annual convention in San Francisco, drawing protests from local feminists and LGBTQ rights activists.

In its 2023 report titled Combating Anti-LGBTQ+ Pseudoscience, Southern Poverty Law Center (SPLC) described WDI as part of "the contemporary anti-LGBTQ+ pseudoscience network" and said WDI's "Declaration on Women's Sex-Based Rights" promotes "anti-trans ideology" and has "become a model for anti-trans legislation." SPLC further said WDI engages in narrative manipulation. The largest U.S. feminist organisation, the National Organization for Women (NOW), described WDI and WoLF as "anti-trans bigots disguised as feminists" and said WDI has a focus on "sex fundamentalism and hostility towards trans people".

The Association for Women's Rights in Development (AWID) has described WHRC as a trojan horse in human rights spaces and argued that WHRC "engages in sensationalism and fear-mongering" to "undermine and water down the progressions of human rights standards that protect the rights of trans and gender non-conforming persons," and that WDI promotes "extreme anti-trans misinformation". AWID and the Trans Safety Network have both described WHRC/WDI as "an extreme anti-trans group". Equity Forward discussed WHRC in the context of the Trump administration's "anti-human rights multilateralism" and described it as anti-trans. The Canadian Anti-Hate Network described WHRC as a "TERF project".

Fascism scholar Simon Strick writes that WDI’s "extremist" positions have "isolated the WDI from wider international feminism and brought them into strategic coalitions with conservative and extreme right organizations". According to Vice the group has promoted conspiracy theories and false information. An article in the journal Forskningspolitikk (Research Policy) noted that "WDI portrays itself as a women's rights organization, but spends almost all of its time persecuting trans women," including by "trolling trans people in social media".

A 2023 report by Transgender Europe described WDI as one of the main anti-gender actors targeting trans people in Germany, and stated that WDI's tactics include fostering open hostility towards individual trans people, encouraging conspiracy thinking, building connections with the far right and promoting "shitstorms" against selected targets. An article in Der Freitag argued that WDI openly promotes far-right views when it furthers the TERF cause.

In Norway, WDI's leader and deputy leader Christina Eline Ellingsen and Tonje Gjevjon have appeared on the Youtube channel of the far-right anti-immigrant website Document.no. Cathrine Linn Kristiansen, the chair of the main Norwegian radical feminist group, the Women's Front (Kvinnefronten), described WDI, on behalf of herself and her group, as "transphobes, racists and sexists" and said that "we strongly condemn them". WDI Norway's first deputy leader Anne Kalvig said both the country's government-appointed Extremism Commission and the Norwegian Humanist Association had portrayed WDI as far-right and extremist.

In 2022, WDI USA president Kara Dansky, who has served as a WoLF board member and co-chair, issued a statement of support on behalf of WDI USA for the Women's Bill of Rights developed by the Republican Study Committee group of Republican Party members in the United States House of Representatives, stating it "would enshrine into law many of the principles outlined in the global Declaration on Women's Sex-Based Rights, which we work to advance throughout U.S. law".

By 2023, model legislation to restrict rights for transgender people had been distributed by Women's Declaration International USA to state legislatures in the United States. Proposed legislation with language similar to the WDI model legislation was introduced in some state legislatures that seek to develop laws to restrict access to gender-affirming care for youth under age 18.

In August 2024 WDI along with several other gender-critical groups including Women's Liberation Front and European Network of Migrant Women launched an open letter condemning UN Women for "demonizing and vilifying women who know that men are not women, and never will be," in response to a UN Women statement that anti-gender and gender-critical movements are anti-rights movements that employ hate propaganda and disinformation.

WDI has voiced support for the persecution of transgender people under the second Trump administration. WDI president Kara Dansky wrote that Trump's actions against transgender people are "rational policy," and that "I have to imagine that American TERFs have played a role in informing (May Mailman's) thinking" in drafting Executive Order 14168 titled "Defending Women from Gender Ideology Extremism and Restoring Biological Truth to the Federal Government."

== Reception ==
The organisation has been described as gender-critical, anti-trans, anti-LGBTQ, anti-gender, trans-exclusionary, trans-exclusionary radical feminist (TERF), and as a hate group. WDI has voiced support for the Trump administration's transgender policy and WDI president Kara Dansky wrote that Executive Order 14168 is "rational policy". The Southern Poverty Law Center considers WDI part of an "anti-LGBTQ+ pseudoscience network". The largest U.S. feminist organisation, the National Organization for Women, described WDI as "anti-trans bigots disguised as feminists."

== See also ==
- FiLiA
