= Emma Ritch =

British feminist activist, campaigner, and author (1976–2021)

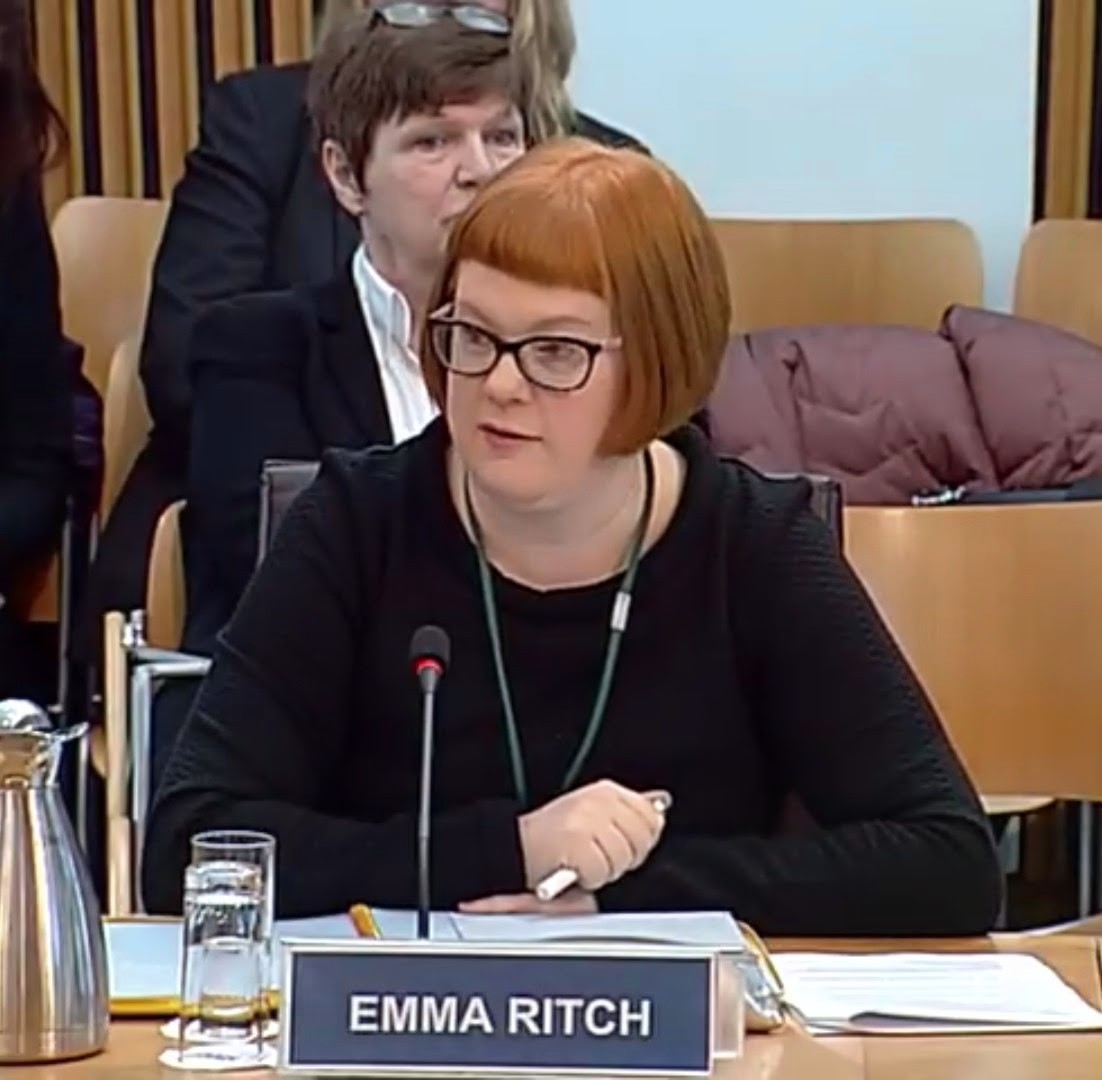
Emma Ritch, 2017

Emma Ritch (8 December 1976 – 9 July 2021) was a Scottish women's rights campaigner who was the executive director of Engender, a feminist policy organisation working on women’s social, economic, and political equality in Scotland. She had been working there for 13 years when she died on 9 July 2021.

== Career ==
Ritch was a graduate of English Language and Literature at Glasgow University and an activist, campaigner and author. She had a masters degree in IT and management.

She worked as an advisor to the Scottish Government on equality issues. She was a member of the Scottish Government's First Minister's Advisory Council on Women & Girls. She was on the joint strategic board of Equally Safe, and the advisory group of the Scottish Women’s Rights Centre. Ritch became Chair of Rape Crisis Scotland board in 2016 and Chair of the Board of Trustees of the board of the Human Rights Consortium Scotland in 2020. She sat on the equality advisory groups of Skills Development Scotland, was a member of the YWCA Glasgow board for eight years, and served a four-year term on the GMB union's National Equality Forum. She was a board member of the European Women's Lobby. As a women's rights campaigner Ritch advocated an inclusive feminism and was known for her intersectional approach and support for LGBT rights. She stated that "trans rights and women's rights are consistent with one another, and we call on Holyrood to continue to shape legislation and scrutinise policy in order to uphold the rights of all women, including trans women, in Scotland." She had a particular interest in the relation between equality policies and human rights; under her leadership Engender became "the authoritative voice on women’s unpaid care work, the devastating effect of austerity and the need for a social security system that meets the needs of women’s lives, hate crime, equal representation in politics, and access to safe, legal abortion healthcare."

== Death and legacy ==
On her death, Ritch's career and voluntary work was described as 'dedicated to realising women's equality and rights' and Engender considered her 'hugely influential in the movement in Scotland'. The First Minister of Scotland, Nicola Sturgeon called her 'a force for good - a passionate advocate for women's rights and a champion of justice and equality.' The Icelandic women's rights association Kvenrettindafelags Islands said she was a 'kind, brilliant and fiercely feminist voice for change in Europe.'

In December 2021, the Scottish Government published its "Response to the First Minister's National Advisory Council on Women and Girls (NACWG) 2020 Repert" and it the foreword Nicola Sturgeon again remembers Ritch as a "passionate advocate for equality".

In March 2023, the University of Glasgow opened a law clinic to conduct research and to help people who were victims of a sexual assault. It was named the Emma Ritch Law Clinic after Ritch who was a Glasgow University alumna.
