= Simon Strick =

- Born: 1974 (age 51–52)
- Education: Humboldt University of Berlin
- Scientific career
- Fields: Gender studies, cultural studies, studies of fascism
- Workplaces: University of Hamburg, Brandenburg Center for Media Studies

Simon Strick (born 1974) is a German cultural and gender studies scholar known for his research on right-wing extremism, neo-fascism, and alt-right Internet communities.

Strick earned a PhD in cultural studies at the Humboldt University of Berlin in 2011. His dissertation was later published as the book American Dolorologies (2014). His research has focused on cultural studies, gender studies, criminology and studies of fascism, and he has worked as a dramaturg. He has been a professor of criminology at the University of Hamburg and is affiliated with the Brandenburg Center for Media Studies.

His book Rechte Gefühle: Affekte und Strategien des digitalen Faschismus on identity and affect politics of right-wing extremism explores what he coins "digital fascism" of far-right echo chambers on the Internet, including communities based around social media, blogs and memes. He received the Hans Bausch Prize for the book. Strick describes this new fascism as a movement of culture warriors. According to Strick, racism is a core component of this new fascism.

== Selected works ==
- American Dolorologies: Pain, Sentimentalism, Biopolitics, State University of New York Press, Albany 2014, ISBN 978-1-4384-5021-6.
- Rechte Gefühle: Affekte und Strategien des digitalen Faschismus, Transcript Verlag, Bielefeld 2021, ISBN 978-3-8376-5495-0.
