= Adult human female =

Slogan used by anti-trans activists

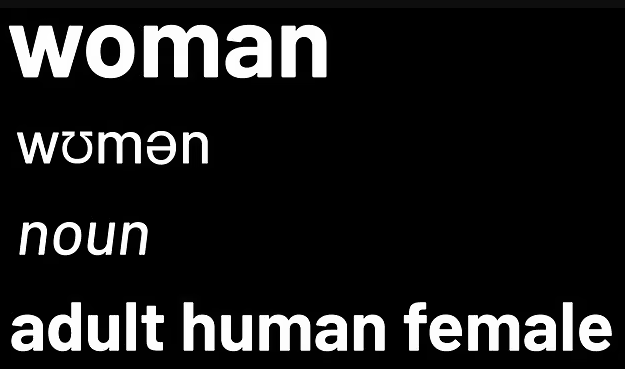
Material produced by Let Women Speak, founded by anti-trans activist Kellie-Jay Keen-Minshull, seeking to popularize a strict meaning of the word woman

"Adult human female" is a slogan adopted by anti-gender and gender-critical feminist movements, with the aim of excluding trans women from the definition of a woman. The phrase is a dictionary-type definition of woman, and some scholars have described it as a dog whistle for transphobic beliefs. The phrase is often accompanied by other anti-trans rhetoric, sometimes as an answer to the rhetorical question "What is a woman?". The phrase has been utilized by the second Trump administration in its persecution of transgender people.

== Use by anti-trans movements ==
"Adult female human" is sometimes given as the answer to the rhetorical question "what is a woman?", another popular rhetorical strategy in anti-trans discourse. The phrase is described by scholars as a dog whistle for transphobic beliefs, and part of organised transphobic discourse.

British anti-trans activist Kellie-Jay Keen-Minshull is credited with coining the phrase. In 2018, Keen-Minshull purchased billboards in Liverpool which read "woman / wʊmən / noun / adult human female"; Keen-Minshull said they were in response to the mayor of Liverpool's support for trans rights. The poster was removed after "an LGBT activist complained Ms Keen-Minshull's campaign represented a 'hate group'", with the ad company that installed the billboards saying they had been "misled" by the campaign and that they were "fully committed to equality for all". On 19 September, the Liverpool city council unanimously passed a motion declaring that "trans women are women" and that "there is no place in our city for hatred and bigotry".

Criminology researchers Brightman, Lenning & DeJong identify the term as a common catchphrase in anti-trans discourse, alongside "gender ideology" and "groomer". Sociologists Amery & Mondon argue that the phrase frames anti-trans movements as guarding scientific "truths" (e.g. that sex is immutable) against an emotional "trans ideology", which they compare to the red pill metaphor used by the alt-right and manosphere. Researchers in natural language processing and computational social science investigating dog whistles and hate speech in computational models found that dog whistle terms such as "adult human female" are often employed to evade automated hate speech detection models. Researchers from the University of East Anglia investigating the distinction of the ordinary and legal framework of hate speech contrasted explicit or overt hate speech in identity denials against terms such as "adult human female" as an example of "implicit, covert, sneaky, implied, sanitized, coded, or dog whistle hate speech."

A handout on identifying common hate speech examples by the New Zealand Police called out an incident of an individual reporting pro-trans chalk writings as "graffiti" in a public space. After police attended to the report and took no further question, the individual then posted about it online and then proceeded to replace the writings with "woman = adult human female", which was flagged by the police as perceived hate.

In 2020, Merriam-Webster expanded its definitions of female and girl with trans-inclusive senses ("having a gender identity that is the opposite of male"; "a person whose gender identity is female"). In October 2022, the Cambridge Dictionary added supplemental definitions of man and woman: "an adult who lives and identifies as [male/female] though they may have been said to have a different sex at birth".

=== Documentary ===
In 2023, a screening of the film Adult Human Female, which asserts that women are defined solely by biological sex, was cancelled at Edinburgh University after the film had faced repeated protests. The screening was rescheduled following initial protests and on the second date, Protesters blocked entrance to the film to "challenge hate speech" and vowed to show up "every single time" that the event was rescheduled. Protesters called the film transphobic and said it "has no academic merit” to be shown on campus. The film was eventually screened on campus in November 2023 and attracted more than 100 protestors.

Two academics involved in the making of the film later sued the University and College Union alleging that its attempts to block screening constituted discrimination and harassment. A tribunal ultimately rejected the claim.

=== Use by second Trump administration ===
After campaigning for president on a platform targeting transgender people, Donald Trump signed Executive Order 14168 on 20 January 2025, the first day of his second term as president. The order rolled back federal recognition of transgender people, ended gender self-identification on identity documents such as passports and visas and declared that women and girls refer to "adult and juvenile human females, respectively". The Trump transition team presented the planned executive order as part of a wider agenda of "restoring sanity".

== See also ==
- Anti-transgender movement in the United Kingdom
- 2020s anti-LGBTQ movement in the United States
- Kamala is for they/them
- What Is a Woman?
