= LGBTQ people in Nazi Germany =

LGBTQ people in Nazi Germany may refer to:

- Lesbians in Nazi Germany
- Persecution of homosexual men in Nazi Germany
- Persecution of transgender people in Nazi Germany

== See also ==
- Category:LGBTQ in Nazi Germany
- Gay Nazis (disambiguation)
