= Women's Front =

Norwegian feminist organization

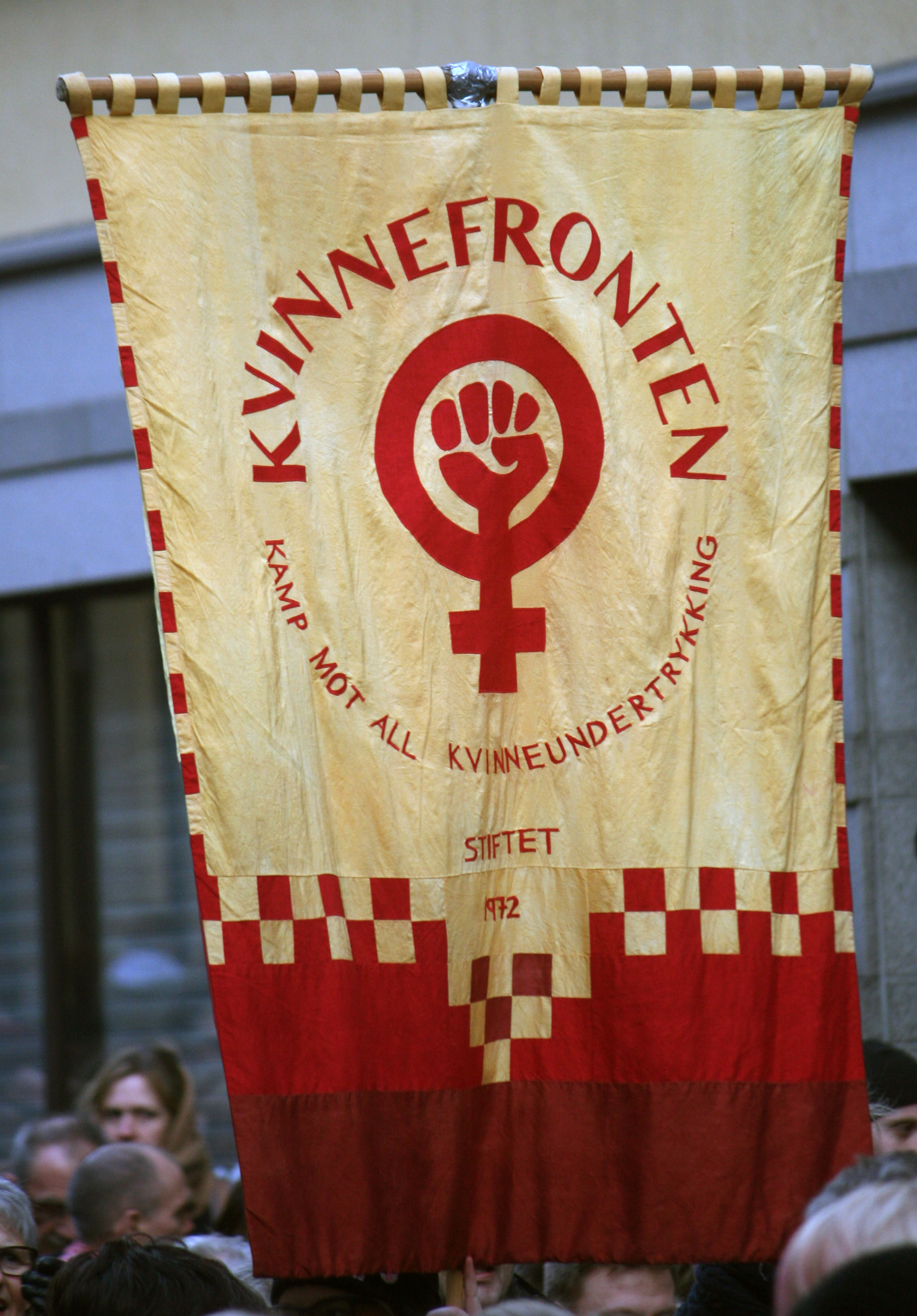
The Kvinnefronten banner

The Women's Front (Norwegian: Kvinnefronten) is a Norwegian radical feminist organization that has in the 2020s increasingly promoted gender-critical and anti-gender views. Describing itself as the country's oldest and largest radical feminist group, (Note: It is accurate that Kvinnefronten is the oldest group existing today that now considers itself radical feminist, but Kvinnefronten did not consider itself feminist at all in the 1970s, when it was a harsh critic of feminism. There were other groups formed in the 1970s that did consider themselves feminist) it was founded in 1972 and was historically associated with the now defunct Maoist Workers' Communist Party (AKP). Its central focus from the 1970s was fighting what it called "monopoly capitalism" and "imperialism". It claimed that "we have one common enemy: imperialism" and considered "the state, business and capital" to be the main forces which oppressed women. Kvinnefronten considered themselves part of the "proletarian women's movement" and viewed feminism as an opposing, bourgeois ideology. Kvinnefronten was under surveillance by the Norwegian Police Security Service from 1975, as the authorities regarded the organization as a threat to national security. A 1984 report by the Police Security Service described Kvinnefronten as extremist and as a front organization for the Workers' Communist Party. Among other women's organizations in the 1970s Kvinnefronten was sometimes referred to as "Pål's hens" (Pål sine høner) due to its fealty to Pål Steigan, the AKP chairman.

In the 1970s, the Women’s Front was hostile toward lesbians, as a result of AKP's view that homosexuality was decadent and bourgeois. Since at least 2015 it has faced criticism for its views on transgender people. However, its public views on transgender people have been somewhat ambivalent, and it has for example called anti-trans group Women's Declaration International (WDI) "transphobes, racists and sexists" and said that "we strongly condemn them". Former Kvinnefronten board member Anne Kalvig has publicly criticized the organization for its reluctance to campaign openly against transgender rights; dissatisfaction among some members who shared her views led to the establishment of an anti-trans splinter group, Kvinneaktivistene, which campaigns against what it calls "gender ideology." However, Kvinnefronten has since more openly embraced gender-critical and anti-gender views, notably through its support for Reem Alsalem, a supporter of Donald Trump's persecution of transgender people who is considered a key anti-gender and anti-trans voice, and after Alsalem called on states to "ensure that the terms 'women' and 'girls' are only used to describe biological females". In 2025 Kvinnefronten signed a letter of support for Alsalem with other gender-critical and anti-trans groups including WDI. Later that year both Kvinnefronten and WDI Norway invited Alsalem to Oslo to promote her views on transgender people, which was described as a local expression of the anti-gender movement in Oslo. In its current program the Women's Front opposes what it calls the "queer patriarchy", a term described by the gender-critical publication Gender Dissent as having been coined by WDI's Christina Ellingsen.

== History ==
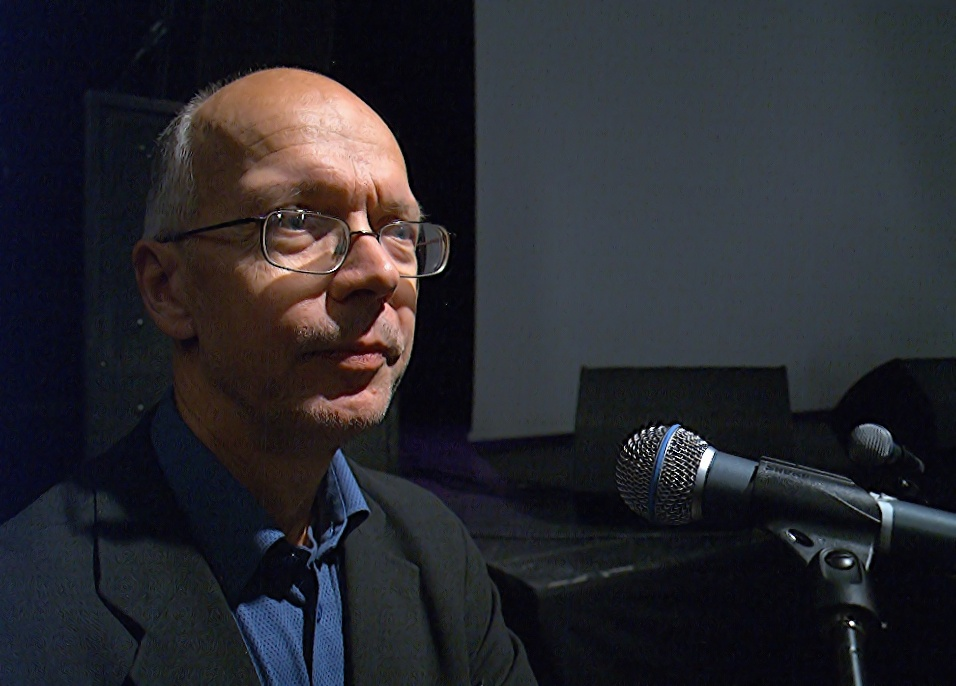
Among Norwegian feminists in the 1970s, the Women's Front was often called "Pål's hens" (Pål sine høner) due to its fealty to Pål Steigan, the AKP chairman. The Women's Front did not consider itself feminist.

The organization was founded in 1972 and grew out of the marxist-leninist movement, known as the "M-L movement." As Norway's first radical feminist group, it distanced itself from the existing women's movement in Norway. It took its name after the historical newspaper named Kvinnefronten ("the women's front") which had been published by the Communist Party of Norway. The organization also built on women's movements against Norway's membership of the European Economic Community. It was closely associated with the Workers' Communist Party. In the 1990s, it became known through the publication of the Lund Report that the organization had been under observation by the Norwegian Police Security Service, which categorized it as a front organization for the Workers' Communist Party, which the Police Security Service considered to be extremist.

During the first part of the 1970s, the organization was briefly the largest women's association in Norway with 3,500 members in 125 towns and cities in 1973, but after the mid 1970s, the organization lost most of its members and the membership declined to a few hundred members. From 1978, the organization became known for its pornography activism, which included showing hard pornographic films in public, intended to scare and upset the audience, which it called "porn against porn."

In 1991 several members left the Women's Front to found a new organization, called the Ottar Women's Group, following disagreements on various issues, especially the Women's Front's relaxation of its stance on pornography. The breakaway faction that formed Ottar Women's Group had been the most radical wing of the Women's Front, but found themselves in the minority at the 1991 annual meeting of the organization.

The Women's Front has published journals under three different names: Kvinnefront (1975–1981), Kvinnejournalen (1982–2004) and thereafter Fett.

== Views ==
According to the organization's original program, its goal was to "fight for women's liberation" by "fighting capitalism and imperialism." It considered "the state, business and capital" to be the main forces which oppressed women. In line with its roots in the anti-imperialist left of the early 1970s, the Women's Front has been critical of newer feminist movements which emerged in the 1980s and 1990s, such as queer feminism.

The organization today describes itself as "a radical feminist organization that opposes all forms of oppression of women, economic, sexual, political and cultural."

The Women's Front has also been active in promoting women's self-determination in abortion and pornography. It has liaised internationally with likeminded organizations in developing countries such as Afghanistan, Palestine and the Philippines and has participated in international networks on abortion, reproduction, trafficking and violence against women.

The Women's Front is traditionally regarded as Norway's main radical feminist organization.

== Views on transgender people ==
The organization's views on transgender people have historically been somewhat ambivalent. Since around 2015 it has increasingly been criticized by the LGBT+ community for its views on transgender people. Feminist studies scholars Janne Bromseth, Elisabeth Lund Engebretsen, Lin Prøitz, Katrina Roen and Stine H. Bang Svendsen noted in 2017 that "trans-exclusionary radical feminism" (TERF) rhetoric appears to be a strong current in Norway. However Kvinnefronten has previously also criticized transphobia. For example Cathrine Linn Kristiansen, the chair of Kvinnefronten, described anti-trans group Women's Declaration International (WDI), on behalf of herself and her group, as "transphobes, racists and sexists" and said that "we strongly condemn them". Kvinnefronten's journal Fett described its platform as intersectional feminist and co-signed a statement that expressed solidarity with trans people and criticized "statements that demonize and dehumanize trans people, dressed up as a debate about gender and health in the name of freedom of expression. We strongly believe that transgender people's right to exist as human beings is not a matter of debate". However, Fett has a degree of independence from Kvinnefronten itself.

In 2025 Kvinnefronten has invited and signed letters in support of Reem Alsalem, who is considered a key anti-gender actor, who has "consistently argued for further barriers and restrictions on legal gender recognition that undercut the rights of transgender individuals," and who is described by scholars as part of an increasingly aggressive anti-queer and transphobic movement. Alsalem has supported the Trump administration's policies on transgender people, appeared at Alliance Defending Freedom and The Heritage Foundation events, and called on states to "ensure that the terms 'women' and 'girls' are only used to describe biological females".

In 2025 Kvinnefronten signed a letter of support for Alsalem with other gender-critical and anti-trans groups including WDI. In 2025 Alsalem visited both Kvinnefronten and WDI Norway in Oslo, which was described as a local expression of the anti-gender movement in Oslo.
