= Engender =

- Formation: 1993
- Purpose: Feminist Advocacy
- Location: Edinburgh, Scotland
- Region served: Scotland
- Methods: Raising awareness, training activists, research, and advocacy
- Executive Director: Catherine Murphy
- Website: www.engender.org.uk

Engender is an anti-sexist organisation operating in Scotland and other parts of Europe. Their mission is "to dismantle structural sexism to increase women’s social, political and economic equality, and enable women's rights… to produce research, analysis, and recommendations for intersectional feminist legislation and programmes." Engender's goals include increased public awareness of sexism and its detrimental effects on society, equal representation of women in government, and training women activists at the local level.

== History ==
Engender was founded in the early 1990s as a research and campaigning organisation. It was formed after a conference was held in 1991 and was officially launched as a membership organization in 1993 by a group of women in Edinburgh , where the organization is still located today. These women formed Engender after looking at the women’s movement in Scotland and noticing a lack of research, information gathering, and information spreading for women’s lives at the time.

== Funding ==
Fundings for Engender are received from various organizations, but their main grant funder is the Scottish Government Equality Fund. In the April 2023 to May 2024 year, the Scottish Government made up 97.7% of Engender’s income, £556,800 out of £569,456, with the remaining income coming from donations and legacies, and consultancy.

== Activism ==
Engender's website includes different research and policy focuses. Currently, these focuses are Equal Media & Culture Centre, Care, Education and Training, The Labour Market, Health, Abortion and Reproductive Healthcare, Women’s Representation, Public Space, Social Security, Violence against Women, Primary Prevention of Violence Against Women, Women’s Rights, and Our Economy. It is the sister organization to the Scottish Women's Budget Group, Scottish Women's Convention, and Women's Fund for Scotland, along with maintaining the Women in Scotland database alongside Glasgow Women's Library. It also stayed a part of the European Women's Lobby after Brexit.

Engender currently opposes the most recent UK Court judgment on the Equality Act 2010 for taking a “regressive view of the protections provided by the Equality Act” due to concerns “about what this means for trans people’s rights.” This is because in For Women Scotland Ltd v The Scottish Ministers [2025] UKSC 16, it was ruled that the Equality Act’s usage of man and woman was in reference to biological sex, not gender identity. Engender’s stance is controversial, as gender-critical feminists criticise it including trans women under its purview.

Engender opposes the current system for getting an abortion in Scotland, as it currently requires two doctors to approve and give access to the procedure. This results in inconsistent service for women wanting an abortion, and leaves abortion “within the criminal justice system in Scotland.”
