= Persecution of transgender people under the second Trump administration =

During the second presidency of Donald Trump, the United States government has taken a series of actions to persecute people who are transgender. These actions have been accompanied by anti-transgender rhetoric and misinformation, often to dehumanize and scapegoat transgender people and portray them as a social threat.

The administration has restricted, defunded, and blocked gender-affirming care—especially in the case of minors—as well as research and education related to transgender issues. It has utilized censorship of inclusive language for the purpose of anti-transgender policy and directed law enforcement and the FBI to investigate the promotion of "radical gender ideology". The Trump administration has undergone purges of transgender military personnel, prohibited transgender girls and women from participating in women's sports, discriminated against transgender inmates, and has created restrictions on passports and international travel for transgender people.

The Trump administration's actions targeting transgender people draw much of their design from the anti-transgender movement in the United Kingdom, and form part of the broader 2020s anti-LGBTQ movement in the United States and the anti-gender movement. The administration's actions have been referred to by some advocates as the early stages of genocide similar to that of persecution of transgender people in Nazi Germany, arguing they seek to "marginalize them socially and economically".

== Background ==
In the years leading up to the 2024 United States presidential election, there were an increasing number of state level laws and bans targeting transgender people. Anti-transgender campaigning was a large part of the Trump campaign, with spending on anti-transgender advertising being greater than spending on advertising discussing housing, immigration, or the economy. At multiple times throughout the campaign, Trump made false claims that schools were performing "gender-affirming surgeries on children without their parents' consent." Trump promised during his campaign that, if elected, he would sign an executive order instructing every federal agency to cease the promotion of sex or gender transition at any age, and promised to crack down on gender-affirming care for all ages.

Project 2025, which was published in 2023, detailed many of the goals of policies targeting transgender people that have since been implemented during the second Trump presidency. The administration's actions targeting transgender people have also drawn from the actions of the anti-transgender movement in the United Kingdom over the 2010s and 2020s.

== Executive orders ==
Following his second inauguration on January 20, 2025, Trump began issuing a series of executive orders targeting transgender people across the United States.

=== Executive Order 14168 ===
On January 20, 2025, shortly after being inaugurated, Trump signed an Executive Order, which defined sex to the federal government as a male-female binary, with "female" and "male" defined as "a person belonging, at conception to the sex that produces the large reproductive cell" and a "person belonging, at conception, to the sex that produces the small reproductive cell", respectively. The order also mandated that:

- Federal agencies use "sex" instead of "gender", remove materials that "promote gender ideology", and halt "funding of gender ideology"
- Official government documents such as passports and visas prohibit self-selection of gender
- Transgender people be barred from government-funded single-sex facilities congruent with their gender identity
- The Bureau of Prisons halt federal funding for gender-affirming care.
- Federal funding no longer be used for gender-affirming care
- The attorney general provide guidance to "correct the misapplication of the Supreme Court's decision in Bostock v. Clayton County (2020) to sex-based distinctions" in federal agency activities
- Prior policies and federal documents inconsistent with itself be rescinded, including policies requiring the use of names and pronouns consistent with a person's gender identity in federal workplaces.

Trump defended the order by stating it would protect women from "men masquerading as women".

Provisions of the order have faced legal challenges, with temporary restraining orders having been issued to suspend the withholding of federal funding to programs that fund gender-affirming care and promote "gender ideology", the forced transfers of transgender inmates to facilities congruent with their sex assigned at birth, and the mass removal of documents published by the Centers for Disease Control and Prevention, Food and Drug Administration, and the Department of Health and Human Services that mention topics related to "gender ideology".

In July 2025, the federal government shut down specialized services for LGBTQ youth through its Suicide and Crisis Lifeline, stating that such services encouraged children to "to embrace radical gender ideology".

In July 2025, The Lancet published an investigation which alleged that around half of all U.S. health datasets were secretly and substantially altered in the two months after the executive order was signed, with the alterations being done to remove messages that "promote or otherwise inculcate gender ideology".

In October 2025, the Trump administration blocked student loan forgiveness for any public worker or group who takes part in providing gender-affirming care to transgender youth.

In November 2025, after the Supreme Court of the United States ruled that gender markers in passports could be restricted, the State Department introduced a policy to comply with the executive order that required passports issued to transgender people to mark the gender initially recorded on their birth certificates, superseding the prior policy that had been in place since 1992.

==== Word blacklisting ====
In January 2025, a list of "forbidden terms" was reportedly distributed within the government's health-related agencies, instructing employees to avoid certain words, including "gender", "transgender", or "LGBT". Such words were also widely removed from websites run by multiple different federal agencies, including the National Park Service Stonewall National Monument website. Editors at scientific journals, such as The BMJ and the European Journal of Public Health, objected to the policy. Scientific grants were revoked or reviewed on the basis of that LGBT topics had been mentioned in the research.

=== Executive Order 14183 ===
On January 27, 2025, Trump signed an executive order declaring that a soldier being transgender "conflicts with a soldier's commitment to an honorable, truthful, and disciplined lifestyle, even in one's personal life" and that transgender people "cannot satisfy the rigorous standards necessary for military service".

On March 18, 2025, Judge Ana C. Reyes blocked the executive order, ruling that banning transgender people from the military likely violated their constitutional rights.

A May 15 memo later detailed how transgender service members would be discharged, saying that they would be given the discharge code of "JDK", which is typically used to indicate that a soldier is considered a threat to national security, and which can prevent them from getting future jobs or security clearances. An August 4 United States Air Force memo announced that long-serving transgender members normally eligible for retirement benefits would be denied them. A memo sent out at the beginning of October advised that unit commanders could override the decisions of separation boards if the separation boards determined that transgender service personnel could remain in service.

=== Executive Order 14187 ===
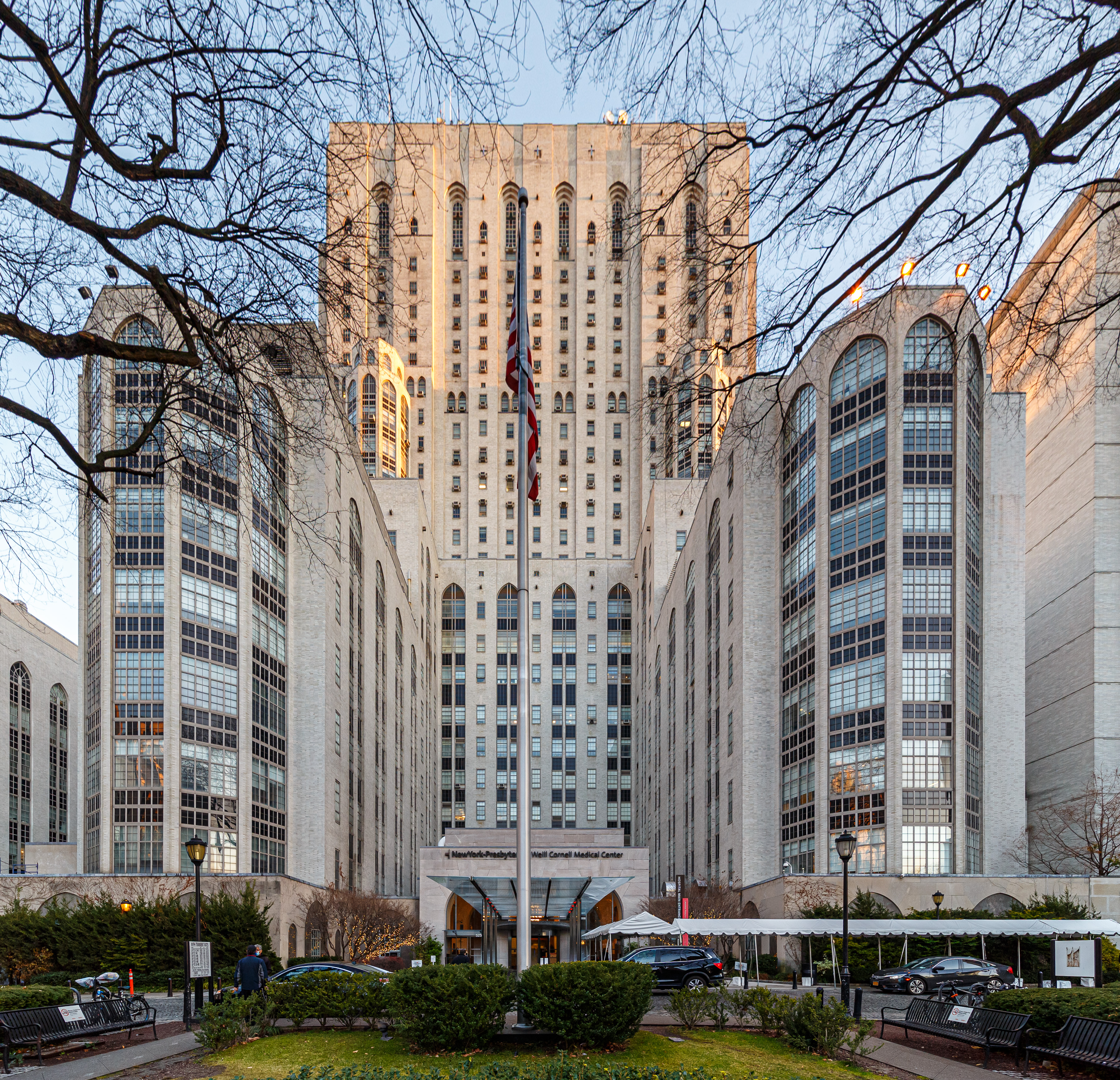
New York-Presbyterian Hospital canceled some appointments for gender-affirming care in response to Executive Order 14187.

On January 28, 2025, Trump signed an executive order to "Protect Children from Chemical and Surgical Mutilation". The order described gender-affirming care for minors as "chemical and surgical mutilation of children" as well as "maiming" and "sterilizing". It stated "countless children" who received such care would regret a "horrifying tragedy that they will never be able to conceive children of their own or nurture their children through breastfeeding". The order also described the World Professional Association for Transgender Health's (WPATH) guidance as "junk science".

The order states that the U.S. Federal Government will not "fund, sponsor, promote, assist, or support the so-called 'transition' of a child from one sex to another". The provisions include:

- Directing the United States Department of Health and Human Services to review the terms of insurance under Medicare, Medicaid, and the Affordable Care Act to end certain gender affirming care;
- Telling federal agencies providing federal grants to medical institutions to make sure those institutions were not carrying out any gender-related procedures;
- Protecting whistleblowers who report on institutions that provide gender affirming care in violation of the executive order.

NBC News described the language in the executive order as inflammatory and noted that major medical associations support access to transgender health care for minors.

In response, some hospitals paused providing gender-affirming care for minors, while others continued. Some hospitals cancelled care for even those older than 19. Attorney generals from 15 states said their states are committed to continuing to provide gender-affirming care to minors. Multiple groups filed lawsuits challenging the legality of the executive order. In response to one of the lawsuits, several federal judges issued injunctions blocking the government from withholding federal funds from hospitals that provide gender affirming care to minors. Following the injunction, some hospitals that initially paused gender-affirming care for minors resumed the care.

In the summer of 2025, the Department of Justice began sending subpoenas to "over 20" hospitals demanding the full records of patients who received medical care under 19 – including their names, social security numbers, doctors' notes, and treatments prescribed. This practice continued into 2026, expanding to many more hospitals across the nation.

On October 30, 2025, NPR reported on proposed rules from the Department of Health and Human Services that would prohibit federal Medicaid reimbursement for medical care provided to transgender patients under 18, and block Medicaid and Medicare funding for any services at hospitals that provide gender-affirming care to children. NPR also highlighted that at the time of writing gender-affirming care for children was already banned in 27 states.

The executive order is similar to a portion of Project 2025 that called for withdrawing "guidance issued under the Biden Administration concerning sexual orientation and gender identity under Section 1557" of the Affordable Care Act.

=== Executive Order 14190 ===
On January 29, 2025, Trump signed an executive order "Ending Radical Indoctrination in K-12 Schooling". Under the order, law enforcement are directed to conduct investigations of educational or education-related institutions suspected of involvement in the "instruction, advancement, or promotion of gender ideology" declaring such ideas to be anti-American and subversive.

The order further directs law enforcement to criminally prosecute any teacher who "unlawfully facilitates" the social transition of a transgender minor. Listed examples of unlawful facilitation include psychiatric counseling by a school counselor, referring to the student using their preferred name and/or pronouns, referring to a student as "non-binary", and allowing the student to use segregated facilities or participate on segregated sports teams differing from those of their assigned sex. The order directs that educators in violation of this law be prosecuted as having committed sexual exploitation of a minor, and/or practicing medicine without a license. Additionally, schools found in violation would have their federal funding revoked.

In August 2025 the Trump administration threatened to pull federal funding from sex education programs that mention transgender people, whom it referred to as "gender ideology." By November 2025, 11 states and 2 territories had complied with the threat.

=== Executive Order 14201 ===
On February 5, 2025, Trump signed an executive order titled "Keeping Men Out of Women's Sports", which directs federal agencies and state attorneys general to immediately enforce a prohibition of transgender girls and women from participating in women's sports. The order does not ban transgender men athletes from playing on male sports teams. As part of this order's implementation, the Department of Education urged high school and college athletics organizations NCAA and NFHS to revoke transgender female athletes' records and restore cisgender athletes' records. The State Department also announced a ban on transgender athletes from entering the United States if they attempt to compete in women's sports, and said that visa applicants suspected of such would have their file marked with the letters 'SWS25' for the purposes of tracking. Visa applicants for any purpose who list a gender other than their assigned sex on their visa application will be permanently banned from entering the United States on grounds of "fraud". Later Trump threatened to impose fines on California due to a transgender athlete competing in the 2025 California high school track and field championship, coinciding with a lawsuit filed by the federal government against California for allowing transgender athletes to compete in the gender categories that do not match their assigned sex at birth.

=== Rescinding former orders ===
On January 20, 2025, Trump rescinded Executive Order 13988. The executive order had sought to protect LGBTQ rights in federal prisons and prevent discrimination.

== Law enforcement ==
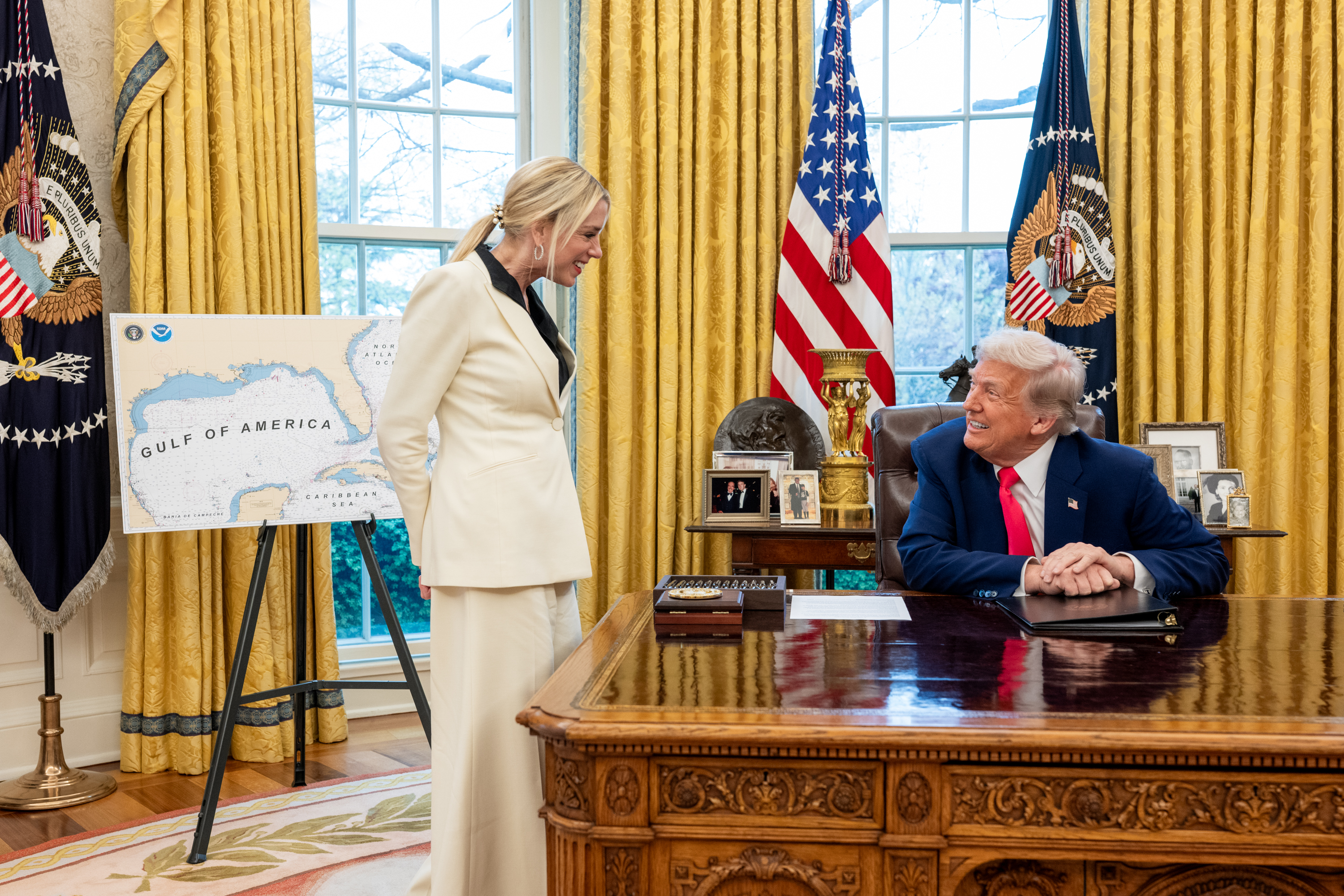
Pam Bondi with Donald Trump in the Oval Office, April 2025

=== FBI targeting ===
In December 2025, Attorney General Pam Bondi instructed the FBI to begin offering cash bounties for information leading to the identification and arrest of transgender activists promoting what she referred to as "radical gender ideology", and described such activists as "domestic terrorist groups".

In May 2026, The White House published its "United States Counterterrorism Strategy" which said that "In addition to cartels and Islamist terror groups, our national CT activities will also prioritize the rapid identification and neutralization of violent secular political groups whose ideology is anti-American, radically pro-transgender, and anarchist."

=== Prisons ===
==== Federal prison ====
From 2025, the Federal Bureau of Prisons stopped reporting on the number of transgender prisoners held. Beginning in 2026, the Federal Bureau of Prisons adopted new policies based on policies in Florida that mandated conversion therapy for transgender inmates. Under the federal policy, transgender inmates would have their hair cut short, be taken off hormone medication, and instead be put into psychiatric therapy and given psychiatric drugs. Imprisoned transgender individuals reported that they were being denied access to care.

==== ICE detention ====
Transgender men in ICE custody under the Trump administration have reportedly been specifically subjected to forced labor programs, with justifications given by guards including "If you wanna be a man, I'll treat you like a man" and "Aren't you strong enough? Aren't you a man?". Those who refused faced punishments including beatings and solitary confinement, with many also reporting severe sexual abuse. Transgender inmates are also routinely denied access to medical care, both gender related and non-gender related, leading regular illnesses in transgender detainees to go untreated due to doctors' refusal. Data is hard to come by, however, as starting in 2025, ICE stopped complying with a federal law which required them to report data on transgender people in their custody.

==== Removal of protections against sexual violence in prison ====
Under Trump, the Department of Justice has issued instruction to inspectors to stop evaluating prisons and jails using standards designed to protect transgender and intersex people from sexual assault. According to data from the 2015 US transgender survey, transgender, intersex and gender-nonconforming people are uniquely vulnerable to such violence.

The rule change did not follow the usual process, but was done through a memo which instructs PREA inspectors to mark trans-related standards as 'not applicable'. Executive director of Just Detention International, Linda McFarlane, stated that this "will immediately put people in danger." Deputy director of the Bureau of Justice Assistance, Tammie Gregg, said that the policy was to align practices in prisons with Executive Order 14168.

=== Proposed ban on keeping firearms ===
On September 4, 2025, multiple news organizations reported that the Department of Justice under Attorney General Pam Bondi was looking into ways to limit transgender individuals' right to keep and bear arms. The discussions came in the aftermath of the Annunciation Catholic Church shooting, which, according to the Associated Press (AP), was perpetrated by a transgender person. The potential limitations drew condemnation from both LGBTQ rights groups as well as gun rights advocacy groups, such as the Gun Owners of America and the National Rifle Association (NRA), with the latter groups opposing blanket gun bans. The NRA said, "the NRA supports the Second Amendment rights of all law-abiding Americans to purchase, possess and use firearms. NRA does not, and will not, support any policy proposals that implement sweeping gun bans that arbitrarily strip law-abiding citizens of their Second Amendment rights without due process". Per the AP, "LGBTQ advocates called it misguided and dangerous as the vast majority of mass shootings in the U.S. are carried out by men and do not involve transgender people".

=== Reporting ===
In the annual National Crime Victimization Survey run by the Department of Justice removed any questions relating to gender identity and hate crimes based on transgender status.

== Federal level actions ==
On January 28, 2025, Trump ordered a freeze on all federal funding grants, loans, and aid while those receiving them were assessed to make sure they were not promoting "Marxist equity, transgenderism, and green new deal social engineering policies". Multiple organizations subsequently challenged their grant and funding freezes, with nine groups having funding partially restored by July 2025. In April 2025, after the Maine Department of Corrections refused to move a transgender inmate to an opposite gender prison, Pam Bondi claimed on Fox & Friends that $1.5 million in federal funding was being withheld from the Maine Department of Corrections in response.

Legal writers for Slate and the Washington University Law Review have argued that the second Trump administration's policies restrain transgender people's right to vote, or constitute voter disenfranchisement, citing the combination of the U.S. Department of State's 2025 restrictions for transgender people's passports, and the proposed requirement that certain identity documents (which require a gender marker and could include a passport) be presented in order to vote. Other legal writers have previously highlighted the impact that such state level laws have had on transgender voter disenfranchisement.

=== Actions to ban gender-affirming care ===
==== Congress ====
On December 17, 2025, the House of Representatives voted to pass H.R. 3492, the Protect Children's Innocence Act, a bill sponsored by Marjorie Taylor Greene that would criminalize parents, children, and doctors providing gender-affirming care to transgender youth. The House passage of the bill was condemned by the American Civil Liberties Union.

==== Executive branch ====
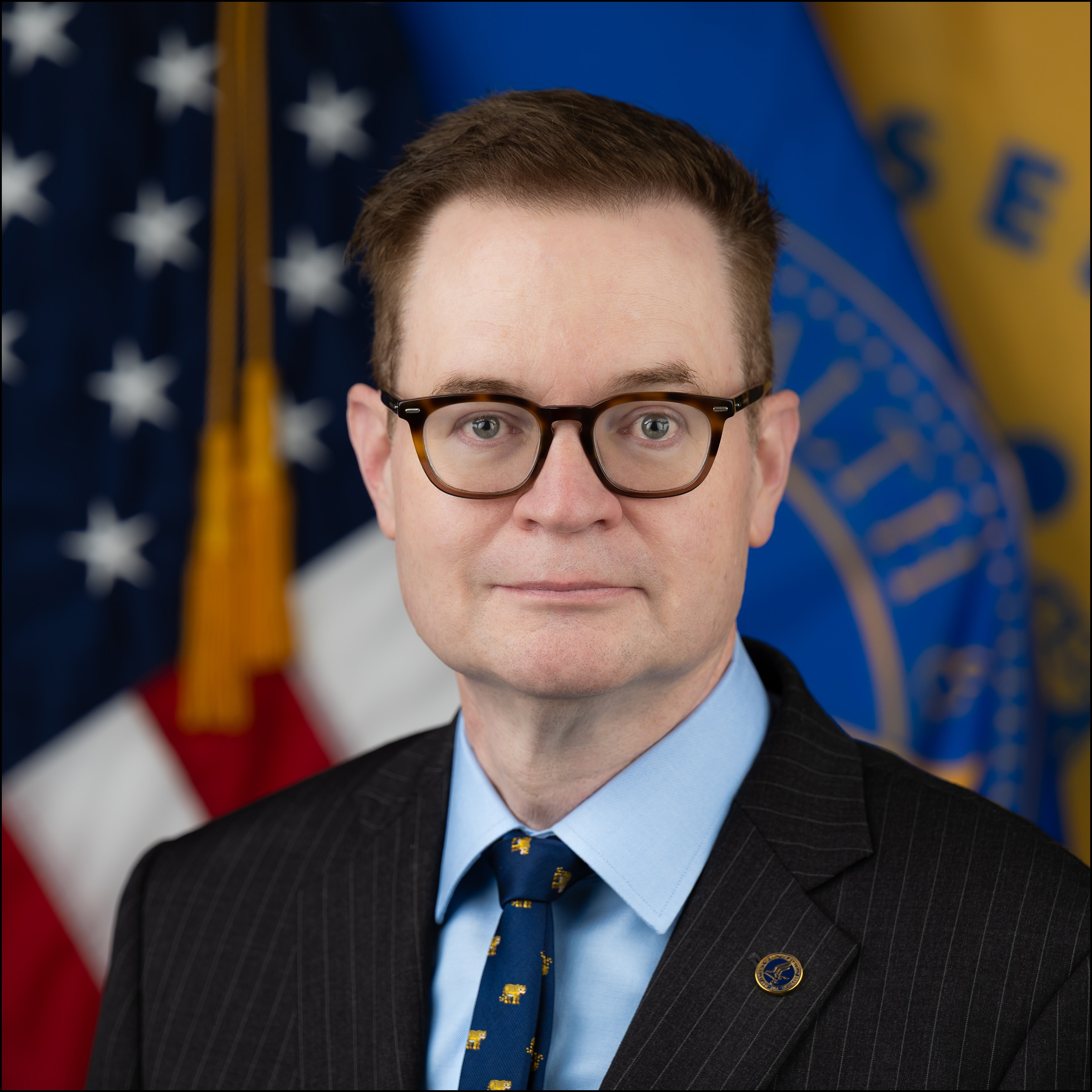
Department of Health and Human Services Deputy Secretary Jim O'Neill discussed the department's views on transgender people at the December 18, 2025 news conference.

The administration restricted access to gender-affirming care.

On December 18, 2025, Secretary of Health and Human Services Robert F. Kennedy Jr. issued a declaration, effective immediately, that prohibited Medicare and Medicaid funding from being issued for any purpose to hospitals that offer gender-affirming care to minors. The declaration referred to gender-affirming care as "sex-rejecting procedures" that were "neither safe nor effective as a treatment modality for gender dysphoria, gender incongruence, or other related disorders in minors". At the news conference, Health and Human Services Deputy Secretary Jim O'Neill affirmed the department's stance on two sexes and that people can not transition, stating that "at the root of the evils we face, is a hatred for nature as God designed it and for life as it was meant to be lived." The declaration was criticized by politicians, health officials, and LGBTQ rights activists.

A lawsuit was filed by Oregon and 21 other states seeking to vacate the declaration, arguing that it circumvented standard rulemaking procedures. In April 2026, Oregon district judge Mustafa T. Kasubhai vacated the declaration, ruling that the Department of Health and Human Services exceeded its authority by attempting to unilaterally establish standards of care, violated the Administrative Procedure Act by circumventing the required notice and comment process, and violated Medicare statutes prohibiting federal officials from exercising "supervision or control over the practice of medicine or the manner in which medical services are provided."

In May 2026, federal judge James Boasberg issued a preliminary injunction blocking a probe by the Federal Trade Commission into the Endocrine Society and WPATH, ruling that they were unconstitutional and based on politically-motivated animus.

=== Deportations ===
As part of the broader deportations in the second Trump administration, transgender individuals have been deported to third countries which have no protections for transgender individuals, or LGBTQ+ people.

== State-level actions ==
Several Republican-run states have followed the lead of the Trump administration on transgender issues, enacting legislation to limit access to healthcare, government services, and public life for transgender people.

As of 2025, more than half of U.S. states—mostly Republican-led states—had enacted state level bans on gender-affirming care for minors. In June 2025, the Supreme Court ruled in United States v. Skrmetti that Tennessee's ban discriminated on age and medical use. While discrimination on the basis of sex is subject to heightened intermediate scrutiny, discriminating on age and medical use is subject to rational basis review, which the court ruled Tennessee's law satisfied. On March 10, 2026, the United States Court of Appeals for the Fourth Circuit ruled in Anderson v. Crouch that West Virginia may prohibit gender-affirming procedures for adults from being covered by Medicaid, arguing that the law applied to procedures and not individuals, and that it was "not irrational for a legislature to encourage citizens to appreciate their sex".

In February 2025, Alabama and several other states introduced legislation to define gender to be congruent with sex assigned at birth, following on from Trump's executive order declaring the same.

In August 2025, the Texas State Legislature introduced Senate Bill 8 (SB8), a bathroom bill that would restrict transgender people's access to public bathrooms that match their gender. Under the bill, facilities could be fined up to $125,000 per offense, as well as authorizing private citizens reports.

Also in August 2025, Alaskan republican Matt Heilala introduced a draft to the Alaska State Medical Board that would discipline any medical providers in the states that are providing gender-affirming care for youth. The board unanimously approved the proposal on August 22, 2025 without public input on the proposal. Heilala announced his immediate resignation following the conclusion of the meeting, and announced his plan to run for Governor of Alaska at the next election. In response, Tom Pittman, executive director of Anchorage-based advocacy and health care organization Identity Inc, said that "nearly 700 Alaska medical professionals have signed an open letter opposing the changes being considered by the board."

In September 2025, Republican representative Josh Schriver introduced House Bill 4938 in Michigan. The "Anticorruption of Public Morals Act" seeks to ban pornography, virtual private networks, and depictions of transgender people online.

In early 2026 bills were also introduced or progressed that targeted transgender people in the state legislatures of Idaho, Oklahoma, and Utah.

In February 2026, Kansas passed a bill that contained both a bathroom ban with a private right of action for publicly-funded facilities and a ban on gender self-identification on state-issued identity documents such as driver's licenses. Many people who were flagged as potentially transgender in the government system were informed on February 25 that their ID and driver's licenses would become invalid the next day, without any grace period, so even driving to the Division of Vehicles office to apply for a new license could result in a $1,000 fine and 6 months in jail.

== Dehumanization, scapegoating and misinformation ==
Trump has repeatedly characterized transgender people as a societal menace, a corrupt elite, and a threat to children. Scholars and extremism experts have warned that the Trump administration's sustained targeting of transgender people—a group comprising less than 1% of the U.S. population—resembles authoritarian strategies that single out a vulnerable minority in order to consolidate power. Analysts have pointed to historical parallels, such as the Nazi destruction of the Institute for Sexual Research in 1933, where attacks on a visible queer institution were used to galvanize support for broader repression.

Civil rights groups also argue that the Trump administration's language opens the door to wider censorship and repression, noting that book bans and curriculum restrictions have increasingly targeted works on gender, sexuality, and racial justice under the banner of fighting "gender ideology." Idit Klein of Keshet, in response to Trump sharing an image of a pink triangle crossed out, said that such actions are "frighteningly reminiscent for both LGBTQ+ people and Jews of our long histories of persecution, which have included tactics we're seeing today, such as scapegoating, book bans, destruction of information access, and control/confiscation of identity documents like passports".

=== Transgender health care ===
In 2024, Trump falsely claimed that children were being given gender-affirming surgery at school, repeating it multiple times throughout his campaign, despite there being no evidence that any school in the United States had ever provided gender-affirming surgery to a student. Trump repeated such claims in his 2026 State of the Union Address.

The New York Times has noted that Trump's directives and speeches regularly use terms such as "maiming" or "junk science" to describe gender-affirming care and the research that supports it. The New York Times themselves have often run misinformation pieces on transgender healthcare which, according to a former journalist there, was part of a project to win favor with the Trump administration, with pieces by The New York Times being cited in Republican legislative and judicial filings to justify restrictions and rollbacks of transgender rights. Trump has called being transgender "lunacy" and "insanity," insisted in speeches that "there are only two genders, male and female," and ridiculed transgender athletes at campaign rallies to cheers from his supporters. Fact-checks of his 2025 State of the Union address noted that Trump falsely claimed taxpayer dollars were spent on "making mice transgender," mischaracterizing NIH-funded medical research into hormone therapy and HIV treatment.

=== Violence by transgender people ===
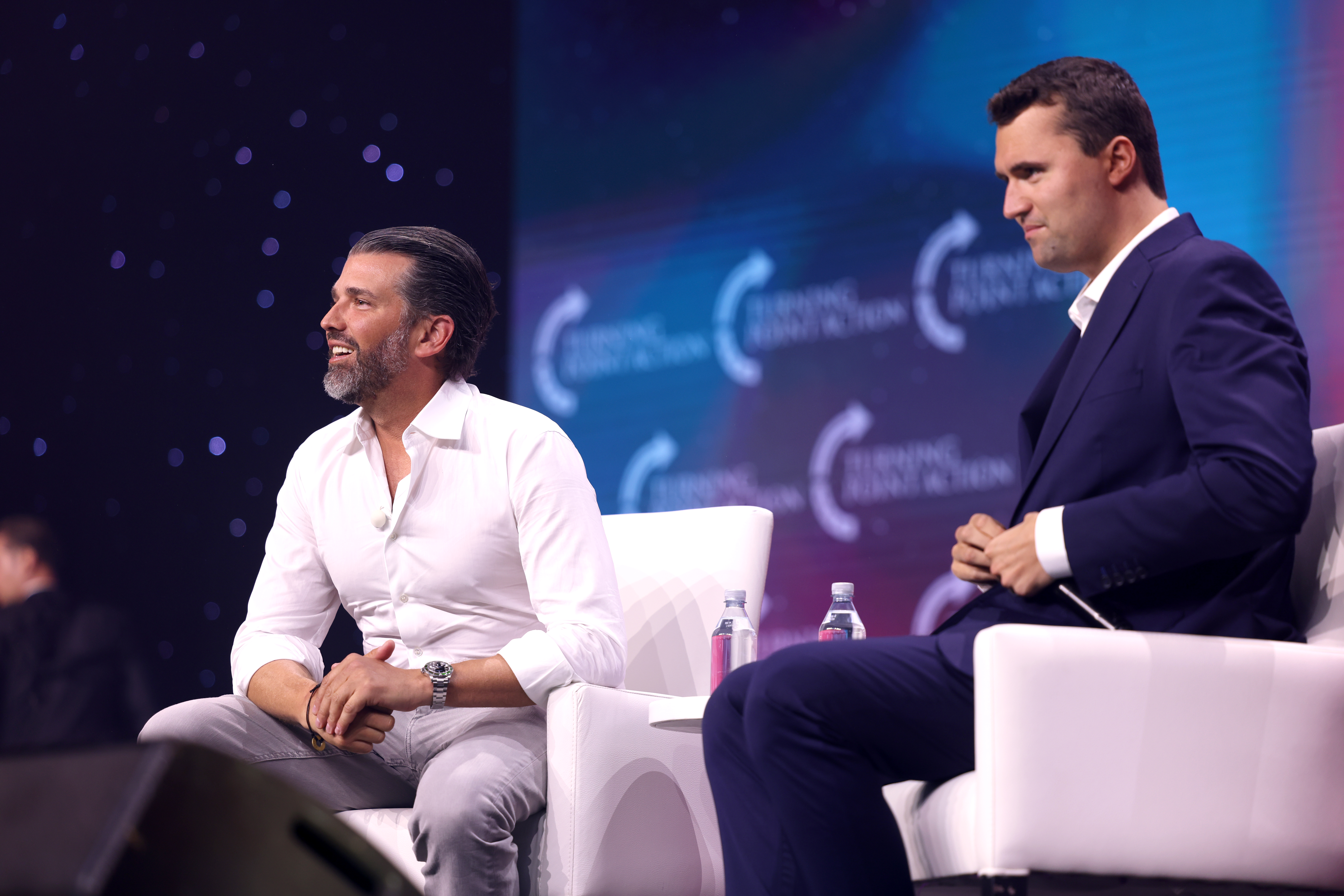
Donald Trump Jr. and Charlie Kirk have both spread misinformation about violence by transgender people.

NPR and other outlets have documented a broader pattern in which Trump and allied Republicans seize on mass shootings and other tragedies to falsely identify perpetrators as transgender, part of a political strategy to scapegoat a small minority group. Experts on extremism and disinformation have warned that such rhetoric deliberately fosters fear and division, echoing earlier authoritarian tactics to rally support by vilifying minorities. Claims that the shooter was transgender happen "almost every time there is a school shooting in America", according to USA Today. Michael Jensen, research director at the National Consortium for the Study of Terrorism and Responses to Terrorism, was quoted as saying, "I'm aware of no evidence to support the claim that transgender people are disproportionately responsible for mass violence events in the U.S., including shootings in schools. In fact, the data suggests quite the opposite."

Throughout the 2020s, false accusations have been spread by individuals associated with the MAGA movement that transgender people commit acts of violence at a higher rate than cisgender people. In 2025, conservative commentator Matt Wallace falsely blamed the 2025 Potomac River mid-air collision on an uninvolved transgender pilot, claiming it might be "...another trans terror attack." Other conservative figures including Donald Trump Jr. and Ronny Jackson have claimed that transgender people commit disproportionately more violence than other groups, and disinformation around the rate at which transgender people commit violence has spread in conservative media.

In the wake of the assassination of Charlie Kirk, transgender people were almost immediately subject to accusations of responsibility, especially after The Wall Street Journal falsely reported that an internal ATF memo stated that messages were engraved on the cases of the shooter's ammo which expressed "transgender and anti-fascist ideology." Conservative commentator Joey Mannarino, who had previously expressed his desire for transgender people to be "rounded up, detained and studied", posted on the social media platform X, "If the person who killed Charlie Kirk was a transgender, there can be no mercy for that species any longer. We've already tolerated far too much [from] those creatures". A trans woman from Seattle was accused by numerous conservatives on social media of being the shooter. As a result, she received hundreds of abusive messages, including death threats. The Heritage Foundation has requested that the FBI label "transgender extremists" as a domestic terror threat. In May 2026, the White House issued a counterterrorism strategy seeking to prioritize the "neutralization" of "violent secular political groups whose ideology is anti-American, radically pro-transgender, and anarchist."

Numbers vary across study and methodology, depending on factors such as how such crimes are defined, but they do not show a disproportionate rate of violence among transgender people. According to an analysis by the Poynter Institute, transgender people represent 0.1–1.5% of shooters in the US, and make up 0.5–1.6% of the population. Experts on gun violence agree that transgender people do not represent a disproportionate threat, with human security professor Laura Dugan calling the threat of transgender shooters "just not a concern".

== In healthcare ==
=== Hospital settlements ===
In 2025, the Trump administration began investigating hospitals for billing fraud related to gender-affirming care for minors.

To end these investigations and avoid having to turn over patients' private records to the government, multiple hospitals have reached settlements with the Trump administration, which involve them paying a fine, among other conditions. Some, but not all, of the settlements also require the hospital allot a certain amount of funding to providing detransition treatments. One hospital, Texas Children's, will also be required to open a dedicated detransition clinic.

All of the settlements also require the hospital to end gender-affirming care for minors for a certain amount of time that varies in each settlement. Some legal experts have noted that the settlements could be dissolved sooner than scheduled, noting that some of the settlements, like UPMC's, contain language that would terminate the settlement if a court finds it to be in violation of federal or state law. It also contains language allowing the agreement to be altered or scraped entirely if agreed to mutually by the hospital and a more favorable future DOJ.

All of the hospitals that have settled have denied the allegations made in the Trump administration's investigations. The hospitals also insist the settlements will not impact their ability to provide mental healthcare to trans youth.

The settlements have been widely and heavily condemned by LGBTQ advocates, human rights groups, Democratic politicians and the hospital's patients, who have labeled it a "capitulation".

In certain Democrat-controlled states, questions have been raised about whether the settlement violates the state's anti-discrimination laws by requiring treatments like hormone therapy to be provided to detransitioners, but banning the same treatment for youth seeking to transition.

- On May 15, 2026, the DOJ announced that it had secured a settlement with Texas Children's Hospital (TCH) and the Texas attorney general. The settlement requires TCH to pay over $10 million in fines to the government and dedicate additional millions to providing detransition services. The settlement also requires the hospital to open the nation's first detransition clinic, at which treatment will be offered for free for the first five years, as well as permanently cease offering gender-affirming care to trans youth, among other conditions. Gender-affirming care was already unavailable to minors in Texas due to a state law banning it. The hospital also claimed it already offered treatment to patients seeking to detransition, and that the detransition clinic "simply provides structure and a name for the services we currently provide".
- On June 5, 2026, the DOJ announced that it had secured a settlement with Cleveland Clinic and the Ohio attorney general. Per the settlement, Cleveland Clinic will be required to pay $308,000 to the government and dedicate $2 million to providing detransition care. Additionally, the settlement requires Cleveland Clinic to stop providing gender-affirming care to minors for twenty years. Cleveland Clinic attempted to downplay the settlement, saying that "not much is changing" and emphasizing that they already did not provide gender-affirming care for minors due to a state law banning it and also had "always offered services to patients wanting to detransition and that the settlement simply indicates a commitment to continuing to do so."
- On August 5, 2026, the DOJ announced that it had secured a settlement with Connecticut Children's Medical Center (CCMC). The settlement requires CCMC to pay a $60,000 fine to the federal government, dedicate $500,000 to providing detransition services and stop providing gender-affirming care to minors for ten years. The full terms of the settlement have not been made public, but copies of it have been obtained by the state's human services committee in a subsequent investigation into whether the settlement violates state law. CCMC had already stopped offering gender-affirming care to patients under 19 in July 2025 following pressure from the Trump administration.
- On September 4, 2026, the DOJ announced that it had secured a settlement with Mount Sinai. The settlement requires Mount Sinai to pay an undisclosed fine to the federal government, dedicate $2 million to providing detransition services and stop providing gender-affirming care to minors for an undisclosed amount of time. Days after the settlement was announced, protests were held outside of Mount Sinai criticizing the settlement. Mount Sinai had already stopped offering gender-affirming care to minors in July 2025 following pressure from the Trump administration.
- On September 18, 2026, the DOJ announced that it had secured a settlement with NYU Langone. The settlement requires NYU Langone to pay $8.5 million to the federal government and stop providing gender-affirming care to minors for an undisclosed amount of time. Unlike the previous settlements, this one did not require the hospital to put any money into detransition services. Days after the settlement was announced, hundreds protested outside of NYU Langone criticizing the settlement. NYU Langone had already stopped offering gender-affirming care to minors in February 2026 following pressure from the Trump administration, but had begun canceling appointments as early as February 2025 after Trump's executive order threatening to withhold federal funding to hospitals that provide gender-affirming care to people under 19.
- On September 18, 2026, the DOJ announced that it had secured a settlement with University of Pittsburgh Medical Center (UPMC). The settlement requires UPMC to pay $950,000 to the federal government and stop providing gender-affirming care to patients under 19 for ten years. Unlike some of the previous settlements, this one did not require the hospital to put any money into detransition services. UPMC had already stopped offering gender-affirming care to patients under 19 in June 2025 after receiving a subpoena from the Trump administration relating to its gender-affirming care program for trans youth. Following the settlement, a protest was held outside of UPMC criticizing them for agreeing to the settlement.

== In the arts ==
In response to Executive Order 14168, the National Endowment for the Arts began forcing all grant applicants to agree not to promote "gender ideology".

Following this, the Trump Administration removed from publicly-run museums works which depicted transgender topics or which were made by transgender artists, with The New Yorker describing this by saying that the administration was "just as likely to censor a painting of a trans person by a cis woman as a painting of a cis woman by a trans person". One example such was the National Portrait Gallery removing Amy Sherald's painting "Trans Forming America", which depicted the Statue of Liberty as a Black trans woman.

Likewise, privately run institutions began censoring and removing the works of transgender artists as well, in what was speculated by some to be a move to appease donors.

Transgender writers, especially trans women, faced extreme difficulty in getting their work published, with many forced to turn to self-publishing in order to bring their work to audiences. However, this too became difficult as payment processors began to demand that platforms censor works related to LGBTQ topics.

In April 2026, the Federal Communications Commission (FCC) launched a public review of the TV Parental Guidelines ratings system on the inclusion of "gender identity issues" in children's television programming.

== In academia ==
The National Science Foundation compiled an internal list of words which, if present in a research paper, grant application, or other relevant documentation, would flag a project and put its funding under review. Words that would initiate a review included "gender", "LGBT", and "women", among others. Some transgender scholars reported having their fellowships cut, and being told by the federal government that it was for "promoting gender ideology".

NASA took down webpages relating to LGBTQ+ employee resource groups and diversity at the organization, and according to employees, verbally informed its employees that any display of LGBTQ+ symbols, such as a pride flag in one's workspace, would result in the employee being placed on administrative leave.

=== Universities ===
Many major universities during this time, either faced with potential loss of federal funding, changes in state law, or simply of their own accord, began to implement restrictions both on the rights of transgender students and on the teaching of material related to gender identity. This included barring transgender students from gender-segregated housing and facilities, banning transgender athletes and stripping away any previously won accolades, firing professors who gave instruction that contravened the Trump Administration's position on transgender people, ceasing the provision of gender affirming hormone therapy to transgender students, and destroying books that covered transgender topics.

In May 2026, the administration announced that it was investigating Smith College, a women's college in Northampton, Massachusetts, for allowing transgender students to attend, alleging that the policy was a violation of Title IX.

== International actions ==
The Trump administration's anti-transgender agenda has not been confined to U.S. borders but has also been aggressively promoted in international forums, particularly at the United Nations. American delegates have repeatedly objected to the inclusion of the word "gender" in resolutions across a wide range of issues, from global health and women's rights to environmental treaties on chemical pollution. By insisting that only "biological sex" be recognized in official documents, U.S. representatives have disrupted negotiations, slowed consensus-building, and aligned American positions with those of more repressive regimes.

Human rights experts warn that these interventions send a global signal that the rights of transgender, non-binary, and intersex people are negotiable, undermining decades of international progress toward gender equality. The Trump administration has also tied its stance to broader nationalist goals, suggesting that foreign aid may be contingent on countries adopting similar language, thereby leveraging U.S. power to export its anti-trans policies abroad.

The 2024 Country Reports on Human Rights Practices that was released under the second Trump administration was noted for the complete removal of any mention of discrimination and violence against LGBTQ people compared to previous reports.

During the 90 day pause on aid funding, a waiver was issued to continue providing HIV treatment during the pause, but this waiver excluded the provision of such treatment for gay men, bisexual men, and transgender women.

=== Foreign policy ===
Soon after coming to office, in 2025 the U.S. under Trump withdrew from its position in the U.N. LGBTI Core Group.

At the United Nations, the United States under Trump routinely uses their influence action against transgender rights globally, even when unrelated to the topic of discussion. For example, in a June 2025 meeting on chemical pollution, the American delegate made a point of repeatedly disputing any gender-related language that did not explicitly "recognize women are biologically female and men are biologically male"; in another case, the United States disapproved of a declaration supporting the rights of women and girls because it included no language to exclude trans women from its purview. Both advocates and the Trump Administration have suggested that the United States might use compliance at the UN as a metric for determining which countries receive foreign aid.

In January 2026, the Trump administration expanded the Mexico City Rule, which blocked funding or aid to any organization providing or promoting abortion, to likewise block funding and aid to any organization that takes part in or promotes "gender ideology".

In March 2026, the Trump administration successfully pressured the International Olympic Committee (IOC) into banning trans women and intersex athletes from competing in female events at the 2028 Summer Olympics and future Olympic games. All potential Olympic athletes must undergo a one-time SRY screening before being permitted to compete in the female category. IOC president Kirsty Coventry stated that the new policy was "based on science" and was made because "it is absolutely clear that it would not be fair for biological males to compete in the female category". In a joint statement published several days before the official IOC announcement, over 100 human rights and other groups criticized the proposed rule change as "a blunt and discriminatory response that is not supported by science and violates international human rights law".

== Effects ==
=== Emigration and attempts at seeking asylum ===
The Trump administration's actions targeting transgender people have led some transgender Americans to seek refuge abroad. Advocacy organizations and media outlets reported an increase in transgender people leaving the United States or making plans to do so in response to the rollback of rights, workplace exclusions, and the Trump administration's rhetoric portraying transgender identities as a social threat.

In March 2025, Yes! documented cases of transgender asylum seekers in Mexico who cited fear of persecution under Trump's executive orders and anti-trans policies. These asylum seekers said that relocating was a matter of personal safety.

Canadian media reported U.S. transgender families preparing "go bags" and considering asylum after Trump's re-election, citing fears over bathroom bills, the loss of gender-affirming care, and restrictions on passports. Immigration attorneys in Canada reported a surge of inquiries from transgender and non-binary Americans seeking to relocate or claim asylum after Trump's January 2025 executive orders. Lawyers cited widespread fears over loss of gender-affirming care, restrictions on passports, and safety concerns, and noted that several test cases could establish precedent for U.S. transgender nationals claiming refugee protection in Canada. In July 2025, Justice Julie Blackhawk of the Canadian Federal Court blocked the deportation of a non-binary person who overstayed their visitor visa in Canada, pending further judicial rulings. Blackhawk ruled that the pre-removal risk assessment conducted by an immigration officer had "failed to consider recent evidence of the conditions that may have supported a reasonable fear of persecution" under present conditions for LGBTQ+ people in the United States.

In April 2025, the Green Party in Norway proposed granting asylum to transgender Americans on the grounds that they were being persecuted, with Green Party politician Karina Ødegård comparing their situation to marginalized groups in 1930s Germany. The proposal drew attention in European media and was framed as part of a broader debate about democratic backsliding and human rights in the United States. In August 2025, a 28-year-old transgender woman from California, Veronica Clifford-Carlos, challenged the Dutch government's rejection of her asylum claim. Her case, supported by the Dutch NGO LGBT Asylum Support, was described as the first of its kind in the Netherlands, which reported a rise in U.S. citizens applying for asylum since Trump's return to office.

=== Genocide debate ===
A number of advocacy and genocide-prevention groups have warned that the cumulative effect of federal and state measures targeting transgender people exhibits genocidal dynamics or "red flags," particularly when coupled with eliminationist rhetoric in public life. These analyses point to policies and statements seeking to remove legal recognition of transgender identity, restrict access to healthcare, and exclude transgender people from public institutions, and argue that such measures can inflict serious bodily or mental harm on an identifiable group. Commentary has also highlighted public calls to "eradicate transgenderism from public life," which critics characterize as eliminationist or genocidal rhetoric, even where speakers distinguish between "transgenderism" and transgender people.

Many legal scholars argue that transgender people do not meet the Genocide Convention's definition of a protected group, and as such the requirement of intent to physically or biologically destroy a protected group are not satisfied by policies that target transgender people as such, even if the measures cause serious harm. Legal scholarship from 2024 assessing state-level anti-trans legislation in the United States concluded that these actions likely did not meet the legal definition of genocide, while emphasizing the severity of harms imposed.

In January 2026, journalist Walker Bragman interviewed three genocide scholars who were concerned that the US was at the "early stages of committing genocide" against transgender people. Former presidents of the International Association of Genocide Scholars Henry Theriault and Gregory Stanton explained that the Trump administration wanted "to destroy a gender group," accuse them of corrupting traditional and family values, marginalize them socially and economically partly in order to urge them to kill themselves, and give tacit permission to law enforcers to use force specifically against them. Experts on genocide Stanton and Haley Brown deemed these tactics to be "directly borrowed from the Nazis."

=== Comparison to persecution of LGBTQ people in Nazi Germany ===
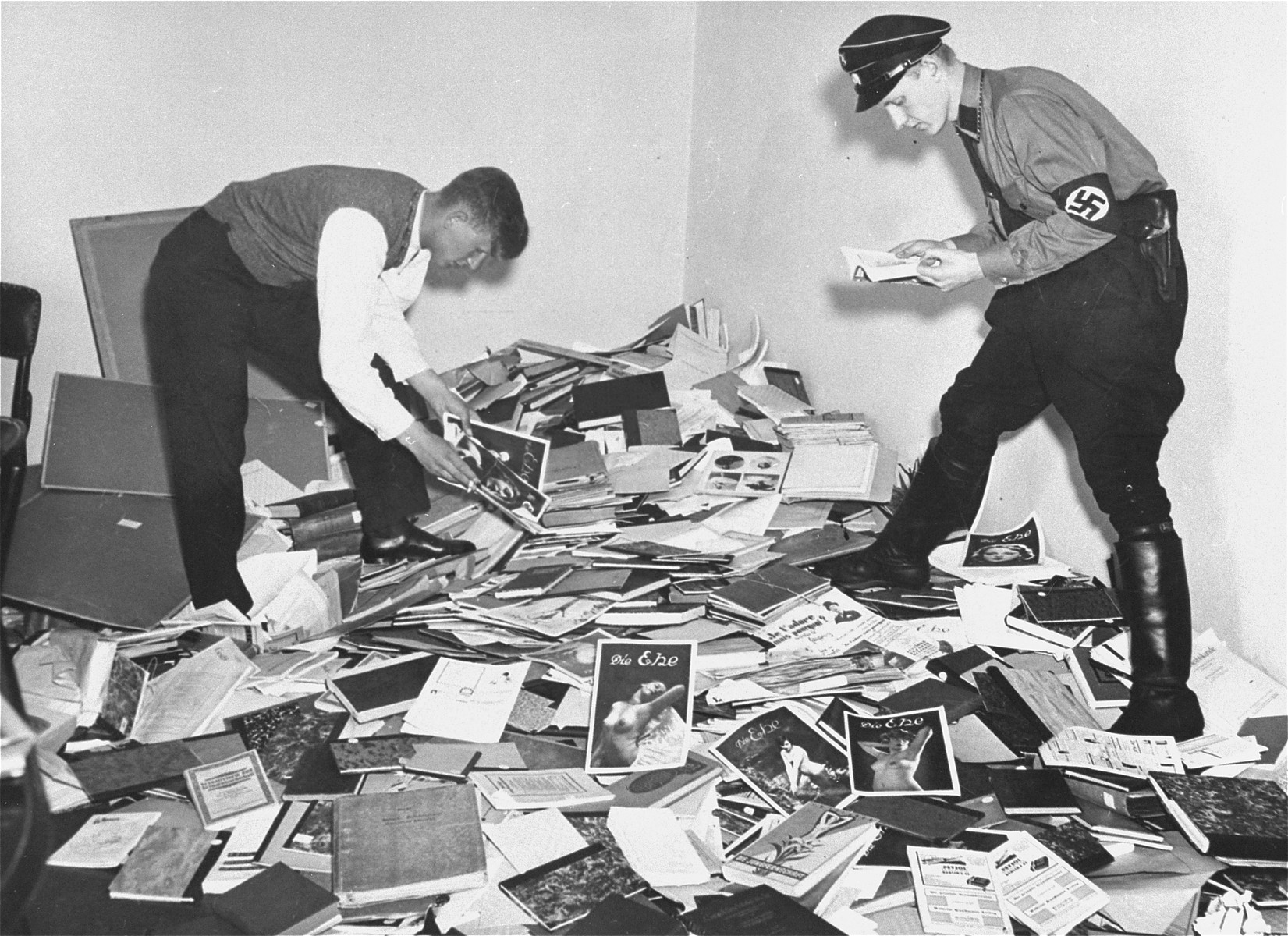
Raid on the Institute for Sexual Research by Nazis, May 6, 1933

Commentators and scholars have drawn parallels between the Trump administration's targeting of transgender people and the persecution of LGBTQ people in Nazi Germany. The erasure of research, censorship of language, and targeting of transgender people as a social threat have been repeatedly cited as bearing strong resemblance to the early stages of queer persecution under the Nazi regime.

In 1933, Nazi students destroyed the Institute for Sexual Research in Berlin, founded by Jewish sexologist Magnus Hirschfeld, which had pioneered studies of gender identity and medical transition. Its library of research on transgender and queer lives was burned, an act widely seen as the beginning of the Nazi regime's systematic erasure of queer culture and knowledge. LGBTQ people were later targeted under the Nazi regime through imprisonment, medical experimentation, and, in the case of homosexual men, internment marked by the pink triangle symbol. Several observers have compared this destruction of knowledge with the Trump administration's removal of federal webpages and health datasets referencing transgender populations in early 2025, following executive orders banning "gender ideology." Entire sections of research on HIV, contraceptive use, health equity, and workplace discrimination disappeared from government sites. Critics have described these actions as a form of internet-age book burning.

Parallels have also been drawn between Nazi use of broad ideological categories such as "un-German" and the Trump administration's emphasis on opposing "DEI" or "gender ideology." According to scholars, both function as umbrella terms that designate targeted groups as enemies of the nation and justify their exclusion from public life.

=== Condemnation ===
On January 28, 2025, over 170 women's rights organizations, led by the National Women's Law Center, issued an open letter condemning Executive Order 14168. The letter described the order, which defined legal recognition of women strictly by reproductive biology and sought to restrict transgender rights, as "cruel and lawless." The organizations argued that its true intent was to stigmatize and discriminate against transgender, non-binary, and intersex people while enforcing gender stereotypes.

On November 18, 2025, 213 Democratic representatives signed a letter to House speaker Mike Johnson condemning the use of "demonizing and dehumanizing" language about transgender people.

== See also ==
- Transphobia in the United States – Prejudice against Americans of other gender identity than assigned at birth
- Transgender disenfranchisement in the United States
- Human rights in the United States
