= Time to Think (book) =

2023 book by Hannah Barnes

Time to Think: The Inside Story of the Collapse of the Tavistock's Gender Service for Children
- Author: Hannah Barnes
- Audio read by: Hannah Barnes
- Language: English
- Subject: Transgender health care
- Publisher: Swift Press
- Publication date: 23 February 2023
- Publication place: United Kingdom
- Media type: Hardcover; Ebook; Audiobook
- Pages: 464
- ISBN: 9781800751118
- OCLC: 1356002081

Time to Think: The Inside Story of the Collapse of the Tavistock's Gender Service for Children is a 2023 nonfiction book by then BBC Newsnight investigative journalist Hannah Barnes. The book is about the NHS Gender Identity Development Service (GIDS) based at the Tavistock and Portman NHS Foundation Trust. Barnes said, "I wanted to write a definitive record of what happened [at GIDS] because there needs to be one."

Time to Think received positive reviews from critics, who commended Barnes's journalism. In 2023 it was short listed for both the Orwell Prize and the Baillie Gifford Prize.

== Overview ==
The book is centred around more than 100 hours of interviews Barnes conducted with close to 60 former clinicians who worked at GIDS. All but two of the interviews were taken before the decision was made to close GIDS.

Time to Think traces the history of GIDS from its foundation in 1989, covering the evolving nature of their services, the usage of puberty blockers, the influence of charities and support groups Mermaids, GIRES (Gender Identity Research and Education Society), and Gendered Intelligence, and the limited collaboration with CAMHS.

It traces various reports made by clinicians raising concerns: the David Taylor review (2005), David Bell report (2018), Dinesh Sinha's GIDS review (2019), Helen Roberts report (2021), and Hilary Cass review (2022).

The history is interspersed with accounts of seven young people who were treated by the service: Ellie (1994), Phoebe (2009), Jack (2011), Alex, Hannah, Jacob, and Harriet.

== Summary ==
Domenico Di Ceglie set up the Gender Identity Development Clinic for children and adolescents within the Department of Child Psychiatry at St George's Hospital in September 1989. In 1994 the clinic moved to the Portman Clinic and became part of the Tavistock and Portman NHS Foundation Trust. At the beginning the work was largely therapy-based. Di Ceglie said of the outcomes at the time, around 5% "commit themselves to a change of gender" and 60% to 70% grew up homosexual. In 2000 there was a retrospective audit led by David Freeman, looking at the records of 124 patients the service had seen since opening. The audit found that a majority of patients did not go on to transition, and that they could not predict which patients would be which. The audit showed it was very rare (2.5% of the sample) for young people referred to GIDS to have no associated problems. 70% had more than 5 "associated features". Common problems were associated with relationships, family, and mood.

St George's
Tavistock
Dr Domenico Di Ceglie
Dr Polly Carmichael
│
1989
│
1992
│
1995
│
1998
│
2001
│
2004
│
2007
│
2010
│
2013
│
2016
│
2019
│
2022
GIDS timeline

== Reception ==
Barnes's book has generally received praise. Camilla Cavendish of the Financial Times described it as a "meticulously researched, sensitive and cautionary chronicle" and a "powerful and disturbing book" that reminded them of other NHS scandals. Rachel Cooke, writing in The Observer called her work "scrupulous and fair-minded" and, with regard to GIDS, "far more disturbing than anything I've read before". Cooke says the account is of a "medical scandal" and "isn't a culture war story", concluding: "This is what journalism is for." Paul Cullen, of The Irish Times calls the book "forensic and sombre" and "scrupulously non-judgemental". Cordelia Fine describes the book as an "exhaustively researched account" of "a textbook organizational scandal". Fine notes that Barnes "repeatedly relays clinicians' support for young people's access to a medical pathway [and] offers no grist for prejudice-fuelled mills." Fine explains what she regards as "[s]ocially just medicine" and says "Barnes's book is replete with examples of how far short the gender service fell from this ideal."

Katy Hayes of the Irish Independent called the book "meticulously academic, thoroughly footnoted and referenced", though it is "a dense, clotted read". Hayes notes that interviews were "almost exclusively" with former GIDS employees who "dissented" from the direction the leadership took. Therefore, while "Barnes has her well-argued position, and the questions she raises are legitimate", "the result makes the book feel very one-sided. All the clinicians talk about how they harmed children. There is very little mention of how any clinician might have ever helped anyone." Hayes complains that the "book occasionally slides into innuendo" (such as about funding), which Hayes says is "a pity, because they make Barnes sound biased", and that "the overall tone of the book is so hostile that it is likely to become another weapon in the unfortunately loud and bitter war over this subject."

Will Lloyd of the New Statesman called it "as scrupulous as journalism can be" and noted "[t]hough pundits will use it as fuel for columns, Time to Think is no anti-trans polemic". Hannah Milton of BJGP Life explains that Barnes's approach to writing the book was "very rigorous" and that Barnes "comes across as a compassionate writer" who was objective, "fair and balanced". However, reading the "fastidiously documented" book was "heavy going at times" and ultimately "doesn't give any answers about how a gender service should be run". Suzanne Moore from The Daily Telegraph called it "well-researched" and notes that "Barnes is not coming at this from an ideological viewpoint." Janice Turner of The Times said it was a "sober, rhetoric-free and meticulously researched" account.

=== Awards ===
Year	Award	Category	Result	Ref
2023	Orwell Prize	Political Writing	Shortlisted	
2023	Baillie Gifford Prize		Shortlisted	

Barnes also wrote an article in the New Statesman entitled "The Cass Review into children’s gender care should shame us all / How children’s gender care went so wrong" which won 'Outstanding Contribution to Health and Medical Journalism' at the 2024 Medical Journalists' Association Awards.

== See also ==
- Cass Review
- Irreversible Damage, a 2020 book by Abigail Shrier
- Material Girls: Why Reality Matters for Feminism, a 2021 book by Kathleen Stock
- Trans: When Ideology Meets Reality, a 2021 book by Helen Joyce
