= Trans: When Ideology Meets Reality =

2021 book by Helen Joyce

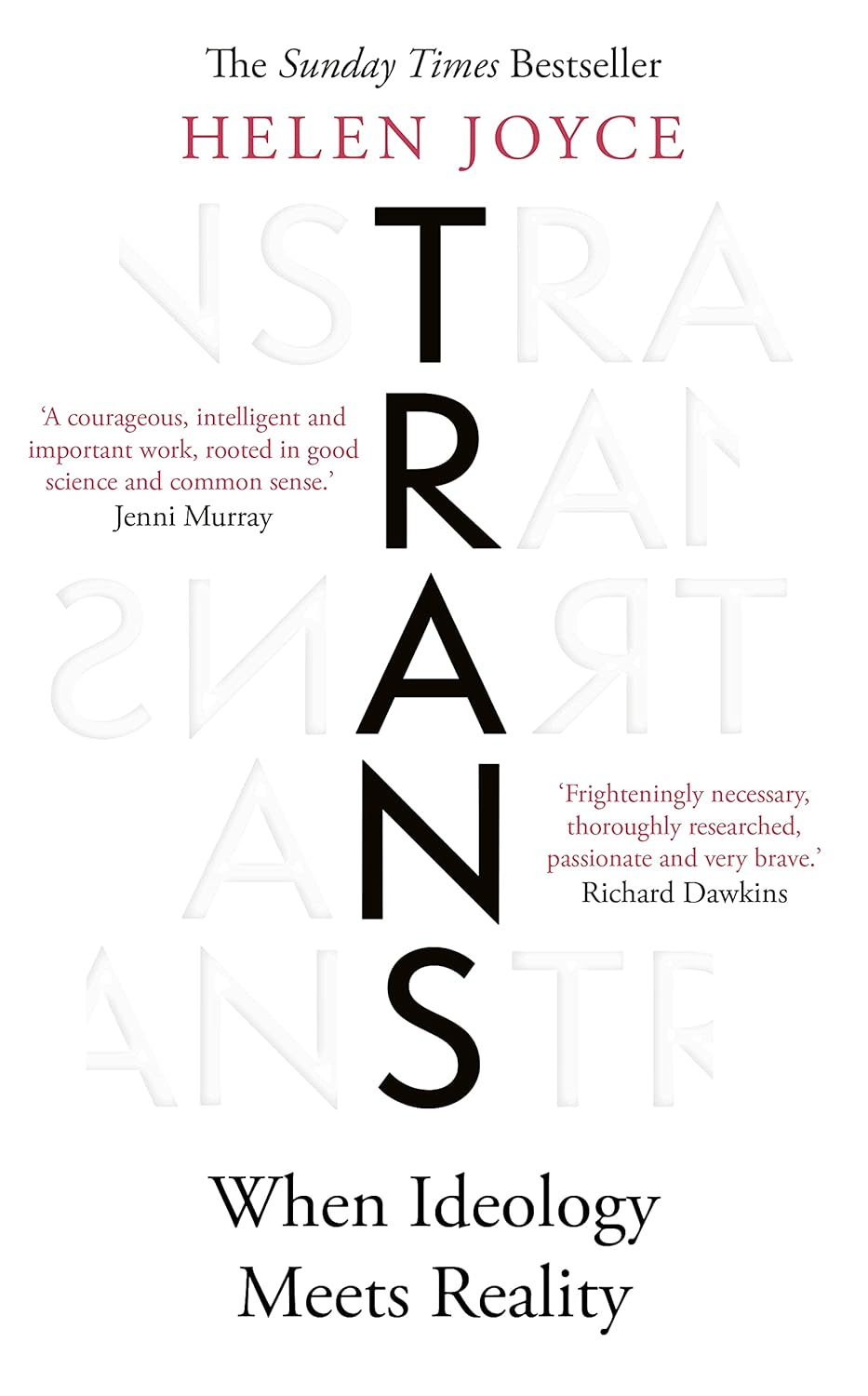
- Author: Helen Joyce
- Audio read by: Helen Joyce
- Language: English
- Subject: Gender studies
- Publisher: Oneworld Publications, Simon & Schuster
- Publication date: July 2021
- Publication place: United Kingdom
- Media type: Print (hardcover and paperback (May 2022)); Ebook; Audiobook
- ISBN: 978-0-86154-049-5
- OCLC: 1236260329
- Website: Trans, Oneworld Publication

Trans: When Ideology Meets Reality also printed as Trans: Gender Identity and the New Battle for Women's Rights or simply Trans is a 2021 non-fiction book by journalist and gender-critical activist Helen Joyce that criticises the transgender rights movement and transgender activism. It is published by Oneworld Publications, their fifth book in The Sunday Times bestseller list. Reviews of the book ranged from positive (The Times, The Telegraph) to negative (The Guardian, Publishers Weekly). The book has faced criticism from the LGBTQIA+ community, where it has been described as promoting transgender health care misinformation.

== Summary ==
Joyce writes that the book is about the idea "that people should count as men or women according to how they feel and what they declare, instead of their biology", describes this as gender identity replacing sex, and says this has "far-reaching consequences". Joyce states the book is not about transgender people, but about the lobbying of trans activism.

She begins by recounting a history of transgender identity. She describes the gender transitions of Lili Elbe and Christine Jorgensen, as well as influential researchers Magnus Hirschfeld, Harry Benjamin, and John Money, stating that these researchers all had unscientific beliefs about the nature of sex. She next discusses Blanchard's typology, in which trans women are classified into androphilic and autogynephilic types, and Anne Lawrence's research into the accounts of other self-identified autogynephiles. She next discusses the popularization of this research in The Man Who Would Be Queen, and the ensuing controversy. While agreeing with the existence of gender dysphoria, she criticizes the concept of gender identity, calling it a "sexed soul" and a form of mind–body dualism, and criticizes activists that state that being male or female has nothing to do with the physical body. She states that the concept is intellectually rooted in postmodernist philosophy, and gives rebuttals to arguments that sex is too complicated or socially constructed to be useful.

She next relates various academic debates around the treatment of gender dysphoria in children. She criticizes the "gender affirmative" approach, argues against Social transition, puberty blockers, and gender-affirming hormone therapy, and defended Kenneth Zucker and his recommendation pre-pubertal children avoid social transition and be "instead supported to become comfortable in their own sex". She endorses the concept of rapid-onset gender dysphoria, and compares it to past psychological social contagions and to culture-bound syndromes. She also relates the experiences of several detransitioners. She criticizes educational materials for children as equating non-conformity to gender stereotypes with being trans. She also argues that, as happened in the 1970s, activists are being careless about the safeguarding of children from sexual abuse.

She argues that most feminism has become disconnected from issues related to female embodiment, and has become unable to even name them. She criticizes the asymmetry between how gender and race are viewed, and argues that lesbians have come under particular pressure to accept unwanted sexual partners. She relates the legal cases of Jessica Yaniv, and argues they illustrate the weaknesses of gender self-identification policies. She states that single-sex spaces like changing rooms, domestic violence shelters, and prisons are now such in name only, and that this has led to adverse consequences. She relates various controversies and research related to transgender people in sports.

She discusses the recent history of transgender activism in the United States, and makes a case for why the political left there has become an especially strong proponent of it. She argues that gender self-identification in law infringes on the rights of others and has often been put into place without the general public knowing what is happening or supporting the consequences. She says it has been supported by billionaires and that there is a potential for conflicts of interest between researchers and those who profit from gender medicine. She criticizes many journalists, social media sites, universities, and other organizations as captured by transgender activism. She discusses recent successful resistance in the UK to gender self-identification, as well as Maya Forstater's legal case and the founding of the LGB Alliance. She makes a case for why a "secular, feminist resistance" appeared in the UK rather than somewhere else.

She argues that gender self-identification will not grow to widespread acceptance as same-sex marriage did, and suggests that preference falsification and pluralistic ignorance may be currently at play. She makes suggestions for how to recognize sex when it matters and also accommodate transgender people. She concludes by calling for more negotiation, for more listening, and a recommitment to freedom of belief and of speech.

== Reception ==
According to The Telegraph, Joyce is often described as a gender-critical feminist and has met some controversy over the presentation of ideas in the book. The Telegraph further said that in 2022, a lecture by Joyce at the University of Cambridge was boycotted by several professors concerned about some of Joyce's positions, including a college master who described the views expressed in Joyce's book as "offensive, insulting and hateful to members of our community who live and work here". The boycott was protested by alumni and donors who threatened to pull their donations and said they would not donate any further without a formal apology. According to The Telegraph, the event was not cancelled and went on as planned in November 2022.

Writing in Political Communication, Thomas J Billard said the book promoted transgender health care misinformation.

In an opinion piece in The Times titled "Trans purity test has lost touch with reality", author Lionel Shriver said that Helen Joyce told her she expected a "rough ride" when planning the book, and said that she was told Joyce met with some reluctance when selling the book.

=== Reviews ===
In The Times, David Aaronovitch wrote that Joyce examines "a new ideology about gender". He commended the book for "its intellectual clarity and its refusal to compromise", and stated Joyce "takes apart this ideology of gender with a cold rigour".

In The Telegraph, Kathleen Stock, professor of philosophy at the University of Sussex, and author of Material Girls: Why Reality Matters for Feminism, gave the book 5 out of 5 stars. She called it a "superlative critical analysis of trans activism" and said that "Joyce shows an impressive capacity to handle complex statistics, legal statutes, and other bits of evidence without losing clarity or narrative drive." She states that Joyce "deals with the philosophical contradictions of gender identity ideology briskly but efficiently", and that she describes harm being brought "on children, women, gay people, autistic people, and on trans people themselves".

In The Guardian, Gaby Hinsliff reviewed it alongside Material Girls. Hinsliff comments on the thesis defended by Joyce's book, mentioning it has seen some anecdotal support, but spends most of the review criticizing "some curious holes" present in the work. For Hinsliff, the book spends too much time on "contentious speculation about what makes people trans" instead of focusing on presenting the point of view from "policymakers, activists, the ordinary trans people [Joyce] considers misrepresented". Hinsliff also argues that Joyce's refusal to acknowledge the "fundamental conflicts" between many trans women fearing violence in men's changing rooms and some women feeling less safe in their presence "precludes finding solutions". She considered Material Girls to handle the topic better.

Stella O'Malley reviewed the book in the Evening Standard, praising its writing style, and stating that Joyce "goes through every issue related to trans activism and, painstakingly, piece by piece, she takes a scalpel to it". She calls the book a must-read for those who want "to gain a deep understanding of the issues related to trans activism".

In the New Statesman, Louise Perry discusses both Trans and Material Girls, calling them "incisive, compassionate and nuanced". She states that Trans "provides a political account of the points of contention between the trans movement and feminists". She suggests that the success of both books indicates an upwards "respectability cascade" for gender-critical feminism. In the same publication, Sophie McBain gave a comparative review of The Transgender Issue and Trans, a contrast present in many reviews of the former, concluding that "if you find yourself nodding in agreement with Helen Joyce, I can only recommend that the next writer you read is Shon Faye".

In The Scotsman, Susan Dalgety recommended the book and called it a "searing analysis of the transgender debate".

Publishers Weekly criticized the book as "alarmist" and a "one-sided takedown" that comes up short. The review argued that Joyce did not speak to people who have happily transitioned and that she does not present statistics about how few people regret their surgical and hormonal treatments.

In reviewing Trans for The New York Times, journalist Jesse Singal called it an "intelligent, thorough rejoinder to an idea that has swept across much of the liberal world seemingly overnight". He also states that "here and there, I found myself wishing for a bit more nuance", pointing to an instance of not accurately rendering opponents' arguments, calling its narrative of radical activists having nearly routed sober-minded scientists "a bit too tidy", and saying it is "very thin on citations". Nevertheless, he concludes that Trans "is a compelling, overdue argument for viewing self-ID more critically".

For Critical Legal Thinking, law professor Alex Sharpe described the book as 'zealous' in contrast to Stock's 'forensic' approach in Material Girls, and went on to argue that "it is poorly referenced, contains a great deal of anecdote, draws conclusions barely supported by evidence, fails to weigh evidence properly, or to consider fully or at all counter evidence even where such evidence accords with medical or other consensus". Sharpe goes on to take issue with a number of points Joyce raises, including the link between autogynephilia and transsexuality; the proportion of children experiencing gender dysphoria who go on to become trans adults, where she argues Joyce has confused gender noncomformity with gender dysphoria; Joyce's reference to the controversial theory of rapid onset gender dysphoria; and Joyce's claims that 'a few wealthy people', including George Soros, influence the global agenda with regards to trans rights.

Aaron Rabinowitz, writing for The Skeptic, criticised Joyce for her repeating activist Jennifer Bilek's claims that a cabal of Jewish billionaires fund the transgender rights movement through contributions to organisations such as Planned Parenthood and the American Civil Liberties Union. Joyce published a rebuttal to these allegations in which Joyce denied plagiarism, denounced Bilek for antisemitism and reiterated the thesis of her book. She also corrected a claim about a donation made by Open Society Foundation; the donation was to a similarly named group which also advocated for gender self-identification.

=== Sales ===
The book debuted at number 7 on The Sunday Times list of bestselling general hardbacks.

=== Awards ===
Year	Award	Result	Ref
2023	John Maddox Prize	Shortlisted	

== See also ==
- Feminist views on transgender topics
- Irreversible Damage, a 2020 book by Abigail Shrier
- Material Girls: Why Reality Matters for Feminism, a 2021 book by Kathleen Stock
- Time to Think, a 2023 book by Hannah Barnes
