= Irreversible Damage =

2020 book by Abigail Shrier

Irreversible Damage: The Transgender Craze Seducing Our Daughters
- Cover of the first edition
- Author: Abigail Shrier
- Language: English
- Publisher: Regnery Publishing
- Publication date: June 30, 2020
- Publication place: United States
- Media type: Print and digital
- ISBN: 978-1-68451-031-3

Irreversible Damage: The Transgender Craze Seducing Our Daughters is a 2020 book by Abigail Shrier, published by Regnery Publishing. The book endorses the unvalidated hypothesis of rapid-onset gender dysphoria (ROGD), which posits that increases in adolescents and young adults identifying as transgender is due to peer influence or social contagion. In the book, Shrier criticizes gender-affirming psychiatric support, hormone replacement therapy and gender affirming surgery (together often referred to as "gender-affirming care") as treatments for gender dysphoria in young people. The ROGD hypothesis is not recognised as a medical diagnosis by any major professional institution.

The book has received mixed responses. Several positive reviews were published endorsing Shrier's claims about trans people, and the book was also criticized for repeating anti-trans medical misinformation. Several retailers refused to sell the book in response to these criticisms.

== Summary ==
Shrier states that she began to investigate adolescent-onset gender dysphoria after being contacted by the mother of a young adult with no apparent history of childhood gender dysphoria, who identified as transgender in college. She describes what she sees as difficulties facing teenagers who were assigned female at birth, whom she refers to as "biological girls": isolation, online social dynamics, restrictive gender and sexuality labels, unwelcome physical changes and sexual attention. She profiles several teenagers who questioned their gender identities or came out as transgender while experiencing mental health or personal issues. She discusses Lisa Littman's 2018 journal article on rapid onset gender dysphoria and the ensuing controversy and endorses Littman's findings. She states that online trans influencers, on websites like Twitter, Tumblr and TikTok, frequently encourage questioning youth to identify as trans, experiment with breast binding and testosterone, and disown or lie to unsupportive family members.

Shrier criticizes transgender-related curricula and policies in schools. She describes parents distressed by their children's transgender identification or transition. She critiques the gender-affirming model of care and profiles its critics: Kenneth Zucker, Ray Blanchard, J. Michael Bailey, Lisa Marchiano, and Paul R. McHugh. Shrier discusses trans activism and related controversies, including sex-specific privacy concerns; passing versus trans visibility; the role of celebrities in increasing trans acceptance; conflict between transgender people and lesbians or radical feminists; transfeminine/male-to-female athletes competing in girls' and women's sports; the use of trans-inclusive language; intersectionality; and identity politics. She argues that medical interventions such as puberty blockers, cross-sex hormones, and surgeries include risks. As an example, she describes a transgender person who became disabled after a failed surgery. She also profiles detransitioned young women.

== Background and publication history ==
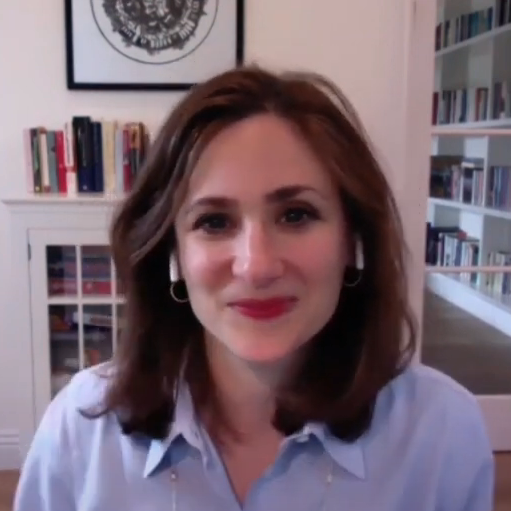
Shrier in an interview in 2020

Shrier attended Columbia and Oxford University and earned a J.D. at Yale Law School.

The contentious concept of rapid-onset gender dysphoria (ROGD), which Irreversible Damage endorses, was first proposed in a 2018 paper by Lisa Littman. ROGD is not recognized as a medical diagnosis by any major professional institution and is not backed by credible scientific evidence.

Irreversible Damage was first published in June 2020 by Regnery Publishing, a conservative publisher. An audiobook narrated by Pamela Almand was released by Blackstone Audio. In the UK, the book was published by Swift Press, with the subtitle "Teenage Girls and the Transgender Craze". In a July 2020 interview on The Joe Rogan Experience, Shrier called the desire to transition a "contagion" and compared it with eating disorders and self-harm. She associated transgender youth with autism. Her remarks sparked calls by Spotify employees for the Rogan podcast episode to be removed from the platform, but the company denied the request.

Chase Ross, a transgender YouTuber interviewed by Shrier for Irreversible Damage, apologized in 2021 for his participation in the book, claiming he was misled about the book's contents and the author's intent.

== Marketing and distribution ==
In June 2020, Amazon suspended a paid advertising campaign for the book one week prior to publication. Amazon stated this was because the book "infers or claims to diagnose, treat, or question sexual orientation." In April 2021, employees petitioned Amazon to stop selling the book; a company official responded that the book did not violate Amazon's content policies and the company would continue to offer it. In March 2022, a group called No Hate at Amazon circulated a petition demanding that Amazon stop selling Irreversible Damage and Johnny the Walrus and demanded that Amazon set up an oversight board that would allow employees to democratically determine what content can be sold on Amazon. At least 500 people signed the petition, which was presented to Amazon leadership in mid-2021. Some employees left Amazon over the company's refusal to stop selling Irreversible Damage and Johnny the Walrus.

In November 2020, Target briefly stopped selling the book following criticism online, but made it available for purchase again a day later. Several LGBT commentators expressed support for the book's removal. The Daily Dot columnist Ana Valens wrote that it contained obvious transphobia and encouraged conversion therapy. In Them, the writer James Factora stated that almost every claim in the publisher's description of the book was a "blatant lie". In Gay City News, the journalist Matt Tracy criticized Shrier for misgendering subjects. Shrier had stated, "I refer to biologically female teens caught up in this transgender craze as 'she' and 'her'", which Tracy wrote is "a choice by the author that disrespects transgender teens' gender identity and falsely assumes that all trans boys or non-binary individuals assigned female at birth have the same biological makeup." In February 2021, Target again withdrew the book from sale.

In April 2021, a petition was launched to have the Halifax Public Library system remove their two copies of the book from circulation. The library refused, citing intellectual freedom and stating that removal would constitute censorship. Following this, Halifax Pride announced it would no longer hold events at any Halifax library locations.

In July 2021, the American Booksellers Association, a non-profit trade association that promotes independent bookstores, issued an apology for including the book in a monthly mailing, calling the decision to do so a "serious, violent incident" and characterizing the book as "anti-trans". This set off further controversy, with some arguing the association was now trying to censor the book, and others saying the apology was insufficient.

Chase Strangio, an attorney for the American Civil Liberties Union (ACLU), tweeted that "stopping the circulation of this book and these ideas is 100% a hill I will die on." Strangio later deleted the tweet, saying he was not calling for a government ban but "to create the information climate for the market to be more supportive of trans self-determination".

The book has been translated into multiple languages and foreign-language versions have been released in other countries such as Spain, France, Hungary and Israel where a speech by Shrier drew protesters.

Backlashes against the book have led to termination of its publication in Japan.

== Reception ==
Responses to the book have been divided. It was positively reviewed by Nick Cater in The Spectator Australia, by The Economist, by Emily Hourican in the Irish Independent, by Madeleine Kearns in the National Review, by Christina Patterson in The Sunday Times, by Naomi Schaefer Riley in Commentary, and by Janice Turner in The Times of London. It received mixed reviews from the theologian Tina Beattie in The Tablet and the psychologist Christopher Ferguson in a Psychology Today blogpost. It was negatively reviewed by Sarah Fonseca in the Los Angeles Review of Books and by Jack Turban, a fellow in psychiatry and researcher in transgender mental health, in a Psychology Today blogpost. Science-Based Medicine retracted a positive review by their co-editor the physician Harriet Hall and subsequently published a series of articles criticizing the book. Hall published a revised review on her own website describing it as "An important book that is flawed but raises serious questions".

The Economist included Irreversible Damage among its books of the year for 2020. The Economist called the book "one of the first accessible treatments of a subject that has generated much fascinated coverage" but remarked it had not received many reviews in mainstream papers. It credited Shrier with "[telling] the stories of those she interviews with great care", but suggested that she might have overstated the extent to which teenagers were receiving medical interventions. Madeleine Kearns reviewed Irreversible Damage alongside Debra W. Soh's The End of Gender. She stated that Shrier's book provided "a personal, inquisitive, and often moving narrative". Naomi Schaefer Riley wrote that Shrier was correct to ask "what's ailing" adolescents who appeared to suddenly begin identifying as transgender. She endorsed Shrier's criticisms of transgender healthcare and online transgender activism. Janice Turner called the book "fearless", remarking on the controversy surrounding it and endorsing its conclusions.

Tina Beattie called the book "a disturbing, infuriating and compelling study". She criticized Shrier's use of anecdotes from parents or professionals, apparently unbeknownst to the subjects themselves. She wrote that, while "many of Shrier's claims may be open to challenge", the reported increase in cases of adolescent-onset dysphoria "should be a cause for much greater caution and disquiet than is currently the case". Christopher Ferguson wrote that Shrier had "some valid ideas" and that he was "not willing to dismiss her thesis entirely", but also that she failed to "carefully hew" to science and that "high-quality, preregistered, open science, scientific efforts" were needed in the area.

Sarah Fonseca condemned the book for its presentation, substance, and sourcing. Historian Ben Miller compared the cover's design, "with the little white girl's reproductive organs obliterated by a black hole," to that of Nazi propaganda posters. Psychiatrist Jack Turban accused Shrier of promoting the denial of gender-affirming medical care from transgender youth, which he called a fringe position rejected by several professional societies. He also accused Shrier of misinterpreting and omitting scientific evidence to support her book's claims and criticized her for portraying transgender youth based on interviews with parents, and for "crass and offensive language."

Skeptic and physician Harriet Hall published a positive review of the book on the website Science-Based Medicine in June 2021, stating that Shrier "brings up some alarming facts that desperately need to be looked into", that care centered on gender affirmation "is a mistake and a dereliction of duty", and that the current political climate has made scientific study of these matters nearly impossible. The site's two other editors, Steven Novella and David Gorski, retracted the review which was republished in Skeptic. Hall said this was the first time an SBM article had been retracted in the site's 14-year history. Novella and Gorski later explained the retraction, concluding that both Hall's and Shrier's claims are "not supported by any evidence and [are] cobbled together with a gross misreading of the scientific evidence", and are based on "anecdotes, outliers, political discussions, and cherry-picked science". In the following weeks, the site published a series of articles about the book by guest authors and physicians Rose Lovell and AJ Eckert that also criticized the book for scientific errors, cherry-picked data, and misinformation.

== See also ==
- Material Girls: Why Reality Matters for Feminism, a 2021 book by Kathleen Stock
- Time to Think, a 2023 book by Hannah Barnes
- Trans: When Ideology Meets Reality, a 2021 book by Helen Joyce
