= Travis Alabanza =

British performance artist, writer and dramatist

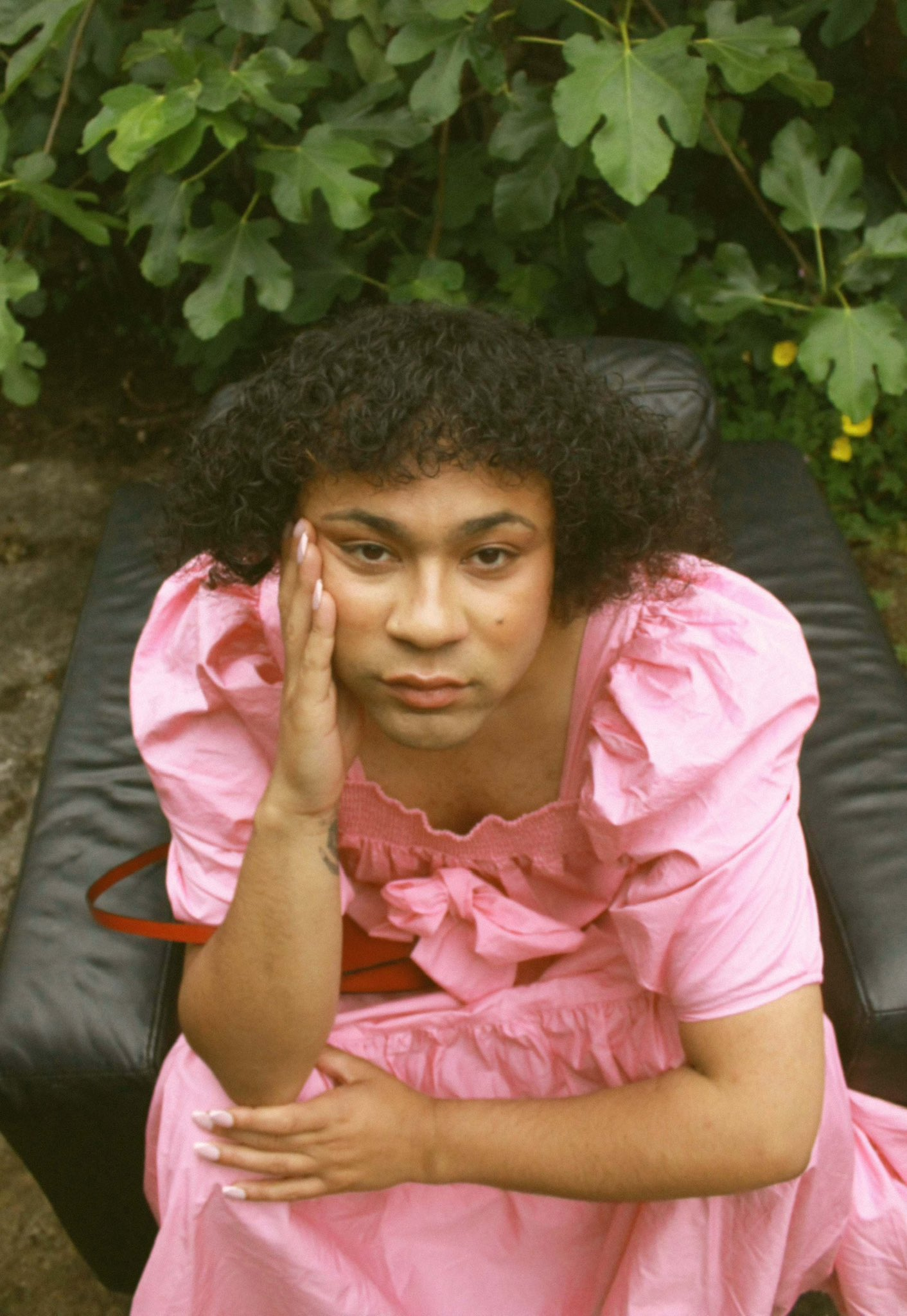
- Alabanza in 2023
- Born: 15 November 1995 (age 30); Bristol, England, United Kingdom
- Awards: Jhalak Prize, 2023
- Website: travisalabanza.co.uk

Travis Alabanza (born 15 November 1995) is an English performance artist, writer and dramatist.

== Career ==
Alabanza started their career in London with spoken word performances; their poems were first published in 2015 in the Black and Gay in the UK Anthology and they were named a Barbican Young Poet. Later that year, Alabanza toured in Stories of a Queer Brown Muddy Kid, performing at clubs, bookstores, and performance venues.

They have lectured on race and sexual orientation at universities in the United Kingdom during LGBTQ and Black History month. In 2017/2018, they became the youngest person ever to be awarded a residency at The Tate.

In 2016, Alabanza appeared in a production of Putting Words in Your Mouth by Scottee. In 2017, they worked on a solo exhibition, The Other'd Artist for Transmission Gallery in Glasgow, Scotland. Alabanza released their first chapbook titled Before I Step Outside. (You Love Me); a compilation of visual art, poetry, diary entries, and essays. They also performed the leading role in the stage adaptation of Derek Jarman's punk film Jubilee.

In 2018, Alabanza created Burgerz. This solo audience participation show concerns an incident of harassment in 2016 in which a person threw a burger at Alabanza on a bridge in London. The show toured from October 19 to November 17, 2018. It was performed in Australia in 2023 with another performer.

In 2019, Alabanza and a friend collaborated on an immersive installation titled All the Ways We Could Grow for the Free Word Centre, London, which explores the question: "What's it like to be trans?". In 2020, during the first COVID-19 lockdown in England, Alabanza and Danielle Brathwaite-Shirley gave a live-streamed performance for the Free Word Centre of If I Feel Lonely Maybe U Do 2?. Overflow, written by Alabanza, directed by Debbie Hannan, and starring Reece Lyons, was produced by the Bush Theatre in London in 2020 and 2021. It later had an Australian version starring Janet Anderson, at Darlinghurst Theatre. The play is about trans safety.

In 2022, Alabanza released a semi-autobiographical non-fiction book None of the Above: My Life Beyond the Binary. The book was listed as a Waterstones Best Book of 2022: Politics and won the 2023 Jhalak Prize. In 2023, Alabanza and Hannan co-created Sound of the Underground at the Royal Court Theatre. The play featured drag performers from London.

== Personal life ==
Alabanza was born in Bristol and grew up on a council estate. They started writing poetry at 16 years old. After having the burger thrown at them, they decided to make their works public.

Alabanza is Black, transfeminine, and gender non-conforming, and uses the pronouns they/them. Alabanza speaks out about trans rights and the importance of safe spaces and communities for gender non-conforming and transgender people. Shon Faye, in her 2021 book The Transgender Issue: An Argument for Justice, quotes Alabanza: "When I say trans, I also mean escape. I mean choice. I mean autonomy. I mean wanting something greater than what you told me. Wanting more possibilities than the one you forced on me."

In November 2017, Alabanza was denied access to a female dressing room while shopping at Topshop in Manchester, the fashion retailer owned at the time by Sir Philip Green's Arcadia Group. On social media, Alabanza accused Topshop of violating their own policy to allow trans individuals to use the dressing rooms associated with their preferred gender. The Times published an opinion piece by Janice Turner, implying that Topshop's policy was changed because of Alabanza's tweet and claiming the policy would lead to child abuse. Subsequently, Alabanza received online death threats over Topshop's policy.

== Works ==
Title	Publisher	Date published	Type of work
"The Sea"	OUTspoken	April 2017	Poem
Queer and Now	The Tate	June 2017	Performance
Before I Step Outside. (You Love Me)		July 2017	Chapbook of poetry, essays, photos
"Who is Allowed to be a Victim?"	TEDxBrum	October 2017	Performance/TEDx Talk
"TRANZ TALKZ"	Hackney Showroom	October 2018	Dinner & Performance
BURGERZ	Arts Council England	October 2018	Interactive Performance
"The Heel of Marsha"	Gay Times	October 2018	Poem
All the Ways We Could Grow (collaboration with Denny Kaulbach)	London's Free Word Centre	February 2019	Immersive bedroom installation
My Stubble Has No Gender (collaboration with Denny Kaulbach)			Print
If I Feel Lonely Maybe U Do 2? (with Danielle Brathwaite-Shirley)	Free Word Centre	9 April 2020	Live-streamed performance
Overflow	Bush Theatre	2020–2021	Play
Sound of the Underground	Royal Court Theatre	2023	Play
