= The Prime Minister's Ironing Board and Other State Secrets =

2013 book by Adam Macqueen

The Prime Minister's Ironing Board and other State Secrets
- First edition
- Author: Adam Macqueen
- Cover artist: Mike Wykes
- Language: English
- Subject: Politics and history of the United Kingdom
- Published: London
- Publisher: Little, Brown
- Publication date: 2013
- Publication place: United Kingdom
- Pages: 286
- ISBN: 9780349138916
- Dewey Decimal: 941.085

The Prime Minister's Ironing Board and other State Secrets is a 2013 book by Adam Macqueen, produced with the assistance of the National Archives of the United Kingdom.

== Synopsis ==
The book reveals numerous notes, letters and other documents stamped 'secret' and filed away over the years. From concerned notes on Prince Charles' potential brainwashing by Welsh nationalist terrorists to worries about housemaids 'on the wobble' at Chequers, the book reveals serious matters to comical details of life in the corridors of power.

== Reception ==
In The Guardian Peter Preston described the book as 'the perfect bedside book...irresistibly, we're invited to look back and laugh' while in The Financial Times Charlotte McCann praised the book as 'delightfully gossipy' and noted that the author 'offers vignettes of British political life from the whimsical to the downright chilling'.

It was judged a Daily Telegraph Book of the Year. It was shortlisted for the Political Humour and Satire Book of the Year Award at the Paddy Power Political Book Awards 2014.
