= The Transgender Issue =

2021 non-fiction book by Shon Faye

The Transgender Issue: An Argument for Justice
- Front cover
- Author: Shon Faye
- Subject: Transgender liberation in the United Kingdom
- Publisher: Allen Lane
- Publication date: 2 September 2021
- ISBN: 9780241423141

The Transgender Issue: An Argument for Justice is a 2021 non-fiction book by Shon Faye on the subject of transgender liberation in the United Kingdom. Faye explores how issues of social class, employment and housing insecurity, police violence and prisons, and sex work affect transgender people. She makes an argument for how transgender liberation would improve society more widely. Faye, a professional journalist, wrote the book largely in the first English COVID-19 pandemic lockdown. She drew from Revolting Prostitutes and Why I'm No Longer Talking to White People About Race in her writing, while reviews frequently contrasted it with Helen Joyce's Trans: When Ideology Meets Reality, which was published in the same year. It became a bestseller in The Sunday Times.

== Background ==
Shon Faye is an English journalist who started her career as a lawyer. Her first public reporting as a transgender person was video journalism for Novara Media in 2016 and 2017. She later became editor-at-large for the magazine Dazed. The Transgender Issue was Faye's first book; it was released on 2 September 2021 by Allen Lane.

In her book proposal, Faye mentioned the 2010s British books Revolting Prostitutes, about sex work decriminalisation, and Why I'm No Longer Talking to White People About Race, about gender, race and class. She considered The Transgender Issue to be "in conversation with both of those books". She did not want to write a memoir, to distinguish the book from other transgender literature, and chose to include "professional anecdotes rather than personal experiences", in a similar manner to the authors of those books. Faye was reluctant to write The Transgender Issue, fearing that it would be met with apathy or hostility. She hoped that it would be "a long-standing text".

Though the project took around three years, the book was largely written during the first English lockdown in the COVID-19 pandemic: Faye weighted more left-wing perspectives towards the end of the book, as they seemed to fit with the contemporary mood, including a resurgence of the Black Lives Matter movement and pandemic-related concerns over furlough, homelessness and decarceration. Having previously seen left-wing arguments casting transgender identity as identity politics or a right-wing cause, Faye wanted to make a left-wing argument for transgender liberation, as well as to demonstrate that "if you improve the conditions for minorities, you make society better as a whole".

According to PinkNews, the book was published in a context of increasing anti-transgender views in mainstream media, politics, sports and women's spaces. Faye said that public discourse centred cisgender anxieties rather than the reality of transgender life. Their framing of the topic as "the transgender issue", a term which Faye disliked, gave the book its name. Her aim was to cover issues that materially affect transgender people, rather than anti-transgender ideologies and its high-profile proponents such as Graham Linehan. For instance, the second chapter is about transgender healthcare in the United Kingdom. Faye aimed to make the topic "legible to" cisgender people, so that they could be "invested in" it. In the book, Faye favours the term transgender liberation over transgender rights, saying that it relates to her view that "you wouldn't want to be an equal within a society that's already corrupted".

When asked about her next project after The Transgender Issue, Faye expressed interest in more personal writing, television writing or more comedic writing.

== Synopsis ==
An epigraph quotes Travis Alabanza on the word trans and its meanings outside of an abbreviation for transgender.

Faye argues that the British media, including newspapers and television news, are hostile to trans people. She frames the transgender liberation movement within a broader context of social and economic activism. The book covers a range of issues through the lens of how they affect transgender and non-binary people, including: bodily autonomy and sexual liberation; class discrimination; healthcare; sex work; job and housing insecurity; and police violence, prisons and treatment of asylum seekers.

== Reception ==
The Transgender Issue entered The Sunday Times's bestseller list in the week of its publication, in fifth place, falling to seventh and tenth place in the next two weeks. The book also topped the list of Penguin Press bestsellers, surpassing Jordan Peterson's Beyond Order. This book was translated into Japanese by Yutori Takai in 2022.

Several reviews contrasted the book with Helen Joyce's Trans: When Ideology Meets Reality and Kathleen Stock's Material Girls, both published the same year. Sophie McBain of the New Statesman gave a comparative review of The Transgender Issue and Trans, concluding that "if you find yourself nodding in agreement with Helen Joyce, I can only recommend that the next writer you read is Shon Faye". McBain praised The Transgender Issue as "a bracing and vital corrective to mainstream writing on trans rights", but criticised "self-defeating" political positions such as opposition of increased police diversity. She believed that an exploration of how to prevent male violence would have improved the book.

Christina Patterson of The Times, also making a comparative review, cast Faye's views as both "very radical" and commonly held in many places. Patterson praised her as a "highly intelligent" author who "writes with compassion and clarity about marginalised groups", but criticised that she "doesn't fully acknowledge" that some of her proposed ideas "clash with the rights of" cisgender women.

The philosopher Judith Butler endorsed the book, praising that it appropriately categorises arguments which should be engaged with and those which should not. Juliet Jacques of frieze praised its linking of transgender issues with individual autonomy in modern society and its coverage of transgender children and sex workers. The Guardian's Felix Moore was "profoundly grateful" for the book, lauding that Faye's analogies "deftly answer complicated questions" and "shatter the divide whereby trans people are seen as incomprehensible and separate from all other groups". Moore found the writing to be "uncompromising" and contain "palpable" anger. Fiona Sturges, also writing in The Guardian, said that the book "makes for sobering reading", and that her "reclaiming of the word 'issue' is significant". Sturges stated that the book was "measured in tone" and contained "a cool dismantling of the myths and falsehoods that continue to blight [trans people's] lives". Christine Burns described the book as "a seminal text, the kind you see only once in a generation".

A review by Stella O'Malley for the Evening Standard was positive towards the book's prose style, informational content and "clear and concise analysis of the presenting issues for trans people today", as well as its criticism of what Faye calls "hostile feminist analysis". However, O'Malley criticised incomplete exploration of transgender mental health, some "leaps of logic" and "shallow" argumentation, and said that the book intersperses "dependable peer-reviewed evidence with much more dubious sources such as online surveys".
