= David McKie =

British journalist and historian (born 1935)

David McKie (born 1935) is a British journalist and historian.

He was deputy editor of The Guardian and continued to write a weekly column for that paper until 4 October 2007, called "Elsewhere". Until 10 September 2005, he also wrote a second weekly column, under the pseudonym "Smallweed" (and occasionally under anagrams, such as "Dame Wells", and "Lee Laws MD"). He continues to contribute to the paper on an occasional basis, including a piece about his premature death being falsely reported in this article, and a 2021 letter defending The Guardian and editor Peter Preston in 1983 returning documents which led to the imprisonment of whistleblower Sarah Tisdall.

His book Jabez: The Rise and Fall of a Victorian Scoundrel, a biography of the Victorian era politician and swindler Jabez Balfour, was shortlisted for the Saga Award for Wit, also known as the Silver Booker, as well as the Whitbread Book Award for biography. Great British Bus Journeys was shortlisted for a Dolman Best Travel Book Award in 2007.

== Works ==
- Election '70, Panther (1970) ISBN 0-586033890
- The Decade of Disillusion: British Politics in the Sixties, Palgrave Macmillan (1972) ISBN 0-333130642
- Sadly Mismanaged Affair: Politics of the Third London Airport, Croom Helm (1973) ISBN 0-856640964
- The 'Guardian' – Quartet Election Guide, Quartet Books (1974) ISBN 0-704311895
- The Election: A Voter's Guide, Fourth Estate (1992) ISBN 1-857020413
- "Guardian" Political Almanac (1993) ISBN 1-857021576
- "The Guardian" Political Almanac 1994/5 (1994) ISBN 1-857022408
- Media Coverage of Parliament, Hansard Society for Parliamentary Government (1999) ISBN 0-900432500
- The "Guardian" Year, Atlantic Books (2002) ISBN 1-843540150
- Jabez: The Rise and Fall of a Victorian Scoundrel, Atlantic Books (2004) ISBN 978-1843541301
- Great British Bus Journeys: Travels Through Unfamous Places, Atlantic Books (2006) ISBN 978-1843541325
- McKie's Gazetteer: A Local History of Britain , Atlantic Books (2008) ISBN 978-1843546542
- Bright Particular Stars: A Gallery of Glorious British Eccentrics, Atlantic Books (2011) ISBN 978-1848872486
- What's in a Surname, Cornerstone (2013) ISBN 978-1847946942
- Riding Route 94: An Accidental Journey through the Story of Britain, Pimpernel Press (2017) ISBN 978-1910258347

Media offices
Preceded by John Cole	Deputy Editor of The Guardian; 1975 – 1984	Succeeded by Peter Cole
