= John Cole (journalist) =

British journalist and broadcaster (1927–2013)

- Born: John Morrison Cole; 23 November 1927; Belfast, Northern Ireland
- Died: 7 November 2013 (aged 85); Claygate, Surrey, England
- Occupations: Journalist; broadcaster
- Title: Political editor of BBC News (1981–1992)
- Spouse: Madge
- Children: 4

John Morrison Cole (23 November 1927 – 7 November 2013) was a Northern Irish journalist and broadcaster, best known for his work with the BBC. Cole served as deputy editor of The Guardian and The Observer and, from 1981 to 1992, was the BBC's political editor. Donald Macintyre, in an obituary in The Independent, described him as "the most recognisable and respected broadcast political journalist since World War II."

== Early life ==
Cole was born in Belfast, Northern Ireland, in 1927 to George Cole, an electrical engineer, and his wife Alice. The family were Ulster Protestants, and Cole identified himself as British. He received his formal education at the Belfast Royal Academy.

== Journalism career ==
=== Print journalism ===
Cole started his career in print journalism in 1945, aged 17, joining the Belfast Telegraph as a reporter and industrial correspondent. He subsequently worked as a political reporter for the paper. He gained a scoop when he interviewed the then Prime Minister, Clement Attlee, who was holidaying in Ireland.

He joined The Guardian, then the Manchester Guardian, in 1956, reporting on industrial issues. He transferred to the London office in 1957 as the paper's labour correspondent. Appointed news editor in 1963, succeeding Nesta Roberts, Cole took on the task of reorganising the paper's "amateurish" system for gathering news. He headed opposition to a proposed merger with The Times in the mid-1960s, and later served as deputy editor under Alastair Hetherington. When Hetherington left in 1975, Cole was in the running for the editorship, but failed to secure the post, for reasons which may have included his commitment to the cause of unionism in Northern Ireland, as well as what was seen by some as inflexibility and a lack of flair. Unwilling to continue at The Guardian, Cole then joined The Observer as deputy editor under Donald Trelford, remaining there for six years.

Peter Preston, who beat Cole to the editorship of The Guardian, describes him as "a great labour correspondent", "a driving news editor" and "a vivid presence" at the newspaper. Colleague David McKie wrote that one of his strengths was "to ask the awkward question that punctured glib assumptions and casual simplicities."

=== Television ===
After Tiny Rowland took over as proprietor of The Observer in 1981, Cole gave evidence against him at the Monopolies Commission. The following day he got a call from the BBC offering him the job of political editor, succeeding John Simpson. Cole commented on his switch from print to television journalism: "The invitation to have a ringside seat for what must be the most fascinating period in modern politics was irresistible." He had little previous television experience but proved a "natural broadcaster." Reporting through most of the premiership of Margaret Thatcher, he became a familiar figure on television and radio.

His health was put under strain by the workload and he suffered a heart attack in February 1984. Returning to report on that year's conference season, he covered the Brighton hotel bombing, getting a "memorable" interview with Thatcher on the pavement in its immediate aftermath, in which she declared that the Tory conference would take place as normal. An astute observer of the political scene, Cole was one of the earliest to forecast Thatcher's resignation as prime minister in 1990, in what McKie refers to as "perhaps his greatest exclusive." Donald Macintyre writes that he "did more than any single figure to create popular understanding of the turbulent 1980s".

Cole established a strong reputation for his "gentle but probing" interviewing style, for his political assessments, and for presenting analysis rather than "bland reporting." McKie considers him to have "revolutionised the routine broadcast reporting of politics", while Macintyre states that he "pioneered the best in modern political broadcast journalism." "Held in enormous affection by viewers," Cole was trusted by both politicians and the public. He was known for "speaking in the language used by ordinary people" rather than "so-called Westminster experts" and for "articulat[ing] the viewpoint of the ordinary man or woman in the street." His distinctive Northern Irish accent – lampooned by Private Eye and Spitting Image, who made a puppet representing him – led the way for BBC broadcasters with regional accents.

He retired as political editor in 1992 (aged 65), compulsory at that date, but continued to appear on television, including making programmes on golf and travel. He also continued to appear on the BBC programme Westminster Live for several years after he retired as political editor.

=== Writing ===
In addition to his journalistic writing, Cole authored several books. The earliest were The Poor of the Earth, on developing countries, and The Thatcher Years (1987). After his retirement as BBC political editor, he spent more time writing. His political memoir, As It Seemed To Me, appeared in 1995 and became a best-seller. He also published a novel, A Clouded Peace (2001), set in his birthplace of Belfast in 1977.

In 2007 he wrote an article for the British Journalism Review, blaming both politicians and the media for the fact that parliamentarians were held in such low esteem, being particularly scathing of Alastair Campbell's influence during Tony Blair's premiership.

== Awards ==
In 1966, the Eisenhower Fellowships selected Cole to represent Great Britain. He received the Royal Television Society's Journalist of the Year award in 1991. After his retirement in 1992, he was awarded an honorary degree from the Open University as Doctor of the University, and received the Richard Dimbleby Award from BAFTA in 1993. He turned down a CBE in 1993, citing the former Guardian newspaper rule that journalists could only accept gifts which could be consumed within 24 hours.

== Personal life ==
In his private life Cole was a supporter of the Labour Party, and was a believer in the trades union movement. He considered that the combating of unemployment was one of the most important political issues. He was a British Republican, and a committed Christian, associating in the latter part of his life with the United Reformed Church at Kingston upon Thames. He was described by colleague Peter Preston as "warm, generous and the kind of colleague we all wished to be."

He married Madge around 1956. The couple had four sons and nine grandchildren.

== Death ==
Cole suffered health problems in retirement including heart problems and two minor strokes. In 2009 he was diagnosed with cancer. He subsequently developed aphasia. Cole died at his home at Claygate in the county of Surrey on 7 November 2013.

== Tributes ==
Tributes were paid by journalists, broadcasters and politicians across the political spectrum. Prime Minister David Cameron called him a "titan at the BBC" and an "extraordinary broadcaster". Labour party leader Ed Miliband said that "my generation grew up watching John Cole. He conveyed the drama and importance of politics." The Scottish First Minister Alex Salmond said that Cole was "an extremely able journalist but also extraordinarily helpful and generous to a young politician." The BBC's political editor at the time, Nick Robinson, wrote that Cole "shaped the way all in my trade do our jobs".

Media offices
Preceded by Patrick Monkhouse	Deputy Editor: The Guardian; 1969–1975	Succeeded by David McKie
Preceded by Donald Trelford	Deputy Editor: The Observer; 1976–1981	Succeeded by Anthony Howard
Preceded by John Simpson	Political Editor: BBC News; 1981–1992	Succeeded by Robin Oakley
