= Material Girls: Why Reality Matters for Feminism =

2021 book by Kathleen Stock

- Author: Kathleen Stock
- Publisher: Fleet
- Publication date: 2021
- ISBN: 978-0-349-72659-5

Material Girls: Why Reality Matters for Feminism is a 2021 book by Kathleen Stock which explores issues related to transgender civil rights and feminism. The book reached number 13 on the UK list of bestselling non-fiction charts.

== Summary ==
In this book, Stock critiques the theory that individuals have an inner feeling known as a gender identity that is more socially significant than an individual's biological sex. Stock surveys and critiques the philosophical ideas underpinning this theory and argues that that biological sex performs an important social role in the contexts of exclusive spaces and resources, healthcare, epidemiology, political organization and data collection for cis women.

Stock argues that biological sex is material (physical) and has social relevance. She proposes that biological sex is binary in nature, which is in opposition to some scientific perspectives which understand it as a spectrum. Stock argues for a narrower definition of intersex and that it does not negate that sex is binary, as "difficulty about borderline cases is absolutely standard for biological categories". Stock argues that entry to "women's only spaces" (e.g. prisons, domestic violence shelters, hospital wards, toilets) ought to be based on the individual's biological sex as opposed to their gender identity, and that they should be provided legal protection on a separate basis.

== Reception ==
Reviewing in The Times, Emma Duncan called the book an easy read and said it helped her understand trans issues better. In The Telegraph, Jane O'Grady describes the book as brave, enlightening and closely argued. Gaby Hinsliff reviewed the book in The Guardian together with Helen Joyce's book Trans: When Ideology Meets Reality. Hinsliff said that Stock's book used a cooler lens than Joyce's and is focused on abstract concepts rather than personal stories.

Reviewing in The Philosophers' Magazine, Julian Baggini comments that Stock's work is not the last word on the debate but a legitimate contribution, arguing that it is far from obvious that gender self-identification is the only legitimate criterion for identifying as a sex or gender and that those who do not accept this position should be taken seriously.

Julie Bindel, author of Feminism for Women: The Real Route to Liberation and one of the people thanked by Stock in the book, wrote in The Spectator that Material Girls was meticulously researched and carefully argued. However, Bindel also said that Stock incorrectly conflates feminists with gender critical activists, and that Stock's critique of standpoint epistemology, while valid in Bindel's opinion, does not distinguish the second wave feminist idea of the personal is political which focuses on connecting individual experiences to social forces rather than privileging these experiences epistemically.

Philosopher Adam Briggle, himself the parent of a transgender son in Texas, argued in the Social Epistemology Review and Reply Collective that Stock's framing choices, policy recommendations, and conclusions are not "logical consequence of her or anyone else's theory" but her own pre-established positions and read "more like paranoia than a calculation rooted in reality". Briggle said Stock had only considered "the handful" of transgender people who could be used as examples to support these positions, while ignoring the experiences and concerns of transgender people in general.

Professor Alex Sharpe found the book fell short of the claims made on its behalf and contributed to "the toxicity surrounding trans people and they make it more difficult for us to live our lives." as the book contained many errors such as Stock's definition of sex being binary or how individual cases of violence committed by trans women are used to form spurious conclusions on trans women inclusion in women's prisons despite evidence to the contrary being available.

== See also ==
- Irreversible Damage, a 2020 book by Abigail Shrier
- Trans: When Ideology Meets Reality, a 2021 book by Helen Joyce
- Time to Think, a 2023 book by Hannah Barnes
