= Mark Frith (journalist) =

British journalist and editor (born 1970)

- Born: 22 May 1970 (age 56); Sheffield, England
- Occupations: Journalist; music critic; editor
- Known for: Heat, Time Out, Smash Hits, SKY Magazine

Mark Frith (born 22 May 1970, in Sheffield) is a British journalist, music critic, and editor. He has been a writer and editor for magazines such as Smash Hits, Time Out and Heat. He has since branched into TV and radio presenting, and has written multiple books.

== Early life ==
Mark Frith was born in Sheffield on 22 May 1970. He attended Gleadless Valley Secondary Comprehensive School in Norton, Sheffield, before going on to study at the University of East London, where he edited the college magazine Overdraft, but did not graduate.

== Career ==
Frith joined the editorial team at Smash Hits in 1990, and became editor in 1994, at the age of 23. He then edited SKY Magazine from 1996 to late 1997, before helping to develop Heat magazine (which launched in 1999). He was put in charge in early 2000 and transformed the title from a 60,000-a-week selling magazine to sales of over half a million an issue. He left the magazine in May 2008, having landed a book deal with Ebury Publishing. Following this he became editor for London listings magazine Time Out from 2009 until July 2011, when he was succeeded as editor by Tim Arthur. Frith subsequently became a contributor to 1980s-themed music magazine Classic Pop.

In 2015, Frith became editor-in-chief of Now magazine. Two years later, he was appointed editorial director of TV and radio listings magazine Radio Times; he left the position in 2020.

Frith has won magazine publishing awards in Britain including PPA Editor of the Year (twice) and, in 2005, the Mark Boxer Award for Outstanding Achievement in British Magazines at the BSME Awards. In October 2002, Frith began a stint as presenter of the BBC's Liquid News, and later appeared on Radio 4's Front Row and BBC2's The Apprentice: You're Fired!

The rights to adapt Frith's 2008 book, The Celeb Diaries, into a TV series, were acquired by Big Talk Studios.

== Bibliography ==
- Frith, Mark (12 October 2006). The Best of Smash Hits: The 80s. Sphere Books. ISBN 978-0316027090.
- Frith, Mark (4 September 2008). The Celeb Diaries. Ebury Press. ISBN 978-0-09-192798-1.

Media offices
Preceded by Ben Preston	Editor: Radio Times; 2017-2020	Succeeded by Tom Loxley and Shem Law
