= Donald Trelford =

British journalist and academic (1937–2023)

Donald Besch
- Born: 9 November 1937; Coventry, England
- Died: 27 January 2023 (aged 85); Mallorca, Spain
- Education: Bablake School; Selwyn College, Cambridge
- Occupation: Journalist
- Title: Editor of The Observer
- Term: 1975–1993
- Spouses: Jan Ingram (divorced); Katherine Mark (divorced); Claire Bishop (m. 2001)
- Children: 6

Donald Gilchrist Trelford (9 November 1937 – 27 January 2023) was a British journalist and academic who was editor of The Observer newspaper from 1975 to 1993. He was also a director of The Observer from 1975 to 1993 and chief executive from 1992 to 1993.

== Early life ==
Trelford was born in Coventry. He was educated at Bablake School, Coventry, where he was school captain from 1955 to 1956. He completed his degree at Selwyn College, Cambridge.

== Career ==
In 1994, he was appointed professor of Journalism Studies at the University of Sheffield, and became a visiting professor in 2004 and emeritus professor in 2007.

Trelford was a member of the Council of the Advertising Standards Authority until 2008 and chairman of the London Press Club. He was also a member of the Newspaper Panel of the Competition Commission from 2001 to 2007.

Trelford was a regular broadcaster and published books on snooker and cricket and co-authored (with Daniel King) a book on the 1993 Times World Chess Championship in London between Nigel Short and Garry Kasparov.

Trelford was interviewed by National Life Stories (C467/12) in 2007 for the 'Oral History of the British Press' collection held by the British Library.

== Personal life and death ==
Trelford had three marriages and six children. He had three children from his first marriage, to Jan Ingram, whom he married in or around 1963. He had another child from his second marriage, to Katherine Mark. In 2001, he married former television presenter Claire Bishop, and they had children in 2011 and 2014, when Trelford was 73 and 76. He lived in England and Mallorca.

Trelford died from cancer in Mallorca, on 27 January 2023, at the age of 85.

Media offices
Preceded by Michael Davie	Deputy Editor of The Observer; 1969–1975	Succeeded by John Cole
Preceded by David Astor	Editor of The Observer; 1975–1993	Succeeded by Jonathan Fenby
