= Ben Preston =

British journalist (born 1963)

- Born: 24 September 1963 (age 62); Crosby, Lancashire, England
- Education: Alleyn's School
- Alma mater: University of Bristol; City University
- Occupations: Magazine editor, journalist
- Spouse: Janice Turner
- Children: 2 sons
- Parent: Peter Preston

James Ben Preston (born 24 September 1963) is a British journalist. He is an executive editor of The Sunday Times and a former editor of the Radio Times.

== Early life ==
His father was Peter Preston, editor of The Guardian from 1975 to 1995, and his wife Jean Burrell; he has a brother and two sisters. Preston attended Alleyn's School in Dulwich, London. At the University of Bristol, he studied politics. He gained an MA in journalism from London's City University.

== Career ==
He began his career in 1987, working on local newspapers (Bristol Evening Post). He worked later for the Press Association as education correspondent before joining The Times. He was The Times deputy editor from 2000 to 2008 and Acting Editor for nine months. Subsequently, he was Executive Editor at The Independent from 2008.

On 17 June 2009, it was announced that he had been appointed as Editor of Radio Times. He was awarded Editors' Editor in the 2016 BSME awards. He remained at the Radio Times until early 2017. In March 2017, it was announced that he had been appointed as an Executive Editor of The Sunday Times.

== Personal life ==
Preston is married to The Times columnist Janice Turner. He is a cyclist and a Millwall supporter. He lives in Camberwell, and has two sons.

Media offices
Preceded by Gill Hudson	Editor: Radio Times; 2009-2017	Succeeded by Mark Frith
