= Yutori Takai =

Japanese philosopher (born 1990)

Yutori Takai (高井 ゆと里, Takai Yutori; born 1990) is a Japanese philosopher specializing in Western philosophy—particularly the study of Martin Heidegger—as well as bioethics (including research ethics and reproductive ethics) and transgender studies. They are a project researcher in the Department of Death and Life Studies and Practical Ethics at the University of Tokyo's Graduate School of Humanities and Sociology.

== Biography ==
Takai graduated from the Department of Thought and Culture, Faculty of Letters, at the University of Tokyo in March 2013, and earned a master's degree in ethics from the university's Graduate School of Humanities and Sociology in March 2015. After completing doctoral coursework in ethics in August 2019, they received a Doctor of Literature degree from the University of Tokyo in February 2020.

Beginning in 2017, Takai taught as a part-time lecturer at several institutions, including Chiba University and Saitama Medical University. They subsequently served as a project researcher at the National Cancer Center from August 2019 and as a lecturer at Ishikawa Prefectural Nursing University from April 2021. In April 2022, Takai joined the Faculty of Informatics at Gunma University as an associate professor, holding the position until September 2025.

Takai came out publicly as non-binary in November 2021.

== Research and activities ==
Having participated in Sumihiko Kumano's seminar as an undergraduate, Takai wrote their bachelor's thesis on Martin Heidegger's Being and Time and has since focused on Heideggerian philosophy. Philosopher Fumitaka Maruyama praised Takai's 2022 book, Heidegger: Living Being-in-the-World, as an outstanding Japanese-language introduction to Heidegger.

In 2023, Takai co-authored Introduction to Transgender (Toransujendā nyūmon) with Akira Shūji, widely noted as Japan's first general introductory book on transgender topics. The book was favorably reviewed by critics and scholars—including Satetsu Takeda, Yumiko Ehara, Kazuki Sakuraba, Nayuta Miki, and Daisaburo Hashizume—for its accessible examination of contemporary discrimination against transgender people. Takai has also co-authored and edited works exploring gender from transgender perspectives and examining Japan's Act on Special Cases in Handling Gender Status for Persons with Gender Identity Disorder. In addition to their academic work, Takai serves as an advisor to the advocacy organization T-Net.

== Awards ==
- 2021 – Young Researcher Paper Encouragement Award, Japan Association for Bioethics (for the paper "The Ethical Problem of Excluding Pregnant Women from Clinical Research", co-authored with Kenji Matsui)
- 2022 – 4th place, Kinokuniya Jinbun Taishō (for the translation The Transgender Issue: An Argument for Justice)
- 2024 – 3rd place, Kinokuniya Jinbun Taishō (for Introduction to Transgender, co-authored with Akira Shūji)
- 2024 – 5th place, Shinsho Taishō (for Introduction to Transgender, co-authored with Akira Shūji)

== Selected works ==
=== Single-authored ===
- Haidegā: Sekai-nai-sonzai o ikiru [Heidegger: Living Being-in-the-World] (ハイデガー：世界内存在を生きる). Sensho Métier. Kodansha, 2022. ISBN 978-4-06-526940-4.

=== Co-authored ===
- Toransujendā nyūmon [Introduction to Transgender] (トランスジェンダー入門). With Akira Shūji. Shueisha Shinsho. Shueisha, 2023. ISBN 978-4-08-721274-7.
- Toransujendā Q&A: Soboku na gimon ga ukandara [Transgender Q&A: When Simple Questions Arise] (トランスジェンダーQ＆A：素朴な疑問が浮かんだら). With Akira Shūji. Seikyūsha, May 2024. ISBN 978-4-7872-3536-7.

=== Edited ===
- Toransujendā to seibetsu henkō: Kore made to kore kara [Transgender People and Legal Gender Change: Past and Future] (トランスジェンダーと性別変更：これまでとこれから). Iwanami Booklet. Iwanami Shoten, 2024. ISBN 978-4-00-271090-7.

=== Translations ===
- Faye, Shon. Toransujendā mondai: Giron wa seigi no tame ni (トランスジェンダー問題：議論は正義のために). Commentary by Akiko Shimizu. Akashi Shoten, 2022. ISBN 978-4-7503-5463-7. (Japanese translation of The Transgender Issue: An Argument for Justice)
- Thorn, Theresa. Jibun de aru tte ii kanji: Kimi to jendā ni tsuite no hon (じぶんであるっていいかんじ：きみとジェンダーについての本). Illustrated by Noah Grigni. Etcetera Books, 2024. ISBN 978-4-909910-22-6. (Japanese translation of It Feels Good to Be Yourself: A Book About Gender Identity)
