= Sarah Tisdall =

FCO whistleblower (1983)

Sarah Caroline Tisdall
- Born: 1960 (age 65–66); Plymouth, England, UK
- Occupation: Clerical officer
- Employer: Foreign and Commonwealth Office
- Known for: Leaking government documents
- Criminal charges: Section 2 of the Official Secrets Act 1911

Sarah Caroline Tisdall (born 1960 in Plymouth) is a former Foreign & Commonwealth Office (FCO) clerical officer who was jailed for leaking British government documents to a newspaper in 1983.

In 1983, the UK government agreed to base nuclear armed cruise missiles in the UK. The decision was controversial and defence minister Michael Heseltine and Prime Minister Margaret Thatcher wanted to keep the missiles' arrival date a secret to minimise potential demonstrations. Tisdall anonymously sent The Guardian photocopied documents detailing when the missiles would be arriving in Britain. The documents set out the political tactics Heseltine would use to present the matter in the House of Commons.

The Government brought a legal action against The Guardian, seeking an order requiring the newspaper to reveal its source. Although The Guardian successfully argued that it was protected by section 10 of the Contempt of Court Act 1981 from providing the information, the decision by Mr Justice Scott was almost immediately overturned. The appeal by the Attorney General was on the grounds that although the documents themselves were harmless, a civil servant capable of leaking them might leak other documents which could pose a threat to national security.

The editor of the Guardian, Peter Preston, was prepared to defy the court order and go to prison, but was advised that it was more likely that a fine would be imposed on the newspaper, increasing as long as refusal persisted. This could potentially bankrupt the paper. Defying the order would also violate the Guardian's policy that the law should be obeyed. A meeting of Guardian journalists was held, in a mood that was, according to David McKie, deputy editor at the time, troubled but sympathetic rather than outraged.

After the meeting Preston complied with the court order to hand over the documents—which he described as the worst day of his 20-year editorship—and immediately submitted his resignation, which was not accepted. The documents were identified as coming from an FCO photocopying machine, which led to Tisdall. In March 1984, Tisdall pleaded guilty to a charge under section 2 of the Official Secrets Act 1911. She was sentenced to six months in prison, and released after four months.

The legality of the Order (compelling The Guardian to surrender the documents, and thus reveal their source) was upheld in a decision of the House of Lords (Secretary of State for Defence v. Guardian Newspapers Ltd. [1985] AC 339) by a majority of three against two.

As of 2005, Tisdall worked for an ethical property company developing accommodation for charitable organisations and community groups.

== See also ==
- Intermediate-Range Nuclear Forces Treaty
- Clive Ponting was another civil servant who leaked defence information but was acquitted by the jury, who accepted his public interest defence.
- Katharine Gun – British linguist, translator and whistleblower (born 1974) (formerly of GCHQ)
- Thomas Andrews Drake and Thomas Tamm leaked information about the American National Security Agency.
- Source protection – information about laws protecting journalists from being compelled to reveal the identity of an anonymous source.
- Journalism source protection
