= Jack Turban =

American psychiatrist, writer and commentator

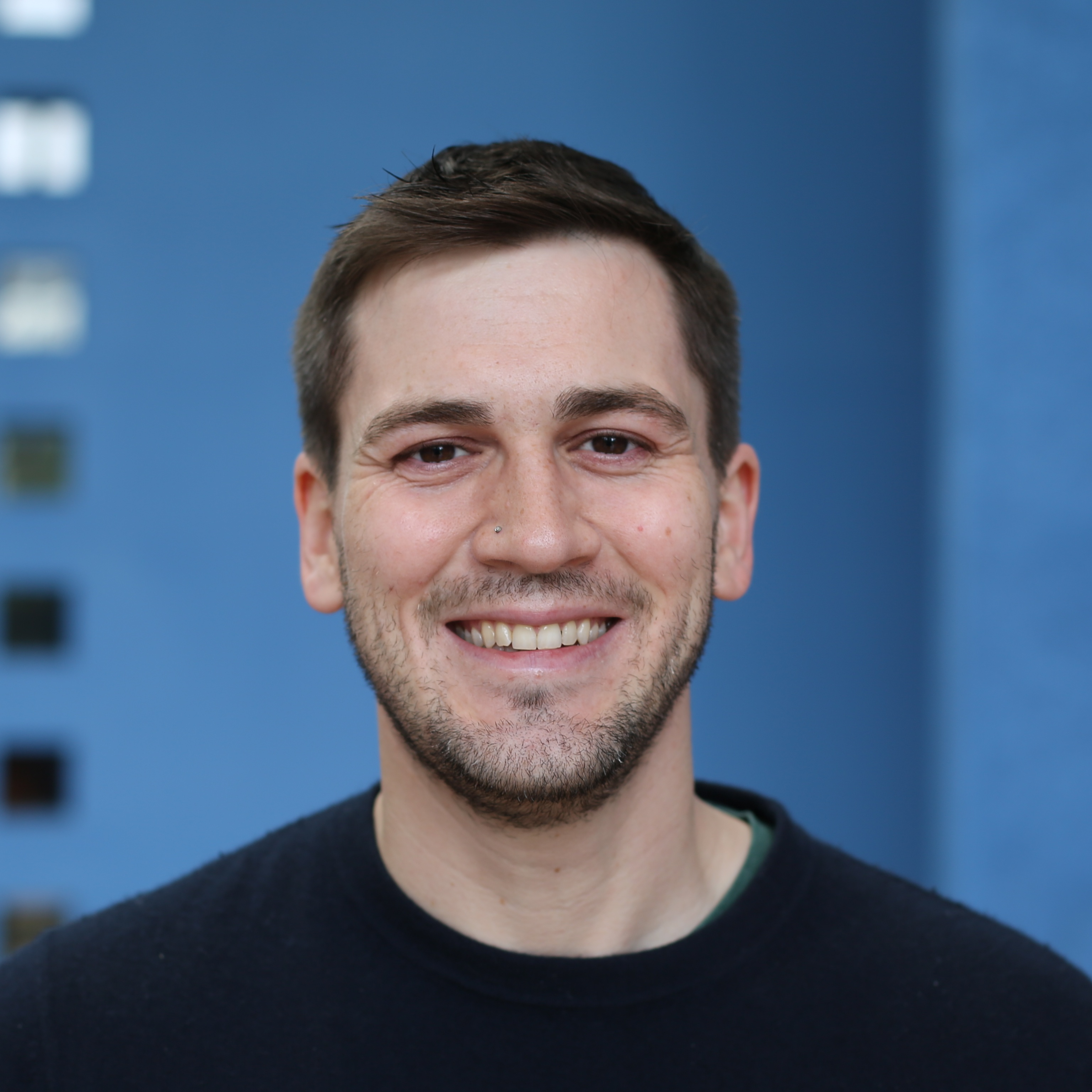
- Born: Pittsburgh, Pennsylvania, U.S.
- Education: Harvard University (BA); Yale University (MD, MHS)
- Occupations: Psychiatrist, writer, and researcher
- Employer: University of California San Francisco
- Known for: LGBTQ mental health research

Jack Turban is an American psychiatrist, author, and commentator on gender, sexuality, mental health, and law. His writing has appeared in The New York Times, The Washington Post, The Los Angeles Times, CNN, Scientific American, and Vox. He is an associate professor of child and adolescent psychiatry at The University of California San Francisco where he is founding director of the UCSF Gender Psychiatry Program and affiliate faculty in health policy at The Philip R. Lee Institute for Health Policy Studies. He has served as an expert witness and amicus curiae in several landmark U.S. Supreme Court cases including United States v. Skrmetti, Hecox v Little, and Chiles v Salazar.

== Early life and education ==
Turban was born in Pittsburgh, Pennsylvania. Fearful of violence from his father, he did not come out as gay until he attended college. He later wrote in The New England Journal of Medicine about his early experiences of childhood homophobia and how they influenced his experience of medical education. Turban attended Harvard College where he studied neuroscience, then earned his medical and master of health science degrees from Yale School of Medicine. He completed psychiatry residency at McLean Hospital (Harvard Medical School) in 2020 and child and adolescent psychiatry fellowship at Stanford University School of Medicine in 2022.

== Career ==
Turban is an associate professor of child and adolescent psychiatry and health policy at the University of California, San Francisco. He has published studies showing that gender identity conversion therapies (attempts to make transgender people cisgender) are widespread in the US and associated with suicide attempts. His research has shown that access to gender-affirming medical care (puberty blockers and gender-affirming hormones) during adolescence is linked to better mental health outcomes in adulthood. He has also been one of the few researchers to publish on the topic of gender de-transition, including in the academic literature.

Turban has been critical of Wall Street Journal writer Abigail Shrier's book Irreversible Damage, which alleges that a recent surge in adolescents becoming transgender is taking place, supposedly due to social contagion. He claimed that the book misinterpreted and omitted important scientific evidence about young people and gender identity. He subsequently co-authored a study arguing that gender dysphoria in children was not caused by social contagion.

Turban has been critical of the geosocial networking application Grindr, and argued in Vox that the app may have detrimental effects on the mental health of gay men. He has complained that Grindr does not do enough to keep minors off of their platform, and that this may pose sexual risk to young people. His opinion piece for The New York Times about minors on Grindr was one of several LGBT articles that were conspicuously censored with large white boxes in The New York Times print edition in Qatar.

In 2024, he published Free to Be: Understanding Kids & Gender Identity, a trade book from Simon & Shuster about the science, medicine, and politics of gender identity among young people. The book received a starred review from Publishers Weekly and positive coverage from The New York Times, NPR, USA Today, PBS NewsHour, and Kirkus.

Turban resigned from the NCAA Committee on Competitive Safeguards and Medical Aspects of sports in 2025, following the NCAA's decision to prohibit transgender women from competing in women's sports leagues, noting that the organization did not consult its medical or scientific experts prior to issuing the decision, which was viewed as a political reaction to the Trump administration.
