= Christina Patterson =

British journalist

- Born: Christina Mary Patterson ca. 8th December 1963; Rome, Italy
- Education: Van Mildert College, Durham; University of East Anglia (MA)
- Occupations: Journalist and writer

Christina Mary Patterson (born 8 December 1963) is a British journalist. Now a freelancer, she was formerly a writer and columnist at The Independent.

== Biography ==
Patterson was born in Rome to a Swedish Lutheran mother and Scottish Presbyterian father who both regularly attended church services. After graduating with first-class honours in English Language and Literature from Durham University (Van Mildert College) and then undertaking an MA at the University of East Anglia, Patterson initially worked in publishing. From 1990, she was the literary programmer at the Southbank Centre, presenting hundreds of literary events. In 1998, she ran the Poetry Society's National Lottery-funded Poetry Places scheme, enabling poetry residencies and placements. In 2000 she was appointed Director of the Poetry Society.

After 1998, Patterson worked as a freelance journalist contributing to The Observer, The Sunday Times and magazines including Time, The Spectator and the New Statesman. She has contributed to a number of books, including The Cambridge Guide To Women's Writing and the Forward Poetry Anthology 2001, in addition to HuffPost.

Patterson joined The Independent in 2003, writing on politics, society, culture, books, travel and the arts. She was responsible for the paper's weekly Arts interview, and had periods there as deputy literary editor and assistant comment editor. She was made redundant from The Independent in 2013 as a result of cuts in its editorial budget.

Patterson has investigated nursing, a profession she has personally found uncaring, in a series of articles for The Independent, and a programme for BBC Radio 4's Four Thoughts series, an essay which The Guardian reviewer Elisabeth Mahoney found "compellingly written and studded with rhetorical flourishes and unpalatable assertions". The investigative work on nursing, which had its origins in Patterson's experience of having six operations in eight years resulting from breast cancer, led in 2013 to her being short-listed for the Orwell Prize (Journalism). She is a regular participant in The Review Show (BBC Two) as a member of its panel.

A supporter of Humanists UK, Patterson is also a member of team at the Nottingham Trent University's "Writers for the Future" programme.

In 2010, the Simon Wiesenthal Center, an anti-racist watchdog group, selected one of Patterson's columns as among the top ten anti-Semitic incidents of that year. She had written in The Independent: "I would like to teach some of my neighbours some manners … I don't care if they wear frock coats and funny suits and hats covered in plastic bags and insist on wearing their hair in ringlets (if they're male) or covered up by wigs (if they're female), but I do think they could treat their neighbours with a bit more courtesy and respect. I didn't realize that goyim were about as welcome in the Hasidic Jewish shops as Martin Luther King, Jr. at a Ku Klux Klan convention. I didn't realize that a purchase by a goy was a crime to be punished with monosyllabic terseness or that bus seats were a potential source of contamination or that road signs and parking restrictions were for people who hadn't been chosen by God." Patterson responded to the assertions made by the Simon Wiesenthal Center in a column titled "How I was smeared as an anti-Semite", in which she defended her original prose.

Her book, The Art of Not Falling Apart, was published in May 2018. Patterson's second book, Outside the Sky is Blue was published in February 2022. Writing for the Guardian, Blake Morrison described the book as "a journey to dark places" - and then adds, "it's too honest and well written to be dispiriting". Laura Pullman, concluded in her review for the Sunday Times, "This is a memoir about family loyalty and gut-wrenching goodbyes, but it serves too as a wise guide from someone who has endured more than her share of life’s slings and arrows, and has still come out swinging".
