= Kathleen Stock =

British analytical philosopher and writer

Kathleen Stock OBE
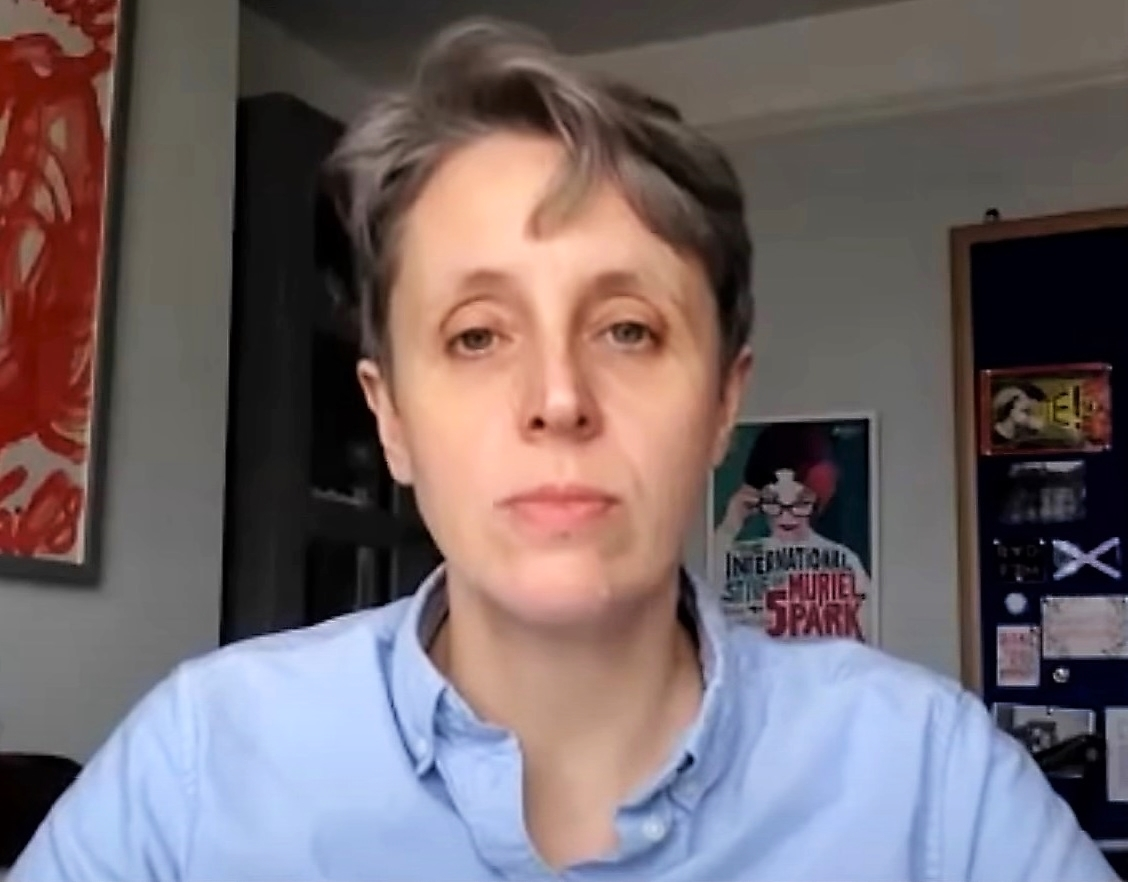
- Stock interviewed in 2021
- Born: Kathleen Mary Linn Stock; 1971 or 1972 (age 54–55); Aberdeen, Scotland, UK

Education
- Education: Exeter College, Oxford (BA); University of St Andrews (MA); University of Leeds (PhD)
- Thesis: The Nature and Value of Imaginative Responses to the Fiction Film (2001)

Philosophical work
- Institutions: University of Sussex
- Main interests: Aesthetics; fiction; imagination; sexual objectification; sexual orientation

Kathleen Mary Linn Stock OBE is a British philosopher and writer. She was a professor of philosophy at the University of Sussex until 2021. She has published academic work on aesthetics, fiction, imagination, sexual objectification, and sexual orientation.

Her opposition to transgender rights and gender identity have become a contentious issue. In December 2020, she was appointed Officer of the Order of the British Empire (OBE) in recognition of services to higher education, a decision criticised by a group of over 600 academic philosophers who argued that Stock's "harmful rhetoric" contributed to the marginalisation of transgender people. In October 2021, she resigned from the University of Sussex. This came after a student campaign called for her dismissal and the university trade union accused the university of "institutional transphobia". A group of over 200 academic philosophers from the UK signed an open letter in support of Stock's academic freedom.

== Early life and education ==
Stock was born in Aberdeen, and was raised in Montrose, Scotland, the daughter of a philosophy lecturer at Aberdeen University, and of a newspaper proofreader. Stock read French and philosophy at Exeter College, Oxford, followed by an MA at the University of St Andrews. She then won a scholarship to enable her to study for a PhD in philosophy at the University of Leeds, where she studied under Matthew Kieran's supervision.

== Academic career ==
Following her graduation, Stock briefly taught at the University of Lancaster and the University of East Anglia before joining the University of Sussex in 2003, where she worked as a reader and later a professor of philosophy. On 28 October 2021, the university announced Stock's resignation from the position following controversy around her views on gender identity; the announcement, written by the school's vice-chancellor, expressed regret that Stock did not "feel able to return to work" and that she had been subject to "bullying and harassment".

Stock has written one monograph as well as articles in peer-reviewed academic journals, and has contributed several chapters to edited volumes. She edited Philosophers on Music: Experience, Meaning, and Work (first edition 2007), and together with Katherine Thomson-Jones, she edited New Waves in Aesthetics (2008). In her monograph Only Imagine: Fiction, Interpretation and Imagination (2017), she argues for authorial intentionalism.

Stock was the vice-president of the British Society of Aesthetics from 2019 to 2020. She has given lectures at the University of York, the Aristotelian Society, the London Aesthetics Forum, the University of Wolverhampton, and the American Society for Aesthetics. On 28 October 2021 Stock resigned from the University of Sussex. Following Stock's resignation, she announced she would be joining the University of Austin as a fellow on a part-time basis without the requirement to move to Austin, Texas.

== Views on gender self-identification ==
Stock is acknowledged as a prominent gender-critical feminist. She has opposed transgender self-identification in regard to proposed reforms to the 2004 UK Gender Recognition Act, and has argued that allowing self-identification would "threaten a secure understanding of the concept 'lesbian'". She has said that many trans women are "still males with male genitalia, many are sexually attracted to females, and they should not be in places where females undress or sleep in a completely unrestricted way." She has denied opposing trans rights, saying, "I gladly and vocally assert the rights of trans people to live their lives free from fear, violence, harassment or any discrimination" and "I think that discussing female rights is compatible with defending these trans rights".

In her 2021 article "What is a woman?", Stock outlines her view that there are two immutable sexes (male and female), that the categories of "man" and "woman" are decided by biological sex and not gender identity, and that views on language to establish more inclusive definitions are "hopeless".

Students and academics began to criticise Stock's views in 2018, when she spoke against proposed changes to the Gender Recognition Act; the changes would have allowed people of all ages to legally self-identify as a particular gender without the requirement of a psychological or medical diagnosis. She received death threats as a result of her position.

In 2019, Stock signed the "Declaration on Women's Sex-Based Rights" from the Women's Human Rights Campaign (WHRC). In June 2019, Stock was invited to speak at the Aristotelian Society about her views on gender identity. The organization Minorities and Philosophy (MAP) UK and their international counterpart released a joint statement against Stock speaking at the event, saying "Not every item of personal and ideological obsession is worthy of philosophical debate. In particular, scepticism about the rights of marginalised groups and individuals, where issues of life and death are at stake, are not up for debate."

In 2020, Stock testified before the Women and Equalities Committee of the House of Commons, and gave oral evidence in response to the reform of the Gender Recognition Act.

Journalist Janice Turner wrote in The Times that Stock "teaches trans students, respecting their pronouns, and has written repeatedly in support of their human rights".

In 2021, Stock made a submission to the proposed Higher Education (Freedom of Speech) Bill, highlighting what she described as harassment and a culture of fear and self-censorship in British universities in relation to her gender-critical views concerning "transactivist demands to recognise and prioritise gender identity".

Her 2021 book, Material Girls: Why Reality Matters for Feminism, offers a critical discussion of gender identity theory. Her thesis, according to reviewer Christina Patterson, is that there is "a new orthodoxy, one in which sex gives way to feeling, and feeling trumps facts". In the book, Stock supports protective laws for trans people, but opposes, according to The Guardian, "the institutionalisation of the idea that gender identity is all that matters – that how you identify automatically confers all the entitlements of that sex". She describes the law that gives trans people the right to change gender as a legal fiction, a kind of "useful untruth".

In May 2021, Stock was appointed as a trustee of the LGB Alliance.

In January 2023, Stock criticized the UK government's proposed ban on conversion therapy, a practice condemned by international medical organizations, saying that "Banning conversion therapy for minors will rob trans children of the chance to think again, putting them on a pathway to medical treatment".

On 9 March 2023, Stock, alongside tennis player Martina Navratilova and writer Julie Bindel, launched The Lesbian Project. The purpose of the Lesbian Project, according to Stock, is "to put lesbian needs and interests back into focus, to stop lesbians disappearing into the rainbow soup and to give them a non-partisan political voice." Explaining her motivation, Stock said: "Lesbians will always exist but we're in a crisis in which young lesbians don't want to be associated with the word. Some of them want to describe themselves as queer and some of them prefer not to see themselves as women but as non-binary." PinkNews said the Lesbian Project was a "group created exclusively for cisgender lesbians – in reaction to trans inclusion in LGBTQ+ spaces".

=== Campaign by students at Sussex University ===
In October 2021, a group describing themselves as queer, trans, and non-binary University of Sussex students began a campaign for Stock to be fired, stating that she was "espousing a bastardised version of radical feminism that excludes and endangers trans people". Students criticised Stock for being a trustee for LGB Alliance and for signing the declaration of the Women's Human Rights Campaign. The group, Anti Terf Sussex, said Stock was a danger to transgender people and that "We're not up for debate. We cannot be reasoned out of existence". A statement on Instagram said it was from "an anonymous, unaffiliated group of queer, trans and non-binary students who will not allow our community to be slandered and harmed by someone who's [sic] salary comes from our pockets". Police advised Stock to take precautions for her safety, including installing CCTV at her home and using bodyguards on campus.

Stock herself said: "Universities aren't places where students should just expect to hear their own thoughts reflected back at them. Arguments should be met by arguments and evidence by evidence, not intimidation or aggression". She said that months previously, she had complained to the University of Sussex, alleging it had failed to protect her and to safeguard her academic freedom.

==== Supporters of Stock's position ====
Junior Minister for Women and Equalities Kemi Badenoch, barrister Allison Bailey, and writer Julie Bindel spoke in Stock's defence and University of Sussex vice-chancellor Adam Tickell condemned the campaign as a threat to academic freedom. Announcing an investigation into the protests, the vice-chancellor stated "I'm really concerned that we have masked protesters putting up posters calling for the sacking of somebody for exercising her right to articulate her views", and that the institution had "legal and moral duties to ensure people can speak freely".

A group of over 200 academic philosophers from the UK signed an open letter in support of Stock's academic freedom, and her ability to engage "in open and scholarly debate without fear of harassment." Another open letter in support of Stock's academic freedom was signed by legal academics.

The Times reported that the head of the Equality and Human Rights Commission, Baroness Falkner of Margravine, "called the attacks on Professor Kathleen Stock disgraceful and said that tougher regulation was needed to protect people from abuse." She said: "The rights of trans people must of course be protected, but the attempt to silence academic freedom of expression is the opposite of what university life is about". Liz Truss, who was the minister for women and equalities at the time, gave Falkner's letter her "full support". Oxford historian Selina Todd described Tickell's statement as paying "lip service to academic freedom while assuring students of the university's 'inclusivity'" and criticised the University and College Union for their silence. The Times published a letter in support of Stock from a group of trans people, saying that they were "appalled that trans rights ... are being used to excuse an unprincipled campaign of harassment and abuse."

A statement of solidarity signed by hundreds of "academics, retired academics, students, alumni and university/college employees" circulated by the GC Academia Network, a group that describes itself as gender-critical, expressed concerns "about the ongoing erosion of women's sex-based rights in law, policy and practice" and condemns the recent escalation of intimidation by a small group.

==== Opponents of Stock's position ====
The Sussex branch of the University and College Union (UCU) strongly criticized the vice-chancellor over his statement, saying that Tickell had not upheld the dignity and respect of trans students and staff. The union said that it stands in solidarity with the students and their right to protest, and that "we urge our management to take a clear and strong stance against transphobia at Sussex." It also called for an investigation into "institutional transphobia" at the University of Sussex. However, it added "we do not endorse the call for any worker to be summarily sacked." Responding to the statement, Stock said that it had "effectively ended" her career at Sussex University.

The Shadow Minister for Women and Equalities, Taiwo Owatemi, called UCU's statement "strong and principled" and said she was "greatly concerned by [Stock's] work as a trustee for the LGB Alliance group" which she said should be "rejected by all those who believe in equality."

Shortly after releasing the statement, members of the UCU Sussex branch executive said they had received personal threats, and had their contact details released. A spokesperson on behalf of the UCU's national organisation condemned this and said "these matters are being raised immediately with leadership at the university."

==== Resignation ====
After announcing her resignation from the university on 28 October 2021, Stock gave a radio interview on Woman's Hour on 3 November. She denied that she is transphobic and explained that her resignation followed attacks on her by colleagues who are opposed to her views and who foster an "extreme" response from their students: "instead of getting involved in arguing with me using reason, evidence – the traditional university methods – they tell their students in lectures that I pose a harm to trans students."

Stock said: "Over time, my teaching about sex and gender in feminist philosophy grew increasingly cautious, and most of my criticism of the sudden sanctification of gender identity took place elsewhere". The vice chancellor of the University of Sussex, professor Sasha Roseneil said: "Obviously she left long before I arrived but it is deeply regrettable that Kathleen [Stock] wasn't supported to the extent that she felt able to stay working at Sussex. I regret that."

=== Investigation by the Office for Students ===
In March 2025, Sussex was fined £585,000 by the Office for Students (OfS), which said it had failed to uphold freedom of speech in its trans and non-binary equality policy statement passed in 2018, which said that course materials should "positively represent trans people" and that "transphobic propaganda" would not be tolerated. The OfS gave the case of Kathleen Stock as an example of the "chilling effect" this had on expression of lawful views. Professor Sasha Roseneil, the university's vice chancellor, said "The way the OfS has conducted this investigation has been completely unacceptable, its findings are egregious and concocted, and the fine that is being imposed on Sussex is wholly disproportionate." The university challenged the decision and it was overturned by judicial review at the High Court on 29 April 2026 with the court upholding accusations that the OfS was biased whilst conducting the investigation.

=== Controversy over appearance at Oxford Union ===
In April 2023, ahead of a planned appearance by Stock at the Oxford Union on 30 May, the Oxford University LGBTQ+ society expressed dismay that the union had "decided to platform the transphobic and trans exclusionary speaker Kathleen Stock".

Subsequently, in May, The Telegraph published a letter from academics endorsing the talk by Stock. The letter said: "Whether or not one agrees with Professor Stock's views, there is no plausible and attractive ideal of academic freedom, or of free speech more generally, which would condemn their expression as outside the bounds of permissible discourse." Over 40 academics and staff signed the letter, including Nigel Biggar and Richard Dawkins.

In response, the LGBTQI+ society organised a letter endorsing opposition to Stock by transgender students. The letter was signed by more than 100 academics and staff and said: "We believe that trans students should not be made to debate their existence. We also refute that this is a free speech issue - disinviting someone is not preventing them from speaking." Stock denied that the existence of trans students was being debated. She said: "We are discussing how the demands of a radical group of trans activists - many of whom are not trans - affect other people. That is not the same thing. I am very clear that trans people deserve full protection under the law."

The talk went ahead on 30 May 2023, albeit with an interruption shortly after the start due to a protestor being glued to the floor wearing a shirt saying "no more dead trans kids". Two other protestors were inside the venue, and many other protestors outside.

=== Gender Wars ===
On the same day as the Oxford Union speech, Channel 4 broadcast Gender Wars, a documentary featuring Stock as the main representative of the gender-critical side of "the trans issue". The documentary centred around an earlier speech Stock made during a debate at the Cambridge Union on the "right to offend," which attracted protests and garnered extensive media coverage at the time. The film was criticised for its focus on Stock, but also praised as giving "voice to both sides of the transgender debate".

== Honours ==
Stock was appointed Officer of the Order of the British Empire (OBE) in the 2021 New Year Honours for services to higher education. In response, over 600 academics signed a letter criticising the government's decision and expressing concern about a "tendency to mistake transphobic fear mongering for valuable scholarship, and attacks on already marginalised people for courageous exercises of free speech". Stock responded that the content of the letter was ridiculous, saying "they accused me of completely wild things like supporting patriarchy and preventing transgender people from accessing medical care, even though I have not said anything about it except when it comes to children". A counter letter defending her was signed by more than 400.

== Personal life ==
Stock is lesbian, having come out in her late 30s; in Material Girls, she describes herself as "a lesbian and... a sex-nonconforming woman". Janice Turner in The Times described her, amongst other terms, as a "left-wing lesbian". She lives in Sussex with her wife Laura, and two sons from a previous marriage.

== Selected works ==
- Philosophers on Music: Experience, Meaning, and Work (Oxford University Press, 2007), ed.
- New Waves in Aesthetics, edited with Katherine Thomson-Jones (Palgrave-Macmillan, 2008).
- Fantasy, imagination, and film. British Journal of Aesthetics, 2009. 49 (4): 357–369.
- Fictive Utterance and Imagining. Aristotelian Society Supplementary Volume. 2011, 85 (1): 145–161.
- Some Reflections on Seeing-as, Metaphor-Grasping and Imagining. Aisthesis: Pratiche, Linguaggi E Saperi Dell'Estetico. 2013, 6 (1): 201–213.
- Imagining and Fiction: Some Issues. Philosophy Compass. 2013, 8 (10): 887–896.
- Sexual Objectification. Analysis, 2015, 75 (2): 191–195.
- Learning from fiction and theories of fictional content. Teorema: International Journal of Philosophy, 2016, (3): 69–83.
- Only Imagine: Fiction, Interpretation and Imagination (Oxford University Press, 2017).
- Material Girls: Why Reality Matters for Feminism (Fleet, 2021).
