= Abigail Shrier =

American freelance journalist and author

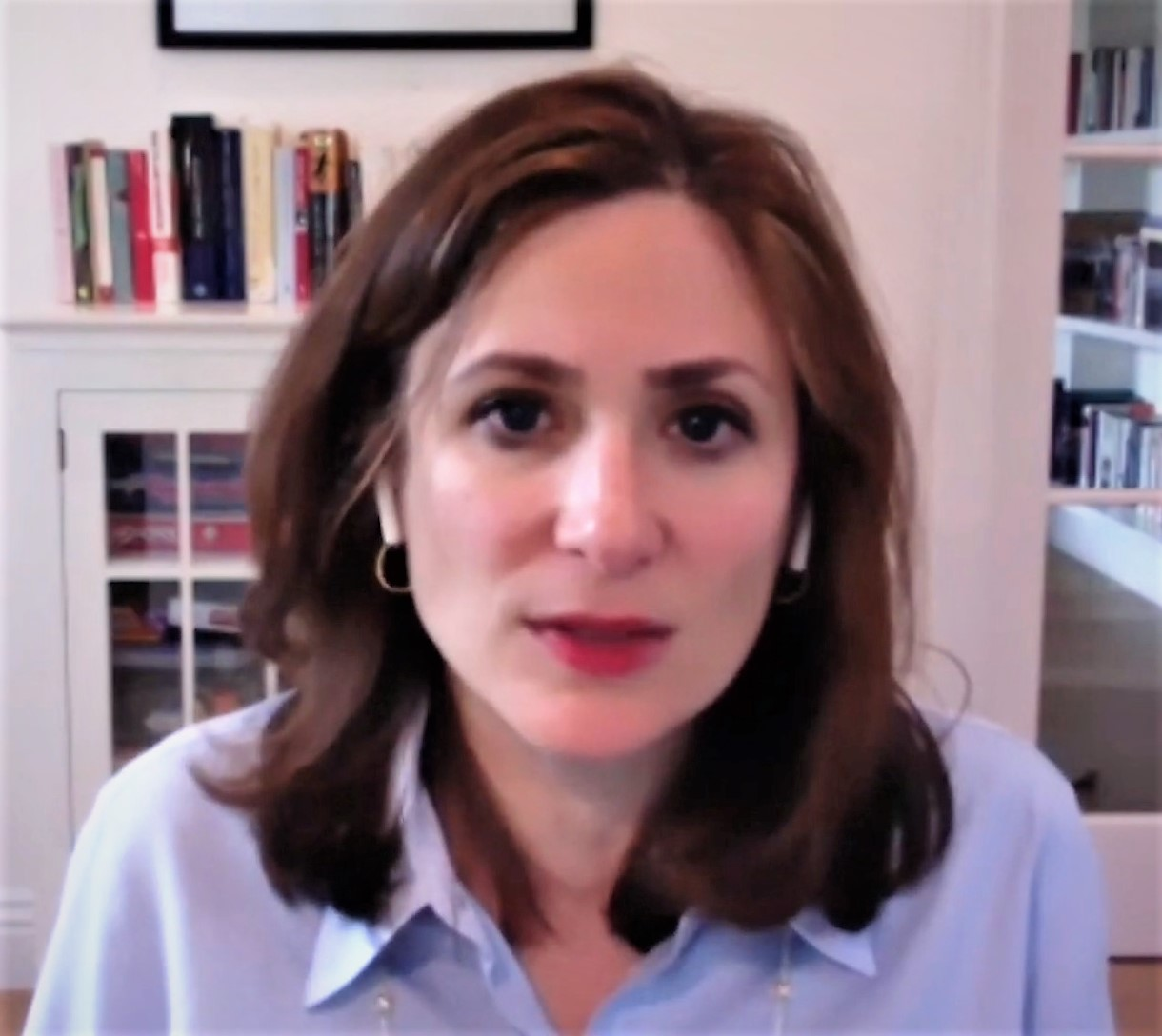
- Shrier in 2020
- Born: Abigail Brett Krauser; 1978 (age 47–48); Maryland, U.S.
- Education: Columbia University (BA); University of Oxford (BPhil); Yale University (JD)
- Occupations: Author; journalist
- Known for: Irreversible Damage (2020)
- Website: abigailshrier.com

Abigail Krauser Shrier (née Krauser; born 1978) is an American author.

== Early life and education ==
Shrier is the daughter of Peter B. Krauser and Sherrie L. Krauser, both judges in the state of Maryland. She grew up in a Conservative synagogue, and was educated in a Jewish day school that was predominantly Conservative. She graduated from Columbia University with a Bachelor of Arts in philosophy, and earned a Kellett Fellowship. She then attended the University of Oxford, where she received a B.Phil. in philosophy, and Yale Law School, where she was a Coker Fellow.

== Career ==
From 2018 through 2020, Shrier wrote opinion pieces for the Wall Street Journal.

In 2020, Shrier's book Irreversible Damage: The Transgender Craze Seducing Our Daughters was published by Regnery Publishing. The book supports the rapid onset gender dysphoria hypothesis. (Note: WPATH Global Board of Directors, WPATH Position on "Rapid-Onset Gender Dysphoria (ROGD)" (4 September 2018); accessed 30 May 2019. "Rapid Onset Gender Dysphoria (ROGD)" is not a medical entity recognized by any major professional association, nor is it listed as a subtype or classification in the Diagnostic and Statistical Manual of Mental Disorders (DSM) or International Classification of Diseases (ICD). Therefore, it constitutes nothing more than an acronym created to describe a proposed clinical phenomenon that may or may not warrant further peer-reviewed scientific investigation. At present, WPATH asserts that knowledge of the factors contributing to gender identity development in adolescence is still evolving and not yet fully understood by scientists, clinicians, community members, and other stakeholders in equal measure.") Shrier has previously criticised the use of the singular they, comparing it to idol worship. Shrier appeared on the Joe Rogan Experience to discuss her views on transgender people, a conversation that was also streamed on Spotify and subsequently sparked complaints from the platform's employees. Her book was controversial for its views about transgender issues and has been described by the author and other commentators as subject to a campaign of censorship. It was first withdrawn, and then reinstated, by retailer Target. The Economist gave the book a positive review, and included it in their 2020 list of Economist Books of the Year. A reader erected a billboard in Los Angeles that read, "Get the facts, read this book", in support of the ideas in the book. Her book was criticized by psychiatrist Jack Turban in 2020 for misinterpreting and omitting scientific evidence to support her claims. Time also reported that hundreds of Amazon employees petitioned to stop the book's sale on Amazon, criticizing its harmful portrayal of the transgender community.

In 2024, Shrier published Bad Therapy: Why the Kids aren't Growing Up, which details her thoughts on the origins and solution to the American mental health crisis.

In 2025, she was awarded the RealClearPolitics Samizdat Prize, alongside Linda Yaccarino, CEO of X, and Jonathan Turley.
