= Peter Preston =

British journalist (1938–2018)

- Born: Peter John Preston; 23 May 1938; Barrow upon Soar, Leicestershire, England
- Died: 6 January 2018 (aged 79)
- Education: Loughborough Grammar School
- Alma mater: St John's College, Oxford
- Occupations: Journalist, author, and editor
- Title: Editor, The Guardian
- Term: 1975–1995
- Predecessor: Alastair Hetherington
- Successor: Alan Rusbridger
- Spouse: Jean Burrell
- Children: 4, including Ben Preston
- Relatives: Janice Turner (daughter-in-law)

Peter John Preston (23 May 1938 – 6 January 2018) was a British journalist and author. He was editor of The Guardian for twenty years, from 1975 to 1995.

== Early life ==
Peter Preston was born in Barrow upon Soar, Leicestershire, the son of John Preston, a greengrocery business manager, and his wife, Kathlyn Preston (née Chell). He grew up in the village of Quorn, two miles south of Loughborough.

His father died from polio when Preston was a child, and he subsequently caught the disease; he spent 18 months in and out of hospital, including time in an iron lung. The disease caused permanent damage to his body. He was educated at Loughborough Grammar School and St John's College, Oxford, where he edited the student paper Cherwell.

== Career ==
Preston started his career at the Liverpool Daily Post in 1959, and joined The Guardian (then the Manchester Guardian) in 1963. He rose to become editor in 1975 and remained so for more than twenty years, retiring in 1995. He reported on Conservative MPs, including the perjurious Jonathan Aitken and the cash-for-questions affair involving Neil Hamilton and Tim Smith. In both instances, a source was Harrods and Paris Ritz owner Mohammed Al-Fayed. Preston was also editor when The Guardian was forced to hand over leaked government documents, which were then traced to a Foreign Office copier, leading to Sarah Tisdall, who was subsequently imprisoned under the Official Secrets Act 1911.

He continued as a columnist for the rest of his life. He contributed a weekly column to The Observer, "Peter Preston on press and broadcasting", devoted mainly to news about newspapers, their readers and (generally) diminishing circulations in the newspaper's "business and media" section. He was one of the founders of the European Press Prize and acted as chairman of its preparatory committee from 2013 until 2017. He had strong opinions on Brexit and the balance of the BBC and continued to take to social media to discuss this after his retirement. He was a member of the Scott Trust (owner of The Guardian and Observer) from 1979 to 2003, chairman of the International Press Institute from 1995 to 1997, and chairman of the Association of British Press Editors. Preston wrote two novels, Bess (1999) and 51st State (1998).

== Personal life and honours ==
In 1962, Preston married Jean Burrell, and they had four children. His son, Ben Preston, is a former deputy editor of The Times and Radio Times, and is executive editor of The Sunday Times.

Preston received honorary degrees from the City University, London, and the universities of Leicester, Loughborough, Essex and Roehampton.

Preston died on 6 January 2018 after suffering from melanoma.

== Bibliography ==
- Bess (Viking, 1999) ISBN 0-670-88765-X
- 51st State (Viking, 1998) ISBN 0-670-88107-4

Media offices
Preceded by Alastair Hetherington	Editor of The Guardian; 1975 - 1995	Succeeded by Alan Rusbridger
