= Janice Turner =

British journalist

- Born: 8 April 1964 (age 62); Wakefield, West Yorkshire, England
- Education: Ridgewood School
- Alma mater: University of Sussex
- Occupation: Journalist
- Known for: Columnist and feature writer for The Times
- Spouse: Ben Preston (m. 1995)
- Relatives: Peter Preston (father-in-law)

Janice Turner (born 8 April 1964) is a British journalist, and a columnist and feature writer for The Times.

== Early life ==
Turner was born in Wakefield, West Yorkshire. She went to Ridgewood School in the north of Doncaster. She attended the University of Sussex, where she spent a year as an elected Student Union Officer and edited the Unionews magazine.

== Career ==
Before taking up her present post at The Times, Turner was a magazine editor for several women's titles, launching That's Life and Real. She left to write occasional columns for The Guardian and wrote a column about magazines for the Press Gazette.

== Accolades ==
Turner won Interviewer of the Year in the 2014 and 2019 British Press Awards. She was shortlisted for best columnist in 2005, 2007, and 2008, 2016 (highly commended), 2017, 2018 and 2019. She was shortlisted for best interviewer in 2006 and 2017. She was short-listed for the 2017 Orwell Prize. Turner won the 2020 Orwell Prize for Journalism. She won "Interviewer of the Year – Broadsheet" at the 2020 Press Awards. She won Comment Journalist of the Year at the 2018 British Journalism Awards.

In 2016, Turner won the award "A Woman's Voice" in the Editorial Intelligence awards which she declined with the following statement:

'Man is defined as a human being and a woman as a female.' Simone de Beauvoir wrote those words in 1949. And in journalism, they are still true. Marina, Rosamund, Mary and I have written about elections, war, Brexit, celebrity, poverty, refugees, sport... But whatever women columnists write, and however well we write it, our words are heard only in a minor key. A woman's voice. I would be letting down the many talented female human beings on British newspapers if I accepted this award.

== Writing about transgender people ==
Turner has been criticised for her writing about transgender people. Her articles on the topic include "Children sacrificed to appease trans lobby", "The battle over gender has turned bloody", and "Trans rapists are a danger in women’s jails". Helen Belcher, co-founder of Trans Media Watch, condemned Turner's columns, arguing that Turner painted trans people as "dangerous sex offenders" and claimed that the Times columns such as Turner's would lead to trans teen suicides. Turner condemned Belcher's comments, calling them "ghastly" and "libelous". The Times defended Turner, writing that "Concerns of biological women must not be silenced".

In 2019, Turner tweeted that trans model and activist Munroe Bergdorf was unfit to be an ambassador for Childline because Bergdorf was a "porn model" who had posed for Playboy. Bergdorf denied ever participating in porn, and stated that it was wrong to demonize persons that do in any case. NSPCC, the owner of Childline, cut ties with Bergdorf due to the controversy.

== Personal life ==
Turner married Ben Preston, executive editor of The Sunday Times, a former editor of the Radio Times, and a former deputy editor of The Times, and the son of Peter Preston, in 1995. The couple have two sons. She lives in Camberwell, south London.
