= Trans-exclusionary radical feminism =

Movement originating within radical feminism

Trans-exclusionary radical feminism, also known as gender-critical feminism, is a subset of feminism that rejects transgender and non-binary identities. Trans-exclusionary radical feminists believe that womanhood is solely defined by sex and that sex is biological, immutable, and binary. They view trans women as men and trans men as women. They consider the concepts of gender identity and gender self-identification to be part of an inherently oppressive "gender ideology", a concept which is shared with the right-wing anti-gender movement.

Emerging from fringe movements within second-wave radical feminism mainly in the United States, trans-exclusionary radical feminism has achieved increasing global prominence in the 2010s and 2020s. It has been linked to promotion of disinformation and to the anti-gender movement. Anti-gender rhetoric has seen increasing circulation in trans-exclusionary radical feminist discourse since 2016, including the concept of "gender ideology". In several countries, trans-exclusionary radical feminist groups have formed alliances with right-wing, far-right, and anti-feminist organisations.

Trans-exclusionary radical feminism has been described as transphobic by feminist and scholarly critics. It is opposed by many feminist, LGBTQ rights, and human rights organizations. The Council of Europe has condemned trans-exclusionary radical feminist ideology, among other ideologies, and linked it to "virulent attacks on the rights of LGBTI people" in Hungary, Poland, Russia, Turkey, the United Kingdom, and other countries. UN Women has described the trans-exclusionary radical feminist movement, among other movements, as extreme anti-rights movements that employ hate propaganda and disinformation.

== Terminology ==
=== Trans-exclusionary radical feminism ===
Trans-inclusive radical feminist blogger Viv Smythe has been credited with popularizing the term "trans-exclusionary radical feminism" in 2008 as an online shorthand. It was used to describe a minority of feminists who espouse sentiments that other feminists consider transphobic, including the rejection of the mainstream feminist view that trans women are women, opposition to transgender rights, and the exclusion of trans women in women's spaces and organizations. Smythe has also been credited with having coined the acronym "TERF", due to a blog post she wrote reacting to the Michigan Womyn's Music Festival's policy of denying admittance to trans women. Though it was created as a deliberately neutral descriptor, "TERF" is now often considered derogatory or dismissive, but may also be used as a self-description.

Serena Bassi and Greta LaFleur write that "the argument by trans-exclusionary radical feminists that the term TERF (an acronym for 'trans-exclusionary radical feminist') is a 'slur'— rather than a description of a particular approach to politics—leans on a 'politics of injury' that distances itself from the real and very harmful work trans-exclusionary radical feminism is doing in the world." Cristan Williams writes in The SAGE Encyclopedia of Trans Studies that "the term has been rhetorically helpful in distinguishing TERF activism from the long-term radical feminist community members who are inclusive of trans women" and that the TERF label is useful, as terms like bigot are, in drawing a sharp distinction between core feminist views and exclusionary beliefs that many feminists find harmful.

=== Gender-critical feminism ===
Since the 2010s, there has been a shift among proponents from 'TERF' to 'gender critical feminism', which reflects a shift towards language that obscures their trans-exclusionary focus. Proponents have claimed that despite its neutral origin, the term in practice had been used to "denigrate women's ideas". Because advocates of trans-exclusionary radical feminism advocate the exclusion of trans women from women's spaces, some academics have argued that this shift in language constitutes a problematic rebranding. This change in self-description was accompanied by other shifts in rhetoric, such as "anti-trans" becoming "pro-women" and "trans-exclusion" becoming the protection of "sex-based rights", aimed at cultivating mainstream support by appearing moderate to outsiders.

== History ==
=== Early history (before 2000) ===
Although trans people were active in feminist movements in the 1960s and earlier, the 1970s saw conflict among some early radical feminists over the inclusion of trans women in feminism.

In 1973, trans-exclusionary radical feminist activists from the Daughters of Bilitis voted to expel Beth Elliott, an out trans woman, from the organization. The same year, Elliott was scheduled to perform at the West Coast Lesbian Conference, which she had helped organize; a group of trans-exclusionary radical feminist activists calling themselves the Gutter Dykes leafletted the conference protesting her inclusion and keynote speaker Robin Morgan updated her speech to describe Elliott as "an opportunist, an infiltrator, and a destroyer – with the mentality of a rapist". An impromptu vote was held with the majority supporting her inclusion in the conference; when Elliott subsequently entered the stage to perform the Gutter Dykes rushed to the stage to attack her and attacked performers Robin Tyler and Patty Harrison who had stepped in to defend her.

At the 1973 Christopher Street Liberation Day rally, trans-exclusionary radical feminists tried to stop Sylvia Rivera from speaking. Jean O'Leary publicly denounced Sylvia Rivera as "parodying womanhood" and Lesbian Feminist Liberation distributed flyers seeking to keep "female impersonators" off the stage.

Trans-exclusionary radical feminist activists protested Sandy Stone's position at Olivia Records, a trans-inclusive lesbian separatist music collective. In 1977 The Gorgons, a trans-exclusionary lesbian separatist paramilitary group, issued a death threat to Stone and came to the event armed though were intercepted by security. Escalating threats against the collective motivated Stone to leave the group.

Janice Raymond's The Transsexual Empire, published in 1979, examined what she considered to be the role of transgender identity in reinforcing traditional gender stereotypes, in particular the ways in which the "medical-psychiatric complex" was medicalizing gender identity, and the social and political context that contributed to the image of gender-affirming treatment and surgery as therapeutic medicine. Raymond maintained that this was based in the "patriarchal myths" of "male mothering", and "making of woman according to man's image", and that transgender identity aimed "to colonize feminist identification, culture, politics and sexuality". The book goes on to say that "All transsexuals rape women's bodies by reducing the real female form to an artifact" and that "the problem of transsexualism would best be served by morally mandating it out of existence". Several authors have since characterized this work as transphobic and constituting hate speech, as well as lacking any serious intellectual basis.

In 1991 Nancy Burkholder, a trans woman, was ejected from the Michigan Womyn's Music Festival (MWMF), after refusing to answer when another woman asked her whether or not she was transgender. This removal was justified by the retroactive instatement of a womyn-born womyn policy by the MWMF organisers. For both the 1992 and 1993 MWMF events, Janis Walworth, a cisgender lesbian feminist, organised an educational and outreach program at the MWMF distributing pamphlets titled "Gender Myths". During the 1993 MWMF event, Walworth was told by event security that she and any trans women in their group would be required to leave the event "for their own safety". Although an offer of bodyguard protection was provided by a group of leather lesbians attending the festival, Walworth's group decided instead to set up an outreach camp outside the festival gates. This camp, later known as Camp Trans, continued to provide education and outreach attempts while protesting the festival's trans exclusionary practices until the festival's final event in 2015.

== By country ==
=== Europe ===
==== France ====
In France, the gender-critical or TERF strain of feminism was long understood as less significant or dangerous to trans rights than non-feminist, conservative or religious groups. Journalist Yacha Hajzler described the strain as an extremist minority supported by the political far-right, while Constance Lefebvre dismissed TERFs as a small uninfluential minority of French feminists. However, in the years leading up to 2022, TERFs gained increasing prominence in public discourse. Roux Ange argues that French anti-trans feminism in particular advances a "universalist feminism" that collapses intersectionality.

The French gender-critical feminist movement is closely linked with conservative and far-right movements. Trans-exclusionary feminists Marguerite Stern and Dora Moutot amplify and support anti-trans lobby groups Observatoire de la petite sirène and Ypomoni. Founded in 2021, Little Mermaid Observatory was established by Céline Masson and Caroline Eliacheff to lobby against transgender healthcare for minors.

==== Germany ====
Since 2021, a TERF or gender-critical feminist discourse has developed as an alternative to mainstream feminism in response to the coalition government introducing self-ID legislation. This minority of feminists invokes language of 'biological sex', social contagion and misinformation about transgender violence, citing experiences in the United Kingdom.

==== United Kingdom ====
In the United Kingdom, the anti-transgender movement in the U.K. has been described by scholars as building alliances with right-wing and religious fundamentalist groups that oppose trans rights. In July 2025, Sally Hines argued that the mobilization of these groups popularized a discourse centred around "gender ideology," "institutional capture," and "sex‑based rights," and has gained traction within UK parliamentary politics, the Equalities and Human Rights Commission, and conservative media, often via a small network of actors. Sociologists McLean and Stretesky added that "a veritable miasma of anti-trans campaign groups [...] united in their antipathy toward transgender people" has contributed to an anti-trans moral panic in the United Kingdom. They identified anti-trans groups such as FiLiA, Fair Play for Women, Get the L Out, LGB Alliance, Sex Matters, and Transgender Trend.

Updated Equality and Human Rights Commission guidance stating that single-sex spaces open to the public should be organised based on biological sex and that trans people should use either gender-neutral facilities or the ones that match their biological sex, came into force in August 2026.

=== Asia ===
==== China ====
China's development of a radical feminist movement has emerged in the context of the South Korean radical feminist movement, particularly the 6B4T principles. Chinese radical feminism has largely grown as an online phenomenon, in the context of decreasing freedom of speech and increased repression of feminist activism via NGOs. Developing into a movement on social media, Chinese radical feminists use platforms like Douban and Weibo to 'spread feminism' and bring gender inequality and violence against women into public consciousness. This movement, first focused on promoting women's rights, eventually evolved in opposition to LGBT activism in China. A particular focus on transgender people started around 2020, with trans weightlifter Laurel Hubbard's participation in the 2020 Olympics and global debates over J. K. Rowling's tweets.

==== Japan ====
Concordant with global and Japanese national rises in anti-gender and anti-LGBTQ discourse, there has been an increase in anti-transgender discourses in Japanese online media, which since the 2010s has entered Japanese feminist discourses. The pinnacle of the intensification of transphobia came with the 2018 Ochanomizu University's announcement that it would admit transgender students. Both Anglo-European and Korean TERF contexts have influenced Japanese feminist transphobia, but result from a specific Japanese feminist context.

==== Turkey ====
In Turkey, the division between trans-inclusion and trans-exclusion has a longer historical grounding. Both feminist and trans rights movements have their roots in activism that began after the 1980 military coup. However, trans exclusionary feminism has become more salient within the Turkish feminist movement since 2018. Lara Özlen argues that, rather than a direct import of anti-trans feminisms from the UK, Turkish TERF has to be understood in the context of Turkish feminist history and recent right-wing provocations.

== Views ==
=== Sex and gender ===
Trans-exclusionary radical feminists equate "women" with what they consider to be a "female sex class", and view historical and contemporary oppression of women as being rooted in their being female, while "gender" is a system of social norms which functions to oppress women on the basis of their sex. They believe sex is biological and cannot be changed, and that equity legislation protecting against discrimination based on sex should be interpreted as solely referring to biological sex. Furthermore, trans-exclusionary radical feminist beliefs emphasise the view that sex is binary, as opposed to a continuous spectrum, and that the two sexes have an objective, material basis as opposed to being socially constructed.

Trans-exclusionary radical feminists promote the idea that sex is important. In Material Girls, Kathleen Stock discusses four areas in which she expresses the view that sex-associated differences are important, regardless of gender: medicine, sport, sexual orientation, and the social effects of heterosexuality (such as gender pay gaps and sexual assault). Holly Lawford-Smith states: "Gender critical feminism is not 'about' trans. It is about sex." Lawford-Smith said of gender-critical feminism: "It is about being critical of gender, and this has implications for a wide range of feminist issues, not just gender identity." Writing of her view of a "gender-critical feminist utopia", she said: "While there will still be the same people who think of themselves as 'transmen', 'transwomen' or 'non-binary' today, they will not use those labels, because 'feminine' will be a way that males can be, 'masculine' will be a way that women can be, and 'androgynous' will be a way that anyone can be."

In trans-exclusionary radical feminist discourse, the terms man and woman are used as sex-terms, assigned no more meaning than adult human male and adult human female respectively, in contrast to feminist theorists who argue these terms embody a social category distinct from matters of biology (usually referred to as gender). The phrase adult human female has become a slogan in trans-exclusionary radical feminist politics, and has been described as transphobic.

=== "Sex-based rights" ===
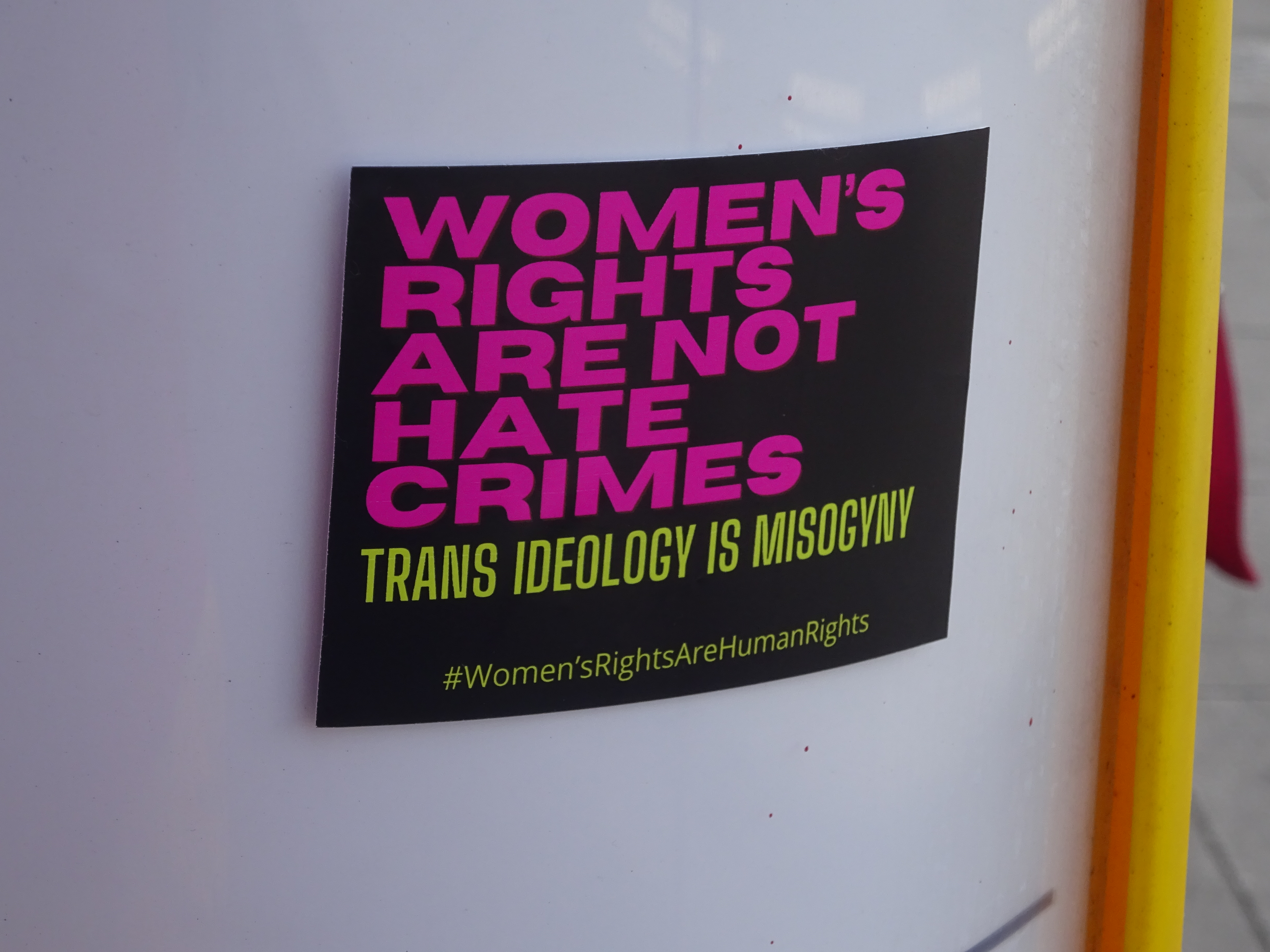
A sticker promoting gender-critical feminism

Trans-exclusionary radical feminists advocate what they call "sex-based rights", arguing that "women's human rights are based upon sex" and that "these rights are being eroded by the promotion of 'gender identity'". They commonly position "sex-based rights" as under attack and something that needs defense, arguing that allowing trans women to use women's spaces is a threat to cisgender women.

Human rights scholar Sandra Duffy described the concept of "sex-based rights" as "a fiction with the pretense of legality", noting that the word "sex" in international human rights law does not share the implications of the word "sex" in trans-exclusionary radical feminist discourse and is widely agreed to also refer to gender. She describes the conflation of "women's rights" with "sex-based rights" as a "linguistic trick" and a move that has "no backing in actual law". Catharine A. MacKinnon noted that "the recognition [that discrimination against trans people is discrimination on the basis of sex, that is gender, the social meaning of sex] does not, contrary to allegations of anti-trans self-identified feminists, endanger women or feminism". Both Duffy and MacKinnon argue that there are no positive or affirmative "sex-based rights" that women possess, but rather negative rights against discrimination.

Inna Michaeli of the NGO Association for Women's Rights in Development argues that 'sex-based rights' are an attempt to construct a patriarchal idea of what a woman is. The term has been adopted by Donald Trump and was used in an executive order titled "Defending Women from Gender Ideology Extremism and Restoring Biological Truth to the Federal Government", which has erased official recognition of transgender people and rolled back their protections.

=== Inclusive language ===
Scholars Lucy Jones and Rodrigo Borba have published work stating that trans-exclusionary radical feminist actors often resist the adoption of inclusive and nonbinary language, particularly in relation to pronouns and the recognition of transgender and nonbinary identities. In her 2023 review of literature on language, gender, and sexuality, Jones says that trans-exclusionary radical feminists frequently reject linguistic practices that affirm trans and nonbinary identities, often citing the preservation of "sex-based rights" as justification. She says that this resistance is typically framed by a binary and essentialist ideology that defines "woman" exclusively as someone assigned female at birth. Drawing on this scholarship, Jones characterizes trans-exclusionary radical feminist resistance to inclusive language as part of a broader "cisnormative preoccupation with trans people's bodies" and a form of linguistic policing aimed at denying the legitimacy of trans and nonbinary identities. Jones situates these discursive patterns within a wider political context by citing Borba (2022), who states that there has been an emergence of an "anti-gender register" used in trans-exclusionary discourse, including trans-exclusionary radical feminism. Borba argues that this register, which draws on essentialist ideas about sex and gender, has gained traction through a process of enregisterment, a way of making certain ideological positions appear natural or commonsensical. He further suggests that this has been achieved in part by appropriating the language of feminist and LGBTQ+ antidiscrimination activism, reframing it to emphasize threats to the rights of cisgender women and children.

Some trans-exclusionary radical feminists such as Holly Lawford-Smith defend misgendering, arguing that rather than being harmful, it is "accurately referring to sex". An essay published by Fair Play For Women compares pronouns to rohypnol, a date rape drug, arguing that using the pronouns preferred by trans people "alters your attention, your speed of processing".

=== Socialisation and gender nonconformity ===
Trans-exclusionary radical feminists generally see gender as a system in which women are oppressed for reasons intrinsically related to their sex, and emphasize male violence against women, particularly involving institutions such as the sex industry, as central to women's oppression. Holders of such views often contend that trans women cannot fully be women because they were assigned male at birth and have experienced some degree of male privilege. Germaine Greer has said that it "wasn't fair" that "a man who has lived for 40 years as a man and had children with a woman and enjoyed the services—the unpaid services of a wife, which most women will never know…then decides that the whole time he's been a woman".

These ideas have been met with criticism from believers in other branches of feminism. Sociologist Patricia Elliot argues that the view that one's socialization as a girl or woman defines "women's experience" assumes that cis women's experiences are homogeneous and discounts the possibility that trans and cis women may share the experience of being disparaged for their perceived femininity. Others argue that expectations of one's assigned sex are something enforced upon them, beginning at early socialization, and transgender youth, especially gender-nonconforming children, often experience different, worse treatment involving reprisals for their deviation therefrom.

Transfeminist Julia Serano has referred to implying that trans women may experience some degree of male privilege pre-transition as "denying [them] the closet", and has compared it to saying that a cisgender gay person experienced straight privilege before coming out. She has also compared it to if a cisgender girl was raised as a boy against her will, and how the two scenarios tend to be viewed differently by a cisgender audience, despite being ostensibly similar experiences from a transfeminine perspective.

=== Gender transition ===
In The Transsexual Empire (1979), feminist Janice Raymond denounces the act of transition as "rape", by virtue of "reducing the real female form to an artifact, appropriating this body for themselves". She stated "the problem of transsexualism would best be served by morally mandating it out of existence" and when later feminist criticism compared her writing to genocidal rhetoric, argued in 2014 that she didn't call for physical eradication but eradication of "the medical and social systems that support transsexualism and the reasons why in a gender-defined society, persons find it necessary to change their bodies".

In her own book Gyn/Ecology (1979), originally published one year earlier, Mary Daly, who had served as Raymond's thesis supervisor, insisted that as sex reassignment surgery could not reproduce female chromosomes, the clitoris, the ability to give birth, the ability to menstruate, or a female life history, it could "not produce women". Sheila Jeffreys and Germaine Greer have made similar remarks. Daly presented gender transition as the result of a grotesque patriarchal urge to violate natural boundaries and imitate motherhood, assimilating it to a broader concept of "male motherhood" that also included the Catholic priesthood, and claimed that it represented a male technological attempt to replace women altogether. She also compared the idea that a trans woman could be a woman despite lacking a clitoris to the ideology behind "African female genital mutilation".

In a response to remarks by Elizabeth Grosz, philosopher Eva Hayward characterized this type of view as telling trans people who have had sex reassignment surgery: "Don't exist."

Helen Joyce has called for "reducing or keeping down the number of people who transition" because every one who does, happy or not, is a person who's "damaged" and "a huge problem to a sane world".

==== Transgender youth ====
Trans-exclusionary feminists raise concerns about or oppose gender-affirming care like puberty blockers or hormone replacement therapy for transgender youth, often citing controversial theories like rapid-onset gender dysphoria. They posit that 'gender identity ideology' constitutes a threat to the safety of children, equating pediatric gender care with bodily mutilation. Feminists like Holly Lawford-Smith and Kathleen Stock cite statistics showing that the number of children referred to gender clinics have increased in the late 2010s, advancing a social contagion argument that authors Fran Amery and Shon Faye describe as a moral panic. They argue that puberty blockers should not be prescribed on the basis that there is little benefit and substantial harm to puberty blockers. Ethicist Rach Cosker-Rowland argues these claims are not supported by an evaluation of the literature on puberty blockers.

=== Intersex conditions ===
Trans-exclusionary radical feminist Germaine Greer called women with XY AIS "men" and "incomplete males" in her 1999 book The Whole Woman. Iain Morland responded that "in trying to criticize the social construction of femaleness and intersex, Greer disenfranchised precisely those people who live at the intersection of the two categories". Greer admitted in 2016 that defining men and women solely using chromosomes was wrong. Later trans-exclusionary radical feminists have disputed the prevalence of intersex conditions, arguing that Anne Fausto-Sterling's estimate of 1.7% comprises mostly cases not normally considered ambiguous "in genitalia or in reproductive organs", like nonclassic CAH, Turner syndrome, or Klinefelter syndrome. Citing research showing much lower prevalence, Kathleen Stock and Holly Lawford-Smith have both argued that the existence of intersex conditions does not impact the usefulness of sex categories, with Lawford-Smith saying that the term "assigned female at birth" has been "appropriated from people with differences of sexual development", and "used by trans activists for everyone, even though in more than 99% of cases, as we have seen, sex is accurately observed, not 'assigned'".

Most intersex organizations subscribe to a mixed sociological perspective of sex and gender, and as trans legislation and subjects overlaps heavily with intersex legislation, intersex people are often involved in trans activism. Intersex women who display a mixed sexual phenotype often face attacks similar to trans people.

=== Sexual orientation ===
Trans-exclusionary radical feminists believe that transgender rights are a threat to the rights of gay people. Trans-exclusionary lesbians and feminists are a minority in the UK: polls show that cisgender lesbians and bisexual women are among the most trans-inclusive groups in Britain.

Kathleen Stock, for instance, has said that allowing trans women to call themselves women "threatens a secure understanding of the concept 'lesbian'". Magdalen Berns, co-founder of the group For Women Scotland, has said that "there is no such thing as a lesbian with a penis" in regards to the idea of some trans women being lesbians.

Julie Bindel has said that transgender women cannot be lesbians, instead qualifying them as straight men trying to "join the club", and has compared transgender activism to men sexually assaulting lesbian women for rejecting their advances.

Many other trans-exclusionary radical feminist groups and pundits have spoken of the transgender rights movement as a men's sexual rights movement, designed to pressure lesbians into having sex with trans women.

Ray Blanchard's theory of autogynephilia is a recurrent talking point in TERF discourse, where it is usually presented as established science. It characterises trans women's gender identities as caused by sexual orientation or sexual deviance. The theory has never received wide acceptance in sexology or psychology.

=== Conversion therapy ===
Kathleen Stock has argued that definitions of conversion therapy and bans against it should not include gender identity conversion therapy on the basis that it risks criminalising "proper therapeutic exploration", and that she believes it comes into conflict with bans against sexual orientation conversion therapy. This latter argument has been criticized on the basis that doctors affirming transgender youth do not attempt to alter sexual orientation, which is understood to define who they are attracted to, and respect the person's expressed gender identity and sexual orientation. Trans-exclusionary radical feminist campaign groups in the United Kingdom such as Sex Matters have described the provision of gender-affirming care for transgender youth as "modern conversion therapy" which erases gay identities and argued it should be criminalized. Trans-exclusionary radical feminists in France campaigned against a ban on conversion therapy arguing that most transgender teenagers assigned female at birth aren't really trans.

In March 2022, trans-exclusionary radical feminist groups campaigned to have the UK government remove gender identity change efforts from a proposed ban on conversion therapy.

The Trevor Project and International Lesbian, Gay, Bisexual, Trans and Intersex Association have stated "gender critical therapy" is another name for conversion therapy. Heron Greenesmith has reported on trans-exclusionary radical feminist boards sharing lists of therapists whose end goal is the rejection of trans identity for parents of trans youth. The trans-exclusionary radical feminist group Genspect promotes "gender exploratory therapy", which is also considered to be a form of conversion therapy. They argue that transgender identities stem from unprocessed trauma, childhood abuse, internalized homophobia or misogyny, sexual fetishism, and autism.

== Analysis ==
=== Scholarly analysis ===
In 2025, philosopher Suzy Killmister published "What’s Wrong with Gender-Critical Feminism?" in Hypatia, arguing that the metaphysical and political assumptions of gender-critical feminism make it both philosophically flawed and, if enacted, it would bring about a world of two sex classes that shape roles and access in the world. Killmister contends that by reinforcing biological essentialism and opposing trans inclusion, gender-critical feminism contributes to the same social hierarchies and exclusionary politics promoted by neo-Nazi actors.

Clair Thurlow notes that the more explicitly hateful language used by early trans-exclusionary radical feminists failed to gain support, forcing them to pivot towards euphemisms and dog-whistles such as using "pro-woman" to mean "anti-trans", "protecting sex-based rights" meant excluding trans people, and "trans-exclusionary radical feminism" became "gender-critical feminism". This allowed trans-exclusionary feminism to appear reasonable to the average person while maintaining their anti-trans meanings to other anti-trans activists.

Researcher Aleardo Zanghellini argues that "gender-critical feminism advocates reserving women's spaces for cis women" as well as that "Many problems in gender-critical thought are consistent with the explanation that paranoid structuralism is too often presupposed in gender-critical work".

Mauro Cabral Grinspan, Ilana Eloit, David Paternotte and Mieke Verloo criticize the expression "gender-critical feminism" and argue that the term is problematic because it serves to rebrand anti-trans activism.

Abbie E. Goldberg argues that "trans-exclusionary radical feminism (TERF) has contained similar cisnormative arguments to those of social conservatives, promoting vilification of people with a trans lived experience in the guise of so-called gender-critical feminism" and that "this TERF approach has been used to promote exclusionary and discriminatory legislation, such as prohibiting equal access to public toilets and the right to be treated in accordance with one's gender in workplaces, accommodations, and public venues".

In a systematic review of TERF behaviour online, Nina Ploch found that TERFs exhibit similar group dynamics to conservative and authoritarian groups. These include a strong emphasis on group cohesion, rigid gender binaries, and the portrayal of trans individuals as an external threat, aligning with psychological traits such as ethnocentrism and social dominance. Ploch noted that TERFs "show little openness to change, seek structure and order, and justify inequalities to cope with uncertainty and threat," further demonstrating "features of authoritarianism." According to her analysis, TERFs also tend to "operate within narrow circles of like-minded individuals" and are often "convinced of their moral superiority."

James Pickles and Ben Colliver argue that self-styled "gender critical" actors contribute to a wider social environment in which transphobic prejudice is normalised, shaping public attitudes and enabling increased hate-crime perpetration and structural harms against trans communities.

=== Relationship with feminism ===
Gender studies scholars Serena Bassi and Greta LaFleur have noted that TERFism started out as a fringe group among English speaking cultural feminists in the 1970s that grew rapidly due to media exposure.

Cristan Williams notes that radical feminism has historically been predominantly trans-inclusive and considers trans-exclusionary views a minority or fringe view within radical feminism.

Carrera-Fernández and DePalma argued that "the increasingly belligerent popular discourses promoted by TERF groups since the 1970s [are] appropriating feminist discourses to produce arguments that contradict basic premises of feminism".

Henry F. Fradella said that most contemporary feminists are supportive of trans people, and that trans-exclusionary radical feminists are a small but vocal group who believe that trans rights threaten the rights of cis women. Most trans-exclusionary radical feminist arguments for this belief, he says, are false, and "misconstrue or ignore empirical data from both the natural and social sciences". Trans-exclusionary radical feminism risks legal equality and contributes to criminalization of trans people.

Briar Dickey writes that the "TERF movement [is] largely understood as taking influence from fringe segments of second-wave radical feminist thought, to which such sex essentialism is inherent, as well as the attachment of violence to male bodies." Yet Dickey argues that "the contextualisation of contemporary TERF discourse as an extension and evolution of fringe second-wave feminism [...] neglects its relationship to a wider international wave of anti-transgender sentiment" anchored in conservative and religious movements.

Lesbian studies scholars Carly Thomsen and Laurie Essig note that "transness has been and is the object of deep hostility within some marginalized forms of feminism. Skepticism among earlier anti-trans feminists, such as Janice Raymond, about trans women being "real" women has morphed into J.K. Rowling's Twitter feed where she has insisted that trans women are not women. These ideas are, of course, deplorable, but they are also quite fringe within feminist studies and activism in the US".

In July 2018, Sally Hines, a University of Leeds professor of sociology and gender studies scholar, wrote in The Economist that feminism and trans rights have been falsely portrayed as being in conflict by a minority of anti-transgender feminists, who often "reinforce the extremely offensive trope of the trans woman as a man in drag who is a danger to women". Hines criticized these feminists for fueling "rhetoric of paranoia and hyperbole" against trans people, saying that they abandon or undermine feminist principles in their anti-trans narratives, such as bodily autonomy and self-determination of gender, and employ "reductive models of biology and restrictive understandings of the distinction between sex and gender" in defense of such narratives. She concluded with a call for explicit recognition of anti-transgender feminism as a violation of equality and dignity, and "a doctrine that runs counter to the ability to fulfill a liveable life or, often, a life at all".

=== Relationship with the anti-gender movement ===
Bassi and LaFleur write that "the trans-exclusionary feminist (TERF) movement and the so-called anti-gender movement are only rarely distinguished as movements with distinct constitutions and aims". Pearce et al. note that the concept of "gender ideology" "saw increasing circulation in trans-exclusionary radical feminist discourse" from around 2016. Claire House noted in 2023 that "key streams within trans exclusionary women's and feminist movements increasingly engage in collaborative action with right-wing populist-centered anti-gender coalitions, which include right-wing religious, conservative, and right-wing extremist actors". Claire Thurlow writes that "despite efforts to obscure the point, gender critical feminism continues to rely on transphobic tropes, moral panics and essentialist understandings of men and women. These factors also continue to link trans-exclusionary feminism to anti-feminist reactionary politics and other 'anti-gender' movements".

UN Women has described the gender-critical, anti-gender and men's rights movements as anti-rights movements that overlap in opposition to what they describe as "gender ideology", which the agency described as "a term used to oppose the concept of gender, women's rights, and the rights of LGBTIQ+ people broadly." They argued these groups have attempted to "frame equality for women and LGBTIQ+ people as a threat to so-called 'traditional' family values" and linked them to "hateful propaganda and disinformation to target and attempt to delegitimize people with diverse sexual orientations, gender identities, gender expressions, and sex characteristics."

=== Political alliances with conservatives and the far right ===
Some trans-exclusionary radical feminists have allied with conservative or far-right groups and politicians who oppose legislation that would expand transgender rights in the United States. According to der Freitag: "TERF positions are now mostly heard from conservatives and right-wing extremists."

Feminist philosopher Judith Butler has described the anti-gender movements as fascist trends and cautioned self-declared feminists from allying with such movements in targeting trans, non-binary, and genderqueer people. Butler said that "it is painful to see that Trump's position that gender should be defined by biological sex, and that the evangelical and right-wing Catholic effort to purge 'gender' from education and public policy accords with the trans-exclusionary radical feminists' return to biological essentialism". Sophia Siddiqui, the deputy editor of Race & Class, has argued that "'gender critical' feminists play into the hands of far-right street forces and extreme-right electoral parties which would like to abolish anti-discrimination protections altogether" and that it "could have a damaging effect on global feminist and LGBT movements by reinforcing conservative ideas about gender and sexuality". The Canadian Anti-Hate Network said that despite labelling themselves as feminists, TERF groups often collaborate with conservative and far-right groups. Serena Bassi and Greta LaFleur note that "gender-critical movements often reemploy the well-known right-wing populist opposition between 'the corrupt global elites' and 'the people'", noting the similarity of gender-critical beliefs to "far-right conspiracy theorizing". In a direct response to Butler, Sarah Lambert cautioned against conflating gender-critical feminism and right-wing politics or neo-fascism, arguing that some trans-exclusionary radical feminist groups in Britain "align openly with the far-right", that "other prominent advocates hold left-wing or liberal positions", and that some groups are non-partisan. According to Korolczuk et al., most scholars seem to agree that gender-critical feminism "is also implicated in right-wing or even fascist trends".

Gender studies scholar C. Libby has pointed to "burgeoning connections between trans-exclusionary radical feminism, "gender critical" writing, and transphobic evangelical Christian rhetoric".

In January 2019, The Heritage Foundation, an American conservative think tank, hosted a panel of self-described radical feminists opposed to the US Equality Act. Heron Greenesmith of Political Research Associates, an American liberal think tank, has said that the latest iteration of collaboration between conservatives and anti-transgender feminists is in part a reaction to the trans community's "incredible gains" in civil rights and visibility, and that anti-trans feminists and conservatives capitalize on a "scarcity mindset rhetoric" whereby civil rights are portrayed as a limited commodity and must be prioritized to cisgender women over other groups. Greenesmith compared this rhetoric to the right-wing tactic of prioritizing the rights of citizens over non-citizens and white people over people of colour. Bev Jackson, one of the founders of the LGB Alliance, has argued in contrast that "working with The Heritage Foundation is sometimes the only possible course of action" since "the leftwing silence on gender in the US is even worse than in the UK".

In a 2020 article in Lambda Nordica, Erika Alm of the University of Gothenburg and Elisabeth L. Engebretsen of the University of Stavanger, said that there was "growing convergence, and sometimes conscious alliances, between "gender-critical" feminists (sometimes known as TERFs – Trans-Exclusionary Radical Feminists), religious and social conservatives, as well as right-wing politics and even neo-Nazi and fascist movements" and that the convergence was linked to "their reliance on an essentialised and binary understanding of sex and/or gender, often termed 'bio-essentialism'". Engebretsen has described the movement as a "complex threat to democracy". Another 2020 article, in The Sociological Review, said that "the language of 'gender ideology' originates in anti-feminist and anti-trans discourses among right-wing Christians, with the Catholic Church acting as a major nucleating agent", and said that the term "saw increasing circulation in trans-exclusionary radical feminist discourse" from around 2016. It further said that "a growing number of anti-trans campaigners associated with radical feminist movements have openly aligned themselves with anti-feminist organisations".

In a 2021 paper in Signs: Journal of Women in Culture and Society, Hil Malatino of Pennsylvania State University said that "'gender-critical' feminism" in the US has "begun to build coalition with the evangelical Right around the legal codification of sex as a biological binary" and that "popular news media frames transphobia as part of a rational, enlightened, pragmatic response to what is variously called the 'trans lobby' and the 'cult of trans'". Another 2021 paper, in Law and Social Inquiry, said that "a coalition of Christian conservative legal organizations, conservative foundations, Trump administration officials, Republican party lawmakers, and trans-exclusionary radical feminists has assembled to redefine the right to privacy in service of anti-transgender politics" and that "social conservatives have cast the issue as one of balancing two competing rights claims rather than one of outright animus against a gender minority population".

=== Misinformation and disinformation ===
Political communication scholar TJ Billard has argued that "misinformation—or, more specifically, disinformation—about trans topics has become the defining feature of public discourse on transgender rights." Cilia Williams et al. noted in an article on trans-exclusionary radical feminist discourse in Spain that "anti-trans narratives online [...] use attacks, misinformation, and self-defence as a communication strategy, rather than debate or dialogue." Gender theorist Alyosxa Tudor has written that "strategic disinformation as [an] accelerator" has been used to push forward "hateful and anti-democratic agendas."

=== Symbolism and iconography ===
The colors purple, green, and white, originally associated with the British women's suffrage movement, have been adopted by many trans-exclusionary radical feminist groups. Sarah Pedersen writes that "use of suffragette pen names and WSPU colours allows trans-exclusionary radical feminist posters to identify each other both on and offline." These colors are frequently used in logos, promotional material, and online bios, often evoking a sense of historical feminist legitimacy. However, this color scheme has increasingly been criticized as a visual marker for trans-exclusionary ideologies.

== Controversies ==
=== Academic freedom ===
Conflict between gender-critical feminists and other feminists and transgender rights activists has resulted in controversies in which the principles of academic freedom have been invoked. Conflicts have erupted at university campuses.

In July 2025, Alice Sullivan, a gender-critical feminist and professor of sociology, published a report commissioned by the previous Conservative government, accusing UK universities of failing to protect gender-critical academics from bullying and research restrictions. Multiple cases were cited in the report and have been described in the media in which academics engaged in gender critical research have claimed unfair treatment.

=== Conflicts with other feminist and pro-equality groups ===
In February 2020, 28 feminist and LGBT groups in France co-signed a declaration titled Toutes des femmes denouncing trans-exclusionary feminism, saying that "questions disguised as 'legitimate concerns' quickly give way to more violent attacks" and that "it is a confusionist and conspiratorial ideological movement using the cover of feminism to disrupt real feminist fights". The declaration has since also been signed by over 100 additional feminist, LGBT, and progressive groups. In May 2021, over 110 women's and human rights organisations in Canada signed a statement stating that they "vehemently reject the dangerous and bigoted rhetoric and ideology espoused by Trans Exclusionary Radical 'Feminists' (TERFs)", and saying that "trans people are a driving force in our feminist movements and make incredible contributions across all facets of our society".

Judith Butler said in 2020 that trans-exclusionary radical feminism is "a fringe movement that is seeking to speak in the name of the mainstream, and that our responsibility is to refuse to let that happen".

In 2021, the Council of Europe Committee on Equality and Non-Discrimination published a report titled Combating rising hate against LGBTI people in Europe, which condemned "the highly prejudicial anti-gender, gender-critical and anti-trans narratives which reduce the fight for the equality of LGBTI people to what these movements deliberately mischaracterise as 'gender ideology' or 'LGBTI ideology'" and which said there was "a direct link between heteronormativity and heterosexism, on the one hand, and the growing anti-gender and gender-critical movements". The report formed the basis of Resolution 2417, adopted in January 2022.

In late-January 2018, over 1000 Irish feminists, including several groups such as the University College Dublin Centre of Gender, Feminisms & Sexualities, signed an open letter condemning a planned meeting in Ireland on UK Gender Recognition Act reforms organised by a British group opposing the reforms. The letter stated that "[t]rans people and particularly trans women are an inextricable part of our feminist community" and accused the British group of colonialism.

Sociologist Kelsy Burke argued that "TERFs aren't aligned with most feminists" and wrote that "most American feminists are far from trans-exclusionary and have long been among the most supportive groups of LGBTQ equality".

=== Social media and harassment ===
The controversial Reddit community r/GenderCritical gathered a reputation as an anti-trans space. In June 2020, it was banned for violating new rules against "promoting hate". Members set up a similar community called Ovarit.

The trans-exclusionary radical feminist movement has been linked to the harassment and doxxing of trans people and their allies, particularly on social media. A 2025 study in Crime, Media, Culture analyzed posts on X (formerly Twitter) and found that transphobic hate speech and doxxing from the self-described gender-critical movement increased dramatically following X's change of ownership in 2022. According to The Atlantic, trans-exclusionary feminists have harassed trans women over social media, calling them names such as "predators" and "pedophiles" and threatening violence to "resist" them. In 2023, a woman was filmed declaring "I am a TERF" and allegedly verbally assaulting a trans woman at a Cheesecake Factory with insults and threats of violence.

== See also ==
- 21st-century anti-trans movement in the United Kingdom
- Anti-gender movement
- Anti-LGBT rhetoric
- Cultural feminism
- Divide and conquer
- Feminist movements and ideologies
- Feminist sex wars
- Feminist theory
- Feminist views on transgender topics
- Intersectionality
- Intersex
- Gender essentialism
- Lesbian erasure in relation to transgender women
- LGB Alliance
- Party of Women
- Radical feminist views on transgender topics
- Reactionary feminism
- Sex-gender distinction
- Scapegoating
- Social construction of gender
- Sociology of gender
- TERF (acronym)
- Transmisogyny
- Transphobia § In feminism
- Violence against transgender people
- Wedge issue
- White feminism
- Womyn-born womyn
