= Beth Elliott =

Transgender activist, singer, author

Beth Elliot
- Born: November 26, 1950 (age 75); Vallejo, California, U.S.
- Organization(s): Daughters of Bilitis, West Coast Lesbian Conference

Beth Elliott (born 26 November 1950) is an American folk singer, activist, and writer. In the early 1970s, Elliot was involved with the Daughters of Bilitis and the West Coast Lesbian Conference in California. She became the centre of a controversy when a minority of attendees in the 1973 Conference, including a keynote speaker, called for her removal because of her trans status.

== Early life ==
Elliott was born on November 26, 1950, in Vallejo, California. She was raised Catholic and is of Italian, Irish, and French Huguenot descent. Elliott stated that she started to have feelings of gender dysphoria when she was a child and began transitioning in her late teens.

== Career ==
Beth Elliott has been publishing since the mid-1970s on bisexuality, feminism, the AIDS movement, sex positivity, and transness. Additionally, Elliott is the author of several books published by ENC Press. Her 1996 memoir, Mirrors: Portrait of a Lesbian Transsexual, was described as a “classic in lesbian feminist and transgender/transsexual literary history” by the Bay Area Reporter. She revisited the book in 2011, adding a new introduction and afterword as well as a chapter recounting her experience at the West Coast Lesbian Conference. She is also the author of the science fiction novel Don’t Call it “Virtual” published in 2003.

She has been involved in political work in support of gay rights and co-founded the Alice B. Toklas LGBT Club. She was elected as a board member for the California Committee for Sexual Law Reform which, in 1975, supported Willie Brown to pass legislation repealing anti-gay sodomy laws in California.

She has been a folk musician since the late 1960s and was active in the Haight-Ashbury hippie music scene in the 1970s. Her album entitled Buried Treasure was released independently in 2005.

=== Daughters of Bilitis ===
Elliot served as vice-president of the San Francisco chapter of the lesbian political group Daughters of Bilitis from 1971 to 1972, during which she served as editor of the chapter's newsletter, Sisters. When she first joined in 1971, her right to join was debated because of her assigned sex. The organization was split and eventually voted 35 to 29 against the inclusion of trans women in the San Francisco chapter of the DOB; When the vote was announced, the editorial staff of Sisters left the organization in solidarity with Elliott. Her college friend and member of the lesbian separatist Gutter Dykes Collective publicly accused her of sexually harassing her years earlier, which Elliott has denied, claiming she had made false accusations to save face with her group when it was revealed they were acquainted.

=== West Coast Lesbian Conference ===
Beth Elliott continued her involvement in the women's movement and helped to create the West Coast Lesbian Conference which took place in April 1973. She was on the organization committee and was asked to perform as a singer in the conference's entertainment program. However, she met opposition when she took the stage on the first night. Lesbian separatist group The Gutter Dykes had leafleted in protest of Elliott's presence, claiming she was a man, and approached the stage with hostility. Other performers including Jeanne Cordova, Robin Tyler, and Patty Harrison, responded by defending Elliott and establishing the need for a vote on whether Elliott's performance should continue. It took over an hour to count the roughly 1,300 attendees and resulted in a reported two-thirds in favor of Elliott's performance. Some accounts state 3:1 in Elliott's favor while others state it as a bare majority. Elliott gave a brief performance and went on to leave the conference. The following day, keynote speaker Robin Morgan gave her address, which she had altered after the events of the previous night. In the speech, titled "Lesbianism and Feminism: Synonyms or Contradictions?" Morgan referred to Elliott as a "gatecrashing...male transvestite" and, using male pronouns, charged her as "an opportunist, an infiltrator, and a destroyer—with the mentality of a rapist."

=== Post-conference ===
The incident at the West Coast Lesbian Conference left a lasting impression; Elliott was emotionally and socially scarred, and the words defaming her circulated among grassroots lesbian networks and began the 'transsexual rapist' trope. The event was the first time many feminists encountered the question of trans women's inclusion in the movement. Elliott was left ostracized from much of the women's and lesbian community due to this division emerging among feminists, including the derailment of her career in the women's music scene.
