= Kohl: A Journal for Body and Gender Research =

Kohl
- Discipline: Gender studies
- Language: Arabic, English, French
- Edited by: Ghiwa Sayegh

Publication details
- Publisher: Intersectional Knowledge Publishers
- Open access: Yes

Standard abbreviations
- ISO 4: Kohl

Indexing
- ISSN: 1997-5201

Links
- Journal homepage

Kohl: a Journal for Body and Gender Research (frequently: Kohl Journal; Arabic: كُحْل: مجلّة لأبحاث الجسد والجندر) is a biannual journal for feminist and queer research in the Middle East, South West Asia, and North Africa regions. The journal is a peer-reviewed Open Access academic journal. Each edition of Kohl is published in two versions: one in Arabic, and another in English and French. The journal publishes papers, opinion pieces, commentaries, conversations, interviews and literary contributions.

The journal also organizes conferences, such as Decolonizing Knowledge around Gender and Sexuality in collaboration with CTDC in 2018 at Birkbeck University in London and the Alternative Economies Conference in 2019 in Beirut.

The journal is based in Beirut and Paris. It is published by Intersectional Knowledge Publishers.

== History ==
The journal was founded by Ghiwa Sayegh, a queer feminist writer, publisher, and archivist from Lebanon. The first issue was published in the summer of 2015 with the subject “Rethinking Intersections: A MENA-centered Definition of Gender and Sexuality.” Since then, themed issues have been published twice a year on topics such as “Sex, Desire, and Intimacy” (2017), “Centralizing Reproductive Justice” (2019), and others.

From 2015 to 2021, the journal was published in collaboration with the Beirut office of the Heinrich Böll Foundation. Following the virtual festival Crear | Résister | Transform, Kohl and the Association for Women's Rights in Development published a journal on the topic of “Transnational Embodiments” in 2022.

== Editorial focus ==
Based on the observation that literary, academic, and journalistic output on gender, feminism, and sexuality in the Greater Middle East is too often biased by the Orientalist preconceptions of contributors, Kohl aims to promote the dissemination of independent research that is non-exoticizing and attentive to local and regional contexts.
