= Henry F. Fradella =

American lawyer and criminologist

- Alma mater: Arizona State University; George Washington University; George Washington University; Clark University
- Employer: Arizona State University (2014–); California State University, Long Beach (2007–2014); The College of New Jersey (1997–2007); United States District Court for the District of Arizona (1993–1994)

Henry ("Hank") F. Fradella is an American lawyer and criminologist who is a Professor in and Director of the School of Interdisciplinary Forensics at Arizona State University, where he also hold appointments as a Professor in ASU’s School of Criminology and Criminal Justice, and as an Affiliate Professor of Law at Arizona State University’s Sandra Day O’Connor College of Law.

== Biography ==
He earned a B.A. in psychology at Clark University in 1990, an M.F.S in forensic science and a J.D., both at the George Washington University in 1993, and a Ph.D. in justice studies at Arizona State University in 1997. Prior to entering academe, Fradella worked in both the private and public sectors as autopsy technician, a lawyer, and a judicial law clerk for the U.S. District Court for the District of Arizona. He then spent 10 years holding faculty appointments of increasing rank at The College of New Jersey before becoming chair of the Department of Criminal Justice at California State University, Long Beach. He joined Arizona State University in 2014.

His research focuses on the historical development of procedural, substantive, and evidentiary criminal law, legal decision-making, law's effects on human behavior, and the sources and consequences of changes in legal institutions and processes. He has authored or edited 15 books, and over 135 articles. He has been president of the Western Society of Criminology and editor-in-chief of its journal Criminology, Criminal Justice, Law & Society (2013–2017). Since 2019, Fradella has served as the Editor-in-Chief of Thomson/Reuters’ law journal, the Criminal Law Bulletin.

He received the Joseph D. Lohman award in 2014. He also received the Distinguished Faculty Scholarly & Creative Achievement Award at California State University, and was described as "a nationally recognized expert on insanity and diminished capacity defenses and on the evolution of constitutional criminal procedure. The impact of his scholarly activity on law and public policy is evidenced by the numerous courts that have relied on his work."

In 2024 the Western Society of Criminology established the Henry F. Fradella Award in his honor, and he was its first recipient.

== Selected works ==
- LGBTQ+ Issues in Criminology and Criminal Justice, Routledge
- Sexual Privacy and American Law, Academica
- Punishing Poverty: How Bail and Pretrial Detention Fuel Inequalities in the Criminal Justice System, University of California Press
- Stop and Frisk: The Use and Abuse of a Controversial Police Tactic, New York University Press
- Sex, Sexuality, Law, and (In)Justice, Routledge
- Mental Illness and Crime, Sage
- The Foundations of Criminal Justice, Oxford University Press
- Defenses of Excuse in American Law, Academica
