= Holly Lawford-Smith =

Australian author and academic

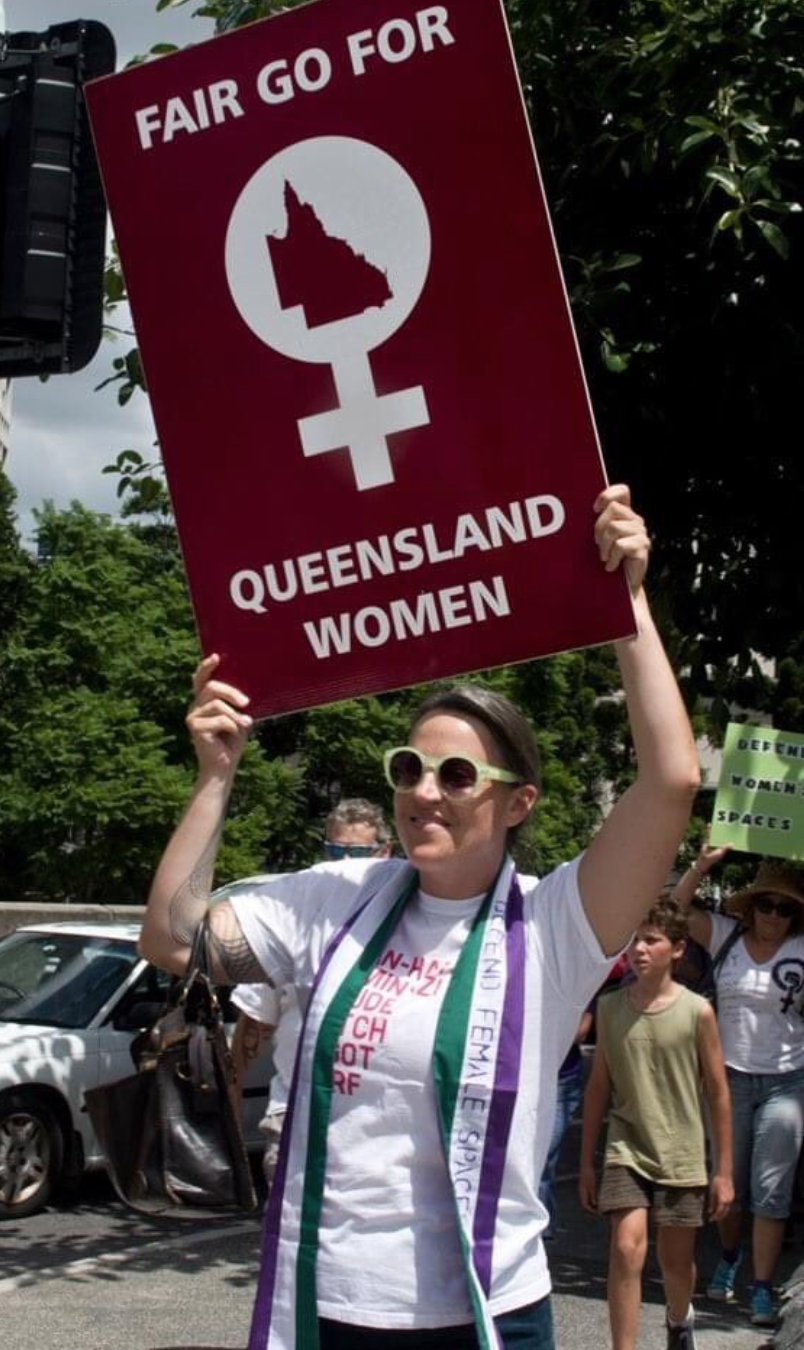
- Born: 1982 (age 43–44); Taupō, New Zealand
- Education: University of Otago, Australian National University
- Scientific career
- Fields: Political philosophy, feminism, climate ethics and sex and gender
- Workplaces: University of Melbourne, University of Sheffield
- Thesis: Feasibility constraints for political theories (2010)
- Website: hollylawford-smith.org

Holly Lawford-Smith is a New Zealand–Australian philosopher and author. She is an associate professor in Political Philosophy, University of Melbourne. Lawford-Smith is widely known for her views on transgender rights and self-professed gender critical views, which have been described as transphobia.

== Early life and education ==
Lawford-Smith was born in Taupō, New Zealand, and completed her BA (Hons) and MA at the University of Otago in Dunedin, New Zealand. She completed a PhD at the Australian National University (ANU) in Canberra in 2010. She then completed post-doctoral scholarships at Centre for Applied Philosophy and Public Ethics CAPPE, Charles Sturt University and then with the School of Philosophy at ANU (2012-2012).

== Career ==
Lawford-Smith then started a permanent job as a lecturer in Philosophy at the University of Sheffield.

Since 2017, Lawford-Smith has worked at the University of Melbourne where she is currently Associate Professor in Political Philosophy in the School of Historical and Philosophical Studies. Lawford-Smith's work is based on social, moral, and political philosophy, with a primary interest in radical feminism and gender critical feminism.

In February 2021, Lawford-Smith launched a website called "No Conflict, They Said" that collects anonymous, unverified stories of the purported impacts of transgender women using women-only spaces. Concerned that the website used isolated and specific (unverified) examples of misconduct to represent transgender women generally as a threat or nuisance, a number of academics from her institution signed an open letter to the University of Melbourne's leadership condemning the website as transphobic, and arguing that it "contravenes the University's Appropriate Workplace Behaviour Policy and raises serious questions about research integrity at the University." In February 2021 The Sydney Morning Herald stated that the site was calling for cis women to share stories about feeling threatened by trans women, that most narratives referred to trans women as "men" and that many of the narratives were about encounters in toilets.

In May 2022, Oxford University Press (OUP) published Lawford-Smith's book, Gender-Critical Feminism, despite petitions objecting to its publication. The OUP responded to these petitions by asserting that Lawford-Smith's book is a work of rigorous scholarship and not merely polemical as the petitions claimed. Gender-Critical Feminism was released in the U.K. on 12 May 2022.

Lawford-Smith is on the editorial board of The Journal of Political Philosophy and Journal of Controversial Ideas. She is also a monthly contributor at Quillette.

== Selected works ==
- Lawford-Smith, Holly (2012). Global Justice. Routledge. ISBN 978-0-7546-2979-5.
- Lawford-Smith, Holly (2019). Not in Their Name: Are Citizens Culpable for Their States' Actions?. Oxford: Oxford University Press. ISBN 978-0-1925-7033-8.
- Lawford-Smith, Holly (2022). Gender-Critical Feminism. Oxford University Press. ISBN 9780198863885.
- Lawford-Smith, Holly (2023). Sex Matters: Essays in Gender-Critical Philosophy. Oxford University Press. ISBN 9780192896131.

== See also ==
- Feminist views on transgender topics
- TERF
