= Association for Women's Rights in Development =

International feminist organization

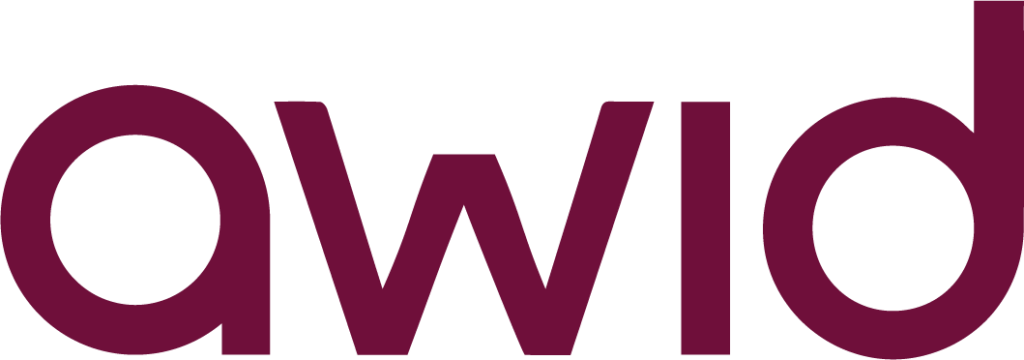
- Abbreviation: AWID
- Founded: 1982; 44 years ago
- Type: Nonprofit
- Purpose: to strengthen women's rights
- Headquarters: Toronto, Canada
- Key people: Veena Singh, Elina Margarita Castillo Jiménez (Presidents); Faye Macheke, Inna Michaeli (Co-Executive Directors)
- Website: Official website

The Association for Women's Rights in Development (AWID), formerly the Association for Women in Development, is an international feminist Nonprofit organization committed to achieving gender equality, sustainable development and women's human rights. It was established in 1982 as a U.S.-based association originally focused on promoting dialogue on women in development issues among academics, policy makers and development professionals, a scope that has since broadened. Among the prominent people who were involved with AWID from the 1980s were pioneering feminist economist Marilyn Waring.

AWID stands for a progressive intersectional feminism and has a broad and inclusive human rights focus, working for marginalized genders and other groups. It coordinates the Observatory on the Universality of Rights (OURs), a collaborative project with over 20 other NGOs including Planned Parenthood, that aims "to monitor, analyse, share information and do collaborative advocacy on [...] anti-rights initiatives threatening international and regional human rights systems" from a feminist perspective.

== Activities ==
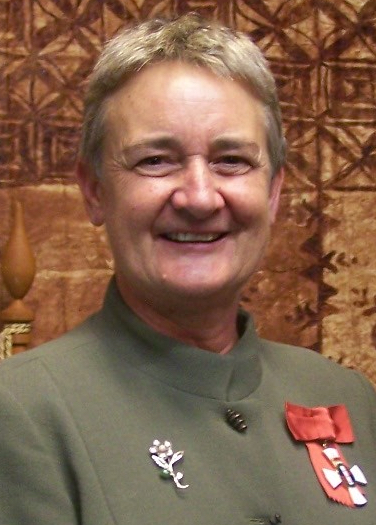
Dame Marilyn Waring, a feminist economist and politician, became involved with AWID in the 1980s and served on its board until 2012

AWID was founded in 1982, toward the end of the United Nations Decade for Women, as a U.S.-based association focused on promoting dialogue on women in development issues among academics, policy makers and development professionals, i.e. staff in the large development organizations.

A network of women and men around the world, AWID members are researchers, academics, students, educators, activists, business people, policy-makers, development practitioners, funders, and more. The former executive director of AWID was Lydia Alpízar Durán, with Myrna Cunningham Kain as board president.

Since the turn of the century AWID worked to become a more global and less US-centric organization, centering voices from the south and voices of marginalized groups. AWID's 2005 forum "We cannot change the world without changing ourselves" challenged the gender binary and centered transgender identities and rights. AWID's 2016 forum in Bahia, Brazil, "Feminist Futures: Building Collective Power for Rights and Justice" featured 1800 participants, many of whom had taken part in the preceding "Black Feminisms Forum".

Since 2016 the organization has been led by Hakima Abbas and Cindy Clark as Co-Executive Directors, with American feminist author Charlotte Bunch joining as board president. Formerly headquartered in Washington, D.C., the organization now has offices in Toronto, Mexico City and Cape Town and staff working across the globe.

A policy brief, Illicit Financial Flows: Why we should claim these resources for gender, economic and social justice, was issued to explain stricter financial regulations which would replace corporate privileges against the people and planet. In that, initial policies to support feminist and gender justice organizations were also recommended to influence relevant decision-making and to involve policy-makers, not limited to mentioning potentially complement bodies as well as those existing engagement and positions.

AWID has received funding from UN Women and its predecessors, several government development agencies and development banks, the Open Society Foundations, the Rockefeller Foundation, the Ford Foundation, the Sigrid Rausing Trust and other organizations. In 2021 AWID received a $15 million donation from progressive philanthropist MacKenzie Scott. In late 2025 AWID received a further $20 million donation from MacKenzie Scott.

A notable member is the feminist economist Dame Marilyn Waring, who became involved with the association upon leaving parliament and who served on its board from 2008 to 2012.

=== Observatory on the Universality of Rights ===
AWID coordinates the Observatory on the Universality of Rights (OURs), a collaborative project with over 20 other NGOs, that aims "to monitor, analyse, share information and do collaborative advocacy on [...] anti-rights initiatives threatening international and regional human rights systems" from a feminist perspective. OURs' working group includes Planned Parenthood, the World Council of Churches, Muslims for Progressive Values and other organizations.

== Focus area ==
AWID works on issues of gender justice and women's human rights worldwide through supporting women's rights advocates, organizations and movements, granted by the Channel Foundation since 2011 with initial travel grant program for the "12th AWID International Forum on Women's Rights and Development: Transforming Economic Power to Advance Women's Rights and Justice" which was held in Istanbul, Turkey, in April 2012. The organization has been focusing its work around five priority areas: Resourcing Women's Rights, Economic Justice, Challenging Religious Fundamentalism, Women Human Rights Defenders, Young Feminist Activism. The global membership with over 7000 members consists of both individual and institutional, coming from 180 countries.

AWID supports LGBTIQ rights and opposes the anti-gender movement, and has described trans-exclusionary feminists as "trojan horses in human rights spaces" that seek to undermine human rights; AWID said that anti-trans activity is "alarming," that "the 'sex-based' rhetoric misuses concepts of sex and gender to push a deeply discriminatory agenda" and that "trans-exclusionary feminists (...) undermine progressions on gender and sexuality and protection of rights of marginalized groups." In 2023 AWID published the open letter "There Is No Place for Anti-Trans Agendas in the UN," endorsed by 550 feminist NGOs.

== Publications ==
- Gallin, Rita S; Spring, Anita (1985). Women creating wealth : transforming economic development : selected papers and speeches from the Association for Women in Development Conference, April 25-27, 1985, Washington, D.C. Proceedings of Association for Women's Rights in Development; Women and social movements, international. Washington, DC: Association for Women's Rights in Development.
- O'Rourke, Nancy; Association for Women in Development, eds. (1991). The future for women in development : voices from the south : proceedings of the Association for Women in Development Colloquium, October 19-20, 1990, Ottawa, Canada [L'avenir des femmes dans le développement] (in English and French). Ottawa, Canada: Colloquium; North-South Institute. ISBN 9780921942283. OCLC 28147631.
- AWIDnews : the newsletter of the Association for Women in Development, Washington: Association for Women in Development, OCLC 33311901 - publication between 1995 and ca.2005
- Barcia, Inmaculada; Penchaszadeh, Analía (2012). Association for Women's Rights in Development (ed.). The insights to strengthen responses for women human rights defenders at risk. Association for Women's Rights in Development.
