= Western Society of Criminology =

American regional learned society

The Western Society of Criminology is an American regional learned society dedicated to research in criminology in the Western United States and Canada. It is based at the School of Criminology, Criminal Justice, & Emergency Management of California State University, Long Beach.

== Overview ==
The organization was established as an independent organization in 1977, though it originated as the "Western Division" of the American Society of Criminology in 1973. It has held an annual meeting since it was founded in 1977.

The society publishes the newsletter The Western Criminologist and the online peer-reviewed journal Criminology, Criminal Justice, Law & Society (formerly Western Criminology Review).
