= Anti-rights movements =

Movements against human rights

Anti-rights movements are movements, groups or campaigns that actively work against the recognition, protection, and advancement of human rights. These movements can target a variety of rights and marginalized groups. They often use misinformation, fear-mongering, and lobbying to undermine legal protections and social acceptance for targeted groups. ODI described anti-rights movements as "a loose coalition of actors [that] has succeeded in stalling progress and undermining rights and freedoms," and that are "well-organised and extremely well-funded compared to progressive rights movements."

UN Women described anti-gender, gender-critical and men's rights movements as examples of anti-rights movements in 2024. Other movements described as anti-rights include anti-immigration and anti-racial equality movements.

The Center for Family and Human Rights has responded that the "anti-rights" label is "part of a larger strategy to delegitimize social conservative voices in multilateral spaces and to redefine civil society to exclude such conservative organizations".

In 2026, Amnesty International published a report suggesting that the UK's Charity Commission review the charitable status of groups it described as "anti-rights", which it then retracted in the face of criticism.

== Examples ==
=== Opposition to LGBTQ rights ===
Opposition to legal rights for lesbian, gay, bisexual, transgender, and queer (LGBTQ) people exists worldwide. Opponents of LGBTQ rights may object to the decriminalization of homosexuality, laws permitting civil unions or partnerships, same-sex parenting and adoption, the inclusion of LGBTQ people in the military, access to assisted reproductive technology, and gender-affirming surgery and hormone therapy for transgender individuals.

Organizations that oppose LGBTQ rights often resist the enactment of laws legalizing same-sex marriage, the passage of anti-discrimination legislation aimed at curbing discrimination against LGBTQ people (including in employment and housing), the adoption of anti-bullying laws to protect LGBTQ minors, the decriminalization of same-gender relationships, and other related laws. These groups are often religious or socially conservative in nature. Such opposition can be motivated by homophobia, transphobia, bigotry, animosity, religion, moral beliefs, political ideologies, or other factors.

According to the Stanford Encyclopedia of Philosophy, "natural law theory offers the most common intellectual defense for differential treatment of gays and lesbians". Dag Øistein Endsjø, a Norwegian scholar and professor of religious studies, and the United Nations Special Rapporteur on Freedom of Religion or Belief, have stated that religious belief underpins most forms of opposition to LGBTQ rights.

==== Anti-gender movement ====
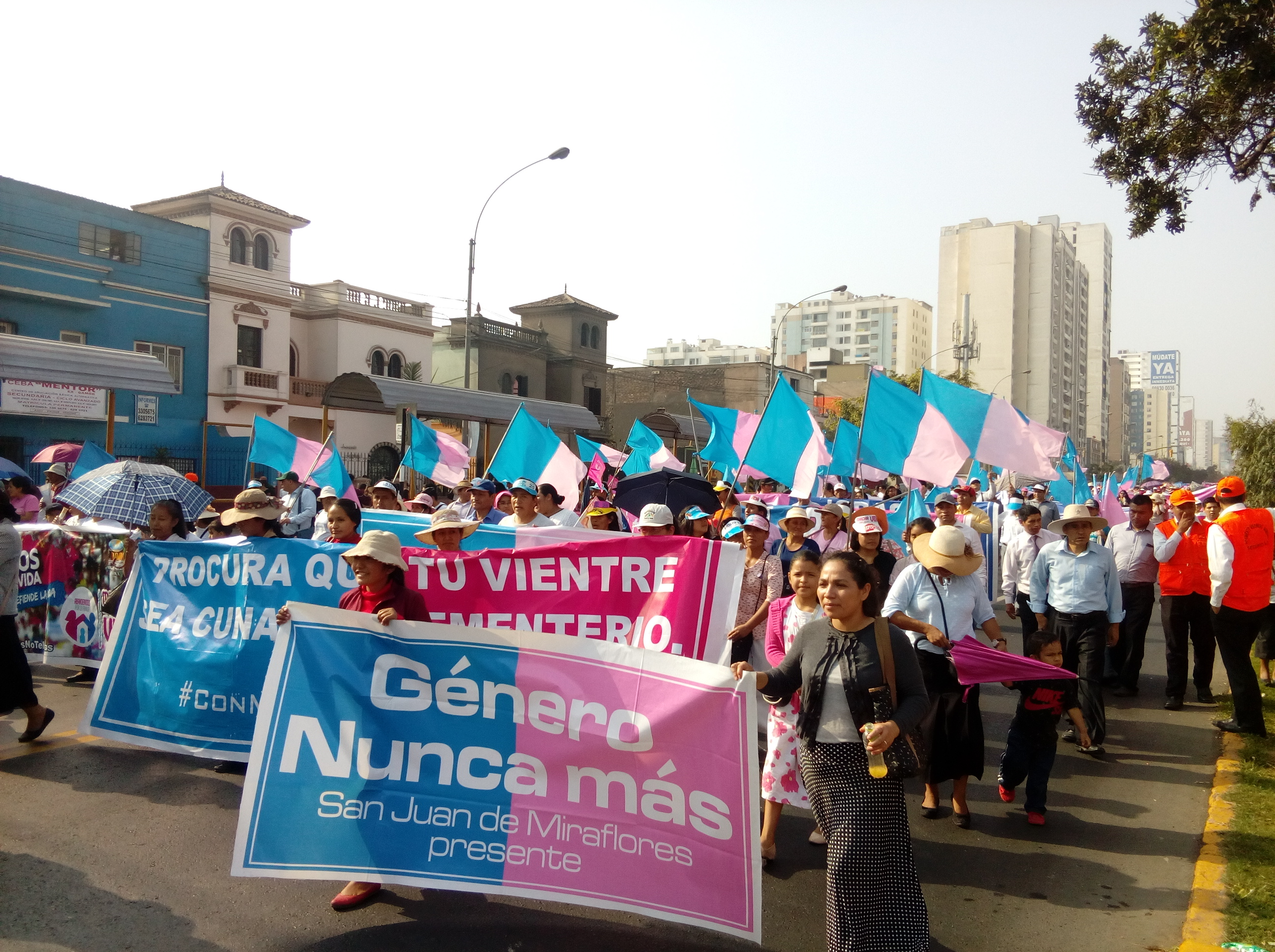
"Gender no more": demonstrators from Con mis hijos no te metas ("Don't mess with my kids") during a pro-life march in Lima, Peru, 2018

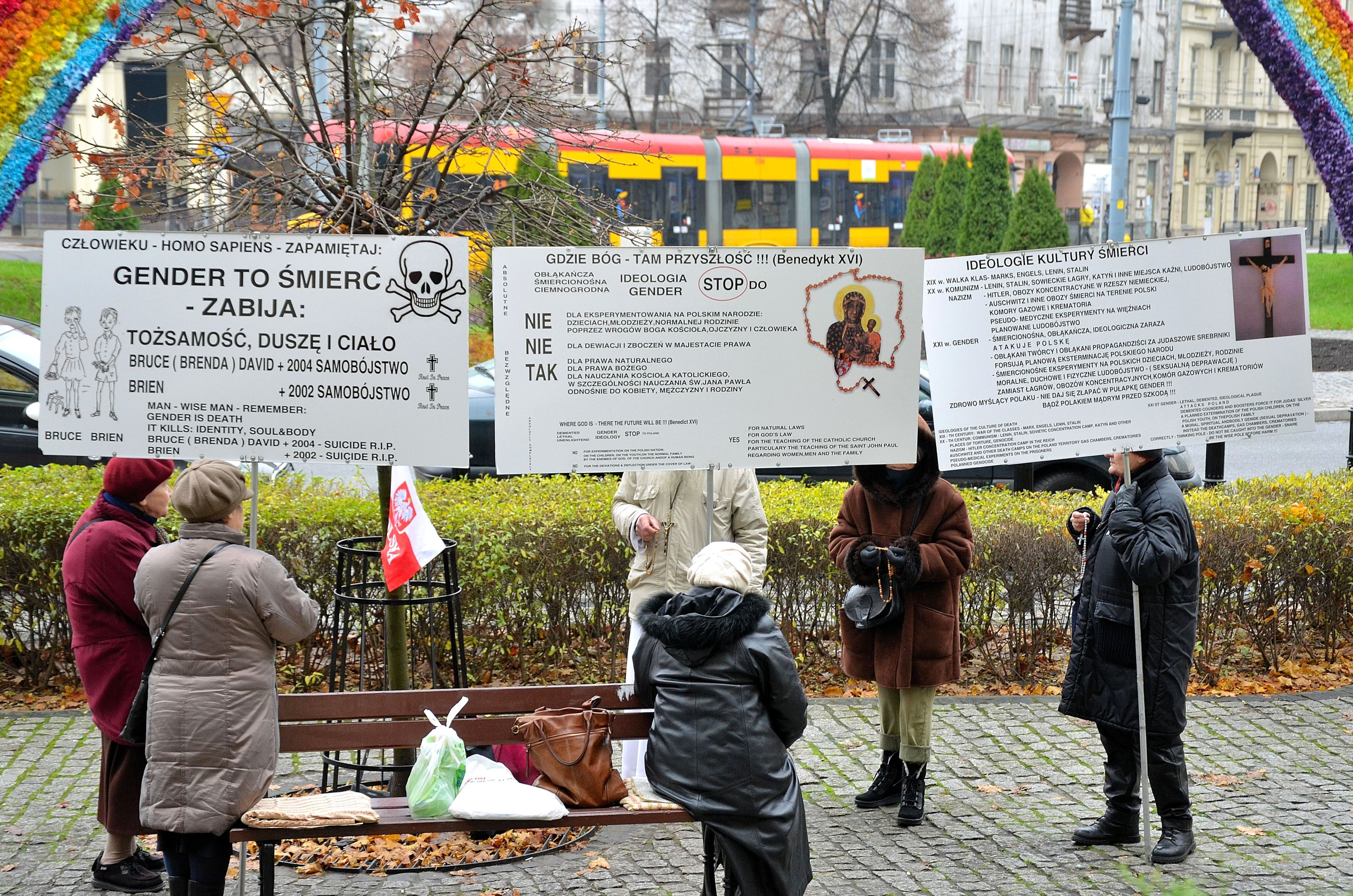
"Gender is death – it kills identity, soul and body": picketing against "gender ideology" in Warsaw, Poland, 2014

The anti-gender movement is a global, mainly right-wing, social movement in opposition to concepts it refers to as "gender ideology" or "gender theory". These terms are loosely defined, and encompass a range of subjects related to feminism and LGBTQ rights, often with opposition to progressivism as a whole. The movement has drawn support from right-wing populist groups, religious conservative organizations, social conservatives, and the far-right worldwide. It views advancement in gender equality and gender and sexual diversity as a threat to traditional family values, religious beliefs, and established social norms.

The movement's beliefs derive from Catholic theology, and its origin can be dated to as early as the 1970s, though it drew greater attention and membership starting in 2012 through public protest. Operating on a transnational scale, the movement engages in political and legislative action targeting various domains, including reproductive rights, inclusive language, same-sex marriage, transgender people, the social constructionist view of gender, and academic disciplines like gender studies. While some parts of the movement focus specifically on opposing LGBTQ rights, others address broader fears about gender-related social changes.

The movement has been criticized for encouraging discrimination, undermining the protection of human rights, and promoting misinformation and rhetoric against LGBTQ people. The notion of a "gender ideology" secretly designed to harm traditional values and social arrangements, of being pervasive, institutionalized, and imposed, has been described as propagandizing moral panic and as exhibiting the characteristics of conspiracy theories.

==== Trans-exclusionary feminism ====
Trans-exclusionary radical feminism, also known as gender-critical feminism, is a subset of feminism that rejects transgender and non-binary identities. Trans-exclusionary radical feminists believe that womanhood is solely defined by sex and that sex is biological, immutable, and binary. They view trans women as men and trans men as women. They consider the concepts of gender identity and gender self-identification to be part of an inherently oppressive "gender ideology", a concept which is shared with the right-wing anti-gender movement.

Emerging from fringe movements within second-wave radical feminism mainly in the United States, trans-exclusionary radical feminism has achieved increasing global prominence in the 2010s and 2020s. It has been linked to promotion of disinformation and to the anti-gender movement. Anti-gender rhetoric has seen increasing circulation in trans-exclusionary radical feminist discourse since 2016, including the concept of "gender ideology". In several countries, trans-exclusionary radical feminist groups have formed alliances with right-wing, far-right, and anti-feminist organisations.

Trans-exclusionary radical feminism has been described as transphobic by feminist and scholarly critics. It is opposed by many feminist, LGBTQ rights, and human rights organizations. The Council of Europe has condemned trans-exclusionary radical feminist ideology, among other ideologies, and linked it to "virulent attacks on the rights of LGBTI people" in Hungary, Poland, Russia, Turkey, the United Kingdom, and other countries. UN Women has described the trans-exclusionary radical feminist movement, among other movements, as extreme anti-rights movements that employ hate propaganda and disinformation.
