= Robin Tyler =

American gay rights activist (born 1942)

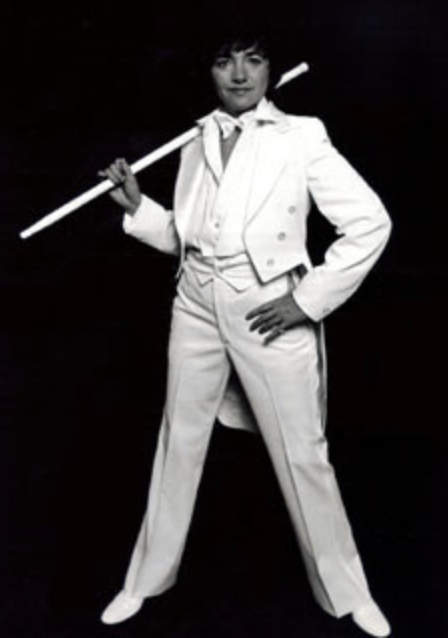
- Born: Arlene Chernick; April 8, 1942 (age 84); Winnipeg, Manitoba, Canada
- Occupations: Comic, producer, and activist
- Known for: Produced the main stages at the first three LGBT Marches on Washington DC, including the historic first national march in 1979. The first out lesbian comic. Successfully sued state of California for gay marriage. Half of comedy duo, Harrison and Tyler.
- Spouse: Diane Olson
- Partner: Pat Harrison
- Website: www.robintyler.com

Robin Tyler (born Arlene Chernick, April 8, 1942) is a Canadian-born American comedian. She was the first lesbian or gay comic to come out on national television, a feminist and pioneer in the grassroots struggle for LGBTQ civil rights and marriage equality in the U.S., and a producer. She emceed and produced the main stage at three marches on Washington for LGBTQ rights, including the historic first National March On Washington for Lesbian and Gay Rights in 1979. Tyler coined the phrase "We are everywhere" as a rallying cry for the LGBTQ community. This became the powerful signature chant of the 1979 march, appearing on banners and posters. The chant "We are everywhere" has continued as a popular rallying cry for LGBTQ equality.

== Early career ==
Tyler arrived in New York City from Manitoba, Canada, in 1962 at 20 years of age. One of her first jobs was in New York City's famous Club 82, a nightclub known for its female impersonators and drag performances. Tyler, in her impersonation of Judy Garland, took this gender performance and "subverted it even further [...] as she was a woman pretending to be a man pretending to be a woman." Tyler was offered the job impersonating Garland after getting caught up in a police raid at one of the city's famous drag balls. Along with the drag queens, she was charged with violations of the infamous "three-item" or "three-article" rule. This informal "rule" was used by NYC police, and police across the country at that time, to target queer people who publicly wore three or more articles of clothing that didn't match their assigned gender. Even despite insisting to police that she was actually female, Tyler found herself in an NYC jail. With her one phone call she resourcefully called the New York Post. The headline the following day read, "Cops Grab 44 Men and a Real Girl in Slacks." Tyler was promptly released.

== National marches on Washington for lesbian and gay rights ==
Tyler produced and emceed the main stages for the first three historic lesbian and gay marches on Washington DC, and she called for the first National March on Washington for Lesbian and Gay Rights in 1979. While initially this first march was considered controversial even among LGBTQ communities, after the murder of Harvey Milk on November 27, 1978, LGBTQ people from across the country rose up in anger and protest, flooding Washington DC. The first march took place on Oct 14, 1979, and brought between 75,000 and 125,00 LGBT people to the Washington Monument grounds.

At the Second National March on Washington for Lesbian and Gay Rights, in 1987, Tyler, wearing a black tuxedo as she emceed the event, produced "The Wedding" on a special stage built on the Washington Mall. Over 6,000 people attended The Wedding where hundreds of gay couples took part in a mock marriage ceremony in protest of the fact that LGBT people were not allowed to legally marry. This was the first protest and act of mass civil disobedience in support of gay marriage in the United States.

== Activism ==
In 2004 Tyler and her late wife, Diane Olson, were the first couple to file a lawsuit against the state of California for the right to be married, launching a seven-year legal battle for marriage equality in the state. Ultimately it was their successful lawsuit that brought marriage equality to California. After winning their suit, Tyler and Olson became the first lesbian couple to be married in Los Angeles. The City Council of Los Angeles unanimously voted that their wedding day, June 16, 2008, should be known officially as “Marriage Equality Day."

In 2000, when radio host Dr. Laura Schlessinger called LGBTQ people "biological errors," among other slurs, Tyler became the National Protest Coordinator for StopDrLaura.com, spearheading a campaign against Schlessinger's homophobic propaganda. Protests were subsequently held across the country, including one produced by Tyler in front of Paramount Studios, the company slated to produce Schlessinger's new syndicated television talk show. Paramount Studios responded by promising that Dr. Schlessinger would no longer express anti-gay sentiments. To this Tyler quipped, "If (former Klan leader) David Duke were to do a cooking show and promised not to say anything about race, would any network still give him a show? We have a right to demand corporate responsibility to stop bigotry." Schelssinger's planned television show was subsequently canceled.

In 2003, as the US Supreme Court was hearing the case Lawrence v. Texas, Tyler co-organized national demonstrations across the United States. When the decision from the court came down affirming that sodomy laws were unconstitutional, thousands of LGBTQ rights activists rallied by Tyler came together in celebrations across the country.

== Comedy career ==
Tyler became the first out lesbian on U.S. national television on a 1978 Showtime comedy special hosted by Phyllis Diller. The 2024 Netflix documentary, Outstanding: A Comedy Revolution, documents the early history of LGBTQ standup comedy and features Tyler as one of the most influential progenitors of the genre. Tyler has said of the film,“I had tears in my eyes when I was watching the documentary for the first time. I remember being at the Troubadour and [people] yelling, ‘Get off the stage,’ ‘You’re a dyke.’ It's great not to be alone. And it's great that as we’ve evolved as a civil rights movement, our humor has evolved to not only protect us but to be used as a weapon.” The film also captures Tyler reflecting on what it meant to be an out feminist lesbian in the 1960's and the price still paid to be closeted: "Closets are vertical coffins," she declares in the film, "All you do is suffocate to death."

Tyler has released two comedy albums, "Always a Bridesmaid Never A Groom" in 1979, and "Just Kidding" in 1985. In her earlier career she was one half of the lesbian, feminist comedy duo, Harrison and Tyler. When Tyler and her partner Pat Harrison took on anti-gay crusader Anita Bryant as part of their television act, Tyler humorously remarked, “I don’t mind them being born again, but do they have to come back as themselves?” ABC promptly canceled their television deal.

== Lesbian music festivals ==
Along with the lesbian and gay marches on Washington, Tyler also produced a series of 25 popular women's music and comedy festivals, including the annual West Coast Women's Music and Comedy Festival, which ran from 1980 through 1994. Hers were the first trans-inclusive women's festivals in the country.

== Marriage ==
In 2004 Tyler and her late wife, Diane Olson, were the first couple to file a lawsuit against the state of California for the right to be married, launching a seven-year legal battle for marriage equality in the state. Ultimately it was their successful lawsuit that brought marriage equality to California. After winning their suit, Tyler and Olson became the first lesbian couple to be married in Los Angeles. They were married in June 2008, with rabbi Denise Eger officiating. The City Council of Los Angeles unanimously voted that their wedding day, June 16, 2008, should be known officially as “Marriage Equality Day."
