= Harrison and Tyler =

Duo of American feminist comedians

Pat Harrison (born 1935) and Robin Tyler (born April 8, 1942) were a feminist comedy duo, noted as the first lesbian, feminist comedy act. They came together during the 1970s, performing in small venues like colleges and using comedy as a tool to make fun of a system that oppresses lesbians, women, and members of the LGBT community. In 1970–1971 the comedy duo performed at Boston College where they met Maxine Feldman. Feldman joined Harrison and Tyler on their national tour, performing at colleges across the country and at a women's penitentiary, the California Institute for Women. Harrison and Tyler continued to tour college campuses throughout the U.S. for several years, bringing their particular brand of pointed, insightful, and decidedly gay, humor to students, while actively pushing for equal rights for women and LGBTQ people. In October of 1975 the comedy team was met with protestors when they performed at one of California State University, Long Beach's first Gay Pride celebrations. Tyler, in her persona as "Reverend Ripoff," delivered a scathing critique of rape culture, which was met by picketers carrying signs like, "Don't be a freak--be a normal Christian." This was the first national college tour of a lesbian comedy team.

They soon moved to even bigger opportunities with the American Broadcasting Company signing Harrison and Tyler to create a variety show. Unfortunately, they did not get picked up. The duo then began to make appearances on the Krofft Comedy Hour and at many feminist and gay rights demonstrations. During one demonstration, they asked for more athletic scholarships for women after running onto the field at a Raiders versus Rams football game. In 1972, Harrison and Tyler produced Maxine Feldman's "Angry Atthis" and began to produce their own comedy albums, Try It, You'll Like It (1972) and Wonder Women (1973). In a 2022 article about the early days of women in comedy, Tyler explained the humor she and Harrison deployed. "Humour is the most aggressive medium there is," she said, "The only way women were allowed to be aggressive is when they turned it on themselves. So you have Phyllis Diller and Joan Rivers with, 'I'm not pretty enough'" [...] "because that's what they had to do to make a living." Harrison and Tyler very effectively used this tactic to their advantage, as they were able to flip it around on their audience, revealing the misogyny which was embedded in much of the comedy scene at that time.

When in 1977 Tyler and Harrison took on anti-gay crusader Anita Bryant as part of their television act, Tyler humorously remarked, "I don't mind them being born again, but do they have to come back as themselves?" ABC promptly canceled their television deal.

Tyler and Harrison broke up as a comedy act, though not as a couple, in 1978. Robin Tyler went on to become the first out lesbian comic and a prominent leader in the movement for marriage equality and LGBTQIA+ rights.

== Works ==
- Try It, You'll Like It (1972)
- Wonder Women (1973).
